= 2020–21 NCDC season =

- League: United States Premier Hockey League; National Collegiate Development Conference
- Sport: Ice hockey
- Duration: Regular season September 22, 2020 – March 11, 2021; Postseason; March 13 – 28, 2021
- Games: 45–29
- Teams: 13

Regular season
- Season champions: Jersey Hitmen
- Top scorer: Liam McLinskey (Jersey Hitmen)

Dineen Cup Playoffs
- Finals champions: Jersey Hitmen
- Runners-up: Rockets Hockey Club

NCDC seasons
- ← 2019–20 2021–22 →

The 2020–21 NCDC season was the 4th season of the National Collegiate Development Conference (NCDC) Division of the United States Premier Hockey League (USPHL). The regular season ran from September 2020 to March 2021 with an unbalanced schedule. The Jersey Hitmen won the regular season championship and went on to defeated the Rockets Hockey Club 5 to 2 to capture the Dineen Cup.

== COVID precautions ==
Due to restriction levied at both the state and federal levels, the NCDC was forced to implement unique rules for this season. Games that were cancelled for any reason would not be made up. Because this could easily lead to an unbalanced schedule, the league also altered its playoff structure to allow all league members to participate. The particular regulations in Massachusetts for quarantining also forced the USPHL to have separate North Division quarterfinals; one for Bay State teams and another for the clubs located in Maine and New Hampshire.

== Member changes ==
- In November of 2019, the Boston Bandits sold the rights to their Tier II club to the Philadelphia Hockey Club. The team began play this season.
- In early 2020, the Rochester Monarchs were notified that their franchise would be removed from the NCDC due to poor on ice performance. After finishing the year with just 3 wins, the club dissolved and was soon followed by its Premier division affiliate.
- In June, the Boston Advantage were officially welcomed as members of the USPHL. While the flagship franchise would join the NCDC, the organization would also found several other clubs at the lower levels.

== Regular season ==
The standings at the end of the regular season were as follows:

Note: x = clinched playoff berth; y = clinched division title; z = clinched regular season title

=== Standings ===
==== North Division ====
Team	GP	W	L	OTL	SOL	Pts	GF	GA
xy – Boston Junior Bruins	42	30	9	2	1	63	160	99
x – South Shore Kings	39	22	16	1	0	45	116	123
x – New Hampshire Junior Monarchs	34	18	14	1	1	38	111	118
x – Islanders Hockey Club	43	16	23	4	0	36	127	169
x – Twin City Thunder	31	12	16	1	2	27	91	106
x – Boston Advantage	43	10	26	3	4	27	107	164
x – Northern Cyclones	29	11	16	1	1	24	74	109

==== South Division ====
Team	GP	W	L	OTL	SOL	Pts	GF	GA
xyz – New Jersey Hitmen	45	37	4	2	2	78	197	87
x – Rockets Hockey Club	44	35	5	4	0	74	176	80
x – P.A.L. Jr. Islanders	41	20	14	3	4	47	143	127
x – Connecticut Jr. Rangers	35	17	15	2	1	37	96	113
x – Utica Jr. Comets	36	13	20	3	0	29	104	140
x – Philadelphia Hockey Club	40	10	27	1	2	23	101	168

== Dineen Cup playoffs ==
Due to exigent circumstances, the three non-Massachusetts teams in the North Division played a Round-Robin series in the first round. The teams played each other once with the top two finishers advancing to the Division Semifinal.
In the semifinal round, teams were arranged so that the top northern qualifier played the second southern qualifier and vice versa.

Division Quarterfinals (Best-of-3, Round-Robin)
S3	P.A.L. Jr. Islanders	2
S6	Philadelphia Hockey Club	0
S4	Connecticut Jr. Rangers	2
S5	Utica Jr. Comets	0
N1	Boston Junior Bruins	2
N6	Boston Advantage	1
Massachusetts Quarterfinal
N2	South Shore Kings	1
N4	Islanders Hockey Club	2
N5	Twin City Thunder	2
N7	Northern Cyclones	1
N3	New Hampshire Junior Monarchs	0

Division Semifinals (Best-of-3)
S1	Jersey Hitmen	2
S4	Connecticut Jr. Rangers	0
South Division
S2	Rockets Hockey Club	2
S3	P.A.L. Jr. Islanders	0
N1	Boston Junior Bruins	2
N4	Islanders Hockey Club	0
North Division
N5	Twin City Thunder	2
N7	Northern Cyclones	1

Semifinals (Best-of-1)
S1	Jersey Hitmen	6
N5	Twin City Thunder	1
N1	Boston Junior Bruins	2
S2	Rockets Hockey Club	10

Championship (Best-of-1)
S1	Jersey Hitmen	5
S2	Rockets Hockey Club	2

Note: * denotes overtime period(s)

=== Division Quarterfinals ===
==== (S3) P.A.L. Jr. Islanders vs. (S6) Philadelphia Hockey Club ====
March 10	P.A.L. Jr. Islanders	6 – 3	Philadelphia Hockey Club	Ice Vault Arena

March 11	P.A.L. Jr. Islanders	4 – 3	Philadelphia Hockey Club	Ice Vault Arena

P.A.L. wins series 2 – 0

==== (S4) Connecticut Jr. Rangers vs. (S5) Utica Jr. Comets ====
March 11	Connecticut Jr. Rangers	4 – 3	OT	Utica Jr. Comets	Chelsea Piers Sky Rink
15:34 - Liam Connors (1)		First period		John Gutt (1) - 4:16; Charles Landshof (1) - 14:36
8:12 - Jason Marsella (1); 9:50 - Robert Barrasso (1)		Second period		No scoring
No scoring		Third period		Charles Landshof (2) - 13:43
11:52 - Liam Connors (2)		First overtime period		No scoring
Joe Sharib (28 saves / 31 shots)		Goalie stats		Cameron Whitehead (53 saves / 57 shots)

March 12	Connecticut Jr. Rangers	7 – 4	Utica Jr. Comets	Chelsea Piers Sky Rink
2:30 - Wyatt Pastor (1); 13:26 - pp - Reilly Connors (1); 16:23 - Reilly Connors (2)		First period	No scoring
12:28 - pp - Briggs Gammill (1); 13:08 - pp - Andrei Lyovushkin (1)		Second period	John Gutt (2) - 2:57
14:27 - pp - Andrei Lyovushkin (2); 15:08 - pp - Philip Quetell (1)		Third period	Nick Ahern (1) - 2:11; Walter Baumann (1) - pp - 16:39; Jesse Galassi (1) - pp - 19:05
Joe Sharib (37 saves / 41 shots)		Goalie stats	Cameron Whitehead (44 saves / 51 shots)

Connecticut wins series 2 – 0

==== (N1) Boston Junior Bruins vs. (N6) Boston Advantage ====
March 13	Boston Junior Bruins	4 – 5	Boston Advantage	New England Sports Center
7:39 - Collin Graf (1)		First period	Ryan Kuzmich (1) - pp - 4:04; Ryan Kuzmich (2) - 19:30
12:19 - Collin Graf (2); 15:58 - Bradey Farrell (1)		Second period	Trevor Smith (1) - 8:10; Trevor Smith (2) - pp - 12:06; Jonny Hammel (2) - 13:33
9:40 - Ian Carpentier (1)		Third period	No scoring
T.J. Semptimphelter (36 saves / 41 shots)		Goalie stats	Connor Bradford (44 saves / 48 shots)

March 14	Boston Junior Bruins	8 – 2	Boston Advantage	New England Sports Center
6:08 - Shane Lachance (1)		First period	No scoring
5:06 - pp - Domenic Garozzo (1); 8:25 - Jude Brower (1); 15:50 - Jack Pascucci (1); 16:17 - pp - Domenic Garozzo (2)		Second period	No scoring
2:44 - Frank Ireland (1); 7:27 - pp - Domenic Garozzo (3); 13:05 - sh - Chris Delaney (1)		Third period	George Krotiris (1) - 12:46; Danny Magnuson (1) - pp - 17:47
T.J. Semptimphelter (27 saves / 29 shots)		Goalie stats	Connor Bradford (26 saves / 31 shots); Nick Bevilacqua (11 saves / 14 shots)

March 15	Boston Junior Bruins	4 – 0	Boston Advantage	New England Sports Center
Frank Ireland (2) - 0:48; Foster White (1) - 9:02		First period	No scoring
No scoring		Second period	No scoring
Ian Carpentier (2) - pp - 7:53; Joe Solimine (1) - 8:27		Third period	No scoring
T.J. Semptimphelter (32 saves / 32 shots)		Goalie stats	Connor Bradford (35 saves / 39 shots)

Junior Bruins win series 2 – 1

==== (N2) South Shore Kings vs. (N4) Islanders Hockey Club ====
March 12	South Shore Kings	1 – 2	Islanders Hockey Club	Foxboro Sports Center
No scoring		First period	No scoring
No scoring		Second period	Cy LeClerc (1) - 18:09
18:12 - Jack Luca (1)		Third period	Tyler Young (1) - 19:10
Evan Szary (38 saves / 40 shots)		Goalie stats	Brandon Milberg (15 saves / 15 shots); Ford DeLoss (8 saves / 9 shots)

March 15	South Shore Kings	3 – 5	Islanders Hockey Club	Foxboro Sports Center

Islanders win series 2 – 0

==== Round Robin ====
February 9	New Hampshire Junior Monarchs	0 – 2	Northern Cyclones	AdventHealth Center Ice

February 12	Twin City Thunder	3 – 1	Northern Cyclones	AdventHealth Center Ice

February 17	New Hampshire Junior Monarchs	2 – 3	Twin City Thunder	AdventHealth Center Ice

February 18	Twin City Thunder	5 – 2	Northern Cyclones	AdventHealth Center Ice

February 19	New Hampshire Junior Monarchs	3 – 4	OT	Twin City Thunder	AdventHealth Center Ice

=== Division Semifinals ===
==== (S1) Jersey Hitmen vs. (S4) Connecticut Jr. Rangers ====
March 19	Jersey Hitmen	6 – 3	Connecticut Jr. Rangers	Ice Vault Arena
12:10 - pp - Sean Melso (1); 15:45 - pp - Dylan Lugris (1)		First period	Mika Petersen (1) - pp - 18:22
8:10 - Sean Melso (2)		Second period	Jake Lanyi (1) - pp - 10:27; Andrei Lyovushkin (3) - pp - 19:47
3:40 - Patrick Keegan (1); 18:53 - Daniel Sambuco (1); 19:02 - Jin Lee (1)		Third period	No scoring
Damon Beaver (33 saves / 36 shots)		Goalie stats	Joe Sharib (26 saves / 30 shots); Derek Manzella (0 saves / 2 shots)

March 20	Jersey Hitmen	3 – 2	Connecticut Jr. Rangers	Ice Vault Arena
6:18 - Alex Mozian (1)		First period	No scoring
8:38 - pp - Jin Lee (2)		Second period	Philip Quetell (2) - 17:51
14:03 - Steven Townley (1)		Third period	Andrei Lyovushkin (4) - 2:09
Chase Clark (42 saves / 44 shots)		Goalie stats	Joe Sharib (32 saves / 35 shots)

Jersey wins series 2 – 0

==== (S2) Rockets Hockey Club vs. (S3) P.A.L. Jr. Islanders ====
March 19	Rockets Hockey Club	3 – 2	P.A.L. Jr. Islanders	Bridgewater Sports Arena
5:21 - Jake Bongo (1); 7:24 - Cole Vallese (1)		First period	No scoring
17:06 - pp - Connor Tait (1)		Second period	Domenic Settimo (1) - 10:54
No scoring		Third period	Holden Hertog (1) - 6:16
Matthew O'Donnell (28 saves / 30 shots)		Goalie stats	Thomas Gale (21 saves / 24 shots)

March 20	Rockets Hockey Club	2 – 0	P.A.L. Jr. Islanders	Bridgewater Sports Arena
1:16 - Clark Kerner (1); 2:59 - Michael Fairfax (1)		First period	No scoring
No scoring		Second period	No scoring
No scoring		Third period	No scoring
Matthew O'Donnell (19 saves / 19 shots)		Goalie stats	Thomas Gale (30 saves / 32 shots)

Rockets win series 2 – 0

==== (N1) Boston Junior Bruins vs. (N4) Islanders Hockey Club ====
March 20	Boston Junior Bruins	4 – 3	OT	Islanders Hockey Club	New England Sports Center

March 21	Boston Junior Bruins	6 – 2	Islanders Hockey Club	New England Sports Center

Junior Bruins win series 2 – 0
