= 2021–22 NCDC season =

- League: United States Premier Hockey League; National Collegiate Development Conference
- Sport: Ice hockey
- Duration: Regular season September 2021 – March 2022; Postseason; March 17 – April 2, 2022
- Games: 49–48
- Teams: 13

Regular season
- Season champions: Jersey Hitmen
- Top scorer: Patriks Marcinkevics (Jersey Hitmen)

Dineen Cup Playoffs
- Finals champions: Jersey Hitmen
- Runners-up: Boston Junior Bruins

NCDC seasons
- ← 2020–21 2022–23 →

The 2021–22 NCDC season was the 5th season of the National Collegiate Development Conference (NCDC) Division of the United States Premier Hockey League (USPHL). The regular season ran from September 2021 to March 2022 with a slightly unbalanced schedule. The Jersey Hitmen won the regular season championship and went on to defeated the Boston Junior Bruins 2 games to 0 to capture the Dineen Cup.

== Member changes ==
None

== Regular season ==
The standings at the end of the regular season were as follows:

Note: x = clinched playoff berth; y = clinched division title; z = clinched regular season title

=== Standings ===
==== North Division ====
Team	GP	W	L	OTL	SOL	Pts	GF	GA
xy – New Hampshire Junior Monarchs	48	29	14	3	2	63	142	132
x – Boston Junior Bruins	48	28	15	3	2	61	159	138
x – Twin City Thunder	48	24	18	2	4	54	151	139
x – South Shore Kings	48	25	19	2	2	54	173	162
Northern Cyclones	48	22	22	1	3	48	146	154
Boston Advantage	48	21	23	3	1	46	140	180
Islanders Hockey Club	48	14	31	1	2	31	133	186

==== South Division ====
Team	GP	W	L	OTL	SOL	Pts	GF	GA
xyz – Jersey Hitmen	49	35	11	2	1	73	234	131
x – Rockets Hockey Club	49	29	14	3	3	64	185	156
x – Philadelphia Hockey Club	49	23	18	7	1	54	147	161
x – P.A.L. Jr. Islanders	49	25	21	2	1	53	135	142
Utica Jr. Comets	49	21	24	4	0	46	155	187
Connecticut Jr. Rangers	49	19	24	4	2	44	152	184

=== Statistics ===
==== Scoring leaders ====
The following players led the league in regular season points at the completion of all regular season games.

Player	Team	GP	G	A	Pts	PIM
Patriks Marcinkevics	Jersey Hitmen	49	34	62	96	55
Johnny Wescoe	Rockets Hockey Club	49	25	47	72	8
Dominiks Marcinkevics	Jersey Hitmen	34	31	40	71	26
Barron Woodring	Rockets Hockey Club	46	27	31	58	28
Joe Solimine	Boston Junior Bruins	48	19	39	58	22
Alexander Dameski	Jersey Hitmen	46	32	25	57	43
Spencer Korona	P.A.L. Jr. Islanders	49	11	45	56	18
Evan Brown	Rockets Hockey Club	43	20	35	55	18
John Gutt	Utica Jr. Comets	49	18	36	54	32
Tanner Hartman	New Hampshire Junior Monarchs	47	23	30	53	26
Chikara Hanzawa	South Shore Kings	47	17	36	53	29

== Dineen Cup playoffs ==
Division Semifinals (Best-of-3)
N1	New Hampshire Junior Monarchs	2*	2	-
N4	South Shore Kings	1	0	-
North Division
N2	Boston Junior Bruins	2	5	2*
N3	Twin City Thunder	3*	2	1
S1	Jersey Hitmen	5	10	-
S4	P.A.L. Jr. Islanders	3	4	-
South Division
S2	Rockets Hockey Club	3	4	-
S3	Philadelphia Hockey Club	0	3	-

Division Finals (Best-of-3)
N1	New Hampshire Junior Monarchs	5	3	1
N2	Boston Junior Bruins	4	4*	5
S1	Jersey Hitmen	2	2	5
S2	Rockets Hockey Club	1	4	1

Championship (Best-of-3)
N2	Boston Junior Bruins	2	1	-
S1	Jersey Hitmen	4	4	-

Note: * denotes overtime period(s)
