= 2022–23 NCDC season =

- League: United States Premier Hockey League; National Collegiate Development Conference
- Sport: Ice hockey
- Duration: Regular season September 2022 – March 2023; Postseason; March 15 – April 2, 2023
- Games: 50
- Teams: 14

Regular season
- Season champions: Jersey Hitmen
- Top scorer: Caden Cranston (Rockets Hockey Club)

Dineen Cup Playoffs
- Finals champions: P.A.L. Jr. Islanders
- Runners-up: South Shore Kings

NCDC seasons
- ← 2021–22 2023–24 →

The 2022–23 NCDC season was the 6th season of the National Collegiate Development Conference (NCDC) Division of the United States Premier Hockey League (USPHL). The regular season ran from September 2022 to March 2023 with a 50-game schedule for each team. The Jersey Hitmen won the regular season championship. The P.A.L. Jr. Islanders defeated the South Shore Kings 2 games to 1 to capture the Dineen Cup.

== Member changes ==
- On February 3, 2022, the USPHL announced that the Wilkes-Barre/Scranton Knights would be promoted to the NCDC from the Premier Division (Tier III) for this season.
- A little over a month later, the Mercer Chiefs were added as an expansion franchise for this season.
- At the end of March, the USPHL announced that the Philadelphia Hockey Club would not continue as members of the league after the end of the '22 season. The club would subsequently join the Eastern Hockey League.

== Regular season ==
The standings at the end of the regular season were as follows:

Note: x = clinched playoff berth; y = clinched division title; z = clinched regular season title

=== Standings ===
==== North Division ====
Team	GP	W	L	OTL	SOL	Pts	GF	GA
xy – Northern Cyclones	50	29	17	2	6	62	168	157
x – South Shore Kings	50	28	17	4	1	61	159	142
x – Boston Advantage	50	27	17	5	1	60	152	167
x – New Hampshire Junior Monarchs	50	25	17	2	6	58	140	139
x – Twin City Thunder	50	25	21	2	2	54	146	143
Boston Junior Bruins	50	19	25	3	3	44	151	169
Islanders Hockey Club	50	17	29	1	3	38	134	176

==== South Division ====
Team	GP	W	L	OTL	SOL	Pts	GF	GA
xyz – Jersey Hitmen	50	36	12	1	1	74	201	117
x – P.A.L. Jr. Islanders	50	34	11	1	4	73	192	132
x – Rockets Hockey Club	50	26	19	3	2	57	196	187
x – Mercer Chiefs	50	26	20	1	3	56	147	157
Connecticut Jr. Rangers	50	23	19	5	3	54	153	154
Utica Jr. Comets	50	18	28	3	1	40	157	204
Wilkes-Barre/Scranton Knights	50	17	28	2	3	39	138	190

=== Statistics ===
==== Scoring leaders ====
The following players led the league in regular season points at the completion of all regular season games.

Player	Team	GP	G	A	Pts	PIM
Caden Cranston	Rockets Hockey Club	50	18	58	76	12
Luca Leighton	P.A.L. Jr. Islanders	45	22	41	63	46
Cade Baker	Rockets Hockey Club	50	25	37	62	12
Luke Panchisin	Boston Advantage	49	26	35	61	87
Tyler McNeil	Jersey Hitmen	50	25	34	59	34
Cam Bergeman	Rockets Hockey Club	50	25	33	58	16
Barron Woodring	Rockets Hockey Club	45	31	26	57	24
Easton Ryan	Boston Junior Bruins	50	22	35	57	30
Michael Herrera	Utica Jr. Comets	49	31	21	52	71
Marko Giourof	Northern Cyclones	48	21	31	52	39
Michael DiPietra	Jersey Hitmen	50	17	35	52	22

== Dineen Cup playoffs ==
Division Qualifier (Best-of-1)	Division Semifinals (Best-of-3)
N1	Northern Cyclones	3*	1	3
N5	Twin City Thunder	2	3	4*
N3	Boston Advantage	4
N5	Twin City Thunder	5*
North Division
N2	South Shore Kings	6	3	5
N4	New Hampshire Junior Monarchs	0	4*	1
S1	Jersey Hitmen	2	2	-
S4	Mercer Chiefs	3	3	-
South Division
S2	P.A.L. Jr. Islanders	8	2	-
S3	Rockets Hockey Club	4	1	-

Division Finals (Best-of-3)
N5	Twin City Thunder	1	4	-
N2	South Shore Kings	4	5*	-
S4	Mercer Chiefs	1	2	-
S2	P.A.L. Jr. Islanders	2*	3*	-

Championship (Best-of-3)
N2	South Shore Kings	3	1	2
S2	P.A.L. Jr. Islanders	1	2*	6

Note: * denotes overtime period(s)
