= 2019–20 NCDC season =

- League: United States Premier Hockey League; National Collegiate Development Conference
- Sport: Ice hockey
- Duration: Regular season September 2019 – March 2020; Postseason; Cancelled
- Games: 50
- Teams: 13

Regular season
- Season champions: New Jersey Hitmen

Dineen Cup Playoffs

NCDC seasons
- ← 2018–19 2020–21 →

The 2019–20 NCDC season was the 3rd season of the National Collegiate Development Conference (NCDC) Division of the United States Premier Hockey League (USPHL). The regular season ran from September 2019 to March 2020 with a 50-game schedule. Due to the COVID-19 pandemic, the entire postseason was cancelled before any games were played.

== Member changes ==
- In January 2019, the USPHL announced the approval of a franchise for Lewiston, Maine that was later named Twin City Thunder. The team began play this season.
- In March, the league announced the merger of the Syracuse Stars and the Utica Jr. Comets. The Stars assumed Jr. Comets name and colors.

== Regular season ==
The standings at the end of the regular season were as follows:

Note: x = clinched playoff berth; y = clinched regular season title

=== Standings ===
| Team | GP | W | L | OTL | SOL | Pts | GF | GA |
|---|---|---|---|---|---|---|---|---|
| xy – New Jersey Hitmen | 50 | 42 | 5 | 1 | 2 | 87 | 226 | 114 |
| x – Boston Junior Bruins | 50 | 39 | 8 | 1 | 2 | 81 | 208 | 129 |
| x – Connecticut Jr. Rangers | 50 | 27 | 14 | 8 | 1 | 63 | 168 | 141 |
| x – Islanders Hockey Club | 50 | 29 | 17 | 3 | 1 | 62 | 187 | 144 |
| x – P.A.L. Jr. Islanders | 50 | 28 | 16 | 3 | 3 | 62 | 160 | 146 |
| x – Northern Cyclones | 50 | 28 | 16 | 5 | 1 | 62 | 187 | 176 |
| x – Boston Bandits | 50 | 25 | 17 | 4 | 4 | 58 | 196 | 182 |
| x – New Hampshire Junior Monarchs | 50 | 24 | 20 | 2 | 4 | 54 | 154 | 144 |
| Twin City Thunder | 50 | 26 | 22 | 2 | 0 | 54 | 170 | 164 |
| Utica Jr. Comets | 50 | 22 | 24 | 4 | 0 | 48 | 161 | 177 |
| South Shore Kings | 50 | 17 | 27 | 3 | 3 | 40 | 145 | 191 |
| Rockets Hockey Club | 50 | 15 | 28 | 6 | 1 | 37 | 160 | 204 |
| Rochester Monarchs | 50 | 3 | 44 | 3 | 0 | 9 | 78 | 288 |

== Dineen Cup playoffs ==
At the conclusion of the regular season, the playoff matches were set. However, prior to the start of the postseason, the remainder of the season was cancelled due to the COVID-19 pandemic.

Quarterfinals (Best-of-3)
1 | New Jersey Hitmen
8 | New Hampshire Junior Monarchs
2 | Boston Junior Bruins
7 | Boston Bandits
3 | Connecticut Jr. Rangers
6 | Northern Cyclones
4 | Islanders Hockey Club
5 | P.A.L. Jr. Islanders

Semifinals (Best-of-3)

Championship (Best-of-3)

Note: * denotes overtime period(s)
