= 2017–18 NCDC season =

- League: United States Premier Hockey League; National Collegiate Development Conference
- Sport: Ice hockey
- Duration: Regular season September 2017 – March 2018; Postseason; March 2018
- Games: 50
- Teams: 11

Regular season
- Season champions: Islanders Hockey Club

Dineen Cup Playoffs
- Finals champions: Islanders Hockey Club
- Runners-up: New Jersey Hitmen

NCDC seasons
- 2018–19 →

The 2017–18 NCDC season was the inaugural season of the National Collegiate Development Conference (NCDC) Division of the United States Premier Hockey League (USPHL). The regular season ran from September 2018 to March 2019 with a 50-game schedule. The Islanders Hockey Club won the regular season championship and went on to defeated the New Jersey Hitmen 2 games to 1 to capture the Dineen Cup.

== Foundation ==
In October of 2016, the USPHL announced that they had applied to USA Hockey for approval to add a Tier II junior league beginning with the 2017–18 season. Two months later, the petition was denied. Instead of ending their plans, the USPHL withdrew from USA Hockey oversight and organized the National Collegiate Development Conference. Once the league was formally established, the USPHL allowed any of their franchises to join the Tier II level or establish separate franchises and play in multiple divisions. The Connecticut Jr. Rangers, Islanders Hockey Club, New Jersey Hitmen, South Shore Kings and Syracuse Stars each founded new Tier II clubs. The Boston Junior Bruins and P.A.L. Jr. Islanders both promoted their Premier Division clubs to the NCDC. The Rochester Monarchs also joined from the Elite Division.

In addition to the internal changes, the USPHL also added the Boston Bandits, New Jersey Rockets and Northern Cyclones from the Eastern Hockey League.

== Regular season ==
The standings at the end of the regular season were as follows:

Note: x = clinched playoff berth; y = clinched regular season title

=== Standings ===
Team	GP	W	L	OTL	Pts	GF	GA
xy – Islanders Hockey Club	50	47	3	0	94	254	107
x – Boston Junior Bruins	50	36	11	3	75	186	129
x – New Jersey Hitmen	50	34	15	1	69	207	127
x – South Shore Kings	50	29	16	5	63	175	165
x – Connecticut Jr. Rangers	50	27	20	3	57	174	155
x – Northern Cyclones	50	24	21	5	53	165	162
x – Syracuse Stars	50	19	22	9	47	150	199
x – Boston Bandits	50	20	26	4	44	154	175
P.A.L. Jr. Islanders	50	19	27	4	42	142	170
Rochester Monarchs	50	14	30	6	34	109	169
New Jersey Rockets	50	6	42	2	14	96	253

== Dineen Cup playoffs ==
At the conclusion of the regular season, the playoff matches were set. However, prior to the start of the postseason, the remainder of the season was cancelled due to the COVID-19 pandemic.

Quarterfinals (Best-of-3)
1	Islanders Hockey Club	2
8	Boston Bandits	0
2	Boston Junior Bruins	2
7	Syracuse Stars	1
3	New Jersey Hitmen	2
6	Northern Cyclones	1
4	South Shore Kings	1
5	Connecticut Jr. Rangers	2

Semifinals (Best-of-3)
1	Islanders Hockey Club	2
5	Connecticut Jr. Rangers	0
2	Boston Junior Bruins	1
3	New Jersey Hitmen	2

Championship (Best-of-3)
1	Islanders Hockey Club	2
3	New Jersey Hitmen	1

Note: * denotes overtime period(s)
