= 2018–19 NCDC season =

- League: United States Premier Hockey League; National Collegiate Development Conference
- Sport: Ice hockey
- Duration: Regular season September 2018 – March 2019; Postseason; March 2019
- Games: 50
- Teams: 10

Regular season
- Season champions: New Jersey Hitmen

Dineen Cup Playoffs
- Finals champions: Boston Junior Bruins
- Runners-up: Connecticut Jr. Rangers

NCDC seasons
- ← 2017–18 2019–20 →

The 2018–19 NCDC season was the 2nd season of the National Collegiate Development Conference (NCDC) Division of the United States Premier Hockey League (USPHL). The regular season ran from September 2018 to March 2019 with a 50-game schedule. The New Jersey Hitmen won the regular season championship. The Boston Junior Bruins defeated the Connecticut Jr. Rangers 2 games to 1 to capture the Dineen Cup.

== Member changes ==
- In On November 2, 2017, the USPHL announced that the New Hampshire Junior Monarchs would found a Tier II franchise that would begin playing in the NCDC this season.

== Regular season ==
The standings at the end of the regular season were as follows:

Note: x = clinched playoff berth; y = clinched regular season title

=== Standings ===
Team	GP	W	L	OTL	SOL	Pts	GF	GA
xy – New Jersey Hitmen	50	43	7	0	0	86	218	103
x – Boston Junior Bruins	50	32	15	2	1	67	200	139
x – Connecticut Jr. Rangers	50	30	17	1	2	63	178	148
x – Islanders Hockey Club	50	27	18	2	3	59	157	147
x – New Hampshire Junior Monarchs	50	27	18	4	1	59	176	152
x – Syracuse Stars	50	27	19	3	1	58	173	165
x – Boston Bandits	50	26	18	2	4	58	153	149
x – Northern Cyclones	50	26	20	3	1	56	155	160
New Jersey Rockets	50	19	24	5	2	45	149	189
P.A.L. Jr. Islanders	50	14	31	4	1	33	156	197
Rochester Monarchs	50	15	33	1	1	32	146	211
South Shore Kings	50	14	34	1	1	30	120	221

== Dineen Cup playoffs ==
At the conclusion of the regular season, the playoff matches were set. However, prior to the start of the postseason, the remainder of the season was cancelled due to the COVID-19 pandemic.

Quarterfinals (Best-of-3)
1	New Jersey Hitmen	0
8	Northern Cyclones	2
2	Boston Junior Bruins	2
7	Boston Bandits	0
3	Connecticut Jr. Rangers	2
6	Syracuse Stars	0
4	Islanders Hockey Club	2
5	New Hampshire Junior Monarchs	0

Semifinals (Best-of-3)
2	Boston Junior Bruins	2
8	Northern Cyclones	0
3	Connecticut Jr. Rangers	2
4	Islanders Hockey Club	0

Championship (Best-of-3)
2	Boston Junior Bruins	2
3	Connecticut Jr. Rangers	1

Note: * denotes overtime period(s)
