= Springfield Pics =

- City: West Springfield, Massachusetts
- League: USPHL
- Founded: 1993
- Home arena: Olympia Ice Center
- Colors: Blue, red, white
- General manager: Robert Bonneau
- Head coach: Robert Bonneau
- Website: www.springfieldjrpics.com

Franchise history
- 1993–1995: Springfield Olympics
- 1995–1997: New England Jr. Whalers
- 1997–2004: New England Jr. Coyotes
- 2004–2009: New England Jr. Falcons
- 2009–present: Springfield Pics

The Springfield Pics are an American junior ice hockey organization playing in West Springfield, Massachusetts at the Olympia Ice Center. They field two Tier III teams and a number of Youth teams.

== History ==
The franchise was founded as the Springfield Olympics (or Pics for short) as charter member of the Tier III Junior A Eastern Junior Hockey League (EJHL) in 1993. The team relocated across the Massachusetts-Connecticut border to Enfield, Connecticut in 1995 and were renamed the New England Jr. Whalers, after the local National Hockey League team in Hartford. After the Hartford Whalers moved to Carolina in 1997, the franchise was renamed the New England Jr. Coyotes and later the Jr. Falcons after the local Springfield Falcons of the American Hockey League. During this time, the organization also fielded a team in the Tier III Empire Junior B Hockey League (EmJHL) (later the Empire Junior Hockey League).

In the 2009 off-season, the Jr. Falcons EJHL and EmJHL teams merged with the Springfield Pics of the Continental Hockey Association (CHA) and the Bay State Bucs Midget team, members of the NEMHL. This led the now merged Pics organization to field teams in the EJHL, EmJHL, and CHA.

== USPHL Premier Division ==
In 2013, many Tier III junior hockey leagues were re-organized in the northeastern United States and the Springfield Pics became founding members of the new United States Premier Hockey League (USPHL). Their former Junior A team (USA Hockey dropped Junior A and B designations in 2011) which had participated in the EJHL joined the USPHL Elite Division for the 2013–14 season. In their first year in the USPHL-Elite League the Pics finished second and then went on to win the playoffs. The playoff win propelled the team to the 2014 USA Hockey Tier III Junior Nationals where they won their pool before losing the semifinal game to the eventual National Champions, the Boston Jr. Bruins. The Elite Division team was promoted to the Premier Division prior to the 2014–15 season.

== USHPL USP3 Division ==
Their former Junior B team from the EmJHL joined the USPHL Empire Division for the 2013–14 season. In 2015, the Empire Division became the USP3 Division.

== Former Junior B ESHL team ==
Their second Junior B team last competed in the Eastern States Hockey League (formerly the CHA). Following the 2013 re-organization, this team was eliminated in favor of Under 18 and Under 16 teams which play in corresponding USPHL leagues.

== Season-by-season records ==
Season	GP	W	L	T	OTL	Pts	GF	GA	Regular season finish	Playoffs
New England Jr. Falcons
2004–05	50	18	23	7	2	45	160	159	5th of 7, South; 10th of 13, EJHL	Won Play-in game, 3–0 vs. Green Mountain Glades; Lost Quarterfinals, 0–1–1 vs. Boston Jr. Bruins
2005–06	45	22	16	5	2	51	175	175	1st of 7, South; T-4th of 14, EJHL	Won Quarterfinals, 2–0 vs. Valley Jr. Warriors; Lost Semifinal game, 1–3 vs. Boston Jr. Bruins
2006–07	45	16	22	4	3	39	145	180	5th of 7, South; 11th of 14, EJHL	Did not qualify
2007–08	44	12	24	5	3	32	125	173	7th of 7, South; 12th of 14, EJHL	Did not qualify
2008–09	45	16	22	3	4	39	128	149	5th of 7, South; 10th of 14, EJHL	Did not qualify
Springfield Pics
2009–10	45	16	23	4	2	38	150	179	5th of 7, South; 10th of 14, EJHL	Did not qualify
2010–11	45	25	16	2	2	54	182	156	4th of 7, South; 6th of 14, EJHL	Won First Round, 2–0 vs. Rochester Stars; Lost Quarterfinals, 1–2 vs. Boston Jr. Bruins
2011–12	45	20	23	0	2	42	166	175	5th of 7, South; 10th of 14, EJHL	Lost First Round, 0–2 vs. Green Mountain Glades
2012–13	45	24	17	—	4	52	137	118	4th of 7, South; 8th of 14, EJHL	Lost First Round, 0–2 vs. New Hampshire Jr. Monarchs
2013–14	40	32	6	—	2	66	212	92	2nd of 10, North; 2nd of 18, USPHL Elite	Won First Round, 2–0 vs. New Hampshire Jr. Monarchs-Elite; Won Quarterfinals, 2–0 vs. Bay State Breakers-Elite; 2–0–1 in Round Robin (W, 5–0 vs. Hampton Roads Whalers; T, 4–4 vs. Jersey Hitmen; W, 5–0 vs. Florida Eels); Won Championship game, 3–2 vs. Jersey Hitmen-Elite; Elite Division Champions
2014–15	50	9	37	—	4	22	105	239	11th of 11, USPHL Premier	Did not qualify
2015–16	44	11	30	—	3	25	123	187	11th of 12, USPHL Premier	Did not qualify
2016–17	45	19	22	—	4	42	138	174	7th of 10, USPHL Premier	Won Play-in Game, 4–0 vs. Okanagan Eagles; Won Quarterfinals, 2–0 vs. Jersey Hitmen; Lost Semifinals, 0–2 vs. Islanders Hockey Club
2017–18	44	25	18	—	1	51	149	144	7th of 9, North Div. 20th of 44, Premier	Lost First Round, 1–2 vs. Islanders Hockey Club-Premier
2018–19	44	24	17	—	3	51	139	105	2nd of 7, North East Div. 25th of 52, Premier	First Round bye Lost Nationals qualifiers, 0–2 vs. Syracuse Stars-Premier
2019–20	44	29	14	—	1	59	167	108	2nd of 6, North East Div. 17th of 52, Premier	First Round bye Won Nationals qualifiers, 2–0 vs. Connecticut Jr. Rangers-Premier; 0–1–0 USPHL-Premier Nationals round-robin Pool B (L, 1–5 vs. Vengeance; vs. Rush; vs. Havoc); Tournament cancelled due to COVID-19 pandemic
2020–21	44	23	18	—	3	49	130	127	4th of 9, New England Div. 31st of 62, Premier	Lost First Round series, 1–2 vs. Bridgewater Bandits
2021–22	44	25	17	—	2	52	135	125	5th of 9, New England Div. 28th of 64, Premier	Lost First Round series, 1–2 vs. Boston Jr. Bruins
2022–23	44	23	19	—	2	48	144	150	5th of 9, New England Div. 36th of 69, Premier	Lost First Round series, 0–2 vs. Bridgewater Bandits
2023–24	44	21	21	—	2	44	149	156	5th of 7, New England Div. 36th of 61, Premier	Lost Div. Quarterfinals, 0–2 vs. Gatineau Universel
2024–25	44	32	8	2	0	68	205	110	2nd of 9, New England Div. 11th of 71, Premier	Won Div. Quarterfinals, 2-0 vs. Junior Bruins; Won Div Semifinals 2-0 Northern Cyclones; Won Div Finals 2-0 Islanders HC; Divisional Round Robin 2-1 (W Squatch 9-4)(L Fresno 2-4)(W Metro 6-0); 2nd of 6 - Pool 1 Lost National Semifinal 2-6 Vernal Oilers
2025–26	54	18	32	2	2	40	165	246	6 of 6, New England; 26th of 33, NCDC	Did Not Qualify

== USA Hockey Tier III National Championships ==
Round robin play in pool with top 4 teams advancing to semifinal.

Year	Round Robin	Record	Standing	Semifinal	Championship Game
2014	L, Northern Cyclones (EHL) 3-4; W, Flint Jr. Generals (NA3HL) 6-0; W, Bellingham Blazers (NPHL) 8-2	2-0-1	1st of 4 Pool B (White)	L, Boston Jr. Bruins (USPHL-Premier) 6-0	—
