= Hunter McDonald =

American ice hockey player (born 2002)

- Born: May 11, 2002 (age 24) Fairport, New York, U.S.
- Height: 6 ft 4 in (193 cm)
- Weight: 205 lb (93 kg; 14 st 9 lb)
- Position: Defense
- Shoots: Left
- NHL team: Philadelphia Flyers
- NHL draft: 165th overall, 2022; Philadelphia Flyers
- Playing career: 2024–present

Hunter McDonald (born May 11, 2002) is an American professional ice hockey defenseman for the Philadelphia Flyers of the National Hockey League (NHL). He was drafted 165th overall in the 2022 NHL entry draft by the Flyers.

== Career statistics ==
			Regular season					Playoffs
Season	Team	League	GP	G	A	Pts	PIM	GP	G	A	Pts	PIM
2018–19	Fairport High School	NYSPHSAA	17	12	12	24	45	3	1	1	2	4
2019–20	Rochester Monarchs	NCDC	21	2	2	4	65	—	—	—	—	—
2019–20	Corpus Christi IceRays	NAHL	7	1	1	2	10	—	—	—	—	—
2020–21	Omaha Lancers	USHL	36	2	3	5	96	2	0	0	0	2
2021–22	Omaha Lancers	USHL	33	3	7	10	59	—	—	—	—	—
2021–22	Chicago Steel	USHL	21	1	3	4	28	3	0	0	0	4
2022–23	Northeastern University	HE	35	1	13	14	56	—	—	—	—	—
2023–24	Northeastern University	HE	23	1	5	6	32	—	—	—	—	—
2023–24	Lehigh Valley Phantoms	AHL	11	0	3	3	12	6	1	0	1	22
2024–25	Lehigh Valley Phantoms	AHL	71	4	14	18	99	7	1	0	1	12
2025–26	Lehigh Valley Phantoms	AHL	65	0	6	6	92	—	—	—	—	—
2025–26	Philadelphia Flyers	NHL	1	0	1	1	4	—	—	—	—	—
NHL totals			1	0	1	1	4	—	—	—	—	—
