= Sam Colangelo =

American ice hockey player (born 2001)

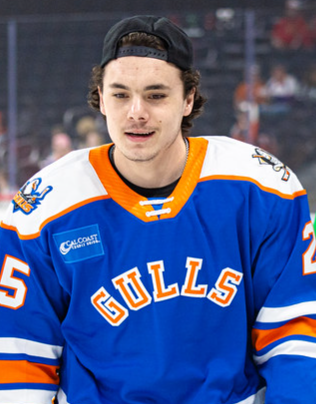
- Colangelo in 2025
- Born: December 26, 2001 (age 24) Stoneham, Massachusetts, U.S.
- Height: 6 ft 2 in (188 cm)
- Weight: 213 lb (97 kg; 15 st 3 lb)
- Position: Right wing
- Shoots: Right
- NHL team: Anaheim Ducks
- NHL draft: 36th overall, 2020; Anaheim Ducks
- Playing career: 2024–present

Samuel Michael Colangelo (born December 26, 2001) is an American professional ice hockey forward for the Anaheim Ducks in the National Hockey League (NHL). He was selected by the Ducks in the second round, 36th overall, of the 2020 NHL entry draft.

== Playing career ==
=== Early life and high school ===
Colangelo was born on December 26, 2001, in Stoneham, Massachusetts. He has an older brother named Michael. In high school, he attended Lawrence Academy, where he played on the ice hockey team and scored 34 goals with 70 assists.

=== Amateur ===
Colangelo played two seasons with the Chicago Steel in the United States Hockey League (USHL). In his first season, he scored just three goals. But in his second season he scored 28 goals with 30 assists, playing alongside Brendan Brisson. Colangelo opted for the National Hockey League (NHL) draft. He was drafted by the Anaheim Ducks in the second round, 36th overall, of the 2020 NHL entry draft.

Colangelo was recruited by Northeastern University, which is situated just 10 miles (16 km) from his home in Stoneham. He played three seasons of collegiate hockey with the Huskies before entering the transfer portal after his Junior season. Moving to the Western Michigan Broncos for the 2023–24 season, Colangelo broke out offensively, scoring a career-high 24 goals while also setting single-season bests with 19 assists and 43 points in 38 appearances. Colangelo was named to the All-NCHC Team with Western Michigan along with teammate Luke Grainger.

=== Professional ===
Having concluded his senior year with the Broncos, Colangelo was originally signed to a professional try-out contract the Ducks AHL affiliate, the San Diego Gulls, on April 2, 2024. He made his professional debut with the Gulls and after four successful regular season games he was signed to a two-year, entry-level with the Anaheim Ducks on April 12, 2024. Colangelo immediately joined the Ducks roster to conclude the 2023–24 season and scored his first goal on goaltender Dustin Wolf in his NHL debut in a 6–3 defeat to the Calgary Flames on April 13, 2024.

Colangelo was assigned to Anaheim's American Hockey League (AHL) affiliate, the San Diego Gulls, to start the 2024–25 season. He was recalled by the Ducks on November 18 to replace the injured Mason McTavish. He made his NHL season debut on November 19 playing on the fourth line in a 3–2 win over the Chicago Blackhawks.

== International play ==
Medal record

Representing United States

Ice hockey

World Junior Championships
Gold medal – first place	2021 Canada	

Colangelo was named to Team USA for the 2021 World Junior Ice Hockey Championships. He scored one goal in the tournament as Team USA won gold.

== Career statistics ==
=== Regular season and playoffs ===
			Regular season					Playoffs
Season	Team	League	GP	G	A	Pts	PIM	GP	G	A	Pts	PIM
2016–17	Lawrence Academy	USHS	27	2	12	14	4	—	—	—	—	—
2017–18	Lawrence Academy	USHS	29	13	29	42	8	—	—	—	—	—
2018–19	Lawrence Academy	USHS	28	19	29	48	36	—	—	—	—	—
2018–19	Boston Jr. Bruins	NCDC	3	0	0	0	0	—	—	—	—	—
2018–19	Chicago Steel	USHL	11	3	0	3	4	2	0	0	0	4
2019–20	Chicago Steel	USHL	44	28	30	58	47	—	—	—	—	—
2020–21	Northeastern University	HE	8	0	3	3	2	—	—	—	—	—
2021–22	Northeastern University	HE	29	12	15	27	18	—	—	—	—	—
2022–23	Northeastern University	HE	35	9	15	24	12	—	—	—	—	—
2023–24	Western Michigan University	NCHC	38	24	19	43	23	—	—	—	—	—
2023–24	San Diego Gulls	AHL	4	1	3	4	0	—	—	—	—	—
2023–24	Anaheim Ducks	NHL	3	1	0	1	2	—	—	—	—	—
2024–25	San Diego Gulls	AHL	40	22	18	40	22	—	—	—	—	—
2024–25	Anaheim Ducks	NHL	32	10	2	12	2	—	—	—	—	—
2025–26	Anaheim Ducks	NHL	9	1	0	1	4	—	—	—	—	—
2025–26	San Diego Gulls	AHL	49	12	24	36	25	2	0	0	0	0
NHL totals			44	12	2	14	8	—	—	—	—	—

=== International ===
Year	Team	Event	Result	GP	G	A	Pts	PIM
2018	United States	HG18	4th	5	2	0	2	4
2021	United States	WJC	1st place, gold medalist(s)	7	1	0	1	2
Junior totals				12	3	0	3	6

== Awards and honors ==
Award	Year
College
All-NCHC First Team	2024
USHL
Best plus minus (+32)	2020
