= Matt Gilroy =

American ice hockey player (born 1984)

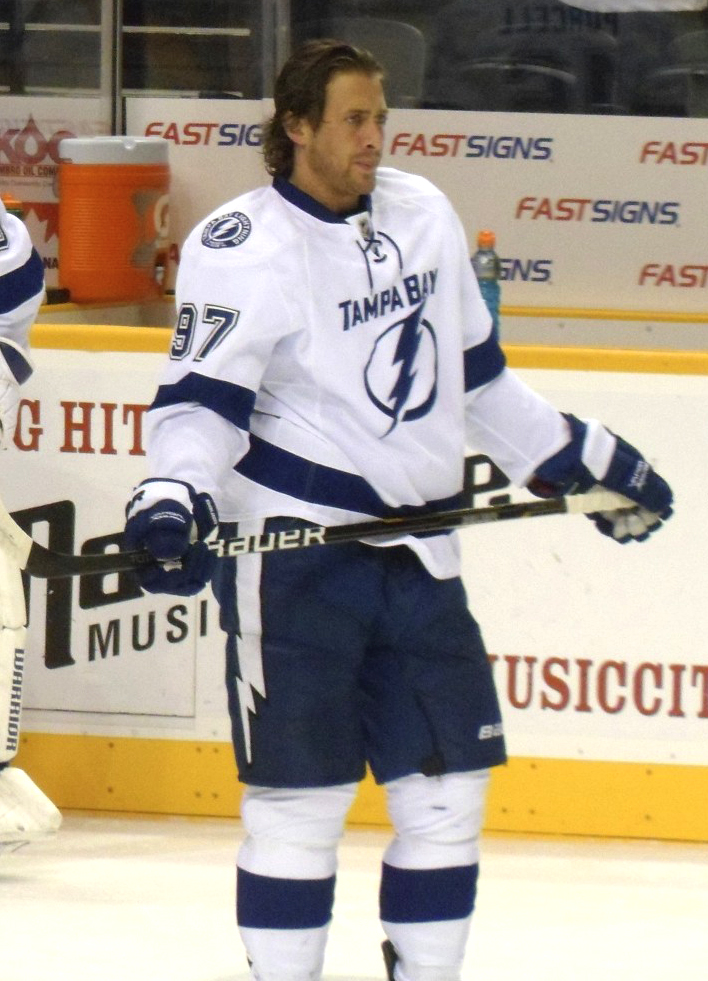
- Gilroy with the Tampa Bay Lightning in 2011
- Born: July 20, 1984 (age 42) North Bellmore, New York, U.S.
- Height: 6 ft 1 in (185 cm)
- Weight: 200 lb (91 kg; 14 st 4 lb)
- Position: Defense
- Shot: Right
- Played for: New York Rangers; Tampa Bay Lightning; Ottawa Senators; Florida Panthers; Atlant Moscow Oblast; Spartak Moscow; Jokerit; SC Rapperswil-Jona Lakers
- National team: United States
- NHL draft: Undrafted
- Playing career: 2009–2019 Coaching career

Current position
- Title: Assistant coach
- Team: Harvard
- Conference: ECAC Hockey

Biographical details
- Education: Boston University

Coaching career (HC unless noted)
- 2020–2021: Los Angeles Jr. Kings (asst.)
- 2022–2023: USNTDP U17 (asst.)
- 2023–2024: USNTDP U18 (asst.)
- 2024–present: Harvard (asst.)

Matthew J. Gilroy (born July 20, 1984) is an American former professional ice hockey defenseman who last played for the SC Rapperswil-Jona Lakers of the National League (NL). Gilroy played in National Hockey League (NHL) with the New York Rangers, Tampa Bay Lightning, Ottawa Senators and the Florida Panthers. He represented the United States in the 2018 Winter Olympics. He played NCAA hockey with Boston University of the Hockey East conference. Gilroy is a Hobey Baker Award winner and NCAA champion with the Terriers in his senior year; he is also a three-time All-American.

== Playing career ==
=== Amateur ===
Gilroy played in the 1998 Quebec International Pee-Wee Hockey Tournament with the New Jersey Devils minor ice hockey team. He later played junior ice hockey in the Eastern Junior Hockey League (EJHL) with the Walpole Jr. Stars (currently known as South Shore Kings), Gilroy joined the college hockey ranks with Boston University of Hockey East in 2005–06. Making the team as a walk-on, he was a natural forward but was forced into the eighth defenseman position, the only available role on the team. After his third college season, Gilroy attracted attention from the NHL as an undrafted free agent, but had intentions of completing his degree at Boston University.

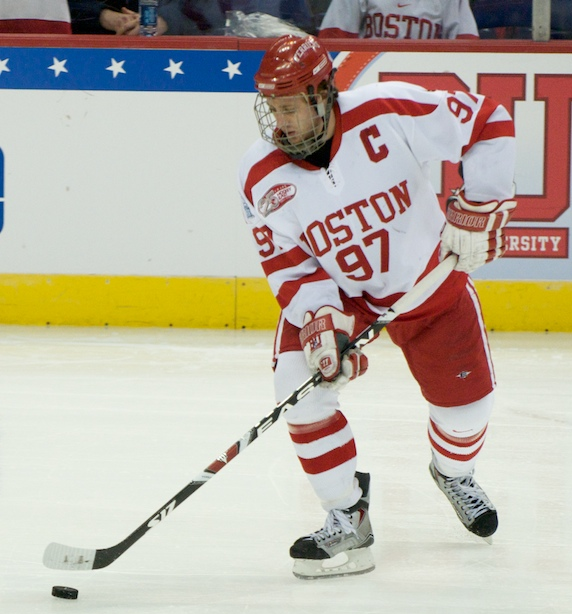
Gilroy at Boston University

In his senior year, in 2008–09, he was named team captain of the Terriers and recorded a college career-high 36 points in 43 games, first among Hockey East defensemen and third in the NCAA. He went on to lead the Terriers to their third Beanpot championship in four years en route to the Frozen Four Tournament. On April 10, 2009, Gilroy was announced as the winner of the 2009 Hobey Baker Award. The next day, the Terriers competed for the NCAA championship against the Miami RedHawks. Trailing 3–1 late in the third period, the Terriers rallied with two goals in the final minute to force overtime. Gilroy earned an assist on Nick Bonino's game-tying goal with 17 seconds left. The Terriers won in overtime, defeating the RedHawks 4–3, making Gilroy just the fifth player to win the Hobey Baker Award and NCAA championship in the same season. He was additionally given his third All-American honor, becoming just the third NCAA player to earn the distinction as many times, after Rick Meagher (1977) and Chris Drury (1998).

=== Professional ===
On April 17, 2009, Gilroy signed a two-year, $3.5-million contract with the New York Rangers. He had initially been linked to both the Toronto Maple Leafs and Vancouver Canucks in contract negotiations.

Gilroy signed a one-year contract as a free agent with the Tampa Bay Lightning on July 2, 2011. During the 2011–12 season, on February 27, 2012, Gilroy was traded to the Ottawa Senators in exchange for fellow defenseman Brian Lee at the NHL trade deadline.

On October 7, 2012, with the 2012–13 NHL lockout in place, Gilroy was signed to an American Hockey League (AHL) contract with the Connecticut Whale, marking a potential return to the New York Rangers organization. At the conclusion of the labor dispute, Gilroy was signed to a one-year contract with the Rangers on January 13, 2013.

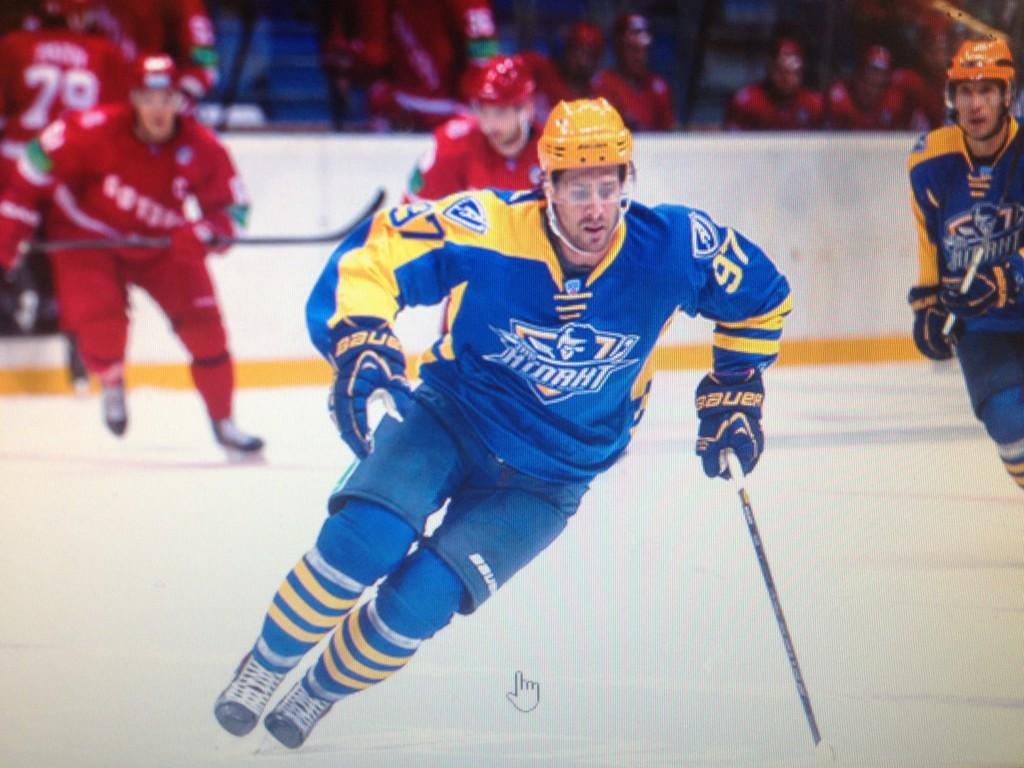
Gilroy with Atlant Moscow Oblast

Gilroy was released to free agency by the Rangers in the off-season and, on July 8, 2013, was signed to a one-year contract with the Florida Panthers, his fourth NHL club. In the 2013–14 season, Gilroy appeared in only 16 games with the struggling Panthers before he was reassigned to the team's AHL affiliate, the San Antonio Rampage, for the remainder of the season.

With limited NHL interest, Gilroy opted to forgo free agency to sign his first European contract on a one-year deal with Russian club Atlant Moscow Oblast of the Kontinental Hockey League (KHL) on June 25, 2014. After one year with Atlant, and partly due to fact that Atlant would not participate in the KHL from the 2015–16 season, he signed with Spartak Moscow.

As a free agent from Finnish KHL club, Jokerit following the 2017–18 season, Gilroy opted to sign a one-year deal with Swiss club, SC Rapperswil-Jona Lakers of the National League on May 15, 2018.

== Personal life ==
Gilroy was born in North Bellmore, New York, to Frank and Peggy Ann Gilroy. Matt Gilroy is one of eight children. His father is a member of the St. John's Basketball Hall of Fame, who was drafted by the Philadelphia 76ers. He graduated in 2003 from St. Mary's High School in Manhasset, captaining the hockey team to two New York state championships. In addition to hockey, Gilroy played lacrosse at St. Mary's and was named team MVP in his junior year, in addition to all-league selections in his junior and senior years.

Gilroy wears the number 97 in remembrance of his deceased brother Timmy, who died as the result of a bicycle accident at eight years old. Separated by 13 months, Matt and Timmy played on the same hockey teams growing up and wore the numbers 98 and 97, respectively, in homage to Wayne Gretzky. Traditional team policy with the Boston University Terriers does not permit players to wear high numbers deemed flamboyant and self-endorsing by head coach Jack Parker. However, given the circumstances, Gilroy was allowed by Parker to wear 97. Gilroy also has an older brother, Frank Jr., who played basketball for St. Mary's High School and St. Anselm College. His younger brother, Kevin, joined Matt on the Terriers for their 2009 championship year. Gilroy is married to Jenny Taft, lead sideline reporter for Fox College Football.

== Career statistics ==
=== Regular season and playoffs ===
			Regular season					Playoffs
Season	Team	League	GP	G	A	Pts	PIM	GP	G	A	Pts	PIM
2001–02	New York Apple Core	Ind	74	25	28	53	8	—	—	—	—	—
2002–03	New York Apple Core	EmJHL	24	15	25	40	2	6	1	5	6	4
2003–04	New York Apple Core	EJHL	65	13	25	38	28	—	—	—	—	—
2004–05	Walpole Stars	EJHL	55	24	29	53	20	—	—	—	—	—
2005–06	Boston University	HE	36	2	6	8	8	—	—	—	—	—
2006–07	Boston University	HE	39	9	17	26	14	—	—	—	—	—
2007–08	Boston University	HE	40	6	15	21	12	—	—	—	—	—
2008–09	Boston University	HE	45	8	29	37	12	—	—	—	—	—
2009–10	New York Rangers	NHL	69	4	11	15	23	—	—	—	—	—
2009–10	Hartford Wolf Pack	AHL	5	0	4	4	4	—	—	—	—	—
2010–11	New York Rangers	NHL	58	3	8	11	14	5	1	0	1	2
2011–12	Tampa Bay Lightning	NHL	53	2	15	17	16	—	—	—	—	—
2011–12	Ottawa Senators	NHL	14	1	2	3	2	3	0	0	0	0
2012–13	Connecticut Whale	AHL	34	6	9	15	14	—	—	—	—	—
2012–13	New York Rangers	NHL	15	0	0	0	6	—	—	—	—	—
2013–14	Florida Panthers	NHL	16	1	1	2	6	—	—	—	—	—
2013–14	San Antonio Rampage	AHL	42	10	11	21	0	—	—	—	—	—
2014–15	Atlant Moscow Oblast	KHL	60	9	24	33	14	—	—	—	—	—
2015–16	Spartak Moscow	KHL	49	6	9	15	12	—	—	—	—	—
2016–17	Spartak Moscow	KHL	57	7	31	38	8	—	—	—	—	—
2017–18	Jokerit	KHL	55	7	20	27	10	9	1	10	11	0
2018–19	SC Rapperswil–Jona Lakers	NL	13	1	3	4	2	—	—	—	—	—
NHL totals			225	11	37	48	67	8	1	0	1	2
KHL totals			221	29	84	113	44	9	1	10	11	0

=== International ===
Year	Team	Event	Result	GP	G	A	Pts	PIM
2010	United States	WC	13th	6	3	1	4	0
2018	United States	OG	7th	5	0	1	1	2
Senior totals				11	3	2	5	2

== Awards and honors ==
Award	Year
All-Hockey East First Team	2006–07
AHCA East Second-Team All-American	2006–07
All-Hockey East First Team	2007–08
AHCA East First-Team All-American	2007–08
All-Hockey East First Team	2008–09
AHCA East First-Team All-American	2008–09
Hockey East All-Tournament Team	2009
Hobey Baker Award	2009

Awards and achievements
Preceded by Kevin Porter	Winner of the Hobey Baker Award; 2008–09	Succeeded by Blake Geoffrion
