= Thunder Hockey Club =

- City: Exeter, New Hampshire
- League: United States Premier Hockey League (USPHL); National Collegiate Development Conference (NCDC)
- Conference: New England
- Division: Eastern
- Founded: 2019
- Home arena: The Rinks At Exeter
- Colors: Green, black and white
- Owner: Dan Hodge
- General manager: Dan Hodge
- Head coach: Dan Hodge
- Affiliates: Thunder Hockey Club (Tier III)

Franchise history
- 2019–2024: Twin City Thunder
- 2024–Present: Thunder Hockey Club

The Thunder Hockey Club are a Tier II junior ice hockey team playing in the United States Premier Hockey League's (USPHL) National Collegiate Development Conference (NCDC) division. The Thunder play their home games at The Rinks At Exeter in Exeter, New Hampshire.

== History ==
In December of 2017, the USPHL announced that they had approved the addition of an expansion franchise to the Premier division for Auburn, Maine. The franchise was a joint venture of Ben Gray and Dan Hodge, the latter of whom would also serve as both coach and general manager. After hitting the ice for its first season in 2018, the USHPL allowed the same ownership group to found a second club that would join the NCDC for the 2019–20 season. The timing could hardly have been worse for the club as the COVID-19 pandemic hit the following spring and caused disruptions all over the globe. After an abbreviated second season, Gray sold his interest in the team to Hodge, who would continue as the sole owner.

The team finally began showing signs of life after the pandemic was over and posted two winning seasons before slipping back down towards the bottom of the standings in 2024. That spring, the Twin City Thunder announced that they were relocating both their Tier II and Tier III clubs of the same name to Exeter, New Hampshire. The move took place in part because the team wanted to cut down on travel costs and their new home would put the club just 35 miles away from both the Northern Cyclones and Islanders Hockey Club, their two closest rivals.

== Season-by-season records ==
| Season | GP | W | L | OTL | SOL | Pts | GF | GA | Regular season finish | Playoffs |
|---|---|---|---|---|---|---|---|---|---|---|
Twin City Thunder
| 2019–20 | 50 | 26 | 22 | 2 | 0 | 54 | 170 | 164 | t-8th of 13, NCDC | Did not qualify |
| 2020–21 | 31 | 12 | 16 | 1 | 2 | 27 | 91 | 106 | t-5th of 7, North Div. t-10th of 13, NCDC | Won Div. Round-Robin, 3–1 (Northern Cyclones), 3–2 (New Hampshire Jr. Monarchs); Won Div. Semifinal series, 2–1 (Northern Cyclones); Lost Frozen Finals Semifinal, 1–6 (Jersey Hitmen) |
| 2021–22 | 48 | 24 | 18 | 2 | 4 | 54 | 151 | 139 | t-3rd of 7, North Div. t-5th of 13, NCDC | Lost Div. Semifinal series, 1–2 (Boston Junior Bruins) |
| 2022–23 | 50 | 25 | 21 | 2 | 2 | 54 | 146 | 143 | 5th of 7, North Div. t-10th of 14, NCDC | Won Div. Qualifier, 5–4 (OT) (Boston Advantage); Won Div. Semifinal series, 2–1 (Northern Cyclones); Lost Div. Final series, 0–2 (South Shore Kings) |
| 2023–24 | 52 | 16 | 31 | 4 | 1 | 37 | 107 | 169 | 6th of 6, New England; 17th of 18, NCDC | Did not qualify |
Thunder Hockey Club
| 2024–25 | 54 | 20 | 31 | 0 | 3 | 43 | 123 | 179 | 6th of 9, New England; 15th of 22, NCDC | Did not qualify |
| 2025–26 | 54 | 21 | 26 | 3 | 4 | 49 | 152 | 175 | 4th of 6, N England East; 22nd of 33, NCDC | Lost Div Semifinals 0-3 (South Shore Kings) |
