= P.A.L. Jr. Islanders =

- City: Hauppauge, New York
- League: United States Premier Hockey League; National Collegiate Development Conference
- Conference: Atlantic
- Founded: 2013
- Home arena: Northwell Health Ice Center
- Colors: Orange, white, and blue
- Head coach: Mike Marcou
- Affiliates: P.A.L. Jr. Islanders (Tier III)

Franchise history
- 2013–present: P.A.L. Jr. Islanders

Championships
- Regular season titles: 1: 2024
- Division titles: 2: 2024, 2025
- Playoff championships: 1: 2023

The P.A.L. Jr. Islanders (Pride and Athletics for Life) are a Tier II junior ice hockey team playing in the National Collegiate Development Conference (NCDC) of the United States Premier Hockey League (USPHL). The organization operates several other teams at varying levels of play with two others in the USPHL's Premier and Elite divisions that are also called P.A.L. Jr. Islanders.

== History ==
The parent organization was founded a few years after the New York Islanders hit the ice. The two have remain tied together ever since with the Jr. Islanders helping to lay the groundwork for junior hockey throughout Long Island. The organization joined the USPHL Premier Division as a founding member in 2013. Two years later, a secondary club was formed and joined the Elite Division. In 2017, the USPHL announced that it would be founding a new Tier II division called the National Collegiate Development Conference. Both of the Jr. Islanders program were promoted one level (Premier joining NCDC and Elite joining Premier).

Though the club initially struggled to compete in the USPHL, since 2020, the Islanders have posted five consecutive winning seasons and were league champions in 2023.

== Season-by-season records ==
Season	GP	W	L	OTL	SOL	Pts	GF	GA	Regular season finish	Playoffs
Premier Division
2013–14	48	22	21	3	2	49	134	147	6th of 9, Premier	Lost Quarterfinal series, 1–2 (South Shore Kings)
2014–15	50	27	19	4	-	58	165	170	t-4th of 11, Premier	Lost Quarterfinal series, 0–2 (Islanders Hockey Club)
2015–16	44	28	16	0	-	56	177	160	5th of 12, Premier	Lost Quarterfinal series, 0–2 (South Shore Kings)
2016–17	45	17	26	2	-	36	124	174	9th of 10, Premier	Won Preliminary, 3–1 (Philadelphia Jr. Flyers); Lost Quarterfinal series, 0–2 (Islanders Hockey Club)
NCDC Division
2017–18	50	19	27	4	–	42	142	170	9th of 11, NCDC	Did not qualify
2018–19	50	14	31	4	–	33	156	197	10th of 10, NCDC	Did not qualify
2019–20	50	28	16	3	3	62	160	146	t–4th of 13, NCDC	Postseason cancelled due to COVID-19 pandemic
2020–21	41	20	14	3	4	47	143	127	3rd of 6, South Div. 4th of 13, NCDC	Won Div. Quarterfinal series, 2–0 (Philadelphia Hockey Club); Lost Div. Semifinal series, 0–2 (Rockets Hockey Club)
2021–22	49	25	21	2	1	53	135	142	4th of 6, South Div. 8th of 13, NCDC	Lost Div. Semifinal series, 0–2 (Jersey Hitmen)
2022–23	50	34	11	1	4	73	192	132	2nd of 7, South Div. 2nd of 14, NCDC	Won Div. Semifinal series, 2–0 (Rockets Hockey Club); Won Div. Final series, 2–0 (Mercer Chiefs); Won Championship series, 2–1 (South Shore Kings)
2023–24	52	40	7	4	1	85	185	113	1st of 6, Atlantic Conf. 1st of 18, NCDC	Won Conf. Semifinal series, 2–1 (Jersey Hitmen); Won Reg. Semifinal series, 3–1 (Mercer Chiefs); Lost Regional Final series, 1–3 (South Shore Kings)
2024–25	54	41	7	3	3	88	205	118	1st of 7, Atlantic Div. 2nd of 22, NCDC	Won Div. Semifinal series, 3–0 (Rockets Hockey Club); Lost Div. Final series, 2–3 (Mercer Chiefs)
2025–26	54	36	13	2	3	77	163	117	1st of 7, Atlantic Conf. 5th of 33, NCDC	Won Conf. Semifinal, 2–1 (Mercer Chiefs); Won Conf Finals, 3–2 (Jersey Hitmen) advance to Dineen Cup; Lost Game, 1–2 (Grand Junction River Hawks); Lost Game, 2-3 (South Shore Kings) eliminated 0-2 dble. elim.
