= Eastern States Hockey League =

- Sport: Ice hockey
- Founded: 2003
- Folded: 2013
- CEO: Andy Richards
- No. of teams: 12
- Country: United States
- Last champion: Boch Blazers
- Website: chajrhockey.com

The Eastern States Hockey League (ESHL) was an American Tier III Junior ice hockey league. It stated goal is that it develops high school age players to hockey skills needed for higher levels of Junior, college hockey, and professional hockey. On Labor Day 2011, the Continental Hockey Association officially changed its name to the Eastern States Hockey League. After the 2012–13 season, the ESHL disbanded after several teams left to join the newly renamed Eastern Hockey League or one of the newly formed United States Premier Hockey League Elite or Empire Divisions.

Team	Centre
New York Applecore	Long Beach, New York
Bay State Breakers	Rockland, Massachusetts
Boston Junior Bruins	Marlboro, Massachusetts
Brewster Bulldogs	Brewster, New York
Frederick Freeze	Frederick, Maryland
Jersey Wildcats	Randolph, New Jersey
Boch Blazers	Dedham, Massachusetts
Islanders Hockey Club	Tyngsborough, Massachusetts
New Hampshire Jr. Monarchs	Hooksett, New Hampshire
Philadelphia Revolution	Warminster, Pennsylvania
Springfield Pics	West Springfield, Massachusetts
Suffolk Juniors	Hauppauge, New York

== Former teams ==
Indiana Thunder
New Jersey Jr Titans
Mass Maple Leafs
Metro Fighting Moose
Michigan Mountain Cats
Philadelphia Jr. Blazers
Pittsburgh Amateur Penguins South
Pittsburgh Jr. Penguins
Potomac Patriots
Reading Rails
South Shore Kings
Vineland Junior Eagles
