= Shane Lachance =

American ice hockey player (born 2003)

- Born: August 30, 2003 (age 22) Andover, Massachusetts, U.S.
- Height: 6 ft 4 in (193 cm)
- Weight: 195 lb (88 kg; 13 st 13 lb)
- Position: Forward
- Shoots: Left
- NHL team (P) Cur. team: New Jersey Devils; Utica Comets (AHL)
- NHL draft: 186th overall, 2021; Edmonton Oilers
- Playing career: 2025–present

Shane Lachance (born August 30, 2003) is an American ice hockey forward for the Utica Comets of the American Hockey League (AHL) while under contract to the New Jersey Devils of the National Hockey League (NHL).

== Playing career ==
Lachance was selected 186th overall, in the sixth round of the 2021 NHL entry draft by the Edmonton Oilers after recording 15 points in 25 games for the Boston Junior Bruins of the National Collegiate Development Conference.

In his first season with the Youngstown Phantoms in the United States Hockey League (USHL) in 2021–22, Lachance recorded 23 points in 55 games. The following year, he was named captain, recording 33 goals and 54 points in 62 games and leading the team to a Clark Cup championship.

As a freshman with Boston University in the 2023–24 season, Lachance rose through the lineup quickly, earning a spot on the Terriers' top line alongside Macklin Celebrini, He finished the season with 13 goals and 27 points in 40 games. Entering the 2024–25 season, Lachance was named co-captain of the Terriers, becoming the first sophomore captain in program history. Appearing in all 40 games that season, he recorded 12 goals and 30 points.

On March 4, 2025, the Oilers traded Lachance's NHL signing rights to the New Jersey Devils as part of a three-way trade where the Devils retained salary on the Oilers' acquisition of Trent Frederic from the Boston Bruins. On April 16, they signed him to a two-year, entry-level contract beginning in the fall, and an American Hockey League (AHL) contract to finish the season with their minor league affiliate, the Utica Comets.

Entering the 2025–26 season, Lachance was named to the Devils' opening night roster. The next day, however, he was assigned to Utica. After 11 games with the Comets, Lachance was recalled by the Devils and made his NHL debut on November 15, 2025, against the Washington Capitals.

== Personal life ==
Lachance is the son of Scott Lachance, who played in the National Hockey League for 13 years and who, like Shane, played college ice hockey for Boston University. His grandfather is Jack Parker, longtime Boston University coach. He has two siblings, Jake and Ryan. While a student at Boston University, he majored in hospitality administration.

== Career statistics ==
=== Regular season and playoffs ===
			Regular season					Playoffs
Season	Team	League	GP	G	A	Pts	PIM	GP	G	A	Pts	PIM
2018–19	Andover High School	USHS-MA	—	6	15	21	—	—	—	—	—	—
2019–20	Tabor Academy	USHS-Prep	28	13	9	22	—	—	—	—	—	—
2020–21	Boston Junior Bruins	NCDC	25	6	9	12	14	6	1	5	6	2
2021–22	Youngstown Phantoms	USHL	55	11	12	23	67	2	0	0	0	2
2022–23	Youngstown Phantoms	USHL	62	33	21	54	53	9	3	3	6	2
2023–24	Boston University	HE	40	13	14	27	12	—	—	—	—	—
2024–25	Boston University	HE	40	12	18	30	28	—	—	—	—	—
2024–25	Utica Comets	AHL	2	1	1	2	0	—	—	—	—	—
2025–26	Utica Comets	AHL	62	10	15	25	18	—	—	—	—	—
2025–26	New Jersey Devils	NHL	1	0	0	0	0	—	—	—	—	—
NHL totals			1	0	0	0	0	—	—	—	—	—
