= Utica Jr. Comets =

- City: Utica, New York
- League: United States Premier Hockey League (USPHL); National Collegiate Development Conference (NCDC)
- Conference: New England
- Division: Central
- Founded: 1999
- Home arena: Adirondack Bank Center
- Colors: Red, white and black
- Head coach: Lou Educate
- Affiliates: Utica Jr. Comets (Tier III)

Franchise history
- 2017–2019: Syracuse Stars
- 2019–Present: Utica Jr. Comets

Championships
- Regular season titles: 2: 2020, 2022
- Division titles: 3: 2018, 2021, 2022
- Conference titles: 1: 2020
- Playoff championships: 2: 2021, 2023

The Utica Jr. Comets are a Tier II junior ice hockey team playing in the United States Premier Hockey League's (USPHL) National Collegiate Development Conference (NCDC) division. The Jr. Comets play their home games at Adirondack Bank Center in Utica, New York.

== History ==
Syracuse Stars logo

The franchise was originally formed in 1999 when the Bay State Breakers organization joined the Eastern Junior Hockey League. After the Breakers had become members of the USPHL in 2013, the club decided to shift its focus back towards youth hockey and sold its Premier Division team in 2015. The franchise was renamed as the Syracuse Stars, taking the same name as an earlier junior club, and reached an affiliation agreement with the Syracuse Crunch of the American Hockey League. In 2017, the USPHL announced that they were founding a Tier II division and invited all of their member organizations to found clubs for the new level. The Stars were one of the founding members of the National Collegiate Development Conference.

In 2019, the franchise announced that it was merging with the already extant Utica Jr. Comets youth organization. The club relocated to Utica and took on the name and colors of their namesake which were nearly identical to those of the Utica Comets, another AHL franchise. The professional Comets relocated in the summer of 2021, however, at the same time the New Jersey Devils moved their minor league affiliate to the region and they subsequently took up the mantle of the Comets. The result of this was that the Jr. Comets chanced their color scheme but the club was otherwise unaffected.

== Season-by-season records ==
Season	GP	W	L	OTL	SOL	Pts	GF	GA	Regular season finish	Playoffs
Syracuse Stars
2017–18	50	19	22	9	–	47	150	199	7th of 11, NCDC	Lost Div. Semifinal series, 1–2 (Boston Jr. Bruins)
2018–19	50	27	19	3	1	58	173	165	7th of 11, NCDC	Lost Div. Semifinal series, 0–2 (Connecticut Jr. Rangers)
Utica Jr. Comets
2019–20	50	22	24	4	0	48	161	177	10th of 13, NCDC	Did not qualify
2020–21	36	13	20	3	0	29	104	140	5th of 6, South Div. 9th of 13, NCDC	Lost Div. Quarterfinal series, 0–2 (Connecticut Jr. Rangers)
2021–22	49	21	24	4	0	46	155	187	5th of 6, South Div. t-10th of 13, NCDC	Did not qualify
2022–23	50	18	28	3	1	40	157	204	6th of 7, South Div. 12th of 14, NCDC	Did not qualify
2023–24	52	30	17	4	1	65	188	154	3rd of 6, New England Conf. 6th of 18, NCDC	Lost Conf. Semifinal series, 0–2 (South Shore Kings)
2024–25	54	31	17	3	3	68	194	159	3rd of 9, New England Div. 7th of 22, NCDC	Lost Div. Semifinal series, 1–3 (Northern Cyclones)
2025–26	52	42	7	2	3	89	230	117	1st of 6, New England Cent; 3rd of 33, NCDC	Won Div Semifinal series, 3-0 (Boston Junior Bruins); Won Div Finals 3-1 (Worcester Jr. Railers); Advance to New England Conf Round Robin; Won Game 4-3 (Lewiston MAINEiacs); 2nd RR gm cancelled Lost Conf Finals 0-2 (South Shore Kings)
