= Ice Vault Arena =

Multi-purpose arena in Wayne, New Jersey

Coordinates: 40.964582°N 74.228479°W

- The Vault
- Interactive map of Ice Vault Arena
- Former names: North Fork Ice Vault Arena (2003–mid-2010s); Capital One Ice Vault Arena (mid-2010s)
- Location: 10 Nevins Road; Wayne, New Jersey 07470
- Capacity: 600

Construction
- Opened: 2003

Tenants
- Jersey Hitmen (EJHL/USPHL) (2003–present); William Paterson Pioneers (ACHA) (2007–present); New Jersey Outlaws (FHL) (2011–2012)

The Ice Vault Arena (formerly named Capital One Ice Vault Arena and North Fork Ice Vault Arena) is a 600-seat multi-purpose arena in Wayne, New Jersey. Built in 2003, it is home to the Jersey Hitmen of the United States Premier Hockey League and the William Paterson University Pioneers of the American Collegiate Hockey Association's Super East Collegiate Hockey League. In the fall of 2011, it became home to the New Jersey Outlaws of the Federal Hockey League for one season, before the team moved to Williamsport, Pennsylvania.

Public skating, and stick and puck hours of operation vary based upon events scheduled. The arena also has a cafe, pro shop, and a pub called, "In The Crease Sports Pub". It formerly had an arcade.

By the mid-2010s, Capital One bought the naming rights of the arena, making it Capital One Ice Vault Arena.
