= Boston Advantage =

- City: Hingham, Massachusetts
- League: United States Premier Hockey League; National Collegiate Development Conference
- Founded: 2020
- Folded: 2023
- Home arena: Pilgrim Skating Arena
- Colors: Cream, blue and black
- Affiliates: Boston Advantage (Tier III)

Franchise history
- 2020–2023: Boston Advantage

The Boston Advantage were a Tier II junior ice hockey team that last played in the United States Premier Hockey League's (USPHL) National Collegiate Development Conference (NCDC). The Advantage played their home games at Pilgrim Skating Arena.

== History ==
In June of 2020, the USPHL announced the addition of the Boston Advantage to the league with their new Tier II franchise joining the NCDC in 2020–21. After three seasons, the USPHL removed the Advantage as well as the New Hampshire Junior Monarchs from the league without comment. Rumors were that both teams failed to pay league dues but the USPHL remained silent about their decision.

== Season-by-season records ==
Season	GP	W	L	OTL	SOL	Pts	GF	GA	Regular season finish	Playoffs
2020–21	43	10	26	3	4	27	107	164	t-5th of 7, North t-10th of 13, NCDC	Did not qualify
2021–22	48	21	23	3	1	46	140	180	6th of 7, North t-10th of 13, NCDC	Did not qualify
2022–23	50	27	17	5	1	60	152	167	3rd of 7, North; 5th of 14, NCDC	Lost Div. Qualifier, 4–5 (OT) (Twin City Thunder)
