= Mercer Chiefs =

- City: Hamilton, New Jersey
- League: United States Premier Hockey League; National Collegiate Development Conference (NCDC)
- Conference: Atlantic
- Founded: 2022
- Home arena: Ice Land Skating Center
- Colors: Red, black, and old gold
- Owner: Black Bear Sports Group
- General manager: Rob Broderick
- Head coach: Rob Broderick
- Media: BlackBearTV
- Affiliates: Mercer Chiefs (Tier III)

Franchise history
- 2022–present: Mercer Chiefs

The Mercer Chiefs are a Tier II junior ice hockey team playing in the United States Premier Hockey League's (USPHL) National Collegiate Development Conference (NCDC) division. The Chiefs play their home games at Ice Land Skating Center in Hamilton, New Jersey.

== History ==
In 2022, the USPHL admitted the Mercer Chiefs as an expansion franchise for the top division of league play. At the time, the Mercer Chiefs were an established youth hockey organization but had yet to field a full junior program (under-20) The Chiefs shifted their under-18 team from the Atlantic Youth Hockey League to the NCDC and established a second team to compete in the USPHL's division.

== Season-by-season records ==
Season	GP	W	L	OTL	SOL	Pts	GF	GA	Regular season finish	Playoffs
2022–23	50	26	20	1	3	56	147	157	4th of 7, South Div. 8th of 14, NCDC	Won Div. Semifinal series, 2–0 (Jersey Hitmen); Lost Div. Final series, 0–2 (P.A.L. Jr. Islanders)
2023–24	52	27	22	2	1	57	169	173	2nd of 6, Atlantic Conf. 8th of 18, NCDC	Won Conf. Semifinal series, 2–1 (Rockets Hockey Club); Lost Conf. Final series, 1–3 (P.A.L. Jr. Islanders)
2024–25	54	38	15	1	0	77	195	140	2nd of 7, Atlantic Div. t-5th of 22, NCDC	Won Div. Semifinal series, 3–1 (Jersey Hitmen); Won Conf. Final series, 3–2 (P.A.L. Jr. Islanders); Double-elimination Finals; Won, 4–3 (OT) vs. (Northern Cyclones); Lost Winners Semifinal, 0–1 (Idaho Falls Spud Kings); Lost Losers Final, 0–4 (South Shore Kings)
2025-26	52	27	23	1	2	58	167	180	4th of 7, Atlantic Conf. 17th of 33, NCDC	Won Div Play-in, 2–1 (Wilkes-Barre/Scranton Knights); Lost Div. Semifinal series, 2–3 (P.A.L. Jr. Islanders)
