= Connecticut Jr. Rangers =

- City: Stamford, Connecticut
- League: United States Premier Hockey League; National Collegiate Development Conference
- Conference: Atlantic
- Founded: 2017
- Home arena: Chelsea Piers Connecticut
- Colors: Blue, white, and red
- Head coach: Jim Henkel
- Affiliates: Connecticut Jr. Rangers (Tier III)

Franchise history
- 2017–present: Connecticut Jr. Rangers

The Connecticut Jr. Rangers are a Tier II junior ice hockey team playing in the United States Premier Hockey League's (USPHL) National Collegiate Development Conference (NCDC). The Jr. Rangers plays their home games at Chelsea Piers Connecticut.

== History ==
In 2012, several teams decided to leave the Eastern Junior Hockey League and form their own league. The Connecticut Yankees, who had been in operation as an independent junior club since 1989, joined with the breakaway group and became founding members of the United States Premier Hockey League in 2013. In 2016, the league petitioned USA Hockey to begin sponsoring a separate Tier II league. In December, the USPHL petition was denied. As a result, the USPHL left USA Hockey oversight and began operating their new division independently. The second Connecticut Jr. Rangers team began that fall and both teams remain in operation (as of 2025).

== Season-by-season records ==
Season	GP	W	L	OTL	SOL	Pts	GF	GA	Regular season finish	Playoffs
2017–18	50	27	20	3	–	57	174	155	5th of 11, USPHL	Won Quarterfinal series, 2–1 (South Shore Kings); Lost Semifinal series, 0–2 (Islanders Hockey Club)
2018–19	50	30	17	1	–	63	178	148	3rd of 10, USPHL	Won Quarterfinal series, 2–0 (Syracuse Jr. Stars); Won Semifinal series, 2–0 (Islanders Hockey Club); Lost Championship series, 1–2 (Boston Jr. Bruins)
2019–20	50	27	14	9	–	63	168	141	3rd of 13, USPHL	Postseason cancelled due to COVID-19 pandemic
2020–21	35	17	15	2	1	37	96	113	4th of 6, South Div. 7th of 13, USPHL	Won Div. Quarterfinal series, 2–0 (Utica Jr. Comets); Lost Div. Semifinal series, 0–2 (Jersey Hitmen)
2021–22	49	19	24	4	2	44	152	184	6th of 6, South Div. 12th of 13, USPHL	Did not qualify
2022–23	50	23	19	5	3	54	153	154	5th of 7, South Div. t–9th of 14, USPHL	Did not qualify
2023–24	52	22	27	3	0	47	147	164	t–5th of 6, Atlantic Conf. t–14th of 18, USPHL	Lost Conf. Qualifier, 2–6 (Jersey Hitmen)
2024–25	53	18	31	1	3	40	123	169	7th of 7, Atlantic Div. 17th of 22, USPHL	Did not qualify
2025–26	54	24	27	1	2	51	171	205	6th of 7, Atlantic Conf. 21st of 33, USPHL	Did not qualify
