= The Rinks At Exeter =

- Interactive map of The Rinks At Exeter
- Former names: NHL Skate at Exeter
- Location: 40 Industrial Drive‍ Exeter, NH, 03833
- Coordinates: 42.99433°N 70.96777°W
- Owner: Black Bear Sports Group, Inc.
- Surface: 200 x 85 ft (hockey) (Two)

Construction
- Opened: December 1998; 27 years ago
- Cost: $8.5 million

Tenants
- Seacoast Spartans (2019–2025); Thunder Hockey Club (2024–Present)

Website
- https://www.therinksatexeter.com/

The Rinks At Exeter is an indoor ice hockey arena located in Exeter, New Hampshire. The facility sports two full-sized ice rinks and serves as a community rink while also being home to several local clubs and organizations.

== History ==
Opened in 1998 as the 'NHL Skate at Exeter', The Rinks At Exeter have served as a public skating rink for the Exeter region ever since. While the arena has passed through several ownership groups, it has never stopped seeing a large volume of foot traffic, reportedly seeing upwards of 850,000 visitors per year. Part of the reason for such a large number is that the rinks serve as the home for several clubs including Phillips Exeter Academy, Seacost Performance Academy and the Ice Skating Club of Exeter.

Recently, the rink has been home to junior hockey teams as well, hosting games for both the Seacoast Spartans and Thunder Hockey Club.
