= Rockets Hockey Club =

- City: Bridgewater, New Jersey
- League: United States Premier Hockey League; National Collegiate Development Conference (NCDC)
- Conference: Atlantic
- Founded: 2004
- Home arena: Bridgewater Sports Arena
- Colors: Red, black and silver
- Owner: Rockets Sports Group
- Affiliates: Rockets Hockey Club (Tier III)

Franchise history
- 2017–2019: New Jersey Rockets
- 2019–present: Rockets Hockey Club

The Rockets Hockey Club, are a Tier II junior ice hockey team from Bridgewater, New Jersey. The Rockets play their home games at the Bridgewater Sports Arena.

== History ==
The New Jersey Rockets youth hockey organization was formed in 1970 to serve as a local developmental program. The club later reached an arrangement with the New Jersey Devils of the NHL for the use of the Meadowlands Arena and later the Prudential Center. In the early part of the 21st century, the Rockets expanded their footprint with the addition of a junior franchises to both the Metropolitan Junior Hockey League and the Atlantic Junior Hockey League (AJHL). This team was a founding member of the AJHL was it was organized in 2004. When the AJHL merged with the Eastern Junior Hockey League in 2013, the Rockets then became founding members of the successor league, the Eastern Hockey League. In 2016, the MJHL franchise withdrew and joined the EHL's Elite (lower) division. One year later, New Jersey left the EHL and joined the rival United States Premier Hockey League with their upper club joining the National Collegiate Development Conference (Tier II) and the lower club becoming members of the Premier Division (Tier III). That same year, a third franchise was created and joined the USPHL's Elite Division. The entire organization rebranded as the Rockets Hockey Club in 2019.

The organization previously fielded a team at the Tier III former Junior B level in the Metropolitan Junior Hockey League (MJHL) and in the EHL-Elite Division. The organization also fields a women's team in the New England Women's Junior Hockey League (NEWJHL), and youth hockey select teams at the Midget U18, Midget 16U, Bantam, Peewee, and Squirt and Mite levels and girls teams at the U14, U16, and U19 levels.

== Season-by-season records ==
Season	GP	W	L	OTL	SOL	Pts	GF	GA	Regular season finish	Playoffs
2017–18	50	6	42	2	—	14	96	253	11th of 11, NCDC	Did not qualify
2018–19	50	19	24	7	—	45	149	189	9th of 12, NCDC	Did not qualify
2019–20	50	15	28	7	—	37	160	204	12th of 13, NCDC	Did not qualify
2020–21	44	35	5	4	—	74	176	80	2nd of 6, South; 2nd of 13, NCDC	Won Div. Semifinal series, 2–0 (P.A.L. Jr. Islanders); Won Semifinal, 10–2 (Boston Junior Bruins); Lost Championship, 2–5 (Jersey Hitmen)
2021–22	49	29	14	6	—	64	185	156	2nd of 6, South; 2nd of 13, NCDC	Won Div. Semifinal series, 2–0 (Philadelphia Hockey Club); Lost Div. Finals series, 1–2 (Jersey Hitmen)
2022–23	50	26	19	3	2	57	196	187	3rd of 7, South; 7th of 13, NCDC	Lost Div. Semifinal series, 0–2 (P.A.L. Jr. Islanders)
2023–24	52	21	23	6	2	50	164	194	3rd of 6, Atlantic; 12th of 18, NCDC	Lost Div. Semifinal series, 1–2 (Mercer Chiefs)
2024–25	54	26	23	4	1	57	162	161	4th of 7, Atlantic; 12th of 22, NCDC	Won Play in Series, 2–0 (West Chester Wolves); Lost Div. Semifinal series, 0–3 (P.A.L. Jr. Islanders)
2025–26	54	39	22	3	0	67	162	126	3rd of 7, Atlantic; 13th of 33, NCDC	Lost Div. Semifinal series, 1–3 (Jersey Hitmen)

== Alumni ==
The Rockets have produced a number of alumni playing in higher levels of junior hockey, NCAA Division I, Division III college and professional programs, including:

- John Carlson — Washington Capitals 2008 NHL Entry Draft - Washington Capitals (NHL), Hershey Bears (AHL)
- Marc Del Gaizo — Nashville Predators 2019 NHL Entry Draft - Nashville Predators (NHL)
- David Kolomatis — Los Angeles Kings 2009 NHL Entry Draft - Manchester Monarchs (AHL)
- Brian Mullen — Winnipeg Jets 1980 NHL Entry Draft - New York Islanders (NHL)
- Jeremy Roenick — Chicago Blackhawks 1988 NHL Entry Draft - San Jose Sharks (NHL)
- Bobby Sanguinetti — New York Rangers 2006 NHL Entry Draft - New York Rangers (NHL)

== Former logos ==
former logo
