= Empire Junior Hockey League =

- Sport: Ice Hockey
- Folded: 2013 – Absorbed by USPHL
- CEO: Don Kirnan
- No. of teams: 31
- Country: United States
- Last champion: Florida Junior Blades
- Website: empirehockey.com

The Empire Junior Hockey League (EmJHL) was a USA Hockey-sanctioned Tier III junior ice hockey league. The league was classified as Tier III Junior B until the 2011–12 season when USA Hockey combined the Tier III Junior A and Junior B classifications.

== History ==
On February 25, 2010, the Empire Junior Hockey League Board of Governors voted to eliminate 20-year-old players from the League by changing the restriction of no more than four 20-year-olds per team to a maximum of two per team in the 2010–11 season. Starting with the 2011–12 season there would be no 20-year-olds in the league.

In 2013, the Empire League and the Eastern Elite Hockey League both agreed to affiliate with the newly formed United States Premier Hockey League becoming the Empire and Elite Divisions, respectively. Starting with the 2015–16 season the USPHL's Empire Division was renamed to the USP3 Division.

== Participating teams ==
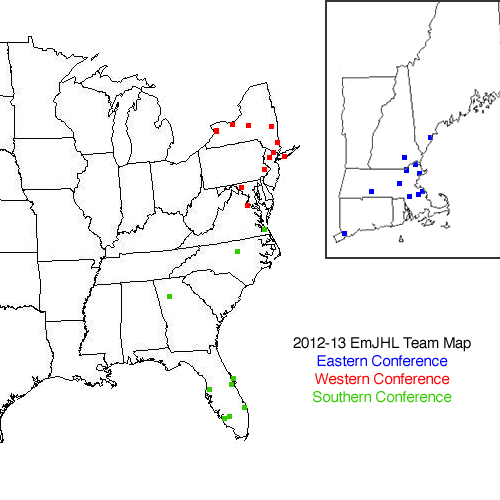
2012-13 EmJHL team map

As of June 2012, the following teams made up the league in its final season:

Eastern Conference
Team	Location
Bay State Breakers	Rockland, Massachusetts
Boston Bandits	Bridgewater, Massachusetts
Boston Jr. Bruins	Marlborough, Massachusetts
Connecticut Oilers	Norwalk, Connecticut
Islanders Hockey Club	Tyngsborough, Massachusetts
New Hampshire Jr. Monarchs	Hooksett, New Hampshire
Portland Jr. Pirates	Saco, Maine
Salem Ice Dogs	Salem, Massachusetts
South Shore Kings	Foxboro, Massachusetts
Springfield Pics	West Springfield, Massachusetts
Valley Jr. Warriors	Haverhill, Massachusetts
Western Conference
Team	Location
Adirondack Jr. Wings	Troy, New York
Brewster Bulldogs	Brewster, New York
Buffalo Stars	Cheektowaga, New York
Frederick Freeze	Frederick, Maryland
New Jersey Hitmen	Wayne, New Jersey
Jersey Wildcats	Randolph, New Jersey
Maksymum Jr. Hockey Club	Rochester, New York
New York Apple Core	Long Beach, New York
Philadelphia Revolution	Warminster, Pennsylvania
P.A.L Juniors Islanders	Hauppauge, New York
Syracuse Stars	Cicero, New York
Southern Conference
Team	Location
Atlanta Jr. Knights	Atlanta, Georgia
East Coast Eagles	Wake Forest, North Carolina
Florida Jr. Blades	Estero, Florida
Florida Eels	Fort Myers, Florida
Hampton Roads Whalers	Chesapeake, Virginia
Palm Beach Hawks	Lake Worth, Florida
Potomac Patriots	Woodbridge, Virginia
Space Coast Hurricanes	Rockledge, Florida
Tampa Bay Juniors	Tampa, Florida

== Champions ==
- 2012–13 Florida Junior Blades
- 2011–12 New Hampshire Jr. Monarchs
- 2010–11 New York Apple Core
- 2009–10 New Hampshire Jr. Monarchs
- 2008–09 Boston Jr. Bruins
- 2007–08 Boston Jr. Bruins
- 2006–07 Boston Jr. Bruins
