= Rochester Monarchs =

- City: Rochester, New York
- League: United States Premier Hockey League; National Collegiate Development Conference
- Founded: 2017
- Folded: 2020
- Home arena: Thomas Creek Ice Arena
- Colors: Blue and gold
- Affiliates: Rochester Monarchs (Tier III)

Franchise history
- 2017–2020: Rochester Monarchs

The Rochester Monarchs were a Tier II junior ice hockey team that last played in the United States Premier Hockey League's (USPHL) National Collegiate Development Conference (NCDC). The Monarchs played their home games at Thomas Creek Ice Arena.

== History ==
When the USPHL announced the creation of a Tier II league beginning in 2017, the Rochester Monarchs organization was the only club without an existing Tier III club to join the new league. The Monarchs were one of the worst teams during their three-year existence, bottoming out in 2020 with just 3 wins in 50 games. The situation was so bad that by early 2020, the USPHL told the franchise they would be forcibly removed from the league after the season due to poor performance. Once they were removed, all three levels of the club (NCDC, Premier and Elite Division) dissolved.

== Season-by-season records ==
| Season | GP | W | L | OTL | SOL | Pts | GF | GA | Regular season finish | Playoffs |
|---|---|---|---|---|---|---|---|---|---|---|
| 2017–18 | 50 | 14 | 30 | 6 | – | 34 | 109 | 169 | 10th of 11, USPHL | Did not qualify |
| 2018–19 | 50 | 15 | 33 | 1 | 1 | 32 | 146 | 211 | 11th of 12, USPHL | Did not qualify |
| 2019–20 | 50 | 3 | 44 | 3 | 0 | 9 | 78 | 288 | 13th of 13, USPHL | Did not qualify |
