= Northern Cyclones =

- City: Hudson, New Hampshire
- League: United States Premier Hockey League; National Collegiate Development Conference
- Conference: New England
- Division: Eastern
- Founded: 2004
- Home arena: Cyclones Arena
- Colors: Red, black, white
- Head coach: Bill Flanagan

Franchise history
- 2004–present: Northern Cyclones

The Northern Cyclones are a junior ice hockey organization competing in the United States Premier Hockey League. The team plays its home games at the Cyclones Arena, located in Hudson, New Hampshire.

The Cyclones organization also fields junior-level developmental teams in the USPHL's Premier and Elite Division (and formerly in the Metropolitan Junior Hockey League and Eastern Hockey League-Elite Division), youth hockey select teams at the Midget U18, Midget 16U, Bantam, Peewee, Squirt and other levels, and the Lady Cyclones U12, U16, and U18 teams.

The team joined the National Collegiate Development Conference ( NCDC) in the 2017–18 season. In the 2022–23 season, the Cyclones won their first regular- season division championship and finished third overall in the league, but were eliminated in the first round of the playoffs.

== Alumni ==
The Northern Cyclones have produced a number of alumni who have played at higher levels of junior hockey and in NCAA Division I and Division III college programs.

== Season-by-season records ==
Season	GP	W	L	T	OTL	Pts	GF	GA	Regular season finish	Playoffs
Atlantic Junior Hockey League
2004–05	41	17	22	0	2	36	156	193	2nd of 4, North; 4th of 8, AJHL	
2005–06	42	33	7	0	2	68	241	136	3rd of 11, AJHL	
2006–07	44	34	8	0	2	70	250	136	T-1st of 6, North; T-2nd of 12, AJHL	
2007–08	45	28	12	0	5	61	217	139	2nd of 6, North; 3rd of 11, AJHL	League champions
2008–09	42	35	6	0	1	71	206	82	1st of 6, North; 1st of 12, AJHL	League champions
2009–10	42	33	8	0	1	67	208	92	2nd of 6, North; 3rd of 12, AJHL	
2010–11	44	31	10	0	3	65	197	111	3rd of 6, North; 4th of 12, AJHL	
2011–12	44	35	6	2	1	73	203	74	2nd of 12, AJHL	
2012–13	44	30	9	3	2	65	173	102	1st of 12, AJHL	Won Quarterfinals, 2–0 vs. Philadelphia Junior Flyers; Won Semifinals, 2–0 vs. New Jersey Rockets; Lost Finals, 1–2 vs. Wilkes-Barre/Scranton Knights
Eastern Hockey League
2013–14	44	32	10	2	0	66	179	106	2nd of 5, North Div. 2nd of 17, EHL	Won Round 1, 2–0 vs. Philadelphia Revolution; Won Quarterfinals, 2–0 vs. Wilkes-Barre/Scranton Knights; Won Semifinals, 2–0 vs. Philadelphia Little Flyers; Won Finals, 3–2 vs. New Hampshire Jr. Monarchs; League champions
2014–15	44	32	8	—	4	68	178	99	2nd of 4, North Div. 4th of 19, EHL	Won Round 1, 2–0 vs. New York Apple Core; Won Quarterfinals, 2–0 vs. Wilkes-Barre/Scranton Knights; Won Semifinals, 2–0 vs. New Hampshire Jr. Monarchs; Lost Finals, 2–3 vs. Connecticut Oilers
2015–16	41	25	15	—	1	51	163	113	3rd of 9, North Conf. 8th of 18, EHL-Premier	Won First Round, 2–1 vs. Valley Jr. Warriors; Lost Second Round, 1–2 vs. New Hampshire Jr. Monarchs
2016–17	48	24	19	—	5	53	129	133	2nd of 4, New England Div. 4th of 9, North Conf. 8th of 17, EHL-Premier	Won First Round, 2–0 vs. Walpole Express; Lost Quarterfinals, 0–2 vs. New Hampshire Jr. Monarchs
United States Premier Hockey League
2017–18	50	24	21	—	5	53	165	162	6th of 11, NCDC	Lost Quarterfinals, 1–2 vs. Jersey Hitmen
2018–19	50	26	20	—	4	56	155	160	8th of 12, NCDC	Won Quarterfinals, 2–0 vs. Jersey Hitmen; Lost Semifinals, 1–2 vs. Boston Junior Bruins
2019–20	50	28	16	—	6	62	187	176	5th of 13, NCDC	Playoffs cancelled
2020–21	29	11	16	—	2	24	74	109	7th or 7, North; 13th of 13, NCDC	1–1–0 in North Div. round-robin qualifier (W, 2–0 New Hampshire Jr. Monarchs) (L, 1–3 Twin City Thunder); Lost Second Round, 0–2 vs. Twin City Thunder
2021–22	48	22	22	—	4	48	146	154	4th or 7, North; 9th of 13, NCDC	Did not qualify for post season play
2022–23	50	29	17	2	2	62	168	157	1st or 7, North; 3rd of 14, NCDC	Lost Quarterfinals, 1–2 vs. Twin City Thunder
2023–24	52	17	26	6	3	43	142	177	5th or 6, New England; 16th of 18, NCDC	Lost Playin Game, 2-6 vs. Boston Junior Bruins
2024–25	54	37	11	4	2	80	204	139	2nd or 9, New England; 4th of 22, NCDC	Won Div Semifinal, 3-1 vs. Utica Jr. Comets; Won Div Finals 3-1 South Shore Kings advance to Dineen Cup Finals (OTL, 3-4 gm Mercer Chiefs) (3-OTL, 2-3 gm South Shore Kings)
2025–26	54	32	14	4	4	72	171	142	3rd or 6, New England East; 10th of 33, NCDC	Lost Div Semifinal, 2-3 vs. Islanders Hockey Club

== USA Hockey Tier III Junior National Championships ==
Round- robin play in a pool, with the top 4 teams advancing to the semifinal.

Year	Round Robin	Record	Standing	Semifinal	Championship Game
2007	—	—	—	L, 2–9 vs. New Hampshire Jr. Monarchs (EJHL)	—
2008	W, 5–1 vs. Helena Bighorns (NorPac); W, 6–3 vs. Cleveland Jr. Lumberjacks (CSHL); W, 4–1 vs. Minnesota Ice Hawks (MnJHL)	3–0–0	1st of 4 Division II	L, 4–9 vs. New Hampshire Jr. Monarchs (EJHL)	—
2009	W, 4–1 vs. Seattle Totems (NorPac); L, 2–6 vs. Dubuque Thunderbirds (CSHL); OTL, 5–6 vs. Granite City Lumberjacks (MnJHL)	1–2–0	3rd of 4 Division II	Did not qualify	
2011	T, 2–2 vs. Chicago Hitmen (NA3HL); L, 5–6 vs. El Paso Rhinos (WSHL); W, 3–2 vs. Granite City Lumberjacks (MnJHL)	1–1–1	3rd of 4 Division II	Did not qualify	
2014	W, 4–3 vs. Springfield Pics (USPHL-Elite); W, 12–0 vs. Bellingham Blazers (NPHL); L, 2–5 vs. Flint Jr. Generals (NA3HL)	2–1–0	1st of 4 Pool B (White)	L, 1–5 vs. North Iowa Bulls (NA3HL)	—
2015*	L, 1–3 vs. North Iowa Bulls (NA3HL); W, 6–3 vs. Granite City Lumberjacks (NA3HL); W, 3–1 vs. Dells Ducks (MnJHL)	2–1–0	1st of 4 Division 1	Not played	L, 1–2 vs. North Iowa Bulls (NA3HL)

* - Although the Connecticut Oilers were EHL champions in 2015, the Cyclones were the EHL representative due to paperwork issues with Oilers' import players
