= Eastern Junior Hockey League =

American ice hockey league (1993–2013)

- Sport: Ice Hockey
- Founded: 1993
- Folded: 2013 – Disbanded with teams joining the USPHL and EHL
- CEO: Dan Esdale
- Division: Tier III
- No. of teams: 14
- Country: United States
- Last champion: New Jersey Hitmen
- Most titles: New Hampshire Jr. Monarchs (7x)

The Eastern Junior Hockey League (EJHL) was a USA Hockey-sanctioned Tier III junior ice hockey league. Founded in 1993 by Dan Esdale, the EJHL had fourteen teams from across the Northeastern United States. The EJHL champion then competed for the National Championship against the champions of the other Tier III leagues and a host city. The New Jersey Hitmen were the final EJHL Champions after the 2012–13 season.

== History ==
The league was formed in 1993 with the NECDL Classics, the Rhode Island Sharks, the Tyngsborough Huskies, the Matt O'Neil Lightning, the Granite State Stars and the Springfield Olympics. The following year the Niagara Scenics joined the league from the North American Hockey League. The Scenics later left for the Metro Junior A Hockey League in Ontario. In the subsequent years, the league has added the Bridgewater Bandits (1996); Valley Jr. Warriors (1996); NY Apple Core (1997); Capital District (1999); Bay State Breakers (1999); Junior Bruins (1999); Green Mountain Glades (2000); NJ Hitmen (2004) and the Syracuse Stars (2005 and later moved to Rochester in 2010) who joined from the Ontario Provincial Junior A Hockey League. The league has quickly been gaining prestige across the United States as teams such as the Hitmen and Monarchs compete with other top junior teams.

However, during the 2012–13 season, EJHL members the Boston Junior Bruins, Islanders Hockey Club (formerly Middlesex Islanders), New Jersey Hitmen, and the South Shore Kings announced they were forming a new league called the United States Premier Hockey League. They would eventually be followed by the Bay State Breakers and the Portland Jr. Pirates from the EJHL while adding other teams to make up the Premier Division of the USPHL. The EJHL would disband when the Boston Bandits, Connecticut Oilers, New Hampshire Junior Monarchs, New York Apple Core, Philadelphia Revolution, and the Valley Jr. Warriors joined the Atlantic Junior Hockey League which would rename itself to the Eastern Hockey League.

== Teams ==
Teams that played in the final 2012–13 season.

Northern Division
| Team | Location |
| Boston Bandits | Bridgewater, Massachusetts |
| Boston Jr. Bruins | Marlborough, Massachusetts |
| Middlesex Islanders | Tyngsborough, Massachusetts |
| New Hampshire Jr. Monarchs | Hooksett, New Hampshire |
| Portland Jr. Pirates | Saco, Maine |
| Rochester Stars | Rochester, New York |
| Valley Jr. Warriors | Haverhill, Massachusetts |
Southern Division
| Team | Location |
| Bay State Breakers | Rockland, Massachusetts |
| Connecticut Oilers | Norwalk, Connecticut |
| New Jersey Hitmen | Wayne, New Jersey |
| New York Apple Core | Long Beach, New York |
| Philadelphia Revolution | Warwick Township, Pennsylvania |
| South Shore Kings | Foxborough, Massachusetts |
| Springfield Pics | West Springfield, Massachusetts |

== Champions ==
The winning team in the EJHL was awarded the Gary Dineen Cup, named for Gary Dineen, one of the founders of the New England Junior Hockey League (1973–1989, an indirect predecessor of the EJHL), and of the EJHL New England Junior Falcons.

- 1994 NECDL Classics
- 1995 Niagara Scenics
- 1996 NE Jr. Whalers
- 1997 NE Jr. Whalers
- 1998 NE Jr. Coyotes
- 1999 Walpole Stars
- 2000 NE Jr. Coyotes
- 2001 Walpole Stars
- 2002 NH Jr. Monarchs
- 2003 NY Apple Core
- 2004 NH Jr. Monarchs
- 2005 Junior Bruins
- 2006 NH Jr. Monarchs
- 2007 NH Jr. Monarchs
- 2008 NJ Hitmen
- 2009 NJ Hitmen
- 2010 NH Jr. Monarchs
- 2011 NH Jr. Monarchs
- 2012 NH Jr. Monarchs
- 2013 NJ Hitmen

== Timeline of teams ==
- Matt O'Neil Lightning (1993–98), became Boston Harbor Wolves became Boston Jr. Shamrocks, became the Philadelphia Revolution
- Tyngsboro Huskies (1993–2001), became Lowell Jr. Lock Monsters (2001–2004), became New England Jr. Huskies
- Springfield Olympics (Pics) became New England Jr. Whalers became New England Jr. Coyotes became New England Jr. Falcons
- New England College Development League (NECDL) Classics (1993–1997), became Walpole Stars (1997–2006), became Foxboro Stars (2006–2007), became South Shore Kings (2007–present)
- Niagara Scenic (1994–1995)
- Rhode Island Sharks (1993–1998) folded after the 1997-1998 season
- Granite State Stars (1993–1996), became Great Northern Snow Devils (1996–1999) became Exeter Snow Devils (1999–2001), became New Hampshire Jr. Monarchs
- Green Mountain Glades (2000–2012), became the Portland Jr. Pirates
- New England Junior Huskies (1995–2012), became the Middlesex Islanders
- Capital District Selects (1996–2012), became the Connecticut Oilers
- Syracuse Stars (2005–2009), moved to Rochester to become the Rochester Stars (2010–2013) and Rochester Jr. Americans (2013–2016)
