= New Hampshire Junior Monarchs =

- City: Hooksett, New Hampshire
- League: USPHL
- Founded: 1993
- Home arena: Tri-Town Ice Arena
- Colors: Purple, black, gold, white
- General manager: Clint Edinger
- Head coach: Tony Dalessio
- Media: New Hampshire Union Leader

Franchise history
- 1993–1995: Granite State Stars
- 1995–1999: Great Northern Snow Devils
- 1999–2001: Exeter Snow Devils
- 2001–2023: New Hampshire Jr. Monarchs

The New Hampshire Junior Monarchs were a junior and youth ice hockey organization from Hooksett, New Hampshire, with teams in the United States Premier Hockey League (USPHL). Its highest level junior team played in the USPHL's National Collegiate Development Conference (NCDC).

== History ==
The franchise was a charter member of the Eastern Junior Hockey League (EJHL) in 1993. For the first two seasons, they were known as the Granite State Stars located in Dover, New Hampshire, then they moved to Biddeford, Maine and were known as the Great Northern Snow Devils. In 1999 they moved to Exeter, New Hampshire, and were known as the Exeter Snow Devils, before moving to Hooksett in 2001 and becoming the Junior Monarchs.

In 2013, Tier III junior hockey leagues underwent a large reorganization, which included the Monarchs joining the Atlantic Junior Hockey League (AtJHL). The Atlantic Junior Hockey League then re-branded itself as the Eastern Hockey League (EHL).

In December 2016, it was announced that the Monarchs were leaving the EHL for the United States Premier Hockey League (USPHL) beginning in the 2017–18 season and transferring their teams to the corresponding Premier, Elite, U18, and U16 divisions. The Jr. Monarchs then added a tuition-free team in the National Collegiate Development Conference (NCDC) of the USPHL beginning in 2018.

In 2023, a group of local investors purchased the Tri-Town Ice Arena and founded a new hockey organization based in the arena called the New Hampshire Mountain Kings, which displaced the Jr. Monarchs. The new organization joined the Tier II North American Hockey League and Tier III North American 3 Hockey League.

Monarchs subsequently ceased operations.

== Coach ==
Sean Tremblay was the general manager and head coach of the New Hampshire Junior Monarchs from 2001 to 2012. He was named EJHL's Coach of the Year in 1997, 2002, and 2006, as well as Junior Coach of the Year by Hockey Night in Boston in 2002, 2004, and 2006. In August 2006, he assisted the USA Under-17 Select Team to a gold medal in the Three Nations Tournament. In 2012, he left to become the head coach of the Islanders Hockey Club.

Tremblay was then replaced by Ryan Frew, head coach of the Monarchs' Junior B team in the Empire Junior Hockey League. Frew eventually led the team into the Eastern Hockey League and won a league championship in 2016. He was named NCDC Coach of the Year in 2019.

Frew died from peritonitis on October 5, 2020.

== Season-by-season records ==
Season	GP	W	L	T	OTL	Pts	GF	GA	Regular season finish	Playoffs
Granite State Stars
1993–94	No information									
1994–95	No information									
Great Northern Snow Devils
1995–96	No information									
1996–97	No information									
1997–98	37	22	14	1	—	45	168	136	3rd of 8, EJHL	No information
1998–99	37	18	16	3	—	39	151	127	4th of 8, EJHL	No information
Exeter Snow Devils
1999–00	40	25	9	6	—	56	194	136	2nd of 11, EJHL	No information
2000–01	No information								5th EJHL	Lost Quarterfinal game, 4–5 vs. New England Jr. Coyotes
New Hampshire Junior Monarchs
2001–02	38	35	2	1	0	71	214	70	1st of 6, North; 1st of 12, EJHL	Won Quarterfinal game, 8–1 vs. Capital District Selects; Won Semifinal game, 4-1 vs. Walpole Stars; Won Championship game, 2–1 vs. New York Apple Core; League champions
2002–03	38	25	7	6	0	57	179	101	2nd of 6, North; 4th of 12, EJHL	Lost Quarterfinals, 1–2 vs. New England Jr. Coyotes
2003–04	38	31	4	2	1	65	197	89	2nd of 6, North; 2nd of 12, EJHL	Won Quarterfinals vs. New York Apple Core; Won Semifinal game, 6–5 vs. Capital District Selects; Won Championship game, 6–3 vs. Boston Jr. Bruins; League champions
2004–05	52	36	9	5	2	79	217	139	2nd of 6, North; 2nd of 13, EJHL	Won Quarterfinals, 2–0 vs. Capital District Selects; Won Semifinal game, 7–3 vs. Valley Jr. Warriors; Lost Championship game vs. Boston Junior Bruins
2005–06	45	38	4	3	0	79	227	107	1st of 7, North; 1st of 14, EJHL	Won Quarterfinals, 2–0 vs. Bay State Breakers; Won Semifinal game, 4–3 (OT) vs. Walpole Stars; Won Championship game, 6–5 (OT) vs. Boston Junior Bruins; League champions
2006–07	45	38	5	1	1	78	223	116	1st of 7, North; 1st of 14, EJHL	Won Quarterfinals, 2–0 vs. Foxboro Stars; Won Semifinals, 1–0–1 vs. New England Junior Huskies; Won Finals, 2–0 vs. Bay State Breakers; League champions
2007–08	45	32	9	2	2	68	187	97	1st of 7, North; 1st of 14, EJHL	Won Quarterfinals, 1–1 vs. Bay State Breakers; Won Semifinals, 1–1 vs. Boston Jr. Bruins; Lost Finals, 0–2 vs. New Jersey Hitmen
2008–09	45	35	5	4	1	75	219	119	1st of 7, North; 1st of 14, EJHL	Won Quarterfinals, 1–1 vs. South Shore Kings; Won Semifinals, 2–0 vs. Bay State Breakers; Lost Finals, 1–2 vs. New Jersey Hitmen
2009–10	45	36	5	4	0	76	244	108	1st of 7, North; 1st of 14, EJHL	Won Quarterfinals, 2–0 vs. New York Apple Core; Won Semifinals, 1–0 vs. Boston Junior Bruins; Won Finals, 1–0 vs. South Shore Kings; League champions
2010–11	45	38	4	2	1	79	233	96	1st of 7, North; 2nd of 14, EJHL	Won Quarterfinals, 2–0 vs. Valley Jr. Warriors; Won Semifinals, 2–0 vs. Boston Junior Bruins; Won Finals, 2–0 vs. New Jersey Hitmen; League champions
2011–12	45	30	14	—	1	61	194	117	2nd of 7, North; 3rd of 14, EJHL	Won Quarterfinals, 2–0 vs. Bay State Breakers; Won Semifinals, 2–1 vs. South Shore Kings; Won Finals, 2–0 vs. New Jersey Hitmen; League champions
2012–13	45	23	20	—	2	48	141	158	5th of 7, North; 9th of 14, EJHL	Won First Round vs. Springfield Pics; Lost Quarterfinals vs. New Jersey Hitmen
Eastern Hockey League
2013–14	44	35	8	1	0	71	182	89	1st of 5, North; 2nd of 17, EHL	Won First Round, 2–0 vs. New Jersey Titans; Won Quarterfinals, 2–0 vs. Valley Jr. Warriors; Won Semifinals, 2–1 vs. Boston Bandits; Lost Finals, 2–3 vs. Northern Cyclones
2014–15	44	34	7	1	2	71	159	89	1st of 5, North; 2nd of 19, EHL	Won First Round, 2–0 vs. New Jersey Rockets; Won Quarterfinals, 2–1 vs. New York Bobcats; Lost Semifinals, 0–2 vs. Northern Cyclones
2015–16	41	28	7	—	6	62	179	109	2nd of 9, North Conf. 3rd of 18, EHL-Premier	Won First Round, 2–0 vs. Vermont Lumberjacks; Won Second Round, 2–1 vs. Northern Cyclones; Won Semifinals, 2–0 vs. Connecticut Oilers; Won Finals, 3–0 vs. Philadelphia Little Flyers; League champions
2016–17	48	33	11	—	4	70	171	114	1st of 4, New England Div. 1st of 9, North Conf. 3rd of 17, EHL-Premier	Won First Round, 2–0 vs. Boston Bandits; Won Quarterfinals, 2–0 vs. Northern Cyclones; Lost Semifinals, 0–2 vs. Philadelphia Junior Flyers
United States Premier Hockey League
2017–18	44	35	8	—	1	71	218	100	1st of 9, North Div. 4th of 44, USPHL-Premier	Won First Round, 2–0 vs. Rochester Monarchs; Lost Quarterfinals, 1–2 vs. Northern Cyclones-Premier
2018–19	50	27	18	—	5	59	157	147	5th of 12, NCDC	Lost Quarterfinals, 0–2 vs. Islanders Hockey Club
2019–20	50	24	20	—	6	54	154	144	9th of 13, NCDC	Playoffs cancelled
2020–21	34	18	14	—	2	38	111	118	3rd of 7, North; 6th of 13, NCDC	0–2–0 in North Div. round-robin qualifier (L, 0–2 vs. Northern Cyclones; L, 2–3 vs. Twin City Thunder)
2021–22	48	29	14	—	5	63	142	132	1st of 7, North Div. 3rd of 13, NCDC	Won Div. Semifinal, 2–0 vs. South Shore Kings; Lost Div. Finals, 1–3 vs. Boston Junior Bruins
2022–23	50	25	17	—	8	58	140	139	4th of 7, North Div. 6th of 14, NCDC	Lost Div. Semifinal, 1–2 vs. South Shore Kings

== USA Hockey Tier III Junior A National Championships ==
Round robin play in pool with top 4 teams advancing to semi-final.

Year	Round Robin	Record	Standing	Semifinal	Championship Game
2007*	—	—	—	W, Northern Cyclones (AtJHL) 9-2	W, Bay State Breakers 5-1; National champions
2008	W, El Paso Rhinos (WSHL) 11-4; W, Dubuque Thunderbirds (CSHL) 3-2; W, Minnesota Owls (MnJHL) 8-1	3-0-0	1st of 4 Div. III	W, Northern Cyclones (AtJHL) 9-4	W, Jersey Hitmen (EJHL) 5-2; National champions
2009	W, El Paso Rhinos (WSHL) 7-2; W, New York Bobcats (AtJHL) 6-2; W, Helena Bighorns (NorPac) 6-3	3-0-0	1st of 4 Div. I	W, Granite City Lumberjacks (MnJHL) 4-2	W, Jersey Hitmen (EJHL) 3-2; National champions
2010	W, Boulder Bison (WSHL) 10-0; W, Dubuque Thunderbirds (CSHL) 3-2; T, Helena Bighorns (NorPac) 3-3	2-0-1	1st of 4 Div. I	L, St. Louis Jr. Blues (CSHL) 1-2	—
2011	The EJHL did not send representatives to this tournament				
2012	OTW, Atlanta Junior Knights (EJHL South) 2-1; W, Philadelphia Revolution (EJHL) 9-3; W, Mass Maple Leafs (ESHL) 9-1	3-0-0	1st of 4 American Div. II	W, Florida Jr. Blades (EmJHL) 6-1	W, Mass Maple Leafs (ESHL) 4-1; National champions
2014**	L, Boston Jr. Bruins (USPHL-Premier) 3-5; W, Marquette Royales (MnJHL) 7-2; W, Helena Bighorns (AWHL) 5-3	2-1-0	2nd of 4 Red Pool	Did not qualify	
2016	Tier III Nationals not held in 2016				

* - unverified scores
** - Monarchs win one game playoff with the Boston Junior Rangers (MetJHL) and named "HOST"

== Notable alumni ==
The Jr. Monarchs have produced a number of alumni playing in higher levels of junior hockey, NCAA Division I, Division III, and ACHA college programs including several National Hockey League draft picks.

- Greg Burke, 2006–2008: Washington Capitals, 2008, 6th round, 174th overall
- John Doherty, 2002–03: Toronto Maple Leafs, 2003, 2nd round, 57th overall
- Matt Duffy, 2003–2005: Florida Panthers, 2005, 4th round, 104th overall
- Brian Dumoulin, 2008–09: Carolina Hurricanes, 2009, 2nd round, 51st overall
- Brian Foster, 2003–2005: Florida Panthers, 2005, 5th round, 161st overall
- John Laliberte, 2001–02: Vancouver Canucks, 2002, 4th round, 114th overall
- Joe Pearce, 2001–02: Tampa Bay Lightning, 2002, 5th round, 135th overall
- Jonathan Rheault, 2003–04: Philadelphia Flyers, 2006, 5th round, 145th overall
- Andrew Thomas, 2001–2003: Washington Capitals, 2005, 4th round, 109th overall
