= Islanders Hockey Club =

- City: Tyngsborough, Massachusetts
- League: USPHL
- Conference: New England
- Division: Eastern
- Founded: 2017
- Home arena: Skate 3
- Colors: Navy, orange and white
- Head coach: Tim Kyrkostas
- Affiliates: Islanders Hockey Club (Tier III)

Franchise history
- 2017–present: Islanders Hockey Club

Championships
- Regular season titles: 1 (2018)
- Division titles: 1 (2024)
- Playoff championships: 1 (2018)

The Islanders Hockey Club are an American Tier II junior ice hockey organization from Tyngsborough, Massachusetts. The Islanders are members of the United States Premier Hockey League's National Collegiate Development Conference.

== History ==
In October of 2016, the USPHL announced that they had applied to USA Hockey for approval to add a Tier II junior league beginning with the 2017–18 season. Two months later, the petition was denied. Instead of ending their plans, the USPHL withdrew from USA Hockey oversight and organized the National Collegiate Development Conference. The Islanders Hockey Club took advantage of the league by founding a new Tier II franchise and joining for the inaugural season.

== Season-by-season records ==
Season	GP	W	L	OTL	SOL	Pts	GF	GA	Regular season finish	Playoffs
2017–18	50	47	3	0	—	94	254	107	1st of 11, NCDC	Won Quarterfinal series, 2–0 (Boston Bandits); Won Semifinal series, 2–0 (Connecticut Jr. Rangers); Won Championship series, 2–1 (New Jersey Hitmen)
2018–19	50	27	18	2	3	59	176	152	4th of 12, NCDC	Won Quarterfinal series, 2–0 (New Hampshire Jr. Monarchs); Lost Semifinal series, 0–2 (Connecticut Jr. Rangers)
2019–20	50	29	17	3	1	62	187	144	4th of 13, NCDC	Playoffs cancelled
2020–21	43	16	23	4	0	36	127	169	4th of 7, North Div. 8th of 13, NCDC	Won Div. Quarterfinal series, 2–1 (South Shore Kings); Lost Div. Semifinal series, 0–2 (Boston Junior Bruins)
2021–22	48	14	31	1	2	31	133	186	7th of 7, North Div. 13th of 13, NCDC	Did not qualify
2022–23	50	17	29	1	3	38	134	176	7th of 7, North Div. 14th of 14, NCDC	Did not qualify
2023–24	52	36	11	4	1	77	173	122	1st of 6, New England Div. 2nd of 18, NCDC	Won Div. Semifinal series, 2–0 (Boston Junior Bruins); Lost Div. Final series, 0–3 (South Shore Kings)
2024–25	54	30	21	3	0	63	172	169	4th of 9, New England Div. 10th of 22, NCDC	Lost Play-In series, 1–2 (Worcester Jr. Railers)
2025–26	54	39	11	2	2	82	200	123	2nd of 6, New England East; 5th of 33, NCDC	Won Div Semifinal 3–2 (Northern Cyclones); Lost Div Finals 0-3 (South Shore Kings)

== Junior B team ==
The Islanders also field teams in the USPHL Premier and Elite Divisions (equivalent to the former Tier III Junior B designation). The former Junior B team competed in the Eastern Conference of the Empire Junior Hockey League (EmJHL) prior to its joining the USPHL as the Empire Division (later USP3 Division and then Elite Division).
