= South Shore Kings =

- City: Foxboro, Massachusetts
- League: USPHL
- Conference: New England
- Division: Eastern
- Founded: 1993
- Home arena: Foxboro Sports Center
- Colors: Green, black, white and gold
- Head coach: Tyler Holske/Drew Omicioli

Franchise history
- 1993–1997: NECDL Classics
- 1997–2006: Walpole Stars
- 2006–2007: Foxboro Stars
- 2007–present: South Shore Kings

The South Shore Kings are a Tier II Junior A ice hockey team playing in the United States Premier Hockey League (USPHL). The team plays at the Foxboro Sports Center located in Foxboro, Massachusetts.

The organization fields Tier II and Tier III teams in the National Collegiate Developmental Conference USPHL Premier and Elite Divisions. The Kings also offer youth hockey select teams at the Bantam, Peewee, and Squirt and other various levels.

== History ==
The franchise, then known as the NECDL Classics, is a charter member of the Eastern Junior Hockey League (EJHL) since 1993. In 1997 the Classics became the Walpole Stars, remaining as such until 2006, when it changed its name to the Foxboro Stars. One year later the team aligned itself with the South Shore Kings organization (which had fielded midget team), becoming known as the South Shore Kings.

The USPHL was formed for the 2013–14 season during a Tier III reorganization that led to the dissolution of the EJHL. Prior to that season, the Kings participated in the former Junior A Eastern Junior Hockey League (EJHL), the former Junior B Empire Junior Hockey League (EmJHL) and Continental Hockey Association (later named Eastern States Hockey League or ESHL). The former EJHL team now plays in the USPHL Premier Divisions, the former ESHL team plays in the Elite Division, and the former EmJHL team played in the Empire Division from 2012 to 2015.

The 2023-24 season marked the first Dineen Cup (USPHL NCDC playoff championship) and the next year their first regular season divisional and league championship. The team also captured the 2025-26 Dinnen Cup in Idaho Falls,ID at the Mountain America Center

== Season-by-season records ==
Season	GP	W	L	T	OTL	Pts	GF	GA	Regular season finish	Playoffs
NECDL Classics
1993–97	no data								EJHL	
Walpole Stars
1997–98	no data								EJHL	
1998–99	37	28	8	1	—	57	214	126	1st of 8, EJHL	
1999–00	40	31	8	1	—	63	216	104	1st of 11, EJHL	
2000–01	37	31	2	3	1	66	—	—	1st of 12, EJHL	Won Quarterfinal game, 6–2 vs. Lowell Jr. Lock Monsters; Won Semifinal game, 4–3 vs. Valley Jr. Warriors; Won Championship game, 5-3 vs. Boston Jr. Bruins; League champions
2001–02	38	21	12	4	1	47	160	150	3rd of 6, South; 5th of 12, EJHL	Won Quarterfinal game, 5–2 vs. Boston Jr. Bruins; Lost Semifinal game, 1–4 vs. New Hampshire Jr. Monarchs
2002–03	38	28	5	3	2	61	199	126	2nd of 6, South; 2nd of 12, EJHL	Won Quarterfinals vs. Lowell Jr. Lock Monsters; Won Semifinal game, 5-2 vs. Boston Jr. Bruins; Lost Championship game, 4-5 vs. New York Apple Core
2003–04	38	18	18	1	1	38	127	118	4th of 6, South; 7th of 12, EJHL	Lost Quarterfinals vs. Boston Jr. Bruins
2004–05	52	26	22	3	1	56	170	169	2nd of 7, South; 5th of 13, EJHL	Won Quarterfinals, 2–0 vs. Bay State Breakers; Lost Semifinal game, 0–2 vs. Boston Jr. Bruins
2005–06	45	23	18	2	2	50	165	152	2nd of 7, South; 6th of 14, EJHL	Won Quarterfinals, 1–1 vs. Green Mountain Glades; Lost Semifinal game, 3–4 OT vs. New Hampshire Jr. Monarchs
Foxboro Stars
2006–07	45	16	21	6	2	40	136	162	4th of 7, South; 9th of 14, EJHL	Lost Quarterfinals, 0–2 vs. New Hampshire Jr. Monarchs
South Shore Kings
2007–08	45	24	16	3	2	53	170	155	3rd of 7, South; 6th of 14, EJHL	Won Quarterfinals, 1–1 vs. Syracuse Stars; Lost Semifinals, 0–2 vs. Jersey Hitmen
2008–09	45	21	17	5	2	49	159	160	4th of 7, South; 7th of 14, EJHL	Lost Quarterfinals, 1–1 vs. New Hampshire Jr. Monarchs
2009–10	45	33	5	2	2	73	188	115	1st of 7, South; 2nd of 14, EJHL	Won Quarterfinals, 2–0 vs. Green Mountain Glades; Won Semifinal game, 3–2 vs. Jersey Hitmen; Lost Championship game, 3–4 vs. New Hampshire Jr. Monarchs
2010–11	45	25	13	5	2	57	206	156	3rd of 7, South; 5th of 14, EJHL	Won First Round, 2–0 vs. Green Mountain Glades; Lost Quarterfinals, 1–2 vs. Bay State Breakers
2011–12	45	37	8	—	0	74	221	132	1st of 7, South; 2nd of 14, EJHL	Won Quarterfinals, 2–1 vs. Green Mountain Glades; Lost Semifinals, 1–2 vs. New Hampshire Jr. Monarchs
2012–13	45	25	16	—	4	54	174	143	2nd of 7, South; 5th of 14, EJHL	Lost Quarterfinals vs. Valley Jr. Warriors
2013–14	48	31	13	—	4	66	166	139	3rd of 9, USPHL Premier	Won Quarterfinals, 2–1 vs. P.A.L. Jr. Islanders; Lost Semifinals, 2–0 vs. Jersey Hitmen
2014–15	50	23	24	—	3	49	166	163	7th of 11, USPHL Premier	Won Quarterfinals, 2–1 vs. Boston Junior Bruins; Lost Semifinals, 2–0 vs. Jersey Hitmen
2015–16	44	31	8	—	5	67	172	109	4th of 12, USPHL Premier	Won Quarterfinals, 2–0 vs. P.A.L. Jr. Islanders; Lost Semifinals, 0–2 vs. Islanders Hockey Club
2016–17	45	20	22	—	3	43	144	148	6th of 10, USPHL Premier	Lost Quarterfinals, 0–2 vs. Boston Junior Bruins
2017–18	50	29	16	—	5	63	175	165	4th of 11, NCDC	Lost Quarterfinals, 1–2 vs. Connecticut Jr. Rangers
2018–19	50	14	34	—	2	30	120	221	12th of 12, NCDC	Did not qualify
2019–20	50	17	27	—	6	40	145	191	11th of 13, NCDC	Did not qualify
2018–19	50	14	34	—	2	30	120	221	12th of 12, NCDC	Did not qualify
2020–21	39	22	16	—	1	45	116	123	2nd of 7, North; 5th of 13, NCDC	Lost First Round, 1–2 vs. Islanders Hockey Club
2021–22	48	25	19	—	4	54	154	139	3rd of 7, North; 5th of 13, NCDC	Lost Div. Semifinals, 0–2 vs. New Hampshire Jr. Monarchs
2022–23	50	28	17	4	1	61	159	142	2nd of 7, North; 4th of 14, NCDC	Won Div. Semifinals, 2-1 vs. New Hampshire Jr. Monarchs; Won North Div 2-1 Twin City Thunder; Lost League Finals 1-2 P.A.L. Jr. Islanders
2023–24	52	36	12	2	2	76	192	123	2nd of 6, New England; 4th of 18, NCDC	Won Div. Semifinals, 2-0 vs. Utica Jr. Comets; Won Div Finals 3-0 Islanders Hockey Club; Won ATL/NE Reg 3-1 P.A.L. Jr. Islanders; Won Dineen Cup 2-1 (Ogden Mustangs)
2024–25	54	44	7	3	0	91	235	127	1st of 9, New England; 1st of 22, NCDC	Won Div. Semifinals, 3-0 (Worcester Jr. Railers); Lost Div. Finals 1-3 (Northern Cyclones) adv to Dineen Cup top Div loser (OTL, 0-1 gm Idaho Falls Spud Kings)(3-OTW, 3-2 Northern Cyclones)(W, 4-0 Mercer Chiefs) (Lost FINAL, 1-2 (Idaho Falls Spud Kings)
2025–26	54	44	7	1	2	91	220	108	1st of 6, New England (East); 1st of 19, New England; 1st of 33, NCDC	Won Div. Semifinals, 3-0 (Thunder Hockey Club); Won Div. Finals 3-0 (Islanders Hockey Club); Won NE Round Robin gm1 1-0 (Lewiston MAINEiacs); Won NE Finals 2-0 (Utica Jr. Comets) (L, 5-4 gm 1 Idaho Falls Spud Kings)(W, 3-2 P.A.L. Jr. Islanders)(W, 1-0 Idaho Falls Spud Kings) (W gm1 FINAL, 3-1 Grand Junction River Hawks)(OTW gm2 FINAL, 1-0 Grand Junction River Hawks); Won Dineen Cup, Double Elimination Format

== USA Hockey Tier III Junior A National Championships ==
Round robin play in pool with top 4 teams advancing to semi-final.

Year	Round Robin	Record	Standing	Semifinal	Championship Game
2010	W, Phoenix Polar Bears (WSHL) 7-1; W, Walpole Express (AtJHL) 9-2; W, Twin Cities Northern Lights (MnJHL) 7-1	3-0-0	1st of 4 Div. II	W, Rochester Ice Hawks (MnJHL) 6-1	L, St. Louis Jr. Blues (CSHL) 3-4

== Alumni ==
- Noel Acciari – Pittsburgh Penguins (NHL)
- Charlie Coyle – Drafted in 2010 by San Jose Sharks (NHL), traded to and debuted with the Minnesota Wild in 2012. Subsequently traded to Boston becoming a dependable top 9 forward for the Bruins.
- Matty Beniers - Seattle Kraken (NHL)
- Jimmy Hayes (ice hockey) - Boston Bruins (NHL)
- John Marino - Utah Mammoth (NHL)
- Jim Fahey – San Jose Sharks (NHL) and New Jersey Devils (NHL), 2003 First Team All-American with Northeastern University
- Matt Gilroy – New York Rangers (NHL), 2009 Hobey Baker Award Winner, 2008 and 2009 First Team All-American, 2007 Second Team All-American with Boston University
- Gianni Paolo – Actor most known for portraying Brayden Weston on the hit crime drama Power, and Power Book II: Ghost; Also known for MA, The Fosters, The Mick and Chance (TV series)
- Jordan Smotherman – Atlanta Thrashers (NHL)
- Chris Wagner – Colorado Avalanche (NHL)
- Ryan Donato – Chicago Blackhawks (NHL)
- Jimmy Vesey - New York Rangers, Buffalo Sabres, Toronto Maple Leafs, New Jersey Devils, Colorado Avalanche (NHL), Geneve Servette (Swiss League)
