= Boston Junior Bruins =

- City: Marlborough, Massachusetts
- League: United States Premier Hockey League (USPHL); National Collegiate Development Conference (NCDC)
- Conference: New England
- Division: Central
- Founded: 1991
- Home arena: New England Sports Center
- Colors: Black, gold and white
- General manager: Peter Masters
- Head coach: Peter Masters (Premier)

Franchise history
- Original Club
- 1991–2024: Boston Junior Bruins
- 2024–present: West Chester Wolves
- Current Club
- 2013–present: Boston Junior Bruins

The Boston Junior Bruins are an American junior ice hockey organization playing in Marlborough, Massachusetts. They currently field three junior and a number of youth teams in the United States Premier Hockey League (USPHL).

== History ==
The Boston Junior Bruins were founded in 1991 as an independent junior team. The Junior Bruins played prep schools and local junior teams, and competed in major tournaments throughout North America before joining the Tier III Junior A Eastern Junior Hockey League (EJHL) in 1999.

During their first three EJHL seasons, Head Coach Peter Masters and his staff led the team to fourth, third, and second-place finishes overall in the twelve-team league. In 2000–01 the team finished the regular season with a 45-15-1 overall record as the EJHL Northern Division Champions.

To better develop talent for their Junior A program, the Junior Bruins fielded a number of youth hockey teams as well as two Tier III Junior B teams in the Empire Junior Hockey League (EmJHL) and Continental Hockey Association (renamed to Eastern States Hockey League in 2011) (CHA/ESHL).

During the 2012–13 season, Junior Bruins and other EJHL teams announced the formation of a new league called the United States Premier Hockey League (USPHL). The new league would go on to absorb the former EmJHL and the recently announced Eastern Elite Hockey League (a new league consisting mostly of the former EJHL South) to create several junior and youth divisions within the USPHL. The former Junior A team would play in the USPHL Premier Division and its former Junior B team would play in the USPHL Empire Division (later named USP3). The Junior Bruins would also field a team in the USPHL Elite Division.

In 2017, the leagues underwent another realignment and the USPHL added the National Collegiate Development Conference (NCDC) as their top division. The NCDC was intended to become a Tier II league but was denied sanctioning by USA Hockey. The USPHL went forward without sanctioning for its junior leagues in the 2017–18 season and all of the Bruins' team were promoted the NCDC, Premier and Elite Divisions from the Premier, Elite and USP3 Divisions respectively.

In April 2024, the Junior Bruins sold their Tier II club to the West Chester Wolves, who had been approved as an expansion franchise about a week earlier. The remainder of the organization's programs continued and, one year later, the Premier Division (Tier III) club was promoted to Tier II status and joined the National Collegiate Development Conference.

== Team members and regular season ==
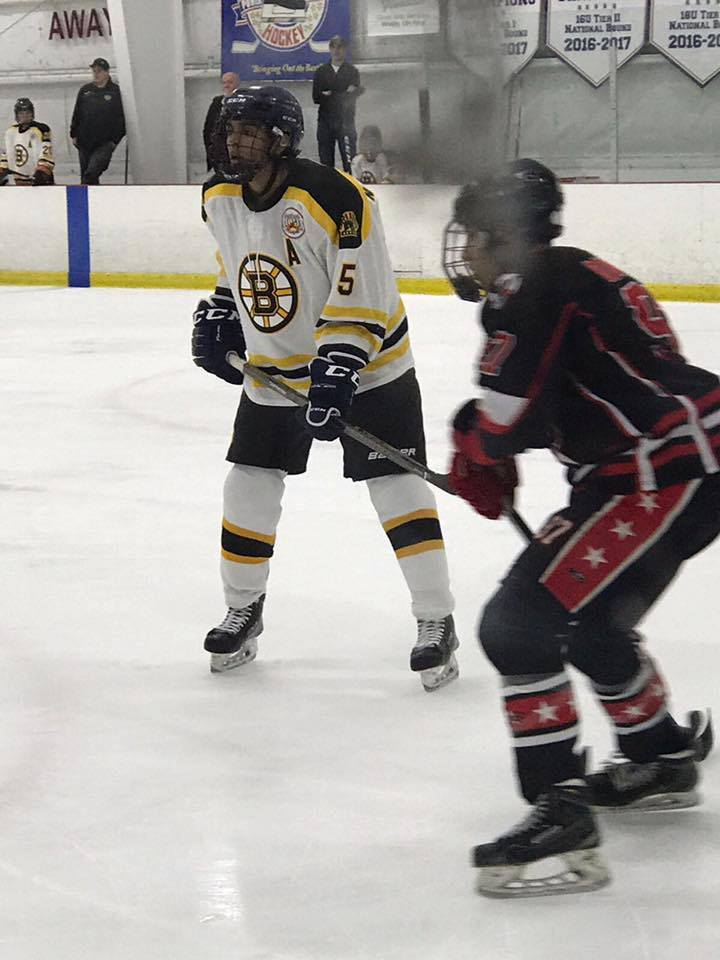
Velan Nandhakumaran plays for Boston Junior Bruins

The Junior Bruins hold tryouts in April and final camp in late July. The Junior Bruins team is typically composed of 12 to 13 forwards, 6 to 7 defensemen, and 2 goalies on the active roster. All players are between the ages of 16 and 20. The season starts the day after Labor Day and playoffs finish during the third week of March each year. The team typically practices 3 to 4 times per week.

The schedule includes 45 EJHL regular season schedule games plus three rounds of playoffs. From year to year the Junior Bruins normally play one or both of the US National teams (USA Hockey's National Team Development Program) in an exhibition game along with some scrimmages versus local prep schools and participate in 4-6 major recruiting showcase/tournaments.

The Bruins sold their NCDC franchise to the West Chester Wolves prior to the 2024-25 season. The following season, 2025-26 the Boston Junior Bruins re-instated their NCDC franchise.

== Charitable involvement ==
The Bay State Hockey Foundation (BSHF) is the non-profit arm of the Junior Bruins Organization. Founded in 2005, the mission of the BSHF is to provide " ... children and young adults with lower extremity paralysis and other disabilities the opportunity to participate in the sport of sled ice hockey ... " Equipment and participation are free for qualified individuals.

== Season-by-season records ==
=== Original primary club ===
| Season | GP | W | L | T | OTL | GF | GA | Pts | Regular season finish | Playoffs |
|---|---|---|---|---|---|---|---|---|---|---|
Eastern Junior Hockey League
| 1999–2000 | 40 | 22 | 18 | 0 | — | 175 | 157 | 44 | 5th EJHL | |
| 2000–01 | 38 | 30 | 7 | 0 | 1 | — | — | 61 | 2nd EJHL | Won Quarterfinal game, 4–2 vs. Capital District Selects; Won Semifinal game, 5–3 vs. New England Jr. Coyotes; Lost Championship game, 3–5 vs. Walpole Stars |
| 2001–02 | 38 | 26 | 11 | 0 | 1 | 173 | 103 | 53 | 3rd EJHL | Lost Quarterfinal game, 2–5 vs. Walpole Stars |
| 2002–03 | 38 | 28 | 6 | 4 | 0 | 180 | 90 | 60 | 1st EJHL North | Won Quarterfinals vs. Capital District Selects; Lost Semifinal game, 2–5 vs. Walpole Stars |
| 2003–04 | 38 | 32 | 3 | 2 | 0 | 180 | 73 | 66 | 1st EJHL North | Won Quarterfinals vs. Walpole Stars; Won Semifinal game, 3–2 vs. New England Jr. Coyotes; Lost Championship game, 3–6 vs. New Hampshire Jr. Monarchs |
| 2004–05 | 51 | 36 | 8 | 6 | 1 | 200 | 102 | 79 | 1st EJHL North | Won Quarterfinals, 1–0–1 vs. New England Jr. Falcons; Won Semifinal game, 2–0 vs. Walpole Stars; Won Championship game vs. New Hampshire Junior Monarchs; League champions |
| 2005–06 | 45 | 34 | 8 | 1 | 2 | 177 | 111 | 71 | 2nd EJHL North | Won Quarterfinals, 2–0 vs. Bridgewater Bandits; Won Semifinal game, 3–1 vs. New England Jr. Falcons; Lost Championship game, 5–6 OT vs. New Hampshire Jr. Monarchs |
| 2006–07 | 45 | 30 | 11 | 3 | 1 | 170 | 116 | 64 | 2nd EJHL North | Won Quarterfinals vs. New York Apple Core; Lost Semifinals vs. Bay State Breakers |
| 2007–08 | 45 | 29 | 10 | 5 | 1 | 162 | 102 | 64 | 3rd EJHL North | Won Quarterfinals vs. Bridgewater Bandits; Lost Semifinals vs. New Hampshire Junior Monarchs |
| 2008–09 | 45 | 32 | 9 | 3 | 1 | 183 | 101 | 68 | 2nd EJHL North | Lost Quarterfinals vs. Bay State Breakers |
| 2009–10 | 45 | 30 | 11 | 5 | 0 | 166 | 109 | 64 | 2nd North; 4th EJHL | Won Quarterfinals, 2–0 vs. Bay State Breakers; Lost Semifinals, vs. New Hampshire Junior Monarchs |
| 2010–11 | 45 | 38 | 6 | 1 | 0 | 215 | 118 | 79 | 2nd North; 3rd EJHL | Won Quarterfinals, 2–1 vs. Springfield Pics; Lost Semifinals, 0–2 vs. New Hampshire Junior Monarchs |
| 2011–12 | 45 | 37 | 7 | — | 1 | 239 | 135 | 75 | 1st EJHL | Won Quarterfinals, 2–0 vs. New England Jr. Huskies; Lost Semifinals, 0–2 vs. Jersey Hitmen |
| 2012–13 | 45 | 32 | 10 | — | 3 | 155 | 113 | 67 | 1st North; 2nd EJHL | Lost Quarterfinals, 0–2 vs. Bay State Breakers |
United States Premier Hockey League
| 2013–14 | 48 | 36 | 8 | — | 4 | 184 | 103 | 75 | 1st of 9, USPHL-Premier | Won Quarterfinals, 2–0 vs. Portland Jr. Pirates; Won Semifinals, 2–0 vs. Islanders Hockey Club; Won Finals, 2–0 vs. Jersey Hitmen; League champions |
| 2014–15 | 48 | 38 | 8 | — | 4 | 207 | 122 | 80 | 2nd of 11, USPHL-Premier | Lost Quarterfinals, 1–2 vs. South Shore Kings |
| 2015–16 | 44 | 33 | 9 | — | 2 | 195 | 104 | 68 | 3rd of 12, USPHL-Premier | Won Quarterfinals, 2–0 vs. Philadelphia Junior Flyers; Lost Semifinals, 0–2 vs. Jersey Hitmen |
| 2016–17 | 45 | 33 | 12 | — | 0 | 170 | 102 | 66 | 3rd of 10, USPHL-Premier | Won Quarterfinals, 2–0 vs. South Shore Kings; Won Semifinals, 2–1 vs. Syracuse Stars; Lost Finals, 0–2 vs. Islanders Hockey Club |
Advance to NCDC Division
| 2017–18 | 50 | 36 | 13 | — | 3 | 186 | 129 | 75 | 2nd of 11, NCDC | Won Quarterfinals, 2–1 vs. Syracuse Stars; Lost Semifinals, 1–2 vs. Jersey Hitmen |
| 2018–19 | 50 | 32 | 15 | — | 3 | 200 | 139 | 67 | 2nd of 12, NCDC | Won Quarterfinals, 2–0 vs. Boston Bandits; Won Semifinals, 2–1 vs. Northern Cyclones; Won Finals, 2–1 vs. Connecticut Jr. Rangers; League champions |
| 2019–20 | 50 | 39 | 8 | — | 3 | 208 | 129 | 81 | 2nd of 13, NCDC | Playoffs cancelled |
| 2020–21 | 42 | 30 | 9 | — | 3 | 160 | 99 | 63 | 1st of 7, North; 3rd of 13, NCDC | Won First Round, 2–1 vs. Boston Advantage; Won Second Round, 2–0 vs. Islanders Hockey Club; Lost Semifinal game, 2–10 vs. New Jersey Rockets |
| 2021–22 | 48 | 28 | 15 | 3 | 2 | 159 | 138 | 61 | 2nd of 7, North; 4th of 13, NCDC | Won Div. Semifinal, 2–1 vs. Twin City Thunder; Won Div. Final, 2-1 vs. New Hampshire Junior Monarchs; Lost League Final, 0-2 vs. New Jersey Hitmen |
| 2022–23 | 50 | 22 | 25 | - | 3 | 151 | 169 | 44 | 6th of 7, North; 11th of 14, NCDC | Did not Qualify for post season play |
| 2023–24 | 52 | 25 | 23 | 3 | 1 | 158 | 196 | 54 | 4th of 6, New England; 9th of 18, NCDC | Won Playin Game, 5-2 Northern Cyclones; Lost Div Semifinals, 0-2 Islanders Hockey Club |
| 2024–25 | Sold NCDC team sold to West Chester Wolves | | | | | | | | | |
| 2025–26 | 54 | 25 | 16 | 16 | 12 | 177 | 168 | 62 | 4th of 6, New England Central; 15th of 33, NCDC | Lost Div Semifinals, 0-3 Utica Jr. Comets |

== USA Hockey Tier III Jr National Championships ==
Round robin play in pool with top 4 teams advancing to semi-final.

| Year | Round Robin | Record | Standing | SemiFinal | Championship Game |
|---|---|---|---|---|---|
| 2014 | W, New Hampshire Jr. Monarchs (EHL) 5-3; W, Helena Bighorns (AWHL) 6-0; W, Marquette Royales (MnJHL) 11-1 | 3-0-0 | 1st of 4 Red Pool | W, Springfield Pics (USPHL Elite) 6-0 | W, North Iowa Bulls (NA3HL) 4-1; NATIONAL CHAMPIONS |

== Coach ==
Head coach Peter Masters functions as both head coach for the EJHL team and manager for all Junior Bruins activities. His responsibilities include program and organization development, direction of skill sessions and summer camps for youth hockey players and the Annual Junior Bruins Shootout Tournament in the fall and Beantown Classic Tournament in August.

Peter Masters, 2001 EJHL Coach of the Year, graduated from Boston College in 1997. While at Boston College, Masters played defense for the BC Eagles under coaches Steve Cedorchuk and Jerry York, and was recognized in 1997 as one of eight defensemen nationwide picked as Hobey Baker Award pre-season 'players to watch'.

== Alumni ==
Since 1992 the Junior Bruins have placed over 100 players in college hockey and since 2001 more than 35 have been recruited to Division I college teams.

Notable former Junior level Bruins players include:
Brendan Buckley (AHL)
Bobby Butler (NHL)
Jack Eichel (NHL)
Conor Garland (NHL)
Steve Moses (NHL)
Frank Vatrano (NHL)

Notable Youth level Bruins:
Sean Haggerty (NHL)
Blake Sloan (NHL)
Rudi Ying (KHL)
