= Jersey Hitmen =

Ice hockey team in Wayne, New Jersey, United States

- City: Wayne, New Jersey
- League: USPHL
- Conference: Atlantic
- Founded: 2003
- Home arena: Ice Vault Arena
- Colors: Navy blue, Carolina blue, and white
- Owner: Bobby Reiss
- General manager: James Hunt
- Head coach: Toby Harris
- Affiliate: Jersey Hitmen (Tier III)

Championships
- Regular season titles: 2018–19, 2019–20, 2020–21, 2021-22
- Division titles: 2021-22
- Playoff championships: 2021, 2022

The Jersey Hitmen are a junior and youth ice hockey organization with teams in the United States Premier Hockey League (USPHL), with its top level junior team playing in the USPHL's National Collegiate Development Conference (NCDC). The organization also has junior teams in the USPHL's Premier and Elite Divisions, as well as multiple youth teams from 10U to 18U. The teams play their home games at the Ice Vault Arena in Wayne, New Jersey.

The Hitmen used to field a 16U team in the Eastern Junior Elite Prospects League (EJEPL) and 14U teams in the Metro Elite Hockey League (MEHL) before joining the USPHL High Performance Youth Divisions.

== Regular season records ==
Season	GP	W	L	OTL	SOL	PTS	GF	GA	PIM	Finish
2017–18	50	34	15	1	—	69	209	127	—	3rd of 11, NCDC
2018–19	50	43	7	0	—	86	218	103	690	1st of 12, NCDC
2019–20	50	42	5	3	—	87	226	114	769	1st of 13, NCDC
2020–21	45	37	4	4	—	78	197	87	544	1st of 6, South; 1st of 13, NCDC
2021–22	49	35	11	3	—	73	234	186	646	1st of 6, South; 1st of 13, NCDC
2022–23	50	36	12	1	1	77	201	117	482	1st of 7, South; 1st of 14, NCDC
2023–24	52	22	25	3	2	49	148	158	742	4 of 6, Atlantic; 13th of 18, NCDC
2024–25	54	28	21	4	1	61	190	161	672	3 of 7, Atlantic; 11th of 22, NCDC
2025–26	54	34	15	3	2	73	194	124	456	2 of 7, Atlantic; 9th of 33, NCDC

== Playoff records ==
Season	GP	W	L	T	OTL	GF	GA	PIM	Results
2018	9	5	4	—	0	36	24	—	Won Quarterfinals 2–1 vs. Northern Cyclones; Won Semifinals 2–1 vs. Boston Junior Bruins; Lost Finals 1–2 vs. Islanders Hockey Club
2019	2	0	1	—	1	3	5	37	Lost Quarterfinals, 0–2 vs. Northern Cyclones
2020	Playoffs cancelled								
2021	4	4	0	—	0	20	8	36	Won Second Round, 2–0 vs. Connecticut Jr. Rangers; Won Semifinal, 6–1 vs. Twin City Thunder; Won Final, 5–2 vs. Rockets Hockey Club; Playoff Champions
2022	4	4	0	—	0	20	8	36	Won Div. Semifinal, 2–0 vs. P.A.L. Junior Islanders; Won Div. Final, 1-2 vs. Rockets Hockey Club; Won League Final, 2-0 vs. Boston Jr. Bruins; Playoff Champions (7th)
2023	2	0	2	—	0	5	10	48	Lost Div. Semifinal, 0-2 vs. Mercer Chiefs
2024	4	2	2	—	0	10	10	89	Won Playin game, 6-2 vs. Connecticut Jr. Rangers; Lost Div Semifinal, 1-2 P.A.L. Jr. Islanders
2025	4	1	3	—	0	12	14	22	Lost Div Semifinal, 1-3 Mercer Chiefs
2026	7	3	4	—	0	-	18	21	won Div Semifinal, 3-1 Rockets Hockey Club; Lost Div Finals 1-3 P.A.L. Jr. Islanders
