= 2024–25 EHL season =

- League: Eastern Hockey League
- Sport: Ice hockey
- Duration: Regular season September 19, 2024 – March 10, 2025; Postseason; March 18 – April 12
- Games: 46*
- Teams: 21

Regular season
- Season champions: Express Hockey Club
- Top scorer: Alexander Legkov (New Jersey 87's)

EHL Playoffs
- Finals champions: New Jersey 87's
- Runners-up: New Hampshire Avalanche

EHL seasons
- ← 2023–24 2025–26 →

The 2024–25 EHL season is the 11th season of the Eastern Hockey League. The regular season ran from September 19, 2024 to March 10, 2025 with a 46-game schedule for each team. The Express Hockey Club won a tie-breaker over the New Hampshire Avalanche to claim the regular season championship. The New Jersey 87's defeated the New Hampshire Avalanche 2–1 in the Frozen Final to win their second league championship.

== Member changes ==
- The Northeast Generals assumed control of the Bridgewater Bandits organization in January, 2024. While the collective group would rebrand as the 'Northeast Generals' for the 2024–25 season, the EHL team would retain the Bridgewater Bandits name.
- Team Maryland was sold to the Boston Hockey Academy on May 6, 2024. The franchise was moved to Tewksbury, Massachusetts and renamed as the Boston Dukes.
- On June 19, 2024, both the Boston Jr. Rangers and Railers Jr. Hockey Club announced that they were joining the United States Premier Hockey League for the 2024–25 season. Six days later, the Seacoast Spartans follow suit and joined the USPHL as well.
- The Connecticut Chiefs teams were sold on July 15, 2024. After moving to Simsbury, Connecticut, both clubs were renamed as the Connecticut Nor'Easter.
- The Boston Junior Eagles, who had originally planned on starting play in 2023, joined the league for this season.
- The Providence Hockey Club rebranded as the Providence Capitals.
- On November 11, 2024, the United States Premier Hockey League announced that the Boston Junior Terriers were accepted as a new league member for the 2025-26 season. The EHL determined that the franchise had breached the multi-year contract the two had signed in 2022 and were immediately suspended pending a resolution. The Terriers, since renamed Boston Dogs, joined the USPHL immediately after the suspension with the EHL having to readjust the remainder of the schedule to compensate.

== Regular season ==
The standings at the end of the regular season were as follows:

Note: x = clinched playoff berth; y = clinched division title; z = clinched regular season title

=== Standings ===
==== Central Division ====
| Team | GP | W | L | OTL | SOL | Pts | GF | GA |
|---|---|---|---|---|---|---|---|---|
| xy – Providence Capitals | 47 | 32 | 10 | 4 | 1 | 69 | 173 | 113 |
| x – HC Rhode Island | 46 | 20 | 18 | 6 | 2 | 48 | 128 | 132 |
| x – Connecticut Nor'Easter | 46 | 21 | 22 | 1 | 2 | 45 | 139 | 159 |
| x – Connecticut RoughRiders | 47 | 14 | 32 | 1 | 0 | 29 | 121 | 221 |
| New York Apple Core | 46 | 5 | 39 | 2 | 0 | 12 | 109 | 270 |

==== East Division ====
| Team | GP | W | L | OTL | SOL | Pts | GF | GA |
|---|---|---|---|---|---|---|---|---|
| xyz – Express Hockey Club | 46 | 36 | 3 | 4 | 3 | 79 | 156 | 73 |
| x – East Coast Wizards | 46 | 31 | 12 | 1 | 2 | 65 | 192 | 129 |
| x – Seahawks Hockey Club | 46 | 23 | 19 | 2 | 0 | 50 | 135 | 144 |
| x – Boston Junior Eagles | 46 | 18 | 25 | 3 | 0 | 39 | 127 | 152 |
| Bridgewater Bandits | 46 | 13 | 28 | 4 | 1 | 31 | 115 | 178 |
| Boston Junior Terriers ^{†} | 15 | 11 | 4 | 0 | 0 | 22 | 53 | 37 |

† The Boston Junior Terriers were suspended in November and subsequently left the EHL.

==== North Division ====
| Team | GP | W | L | OTL | SOL | Pts | GF | GA |
|---|---|---|---|---|---|---|---|---|
| xy – New Hampshire Avalanche | 46 | 37 | 4 | 0 | 5 | 79 | 216 | 79 |
| x – New England Wolves | 46 | 34 | 11 | 1 | 0 | 69 | 183 | 122 |
| x – Vermont Lumberjacks | 45 | 23 | 17 | 2 | 3 | 51 | 126 | 137 |
| x – Valley Jr. Warriors | 46 | 13 | 26 | 7 | 0 | 33 | 102 | 162 |
| Boston Dukes | 46 | 9 | 35 | 1 | 1 | 20 | 83 | 211 |

==== South Division ====
| Team | GP | W | L | OTL | SOL | Pts | GF | GA |
|---|---|---|---|---|---|---|---|---|
| xy – New Jersey Bears | 46 | 32 | 10 | 0 | 4 | 68 | 195 | 122 |
| x – New Jersey 87's | 46 | 33 | 12 | 1 | 0 | 67 | 207 | 110 |
| x – Pennsylvania Huntsmen | 46 | 23 | 18 | 4 | 1 | 51 | 176 | 145 |
| x – Philadelphia Hockey Club | 46 | 21 | 22 | 3 | 0 | 45 | 140 | 149 |
| Philadelphia Little Flyers | 46 | 19 | 23 | 2 | 2 | 42 | 143 | 174 |

=== Statistics ===
==== Scoring leaders ====
The following players led the league in regular season points at the completion of games played on April 12, 2025.

| Player | Team | GP | G | A | Pts | PIM |
|---|---|---|---|---|---|---|
| Alexander Legkov | New Jersey 87's | 38 | 31 | 66 | 97 | 6 |
| Daniel Kroon | Providence Capitals | 47 | 25 | 48 | 73 | 58 |
| Daxton St. Hilaire | East Coast Wizards | 46 | 31 | 40 | 71 | 18 |
| Deaglan Kelly | Providence Capitals | 43 | 30 | 38 | 68 | 55 |
| Ryan Arendes | Pennsylvania Huntsmen | 44 | 28 | 32 | 60 | 87 |
| Louis-Charles Tremblay | New Hampshire Avalanche | 46 | 23 | 33 | 56 | 24 |
| Danny Storella | New Hampshire Avalanche | 44 | 30 | 24 | 54 | 40 |
| Joey Ala | East Coast Wizards | 43 | 15 | 39 | 54 | 18 |
| Landon Adams | New Jersey 87's | 33 | 22 | 31 | 53 | 2 |
| Owen House | New Jersey Bears | 45 | 19 | 33 | 52 | 10 |
| Ben Carfora | New Hampshire Avalanche | 43 | 13 | 39 | 52 | 39 |

==== Leading goaltenders ====
Note: GP = Games played; Mins = Minutes played; W = Wins; L = Losses; OTL = Overtime losses; SOL = Shootout losses; SO = Shutouts; GAA = Goals against average; SV% = Save percentage

| Player | Team | GP | Mins | W | L | OTL | SO | GA | SV | SV% | GAA |
| Lukas Toth | Express Hockey Club | 18 | 979 | 12 | 0 | 2 | 5 | 22 | 482 | .956 | 1.35 |
| Wills Seagrave | New Hampshire Avalanche | 19 | 1,052 | 17 | 1 | 0 | 5 | 27 | 432 | .941 | 1.54 |
| Alex Koenig | Express Hockey Club | 29 | 1,612 | 22 | 3 | 2 | 8 | 42 | 828 | .951 | 1.56 |
| Alex Gerard | New Hampshire Avalanche | 23 | 1,300 | 15 | 3 | 0 | 3 | 40 | 572 | .935 | 1.85 |
| Kaden Clegg | Providence Capitals | 23 | 1,365 | 16 | 4 | 2 | 5 | 43 | 755 | .946 | 1.89 |

== EHL playoffs ==
Division Semifinals (Best-of-3)
N1 | New Hampshire Avalanche | 4 | 5 | -
N4 | Valley Jr. Warriors | 1 | 3 | -
North Division
N2 | New England Wolves | 6 | 2 | 0
N3 | Vermont Lumberjacks | 2 | 4 | 1
E1 | Express Hockey Club | 3* | 3 | -
E4 | Boston Junior Eagles | 2 | 0 | -
East Division
E2 | East Coast Wizards | 4 | 3 | 0
E3 | Seahawks Hockey Club | 0 | 4* | 2
C1 | Providence Capitals | 6 | 8 | -
C4 | Connecticut RoughRiders | 0 | 1 | -
Central Division
C2 | HC Rhode Island | 2 | 2 | 3
C3 | Connecticut Nor'Easter | 4 | 1 | 1
S1 | New Jersey Bears | 3 | 2 | -
S4 | Philadelphia Hockey Club | 5 | 5 | -
South Division
S2 | New Jersey 87's | 4* | 7 | -
S3 | Pennsylvania Huntsmen | 3 | 3 | -

Division Finals (Best-of-3)
N1 | New Hampshire Avalanche | 3* | 5 | -
N3 | Vermont Lumberjacks | 2 | 2 | -
E1 | Express Hockey Club | 1 | 2* | -
E3 | Seahawks Hockey Club | 0 | 1 | -
C1 | Providence Capitals | 4 | 5 | -
C2 | HC Rhode Island | 0 | 3 | -
S4 | Philadelphia Hockey Club | 1 | 4 | 0
S2 | New Jersey 87's | 7 | 2 | 3

Regional Finals (Best-of-3)
N1 | New Hampshire Avalanche | 8 | 3 | -
E1 | Express Hockey Club | 2 | 1 | -
C1 | Providence Capitals | 5 | 0 | 2
S2 | New Jersey 87's | 2 | 5 | 3

Frozen Finals (Best-of-1)
N1 | New Hampshire Avalanche | 1
S2 | New Jersey 87's | 2*

Note: * denotes overtime period(s)
