= 2018–19 EHL season =

- League: Eastern Hockey League
- Sport: Ice hockey
- Duration: Regular season September 2018 – March 2019; Postseason; March 2019
- Games: 46–44
- Teams: 19

Regular season
- Season champions: Philadelphia Little Flyers

EHL Playoffs
- Finals champions: New Hampshire Avalanche
- Runners-up: Philadelphia Little Flyers

EHL seasons
- ← 2017–18 2019–20 →

The 2018–19 EHL season was the 6th season of the Eastern Hockey League. The regular season ran from September 2018 to March 2019 with an unbalanced schedule. The Philadelphia Little Flyers won the regular season championship and went on to be defeated by the New Hampshire Avalanche 4 to 3 for the league championship.

== Member changes ==
- In the offseason, the New York Bobcats Royals with drew from the league and dissolved their junior program. The organization still operates its youth hockey program (as of 2025).
- Around the same time, the Total Athletics Seahawks rebranded as the Seahawks Hockey Club.
- A year after moving to Hamden, Connecticut, the Connecticut Oilers were purchased by the Connecticut Chiefs youth organization. The club then rebranded to match their new situation.
- Over the summer, the North Carolina Golden Bears and Team Maryland were approved as expansion franchises for this season.
- In addition, the New Jersey 87's, an extant team in the EHL's Premier Division, founded a second franchise and began operating clubs in both the EHL and EHL Premier Divisions.
- The Lehigh Valley Jr. Rebels, who had previously operated a franchise in the Elite Division, were also approved as an expansion franchise. In December, the Jr. Rebels were expelled from the league when they were discovered to be using an over-aged player. The player in question was reportedly 22 years old (junior ice hockey is restricted to players between the ages of 16 and 20) and used both a fake name and ID in order to register with USA Hockey. At the time the team had a record of 0–9–1, however, all of the games were immediately voided and removed from the league standings.

== Regular season ==
The standings at the end of the regular season were as follows:

Note: x = clinched playoff berth; y = clinched division title; z = clinched conference title; r = clinched regular season title

=== Standings ===
==== New England Conference ====
- North Division -

Team	GP	W	L	OTL	Pts	GF	GA
xyz – New Hampshire Avalanche	45	39	6	0	78	237	93
x – Vermont Lumberjacks	45	28	14	3	59	211	141
x – Boston Junior Rangers	46	27	15	4	58	170	115
Valley Jr. Warriors	44	16	21	7	39	146	202
New England Wolves	44	17	26	1	36	162	202

- South Division -

Team	GP	W	L	OTL	Pts	GF	GA
xy – East Coast Wizards	44	29	12	3	61	174	109
x – Seahawks Hockey Club	46	26	16	4	56	137	107
x – Connecticut RoughRiders	45	22	16	7	51	171	169
Walpole Express	45	18	20	7	43	143	160
Connecticut Chiefs	44	13	28	3	29	137	198

==== South Conference ====
- Central Division -

Team	GP	W	L	OTL	Pts	GF	GA
xy – New Jersey 87's	45	33	11	1	67	212	118
x – Wilkes-Barre/Scranton Knights	44	27	13	4	58	167	116
x – New York Apple Core	45	17	24	4	38	150	172
Lehigh Valley Jr. Rebels	expelled from league in December						

- Mid-Atlantic Division -

Team	GP	W	L	OTL	Pts	GF	GA
xyzr – Philadelphia Little Flyers	44	40	3	1	81	246	73
x – Philadelphia Revolution	44	27	15	2	56	190	117
x – Philadelphia Jr. Flyers	46	20	22	4	44	160	172
Team Maryland	46	10	35	1	21	99	250
North Carolina Golden Bears	46	5	39	2	12	110	331

== EHL playoffs ==
Note: All four division winners received byes to the conference semifinals and were seeded 1 and 2 in their respective brackets. The next four teams in each conference were seeded in the conference quarterfinals regardless of their division.

Conference Quarterfinals (Best-of-3)
N3	Vermont Lumberjacks	2
N6	Connecticut RoughRiders	0
N4	Boston Junior Rangers	2
N5	Seahawks Hockey Club	0
S3	Wilkes-Barre/Scranton Knights	2
S6	New York Apple Core	0
S4	Philadelphia Revolution	2
S5	Philadelphia Jr. Flyers	0

Conference Semifinals (Best-of-3)
N1	New Hampshire Avalanche	2
N4	Boston Junior Rangers	0
New England
N2	East Coast Wizards	2
N3	Vermont Lumberjacks	1
S1	Philadelphia Little Flyers	2
S4	Philadelphia Revolution	0
South
S2	New Jersey 87's	1
S3	Wilkes-Barre/Scranton Knights	2

Semifinals (Round Robin)
N1	New Hampshire Avalanche	-	4	3	4
N2	East Coast Wizards	1	-	3	7
S1	Philadelphia Little Flyers	2	4	-	6
S3	Wilkes-Barre/Scranton Knights	0	2	1	-

Championship (Best-of-1)
N1	New Hampshire Avalanche	4
S1	Philadelphia Little Flyers	3

Note: * denotes overtime period(s)
