= 2019–20 EHL season =

- League: Eastern Hockey League
- Sport: Ice hockey
- Duration: Regular season September 2019 – March 2020; Postseason; March 2020
- Games: 46
- Teams: 19

Regular season
- Season champions: Boston Junior Rangers

EHL Playoffs

EHL seasons
- ← 2018–19 2020–21 →

The 2019–20 EHL season was the 7th season of the Eastern Hockey League. The regular season ran from September 2019 to March 2020 with a 46-game schedule for all teams. The Boston Junior Rangers won the regular season championship. On March 13, 2020, the EHL suspended play due to the COVID-19 pandemic. The remainder of the postseason was later cancelled.

== Member changes ==
- On April 17, 2019, the Wilkes-Barre/Scranton Knights were one of six new programs invited to join the NA3HL. However, before the start of the season, the franchise folded.
- Over the summer, the Seacoast Spartans were approved as an expansion franchise for this season.
- Around the same time, the Worcester Jr. Railers were also added as an expansion franchise.

== Regular season ==
The standings at the end of the regular season were as follows:

Note: x = clinched playoff berth; y = clinched conference title; z = clinched regular season title

=== Standings ===
==== New England Conference ====
Team	GP	W	L	OTL	Pts	GF	GA
xyz – Boston Junior Rangers	46	39	5	2	80	208	104
x – New Hampshire Avalanche	46	33	9	4	70	185	87
x – Vermont Lumberjacks	46	34	11	1	69	209	131
x – Seahawks Hockey Club	46	31	15	0	62	158	101
x – Walpole Express	46	28	13	5	61	147	110
x – New England Wolves	46	25	16	5	55	170	161
x – East Coast Wizards	46	23	17	6	52	164	132
x – Seacoast Spartans	46	17	28	1	35	123	160
Connecticut Chiefs	46	14	28	4	32	112	182
Valley Jr. Warriors	46	13	31	2	28	123	186
Worcester Jr. Railers	46	7	36	3	17	111	240

==== Mid-Atlantic Conference ====
Team	GP	W	L	OTL	Pts	GF	GA
xy – New Jersey 87's	46	36	8	2	74	234	104
x – Philadelphia Revolution	46	30	12	4	64	192	117
x – Connecticut RoughRiders	46	28	14	4	60	191	165
x – Team Maryland	46	23	19	4	50	182	161
x – Philadelphia Little Flyers	46	23	20	3	49	161	159
x – Philadelphia Jr. Flyers	46	19	26	1	39	112	126
New York Apple Core	46	13	28	5	31	132	203
North Carolina Golden Bears	46	1	45	0	2	47	332

== EHL playoffs ==
Note: The top two seeds in both conferences received byes into the conference semifinal rounds. The third and fourth seeds received byes to the conference quarterfinal rounds.
Note: Due to the COVID-19 pandemic, the season was paused on March 13. A short time after, the remainder of the postseason was cancelled.

Preliminary Round (Best-of-1)
NE5	Walpole Express	3
NE8	Seacoast Spartans	5
NE6	New England Wolves	1
NE7	East Coast Wizards	2

Conference Quarterfinals (Best-of-3)
NE3	Vermont Lumberjacks	6	4	-
NE8	Seacoast Spartans	3	3	-
NE4	Seahawks Hockey Club	2	2	1
NE7	East Coast Wizards	3	1	2
MA3	Connecticut RoughRiders	6	1	4
MA6	Philadelphia Jr. Flyers	2	6	6
MA4	Team Maryland	3	1	3
MA5	Philadelphia Little Flyers	2	6	6

Note: * denotes overtime period(s)
