= 2023–24 EHL season =

- League: Eastern Hockey League
- Sport: Ice hockey
- Duration: Regular season September 14, 2023 – March 4, 2024; Postseason; March 7–30, 2024
- Games: 46
- Teams: 23

Regular season
- Season champions: Worcester Jr. Railers

EHL Playoffs
- Finals champions: Worcester Jr. Railers
- Runners-up: Boston Junior Rangers

EHL seasons
- ← 2022–23 2024–25 →

The 2023–24 EHL season was the 10th season of the Eastern Hockey League. The regular season ran from September 14, 2023, to March 4, 2024, with a planned 46-game schedule for all teams. The Worcester Jr. Railers won the regular season championship and went on to defeat the Boston Junior Rangers 6 to 0 for the league championship.

== Member changes ==
- On October 31, 2022, the EHL approved the addition of the Boston Junior Terriers and Providence Hockey Club as expansion franchises.
- In December, the Philadelphia Huntsmen were added as a second expansion team.
- On January 11, the sale of the Protec Jr. Ducks was announced. The team planned on relocating to Flemington, New Jersey at the end of the season. The new team was named the New Jersey Bears.
- In May, the EHL announced that the Bridgewater Bandits were being readmitted to the league, having spent the previous six seasons in the USPHL.

== Regular season ==
The standings at the end of the regular season were as follows:

Note: x = clinched playoff berth; y = clinched conference title; z = clinched regular season title

=== Standings ===
==== Central Division ====
Team	GP	W	L	OTL	SOL	Pts	GF	GA
xyz – Worcester Jr. Railers	46	36	8	2	0	74	190	86
x – New York Apple Core	46	34	11	1	0	69	201	117
x – Providence Hockey Club	46	20	20	5	1	46	131	156
x – HC Rhode Island	46	18	23	2	3	41	134	159
x – Connecticut Chiefs	46	17	25	3	1	38	124	175
Connecticut RoughRiders	46	11	32	3	0	25	120	216

==== East Division ====
Team	GP	W	L	OTL	SOL	Pts	GF	GA
xy – Express Hockey Club	46	34	10	1	1	70	155	95
x – Boston Junior Rangers	46	32	13	0	1	65	185	105
x – East Coast Wizards	46	29	11	3	3	64	177	146
x – Boston Junior Terriers	46	22	20	3	1	48	129	121
x – Seahawks Hockey Club	46	14	30	2	0	30	99	146
Bridgewater Bandits	46	12	31	0	3	27	106	189

==== North Division ====
Team	GP	W	L	OTL	SOL	Pts	GF	GA
xy – New Hampshire Avalanche	46	34	9	3	0	71	189	108
x – Seacoast Spartans	46	24	16	2	4	54	140	142
x – New England Wolves	46	21	19	4	2	48	145	151
x – Valley Jr. Warriors	46	17	21	6	2	42	134	163
Vermont Lumberjacks	46	20	25	0	1	41	126	168

==== South Division ====
Team	GP	W	L	OTL	SOL	Pts	GF	GA
xy – New Jersey Bears	46	29	12	4	1	63	148	110
x – New Jersey 87's	46	25	16	4	1	55	110	111
x – Philadelphia Little Flyers	46	24	18	2	2	52	135	125
x – Team Maryland	46	23	20	1	2	49	132	135
x – Philadelphia Hockey Club	46	17	24	2	3	39	108	146
Pennsylvania Huntsmen	46	16	27	2	1	35	110	158

== EHL playoffs ==
Note: Teams are reseeded after the Division Finals based upon regular season records. The final two rounds were held at the Schneider Arena in Providence, Rhode Island.

Division Qualifier (Best-of-1)
C4	HC Rhode Island	3
C5	Connecticut Chiefs	5
E4	Boston Junior Terriers	4
E5	Seahawks Hockey Club	6
S4	Philadelphia Little Flyers	5
S5	Philadelphia Hockey Club	2

Division Semifinals (Best-of-3)
C1	Worcester Jr. Railers	6	11	-
C5	Connecticut Chiefs	1	3	-
C2	New York Apple Core	3	2	-
C3	Providence Hockey Club	1	1	-
E1	Express Hockey Club	3	2	6
E5	Seahawks Hockey Club	2	3*	1
E2	Boston Junior Rangers	3	3***	-
E3	East Coast Wizards	2	2	-
N1	New Hampshire Avalanche	3	7	5
N4	Valley Jr. Warriors	4	1	2
N2	Seacoast Spartans	3*	4	-
N3	New England Wolves	2	1	-
S1	New Jersey Bears	1	1	-
S4	Philadelphia Little Flyers	4	3	-
S2	New Jersey 87's	3	3	-
S3	Team Maryland	2	2	-

Division Finals (Best-of-3)
C1	Worcester Jr. Railers	2	1	6
C2	New York Apple Core	1	5	0
E1	Express Hockey Club	2	1	1
E2	Boston Junior Rangers	1	4	3
N1	New Hampshire Avalanche	4*	7	-
N2	Seacoast Spartans	3	3	-
S4	Philadelphia Little Flyers	2	1**	-
S2	New Jersey 87's	1	0	-

Semifinals (Best-of-3)
1	Worcester Jr. Railers	4	5	5
4	Philadelphia Little Flyers	5*	1	0
2	New Hampshire Avalanche	2	4*	1
3	Boston Junior Rangers	5	3	6

Championship (Best-of-1)
1	Worcester Jr. Railers	6
3	Boston Junior Rangers	0

Note: * denotes overtime period(s)
