= 2020–21 EHL season =

- League: Eastern Hockey League
- Sport: Ice hockey
- Duration: Regular season September 2020 – March 2021; Postseason; March 2021
- Games: 38–13
- Teams: 18

Regular season
- Season champions: New Jersey 87's

EHL Playoffs
- Finals champions: Boston Junior Rangers
- Runners-up: New Hampshire Avalanche

EHL seasons
- ← 2019–20 2021–22 →

The 2020–21 EHL season was the 7th season of the Eastern Hockey League. The regular season ran from September 2020 to March 2021 with a planned 38-game schedule for all teams. The New Jersey 87's won the regular season championship. The Boston Junior Rangers defeated the New Hampshire Avalanche 3 to 2 in overtime for the league championship.

== Member changes ==
- In February of 2020, the EHL announced the addition of two new teams, the Keene Eclipse and Protec Jr. Ducks. The former were admitted as an expansion franchise while the latter had purchased the Philadelphia Jr. Flyers and relocated to Somerset, New Jersey.
- Due to the ongoing COVID-19 pandemic both the North Carolina Golden Bears and Philadelphia Revolution withdrew from the league and dissolved their junior programs. Both organizations continued to operate at the local youth level.
- Due to Massachusetts state restrictions on interstate travel and quarantine procedures, both the Connecticut Chiefs and Vermont Lumberjacks relocated to Massachusetts for this season. The Lumberjacks played out of the Waterville Valley Ice Arena and were temporarily renamed the Lumberjacks Hockey Club while the Chiefs used the Olympia Ice Center and were temporarily named the Western Mass Chiefs. Both returned to their former homes after the year.
- The Keene Eclipse withdrew from the league in early November due to complications from the pandemic as well as a lack of planning and foresight from ownership. Despite their issues, the EHL allowed the team to return for the following year.

== Regular season ==
The standings at the end of the regular season were as follows:

Note: x = clinched playoff berth; y = clinched conference title; z = clinched regular season title

=== Standings ===
==== North Division ====
Team	GP	W	L	OTL	Pts	GF	GA
xy – New Hampshire Avalanche	38	26	8	4	56	146	90
x – New England Wolves	36	20	13	3	43	139	140
x – Lumberjacks Hockey Club	35	17	17	1	35	133	142
x – Seacoast Spartans	38	16	19	3	35	114	139
Keene Eclipse	13	3	9	1	7	37	55

Note: Keene withdrew from the league in early November.

==== Central Division ====
Team	GP	W	L	OTL	Pts	GF	GA
xy – Boston Junior Rangers	38	32	5	1	65	168	77
x – Walpole Express	38	26	10	2	54	131	98
x – Western Mass Chiefs	38	17	17	4	38	124	138
x – Worcester Jr. Railers	38	18	20	0	36	116	144
x – East Coast Wizards	38	17	19	2	36	124	132
x – Seahawks Hockey Club	38	13	19	6	32	102	122
x – Valley Jr. Warriors	38	10	26	2	22	105	151

==== South Division ====
Team	GP	W	L	OTL	Pts	GF	GA
xyz – New Jersey 87's	38	32	2	2	67	186	82
x – Philadelphia Little Flyers	38	20	15	3	43	142	123
x – Protec Jr. Ducks	38	17	15	6	40	133	154
x – Team Maryland	38	16	15	7	39	128	146
x – Connecticut RoughRiders	37	14	19	4	32	127	176
x – New York Apple Core	37	12	22	3	27	128	174

== EHL playoffs ==
Note: For the Round Robin Semifinal, the non-division champion with the best regular season record received an at-large bid. The final two rounds were held at the Ice Line Quad Rinks in West Chester, Pennsylvania.

Division Quarterfinals (Best-of-3)
C2	Walpole Express	4	5	-
C7	Valley Jr. Warriors	2	3	-
C3	Western Mass Chiefs	2*	3	-
C6	Seahawks Hockey Club	1	0	-
C4	Worcester Jr. Railers	5	4	7*
C5	East Coast Wizards	3	6	6
S3	Protec Jr. Ducks	1	2*	-
S6	New York Apple Core	0	1	-
S4	Team Maryland	5	6	-
S5	Connecticut RoughRiders	2	0	-

Division Semifinals (Best-of-3)
N1	New Hampshire Avalanche	2	4	-
N4	Seacoast Spartans	3	5*	-
North
N2	New England Wolves	3	4	-
N3	Lumberjacks Hockey Club	7	6	-
C1	Boston Junior Rangers	5	6	-
C4	Worcester Jr. Railers	2	0	-
Central
C2	Walpole Express	4	5	-
C3	Western Mass Chiefs	1	3	-
S1	New Jersey 87's	6	5	-
S4	Team Maryland	3	0	-
South
S2	Philadelphia Little Flyers	5	4	-
S3	Protec Jr. Ducks	2	2	-

Division Finals (Best-of-3)
N4	Seacoast Spartans	4	2	-
N3	Lumberjacks Hockey Club	5	5	-
C1	Boston Junior Rangers	3	4	-
C2	Walpole Express	1	3	-
S1	New Jersey 87's	3	3*	-
S2	Philadelphia Little Flyers	2	2	-

Semifinals (Round Robin)
N3	Lumberjacks Hockey Club	–	5	5	3
C1	Boston Junior Rangers	3	–	5	2
S1	New Jersey 87's	6	3	–	4
A	New Hampshire Avalanche	9	1	5	–

Championship (Best-of-1)
C1	Boston Junior Rangers	3*
A	New Hampshire Avalanche	2

Note: * denotes overtime period(s)
