= 2022–23 EHL season =

- League: Eastern Hockey League
- Sport: Ice hockey
- Duration: Regular season September 15, 2022 – March 5, 2023; Postseason; March 7–26, 2023
- Games: 46
- Teams: 19

Regular season
- Season champions: New Hampshire Avalanche
- Season MVP: William Pray (Seacoast Spartans)
- Top scorer: Drew Olivieri (Seacoast Spartans)

EHL Playoffs
- Finals champions: Boston Junior Rangers
- Runners-up: New Hampshire Avalanche

EHL seasons
- ← 2021–22 2023–24 →

The 2022–23 EHL season was the 9th season of the Eastern Hockey League and first as a Tier II independent league. The regular season ran from September 15, 2022, to March 5, 2023, with a planned 46-game schedule for all teams. The New Hampshire Avalanche won the regular season championship and went on to be defeated by the Boston Junior Rangers 4 to 2 for the league championship.

== League restructured ==
In May 2022, the Eastern Hockey League announced that they were leaving USA Hockey oversight and would continue to operate as an independent league. As a result of the move, the EHL was able to promote their primary league to Tier II status while the EHL Premier became Tier III. All teams that previously operated in both leagues followed with the changes, promoting their respective franchises in turn.

== Member changes ==
- In March 2022, the Rhode Island Hockey Academy reached an agreement with the EHL to add an expansion franchise for this season. The team would operate under the name HC Rhode Island.
- After being removed from the USPHL at the end of the previous season, the Philadelphia Hockey Club were admitted to the EHL in May.
- Over the summer, the Walpole Express rebranded as the Express Hockey Club.

== Regular season ==
The standings at the end of the regular season were as follows:

Note: x = clinched playoff berth; y = clinched conference title; z = clinched regular season title

=== Standings ===
==== Central Division ====
Team	GP	W	L	OTL	SOL	Pts	GF	GA
xy – Worcester Jr. Railers	46	30	14	0	2	62	151	102
x – HC Rhode Island	46	17	25	3	1	38	114	170
x – Connecticut Chiefs	46	15	25	6	0	36	100	136
x – Connecticut RoughRiders	46	13	28	2	3	31	125	182
x – New York Apple Core	46	14	29	2	1	31	98	167

==== East Division ====
Team	GP	W	L	OTL	SOL	Pts	GF	GA
xy – Express Hockey Club	46	30	15	1	0	61	126	97
x – Boston Junior Rangers	46	29	15	1	1	60	145	100
x – Seahawks Hockey Club	46	21	19	4	2	48	132	148
x – East Coast Wizards	46	18	20	3	5	44	128	148
x – Valley Jr. Warriors	46	17	25	3	1	38	109	150

==== North Division ====
Team	GP	W	L	OTL	SOL	Pts	GF	GA
xyz – New Hampshire Avalanche	46	34	9	3	0	71	187	122
x – Seacoast Spartans	46	30	12	4	0	64	162	126
x – New England Wolves	46	26	17	1	2	55	163	157
x – Vermont Lumberjacks	46	25	20	1	0	51	158	136

==== South Division ====
Team	GP	W	L	OTL	SOL	Pts	GF	GA
xy – Protec Jr. Ducks	46	27	15	4	0	58	140	130
x – New Jersey 87's	46	26	14	5	1	58	113	90
x – Philadelphia Little Flyers	46	23	16	4	3	51	151	146
x – Team Maryland	46	22	17	3	1	48	131	120
x – Philadelphia Hockey Club	46	20	22	3	1	44	139	141

== EHL playoffs ==
Note: Teams are reseeded after the Division Finals based upon regular season records. The final two rounds were held at the Schneider Arena in Providence, Rhode Island.

Division Qualifier (Best-of-1)
C4	Connecticut RoughRiders	6
C5	New York Apple Core	5
E4	East Coast Wizards	3
E5	Valley Jr. Warriors	2
S4	Team Maryland	7
S5	Philadelphia Hockey Club	1

Division Semifinals (Best-of-3)
C1	Worcester Jr. Railers	7	4	-
C4	Connecticut RoughRiders	2	3	-
C2	HC Rhode Island	4	2	1
C3	Connecticut Chiefs	1	4	2
E1	Express Hockey Club	3	3	-
E4	East Coast Wizards	1	0	-
E2	Boston Junior Rangers	4	4	-
E3	Seahawks Hockey Club	2	2	-
N1	New Hampshire Avalanche	5	6	-
N4	Vermont Lumberjacks	2	1	-
N2	Seacoast Spartans	6	4	-
N3	New England Wolves	3	2	-
S1	Protec Jr. Ducks	3	1	0
S4	Team Maryland	2	4	4
S2	New Jersey 87's	5	1	3
S3	Philadelphia Little Flyers	0	3	4*

Division Finals (Best-of-3)
C1	Worcester Jr. Railers	4	0	1
C3	Connecticut Chiefs	2	3	0
E1	Express Hockey Club	1	1	1
E2	Boston Junior Rangers	0	2	2***
N1	New Hampshire Avalanche	3	4	3*
N2	Seacoast Spartans	5	1	2
S4	Team Maryland	1	4	1
S3	Philadelphia Little Flyers	2*	2	3

Semifinals (Best-of-3)
1	New Hampshire Avalanche	5	6	-
4	Philadelphia Little Flyers	1	5	-
2	Worcester Jr. Railers	3	0	2
3	Boston Junior Rangers	1	1	5

Championship (Best-of-1)
1	New Hampshire Avalanche	2
3	Boston Junior Rangers	4

Note: * denotes overtime period(s)
