= 2021–22 EHL season =

- League: Eastern Hockey League
- Sport: Ice hockey
- Duration: Regular season September 2021 – March 2022; Postseason; March 2022
- Games: 46
- Teams: 18*

Regular season
- Season champions: Boston Junior Rangers

EHL Playoffs
- Finals champions: New Jersey 87's
- Runners-up: Walpole Express

EHL seasons
- ← 2020–21 2022–23 →

The 2021–22 EHL season was the 8th season of the Eastern Hockey League. The regular season ran from September 2021 to March 2022 with a planned 46-game schedule for all teams. The Boston Junior Rangers won the regular season championship. The New Jersey 87's defeated the Walpole Express 2 to 0 for the league championship.

== Member changes ==
- After the Keene Eclipse withdrew from the league in early November of the previous season, the EHL allowed the team to return for this year. In the interim, the team rebranded as the Maine Eclipse. Reportedly, just after the beginning of the season, USA Hockey permanently banned one of the Eclipse's coaches due him running an unsanctioned event over the summer. As a result, the team then forfeited two games in late September before being expelled from the league. The few games that Maine had played were wiped from league standings with the remaining schedules readjusted so that all teams played an even number of games.

== Regular season ==
The standings at the end of the regular season were as follows:

Note: x = clinched playoff berth; y = clinched conference title; z = clinched regular season title

=== Standings ===
==== Central Division ====
Team	GP	W	L	OTL	Pts	GF	GA
xy – Worcester Jr. Railers	46	28	15	3	59	163	139
x – Connecticut Chiefs	46	18	23	5	41	140	158
x – Connecticut RoughRiders	46	14	26	6	34	139	240
x – New York Apple Core	46	12	30	4	28	148	224

==== East Division ====
Team	GP	W	L	OTL	Pts	GF	GA
xyz – Boston Junior Rangers	46	34	9	3	71	150	84
x – Walpole Express	46	27	17	2	56	130	115
x – East Coast Wizards	46	20	23	3	43	115	145
x – Valley Jr. Warriors	46	18	21	7	43	140	158
x – Seahawks Hockey Club	46	15	23	8	38	127	171

==== North Division ====
Team	GP	W	L	OTL	Pts	GF	GA
xy – New Hampshire Avalanche	46	32	9	5	69	179	97
x – New England Wolves	46	23	19	4	50	138	168
x – Vermont Lumberjacks	46	21	20	5	47	168	152
x – Seacoast Spartans	46	19	23	4	42	147	174
Maine Eclipse	Expelled in late-September						

Note: At the time of Maine's expulsion, they possessed a record of 0–4. However, all games were subsequently erased from league standings.

==== South Division ====
Team	GP	W	L	OTL	Pts	GF	GA
xy – Philadelphia Little Flyers	46	30	12	4	64	210	137
x – New Jersey 87's	46	30	12	4	64	160	113
x – Protec Jr. Ducks	46	25	16	5	55	147	144
x – Team Maryland	46	25	19	2	52	157	139

== EHL playoffs ==
Note: The four division champions advanced directly to the round robin quarterfinal. The four teams that lost in the division finals played in two wild-card qualifiers to determine the final two round robin qualifiers. The final three rounds were held at the Schneider Arena in Providence, Rhode Island.

Division Qualifier (Best-of-1)
E4	Valley Jr. Warriors	2
E5	Seahawks Hockey Club	3*

Division Semifinals (Best-of-3)
N1	New Hampshire Avalanche	6	6*	-
N4	Seacoast Spartans	3	5	-
North
N2	New England Wolves	3	2*	3
N3	Vermont Lumberjacks	6	1	1
E1	Boston Junior Rangers	1	6	-
E5	Seahawks Hockey Club	0	0	-
East
E2	Walpole Express	3	1	5
E3	East Coast Wizards	1	2***	2
C1	Worcester Jr. Railers	7	3	6
C4	New York Apple Core	0	4	3
Central
C2	Connecticut Chiefs	5	4	-
C3	Connecticut RoughRiders	1	2	-
S1	Philadelphia Little Flyers	6	5	-
S4	Team Maryland	2	2	-
South
S2	New Jersey 87's	7	8	-
S3	Protec Jr. Ducks	1	0	-

Division Finals (Best-of-3)
N1	New Hampshire Avalanche	3	4	-
N2	New England Wolves	1	3	-
E1	Boston Junior Rangers	1	1	-
E2	Walpole Express	2	3	-
C1	Worcester Jr. Railers	4	2	7
C2	Connecticut Chiefs	1	4	0
S1	Philadelphia Little Flyers	3	2	-
S2	New Jersey 87's	2	1	-

Wild Card (Best-of-1)
N2	New England Wolves	2*
E1	Boston Junior Rangers	1
C2	Connecticut Chiefs	2
S2	New Jersey 87's	3*

Quarterfinals (Round Robin)
N1	New Hampshire Avalanche	–	0	1
E2	Walpole Express	2	–	0
N2	New England Wolves	2*	2	–
C1	Worcester Jr. Railers	–	4	4
S1	Philadelphia Little Flyers	0	–	2
S2	New Jersey 87's	2	6	–

Semifinals (Best-of-1)
N2	New England Wolves	1
S2	New Jersey 87's	3
C1	Worcester Jr. Railers	1
E2	Walpole Express	3

Championship (Best-of-1)
S2	New Jersey 87's	2
E2	Walpole Express	0

Note: * denotes overtime period(s)
