= 2017–18 EHL season =

- League: Eastern Hockey League
- Sport: Ice hockey
- Duration: Regular season September 2017 – March 2018; Postseason; March 2018
- Games: 50
- Teams: 16

Regular season
- Season champions: Philadelphia Revolution

EHL Playoffs
- Finals champions: New Hampshire Avalanche
- Runners-up: Philadelphia Revolution

EHL seasons
- ← 2016–17 2018–19 →

The 2017–18 EHL season was the 5th season of the Eastern Hockey League. The regular season ran from September 2017 to March 2018 with a 50-game schedule for each team. The Philadelphia Revolution won the regular season championship and went on to be defeated by the New Hampshire Avalanche 3 to 2 for the league championship.

== League Rebrand ==
For this season, the EHL rebranded its different tiers. The primary league would drop the "Premier" moniker and simply be called the "Eastern Hockey League" or EHL. The Elite Division would then become the new Premier Division. While the name changes could lead to some confusion, the league stuck with this new arrangement for many years afterwards.

== Member changes ==
- In October of 2016, the United States Premier Hockey League announced the formation of a new Tier II league starting the following fall. By December, six EHL members (the Boston Bandits, Connecticut Nighthawks, Hartford Jr. Wolfpack, New Hampshire Junior Monarchs, New Jersey Rockets, and Northern Cyclones) announced that they would be joining the USPHL for the upcoming season. After losing more than a third of the league in one fell swoop, the EHL responded by bringing in several new teams.
- During their year-long hiatus, the New York Bobcats had merged with the Long Island Royals organization. The Bobcats, now referred to as the "Bobcats Royals", rejoined the EHL while the Royals joined the Premier Division.
- Shortly afterwards, the Wilkes-Barre/Scranton Knights, who had restarted their Tier III club in 2016, agreed to transferred the outfit back into the EHL.
- After recouping two former members, the league then added expansion teams in the form of the New Hampshire Avalanche and Total Athletics Seahawks.
- Finally, the Superior RoughRiders of the Western States Hockey League announced plans to partner with a new eastern affiliate. The Roughriders would eventually reach an agreement with the EHL whereby the Connecticut Oilers would relocate to Hamden, Connecticut. This allowed a new club, the Connecticut RoughRiders to use the SoNo Ice House, the Oilers former arena, as their home venue.

== Regular season ==
The standings at the end of the regular season were as follows:

Note: x = clinched playoff berth; y = clinched division title; z = clinched conference title; r = clinched regular season title

=== Standings ===
==== Northern Conference ====
- New England Division -

Team	GP	W	L	OTL	Pts	GF	GA
xyz – New Hampshire Avalanche	50	39	7	4	82	204	99
x – Vermont Lumberjacks	50	24	24	2	50	163	162
x – New England Wolves	50	17	31	2	36	146	234
Valley Jr. Warriors	50	15	31	4	34	131	191

- Boston Division -

Team	GP	W	L	OTL	Pts	GF	GA
xy – Boston Junior Rangers	50	38	11	1	77	197	114
x – Walpole Express	50	36	11	3	75	207	123
x – East Coast Wizards	50	29	18	3	61	170	147
Total Athletics Seahawks	50	14	30	6	34	107	177

==== Southern Conference ====
- Central Division -

Team	GP	W	L	OTL	Pts	GF	GA
xy – Connecticut RoughRiders	50	31	18	1	63	206	139
x – New York Apple Core	50	23	18	9	55	160	157
x – Connecticut Oilers	50	14	33	3	31	118	205
New York Bobcats Royals	50	4	42	4	12	92	298

- Mid-Atlantic Division -

Team	GP	W	L	OTL	Pts	GF	GA
xyzr – Philadelphia Revolution	50	41	8	1	83	234	99
x – Philadelphia Little Flyers	50	39	9	2	80	213	104
x – Wilkes-Barre/Scranton Knights	50	24	25	1	49	170	180
Philadelphia Jr. Flyers	50	12	32	6	30	98	187

== EHL playoffs ==
Note: All four division winners received byes to the conference semifinals and were seeded 1 and 2 in their respective brackets. The next four teams in each conference were seeded in the conference quarterfinals regardless of their division.

Conference Quarterfinals (Best-of-3)
N3	Walpole Express	2
N6	New England Wolves	0
N4	East Coast Wizards	2
N5	Vermont Lumberjacks	0
S3	Philadelphia Little Flyers	2
S6	Connecticut Oilers	1
S4	New York Apple Core	2
S5	Wilkes-Barre/Scranton Knights	1

Conference Semifinals (Best-of-3)
N1	New Hampshire Avalanche	2
N4	East Coast Wizards	0
Northern
N2	Boston Junior Rangers	2
N3	Walpole Express	0
S1	Philadelphia Revolution	2
S4	New York Apple Core	0
Southern
S2	Connecticut RoughRiders	0
S3	Philadelphia Little Flyers	2

Semifinals (Round Robin)
N1	New Hampshire Avalanche	-	7	3	1
N2	Boston Junior Rangers	4	-	0	3
S1	Philadelphia Revolution	1	4	-	3
S3	Philadelphia Little Flyers	2	4*	0	-

Championship (Best-of-1)
N1	New Hampshire Avalanche	3
S1	Philadelphia Revolution	2

Note: * denotes overtime period(s)
