= Metropolitan Junior Hockey League =

Ice hockey league

- Formerly: Metropolitan Junior Hockey League (1966–2016); North American 3 Atlantic Hockey League (2016–17)
- Sport: Ice hockey
- Founded: 1966
- Commissioner: Craig Barnett
- Country: United States
- Most recent champion: Long Island Royals (2016–17)
- Official website: NA3AHL.com

The Metropolitan Junior Hockey League was an American Tier III Junior ice hockey league with teams throughout the eastern United States. The MJHL was part of the Atlantic Metropolitan Hockey League organization. Founded in 1966 by New York Rangers GM, Emile Francis, the Metropolitan Junior Hockey League played its 50th season in 2015–16. Prior to its 51st season, the league's operations were taken over by the North American Hockey League and it was renamed to North American 3 Atlantic Hockey League (NA3AHL) for the 2016–17 season. In 2017, the remaining teams joined the Eastern Hockey League.

== History ==
The MetJHL was affiliated with higher level Atlantic Junior Hockey League (AJHL), a Tier III Junior A league, while the MetJHL was sanctioned as a Tier III Junior B league until 2011 when USA Hockey dropped the letter designations in Tier III. In May 2012, the AJHL left the Atlantic Metropolitan Hockey League family and became its own entity managed by the team owners. In 2013, as part of a large re-organization of Tier III junior hockey, the AJHL re-branded itself to the Eastern Hockey League (EHL).

The league does place a number of players into NCAA colleges, with most going to Division III, and some to Division I.

During the off-season of 2014, several new organizations joined the MET League and it became a 23 team league and added a fourth division. In December 2014, the Eastern Hockey League (EHL) announced the formation of an Elite Division for the 2015–16 season, which effectively removed eight developmental teams for the EHL from the MJHL. The Metropolitan league planned to offset the loss with the return of New Jersey Rockets and the addition of teams from the New Jersey Colonials organization. The Metropolitan Junior Hockey League would also drop its MET League and MetJHL monikers to MJHL (likely due to the Minnesota Junior Hockey League (MnJHL) and Midwest Junior Hockey League (MWJHL) ceasing operations after the 2014–15 season).

After the league's 50th season in 2015–16, the league lost another eight teams to the EHL-Elite Division (then renamed to EHL-19U Elite). On March 29, 2016, the league announced that its operations had been acquired by the Tier II North American Hockey League and was renamed to the North American 3 Atlantic Hockey League (NA3AHL).

In February 2017, the EHL announced that they would expand after the league lost several teams to the United States Premier Hockey League's new tuition-free based league, the National Collegiate Development Conference (NCDC). Of the new teams added to the EHL, six were from the NA3AHL, the Central Penn Panthers, Jersey Wildcats, Long Island Royals, Metro Fighting Moose, New Jersey Renegades, and the Wilkes-Barre/Scranton Knights. The only NA3AHL team not included was the Exton Bulls who were sitting at last place with two wins while also regularly losing by double-digit scores. The Metro Fighting Moose left the EHL during the 2017 offseason.

The Long Island Royals were the final Foster Cup champions.

== Final teams ==
Team	City
Central Penn Panthers	Lancaster, Pennsylvania
Exton Bulls	Exton, Pennsylvania
Jersey Wildcats	Wharton, New Jersey
Long Island Royals	Syosset, New York
Metro Fighting Moose	Brooklyn, New York
New Jersey Renegades	Flemington, New Jersey
Wilkes-Barre/Scranton Knights	Pittston, Pennsylvania

== Former teams ==
- Allentown Argonauts
- Atlanta Knights
- Baltimore Bandits
- Brewster Bulldogs
- Brick NJ Juniors
- Boston Bandits
- Boston Junior Rangers
- Bucks County Generals
- Charleston Wolverines
- Connecticut Nighthawks
- Cranston Reds
- East Coast Eagles
- Fairfax Juniors
- Florida Eels
- Florida Junior Blades
- Fredrick Freeze
- Hampton Roads Junior Whalers
- Hartford Jr. Wolfpack
- Hershey Junior Bears
- Hudson Valley Eagles
- Jacksonville Ice Dogs
- Laconia Leafs
- New England Wolves
- New Hampshire Junior Monarchs
- New Jersey Junior Devils
- New Jersey Junior Titans
- New Jersey Colonials
- New Jersey Rockets
- New York Apple Core
- New York Junior Islanders
- New York Saints
- North Jersey Avalanche
- Northern Cyclones
- Palm Beach Hawks
- Philadelphia Junior Flyers
- Philadelphia Little Flyers
- Philadelphia Revolution
- Portland Jr. Pirates
- Ramapo Jr. Rangers
- Richmond Generals
- Rye Rangers
- Space Coast Hurricanes
- Springfield Junior Indians
- Somerset Chill
- Tampa Bay Juniors
- Troy Eagles
- Valley Forge Minutemen
- Valley Jr. Warriors
- Vermont Lumberjacks
- Walpole Express
- Washington Junior Nationals
- Washington Jr. Caps

== See also ==
- List of ice hockey leagues
