= Boston Shamrocks =

Boston Shamrocks may refer to:

- Boston Shamrocks (AFL), an American football team
- Boston Shamrocks (basketball), a basketball exhibition team
- Boston Jr. Shamrocks, a Junior A hockey team playing in the Eastern Junior Hockey League
