= Boston Junior Eagles =

- City: Wellesley, Massachusetts
- League: Eastern Hockey League
- Division: North
- Founded: 2024
- Folded: 2025
- Home arena: Boston Sports Institute
- Colors: Maroon and gold
- Head coach: Ian Moran

The Boston Junior Eagles (aka Boston Jr. Eagles) was a Tier III junior ice hockey team playing in the Eastern Hockey League (EHL). The Jr. Eagles play their home games at the Boston Sports Institute in Wellesley, Massachusetts.

== History ==
The Boston Junior Eagles organization was formed in 1993 and serves the greater Boston area as a developmental system for youth ice hockey. Though it supports more than 30 teams, the Jr. Eagles formed its first official Tier III club when it was accepted as an expansion franchise in the Eastern Hockey League in 2022. Though initially slated to begin in the fall of '23, the team's start was pushed back for a year and the club had its inaugural season in 2024–25.

The Boston Junior Eagles organization folded in 2025 along with the Vermont Lumberjacks.

== Season-by-season records ==
Season	GP	W	L	OTL	SOL	Pts	GF	GA	Regular season finish	Playoffs
2024–25	46	18	25	3	0	39	127	152	4th of 6, East Div. 15th of 20, EHL	Lost Div. Semifinal series, 0–2 (Express Hockey Club)
