= Pennsylvania Huntsmen =

- City: Exton, Pennsylvania
- League: Eastern Hockey League
- Division: East
- Founded: 2023
- Home arena: Power Play Rinks
- Colors: Gray, green
- General manager: Zach Overholtzer
- Head coach: Zac Desjardins

Franchise history
- 2023–Present: Pennsylvania Huntsmen

The Pennsylvania Huntsmen are a Tier II junior ice hockey team playing in the Eastern Hockey League (EHL). The Huntsmen play their home games at the Power Play Rinks in Exton, Pennsylvania.

== History ==
In December 2022, the Eastern Hockey League approved the addition of the Pennsylvania Huntsmen as an expansion team for the following season.

== Season-by-season records ==
Season	GP	W	L	T	OTL	Pts	GF	GA	Regular season finish	Playoffs
2023–24	46	16	27	2	1	35	110	158	6th of 6, South Div. 20th of 23, EHL	Did not qualify
2024–25	46	23	18	4	1	51	176	145	3rd of 5, South Div. t-8th of 21, EHL	Lost Div. Semifinal series, 0–2 (New Jersey 87's)
2025–26	50	2	46	2	0	6	70	289	5th of 5, South Div. t-20th of 20, EHL	Did not qualify for post season play
