= Seahawks Hockey Club =

- City: South Dennis, Massachusetts
- League: Eastern Hockey League
- Division: East
- Founded: 2017
- Home arena: Tony Kent Arena
- Colors: Blue, green and white
- General manager: Bill Zaniboni
- Head coach: Bill Zaniboni

Franchise history
- 2017–2018: Total Athletics Seahawks
- 2018–Present: Seahawks Hockey Club

The Seahawks Hockey Club are a Tier II junior ice hockey team playing in the Eastern Hockey League (EHL). The Seahawks play their home games at the Tony Kent Arena in South Dennis, Massachusetts.

== History ==
In 2017, the Eastern Hockey League announced expansion plans that included adding a team in Hyannis, Massachusetts. The parent organization, Total Athletics, did not yet have a home ice hockey rink so the club, then-called Total Athletics Seahawks, played its first season out of the Hyannis Youth & Community Center. Afterwards, the club was rebranded as the Seahawks Hockey Club and moved into the Tony Kent Arena in nearby South Dennis, Massachusetts.

== Season-by-season records ==
Season	GP	W	L	T	OTL	Pts	GF	GA	Regular season finish	Playoffs
Total Athletics Seahawks
2017–18	50	14	30	—	6	34	107	177	4th of 4, Boston Div. t-7th of 8, South Conf. t-12th of 16, EHL	Did not qualify
Seahawks Hockey Club
2018–19	46	26	16	—	4	56	137	107	2nd of 5, South Div. 5th of 10, New England Conf. t-8th of 18, EHL	Lost Conf. Quarterfinal series, 0–2 (Boston Junior Rangers)
2019–20	46	31	15	—	0	62	158	101	4th of 8, New England Conf. 6th of 19, EHL	Lost Conf. Quarterfinal series, 1–2 (East Coast Wizards)
2020–21	38	13	19	—	6	32	102	122	6th of 7, Central Div. t-14th of 17, EHL	Lost Div. Quarterfinal series, 0–2 (Western Mass Chiefs)
2021–22	46	15	23	—	8	38	127	171	5th of 5, East Div. 15th of 17, EHL	Won Div. Qualifier, 3–2 (OT) (Valley Jr. Warriors); Lost Div. Semifinal series, 0–2 (Boston Junior Rangers)
2022–23	46	21	19	4	2	48	132	148	3rd of 5, East Div. t-11th of 19, EHL	Lost Div. Semifinal series, 0–2 Boston Junior Rangers
2023–24	46	14	30	2	1	30	99	146	5th of 6, East Div. 21st of 23, EHL	Won Div. Qualifier, 6–4 (Boston Junior Terriers); Lost Div. Semifinal series, 1–2 (Express Hockey Club)
2024–25	46	23	19	2	0	50	135	144	3rd of 6, East Div. 10th of 21, EHL	Won Div. Semifinal series, 2–1 (East Coast Wizards); Lost Div. Final series, 1–2 (Express Hockey Club)
2025–26	50	34	11	3	2	73	217	131	1st of 3, East Div. 4th of 20, EHL	Div. Semifinal - bye Won Div. Final, 2-1 (Express Hockey Club); Won League Semifinals 2-1 (New Hampshire Avalanche); Won League Finals 2-1 (New Jersey Bears)
