= New York Bobcats =

- City: Dix Hills, New York
- League: Metropolitan Junior Hockey League (2000–2003); Atlantic Junior Hockey League (2003–2013); EHL-Premier (2013–2016); Eastern Hockey League (2017–2018)
- Founded: 2000
- Home arena: Dix Hills Ice Arena
- Colors: Dark green, black, white
- Owners: Ron & Joel Friedman and Chris & Peter Ferraro
- Website: New York Bobcats

Franchise history
- 2000–2016: New York Bobcats
- 2017–2018: New York Bobcats Royals

The New York Bobcats (also called New York Bobcats Royals) were a USA Hockey-sanctioned Tier III junior ice hockey organization from Dix Hills, New York, at the Dix Hills Ice Arena. The team was most recently a member of the Eastern Hockey League in the 2017–18 season.

== History ==
The Bobcats organization was founded in 2000 as a member of the Tier III Junior B Metropolitan Junior Hockey League (MetJHL) winning the league playoffs in 2002 and qualified for the 2002 Tier III Junior B National Championships. In 2003, the Bobcats became one of the charter members of the Tier III Junior A Atlantic Junior Hockey League (AJHL) along with five other MetJHL organizations. The Bobcats would go on to win the regular season and playoff titles in 2006 and 2007 while in the AJHL. In 2013, Tier III junior hockey leagues were reorganized and the AJHL became the Eastern Hockey League (EHL). In 2015, the EHL added a lower level division (formerly called Junior B) called the EHL-Elite Division and added all the current EHL teams (including the Bobcats) to the EHL-Premier Division. In 2016, head coach and general manager Craig Doremus took the same positions with the Tier II junior New Jersey Titans of the North American Hockey League. Subsequently, the Bobcats were no longer listed as part of the EHL and as of July 2016 have not announced any plans for the following seasons. At the time they were playing out of The Twin Rinks at Eisenhower Park in East Meadow, New York.

In 2017, the Bobcats returned from hiatus and began play out of the Dix Hills Ice Arena in Dix Hills, New York. The team announced Ken Hoey as the new head coach after three seasons with the Bobcats affiliate, the Long Island Jr. Royals of the North American 3 Atlantic Hockey League. Upon their return, the top level Bobcats were often called the Bobcats Royals after the Jr. Royals also joined the EHL in the developmental Tier III division.

The players, ages 16–20, carried amateur status under Junior A guidelines and hoped to earn a spot on higher levels of junior hockey in the United States and Canada, Canadian Major Junior, Collegiate, and eventually professional teams.

== Season-by-season records ==
| Season | GP | W | L | T | OTL | Pts | GF | GA | Regular season finish | Playoffs |
|---|---|---|---|---|---|---|---|---|---|---|
Atlantic Junior Hockey League
| 2003–04 | No information | | | | | | | | 2nd of 6, AJHL | Lost Semifinal game, 1–3 vs. Washington Jr. Nationals |
| 2004–05 | 41 | 35 | 5 | 0 | 1 | 71 | 247 | 115 | 1st of 4, South; 2nd of 8, AJHL | Won Semifinal game, 11–2 vs. New Jersey Rockets; Lost Championship game, 1–4 vs. Boston Bulldogs |
| 2005–06 | 42 | 35 | 5 | 0 | 2 | 72 | 269 | 138 | 1st of 11, AJHL | Won Quarterfinals, 2–0 vs. Portland Jr. Pirates; Won Semifinal game, 7–4 vs. Hartford Jr. Wolfpack; Won Championship game, 9–6 vs. Boston Bulldogs; League champions |
| 2006–07 | 44 | 36 | 6 | 0 | 2 | 74 | 244 | 141 | 1st of 6, South; 1st of 12, AJHL | League champions |
| 2007–08 | 44 | 28 | 12 | 0 | 4 | 60 | 197 | 150 | 2 of 5, South; 4th of 11, AJHL | |
| 2008–09 | 42 | 34 | 7 | 0 | 1 | 69 | 175 | 106 | 1st of 6, South; 2nd of 12, AJHL | |
| 2009–10 | 42 | 37 | 3 | 0 | 2 | 76 | 212 | 97 | 1st of 6, South; 1st of 12, AJHL | |
| 2010–11 | 44 | 35 | 5 | 0 | 4 | 74 | 231 | 111 | 1st of 6, South; 2nd of 12, AJHL | |
| 2011–12 | 44 | 31 | 12 | 0 | 1 | 63 | 185 | 112 | 3rd of 12, AJHL | |
| 2012–13 | 44 | 24 | 16 | 3 | 1 | 52 | 158 | 153 | 6th of 12, AJHL | Lost Quarterfinals, 0-2 vs. Connecticut Jr. Wolfpack |
Eastern Hockey League
| 2013–14 | 44 | 23 | 15 | 5 | 1 | 52 | 146 | 132 | 2nd of 6, Central Div. 5th of 17, EHL | Won Round 1, 2–0 vs. Boston Junior Rangers; Lost Quarterfinals, 0–2 vs. Boston Bandits |
| 2014–15 | 44 | 26 | 16 | — | 2 | 54 | 156 | 131 | 3rd of 5, Central Div. 7th of 19, EHL | Won Round 1, 2–1 vs. East Coast Wizards; Lost Quarterfinals, 1–2 vs. New Hampshire Jr. Monarchs |
| 2015–16 | 41 | 25 | 12 | — | 4 | 54 | 173 | 121 | 5th of 9, South Conf. 7th of 18, EHL-Premier | Lost First Round, 0–1 vs. Philadelphia Revolution |
| 2016–17 | Inactive in junior hockey | | | | | | | | | |
| 2017–18 | 50 | 4 | 42 | — | 4 | 12 | 92 | 298 | 4th of 4, Central Div. 8th of 8, South Conf. 16th of 16, EHL | Did not qualify |

== Alumni ==
The Bobcats have produced a number of alumni playing in higher levels of junior hockey, NCAA Division I, Division III college and professional programs, including:

- Tim Filangieri - Syracuse Crunch (AHL)
- Louis Liotti - Worcester Sharks (AHL)
- Dinos Stamoulis - Springfield Falcons (AHL)
- Tony Romano - Bridgeport Sound Tigers (AHL), (New Jersey Devils 2005 NHL entry draft)
- Will Bodine - Utah Grizzlies (ECHL)
- James Brannigan - Utah Grizzlies (ECHL)
- Bill Keenan - Lindlövens IF (Swedish Division One)
- Joe Grimaldi - Elmira Jackals (ECHL)
- Vlady Nikiforov - Utah Grizzlies (ECHL)
- Keith Kinkaid - New Jersey Devils (NHL)
- Joey Spagnoli - Elmira Jackals (ECHL), Danbury Whalers (FHL)
