= Connecticut Nor'Easter =

- City: Simsbury, Connecticut
- League: Eastern Hockey League
- Division: Central
- Founded: 1996
- Home arena: International Skating Center of CT
- Colors: Navy, electric blue, silver, and white
- Owner: Adam Westhaver
- General manager: Nielsson Arcibal
- Head coach: Nielsson Arcibal

Franchise history
- 1996–2012: Capital District Selects
- 2012–2018: Connecticut Oilers
- 2018–2024: Connecticut Chiefs
- 2024–present: Connecticut Nor'easter

Championships
- Playoff championships: 2014–15

The Connecticut Nor'easter are a Junior Tier II ice hockey team from Simsbury, Connecticut, playing in the Eastern Hockey League (EHL).

Previously known as the Oilers, the organization also had youth teams, ranging from age groups of 6 to 16-years-old, and competed in the Atlantic Youth Hockey League (AYHL) out of the SoNo Icehouse in Norwalk, Connecticut. However, these teams joined the Connecticut RoughRiders organization when the Oilers relocated to Hamden.

== History ==
The Connecticut Chiefs' logo

The franchise was founded as the Capital District Selects playing out of Troy, New York. After several seasons as an independent midget team, the CD Selects joined the Eastern Junior Hockey League (EJHL) in 1998 as a part-time member, joining full-time in 1999. The team was owned and coached by former RPI coach Jim Salfi. Beginning with the 2002–03 season, the Selects played in the Eastern Junior Hockey League's South Division, until the Boston Junior Shamrocks were sold and moved to Philadelphia which moved the Selects to the North Division.

In 2012, the team was sold and relocated to Norwalk, Connecticut, and renamed the Connecticut Oilers and became affiliated with the United States Hockey League's Cedar Rapids RoughRiders. During the summer of 2013, Tier III junior hockey was drastically reorganized in the north eastern United States resulting in the Oilers moving to the Atlantic Junior Hockey League. On June 6, 2013, the AJHL became the Eastern Hockey League.

The Oilers would have their best season in 2014–15 and won the EHL playoffs and league championship. Winning the league championship would normally qualify the team for the 2015 USA Hockey Tier III National Championships, however due to a clerical error with a pair of the Oilers' import player's paperwork, the runner-up Northern Cyclones represented the EHL. Due to these circumstances, the EHL would later void their playoff championship and claim a "vacant" playoff champion for that season.

After the 2016–17 season, the Oilers relocated to Hamden, Connecticut, when the Cedar Rapids RoughRiders established an EHL expansion team in Norwalk called the Connecticut RoughRiders.

In 2018, the Connecticut Chiefs, a youth hockey organization in Newington, Connecticut, obtained the Oilers' franchise rights and plan to operate the franchise in the EHL during the 2018–19 season.

Due to effects of the COVID-19 pandemic, the junior teams temporarily relocated halfway through the 2020–21 season to West Springfield, Massachusetts, as the Western Mass Chiefs.

In 2024, the Connecticut Nor'easter, obtained the Chiefs' franchise rights and plan to operate the franchise in Simsbury, Connecticut. New owner, Adam Westhaver, announced that both the EHL and the EHPL teams will be active at their new location.

== Season-by-season records ==
Season	GP	W	L	T	OTL	Pts	GF	GA	Regular season finish	Playoffs
Capital District Selects
1999–00	38	21	14	3	—	45	171	133	4th of 11, EJHL	
2000–01	no data								7th EJHL	Lost Quarterfinal game, 2–4 vs. Boston Junior Bruins
2001–02	38	19	14	2	3	43	157	138	4th of 6, South; 7th of 12, EJHL	Lost Quarterfinal game, 1–8 vs. New Hampshire Junior Monarchs
2002–03	38	20	16	2	0	42	141	109	4th of 6, South; 6th of 12, EJHL	Lost Quarterfinals vs. Boston Junior Bruins
2003–04	38	25	11	0	2	52	158	130	1st of 6, South; 3rd of 12, EJHL	Won Quarterfinals vs. Boston Harbor Wolves; Lost Semifinal game, 5–6 vs. New Hampshire Junior Monarchs
2004–05	51	20	24	6	1	47	173	202	4th of 7, South; 8th of 13, EJHL	Won Play-in game, 5–3 vs. New England Junior Huskies; Lost Quarterfinals, 0–2 vs. New Hampshire Junior Monarchs
2005–06	45	16	25	3	1	36	147	184	7th of 7, South; 12th of 14, EJHL	Did not qualify
2006–07	45	16	24	4	1	37	136	163	5th of 7, South; 11th of 14, EJHL	Did not qualify
2007–08	45	19	24	2	0	40	146	149	6th of 7, South; 11th of 14, EJHL	Did not qualify
2008–09	45	8	31	5	1	22	133	234	7th of 7, South; 13th of 14, EJHL	Did not qualify
2009–10	45	9	31	2	3	23	126	228	6th of 7, North; 13th of 14, EJHL	Did not qualify
2010–11	45	6	36	2	1	15	117	251	7th of 7, North; 14th of 14, EJHL	Did not qualify
2011–12	45	1	39	—	5	7	103	283	7th of 7, North; 14th of 14, EJHL	Did not qualify
Connecticut Oilers
2012–13	45	12	28	—	5	29	120	179	6th of 7, South; 12th of 14, EJHL	Lost First Round, 0–2 vs. Valley Jr. Warriors
2013–14	44	26	13	3	2	57	170	121	1st of 6, Central; 4th of 17, EHL	Lost First Round, 1–2 vs. Valley Jr. Warriors
2014–15	44	31	11	1	1	64	183	103	1st of 5, Central; 4th of 19, EHL	Won First Round, 2–0 vs. Boston Junior Rangers; Won Quarterfinals, 2–0 vs.Walpole Express; Won Semifinals, 2–0 vs. Philadelphia Little Flyers; Won Finals, 3–2 vs. Northern Cyclones; League Champions* (voided)
2015–16	41	28	11	—	2	68	159	130	2nd of 9, South Conf. 4th of 18, EHL-Premier	Won First Round, 2–0 vs. New Jersey Rockets; Won Second Round, 2–0 vs. Hartford Jr. Wolfpack; Lost Semifinals, 0–2 vs. New Hampshire Junior Monarchs
2016–17	48	17	27	—	4	38	135	208	1st of 4, Central Div. 5th of 8, South Conf. 14th of 17, EHL-Premier	Lost First Round, 0–2 vs. New York Apple Core
2017–18	50	14	33	—	3	31	118	205	3rd of 4, Central Div. 6th of 8, South Conf. 14th of 16, EHL	Lost First Round, 0–2 vs. Philadelphia Little Flyers
Connecticut Chiefs
2018–19	44	13	28	—	3	29	137	198	5th of 5, South Div. 10th of 10, New England Conf. 16th of 18, EHL	Did not qualify
2019–20	46	14	28	—	4	32	112	182	9th of 11, New England Conf. 15th of 19, EHL	Did not qualify
2020–21	38	17	17	—	4	38	124	138	3rd of 7, Central Div. 9th of 17, EHL	Won First Round, 2–0 vs. Seahawks Hockey Club; Lost Div. Semifinals, 0–2 vs. Walpole Express
2021–22	46	18	23	—	5	41	140	158	2nd of 4, Central Div. 14th of 17, EHL	Won First Round, 2–0 vs. Connecticut Roughriders; Lost Div. Semifinals, 1–2 vs. Worcester Jr. Railers; Lost Wild Cqard Gm 2-3(ot) New Jersey 87's
2022–23	46	15	25	6	0	36	100	136	3rd of 5, Central Div. 17th of 19, EHL	Won Semifinals, 2–1 HC Rhode Island; Lost Div. Semifinals, 1–2 vs. Worcester Jr. Railers
2023–24	46	17	25	3	1	38	124	175	5th of 6, Central Div. 19th of 23, EHL	Won Play In, 1-0 HC Rhode Island; Lost Div Semifinals, 1-2 Worcester Jr. Railers
Connecticut Nor'Easter
2024–25	46	21	22	1	2	45	139	159	3rd of 5, Central Div. 13th of 21, EHL	Lost Div Semifinals, 1-2 HC Rhode Island
2025–26	50	22	25	2	1	47	158	169	3rd of 5, Central Div. 10th of 20, EHL	Won Div Semifinals, 2-1 Providence Capitals; Lost Div Finals 0-2 HC Rhode Island

== Notable alumni ==
- Dave Evans - Clarkson University (Carolina Hurricanes 1999 Draft Pick)
- Ben Guite - University of Maine (Montreal Canadiens 1997 Draft Pick)
- Jay Leach - Providence College (NHL player)
- David Leggio - Clarkson University (TPS Turku SM-liiga player)
- Nick Petrecki - Boston College (San Jose Sharks 2007 1st Round Draft Pick)
- Matthias Trattnig - University of Maine (Chicago Blackhawks 1998 Draft Pick)
- Curtis Valentine - Bowling Green University (Vancouver Canucks 1998 Draft Pick)
- Shawn Weller - Clarkson University (Ottawa Senators 2004 Draft Pick)
- Brian Robbins - UMass - Lowell
