= New Jersey Bears =

- City: Flemington, New Jersey
- League: Eastern Hockey League
- Conference: South
- Founded: 1987
- Home arena: Flemington Ice Arena
- Colors: Brown, gold
- Owners: Michael Golembiewski and Tim Quinn
- General manager: Jason Kilcoyne
- Head coach: Jason Kilcoyne

Franchise history
- 1987–2020: Philadelphia Jr. Flyers
- 2020–2023: Protec Jr. Ducks
- 2023–present: New Jersey Bears

The New Jersey Bears are a USA Hockey-sanctioned Tier III Junior A ice hockey team from Flemington, New Jersey. They play in the South Conference of the Eastern Hockey League (EHL). For the 2024-25 season the Bears are adding a team to the Premier (EHLP).

The players, ages 16–20, carry amateur status under Junior A guidelines and hope to earn a spot on higher levels of junior hockey in the United States and Canada, Canadian major junior, collegiate, and eventually professional teams.

== History ==
The Philadelphia Junior Flyers' logo

The Philadelphia Jr. Flyers were members of the Atlantic Junior Hockey League (AJHL) from 2008 until 2013 when Tier III junior hockey leagues went through a reorganization, which included the AJHL re-branding itself as the Eastern Hockey League (EHL). In 2015, the EHL added a lower level of Tier III junior hockey for player development called the EHL-Elite Division and all the current EHL members, including the Jr. Flyers, were added to the EHL-Premier Division. In 2017, the league re-branded, dropping the Premier name from their top division and renamed the Elite Division to Premier.

The organization currently fields a team at the former Tier III Junior B level in the EHL Premier (and formerly in the Metropolitan Junior Hockey League). It also currently fields youth hockey select teams at the Midget U18, Midget 16U, Bantam, Peewee, and Squirt and Mite levels.

The Jr. Flyers 18 and under team won the silver medal in the 2010 USA Hockey National Tournament in Chicago, Illinois.

Prior to the start of the 2020-21 season the Jr. Flyers were sold and became the Protec Jr. Ducks. Then prior to the start of the 2022-23 season the franchise was sold once more, moved to Flemington, New Jersey and became the New Jersey Bears. The Bears were approved to add an expansion team to the EHL's Premier division the following year.

== Season-by-season records ==
Season	GP	W	L	T	OTL	SOL	Pts	GF	GA	Regular season finish	Playoffs
Philadelphia Jr. Flyers
Atlantic Junior Hockey League
2008–09	42	19	20	0	3	—	41	124	148	4th of 6, South; 8th of 12, AJHL	
2009–10	42	20	19	0	3	—	43	141	145	3rd of 6, South; 6th of 12, AJHL	
2010–11	44	19	23	0	2	—	40	142	172	4th of 6, South; 9th of 12, AJHL	
2011–12	44	23	16	5	0	—	51	179	144	5th of 12, AJHL	
2012–13	44	16	21	5	2	—	39	117	121	8th of 12, AJHL	Lost Quarterfinals, 0–2 vs. Northern Cyclones
Eastern Hockey League
2013–14	44	19	18	7	0	—	45	113	107	3rd of 6, South Div. 10th of 17, EHL	Lost First Round series, 0–2 (Wilkes-Barre/Scranton Knights)
2014–15	44	23	19	—	2	—	48	124	122	2nd of 5, South Div. 9th of 19, EHL	Lost First Round series, 0–2 (Hartford Jr. Wolfpack)
2015–16	41	19	15	—	7	—	45	134	129	6th of 9, South Conf. 10th of 18, EHL-Premier	Lost Conf. Quarterfinal series, 1–2 (Hartford Jr. Wolfpack)
2016–17	48	36	8	—	4	—	76	163	88	2nd of 4, Mid-Atlantic Div. 2nd of 8, South Conf. 2nd of 17, EHL-Premier	Won Conf. Quarterfinal series, 2–0 (Hartford Jr. Wolfpack); Won Quarterfinal series, 2–1 (East Coast Wizards); Won Semifinal series, 2–0 (New Hampshire Junior Monarchs); Won Championship, 3–2 (Philadelphia Little Flyers)
2017–18	50	12	32	—	6	—	30	98	187	4th of 4, Mid-Atlantic Div. 7th of 8, South Conf. 15th of 16, EHL	Did not qualify
2018–19	46	20	22	—	4	—	44	160	172	3rd of 5, South Div. 5th of 8, Mid-Atlantic Conf. 11th of 18, EHL	Lost First Round series, 0–2 (Philadelphia Revolution)
2019–20	46	19	26	—	1	—	39	112	126	6th of 8, Mid-Atlantic Conf. 13th of 19, EHL	Won First Round series, 2–1 (Connecticut RoughRiders); Remainder of postseason cancelled
Protec Jr. Ducks
2020–21	38	17	15	—	6	—	40	133	154	3rd of 6, South Div. 7th of 18, EHL	Won Div. Quarterfinal series, 2–1 (New York Apple Core); Lost Div. Semifinal series, 0–2 (Philadelphia Little Flyers)
2021–22	46	25	16	—	5	—	55	147	144	3rd of 4, South Div. 7th of 17, EHL	Lost Div. Semifinal series, 0–2 (New Jersey 87's)
2022–23	46	27	14	—	4	0	58	140	130	t-1st of 5, South Div. t-6th of 19, EHL	Lost Div. Semifinal series, 1–2 (Team Maryland)
New Jersey Bears
2023–24	46	29	12	—	4	1	63	148	110	1st of 6, South Div; 7th of 23, EHL	Lost Semifinal, 0–2 (Philadelphia Little Flyers)
2024–25	46	32	10	—	0	4	68	195	122	1st of 5, South Div; 5th of 21, EHL	Lost Semifinal, 0–2 (Philadelphia Hockey Club)
2025–26	50	31	15	—	2	2	66	179	124	3rd of 5, South Div; 7th of 20, EHL	Won Semifinal, 2-0 (New Jersey 87's); Won Div Finals 2-1 (Philadelphia Hockey Club); Won League Semifinals 2-0 (HC Rhode Island); Won League Finals 2-1 (Seahawks Hockey Club)

== Alumni ==
The Junior Flyers have produced a number of alumni playing in higher levels of junior hockey, NCAA Division I, Division III, ACHA college and professional programs, including:

- Jeff Corey - Ontario Reign (ECHL)
- Ed DeWald- Mercyhurst- NCAA D1
- Orel Hershiser - Played for the Junior Flyers before attending Bowling Green State University and a career in Major League Baseball.
- Tyler Hostetter - Adirondack Phantoms (AHL)
- Eric Knodel Toronto Maple Leafs 2009 NHL Entry Draft - Toronto Marlies (AHL)
- Vince Malts Vancouver Canucks 1998 NHL Entry Draft - Amstel Tijgers (Eredivisie
- David Moccia - Adirondack Frostbite (UHL), Asst Coach SUNYAC Plattsburgh (SUNYAC)
- Ryan Mulhern Calgary Flames 1992 NHL Entry Draft - Washington Capitals (NHL)
- John Murray - Johnstown Chiefs (ECHL)
- Eric Tangradi Anaheim Ducks 2007 NHL Entry Draft - Pittsburgh Penguins (NHL), Wilkes-Barre/Scranton Penguins (AHL)
