= Boston Dogs =

- City: Canton, Massachusetts
- League: United States Premier Hockey League; National Collegiate Development Conference
- Conference: New England
- Division: Eastern
- Founded: 2023 (EHL)
- Home arena: Canton Sportsplex
- Colors: Scarlet and white
- Head coach: Cody Gonyeau

Franchise history
- 2023–2024: Boston Junior Terriers
- 2024–present: Boston Dogs

The Boston Dogs are a Tier II junior ice hockey team playing in the United States Premier Hockey League at the National Collegiate Development Conference (top) level. The Dogs play their home games at the Canton Sportsplex in Canton, Massachusetts.

== History ==
The parent organization, Boston Junior Terriers, was founded in 1982 as a youth development club for the greater Boston area. The Jr. Terriers oversee more than 800 players across multiple age groups for minor ice hockey and operate out of two facilities in Canton and Rockland. After more than 40 years in operation, the Junior Terriers finally joined the Tier III level when they were one of three expansion teams announced by the Eastern Hockey League in 2022. After a solid first season, the organization decided to switch affiliations and join the United States Premier Hockey League for the 2025–26 season. However, after the club made the announcement, they were expelled from the EHL in the middle of the season. The USPHL responded by accepting the club immediately and rearranged the schedule to include the newly-rechristened 'Boston Dogs'. The Dogs did not play particularly well in their partial season, finishing last in the league with 22 points, albeit in more than 20 fewer games.

== Season-by-season records ==
Season	GP	W	L	OTL	SOL	Pts	GF	GA	Regular season finish	Playoffs
Eastern Hockey League
2023–24	46	22	20	3	1	48	129	121	4th of 6, East Div. t–12th of 23, EHL	Lost Div. Qualifier, 4–6 (Seahawks Hockey Club)
2024–25 ^{†}	15	11	4	0	0	22	53	22	—	—
United States Premier Hockey League
2024–25 ^{†}	31	10	19	2	0	22	89	116	9th of 9, New England Div. 22nd of 22, USPHL	did not qualify
2025–26	54	15	30	6	3	39	134	200	5th of 6, New England East; 27th of 33, NCDC	did not qualify

† expelled from EHL in November, joined USPHL.
