= Worcester Jr. Railers =

- City: Worcester, Massachusetts
- League: United States Premier Hockey League; National Collegiate Development Conference
- Conference: New England
- Division: Central
- Founded: 2019
- Home arena: Fidelity Bank Worcester Ice Center
- Colors: Steel blue, gray, white
- Head coach: Sean Bertoni
- Affiliates: Worcester Jr. Railers (Tier III)

Franchise history
- 2019–present: Worcester Jr. Railers

Championships
- Regular season titles: 1: 2024
- Division titles: 3: 2022, 2023, 2024
- Playoff championships: 1: 2024

The Worcester Jr. Railers Hockey Club are a Tier II junior ice hockey team playing in the National Collegiate Development Conference (NCDC) of the United States Premier Hockey League (USPHL). The organization operates several other teams at varying levels of play with two others in the USPHL's Premier and Elite divisions that are also called Worcester Jr. Railers.

== History ==
After the foundation of the Worcester Railers in 2016, the club began to sponsor a junior program a few years later. The Worcester Jr. Railers founded a Tier II club in 2019 and began play in the Eastern Hockey League. The Jr. Railers soon became one of the top teams in the league and won the championship in 2024.

After five years in operation, the Jr. Railers left the EHL and transferred all of their clubs to the United States Premier Hockey League. The Tier II club joined the National Collegiate Development Conference.

== Season-by-season records ==
Season	GP	W	L	OTL	SOL	Pts	GF	GA	Regular season finish	Playoffs
EHL
2019–20	46	7	36	3	–	17	111	240	11th of 11, New England Conf. 18th of 19, EHL	Did not qualify
2020–21	38	18	20	0	–	36	116	144	t-4th of 7, Central Div. t-10th of 18, EHL	Won Div. Quarterfinal series, 2–1 (East Coast Wizards); Lost Div. Semifinal series, 0–2 (Boston Junior Rangers)
2021–22	46	28	15	3	–	59	163	139	1st of 4, Central Div. 5th of 19, EHL	Won Div. Semifinal series, 2–1 (New York Apple Core); Won Div. Final series, 2–0 (Boston Junior Rangers); Won Pool B Round-Robin, 4–0 (Philadelphia Little Flyers), 4–2 (New Jersey 87's); Lost Semifinal, 1–3 (Walpole Express)
2022–23	46	30	14	0	2	62	151	102	1st of 5, Central Div. 3rd of 19, EHL	Won Div. Semifinal series, 2–0 (Connecticut RoughRiders); Won Div. Final series, 2–1 (Connecticut Chiefs); Lost Semifinal series, 1–2 (Boston Junior Rangers)
2023–24	46	36	8	2	0	74	190	86	1st of 6, Central Div. 1st of 23, EHL	Won Div. Semifinal series, 2–0 (Connecticut Chiefs); Won Div. Final series, 2–1 (New York Apple Core); Won Semifinal series, 2–1 (Philadelphia Little Flyers); Won Championship, 6–0 (Boston Junior Rangers)
NCDC
2024–25	54	24	25	3	0	53	156	190	5th of 9, New England Div. 13th of 22, NCDC	Won Div. Qualifier series, 1–2 (Islanders Hockey Club); Lost Div. Semifinal series, 0–3 (South Shore Kings)
25–26	54	34	18	2	0	70	209	143	3rd of 6, New England Central; 11th of 33, NCDC	Won Div. Semifinal 3-0 (Boston Junior Rangers); Lost Div. Final, 1–3 (Utica Jr. Comets)
