= Boston Junior Rangers =

- City: Tewksbury, Massachusetts
- League: United States Premier Hockey League (USPHL); National Collegiate Development Conference (NCDC)
- Conference: New England
- Division: Central
- Founded: 2004
- Home arena: Breakaway Ice Center
- Colors: Blue, white and red
- Owner: Mike Sorabella
- General manager: Rich DeCaprio
- Head coach: Rich DeCaprio
- Affiliates: Boston Junior Rangers (Tier III)

Franchise history
- 2004–2012: Boston Bulldogs
- 2012–Present: Boston Junior Rangers

Championships
- Regular season titles: 2: 2020, 2022
- Division titles: 3: 2018, 2021, 2022
- Conference titles: 1: 2020
- Playoff championships: 2: 2021, 2023

The Boston Junior Rangers (aka Boston Jr. Rangers) are a Tier II junior ice hockey team playing in the United States Premier Hockey League's (USPHL) National Collegiate Development Conference (NCDC) division. The Jr. Rangers play their home games at Breakaway Ice Center in Tewksbury, Massachusetts.

== History ==
Formed in 2008, the Boston Junior Rangers organization has supported several levels of youth hockey in Worcester, Massachusetts. The group operated exclusively at the younger levels of hockey development until 2012 when Mike Addesa sold the Boston Bulldogs franchise to the Junior Rangers. The team was relocated and began playing out of the Worcester Ice Center the following year. The newly rechristened 'Boston Junior Rangers' continued in the Atlantic Junior Hockey League for one season before junior hockey saw a reshuffling. The league merged with the Eastern Junior Hockey League to form the Eastern Hockey League with the Rangers continued in the larger league. After two seasons, the EHL founded a second tier and renamed their levels of play as Premier (1st) and Elite (2nd). The Junior Rangers formed a second tier club and operated both concurrently. The league renamed the tiers in 2017 with the top level simply being called 'EHL' and the second tier 'EHL Premier'. Other than the naming, no changes were made to the league's structure.

The Junior Rangers began to see some success in 2016 when then won their first playoff series and then captured their first Division title the following year. After relocating to Tewksbury, Massachusetts, Boston was able to overcome the disruptions caused by the COVID-19 pandemic and win the EHL championship in 2021. The club remained a fixture as one of the EHL's top clubs for the next several years, winning a second title in 2023 and just falling short of a third in 2024.

In 2024, the Boston Junior Rangers and Worcester Jr. Railers agreed to a partnership and arrangement. The two clubs would leave the EHL and join the United States Premier Hockey League. As both organizations had teams in the EHL's two divisions, their former EHL franchises would join the National Collegiate Development Conference (Tier II) while the EHL Premier teams would become members of USPHL Premier (Tier III). Additionally, the two would jointly operate a further club in USPHL's Elite Division with potential future teams being added by joint decision.

== Season-by-season records ==
Season	GP	W	L	T	OTL	SOL	Pts	GF	GA	Regular season finish	Playoffs
AJHL
2012–13	44	22	11	9	2	-	55	135	106	5th of 12, AJHL	Lost Quarterfinal series, 0–2 (Wilkes-Barre/Scranton Knights)
EHL
2013–14	44	18	21	2	3	-	41	120	149	4th of 5, North Div. 12th of 17, EHL	Lost First Round series, 0–2 (New York Bobcats)
2014–15	44	18	22	-	1	3	40	122	128	4th of 5, Boston Div. 13th of 19, EHL	Lost First Round series, 0–2 (Connecticut Oilers)
EHL Premier
2015–16	41	18	19	-	4	-	40	124	124	5th of 9, Northern Conf. 12th of 18, EHLP	Lost Conf. Quarterfinal series, 0–2 (Walpole Express)
2016–17	48	28	17	-	3	-	59	140	135	2nd of 5, Boston Div. 3rd of 9, Northern Conf. 6th of 17, EHLP	Won Conf. Quarterfinal series, 2–1 (Vermont Lumberjacks); Lost Conf. Semifinal series, 1–2 (New Jersey Rockets)
EHL
2017–18	50	38	11	-	1	-	77	197	114	1st of 4, Boston Div. 2nd of 8, Northern Conf. 4th of 17, EHL	Won Conf. Semifinal series, 2–0 (Walpole Express); Lost Frozen Finals Round-Robin, 3–4 (OT) (Philadelphia Little Flyers), 0–4 (Philadelphia Revolution), 4–7 (New Hampshire Avalanche)
2018–19	46	27	15	-	4	-	58	170	115	3rd of 5, North Div. 4th of 10, New England Conf. t-6th of 18, EHL	Won Conf. Quarterfinal series, 2–0 (Seahawks Hockey Club); Lost Conf. Semifinal series, 0–2 (New Hampshire Avalanche)
2019–20	46	39	5	-	2	-	80	208	104	1st of 11, New England Conf. 1st of 19, EHL	Postseason cancelled
2020–21	38	32	5	-	1	-	65	168	77	1st of 7, Central Div. 2nd of 18, EHL	Won Div. Semifinal series, 2–0 (Worcester Jr. Railers); Won Div. Final series, 2–0 (Walpole Express); Won Frozen Finals Round-Robin, 3–5 (Lumberjacks Hockey Club), 5–3 (New Jersey 87's), 2–1 (New Hampshire Avalanche); Won Frozen Finals Championship, 3–2 (OT) (New Hampshire Avalanche)
2021–22	46	34	9	-	3	-	71	150	84	1st of 5, East Div. 1st of 17, EHL	Won Div. Semifinal series, 2–0 (Seahawks Hockey Club); Lost Div. Final series, 0–2 (Walpole Express); Lost Wild Card qualifier, 1–2 (OT) (New England Wolves)
2022–23	46	29	15	-	2	1	60	145	100	2nd of 5, East Div. 5th of 19, EHL	Won Div. Semifinal series, 2–0 (Seahawks Hockey Club); Won Div. Final series, 2–1 (Express Hockey Club); Won Frozen Finals Semifinal series, 2–1 (Worcester Jr. Railers); Won Frozen Finals Championship, 4–2 (New Hampshire Avalanche)
2023–24	46	32	13	-	0	1	65	185	105	2nd of 6, East Conf. 5th of 23, EHL	Won Div. Semifinal series, 2–0 (East Coast Wizards); Won Div. Final series, 2–1 (Express Hockey Club); Won Frozen Finals Semifinal series, 2–1 (New Hampshire Avalanche); Lost Frozen Finals Championship, 0–6 (Worcester Jr. Railers)
NCDC
2024–25	54	15	38	-	6	4	31	149	216	7th of 9, New England Div. 18th of 22, NCDC	Did not qualify
2025–26	54	36	13	-	3	2	77	209	160	2nd of 6, New England Center; 7th of 33, NCDC	Lost Div Semifinals 0-2 (Worcester Jr. Railers)
