= Philadelphia Hockey Club =

- City: Sewell, New Jersey
- League: Eastern Hockey League
- Division: South
- Founded: 2017
- Home arena: Hollydell Ice Arena
- Colors: Blue, red and white
- General manager: Adam Bartholomay
- Head coach: Adam Bartholomay

Franchise history
- 2017–2020: Boston Bandits
- 2020–present: Philadelphia Hockey Club

The Philadelphia Hockey Club are a Tier II junior ice hockey team that is currently a member of the Eastern Hockey League. Philadelphia plays its home games at the Hollydell Ice Arena in Sewell, New Jersey.

== History ==
Boston Bandits logo

In 2017, the Boston Bandits organization left the EHL for the United States Premier Hockey League (USPHL). The main reason for this was that the USPHL was in the process of establishing a new Tier II level of play that was named the National Collegiate Development Conference (NCDC). The Bandits founded a new Tier II franchise upon their entry into the league while the existing clubs joined the Premier (Tier III) and Elite (lower) Divisions.

The organization was then sold to Scott Harlow in December 2019, after which the Bandits NCDC franchise was sold to the Philadelphia Hockey Club prior to the 2020–21 season.

Philadelphia then played two more seasons in the NCDC before being forcibly removed from the league in the spring of 2022. PHC then joined the Eastern Hockey League, which had founded its own Tier II level in the interim, and remained a Tier II franchise.

== Season-by-season records ==
| Season | GP | W | L | OTL | SOL | Pts | GF | GA | Regular season finish | Playoffs |
|---|---|---|---|---|---|---|---|---|---|---|
National Collegiate Development Conference
Boston Bandits
| 2017–18 | 50 | 20 | 26 | 4 | — | 44 | 154 | 175 | 8th of 11, NCDC | Lost Quarterfinal series, 0–2 (Islanders Hockey Club) |
| 2018–19 | 50 | 26 | 18 | 2 | 4 | 58 | 153 | 149 | 7th of 12, NCDC | Lost Quarterfinal series, 0–2 (Boston Junior Bruins) |
| 2019–20 | 50 | 25 | 17 | 4 | 4 | 58 | 196 | 182 | 7th of 13, NCDC | Playoffs cancelled |
Philadelphia Hockey Club
| 2020–21 | 40 | 10 | 27 | 1 | 2 | 23 | 101 | 168 | 6th of 6, South Div. 13th of 13, NCDC | Lost Div. Quarterfinal series, 0–2 (P.A.L. Jr. Islanders) |
| 2021–22 | 44 | 23 | 18 | 7 | 1 | 54 | 147 | 161 | 3rd of 6, South Div. t-5th of 13, NCDC | Lost Div. Semifinal series, 0–2 (Rockets Hockey Club) |
Eastern Hockey League
| 2022–23 | 46 | 20 | 22 | 3 | 1 | 44 | 139 | 141 | t-4th of 5, South Div. t-12th of 19, EHL | Lost Div. Qualifier, 1–7 (Team Maryland) |
| 2023–24 | 46 | 17 | 24 | 2 | 3 | 39 | 108 | 146 | 5th of 6, South Div. 18th of 23, EHL | Lost Div. Qualifier, 2–5 (Philadelphia Little Flyers) |
| 2024–25 | 46 | 21 | 22 | 3 | 0 | 45 | 140 | 149 | 5th of 6, South Div. t-12th of 21, EHL | Won Div. Semifinal series, 2–0 (New Jersey Bears); Lost Div. Final series, 1–2 (New Jersey 87's) |
| 2025–26 | 50 | 40 | 6 | 2 | 2 | 84 | 225 | 90 | 1st of 5, South Div. 2nd of 20, EHL | Won Div. Semifinal series, 2–0 (Philadelphia Little Flyers); Lost Div. Final series, 1–2 (New Jersey Bears) |
