= Philadelphia Revolution =

- City: Warwick Township, Pennsylvania
- League: Eastern Hockey League
- Conference: East
- Founded: 1993
- Folded: 2020
- Home arena: Revolution Ice Gardens
- Colors: Red, Gray, White, and Black
- General manager: Chris Kanaly
- Head coach: Alex Ufberg

Franchise history
- 1993–1995: Matt O'Neil Hockey Club
- 1995–1998: Matt O'Neil Lightning
- 1998–2007: Boston Harbor Wolves
- 2007–2009: Boston Jr. Shamrocks
- 2009–2020: Philadelphia Revolution

The Philadelphia Revolution were a Tier III Junior A ice hockey team in the Eastern Hockey League. The team played home games at Revolution Ice Gardens (formerly The Rink at Warwick), in Warwick Township, Pennsylvania, a suburb of Philadelphia. The team continues to play for Philadelphia furthermore, currently the team is registered under the Tier 1 Hockey Federation, an AAA league.

== History ==
The Revolution joined the Eastern Junior Hockey League (EJHL) for the 2009–10 season after the owners of the Tier III Junior B Tri-State Selects of the Empire Junior Hockey League (EmJHL) purchased the Boston Jr. Shamrocks EJHL franchise. The organization would become the Philadelphia Revolution and field Tier III teams in the Junior A EJHL, Junior B EmJHL, and the Junior B Eastern States Hockey League (ESHL).

In 2013, Tier III junior hockey leagues underwent a reorganization that led to the dissolution of the EJHL. The Revolution joined the Atlantic Junior Hockey League which then re-branded itself as the Eastern Hockey League (EHL). The Revolution organization also field teams at the U19 Elite Level, the U16 Elite Level in the Elite Prospects League. Their former Junior B team in the EmJHL began playing in the Metropolitan Junior Hockey League (MJHL) after the EmJHL joined the United States Premier Hockey League in 2013. The MJHL Revolution team then joined the EHL-19U Elite Division in 2016. They dropped their Junior B ESHL team when that league disbanded in the 2013 reorganization. In 2017, the EHL re-branded again, dropping the Premier name from their top division and renamed the Elite Division to Premier.

The team was removed from the EHL website prior to the 2020-21 season and appeared to drop all junior level teams. The organization was still running youth hockey teams through the midget level. The team resides in the THF now and supports many age groups of youth hockey subsequent to 2023.

== Season-by-season records ==
Season	GP	W	L	T	OTL	Pts	GF	GA	Regular season finish	Playoffs
Matt O'Neil Hockey Club/Lightning
1993–97	No information								EJHL	
1997–98	37	4	33	0	—	8	79	259	8th of 8, EJHL	
Boston Harbor Wolves
1998–99	37	1	36	0	—	2	78	241	8th of 8, EJHL	
1999–00	40	9	29	2	—	20	135	195	10th of 11, EJHL	
2000–01	No information								EJHL	did not qualify
2001–02	38	6	32	0	0	12	77	200	6th of 6, North; 12th of 12, EJHL	did not qualify
2002–03	38	12	24	1	1	26	129	172	4th of 6, North; 9th of 12, EJHL	Lost Quarterfinals vs. New York Apple Core
2003–04	38	14	22	2	0	30	107	141	4th of 6, North; 8th of 12, EJHL	Lost Quarterfinals vs. Capital District Selects
2004–05	52	7	41	1	3	18	92	222	6th of 6, North; 13th of 13, EJHL	did not qualify
2005–06	45	7	33	2	3	19	102	197	7th of 7, North; 14th of 14, EJHL	did not qualify
2006–07	45	2	36	3	4	11	96	241	7th of 7, North; 14th of 14, EJHL	did not qualify
Boston Jr. Shamrocks
2007–08	44	3	40	1	0	7	62	252	7th of 7, North; 14th of 14, EJHL	did not qualify
2008–09	45	7	36	1	1	16	111	273	7th of 7, North; 14th of 14, EJHL	did not qualify
Philadelphia Revolution
2009–10	45	8	29	6	2	24	131	227	7th of 7, South; 12th of 14, EJHL	did not qualify
2010–11	45	12	23	6	4	34	135	212	6th of 7, South; 9th of 14, EJHL	Lost First Round, 0–2 vs. Valley Jr. Warriors
2011—12	45	12	32	0	1	25	113	205	7th of 7, South; 13th of 14, EJHL	did not qualify
2012–13	45	6	38	—	1	13	61	201	7th of 7, South; 14th of 14, EJHL	did not qualify
2013–14	44	19	23	2	0	40	124	158	4th of 6, South; 13th of 17, EHL	Lost First Round, 0–2 vs. Northern Cyclones
2014–15	44	8	32	—	4	20	87	176	5th of 5, South; 19th of 19, EHL	did not qualify
2015–16	41	26	12	—	3	55	138	102	4th of 5, South Conf. 6th of 18, EHL-Premier	Won First Round, 2–0 vs. New York Bobcats; Lost Second Round, 0–2 vs. Philadelphia Little Flyers
2016–17	48	31	14	—	3	65	180	120	3rd of 4, Mid-Atlantic Div. 3rd of 8, South Conf. 5th of 17, EHL-Premier	Lost First Round, 0–2 vs. New Jersey Rockets
2017–18	50	41	8	—	1	83	234	99	1st of 4, Mid-Atlantic Div. 1st of 8, South Conf. 1st of 16, EHL	First Round bye Won Second Round, 2–0 vs. New York Apple Core; 2–1–0 in Frozen Finals round-robin (L, 1–3 vs. Avalanche; W, 4–0 vs. Jr. Rangers; W, 3–0 vs. Little Flyers); Lost Championship game, 2–3 vs. New Hampshire Avalanche
2018–19	44	27	15	—	2	56	190	117	2nd of 5, South Div. 4th of 8, Mid-Atlantic Conf. 8th of 18, EHL	Won First Round, 2–0 vs. Philadelphia Jr. Flyers; Lost Second Round, 0–2 vs. Philadelphia Little Flyers
2019–20	46	30	12	—	4	64	192	117	2nd of 8, Mid-Atlantic Conf. 5th of 19, EHL	First Round bye Playoffs cancelled
