= Valley Jr. Warriors =

- City: Haverhill, Massachusetts
- League: Eastern Hockey League
- Division: North
- Founded: 1996 (EJHL); 2019 (EHLP)
- Home arena: Haverhill Valley Forum
- Colors: Navy, gold and white
- Head coach: Sean Collins (EHL); Ryan McGrath (EHLP)

Championships
- Division titles: 1 (EHL): 2017

The Valley Jr. Warriors are a pair of Tier III junior ice hockey teams playing in the Eastern Hockey League (EHL). The Warriors play their home games at the Haverhill Valley Forum in Haverhill, Massachusetts.

== History ==
The Valley Jr. Warriors were originally founded as a member of the Eastern Junior Hockey League (EJHL) in 1996. The team saw a modest amount of success in the league, making several postseason appearances over the years. In 2013, several league members announced that they were leaving to form a separate junior league. The remaining teams, which included Valley, dissolved the EJHL and formed a new circuit called the Eastern Hockey League (EHL). After a few years, the league augmented its structure by adding a lower level for under-19 players that would serve as a feeder system for the primary clubs that operated at full junior level (under-20). Valley's second team was founded in 2015 in what was then called the elite division while the main club operated in the Premier league. After a bit of rearranging, the top level reverted to being called 'Eastern Hockey League' (EHL) while the second tier became 'Eastern Hockey League Premier' (EHLP). Both teams continue to operate in their respective levels as of 2025.

== Season-by-season records ==
=== Primary ===
Season	GP	W	L	T	OTL	SOL	Pts	GF	GA	Regular season finish	Playoffs
Eastern Junior Hockey League
1996–97	42	19	19	4	–	–	42	178	175	5th of 8, EJHL	information missing
1997–98	37	20	14	3	–	–	43	177	141	5th of 8, EJHL	information missing
1998–99	37	14	22	1	–	–	29	158	176	6th of 8, EJHL	information missing
1999–2000	39	21	16	2	–	–	44	187	167	6th of 11, EJHL	information missing
2000–01	information missing									6th of 12, EJHL	Won Quarterfinal, 5–3 (New York Apple Core); Lost Semifinal, 3–4 (Walpole Stars)
2001–02	38	20	15	1	2	–	43	164	158	3rd of 6, North Div. 6th of 12, EJHL	Lost Quarterfinal, 2–5 (New England Jr. Coyotes)
2002–03	38	5	27	2	4	–	16	77	180	6th of 6, North Div. 12th of 12, EJHL	Did not qualify
2003–04	38	5	29	1	3	–	14	91	203	5th of 6, North Div. 11th of 12, EJHL	Did not qualify
2004–05	54	31	17	3	3	–	68	178	163	3rd of 6, North Div. 3rd of 13, EJHL	Won Quarterfinal series, ? (New York Apple Core); Lost Semifinal, 3–7 (New Hampshire Jr. Monarchs)
2005–06	45	22	16	5	2	–	51	164	164	4th of 7, North Div. t–4th of 14, EJHL	Lost Quarterfinal series, 0–2 (New England Jr. Falcons)
2006–07	45	20	19	5	1	–	46	154	188	4th of 7, North Div. 7th of 14, EJHL	Lost Quarterfinal series, ? (Bay State Breakers)
2007–08	46	18	23	3	2	–	41	138	147	4th of 7, North Div. 9th of 14, EJHL	Lost Play-in, 5–7 (New England Jr. Huskies)
2008–09	45	12	25	3	5	–	32	140	187	6th of 7, North Div. 12th of 14, EJHL	Did not qualify
2009–10	45	17	24	4	0	–	38	143	185	5th of 7, North Div. 9th of 14, EJHL	Did not qualify
2010–11	45	17	24	2	2	–	38	153	178	3rd of 7, North Div. 7th of 14, EJHL	Won First Round series, 2–0 (Philadelphia Revolution); Lost Quarterfinal series, 0–2 (New Hampshire Jr. Monarchs)
2011–12	45	27	16	0	2	–	56	160	119	3rd of 7, North Div. 5th of 14, EJHL	Won First Round series, 1–0–1 (New York Apple Core); Lost Quarterfinal series, 0–2 (Jersey Hitmen)
2012–13	45	29	15	–	2	–	59	157	117	3rd of 7, North Div. 5th of 14, EJHL	Won Play-in series, 2–0 (Connecticut Oilers); Won Quarterfinal series, 2–0 (South Shore Kings); Lost Semifinal series, 0–2 (Islanders Hockey Club)
Eastern Hockey League
2013–14	44	16	20	3	5	–	40	121	146	5th of 5, North Div. 14th of 17, EHL	Won First Round series, 2–1 (Connecticut Oilers); Lost Quarterfinal series, 0–2 (New Hampshire Jr. Monarchs)
2014–15	44	16	27	–	0	1	33	105	141	5th of 5, Boston Div. 16th of 19, EHL	Lost First Round series, 0–2 (Philadelphia Little Flyers)
2015–16	41	18	21	–	2	–	38	109	133	6th of 9, North Conf. 13th of 18, EHL	Lost Conf. Quarterfinal series, 1–2 (Northern Cyclones)
2016–17	48	31	13	–	3	–	67	178	127	1st of 5, Boston Div. 2nd of 9, North Conf. 4th of 17, EHL	Lost Conf. Quarterfinal series, 1–2 (East Coast Wizards)
2017–18	50	15	31	–	4	–	34	131	191	4th of 4, New England Div. t–7th of 8, North Conf. t–12th of 16, EHL	Did not qualify
2018–19	44	16	21	–	7	–	39	146	202	4th of 5, North Div. 8th of 10, New England Conf. 13th of 18, EHL	Did not qualify
2019–20	46	13	31	–	2	–	28	123	186	10th of 11, New England Conf. 17th of 19, EHL	Did not qualify
2020–21	38	10	26	–	2	–	22	105	151	7th of 7, Central Div. 16th of 17, EHL	Lost Div. Quarterfinal series, 0–2 (Walpole Express)
2021–22	46	18	21	–	7	–	43	140	158	t–3rd of 5, East Div. t–11th of 17, EHL	Lost Div. Qualifier, 2–3 (OT) (Seahawks Hockey Club)
2022–23	46	17	25	–	3	1	38	109	150	5th of 5, East Div. t–15th of 19, EHL	Lost Div. Qualifier, 4–8 (East Coast Wizards)
2023–24	46	17	21	–	6	2	42	134	163	4th of 5, North Div. 15th of 23, EHL	Lost Div. Semifinal series, 1–2 (New Hampshire Avalanche)
2024–25	46	13	26	–	7	0	33	102	162	4th of 5, North Div. 16th of 20, EHL	Lost Div. Semifinal series, 0–2 (New Hampshire Avalanche)
2025–26	50	14	34	–	1	1	30	123	239	4th of 5, North Div. 14th of 20, EHL	Lost Div. Semifinal series, 0–2 (East Coast Wizards)

=== EHLP ===
Season	GP	W	L	OTL	SOL	Pts	GF	GA	Regular season finish	Playoffs
2015–16	42	10	29	3	–	23	122	218	7th of 8, EHLP	Lost Round Robin Pool B, 3–9 (Boston Jr. Rangers), 10–5 (New England Wolves), 1–3 (Walpole Express)
2016–17	42	25	14	3	–	53	194	143	4th of 8, North Conf. 6th of 15, EHLP	Lost Conf. First Round, 1–4 (New England Wolves)
2017–18	44	12	28	4	–	28	96	158	4th of 5, North Conf. t–9th of 13, EHLP	Lost Conf. First Round, 1–2 (OT) (New England Wolves)
2018–19	41	8	29	4	–	20	100	252	6th of 6, North Conf. 12th of 12, EHLP	Did not qualify
2019–20	42	4	37	1	–	9	86	274	8th of 8, New England Conf. 12th of 13, EHLP	Did not qualify
2020–21	36	7	28	1	–	15	75	167	5th of 5, Central Div. 11th of 12, EHLP	Won Play-in, 3–2 (Western Mass Chiefs); Lost Div. Semifinal series, 0–2 (Boston Jr. Rangers)
2021–22	42	22	18	2	–	46	132	129	3rd of 5, North Div. 7th of 13, EHLP	Lost Div. Semifinal series, 0–2 (Vermont Lumberjacks)
2022–23	42	19	17	3	3	44	126	149	3rd of 5, Central Div. 9th of 15, EHLP	Lost Div. Semifinal series, 0–2 (Railers Jr. Hockey Club)
2023–24	42	27	11	3	1	58	174	101	4th of 6, Boston Div. 7th of 16, EHLP	Won Div. Quarterfinal series, 2–1 (Seahawks Hockey Club); Lost Div. Semifinal series, 0–2 (Railers Jr. Hockey Club)
2024–25	42	23	15	4	0	50	167	128	4th of 5, North Div. 7th of 16, EHLP	Lost Div. Quarterfinal series, 2–0 (Vermont Lumberjacks)
