= Express Hockey Club =

- City: Walpole, Massachusetts
- League: Eastern Hockey League; EHL Premier; EWHC
- Division: East
- Founded: 2005
- Home arena: Cadillac Ice Arena
- Colors: Red, white, black
- Owners: Rob Barletta; Chrissy Barletta
- Head coach: Nic Cota (EHL)

Franchise history
- 2005–2022: Walpole Express
- 2022–present: Express Hockey Club

Championships
- Playoff championships: AJHL: 2010, 2011, 2012

The Express Hockey Club is a junior, youth, and girls hockey organization based in Walpole, Massachusetts. They have had more than 150 commitments since the 2013-14 season, including multiple to the Division One level. The teams play their home games at the Cadillac Ice Arena, located just 2 miles from Gillette Stadium. As of 2022 they have changed their name to Express Hockey Club

== Junior teams ==
Most notably, the Express field teams in the Tier III junior Eastern Hockey League (EHL) (formerly the Atlantic Junior Hockey League) and the EHL's Premier Division.

The EHL team is currently coached by Nic Cota. The EHL teams were previously coached by former professional player and Huntsville Havoc captain Jon Lounsbury, Olympian and NHL alumni Mark Kumpel, former professional player and current Air Force Academy assistant coach Josh Holmstrom, and Cody Campbell who moved on to coach the North American Hockey League's Minot Minotauros.

The Express AJHL team captured three consecutive President's Cup Championships (2010, 2011, and 2012), the AJHL Regular Season Championship two of those years (2011 and 2012), and the 2010 AJHL North Division Championship. The now EHL-19U Elite team (formerly in the Metropolitan Junior Hockey League until 2015) has also won the 2009 MJHL Regular Season Championship and 2011 MJHL Francis Division Championship under general manager and coach Tony Dalessio.

In 2022 the Walpole Express announced that they would be rebranding to the Express Hockey Club to better represent the wide reaching area they serve.

== Season-by-season records ==
Season	GP	W	L	T	OTL	Pts	GF	GA	Regular season finish	Playoffs
Atlantic Junior Hockey League
2005–06	42	10	31	0	1	21	133	227	10th of 11, AJHL	Did not qualify
2006–07	44	22	21	0	1	45	185	165	3rd of 6, North; 7th of 12, AJHL	
2007–08	45	26	18	0	1	53	163	129	4th of 6, North; 6th of 11, AJHL	
2008–09	42	25	12	0	5	55	136	91	3rd of 6, North; 5th of 12, AJHL	
2009–10	42	34	4	0	4	72	180	73	1st of 6, North; 2nd of 12, AJHL	League champions
2010–11	44	38	3	0	3	79	187	67	1st of 6, North; 1st of 12, AJHL	League champions
2011–12	44	38	5	1	0	77	162	65	1st of 12, AJHL	League champions
2012–13	44	29	11	4	0	62	163	94	2nd of 12, AJHL	Lost Quarterfinals, 0–2 vs. New Jersey Rockets
Eastern Hockey League
2013–14	44	13	22	7	2	35	110	150	6th of 6, Central Div. 15th of 17, EHL	Lost Round 1, 0–2 vs. Philadelphia Little Flyers
2014–15	44	29	9	—	6	64	154	121	1st of 5, Boston Div. 5th of 19, EHL	Won Round 1, 2–0 vs. Vermont Lumberjacks; Lost Quarterfinals, 0–2 vs. Connecticut Oilers
2015–16	41	20	13	—	8	48	116	107	4th of 9, North Conf. 9th of 18, EHL-Premier	Won First Round, 2–0 vs. Boston Junior Rangers; Won Second Round, 2–0 vs. Boston Bandits; Lost Semifinals, 0–2 vs. Philadelphia Little Flyers
2016–17	48	24	20	—	4	52	144	147	3rd of 5, Boston Div. 5th of 9, North Conf. 9th of 17, EHL-Premier	Lost First Round, 0–2 vs. Northern Cyclones
2017–18	50	36	11	—	3	75	207	123	2nd of 4, Boston Div. 3rd of 8, North Conf. 5th of 16, EHL	Won First Round, 2–0 vs. New England Wolves; Lost Second Round, 0–2 vs. Boston Junior Rangers
2018–19	45	18	20	—	7	43	143	160	4th of 5, South Div. 7th of 10, New England Conf. 12th of 18, EHL	Did not qualify
2019–20	46	28	13	—	5	61	147	110	5th of 11, New England Conf. 7th of 19, EHL	Lost Play-in Game, 3–5 vs. Seacoast Spartans
2020–21	38	26	10	—	2	54	131	98	2nd of 7, Central Div. 4th of 17, EHL	Won First Round, 2–0 vs.Valley Jr. Warriors; Won Div. Semifinals, 2–0 vs. Western Mass Chiefs; Lost Div. Finals, 0–2 vs. Boston Jr. Rangers
2021–22	46	27	17	—	2	56	130	115	2nd of 5, Central Div. 6th of 17, EHL	Won Div. Semifinal, 2–1 vs.East Coast Wizards; Won Div. Finals, 2–0 vs. Boston Jr. Rangers; Frozen Four - 1-1 Pool A Round Robin (Won 2-0 Avalanche) & (Lost 0-2 New England Wolves); Won Semifinal Gm 3-1 Worcester Jr Railers; Lost Championship Gm 0-2 New Jersey 87's
Express Hockey Club
2022–23	46	30	15	—	1	61	126	97	1st of 5, East Div. 3rd of 19, EHL	Won Div. Semifinal, 2–0 East Coast Wizards; Lost Div. Finals, 1-2 Boston Jr. Rangers
2023–24	46	34	10	1	1	70	155	95	1st of 6, East Div. 3rd of 23, EHL	Won Div. Semifinal, 2=1 Seahawks Hockey Club; Lost Div Finals, 1-2 Boston Jr. Rangers
2024–25	46	36	3	4	3	79	156	73	1st of 6, East Div. 2nd of 21, EHL	Won Div. Semifinal, 2-0 Boston Junior Eagles; Won Div Finals, 2-0 Seahawks Hockey Club; Lost NE Regional 1-2 New Hampshire Avalanche
2025–26	50	34	12	3	1	72	197	141	2nd of 6, East Div. 5th of 20, EHL	Won Div. Semifinal 2-0 Bridgewater Bandits; Lost Div Finals 1-2 Seahawks Hockey Club

== Youth teams ==
The Express field numerous half and full-season youth teams ranging from U14 through U18. The program is led by Ottawa Senators Scout, Todd Stirling.

== Alumni ==
The Walpole Express have produced a number of alumni playing in higher levels of, NCAA Division I, Division III college and professional programs.

Player	Team	Level
Max MacKay	Wheeling Nailers, Bridgeport Sound Tigers	ECHL, American Hockey League (AHL)
Matt Harrington	Mississippi Riverkings, Cape Cod Bluefins	SPHL, Federal Hockey League
Ben Oskroba	Peoria Rivermen, Northeastern University	SPHL, D-I
Georgiy Gurianov	HC CSKA Moscow	KHL
Jake Brightbill	Sacred Heart University	D-I
Zach Andrews	UMass Boston	D-III
Chris Comprosky	UMass Boston	D-I
Derek Kump	Holy Cross	D-I
Erick Vos	Holy Cross	D-I
Charles LaChance	AIC	D-I
Steve Charest	Utica College	D-III
Lou Malvasi	Utica College	D-III
Cody Armstrong	Tufts	D-III
Matt Venoit	Penn State	D-I
Brian Greene	Castleton State	D-III
Cal Mell	Union College	D-I
Matt Ryan	Stonehill College	D-II
Brad Arvanitis	Umass Amherst	D-I
Mike Wise	Assumption College	D-II
Charlie Page	Stonehill College	D-II
Max Burum	St Anselm College	D-II
Sam Johnson	Saint Michaels College	D-II
