= New Jersey 87's =

- City: Wall Township, New Jersey
- League: Eastern Hockey League
- Founded: 2018
- Home arena: Jersey Shore Arena
- Colors: blue, white, gold

Franchise history
- 2018–present: New Jersey 87's

The New Jersey 87's are a Tier II Junior "A" ice hockey team from Wall Township, New Jersey. They were an expansion member of the Eastern Hockey League, entering teams in the EHL and EPHL.

== History ==
The New Jersey 87's joined the Eastern Hockey League in 2017 as a member of the Premier Division. The following year, the club added a second franchise and began playing in the league's top division as well. Adam Houli served as the team's Head Coach and General Manager from the club's foundation until taking a similar role with the Johnstown Tomahawks in 2025.

== Season-by-season records ==
Season	GP	W	L	OTL	Pts	GF	GA	Regular season finish	Playoffs
2018–19	45	33	11	1	67	212	118	1st of 3, Central Div; 2nd of 8 South Conf; 3rd of 18, EHL	Lost Conf Semifinals, 1-2 vs. Wilkes-Barre/Scranton Knights
2019–20	46	36	8	2	74	234	104	1st of 8, Mid-Atlantic Conf; 2nd 19, EHL	Playoffs cancelled - Covid
2020–21	38	32	3	3	67	286	82	1st of 6, South Div; 1st of 18, EHL	Won Div Semifinals, 2-0 vs. (Team Maryland); Won Div Finals 2-0 (Philadelphia Little Flyers); Advance to Frozen Four Finals; Round Robin 1-2 eliminated (L, 4-5 New Hampshire Avalanche)(L, 3-5 Boston Junior Rangers) (W, 6-5 Lumberjacks Hockey Club)
2021–22	46	30	12	4	67	160	113	2nd of 4, South Div; 4th of 17, EHL	Won Div Semifinals, 2-0 (Protec Jr. Ducks); Lost Div Finals 0-2 (Philadelphia Little Flyers); OT Win Wild Card Gm, 3-2 (Connecticut Chiefs); Advance to Frozen Four Finals; Round Robin 1-1 Pool B (W, 6-2 Philadelphia Little Flyers)(L, 2-4 Worcester Jr. Railers); Won League Semi-Finals Gm 3-1 (New England Wolves); Won League Final Gm 2-0 (Worcester Jr. Railers); EHL Champions (1st)
2022–23	46	26	14	6	58	113	90	2nd of 5, South Div; 7th of 19, EHL	Lost Div Semifinals, 1-2 (Philadelphia Little Flyers)
2023–24	46	25	16	5	55	110	111	2nd of 6, South Div; 8th of 23, EHL	Won Div Semifinals, 2-0 (Team Maryland); Lost Div Finals 0-2 (Philadelphia Little Flyers)
2024–25	46	33	12	1	67	207	110	2nd of 5, South Div; 6th of 20, EHL	Won Div Semifinals, 2-0 (Pennsylvania Huntsmen); Won Div Finals 2-0 (Philadelphia Hockey Club); Won Regional Finals, 2-1 (Providence Capitals); Won League Final, 2-1 (New Hampshire Avalanche); EHL Champions (2nd)
2025–26	50	35	13	2	72	189	98	2nd of 5, South Div; 4th of 20, EHL	Lost Div Semifinals, 0-2 (New Jersey Bears)
