= East Coast Wizards =

- City: Bedford, Massachusetts
- League: Eastern Hockey League
- Division: North
- Founded: 2014 (EHL)
- Home arena: Edge Sports Center
- Colors: Black, gold and white
- Owner: Scott Fusco
- Head coach: Kory Falite

The East Coast Wizards are a Tier III junior ice hockey team playing in the Eastern Hockey League (EHL). The Wizards play their home games at the Edge Sports Center in Bedford, Massachusetts.

== History ==
Added as an expansion team for the second EHL season, the East Coast Wizards are the highest level of play supported by the organization that spans more than club 40 teams from age 5 through adult hockey. Playing out of the highest level of the league, the Wizards have seen moderate success but have largely failed in their pursuit of a league championship.

== Season-by-season records ==
Season	GP	W	L	OTL	SOL	Pts	GF	GA	Regular season finish	Playoffs
2014–15	44	21	20	2	1	45	121	142	2nd of 5, Boston Div. 10th of 19, EHL	Lost First Round series, 1–2 (New York Bobcats)
2015–16	41	8	32	1	–	17	84	164	9th of 9, Northern Conf. 17th of 18, EHL	Did not qualify
2016–17	48	21	20	7	–	52	144	147	3rd of 5, Boston Div. 7th of 9, North Conf. 11th of 17, EHL	Won Conf. Quarterfinal series, 2–1 (Valley Jr. Warriors); Lost Div. Semifinal series, 1–2 (Philadelphia Jr. Flyers)
2017–18	50	29	18	3	–	61	170	147	3rd of 4, Boston Div. 4th of 8, North Conf. 7th of 16, EHL	Won Conf. Quarterfinal series, 2–0 (Vermont Lumberjacks); Lost Conf. Semifinal series, 0–2 (New Hampshire Avalanche)
2018–19	45	29	12	3	–	61	174	109	1st of 5, South Div. 2nd of 10, New England Conf. 4th of 18, EHL	Won Conf. Semifinal series, 2–1 (Vermont Lumberjacks); Lost Frozen Finals Round Robin, 3–4 (Philadelphia Little Flyers), 7–2 (Wilkes-Barre/Scranton Knights), 1–4 (New Hampshire Avalanche)
2019–20	46	23	17	6	–	52	164	132	7th of 11, New England Conf. 10th of 19, EHL	Won Preliminary game, 2–1 (New England Wolves); Won Conf. Quarterfinal series, 2–1 (Seahawks Hockey Club); Postseason cancelled prior to conference semifinals
2020–21	38	17	19	2	–	36	116	144	t–4th of 7, Central Div. t–10th of 17, EHL	Lost Div. Quarterfinal series, 1–2 (Worcester Jr. Railers)
2021–22	46	20	23	3	–	43	115	145	t–3rd of 5, East Div. t–11th of 17, EHL	Lost Div. Semifinal series, 1–2 (Walpole Express)
2022–23	46	18	20	3	5	44	128	148	4th of 5, East Div. t–12th of 19, EHL	Won Div. Qualifier, 8–4 (Valley Jr. Warriors); Lost Div. Semifinal series, 0–2 (Express Hockey Club)
2023–24	46	29	11	3	3	64	177	146	3rd of 6, East Div. 6th of 23, EHL	Lost Div. Semifinal series, 0–2 (Boston Jr. Rangers)
2024–25	46	31	12	1	2	65	192	129	2nd of 6, East Div. 7th of 20, EHL	Lost Div. Semifinal series, 1–2 (Seahawks Hockey Club)
2025–26	50	24	21	3	2	54	144	160	2nd of 4, North Div. 8th of 20, EHL	Won Div. Semifinal series, 2-1 (Valley Jr. Warriors); Lost Div. Final 1-2 (New Hampshire Avalanche)
