= New Hampshire Avalanche =

- City: Hooksett, New Hampshire
- League: Eastern Hockey League
- Division: North
- Founded: 2017 (EHL); 2019 (EHLP)
- Home arena: Ice Den Arena
- Colors: Navy, gold and white
- Head coach: Chris Cerrella (EHL); Josh Bourdon (EHLP)

Championships
- Regular season titles: 2 (EHL): 2023, 2025; 1 (EHLP): 2022
- League champions: 2 (EHL): 2018, 2019
- Division titles: 7 (EHL): 2018, 2019, 2021, 2022, 2023, 2024, 2025; 2 (EHLP): 2021, 2022
- Conference titles: 2 (EHL): 2018, 2019

The New Hampshire Avalanche are a pair of Tier III junior ice hockey teams playing in the Eastern Hockey League (EHL). The Avalanche play their home games at the Ice Den Arena in Hooksett, New Hampshire.

== History ==
After the New Hampshire Jr. Monarchs announced that they were leaving for the USPHL in 2017, the area became a target for the EHL's expansion plans for the following season. In February of that year, the league approved eleven new teams for the following season, which included the New Hampshire Avalanche. The Avalanche hit the ground running, finishing their inaugural season with the second best record in the league and went on to capture the championship. After repeating as champions the following year, the Avalanche added a lower-tier team that would play in the under-19 Eastern Hockey League Premier Division (EHLP) that was designed to serve as a feeder league for the top level of play.

For the first year under this new policy, both Avalanche teams played well and finished near the top of the standings. Unfortunately, the COVID-19 pandemic ended both postseasons prematurely. Over the next several years, New Hampshire remained one of the best clubs in either division with the original team reaching the championship game in both 2023 and 2025, losing both.

== Season-by-season records ==
=== EHL ===
Season	GP	W	L	OTL	SOL	Pts	GF	GA	Regular season finish	Playoffs
2017–18	50	39	7	4	–	82	204	99	1st of 4, New England Div. 1st of 8, North Conf. 2nd of 16, EHL	Won Conf. Semifinal series, 2–0 (East Coast Wizards); Won Frozen Finals Round Robin, 3–1 (Philadelphia Revolution), 1–2 (Philadelphia Little Flyers), 7–4 (Boston Jr. Rangers); Won Championship, 3–2 (Philadelphia Revolution)
2018–19	45	39	6	0	–	78	237	93	1st of 5, North Div. 1st of 10, New England Conf. 2nd of 18, EHL	Won Conf. Semifinal series, 2–0 (Boston Jr. Rangers); Won Frozen Finals Round Robin, 4–0 (Wilkes-Barre/Scranton Knights), 3–2 (Philadelphia Little Flyers), 4–1 (East Coast Wizards); Won Championship, 4–3 (Philadelphia Little Flyers)
2019–20	46	33	9	4	–	70	185	87	2nd of 11, New England Conf. 3rd of 19, EHL	Postseason cancelled prior to conference semifinals
2020–21	38	26	8	4	–	56	146	90	1st of 5, North Div. 3rd of 17, EHL	Lost Div. Semifinal series, 0–2 (Seacoast Spartans)
2021–22	46	32	9	5	–	69	179	97	1st of 4, North Div. 2nd of 17, EHL	Won Div. Semifinal series, 2–0 (Seacoast Spartans); Won Div. Final series, 2–0 (New England Wolves); Lost Frozen Finals Round Robin, 0–2 (Walpole Express), 1–2 (OT) (New England Wolves)
2022–23	46	34	9	3	0	71	187	122	1st of 4, North Div. 1st of 19, EHL	Won Div. Semifinal series, 2–0 (Vermont Lumberjacks); Won Div. Final series, 2–1 (Seacoast Spartans); Won Semifinal, 2–0 (Philadelphia Little Flyers); Lost Championship, 2–4 (Boston Jr. Rangers)
2023–24	46	34	9	3	0	71	189	108	1st of 5, North Div. 2nd of 23, EHL	Won Div. Semifinal series, 2–1 (Valley Jr. Warriors); Won Div. Final series, 2–0 (Seacoast Spartans); Lost Semifinal series, 1–2 (Boston Jr. Rangers)
2024–25	46	37	4	0	5	79	216	79	1st of 5, North Div. t–1st of 20, EHL	Won Div. Semifinal series, 2–0 (Valley Jr. Warriors); Won Div. Final series, 2–0 (Vermont Lumberjacks); Won Regional Final series, 2–0 (Express Hockey Club); Lost Championship series, 1–2 (New Jersey 87's)
2025–26	50	41	6	3	0	85	251	99	1st of 4, North Div. 1st of 20, EHLP	Div. Semifinal bye Won Div Final, 2-1 (East Coast Wizards); Lost League Semifinal 1-2 (Seahawks Hockey Club)

=== EHLP ===
Season	GP	W	L	OTL	SOL	Pts	GF	GA	Regular season finish	Playoffs
2019–20	43	32	10	1	–	65	200	121	2nd of 8, New England Conf. 3rd of 13, EHLP	Postseason cancelled prior to conference semifinals
2020–21	34	29	4	1	–	59	158	90	1st of 4, North Div. 2nd of 12, EHLP	Lost Div. Final series, 1–2 (Lumberjacks Hockey Club)
2021–22	42	30	6	6	–	66	154	92	1st of 5, North Div. 1st of 13, EHLP	Won Div. Semifinal series, 2–0 (New England Wolves); Lost Div. Final series, 0–2 (Vermont Lumberjacks); Won Frozen Finals Round Robin, 3–5 (Boston Jr. Rangers), 3–2 (Philadelphia Little Flyers), 4–3 (Vermont Lumberjacks); Lost Championship, 3–4 (OT) (Boston Jr. Rangers)
2022–23	42	24	14	3	1	52	182	133	4th of 5, New England Div. 8th of 15, EHLP	Won Div. Semifinal series, 2–0 (Adirondack Jr. Thunder); Won Div. Final series, 2–1 (New England Wolves); Lost Frozen Finals Round Robin, 2–3 (Railers Jr. Hockey Club), 2–0 (Boston Jr. Rangers), 2–3 (New Jersey 87's)
2023–24	42	17	20	3	2	38	149	162	3rd of 4, New England Div. 10th of 16, EHLP	Lost Div. Semifinal series, 0–2 (New England Wolves)
2024–25	42	26	12	3	1	56	153	117	2nd of 5, North Div. 3rd of 16, EHLP	Lost Div. Semifinal series, 2–0 (Adirondack Jr. Thunder)
2025–26	42	36	4	0	2	74	209	93	1st of 6, Northeast. 1st of 12, EHLP	Won Div. Semifinal series, ?-? (Providence Capitals); Won Division Finals ?_? (Seahawks Hockey Club); Won League Finals ?-? (New Jersey 87's)
