= Lewiston MAINEiacs (USPHL) =

- City: Lewiston, Maine
- League: United States Premier Hockey League (USPHL); National Collegiate Development Conference (NCDC)
- Conference: New England
- Division: North
- Founded: 2018
- Home arena: The Colisée
- Colors: Blue,Light Blue,Orange
- Owner: Nate Bostic
- Head coach: Caleb Labrie

Franchise history
- 2018–2024: Team Maryland
- 2024–2025: Boston Dukes
- 2025–present: Lewiston MAINEiacs

The Lewiston MAINEiacs are a Tier II junior ice hockey team playing in the United States Premier Hockey League's National Collegiate Development Conference. The team plays their home games at The Colisée in Lewiston, Maine.

== History ==
The franchise was founded in 2018 as Team Maryland, and located in Odenton. After a poor record in its first season, the club posted winning marks in each of its next five seasons. Team Maryland made several postseason appearances after the COVID-19 pandemic, however, the franchise was on unsteady ground despite their on-ice success. Shortly after the end of the 2023–24 season, the club was purchased by Boston Hockey Academy and Nate Bostic, who moved the team to Tewksbury, Massachusetts, and renamed the team to the Boston Dukes. The first year under new management in Massachusetts didn't go as planned, as the team finished with the second-worst record in the league and missed the postseason.

After one season in Massachusetts, the team again moved north, this time to Lewiston, Maine. Team owner Nate Bostic had purchased The Colisée in Lewiston earlier that summer. The Dukes were re-branded to the Lewiston MAINEiacs, after the Quebec Maritimes Junior Hockey League team that played in The Colisée from 2003 to 2011. With the relocation, the team also moved from the Tier III Eastern Hockey League to the United States Premier Hockey League's Tier II league, the National Collegiate Development Conference (NCDC), and assigned to the North Division of the New England Conference of the NCDC.

== Season-by-season records ==
Season	GP	W	L	OTL	SOL	Pts	GF	GA	Regular season finish	Playoffs
Team Maryland
2018–19	46	10	35	1	–	21	99	250	4th of 5, North Div. 17th of 18, EHL	Did not qualify
2019–20	46	23	19	4	–	50	182	161	4th of 8, Mid-Atlantic Conf. 11th of 19, EHL	Lost Div. Quarterfinal series, 1–2 (Philadelphia Little Flyers)
2020–21	38	16	15	7	–	39	128	146	4th of 6, South Div. 8th of 17, EHL	Won Div. Quarterfinal series, 2–0 (Connecticut RoughRiders); Lost Div. Semifinal series, 0–2 (New Jersey 87's)
2021–22	46	25	19	2	–	52	157	139	4th of 4, South Div. 8th of 17, EHL	Lost Div. Semifinal series, 0–2 (Philadelphia Little Flyers)
2022–23	46	22	17	4	3	51	131	120	4th of 5, South Div. t–11th of 19, EHL	Won Playoff Qualifier, 7–1 (Philadelphia Hockey Club); Won Div. Semifinal series, 2–1 (Protec Jr. Ducks); Lost Div. Final series, 1–2 (Philadelphia Little Flyers)
2023–24	46	24	18	2	2	52	135	125	3rd of 6, South Div. 10th of 23, EHL	Lost Div. Semifinals, 0–2 (New Jersey 87's)
Boston Dukes
2024–25	46	9	35	1	1	20	83	211	5th of 5, North Div. 19th of 20, EHL	Did not qualify
Lewiston MAINEiacs
2025–26	58	41	10	31	4	89	212	138	1st of 7, New England North; 2nd of 33, NCDC	Won Div Semifinal 3-0 (CT Chiefs North); Won Div Final 3-1 (Woodstock Slammers); Conference RR 0-2 eliminated
