= New England Wolves =

- City: Laconia, New Hampshire
- League: United States Premier Hockey League; National Collegiate Development Conference (NCDC)
- Division: Metropolitan
- Home arena: Merrill Fay Arena
- Colors: Red, gray, black, and white
- General manager: Andrew Trimble
- Head coach: Tim Kunes (EHL); Connor Bates (EHL-Premier)

Franchise history
- 1998–2013: Laconia Leafs
- 2013–2014: New Hampshire Lakers
- 2014–present: New England Wolves

The New England Wolves are a Tier II junior ice hockey team playing in the United States Premier Hockey League (USPHL) National Collegiate Development Conference (NCDC). The team plays their home games at the Merrill Fay Arena, located in Laconia, New Hampshire.

The organization also fields a developmental Tier III team (former Tier III Junior B) in the EHL Premier Division and many youth programs.

== History ==
The Laconia Leafs played in Laconia, New Hampshire in the Tier III Junior A Atlantic Junior Hockey League (AJHL) from 2005 to 2013 when Tier III junior hockey leagues underwent a reorganization. In August 2013, they announced their re-branding to New Hampshire Lakers as part of the also re-branded AJHL in the Eastern Hockey League (EHL). However, they did not field a team for 2013–14 season. The franchise was re-located to Waterville Valley, New Hampshire and became the New England Wolves in the 2014–15 season of the EHL. In 2015, the EHL added a lower division and the current teams were all placed in the EHL-Premier Division. In 2016, the EHL-Premier Wolves returned to Laconia, joining their EHL-19U Elite Division team at Merrill Fay Arena. In 2017, the league re-branded, dropping the Premier name from their top division and renamed the Elite Division to Premier.

Prior to and during their membership in the AJHL, the Leafs had fielded a Tier III Junior B team in the Metropolitan Junior Hockey League. In 2015, EHL created an Elite Division and many of the EHL organizations moved their developmental Tier III teams from the MetJHL to the new EHL-Elite including the Wolves.

During the 2025-26 season the Wolves announced their intention to move to the USPHL NCDC for the 2026-27 season. The EHL suspended the Wolves in December for the balance of their schedule. The USPHL started them for the remaining portion of the year.

== Season-by-season records ==
Season	GP	W	L	T	OTL	Pts	GF	GA	Regular season finish	Playoffs
Atlantic Junior Hockey League
2005–06	42	3	36	0	3	9	85	221	11th of 11, AJHL	Did not qualify
2006–07	44	5	37	0	2	12	117	313	6th of 6, North; 12th of 12, AJHL	Did not qualify
2007–08	45	5	36	0	4	14	148	319	6th of 6, North; 11th of 11, AJHL	Did not qualify
2008–09	42	5	36	0	1	11	66	204	6th of 6, North; 12th of 12, AJHL	Did not qualify
2009–10	42	3	39	0	0	6	90	270	6th of 6, North; 12th of 12, AJHL	Did not qualify
2010–11	44	10	34	0	0	20	110	238	6th of 6, North; 10th of 12, AJHL	Did not qualify
2011–12	44	3	35	5	1	12	68	199	11th of 12, AJHL	Did not qualify
2012–13	44	10	26	8	0	28	102	182	11th of 12, AJHL	Did not qualify
Eastern Hockey League
2013–14	Dormant									
2014–15	44	13	29	—	2	28	92	169	4th of 4, North; 17th of 19, EHL	Did not qualify
2015–16	41	11	29	—	1	23	95	216	8th of 9, North Conf. 16th of 18, EHL-Premier	Lost First Round, 0–2 vs. Boston Bandits
2016–17	48	8	36	—	4	20	98	196	4th of 4, New England Div. 9th of 9, North Conf. 17th of 17, EHL-Premier	Did not qualify
2017–18	50	17	31	—	2	36	146	234	3rd of 4, New England Div. 6th of 8, North Conf. 11th of 16, EHL	Lost First Round, 0–2 vs. Walpole Express
2018–19	44	17	26	—	1	35	162	202	5th of 5, North Div. 9th of 10, New England Conf. 15th of 18, EHL	Did not qualify
2019–20	46	25	16	—	5	55	170	161	6th of 11, New England Conf. 9th of 19, EHL	Lost Play-in Game, 1–2 vs. East Coast Wizards
2020–21	36	20	13	—	3	43	139	140	2nd of 4, North Div. 5th of 17, EHL	Lost Div. Semifinals, 0–2 vs. Vermont Lumberjacks
2021–22	46	23	19	—	50	43	138	168	2nd of 4, North Div. 9th of 17, EHL	Won Div. Semifinals, 2-1 Vermont Lumberjacks; Lost Div. Finals 0-2 New Hampshire Avalanche; Won Wild Card Gm 2-1ot Boston Jr. Rangers; Frozen Four 2-0 Pool A Round Robin (2-1 to New Hampshire Avalanche) & (2-0 Walpole Express); Lost Semifinal Gm 1-3 New Jersey 87's
2022–23	46	26	17	-	3	55	163	157	3rd of 4, North Div. 8th of 19, EHL	Lost Div. Semifinals, 0-2 Seacoast Spartans
2023–24	46	21	19	4	2	48	145	151	3rd of 5, North Div. 13th of 23, EHL	Lost Div. Semifinals, 0-2 Seacoast Spartans
2024–25	46	34	11	1	0	69	183	122	2nd of 5, North Div. 3rd of 21, EHL	Lost Div. Semifinals, 1-2 Vermont Lumberjacks
2025–26	22	15	6	1	0	31	97	55	3rd of 4, North Div. 13th of 17, EHL	No playoffs suspended by EHL
USPHL - NCDC
2025–26	25	16	9	0	0	32	96	75	7th of 7, New England North; 32nd of 33, NCDC	No playoffs

== Alumni ==
The Leafs/Wolves have produced several players that have moved on to higher levels of junior hockey, NCAA Division I, Division III college and professional programs.
