= Philadelphia Little Flyers =

- City: Aston, Pennsylvania
- League: Eastern Hockey League
- Division: South
- Home arena: IceWorks Skating Complex
- Colors: Black, Orange, and White
- Owner: Jim Watson
- Head coach: Mark Catron

Franchise history
- 2003–present: Philadelphia Little Flyers

The Philadelphia Little Flyers are a USA Hockey-sanctioned Tier III junior ice hockey team from Aston, Pennsylvania. They play in the South Conference of the Eastern Hockey League (EHL) at the IceWorks Skating Complex

The players, ages 16–20, carry amateur status under junior A guidelines and hope to earn a spot on higher levels of junior hockey in the United States and Canada, Canadian major junior, collegiate, and eventually professional teams.

== History ==
The Little Flyers were one of the six charter members for the Atlantic Junior Hockey League (AJHL) in 2003 after previously having Tier III Junior B teams in the Metropolitan Junior Hockey League. They played in every season of the AJHL until 2013 when Tier III junior hockey leagues were reorganized and the AJHL was re-branded as the Eastern Hockey League (EHL). In 2015, the EHL added a lower level of Tier III junior hockey for player development called the EHL-Elite Division and all the current EHL members, including the Little Flyers, were added to the EHL-Premier Division. In 2017, the league re-branded again, dropping the Premier name from their top division and renamed the Elite Division to Premier.

The organization also continues to field youth hockey select teams at the Midget 18U, Midget 16U, Bantam, Peewee, and Squirt levels. From 2003 to 2015, the Little Flyers fielded a team at the former Tier III Junior B level in the Metropolitan Junior Hockey League.

== Season-by-season records ==
Season	GP	W	L	T	OTL	Pts	GF	GA	Regular season finish	Playoffs
Atlantic Junior Hockey League
2003–04	No information								5th of 6, AJHL	Won Quarterfinal game, 5–3 vs. New Jersey Titans; Won Semifinal game, 3–2 vs. Hartford Jr. Wolfpack; Lost Championship game, 2–7 vs. Washington Jr. Nationals
2004–05	41	13	25	0	3	29	124	212	4th of 4, South; 7th of 8, AJHL	did not qualify
2005–06	42	21	17	0	4	46	171	184	5th of 11, AJHL	Lost Quarterfinals, 1–2 vs. Hudson Valley Eagles
2006–07	44	19	23	0	2	40	186	212	5th of 6, South; 9th of 12, AJHL	
2007–08	44	23	19	0	2	48	177	183	3rd of 5, South; 7th of 11, AJHL	
2008–09	42	20	20	0	2	42	137	154	3rd of 6, South; 7th of 12, AJHL	
2009–10	42	13	26	0	3	29	134	211	5th of 6, South; 10th of 12, AJHL	
2010–11	44	19	19	0	6	44	156	176	2nd of 6, South; 7th of 12, AJHL	
2011–12	44	12	28	3	1	28	114	192	10th of 12, AJHL	
2012–13	44	11	23	6	4	32	127	155	9th of 12, AJHL	did not qualify
Eastern Hockey League
2013–14	44	28	11	2	3	61	169	93	1st of 6, South Div. 2nd of 17, EHL	Won Round 1, 2–0 vs. Walpole Express; Won Quarterfinals, 2–1 vs. Hartford Jr. Wolfpack; Lost Semifinals, 0–2 vs. Northern Cyclones
2014–15	44	37	3	—	4	78	206	75	1st of 5, South Div. 1st of 19, EHL	Won Round 1, 2–0 vs. Valley Jr. Warriors; Won Quarterfinals, 2–0 vs. Hartford Jr. Wolfpack; Lost Semifinals, 0–2 vs. Connecticut Oilers
2015–16	41	33	8	—	0	66	197	83	1st of 9, South Conf. 1st of 18, EHL-Premier	Won First Round, 2–0 vs. Connecticut Nighthawks; Won Second Round, 2–0 vs. Philadelphia Revolution; Won Semifinals, 2–0 vs. Walpole Express; Lost Finals, 0–3 vs. New Hampshire Jr. Monarchs
2016–17	48	39	5	—	5	83	194	74	1st of 4, Mid-Atlantic Div. 1st of 8, South Conf. 1st of 17, EHL-Premier	Won First Round, 2–1 vs. Connecticut Nighthawks; Won Quarterfinals, 2–0 vs. New York Apple Core; Won Semifinals, 2–0 vs. New Jersey Rockets; Lost Finals, 2–3 vs. Philadelphia Junior Flyers
2017–18	50	39	9	—	2	80	213	104	2nd of 4, Mid-Atlantic Div. 2nd of 8, South Conf. 3rd of 16, EHL	Won First Round, 2–0 vs. Connecticut Oilers; Won Second Round, 2–0 vs. Connecticut RoughRiders; 2–1–0 in Frozen Finals round-robin (OTW, 4–3 vs. Jr. Rangers; W, 2–1 vs. Avalanche; L, 0–3 vs. Revolution)
2018–19	44	40	3	—	1	81	246	73	1st of 5, South Div. 1st of 8, Mid-Atlantic Conf. 1st of 18, EHL	First Round bye Won Second Round, 2–0 vs. Philadelphia Revolution; 2–1–0 in Frozen Finals round-robin (W, 4–3 vs. Wizards; L, 2–3 vs. Avalanche; W, 6–1 vs. Knights); Lost Championship game, 3–4 vs. New Hampshire Avalanche
2019–20	46	23	20	—	3	49	161	159	5th of 8, Mid-Atlantic Conf. 12th of 19, EHL	Won First Round, 2–1 vs. Team Maryland; Playoffs cancelled
2020–21	38	20	15	—	3	43	142	123	2nd of 6, South Div. 6th of 17, EHL	Won Div. Semifinals, 2–0 vs. Protec Jr. Ducks; Lost Div. Finals, 0–2 vs. New Jersey 87's
2021–22	46	30	12	—	4	64	210	137	1st of 4, South Div. 3rd of 17, EHL	Won Div. Semifinals, 2–0 vs. Team Maryland; Won Div. Finals, 2-0 vs. New Jersey 87's South Div. Champions; Frozen Four - 0-2-0 Pool B (L 0-4, Jr. Railers) & (L 2-6, 87's)
2022–23	46	23	16	3	2	53	151	146	3rd of 5, South Div. 9th of 19, EHL	Won Div. Semifinals, 2–1 New Jersey 87's Won Div. Finals, 2-1 Team Maryland; South Div. Champions; Frozen Four Playoffs; Lost Semifinals 0-2 New Hampshire Avalanche
2023–24	46	23	20	1	2	49	132	135	4th of 6, South Div. 11th of 23, EHL	Won Div. Play In Game, 1-0 Philadelphia Hockey Club; Won Div Semifinals, 2-0 New Jersey Bears; Won Div Finals, 2-0 New Jersey 87's South Div. Champions; Frozen Four Lost Semi Finals, 1-2 Worcester Jr. Railers
2024–25	46	19	23	2	2	42	143	174	5th of 5, South Div. 14th of 21, EHL	Did Not Qualify
2025–26	50	19	29	2	0	40	122	158	4th of 5, South Div. 11th of 20, EHL	lost Div. Semifinals, 2–0 vs. Philadelphia Hockey Club

== Alumni ==
The Little Flyers have produced a number of alumni playing in higher levels of junior hockey, NCAA Division I and III, ACHA college, and professional programs, including:

- Harry Dumas (Official) - AHL and NHL
- Ian Walsh (Official) - NHL
- Mark Eaton - Pittsburgh Penguins (NHL)
- Chris Ferraro New York Rangers 1992 NHL Entry Draft - Las Vegas Wranglers (ECHL)
- Peter Ferraro New York Rangers 1992 NHL Entry Draft - Las Vegas Wranglers (ECHL)
- Arpad Mihaly - HC Bolzano (Serie A)
- Mike Richter New York Rangers 1985 NHL Entry Draft - New York Rangers (NHL)
- Johnny Gaudreau Calgary Flames 2011 NHL Entry Draft - Calgary Flames (NHL)
