= Vermont Lumberjacks =

- City: Burlington, Vermont
- League: Eastern Hockey League
- Division: North
- Founded: 2003
- Folded: 2025
- Home arena: Leddy Arena
- Colors: green, yellow and red
- Owner: Maurice Rosales
- General manager: Maurice Rosales
- Head coach: Seth Gustin (EHL); Jack Lowry (Premier)

Franchise history
- 2003–2014: Washington Junior Nationals
- 2014–2025: Vermont Lumberjacks

The Vermont Lumberjacks was a USA Hockey-sanctioned Tier III Junior A ice hockey organization from Burlington, Vermont.

== History ==
In 2003, the Washington Jr. Nationals from Arlington, Virginia, became a charter member of the new Tier III Junior A Atlantic Junior Hockey League (AJHL). They originally played at the Bowie Ice Arena in Bowie, Maryland, from 2003 to 2005 before moving splitting time with The Gardens Ice House in Laurel, Maryland, in 2006. With the opening of the new Washington Capitals practice facility at the 1,200-seat Kettler Capitals Iceplex, the Jr. Nationals moved across the Potomac River, splitting time between The Gardens Ice House and their new venue in 2006–07 until becoming full-time tenants in Arlington for the 2007–08 season. The team moved back to The Gardens Ice House in 2010. The team also played single games at the Ashburn Ice House in the 2008–09 and 2009–10 season as a way to reach out to area youth hockey organizations.

In 2013, Tier III junior hockey went through a large reorganization that led to the dissolution of the Eastern Junior Hockey League (EJHL) and six former EJHL teams joining the AJHL. The AJHL was then re-branded as the Eastern Hockey League (EHL).

Following the 2013–14 season, the Jr. Nationals were relocated to Burlington, Vermont, and renamed the Vermont Lumberjacks, bringing junior hockey back to the state of Vermont two years after the Green Mountain Glades departed following the 2011–12 season.

In 2015, the EHL added a lower level Tier III division (formerly called Tier III Junior B by USA Hockey) called the EHL-Elite Division. This led to the current EHL teams to be placed in the EHL-Premier Division and the Lumberjacks moving their Junior B team from the Metropolitan Junior Hockey League to the Elite Division. In 2017, the EHL re-branded its divisions, dropping the Premier name from their top division and renamed the Elite Division to Premier.

Due to the COVID-19 pandemic, the Lumberjacks relocated halfway through the 2020–21 season to have home games at Waterville Valley Ice Arena in Waterville Valley, New Hampshire, as the Lumberjacks Hockey Club.

The Vermont Lumberjacks in the 2025-2026 season ceased operations and have not returned to play in the EHL.

== Season-by-season records ==
Season	GP	W	L	T	OTL	Pts	GF	GA	Regular season finish	Playoffs
Washington Jr. Nationals
Atlantic Junior Hockey League
2003–04	No information								3rd of 6, AJHL	Won Semifinal game, 3–1 vs. New York Bobcats; Won Championship game, 7–2 vs. Philadelphia Little Flyers; League champions
2004–05	41	14	25	0	2	30	116	163	3rd of 4, South; 6th of 8, AJHL	
2005–06	42	17	23	0	2	36	146	200	9th of 11, AJHL	
2006–07	44	23	18	0	3	49	175	168	3rd of 6, South; 5th of 12, AJHL	
2007–08	44	22	19	0	3	47	166	178	4th of 5, South; 8th of 11, AJHL	
2008–09	42	17	19	0	6	40	135	145	5th of 6, South; 9th of 12, AJHL	
2009–10	42	17	22	0	3	37	148	176	4th of 6, South; 8th of 12, AJHL	
2010–11	44	6	38	0	0	12	98	286	6th of 6, South; 12th of 12, AJHL	
2011–12	44	3	38	2	1	9	74	227	12th of 12, AJHL	
2012–13	44	7	33	2	2	18	88	183	12th of 12, AJHL	Did not qualify
Eastern Hockey League
2013–14	44	5	37	1	1	12	121	146	6th of 6, South Div. 17th of 17, EHL	Lost Play-in game, 2–8 vs. New Jersey Titans
Vermont Lumberjacks
2014–15	44	16	24	—	4	36	107	154	3rd of 4, North Div. 15th of 19, EHL	Lost Round 1, 0–2 vs. Walpole Express
2015–16	41	17	22	—	2	36	113	130	7th of 9, North Conf. 14th of 18, EHL-Premier	Lost First Round, 0–2 vs. New Hampshire Junior Monarchs
2016–17	48	22	18	—	8	52	158	140	3rd of 4, New England; 6th of 9, North Conf. 10th of 17, EHL-Premier	Lost First Round, 1–2 vs. Boston Junior Rangers
2017–18	50	24	24	—	2	50	163	162	2nd of 4, New England; 5th of 8, North Conf. 9th of 16, EHL	Lost First Round, 0–2 vs. East Coast Wizards
2018–19	45	28	14	—	3	59	211	141	2nd of 5, North Div. 3rd of 10, New England Conf. 5th of 18, EHL	Won First Round, 2–0 vs. Connecticut RoughRiders; Lost Second Round, 1–2 vs. East Coast Wizards
2019–20	46	34	11	—	1	69	209	131	3rd of 11, New England Conf. 4th of 19, EHL	Won First Round, 2–0 vs. Seacoast Spartans; Playoffs cancelled
2020–21	35	17	17	—	1	35	133	142	3rd of 4, North Div. 12th of 17, EHL	Won Div. Semifinals, 2–0 vs. New England Wolves; Won Div. Finals, 2–0 vs. Seacoast Spartans; 1–2–0 EHL Frozen Finals round-robin (W, 5–3 vs. Jr. Rangers; L, 3–9 vs. Avalanche; L, 5–6 vs. 87's)
2021–22	46	21	20	—	5	47	168	152	3rd of 4, North Div. 10th of 17, EHL	Lost Div. Semifinals, 0-2 vs. New England Wolves
2022–23	46	25	20	—	1	51	158	136	4th of 4, North Div. 11th of 19, EHL	Lost Div. Semifinals, 0-2 vs. New Hampshire Avalanche
2023–24	46	20	25	—	1	41	126	168	5th of 5, North Div. 16th of 23, EHL	Did Not Qualify
2024–25	45	23	17	2	3	51	126	137	3rd of 5, North Div. 8th of 21, EHL	Won Div. Semifinals, 2–1 New England Wolves; Lost Div. Finals, 0-2 New Hampshire Avalanche

== Alumni ==
The Jr. Nationals/Lumberjacks have produced a number of alumni playing in higher levels of junior hockey, NCAA Division I, Division III, ACHA college and professional programs.

- David Bondra – Played with HK Poprad of the Slovak Extraliga.
- Nikita Kashirsky – Played with the HC Spartak Moscow of the Kontinental Hockey League.
- Jarred Tinordi (Montreal Canadiens, 1st round draft pick) – Has played in the NHL with the Canadiens and Arizona Coyotes. Currently under contract with the Nashville Predators.
