= Julia Zorn =

German ice hockey player

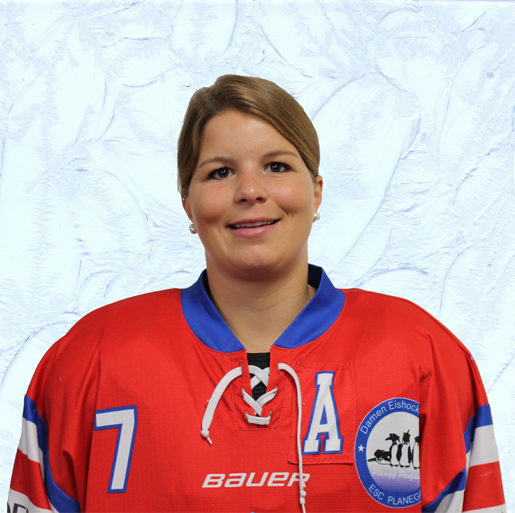
- Born: 6 February 1990 (age 36) Gräfelfing, West Germany
- Height: 1.70 m (5 ft 7 in)
- Weight: 69 kg (152 lb; 10 st 12 lb)
- Position: Forward
- Shoots: Left
- DFEL team: ESC Planegg
- National team: Germany
- Playing career: 2007–present

Julia Zorn (born 6 February 1990) is a German ice hockey forward and former goaltender for ESC Planegg and the German national team.

She participated at the 2015 IIHF Women's World Championship.

Zorn made history in 2012, becoming the first ever player to compete as a goalie and as a skater at IIHF events. She was a goaltender with the Germany women's national under-18 ice hockey team, but then switched to being a forward, which she has been at subsequent international events.

== International career ==
Zorn was selected for the Germany women's national ice hockey team in the 2014 Winter Olympics. She played in all five games, scoring one goal.

Zorn also played for Germany in the qualifying event for the 2014 Winter Olympics. She also appeared in the 2010 qualifying, as the reserve goaltender.

As of 2014, Zorn has also appeared for Germany at four IIHF Women's World Championships. Her first appearance came in 2009.

Zorn made one appearance for the Germany women's national under-18 ice hockey team, at the IIHF World Women's U18 Championships, in 2008.

== Career statistics ==
Through 2013–14 season

Year	Team	Event	GP	G	A	Pts	PIM
2008	Germany U18	U18	5	0	0	0	0
2009	Germany	WW DI	5	0	1	1	0
2011	Germany	WW DI	4	1	1	2	4
2012	Germany	WW	5	4	0	4	2
2014	Germany	OlyQ	3	2	0	2	2
2013	Germany	WW	5	1	1	2	0
2014	Germany	Oly	5	1	0	1	2

Year	Team	Event	GP	W	L	MIN	GA	SO	GAA	SV%
2008	Germany U18	U18	5	3	2	275	12	0	2.61	.893
