= Ice hockey at the 2014 Winter Olympics =

Ice hockey at the XXII Olympic Winter Games
- Venues: Bolshoy Ice Dome; Shayba Arena
- Dates: 8–23 February 2014
- Competitors: 468 from 14 nations

Men's ice hockey at the XXII Olympic Winter Games

Medalists
1st place, gold medalist(s)		Canada
2nd place, silver medalist(s)		Sweden
3rd place, bronze medalist(s)		Finland

Women's ice hockey at the XXII Olympic Winter Games

Medalists
1st place, gold medalist(s)		Canada
2nd place, silver medalist(s)		United States
3rd place, bronze medalist(s)		Switzerland

The ice hockey competitions of the 2014 Winter Olympics were played at two venues, located 300 meters from the other, within the Olympic Park in Sochi, Russia. The Bolshoy Ice Dome, which seats 12,000, resembles a Fabergé egg. The Shayba Arena, seating 7,000, was supposed to be a moveable structure but eventually stayed in Sochi. Both venues are IIHF-sized (60 meters by 30 meters).

The men's tournament had twelve teams competing and the women's tournament had eight teams: tournament play began on 8 February 2014. The women's concluded on 20 February and the men's on 23 February.

Canada men's and Canada women's national teams went through the tournament undefeated, repeating its gold medal achievements at the 2010 Vancouver Winter Olympics.

== Medal summary ==
=== Medal table ===
Rank	Nation	Gold	Silver	Bronze	Total
1	Canada	2	0	0	2
2	Sweden	0	1	0	1
2	United States	0	1	0	1
4	Finland	0	0	1	1
4	Switzerland	0	0	1	1
Totals (5 entries)		2	2	2	6

=== Medalists ===
Event	Gold	Silver	Bronze
Men's	Canada; Jamie Benn; Patrice Bergeron; Jay Bouwmeester; Jeff Carter; Sidney Crosby; Drew Doughty; Matt Duchene; Ryan Getzlaf; Dan Hamhuis; Duncan Keith; Chris Kunitz; Roberto Luongo; Patrick Marleau; Rick Nash; Corey Perry; Alex Pietrangelo; Carey Price; Patrick Sharp; Mike Smith; Martin St. Louis; P. K. Subban; John Tavares; Jonathan Toews; Marc-Édouard Vlasic; Shea Weber	Sweden; Daniel Alfredsson; Nicklas Bäckström; Patrik Berglund; Alexander Edler; Oliver Ekman-Larsson; Jhonas Enroth; Jimmie Ericsson; Jonathan Ericsson; Loui Eriksson; Jonas Gustavsson; Carl Hagelin; Niklas Hjalmarsson; Marcus Johansson; Erik Karlsson; Niklas Kronwall; Marcus Krüger; Gabriel Landeskog; Henrik Lundqvist; Gustav Nyquist; Johnny Oduya; Daniel Sedin; Jakob Silfverberg; Alexander Steen; Henrik Tallinder; Henrik Zetterberg	Finland; Juhamatti Aaltonen; Aleksander Barkov; Mikael Granlund; Juuso Hietanen; Jarkko Immonen; Jussi Jokinen; Olli Jokinen; Leo Komarov; Sami Lepistö; Petri Kontiola; Lauri Korpikoski; Lasse Kukkonen; Jori Lehterä; Kari Lehtonen; Olli Määttä; Antti Niemi; Antti Pihlström; Tuukka Rask; Tuomo Ruutu; Sakari Salminen; Sami Salo; Teemu Selänne; Kimmo Timonen; Ossi Väänänen; Sami Vatanen
Women's	Canada; Meghan Agosta-Marciano; Gillian Apps; Mélodie Daoust; Laura Fortino; Jayna Hefford; Haley Irwin; Brianne Jenner; Rebecca Johnston; Charline Labonté; Geneviève Lacasse; Jocelyne Larocque; Meaghan Mikkelson; Caroline Ouellette; Marie-Philip Poulin; Lauriane Rougeau; Natalie Spooner; Shannon Szabados; Jenn Wakefield; Catherine Ward; Tara Watchorn; Hayley Wickenheiser	United States; Kacey Bellamy; Megan Bozek; Alex Carpenter; Julie Chu; Kendall Coyne; Brianna Decker; Meghan Duggan; Lyndsey Fry; Amanda Kessel; Hilary Knight; Jocelyne Lamoureux; Monique Lamoureux; Gigi Marvin; Brianne McLaughlin; Michelle Picard; Josephine Pucci; Molly Schaus; Anne Schleper; Kelli Stack; Lee Stecklein; Jessie Vetter	Switzerland; Janine Alder; Livia Altmann; Sophie Anthamatten; Laura Benz; Sara Benz; Nicole Bullo; Romy Eggimann; Sarah Forster; Angela Frautschi; Jessica Lutz; Julia Marty; Stefanie Marty; Alina Müller; Katrin Nabholz; Evelina Raselli; Florence Schelling; Lara Stalder; Phoebe Stanz; Anja Stiefel; Nina Waidacher

Teemu Selänne of Finland accomplished several feats. As part of Team Finland's bronze achievement, he is the eldest ice hockey player Olympic medalist, at age 43 years and 234 days. He increased the Olympic record for total ice hockey points, to 43. He shares the record for most appearances in ice hockey at the Olympics, 2014 was his 6th Olympiad.

Sweden's Nicklas Bäckström's "A-sample" Olympic drug test detected the regulated drug pseudoephedrine; he was prevented from playing in the final. After the final, his "B-sample" detected a value that exceeded the limit.

== Men's tournament ==
The tournament featured 12 countries, 9 qualifying through the IIHF World Ranking, and 3 through subsequent qualifying tournaments. The format was the same as 2010; there were three groups of 4 to determine seeding, with four rounds of elimination games. Each group winner received a bye into the second round, along with the best second place team while the remaining eight teams played a qualification game. Each quarter-final winner advanced to the semis with the winners playing for the gold medal, and the losers the bronze.

=== Qualification ===
Qualification for the men's tournament at the 2014 Winter Olympics was determined by the IIHF World Ranking following the 2012 Men's World Ice Hockey Championships. The top nine teams in the World Ranking received automatic berths into the Olympics, while all other teams had an opportunity to qualify for the remaining three spots in the Olympics.

=== Participating nations ===
The twelve nations played in three pools.

Group A	Group B	Group C
Russia; Slovakia; United States; Slovenia	Finland; Canada; Norway; Austria	Czech Republic; Sweden; Switzerland; Latvia

== Women's tournament ==
The women's tournament ran from 8 to 20 February. Eight nations contested the gold. A new format was introduced, with the top 4 ranked teams in group A, with the next four in group B. The bottom two group A teams played the top 2 teams in group B in the quarter-finals, where the winners played either the first or second place team in group A.

=== Qualification ===
Qualification for the women's tournament at the 2014 Winter Olympics was determined by the IIHF World Ranking following the 2012 IIHF Women's World Championships. The top five teams in the World Ranking received automatic berths into the Olympics, Russia gained direct entry by being host and all other teams had an opportunity to qualify for the remaining two spots in the Olympics.

=== Participating nations ===
The eight nations played in two groups.

On 6 December 2017, six Russian ice hockey players were disqualified for doping violations; the team was disqualified. Tatiana Burina and Anna Shukina would be disqualified ten days later.

Group A	Group B
Canada; Finland; Switzerland; United States	Russia; Sweden; Germany; Japan
