= Sandra Thalmann =

Swiss ice hockey player

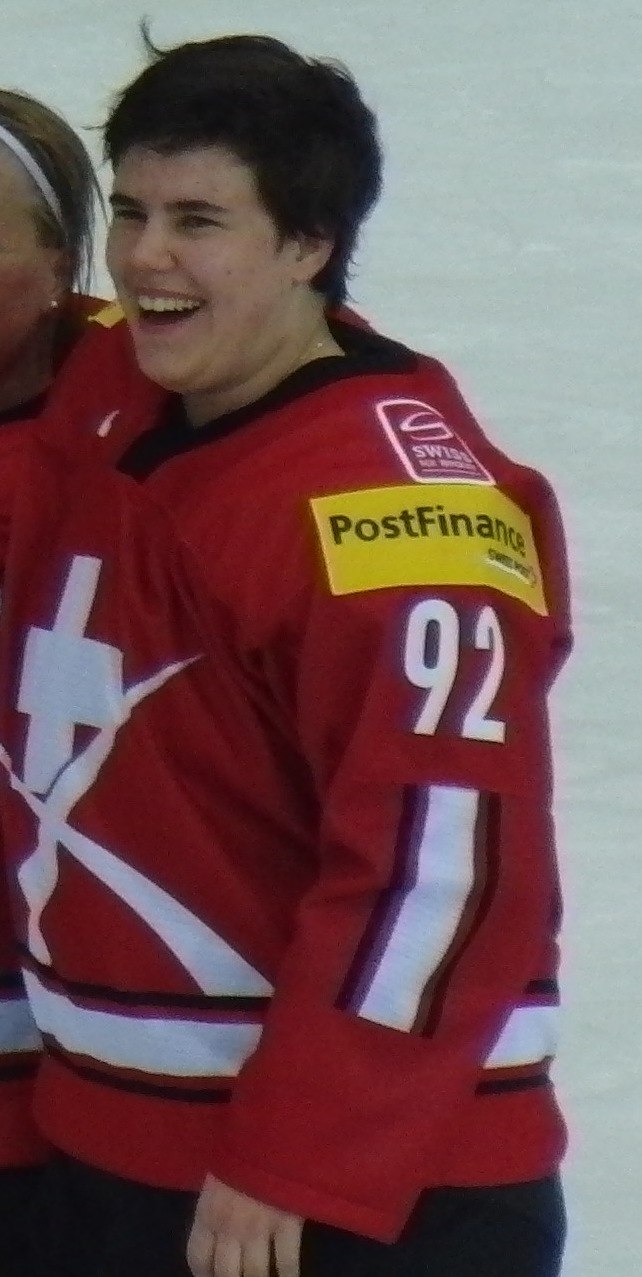
- Sandra Thalmann, 2011
- Born: 18 December 1992 (age 33) Basel, Switzerland
- Height: 5 ft 4 in (163 cm)
- Weight: 159 lb (72 kg; 11 st 5 lb)
- Position: Forward
- Shoots: Left
- LNA team Former teams: SC Reinach; DHC Langenthal
- National team: Switzerland
- Playing career: 2008–present
Medal record
Olympic Games
| Bronze medal – third place | 2014 Sochi | Team |
World Championships
| Bronze medal – third place | 2012 United States |

Sandra Thalmann (born 18 December 1992) is a Swiss ice hockey player.

== International career ==
Thalmann was selected for the Switzerland national women's ice hockey team in the 2010 Winter Olympics. She played in all five games, but did not register a point.

Thalmann has also appeared for Switzerland at four IIHF Women's World Championships. Her first appearance came in 2009. She was a member of the bronze medal-winning team at the 2012 championships.

Thalmann made two appearances for the Switzerland women's national under-18 ice hockey team at the IIHF World Women's U18 Championships. Her first came in 2008.

== Career statistics ==
| Year | Team | Event | GP | G | A | Pts | PIM |
|---|---|---|---|---|---|---|---|
| 2008 | Switzerland U18 | U18 | 5 | 1 | 0 | 1 | 12 |
| 2009 | Switzerland U18 | U18 | 5 | 1 | 2 | 3 | 36 |
| 2009 | Switzerland | WW | 4 | 0 | 0 | 0 | 8 |
| 2010 | Switzerland | Oly | 5 | 0 | 0 | 0 | 4 |
| 2011 | Switzerland | WW | 5 | 1 | 1 | 2 | 8 |
| 2012 | Switzerland | WW | 5 | 0 | 0 | 0 | 8 |
| 2013 | Switzerland | WW | 5 | 0 | 0 | 0 | 8 |
| 2014 | Switzerland | Oly | 5 | 0 | 0 | 0 | 0 |
| 2015 | Switzerland | WW | 5 | 0 | 0 | 0 | 0 |
