= Briercrest (disambiguation) =

Briercrest a village in the Canadian province of Saskatchewan.

Briercrest may also refer to:

- Briercrest Christian Academy, in Caronport, Saskatchewan, Canada
- Briercrest College and Seminary, in Caronport, Saskatchewan, Canada

== See also ==
- Briarcrest (disambiguation)
