= Green Mountain Glades =

- City: Williston, Vermont
- League: EJHL
- Operated: 2000-2012
- Home arena: Gutterson Fieldhouse and Cairns Arena
- Colors: Hunter green, golden yellow, and white

Franchise history
- 2000-2012: Green Mountain Glades
- 2012-2016: Portland Jr. Pirates

The Green Mountain Glades was a Tier III Junior A ice hockey team in the Eastern Junior Hockey League's North Division from 2000-2012.

== Overview ==
The team played its home games at Cairns Arena, a 600-seat arena in the suburb of South Burlington, Vermont, as well as the 4,003-seat Gutterson Fieldhouse on the campus of the University of Vermont on certain occasions.

The Green Mountain Glades organization also fielded a team in the Empire Junior B Hockey League as well as youth hockey select teams at the Bantam, Peewee, and Squirt levels.

== Notable alumni ==
- Matt Campanale
- Brock McGinn
- Zemgus Girgensons - 14th overall pick of the Buffalo Sabres in the 2012 NHL entry draft
