= Linnéa Bäckman =

Swedish ice hockey player (born 1991)

Linnèa Bäckman
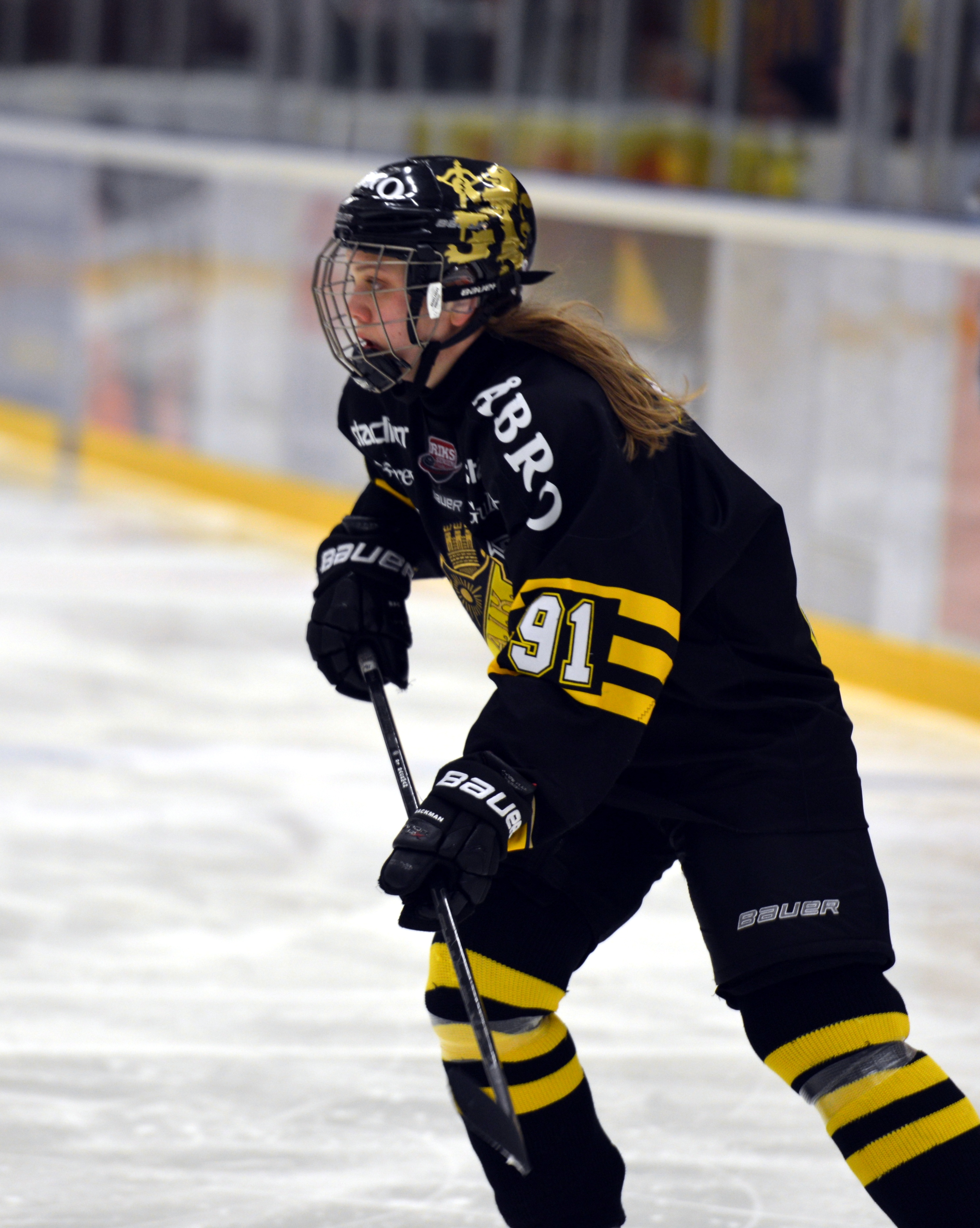
- Linnéa Bäckman; Swedish Championship final 1 in the finals in ice hockey for women in the 2014/2015 season between AIK Ice Hockey Women and Linköping's HC Women.
- Born: 18 April 1991 (age 34) Stockholm, Sweden
- Height: 166 cm (5 ft 5 in)
- Weight: 67 kg (148 lb; 10 st 8 lb)
- Position: Defence
- Shoots: Left
- SWHL team: AIK IF
- National team: Sweden
- Playing career: 2011–present

Linnéa Rebecka Emilia Bäckman (born 18 April 1991) is a Swedish ice hockey defender.

== International career ==
Bäckman was selected for the Sweden women's national ice hockey team in the 2014 Winter Olympics. She played in all six games, not recording a point.

As of 2014, Wester has also appeared for Sweden at three IIHF Women's World Championships. Her first appearance came in 2011.

As of 2014, Bäckman made two appearances for the Sweden women's national under-18 ice hockey team, at the IIHF World Women's U18 Championships in 2008 and 2009, including winning a bronze medal in the 2009 event.

== Career statistics ==
Through 2013–14 season

Year	Team	Event	GP	G	A	Pts	PIM
2008	Sweden U18	U18	5	0	0	0	0
2009	Sweden U18	U18	5	1	0	1	4
2011	Sweden	WW	5	0	1	1	6
2012	Sweden	WW	5	0	2	2	0
2013	Sweden	WW	5	1	0	1	4
2014	Sweden	Oly	6	0	0	0	0
