= Cairns Arena =

Arena in South Burlington, Vermont, US

Coordinates: 44.447323°N 73.17476°W

C. Douglas Cairns Recreation Arena
- Cairns Arena
- Interactive map of C. Douglas Cairns Recreation Arena
- Location: South Burlington, Vermont
- Owner: South Burlington Recreation Deprt.
- Capacity: 600 (hockey)
- Surface: 200x85 ft (hockey)

Tenant
- Saint Michael's College Women's Hockey (NEWHA); Saint Michael's College Men's Hockey (NE10); University of Vermont Club Hockey (NECHA)

C. Douglas Cairns Recreation Arena, more commonly known as Cairns Arena, is a 600-seat hockey arena in South Burlington, Vermont. It is home to the Saint Michael's College Purple Knights men's and women's ice hockey teams, the University of Vermont club ice hockey team, and a number of high school hockey teams. It was the former home to the Green Mountain Glades Junior A ice hockey team of the Eastern Junior Hockey League, who have since moved operations to Portland, Maine.

The Arena comprises two NHL-sized ice rinks, each with a seating capacity of 600, a café, and a pro shop. It also served as a venue for the 2012 IIHF Women's World Championship, along with Gutterson Fieldhouse.
