= 2011 IIHF Women's World Championship =

Tournament details
- Host country: Switzerland
- Cities: Zürich, Winterthur
- Venues: 2 (in 2 host cities)
- Dates: April 16–25
- Opened by: Micheline Calmy-Rey
- Teams: 8

Final positions
- Champions: United States (4th title)
- Runners-up: Canada
- Third place: Finland
- Fourth place: Russia

Tournament statistics
- Games played: 21
- Goals scored: 129 (6.14 per game)
- Attendance: 28,437 (1,354 per game)
- Scoring leader: (United States) Hilary Knight (14 points)

Awards
- MVP: (Slovakia) Zuzana Tomčíková

The 2011 IIHF Women's World Championship was the 13th edition of the Top Division of the Women's Ice Hockey World Championship (the 14th edition overall, if the season when only the lower divisions were played is also counted), organized by the International Ice Hockey Federation (IIHF).

The Top Division tournament was held at Hallenstadion in Zürich and at Deutweg rink in Winterthur, Switzerland, from 16 to 25 April 2011.

The United States were the two-time defending champions and successfully defended their title, capturing their third straight gold medal, by defeating Canada 3–2 in overtime on a goal by Hilary Knight. IIHF council member Monique Scheier-Schneider presided over the events.

== Top Division ==
=== Preliminary round ===
All times are local (Central European Summer Time – UTC+2).

==== Group A ====
Pos	Team	Pld	W	OTW	OTL	L	GF	GA	GD	Pts	Qualification
1	United States	3	3	0	0	0	27	2	+25	9	Semifinals
2	Sweden	3	2	0	0	1	11	10	+1	6	Quarterfinals
3	Russia	3	1	0	0	2	6	21	−15	3	Quarterfinals
4	Slovakia	3	0	0	0	3	1	12	−11	0	Relegation round

Source: IIHF

April 17, 2011; 12:00	United States	5–0 (0–0, 2–0, 3–0)	Slovakia	Hallenstadion; Attendance: 585

Game reference

Brianne McLaughlin
Goalies
Zuzana Tomčíková
Referee:
(Canada) Melanie Bordeleau

K. Coyne (M. Engstrom, H. Knight) – 23:50	1–0
J. Pucci (J. Lamoureux) – 28:18	2–0
H. Knight (B. Decker, C. Cahow) – 40:11	3–0
M. Duggan (J. Chu) – 40:19	4–0
B. Decker (H. Knight, K. Bellamy) – 47:27	5–0

10 min
Penalties
6 min
63
Shots
10

April 17, 2011; 16:00	Sweden	7–1 (3–1, 1–0, 3–0)	Russia	Hallenstadion; Attendance: 520

Game reference

Sara Grahn
Goalies
Anna Prugova
Valentina Ostrovlyanchik
Referee:
(United States) Erin Blair

E. Holst (D. Rundqvist) – 04:56	1–0
E. Holmlöv – 07:24	2–0
R. Stenberg (L. Bäckman, D. Rundqvist) – 08:45	3–0
	3–1	15:06 – A. Vafina
T. Enström (E. Holmlöv, E. Nordin) – 21:38	4–1
E. Grahm (G. Andersson, E. Holst) (PP2) – 40:18	5–1
F. Nevalainen (E. Holst, E. Grahm) – 45:53	6–1
A. Borgqvist (E. Holmlöv, J. Asserholt) – 58:46	7–1

14 min
Penalties
14 min
40
Shots
37

April 18, 2011; 12:00	Sweden	3–0 (1–0, 1–0, 1–0)	Slovakia	Hallenstadion; Attendance: 829

Game reference

Kim Martin
Goalies
Zuzana Tomčíková
Referee:
(United Kingdom) Joy Tottman

F. Nevalainen (E. Holst, E. Eliasson) (PP) – 05:53	1–0
P. Winberg (E. Holmlöv, T. Enström) – 38:34	2–0
E. Grahm (E. Holst, G. Andersson) (PP) – 53:39	3–0

10 min
Penalties
14 min
74
Shots
15

April 18, 2011; 16:00	Russia	1–13 (0–5, 1–3, 0–5)	United States	Hallenstadion; Attendance: 535

Game reference

Valentina Ostrovlyanchik
Goalies
Molly Schaus
Referee:
(Germany) Nicole Hertrich

	0–1	07:03 – H. Knight (M. Duggan, J. Chu) (PP)
	0–2	09:35 – A. Schleper (K. Coyne, B. Decker)
	0–3	10:42 – J. Chu (J. Schmidgall-Potter)
	0–4	12:14 – A. Ruggiero (B. Decker)
	0–5	15:21 – M. Duggan (SH)
	0–6	26:20 – C. Cahow (H. Knight, K. Coyne) (PP)
	0–7	31:33 – H. Knight (M. Duggan, J. Chu) (PP)
	0–8	31:56 – B. Decker (H. Knight)
Y. Lebedeva (S. Terentieva) – 39:59	1–8
	1–9	46:41 – H. Knight (J. Chu, M. Duggan) (PP)
	1–10	48:07 – K. Stack (G. Marvin, K. Steadman)
	1–11	50:35 – K. Coyne (H. Knight, M. Engstrom)
	1–12	51:55 – K. Bellamy (K. Stack, G. Marvin)
	1–13	55:40 – A. Ruggiero (B. Decker, G. Marvin) (PP)

18 min
Penalties
20 min
20
Shots
57

April 20, 2011; 14:00	Slovakia	1–4 (0–1, 0–0, 1–3)	Russia	Deutweg rink Attendance: 257

Game reference

Zuzana Tomčíková
Goalies
Anna Prugova
Referee:
(Norway) Aina Hove

	0–1	19:54 – T. Burina (M. Sergina, O. Permyakova) (SH)
	0–2	43:58 – Y. Smolentseva (I. Gavrilova, M. Sergina)
	0–3	47:11 – T. Burina (M. Sergina, G. Skiba)
	0–4	56:38 – A. Vafina (A. Kapustina) (SH)
J. Kapustova – 57:24	1–4

6 min
Penalties
12 min
19
Shots
52

April 20, 2011; 20:00	United States	9–1 (4–0, 5–0, 0–1)	Sweden	Deutweg rink Attendance: 748

Game reference

Jessie Vetter
Goalies
Sara Grahn
Kim Martin
Referee:
(Finland) Ulla Sipila

K. Stack (B. Decker) (PP) – 05:02	1–0
J. Schoullis (K. Steadman, J. Schmidgall-Potter) – 08:48	2–0
M. Lamoureux-Kolls (J. Lamoureux, K. Stack) – 11:30	3–0
J. Schmidgall-Potter (J. Chu, H. Knight) – 19:54	4–0
M. Duggan (H. Knight) (PP) – 23:34	5–0
J. Schoullis (J. Schmidgall-Potter) – 27:09	6–0
K. Coyne (C. Cahow) – 31:00	7–0
J. Lamoureux (M. Lamoureux-Kolls) – 33:10	8–0
M. Duggan (J. Chu, A. Schleper) – 39:10	9–0
	9–1	43:28 – E. Grahm (E. Holst, G. Andersson) (PP)

8 min
Penalties
10 min
51
Shots
17

==== Group B ====
Pos	Team	Pld	W	OTW	OTL	L	GF	GA	GD	Pts	Qualification
1	Canada	3	3	0	0	0	21	0	+21	9	Semifinals
2	Switzerland	3	1	1	0	1	8	14	−6	5	Quarterfinals
3	Finland	3	1	0	1	1	6	7	−1	4	Quarterfinals
4	Kazakhstan	3	0	0	0	3	4	18	−14	0	Relegation round

Source: IIHF

April 16, 2011; 16:00	Finland	5–3 (2–1, 2–0, 1–2)	Kazakhstan	Deutweg rink Attendance: 634

Game reference

Maija Hassinen
Goalies
Daria Obydennova
Referee:
(United Kingdom) Joy Tottman

P. Lund (T. Villila, S. Tapani) – 04:20	1–0
	1–1	06:22 – N. Yakovchuk (PP)
A. Rajahuhta (M. Tuominen, A. Helin) (PP) – 09:33	2–1
K. Rantamäki (M. Karvinen) – 24:01	3–1
S. Tapani – 39:15	4–1
	4–2	40:48 – N. Yakovchuk (O. Konysheva)
M. Karvinen (J. Hiirikoski) – 48:31	5–2
	5–3	49:44 – Z. Tukhtyeva (O. Konysheva

8 min
Penalties
4 min
62
Shots
15

April 16, 2011; 20:00	Canada	12–0 (3–0, 5–0, 4–0)	Switzerland	Deutweg rink Attendance: 2,900

Game reference

Charline Labonté
Goalies
Florence Schelling
Sophie Anthamatten
Referee:
(Germany) Nicole Hertrich

C. Piper (M. Agosta, B-J. Slusar) – 10:42	1–0
H. Irwin (R. Johnston, J. Larocque) (SH) – 16:02	2–0
H. Wickenheiser (M. Agosta) (SH) – 18:33	3–0
M. Mikkelson (H. Wickenheiser) – 23:01	4–0
G. Apps (T. Bonhomme) (PP) – 26:33	5–0
R. Johnston (T. Watchorn, H. Irwin) (PP) – 29:04	6–0
M-P. Poulin (S. Vaillancourt, C. Ward) – 34:30	7–0
J. Wakefield (T. Bonhomme) – 34:44	8–0
C. Piper (N. Spooner, T. Bonhomme) (PP) – 41:57	9–0
J. Hefford (M. Agosta) – 42:40	10–0
C. Piper – 54:29	11–0
T. Bonhomme (G. Apps, T. Watchorn) (PP) – 59:33	12–0

16 min
Penalties
14 min
67
Shots
19

April 17, 2011; 16:00	Kazakhstan	0–7 (0–2, 0–3, 0–2)	Canada	Deutweg rink Attendance: 411

Game reference

Daria Obydennova
Goalies
Kim St-Pierre
Referee:
(Finland) Ulla Sipila

0–1	09:22 – C. Ouellette (S. Vaillancourt, M-P. Poulin) (PP)
0–2	12:05 – H. Wickenheiser
0–3	20:55 – M-P. Poulin (C. Ouellette)
0–4	27:33 – M. Mikkelson
0–5	39:46 – M. Mikkelson (S. Vaillancourt, C. Ward) (PP)
0–6	43:42 – H. Irwin (R. Johnston, J. Larocque)
0–7	52:01 – N. Spooner

12 min
Penalties
2 min
13
Shots
71

April 17, 2011; 20:00	Finland	1–2 OT (1–0, 0–1, 0–0) (OT: 0–1)	Switzerland	Deutweg rink Attendance: 2,117

Game reference

Noora Räty
Goalies
Florence Schelling
Referee:
(Norway) Aina Hove

T. Niskanen (T. Saarimaki) – 05:51	1–0
	1–1	38:50 – N. Bullo (C. Meier, S. Benz) (PP)
	1–2	61:50 – S. Marty

16 min
Penalties
16 min
44
Shots
30

April 19, 2011; 16:00	Canada	2–0 (1–0, 0–0, 1–0)	Finland	Deutweg rink Attendance: 614

Game reference
Shannon Szabados	Goalies	Noora Räty	Referee: (United States) Erin Blair
R. Johnston (H. Irwin) – 12:46 / 1–0; J. Hefford (M. Agosta, H. Wickenheiser) (ENG) – 59:34 / 2–0			Referee: (United States) Erin Blair
8 min	Penalties	26 min	Referee: (United States) Erin Blair
50	Shots	14	Referee: (United States) Erin Blair

April 19, 2011; 20:00	Switzerland	6–1 (3–0, 1–0, 2–1)	Kazakhstan	Deutweg rink Attendance: 2,436

Game reference

Florence Schelling
Goalies
Daria Obydennova
Referee:
(Canada) Melanie Bordeleau

S. Thalmann (M. Hafliger) – 04:49	1–0
J. Marty (A. Stiefel, E. Raselli) – 06:37	2–0
D. Leimgruber (L. Stalder, K. Lehmann) – 18:14	3–0
D. Leimgruber (P. Stänz) – 32:31	4–0
	4–1	42:02 – N. Yakovchuk (G. Shu) (PP)
S. Benz (J. Marty) (SH) – 46:46	5–1
C. Meier (F. Schelling) (PP) – 57:06	6–1

14 min
Penalties
4 min
53
Shots
21

=== Relegation round ===
Best of three.

All times are local (Central European Summer Time – UTC+2).

April 22, 2011; 20:00	Slovakia	1–0 (0–0, 0–0, 1–0)	Kazakhstan	Deutweg rink Attendance: 127

Game reference
Zuzana Tomčíková	Goalies	Daria Obydennova	Referee: (Norway) Aina Hove
A. Dzurnakova (N. Gapova) – 47:59 / 1–0			Referee: (Norway) Aina Hove
0 min	Penalties	6 min	Referee: (Norway) Aina Hove
34	Shots	25	Referee: (Norway) Aina Hove

April 24, 2011; 20:00	Kazakhstan	1–2 GWS (1–0, 0–0, 0–1) (OT: 0–0) (SO: 0–1)	Slovakia	Deutweg rink Attendance: 113

Game reference
Daria Obydennova	Goalies	Zuzana Tomčíková	Referee: (Finland) Ulla Sipila
G. Shu (L. Sviridova, Y. Shtelmaister) – 10:46 / 1–0; / 1–1 / 53:55 – I. Karafiatova (M. Matejova) (PP)			Referee: (Finland) Ulla Sipila
L. Ibragimova (miss); O. Potapova (miss); Z. Tukhtyeva (miss)	Shootout	(miss) J. Kapustova; M. Velickova	Referee: (Finland) Ulla Sipila
12 min	Penalties	2 min	Referee: (Finland) Ulla Sipila
36	Shots	38	Referee: (Finland) Ulla Sipila

- Kazakhstan is relegated to the 2012 Division I A

=== Final round ===
Quarterfinals
A2	Sweden	1
B3	Finland	5
B2	Switzerland	4
A3	Russia	5

Semifinals
B1	Canada	4
B3	Finland	1
A1	United States	5
A3	Russia	1

Final
B1	Canada	2
A1	United States	3
Bronze medal game
B3	Finland	3
A3	Russia	2

==== Quarterfinals ====
April 22, 2011; 16:00	Sweden	1–5 (0–3, 0–1, 1–1)	Finland	Hallenstadion; Attendance: 931

Game reference

Kim Martin
Sara Grahn
Goalies
Noora Räty
Referee:
(Canada) Melanie Bordeleau

	0–1	01:42 – M. Karvinen (J. Hiirikoski)
	0–2	06:23 – M. Karvinen (K. Rantamäki, T. Niskanen)
	0–3	13:08 – A. Rajahuhta (M. Tuominen, S. Tapani)
	0–4	37:44– K. Rantamäki (M. Karvinen, T. Niskanen) (PP)
E. Holst (E. Grahm) (PP) – 43:43	1–4
	1–5	56:23 – K. Rantamäki (M. Karvinen, R. Lindstedt) (PP)

16 min
Penalties
12 min
39
Shots
32

April 22, 2011; 20:00	Switzerland	4–5 OT (1–0, 2–0, 1–4) (OT: 0–1)	Russia	Hallenstadion; Attendance: 4,123

Game reference

Florence Schelling
Goalies
Anna Prugova
Referee:
(United Kingdom) Joy Tottman

D. Leimgruber – 00:35	1–0
S. Benz (J. Marty, S. Marty) – 25:50	2–0
S. Benz – 33:33	3–0
	3–1	47:49 – Y. Smolentseva (A. Vafina)
	3–2	50:47 – O. Permyakova (I. Gavrilova, M. Sergina) (PP)
	3–3	52:01 – A. Kapustina (I. Gavrilova)
	3–4	54:21 – O. Sosina (A. Khomich) (PP)
S. Marty (A. Stiefel, L. Stalder) – 59:17	4–4
	4–5	62:58 – T. Burina

14 min
Penalties
10 min
44
Shots
33

==== Semifinals ====
April 23, 2011; 16:00	Canada	4–1 (2–1, 0–0, 2–0)	Finland	Hallenstadion; Attendance: 912

Game reference

Charline Labonté
Goalies
Noora Räty
Referee:
(United States) Erin Blair

R. Johnston (J. Wakefield) – 10:17	1–0
	1–1	11:43 – M. Karvinen (T. Niskanen, K. Rantamäki)
M-P. Poulin (C. Ouellette) – 19:04	2–1
J. Hefford (M. Agosta) – 40:43	3–1
H. Wickenheiser (B-J. Slusar, J. Hefford) (SH) – 48:18	4–1

8 min
Penalties
6 min
78
Shots
16

April 23, 2011; 20:00	United States	5–1 (2–1, 2–0, 1–0)	Russia	Hallenstadion; Attendance: 821

Game reference

Jessie Vetter
Goalies
Anna Prugova
Referee:
(Germany) Nicole Hertrich

	0–1	03:21 – I. Gavrilova (O. Sosina, Y. Smolentseva)
M. Lamoureux-Kolls (J. Lamoureux) – 11:31	1–1
K. Coyne (B. Decker, H. Knight) – 12:05	2–1
J. Lamoureux (M. Lamoureux-Kolls, B. Decker) – 24:08	3–1
B. Decker (C. Cahow, M. Lamoureux-Kolls) – 26:59 (PP)	4–1
B. Decker (M. Lamoureux-Kolls) – 52:18 (PP)	5–1

10 min
Penalties
10 min
68
Shots
14

==== 5th place playoff ====
April 24, 2011; 16:00	Sweden	3–2 GWS (2–2, 0–0, 0–0) (OT: 0–0) (SO: 1–0)	Switzerland	Hallenstadion; Attendance: 2,043

Game reference

Kim Martin
Goalies
Florence Schelling
Referee:
(United Kingdom) Joy Tottman

E. Eliasson (E. Holst, E. Grahm) (PP) – 05:04	1–0
T. Enström (E. Holmlöv, P. Winberg) – 08:22	2–0
	2–1	10:36 – A. Stiefel (S. Benz, S. Thalmann) (PP1)
	2–2	17:04 – N. Bullo (S. Zollinger)

E. Holst (miss)
P. Winberg (miss)
E. Holmlöv (miss)
E. Holmlöv
E. Holmlöv (miss)
E. Holst (miss)
E. Holmlöv
Shootout
(miss) K. Lehmann
(miss) S. Benz
(miss) N. Bullo
S. Marty
(miss) C. Meier
(miss) J. Marty
(miss) N. Bullo
28 min
Penalties
18 min
75
Shots
33

==== Bronze medal game ====
April 25, 2011; 16:00	Finland	3–2 OT (2–0, 0–1, 0–1) (OT: 1–0)	Russia	Hallenstadion; Attendance: 2,463

Game reference

Noora Räty
Goalies
Anna Prugova
Referee:
(Canada) Melanie Bordeleau

M. Tuominen – 14:15	1–0
M. Tuominen (E. Hallvar, A. Rajahuhta) – 21:18	2–0
	2–1	49:54 – I. Dyubanok (O. Sosina, M. Sergina)
	2–2	52:30 – M. Sergina (A. Kapustina, O. Permyakova) (PP)
K. Rantamäki (A. Helin, M. Karvinen) – 62:49	3–2

10 min
Penalties
12 min
49
Shots
37

==== Final ====
April 25, 2011; 20:00	Canada	2–3 OT (1–1, 0–1, 1–0) (OT: 0–1)	United States	Hallenstadion; Attendance: 4,318

Game reference

Shannon Szabados
Goalies
Jessica Vetter
Referee:
(Germany) Nicole Hertrich

	0–1	16:56 – J. Lamoureux (M. Lamoureux-Kolls)
G. Apps (N. Spooner, C. Piper) – 19:52	1–1
	1–2	32:01 – J. Schmidgall-Potter (A. Ruggiero, H. Knight)
R. Johnston (J. Hefford, J. Wakefield) (PP) – 56:04	2–2
	2–3	67:48 – H. Knight

10 min
Penalties
8 min
53
Shots
50

=== Final standings ===
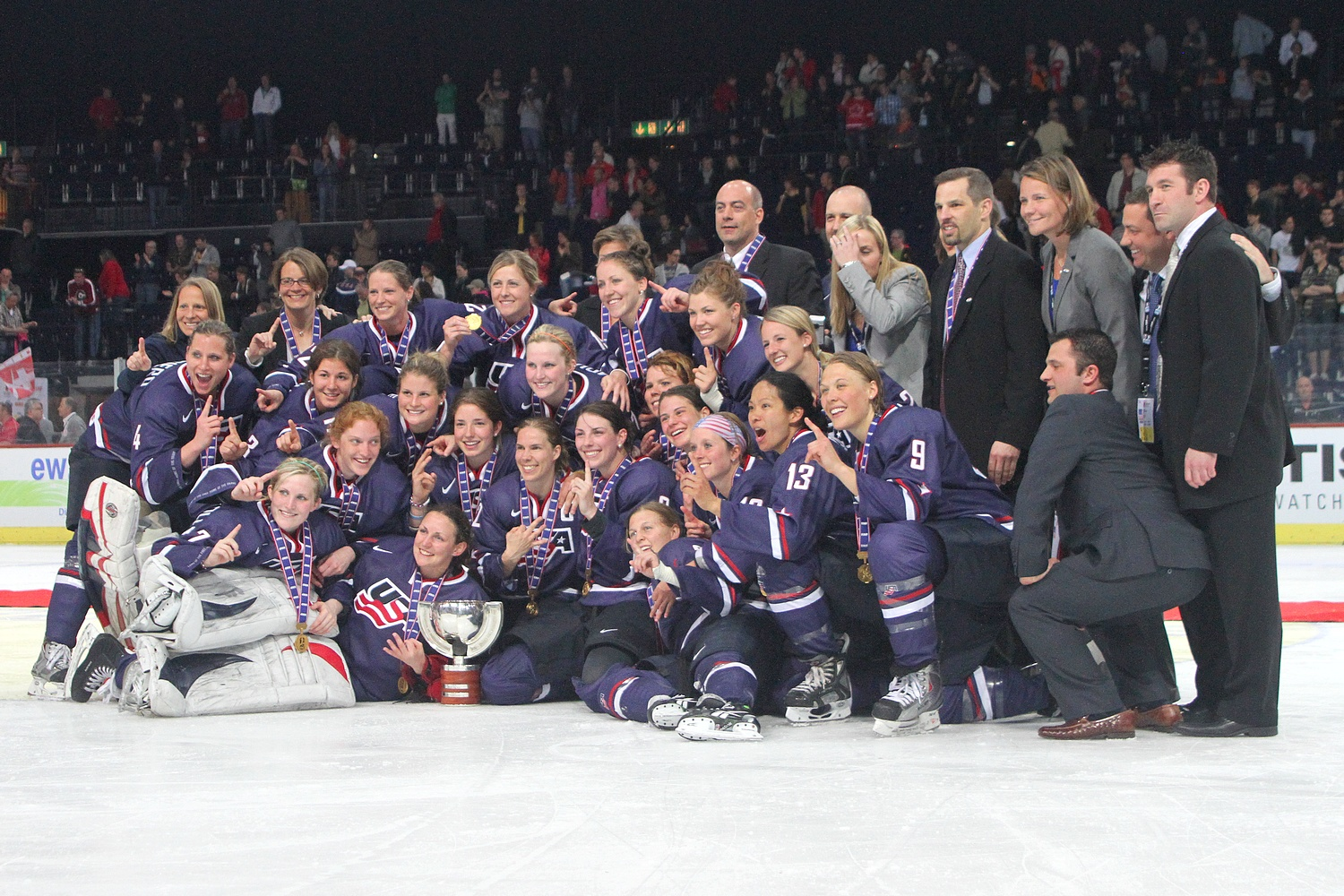
United States women's ice hockey team

Rank	Team
1st place, gold medalist(s)	United States
2nd place, silver medalist(s)	Canada
3rd place, bronze medalist(s)	Finland
4	Russia
5	Sweden
6	Switzerland
7	Slovakia
8	Kazakhstan

Relegated to the 2012 Division I A

=== Awards and statistics ===
==== Scoring leaders ====
List shows the top 10 skaters sorted by points, then goals.

Player	GP	G	A	Pts	+/−	PIM
(United States) Hilary Knight	5	5	9	14	+11	2
(United States) Brianna Decker	5	4	7	11	+10	8
(Finland) Michelle Karvinen	6	4	4	8	+2	8
(Sweden) Erika Holst	5	2	6	8	−2	2
(United States) Meghan Duggan	5	4	3	7	+5	2
(United States) Monique Lamoureux-Kolls	3	2	5	7	+3	6
(United States) Julie Chu	5	1	6	7	+6	0
(United States) Kendall Coyne	5	4	2	6	+9	0
(Canada) Rebecca Johnston	5	4	2	6	+5	0
(Finland) Karoliina Rantamäki	5	4	2	6	+1	4

GP = Games played; G = Goals; A = Assists; Pts = Points; +/− = Plus/minus; PIM = Penalties In Minutes
Source: IIHF.com

==== Leading goaltenders ====
Only the top five goaltenders, based on save percentage, who have played 40% of their team's minutes are included in this list.

Player	TOI	SA	GA	GAA	Sv%	SO
(Finland) Noora Räty	304:05	233	10	1.97	95.71	0
(Canada) Shannon Szabados	127:48	64	3	1.41	95.31	1
(United States) Jessica Vetter	187:48	84	4	1.28	95.24	0
(Slovakia) Zuzana Tomčíková	305:00	250	13	2.56	94.80	1
(Sweden) Kim Martin	208:28	86	6	1.73	93.02	1

TOI = Time on ice (minutes:seconds); SA = Shots against; GA = Goals against; GAA = Goals against average; Sv% = Save percentage; SO = Shutouts
Source: IIHF.com

==== Tournament Awards ====
- Media All-Stars
  - Goaltender: Zuzana Tomčíková (SVK)
  - Defense: Meaghan Mikkelson (CAN), Caitlin Cahow (USA)
  - Forwards: Hilary Knight (USA), Michelle Karvinen (FIN), Hayley Wickenheiser (CAN)
  - Most Valuable Player: Zuzana Tomčíková (SVK)
- Best players selected by the directorate:
  - Best Goaltender: Noora Räty (FIN)
  - Best Forward: Monique Lamoureux-Kolls (USA)
  - Best Defenceman: Meaghan Mikkelson (CAN)

==== Best players of each team ====
Best players of each team selected by the coaches.

Team	Players
Canada	Meaghan Mikkelson; Hayley Wickenheiser; Rebecca Johnston
Finland	Noora Räty; Jenni Hiirikoski; Karoliina Rantamäki
Kazakhstan	Daria Obydennova; Natalya Yakovchuk; Lyubov Ibragimova
Russia	Tatyana Burina; Iya Gavrilova; Yekaterina Smolentseva
Switzerland	Julia Marty; Nicole Bullo; Sara Benz
Slovakia	Zuzana Tomčíková; Iveta Karafiatova; Jana Kapustova
Sweden	Erika Holst; Elin Holmlöv; Gunilla Andersson
United States	Jessica Vetter; Brianna Decker; Caitlin Cahow

== Division I ==
The Division I tournament was played in Ravensburg, Germany, from April 11 to 16, 2011.

On March 29, 2011 Japan withdrew from the tournament due to the 2011 Japan earthquake. They retained their position in 2012's Division I, and the 5th-placed team was relegated.

Pos	Team	Pld	W	OTW	OTL	L	GF	GA	GD	Pts	Promotion, qualification or relegation
1	Germany (H)	4	4	0	0	0	12	2	+10	12	Promoted to the 2012 Top Division
2	Norway	4	3	0	0	1	13	7	+6	9	Qualified for the 2012 Division I A
3	Latvia	4	1	0	0	3	5	7	−2	3	Qualified for the 2012 Division I A
4	Austria	4	1	0	0	3	6	12	−6	3	Qualified for the 2012 Division I A
5	China	4	1	0	0	3	8	16	−8	3	Relegated to the 2012 Division I B
–	~~Japan~~	0	0	0	0	0	0	0	0	0	Withdrawn; qualified for the 2012 Division I A

Source: IIHF
(H) Host

== Division II ==
The Division II tournament was played in Caen, France, from April 4 to 10, 2011.

Prior to the start of the tournament the North Korean national team announced they would withdraw, citing financial reasons. All games against them were counted as a forfeit, with a score of 5–0 for the opposing team.

Pos	Team	Pld	W	OTW	OTL	L	GF	GA	GD	Pts	Promotion, qualification or relegation
1	Czech Republic	5	5	0	0	0	23	2	+21	15	Promoted to the 2012 Division I A
2	France (H)	5	4	0	0	1	13	5	+8	12	Qualified for the 2012 Division I B
3	Denmark	5	3	0	0	2	17	12	+5	9	Qualified for the 2012 Division I B
4	Italy	5	2	0	0	3	11	9	+2	6	Qualified for the 2012 Division I B
5	Great Britain	5	1	0	0	4	10	21	−11	3	Qualified for the 2012 Division I B
6	~~North Korea~~	5	0	0	0	5	0	25	−25	0	Withdrawn; relegated to the 2012 Division II A

Source: IIHF
(H) Host

== Division III ==
The Division III tournament was played in Newcastle, Australia, from February 1 to 6, 2011.

Pos	Team	Pld	W	OTW	OTL	L	GF	GA	GD	Pts	Promotion, qualification or relegation
1	Netherlands	5	4	1	0	0	33	4	+29	14	Promoted to the 2012 Division I B
2	Australia (H)	5	4	0	1	0	22	9	+13	13	Qualified for the 2012 Division II A
3	Hungary	5	2	1	0	2	27	11	+16	8	Qualified for the 2012 Division II A
4	Slovenia	5	2	0	1	2	19	16	+3	7	Qualified for the 2012 Division II A
5	Croatia	5	1	0	0	4	5	29	−24	3	Qualified for the 2012 Division II A
6	Belgium	5	0	0	0	5	3	40	−37	0	Relegated to the 2012 Division II B

Source: IIHF
(H) Host

== Division IV ==
The Division IV tournament was played in Reykjavík, Iceland, from March 29 to April 4, 2011.

Pos	Team	Pld	W	OTW	OTL	L	GF	GA	GD	Pts	Promotion, qualification or relegation
1	New Zealand	4	4	0	0	0	20	6	+14	12	Promoted to the 2012 Division II A
2	South Korea	4	3	0	0	1	15	6	+9	9	Qualified for the 2012 Division II B
3	Iceland (H)	4	2	0	0	2	10	10	0	6	Qualified for the 2012 Division II B
4	Romania	4	1	0	0	3	9	15	−6	3	Did not participate in 2012
5	South Africa	4	0	0	0	4	4	21	−17	0	Qualified for the 2012 Division II B
–	~~Estonia~~	0	0	0	0	0	0	0	0	0	Withdrawn; did not participate in 2012

Source: IIHF
(H) Host

== Division V ==
The Division V tournament was played in Sofia, Bulgaria, from March 14 to 19, 2011.

Poland was promoted to Division IV (renamed II B) for the 2012 IIHF Women's World Championship. In addition, because of some nations not participating, Spain instead of hosting the Division II B Qualification, effectively were promoted as well.

Pos	Team	Pld	W	OTW	OTL	L	GF	GA	GD	Pts	Promotion or relegation
1	Poland	4	3	1	0	0	61	4	+57	11	Promoted to the 2012 Division II B
2	Spain	4	3	0	1	0	32	5	+27	10	Promoted to the 2012 Division II B
3	Bulgaria (H)	4	2	0	0	2	5	27	−22	6	Did not participate in 2012
4	Turkey	4	1	0	0	3	4	23	−19	3	Did not participate in 2012
5	Ireland	4	0	0	0	4	0	43	−43	0	Did not participate in 2012

Source: IIHF
(H) Host
