= 2012 IIHF Women's World Championship =

International ice hockey tournament

Tournament details
- Host country: United States
- Venues: 2 (in 1 host city)
- Dates: April 7–14, 2012
- Opened by: Barack Obama
- Teams: 8

Final positions
- Champions: Canada (10th title)
- Runners-up: United States
- Third place: Switzerland
- Fourth place: Finland

Tournament statistics
- Games played: 21
- Goals scored: 141 (6.71 per game)
- Attendance: 27,791 (1,323 per game)
- Scoring leader: (United States) Monique Lamoureux-Kolls (14 points)

The 2012 IIHF Women's World Championship was the 14th edition of the Top Division of the Women's Ice Hockey World Championship (the 15th edition overall, if the season when only the lower divisions were played is also counted), organized by the International Ice Hockey Federation (IIHF).

The Top Division tournament took place in Vermont, United States, at the Gutterson Fieldhouse in Burlington, and the Cairns Arena in South Burlington, from April 7 to 14, 2012, and was hosted by USA Hockey. The competition also served as qualifications for the 2013 competition, and the 2014 Olympics.

Canada won their record-extending tenth title by defeating the three-time defending champions United States 5–4 in overtime. Caroline Ouellette scored the decisive goal. The Americans defeated the Canadians 9–2 in the group stage earlier in the tournament. The Swiss team, by finishing third, captured their first ever Women's World Championship medal.

== Top Division ==
The Top Division was contested between eight teams from April 7 to April 14, 2012. The event was hosted by USA Hockey in Burlington, Vermont. A new format was used where the top four ranked teams were placed in Group A and were automatically qualified for the final round, and played in the preliminary round was only used to determine seeding for the next round. The top two teams received a bye into the semifinals. Meanwhile, the next four teams played the preliminary round in Group B. The top two teams from Group B joined the others for the final round, while the bottom two team played a best-of-three series, with the loser being relegated next year.

Group A

- United States
- Canada
- Finland
- Russia

Group B

- Sweden
- Switzerland
- Slovakia
- Germany — promoted from 2011 Division I

=== Rosters ===
Each team's roster for the 2012 IIHF Women's World Championship consisted of at least 15 skaters (forwards, and defencemen) and 2 goaltenders, and at most 20 skaters and 3 goaltenders. All eight participating nations, through the confirmation of their respective national associations, had to submit a roster by the first IIHF directorate meeting on 6 April 2012.

=== Preliminary round ===
All times are local (Eastern Time Zone – UTC−4).

==== Group A ====
Pos	Team	Pld	W	OTW	OTL	L	GF	GA	GD	Pts	Qualification
1	United States	3	3	0	0	0	29	2	+27	9	Semifinals
2	Canada	3	2	0	0	1	19	12	+7	6	Semifinals
3	Finland	3	1	0	0	2	7	18	−11	3	Quarterfinals
4	Russia	3	0	0	0	3	5	28	−23	0	Quarterfinals

Source: IIHF

April 7, 2012; 15:00	Finland	5–4 (0–2, 2–0, 3–2)	Russia	Gutterson Fieldhouse, Vermont; Attendance: 1,494

Game reference

Meeri Räisänen
Goalies
Anna Prugova
Referee:
(United Kingdom) Joy Tottman
Linesmen:
(United States) Alicia Hanrahan
(Slovakia) Michaela Kudelova

	0–1	03:42 – G. Skiba (A. Shukina)
	0–2	18:30 – I. Dyubanok (T. Burina, I. Gavrilova) (PP)
R. Lindstedt (T. Villila) (PP) – 29:59	1–2
K. Rantamaki (M. Karvinen, J. Hiirikoski) – 38:08	2–2
N. Tikkinen (T. Mertanen) – 41:25	3–2
	3–3	42:01 – Y. Lebedeva
N. Tikkinen (V. Hovi) – 50:24	4–3
K. Rantamaki (J. Hiirikoski) – 51:05	5–3
	5–4	53:52 – T. Burina (I. Gavrilova, M. Sergina)

6 min
Penalties
16 min
30
Shots
17

April 7, 2012; 19:00	United States	9–2 (5–0, 1–2, 3–0)	Canada	Gutterson Fieldhouse, Vermont; Attendance: 3,970

Game reference

Molly Schaus
Goalies
Charline Labonté
Shannon Szabados
Referee:
(Norway) Aina Hove
Linesmen:
(Sweden) Therese Bjorkman
(France) Anne Sophie Boniface

J. Lamoureux (K. Stack, M. Lamoureux-Kolls) – 00:37	1–0
H. Knight (B. Decker) – 01:24	2–0
M. Lamoureux-Kolls (G. Marvin) (PP) – 03:32	3–0
J. Chu (H. Knight) (PP) – 04:52	4–0
M. Lamoureux-Kolls (K. Stack) – 05:32	5–0
	5–1	20:39 – N. Spooner (C. Ouellette, H. Wickenheiser)
J. Lamoureux (M. Bozek, M. Lamoureux-Kolls) – 23:10	6–1
	6–2	37:03 – M.-P. Poulin (J. Hefford, R. Johnston)
J. Pucci (M. Lamoureux-Kolls) – 45:29	7–2
H. Knight (J. Potter) – 47:38	8–2
M. Lamoureux-Kolls (G. Marvin, K. Stack) (PP) – 51:17	9–2

6 min
Penalties
14 min
33
Shots
21

April 8, 2012; 15:00	Canada	3–2 (1–0, 1–1, 1–1)	Finland	Gutterson Fieldhouse, Vermont; Attendance: 1,499

Game reference

Shannon Szabados
Goalies
Noora Räty
Referee:
(France) Marie Picavet
Linesmen:
(Germany) Judith Adler
(United States) Laura Johnson

L. Fortino (R. Johnston, H. Wickenheiser) – 14:12	1–0
C. Ouellette (J. Hefford, M-P. Poulin) – 20:13	2–0
	2–1	33:50 – V. Hovi (M. Karvinen) (SH)
G. Apps (M. Mikkelson, M. Agosta) – 49:14	3–1
	3–2	50:28 – K. Rantamäki (M. Karvinen, J. Hiirokoski) (PP)

14 min
Penalties
12 min
43
Shots
15

April 8, 2012; 19:00	United States	9–0 (2–0, 2–0, 5–0)	Russia	Gutterson Fieldhouse, Vermont; Attendance: 2,242

Game reference

Jessie Vetter
Goalies
Anna Prugova
Valentina Ostrovlyanchik
Referee:
(Germany) Nicole Hertrich
Linesmen:
(Canada) Denise Caughey
(Finland) Johanna Tauriainen

H. Knight (K. Stack, L. Chesson) – 01:42	1–0
A. Kessel (K. Coyne, B. Decker) – 13:37	2–0
M. Lamoureux-Kolls (J. Potter) (SH) – 25:18	3–0
A. Kessel (B. Decker, K. Coyne) – 39:03	4–0
H. Knight (M. Bozek) – 40:54	5–0
M. Bozek (M. Lamoureux-Kolls, K. Stack) – 43:36	6–0
J. Lamoureux (K. Stack) (PP) – 46:51	7–0
K. Coyne (A. Kessel) (PP) – 52:46	8–0
B. Decker (K. Coyne) (PP) – 55:46	9–0

6 min
Penalties
16 min
54
Shots
5

April 10, 2012; 15:00	Canada	14–1 (6–0, 5–0, 3–1)	Russia	Gutterson Fieldhouse, Vermont; Attendance: 643

Game reference

Charline Labonté
Goalies
Valentina Ostrovlyanchik
Margarita Monakhova
Referee:
(United States) Dina Allen
Linesmen:
(Germany) Judith Adler
(France) Anne Sophie Boniface

M-P. Poulin (C. Ouellette, J. Hefford) – 03:55	1–0
H. Wickenheiser (C. Ouellette, C. Ward) (PP) – 07:14	2–0
N. Spooner (R. Johnston, H. Wickenheiser) – 09:44	3–0
J. Hefford (M-P. Poulin, L. Fortino) – 13:23	4–0
M. Agosta (PS) – 14:56	5–0
N. Spooner (H. Wickenheiser, R. Johnston) – 19:00	6–0
N. Spooner (R. Johnston, H. Wickenheiser) – 28:02	7–0
G. Apps (V. Bendus, T. Bonhomme) – 29:10	8–0
L. Rougeau (N. Spooner, R. Johnston) (PP) – 31:10	9–0
M. Agosta (L. Rougeau, M. Mikkelson) (PP) – 34:28	10–0
J. Wakefield (B. Bram, M. Mikkelson) – 37:16	11–0
R. Johnston (H. Wickenheiser, J. Larocque) – 43:35	12–0
H. Wickenheiser (J. Hefford, M. Mikkelson) – 45:52	13–0
	13–1	49:00 – A. Goncharenko (V. Pavlova, G. Skiba) (PP)
J. Hefford (C. Ouellette, M-P. Poulin) – 53:35	14–1

14 min
Penalties
16 min
41
Shots
7

April 10, 2012; 19:00	Finland	0–11 (0–2, 0–6, 0–3)	United States	Gutterson Fieldhouse, Vermont; Attendance: 2,356

Game reference

Isabella Portnoj
Meeri Räisänen
Goalies
Brianne McLaughlin
Referee:
(Canada) Melanie Bordeleau
Linesmen:
(Czech Republic) Zuzana Arazimova
(Slovakia) Michaela Kudelova

0–1	06:24 – M. Lamoureux-Kolls (G. Marvin, K. Stack (PP)
0–2	11:47 – K. Stack (M. Lamoureux-Kolls, L. Chesson)
0–3	23:05 – H. Knight (B. Decker, A. Schleper)
0–4	24:51 – K. Stack (M. Lamoureux-Kolls, J. Lamoureux)
0–5	25:25 – M. Lamoureux-Kolls
0–6	25:50 – B. Decker (A. Kessel)
0–7	32:16 – K. Stack (J. Lamoureux, M. Lamoureux-Kolls) (PP)
0–8	35:05 – J. Pucci (K. Stack, G. Marvin) (PP2)
0–9	42:53 – K. Coyne (M. Bozek) (PP)
0–10	46:06 – M. Lamoureux-Kolls (J. Lamoureux, K. Stack)
0–11	52:07 – A. Kessel (K. Stack)

18 min
Penalties
6 min
9
Shots
54

==== Group B ====
Pos	Team	Pld	W	OTW	OTL	L	GF	GA	GD	Pts	Qualification
1	Switzerland	3	2	0	0	1	7	6	+1	6	Quarterfinals
2	Sweden	3	1	1	0	1	9	5	+4	5	Quarterfinals
3	Germany	3	1	0	1	1	6	8	−2	4	Relegation round
4	Slovakia	3	1	0	0	2	6	9	−3	3	Relegation round

Source: IIHF

April 7, 2012; 13:00	Slovakia	1–5 (0–1, 1–1, 0–3)	Sweden	Cairns Arena, Vermont; Attendance: 243

Game reference

Zuzana Tomčíková
Goalies
Kim Martin
Referee:
(France) Marie Picavet
Linesmen:
(Czech Republic) Zuzana Arazimová
(Canada) Denise Caughey

	0–1	18:51 – E. Holmlöv (M. Lowenhielm, E. Holst) (PP)
I. Karafiátová (J. Kapustová, N.Čupková) (PP) – 21:20	1–1
	1–2	30:25 – A. Svedin (L. Backman, E. Holmlöv)
	1–3	47:41 – J. Asserholt (F. Nevalainen, E. Holst)
	1–4	51:44 – J. Olofsson (L. Wester, E. Grahm)
	1–5	52:59 – E. Uden-Johansson (J. Fallmen, K. Myrén)

6 min
Penalties
8 min
16
Shots
39

April 7, 2012; 17:00	Switzerland	2–3 (1–1, 1–2, 0–0)	Germany	Cairns Arena, Vermont; Attendance: 277

Game reference

Sophie Anthamatten
Goalies
Viona Harrer
Referee:
(United States) Dina Allen
Linesmen:
(United States) Laura Johnson
(Finland) Johanna Tauriainen

	0–1	16:49 – M. Bittner
J. Marty (M. Steck, S. Zollinger) – 19:46	1–1
	1–2	22:11 – S. Weyand (S. Gotz, S. Seiler)
	1–3	37:32 – J. Zorn (S. Gotz, F. Busch) (PP)
N. Bullo (D. Leimgruber, S. Marty) – 38:05	2–3

10 min
Penalties
10 min
34
Shots
25

April 8, 2012; 13:00	Sweden	2–1 OT (0–0, 0–0, 1–1) (OT: 1–0)	Germany	Cairns Arena, Vermont; Attendance: 342

Game reference

Kim Martin
Goalies
Jennifer Harß
Referee:
(United Kingdom) Joy Tottman
Linesmen:
(Czech Republic) Zuzana Arazimová
(United States) Alicia Hanrahan

E. Holst (F. Nevalainen, P. Winberg) (PP) – 46:53	1–0
	1–1	59:12 – A. Lanzl (J. Zorn)
E. Holmlöv (J. Asserholt, L. Backman) (PP) – 60:24	2–1

18 min
Penalties
8 min
40
Shots
18

April 8, 2012; 17:00	Switzerland	2–1 (1–0, 0–1, 1–0)	Slovakia	Cairns Arena, Vermont; Attendance: 200

Game reference

Florence Schelling
Goalies
Zuzana Tomčíková
Referee:
(Canada) Melanie Bordeleau
Linesmen:
(Sweden) Therese Bjorkman
(France) Anne Sophie Boniface

D. Leimgruber (S. Marty, N. Bullo) – 08:35	1–0
	1–1	25:32 – J. Kapustová (M. Herichová)
J. Marty – 43:25	2–1

12 min
Penalties
12 min
27
Shots
30

April 10, 2012; 13:00	Sweden	2–3 (1–1, 0–0, 1–2)	Switzerland	Cairns Arena, Vermont; Attendance: 325

Game reference

Kim Martin
Goalies
Florence Schelling
Referee:
(Germany) Nicole Hertrich
Linesmen:
(Canada) Denise Caughey
(United States) Laura Johnson

J. Asserholt (P. Winberg, E. Holst) (PP) – 04:16	1–0
	1–1	14:52 – K. Lehmann (S. Benz, S. Marty) (PP)
	1–2	42:42 – J. Marty (D. Leimgruber, K. Lehmann)
E. Holst (J. Asserholt) – 48:55	2–2
	2–3	56:52 – S. Benz (A. Steifel) (PP)

10 min
Penalties
12 min
51
Shots
26

April 10, 2012; 17:00	Germany	2–4 (0–1, 1–2, 1–1)	Slovakia	Cairns Arena, Vermont; Attendance: 237

Game reference

Viona Harrer
Goalies
Zuzana Tomčíková
Referee:
(Norway) Aina Hove
Linesmen:
(United States) Alicia Hanrahan
(Finland) Johanna Tauriainen

	0–1	18:29 – N. Čupková (I. Karafiátová)
	0–2	24:10 – M. Veličková (M. Herichová)
	0–3	31:11 – J. Kapustová (N. Čupková)
L. Schuster (N. Kamenik) (PP) – 39:50	1–3
B. Evers (S. Fellner) – 43:56	2–3
	2–4	49:39 – N. Čupková (J. Kapustová) (PP2)

6 min
Penalties
6 min
36
Shots
28

=== Relegation round ===
Best of three.

All times are local (Eastern Time Zone – UTC−4).

April 11, 2012; 17:00	Germany	2–1 GWS (0–1, 1–0, 0–0) (OT: 0–0) (SO: 1–0)	Slovakia	Cairns Arena, Vermont; Attendance: 174

Game reference
Viona Harrer	Goalies	Zuzana Tomčíková	Referee: (Canada) Melanie Bordeleau; Linesmen: (Czech Republic) Zuzana Arazimova (Finland) Johanna Tauriainen
/ 0–1 / 05:31 – M. Veličková (N. Čupková) (PP); J. Zorn (F. Busch) – 27:57 / 1–1			Referee: (Canada) Melanie Bordeleau; Linesmen: (Czech Republic) Zuzana Arazimova (Finland) Johanna Tauriainen
M. Anwander (miss); A. Lanzl; J. Zorn (miss); M. Anwander	Shootout	J. Kapustová; (miss) N. Čupková; (miss) M. Veličková; (miss) J. Kapustová	Referee: (Canada) Melanie Bordeleau; Linesmen: (Czech Republic) Zuzana Arazimova (Finland) Johanna Tauriainen
12 min	Penalties	10 min	Referee: (Canada) Melanie Bordeleau; Linesmen: (Czech Republic) Zuzana Arazimova (Finland) Johanna Tauriainen
40	Shots	20	Referee: (Canada) Melanie Bordeleau; Linesmen: (Czech Republic) Zuzana Arazimova (Finland) Johanna Tauriainen

April 13, 2012; 13:00	Slovakia	1–3 (0–1, 0–1, 1–1)	Germany	Cairns Arena, Vermont; Attendance: 187

Game reference

Zuzana Tomčíková
Goalies
Jennifer Harss
Referee:
(France) Marie Picavet
Linesmen:
(United States) Alicia Hanrahan
(United States) Laura Johnson

	0–1	04:20 – J. Zorn (SH)
	0–2	38:17 – M. Anwander (S. Gotz)
N. Čupková (J. Kapustová) – 46:45	1–2
	1–3	54:02 – T. Eisenschmid (S. Fellner) (SH)

4 min
Penalties
10 min
29
Shots
35

- The third game of the relegation series was cancelled because Germany won both meetings and Slovakia is therefore relegated to the 2013 Division I A.

=== Final round ===
Quarterfinals
A4	Russia	2
B1	Switzerland	5
A3	Finland	2
B2	Sweden	1

Semifinals
A1	United States	10
B1	Switzerland	0
A2	Canada	5
A3	Finland	1

Final
A1	United States	4
A2	Canada	5
Bronze medal game
A3	Finland	2
B1	Switzerland	6

All times are local (Eastern Time Zone – UTC−4).

==== Quarterfinals ====
April 11, 2012; 15:00	Russia	2–5 (1–2, 1–3, 0–0)	Switzerland	Gutterson Fieldhouse, Vermont; Attendance: 1,340

Game reference

Anna Prugova
Goalies
Florence Schelling
Referee:
(France) Marie Picavet
Linesmen:
(Germany) Judith Adler
(Sweden) Therese Bjorkman

T. Burina (Y. Dyupina, I. Dyubanok) – 02:24	1–0
	1–1	16:15 – S. Marty (A. Frautschi, J. Marty) (PP2)
	1–2	19:34 – P. Stanz (SH)
	1–3	22:41 – J. Marty (N. Bullo, D. Leimgruber)
T. Burina (I. Gavrilova, Inna Dyubanok) – 27:21	2–3
	2–4	29:40 – E. Raselli (S. Benz, A. Frautschi) (PP)
	2–5	37:21 – S. Marty (K. Lehmann)

20 min
Penalties
16 min
34
Shots
31

April 11, 2012; 19:00	Finland	2–1 (2–0, 0–0, 0–1)	Sweden	Gutterson Fieldhouse, Vermont; Attendance: 1,633

Game reference

Noora Räty
Goalies
Sara Grahn
Referee:
(United States) Dina Allen
Linesmen:
(Canada) Denise Caughey
(Slovakia) Michaela Kudelova

K. Rantamäki (A. Helin) – 00:21	1–0
S. Tapani (M. Karvinen, E. Hallvar) – 16:58	2–0
	2–1	53:04 – E. Holmlov (P. Winberg, J. Asserholt)

16 min
Penalties
10 min
26
Shots
44

==== Semifinals ====
April 13, 2012; 15:00	Canada	5–1 (2–0, 1–1, 2–0)	Finland	Gutterson Fieldhouse, Vermont; Attendance: 1,750

Game reference

Shannon Szabados
Goalies
Noora Räty
Referee:
(Germany) Nicole Hertrich
Linesmen:
(Sweden) Therese Bjorkman
(Slovakia) Michaela Kudelova

C. Ouelette (M.-P. Poulin, C. Ward) – 03:32	1–0
L. Fortino (M. Agosta, N. Spooner) – 04:53	2–0
M. Agosta (B. Jenner, G. Apps) – 22:06	3–0
	3–1	30:30 – K. Rantamäki (S. Tarkki, J. Hiirikoski) (PP)
M.-P. Poulin (J. Hefford, L. Fortino) – 52:12	4–1
C. Birchard (G. Apps, M. Mikkelson) (PP) – 58:40	5–1

14 min
Penalties
4 min
43
Shots
15

April 13, 2012; 19:00	United States	10–0 (3–0, 3–0, 4–0)	Switzerland	Gutterson Fieldhouse, Vermont; Attendance: 2,211

Game reference

Molly Schaus
Goalies
Florence Schelling
Sophie Anthamatten
Referee:
(United Kingdom) Joy Tottman
Linesmen:
(Czech Republic) Zuzana Arazimová
(France) Anne Sophie Boniface

K. Stack (G. Marvin, J. Lamoureux) (PP) – 02:52	1–0
K. Stack (SH) – 09:09	2–0
B. Decker (A. Kessel, K. Coyne) – 16:41	3–0
J. Chu (H. Knight, G. Marvin) – 22:16	4–0
K. Coyne (A. Kessel, J. Pucci) – 29:01	5–0
G. Marvin (PP) – 35:13	6–0
M. Bozek (A. Kessel, K. Coyne) – 44:56	7–0
J. Pucci (J. Chu, L. Chesson) – 45:24	8–0
E. Lawler (J. Pucci) – 45:45	9–0
J. Lamoureux (M Picard, J. Pucci) – 49:31	10–0

6 min
Penalties
8 min
80
Shots
10

==== Fifth place game ====
April 13, 2012; 17:00	Russia	1–2 OT (0–1, 0–0, 1–0) (OT: 0–1)	Sweden	Cairns Arena, Vermont; Attendance: 261

Game reference

Anna Prugova
Goalies
Sara Grahn
Referee:
(Norway) Aina Hove
Linesmen:
(Germany) Judith Adler
(Canada) Denise Caughey

	0–1	15:08 – P. Winberg (E. Holmlöv, J. Asserholt) (PP)
M. Sergina – 49:28	1–1
	1–2	E. Holmlöv (J. Asserholt) – 60:34

6 min
Penalties
4 min
28
Shots
24

==== Bronze medal game ====
April 14, 2012; 15:00	Switzerland	6–2 (2–2, 1–0, 3–0)	Finland	Gutterson Fieldhouse, Vermont; Attendance: 2,400

Game reference

Florence Schelling
Goalies
Noora Räty
Meeri Raisanen
Referee:
(United States) Dina Allen
Linesmen:
(Czech Republic) Zuzana Arazimova
(Sweden) Therese Bjorkman

	0–1	04:48 – A. Rajahuhta (M. Jalosuo, T. Mertanen) (PP)
K. Nabholz (A. Stiefel, J. Marty) – 11:25	1–1
	1–2	17:27 – A. Helin (M. Karvinen, B. Hovi) (PP2)
S. Benz (K. Lehmann, S. Marty) – 19:59	2–2
S. Zollinger (J. Marty, S. Marty) (PP) – 29:37	3–2
K. Lehmann – 50:29	4–2
A. Stiefel (K. Nabholz) – 53:50	5–2
E. Raselli (P. Stanz) – 55:28	6–2

10 min
Penalties
4 min
25
Shots
52

==== Final ====
April 14, 2012; 19:00	United States	4–5 OT (1–1, 2–2, 1–1) (OT: 0–1)	Canada	Gutterson Fieldhouse, Vermont; Attendance: 4,007

Game reference

Molly Schaus
Goalies
Shannon Szabados
Referee:
(Canada) Melanie Bordeleau
Linesmen:
(United States) Alicia Hanrahan
(Finland) Johanna Tauriainen

	0–1	07:52 – H. Wickenheiser (SH)
K. Coyne (A. Kessel, B. Decker) – 12:54	1–1
	1–2	24:07 – J. Hefford (M. Agosta, H. Wickenheiser) (PP)
	1–3	25:36 – C. Ouellette
B. Decker (M. Bozek, A. Schleper) (PP) – 36:43	2–3
G. Marvin (PP) – 38:16	3–3
G. Marvin (PP) – 42:57	4–3
	4–4	57:22 – M. Agosta (J. Hefford, C. Ouellette) (PP)
	4–5	61:50 – C. Ouellette (M. Agosta)

14 min
Penalties
22 min
44
Shots
39

=== Final standings ===
Rank	Team
1st place, gold medalist(s)	Canada
2nd place, silver medalist(s)	United States
3rd place, bronze medalist(s)	Switzerland
4	Finland
5	Sweden
6	Russia
7	Germany
8	Slovakia

Relegated to the 2013 Division I A

=== Statistics and awards ===
==== Scoring leaders ====
List shows the top 10 skaters sorted by points, then goals.

Player	GP	G	A	Pts	+/−	PIM
(United States) Monique Lamoureux-Kolls	5	7	7	14	+9	6
(United States) Kelli Stack	5	5	8	13	+6	2
(United States) Brianna Decker	5	4	6	10	+13	6
(United States) Amanda Kessel	5	3	7	10	+9	0
(Canada) Hayley Wickenheiser	5	3	7	10	+4	4
(United States) Kendall Coyne	5	4	5	9	+10	0
(United States) Jocelyne Lamoureux	5	4	5	9	+7	8
(Canada) Caroline Ouellette	5	4	5	9	+6	6
(Canada) Jayna Hefford	5	3	6	9	+7	4
(United States) Gigi Marvin	5	3	6	9	+4	2

GP = Games played; G = Goals; A = Assists; Pts = Points; +/− = Plus/minus; PIM = Penalties In Minutes
Source: IIHF.COM

==== Leading goaltenders ====
Only the top five goaltenders, based on save percentage, who have played 40% of their team's minutes are included in this list.

Player	TOI	SA	GA	GAA	Sv%	SO
(Sweden) Sara Grahn	120:01	54	3	1.50	94.44	0
(Switzerland) Florence Schelling	228:23	183	14	3.68	92.35	0
(Slovakia) Zuzana Tomčíková	304:43	177	14	2.76	92.09	0
(Sweden) Kim Martin	179:48	60	5	1.67	91.67	0
(Germany) Viona Harrer	185:00	82	7	2.27	91.46	0

TOI = Time on ice (minutes:seconds); SA = Shots against; GA = Goals against; GAA = Goals against average; Sv% = Save percentage; SO = Shutouts
Source: IIHF.com

==== Tournament Awards ====
- Media All-Stars
  - Goaltender: Florence Schelling (SUI)
  - Defense: Gisele Marvin (USA), Laura Fortino (CAN)
  - Forwards: Monique Lamoureux-Kolls (USA), Kelli Stack (USA), Hayley Wickenheiser (CAN)
- Best players selected by the directorate:
  - Best Goaltender: Florence Schelling (SUI)
  - Best Defenceman: Jenni Hiirikoski (FIN)
  - Best Forward: Kelli Stack (USA)

== Division I ==
=== Division I A ===
The Division I A tournament was played in Ventspils, Latvia, from March 25 to 31, 2012.

Pos	Team	Pld	W	OTW	OTL	L	GF	GA	GD	Pts	Promotion or relegation
1	Czech Republic	5	4	0	0	1	19	8	+11	12	Promoted to the 2013 Top Division
2	Norway	5	3	1	0	1	20	7	+13	11	
3	Japan	5	3	0	0	2	15	10	+5	9	
4	Austria	5	2	0	0	3	16	18	−2	6	
5	Latvia (H)	5	1	1	0	3	5	20	−15	5	
6	Kazakhstan	5	0	0	2	3	7	19	−12	2	Relegated to the 2013 Division I B

Source: IIHF
(H) Host

=== Division I B ===
The Division I B tournament was played in Hull, Great Britain, from April 9 to 15, 2012.

Pos	Team	Pld	W	OTW	OTL	L	GF	GA	GD	Pts	Promotion or relegation
1	Denmark	5	4	0	0	1	31	6	+25	12	Promoted to the 2013 Division I A
2	China	5	4	0	0	1	21	8	+13	12	
3	France	5	4	0	0	1	22	9	+13	12	
4	Great Britain (H)	5	1	0	0	4	10	17	−7	3	
5	Netherlands	5	1	0	0	4	7	34	−27	3	
6	Italy	5	1	0	0	4	5	22	−17	3	Relegated to the 2013 Division II A

Source: IIHF
(H) Host

== Division II ==
=== Division II A ===
The Division II A tournament was played in Maribor, Slovenia, from March 25 to 31, 2012.

Pos	Team	Pld	W	OTW	OTL	L	GF	GA	GD	Pts	Promotion or relegation
1	North Korea	5	5	0	0	0	33	7	+26	15	Promoted to the 2013 Division I B
2	Hungary	5	4	0	0	1	26	6	+20	12	
3	Australia	5	3	0	0	2	11	12	−1	9	
4	New Zealand	5	2	0	0	3	12	23	−11	6	
5	Slovenia (H)	5	0	1	0	4	7	18	−11	2	
6	Croatia	5	0	0	1	4	4	27	−23	1	Relegated to the 2013 Division II B

Source: IIHF
(H) Host

=== Division II B ===
The Division II B tournament was played in Seoul, South Korea, from March 10 to 16, 2012.

Pos	Team	Pld	W	OTW	OTL	L	GF	GA	GD	Pts	Promotion
1	Poland	5	4	1	0	0	38	6	+32	14	Promoted to the 2013 Division II A
2	Spain	5	4	0	0	1	22	5	+17	12	
3	South Korea (H)	5	2	1	1	1	16	8	+8	9	
4	Iceland	5	2	0	1	2	11	15	−4	7	
5	Belgium	5	1	0	0	4	7	12	−5	3	
6	South Africa	5	0	0	0	5	4	52	−48	0	

Source: IIHF
(H) Host
