= Matt Campanale =

American ice hockey player (born 1988)

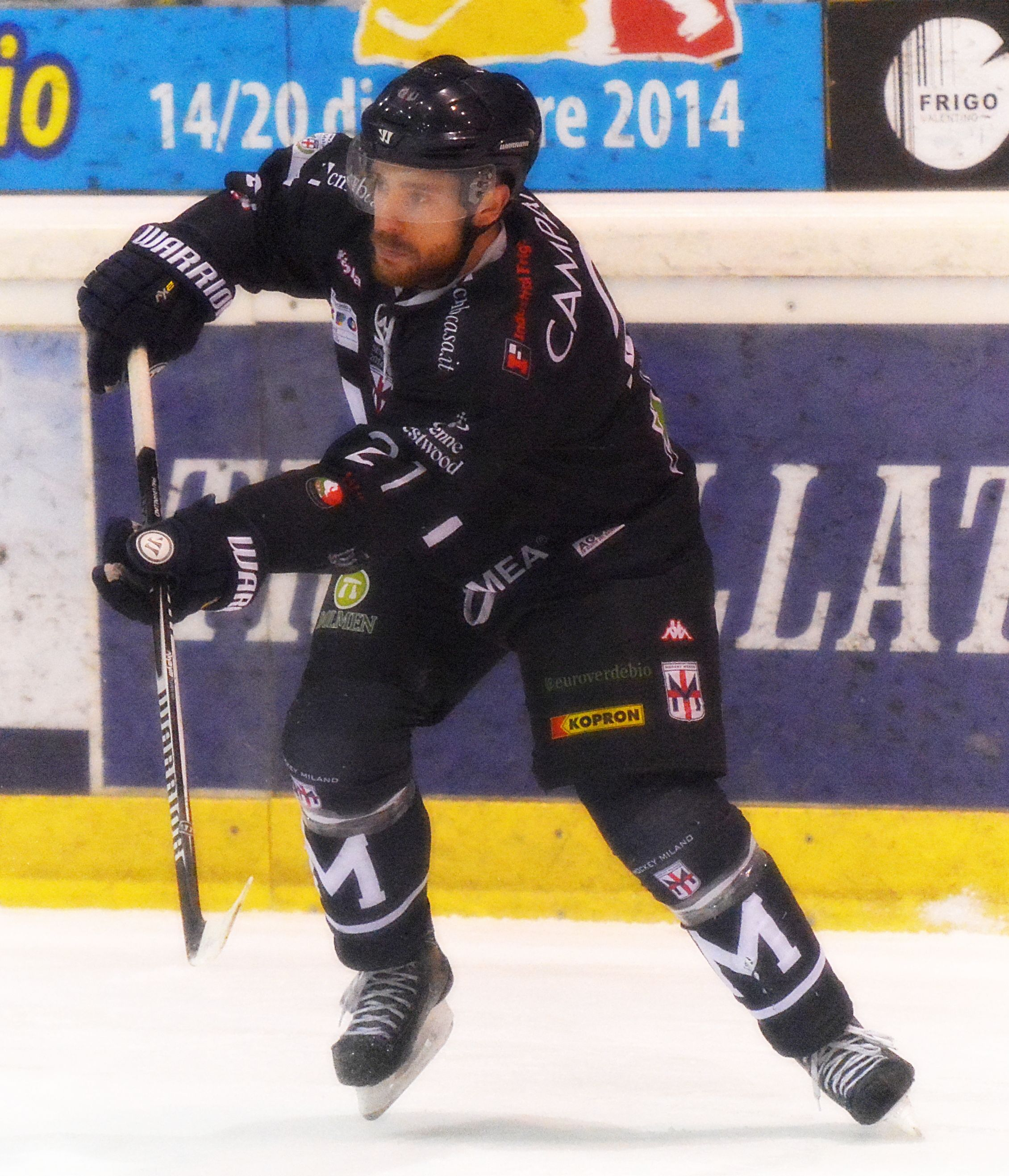
- Born: February 14, 1988 (age 38) Chester Springs, Pennsylvania, U.S.
- Height: 5 ft 11 in (180 cm)
- Weight: 200 lb (91 kg; 14 st 4 lb)
- Position: Defense
- Shot: Left
- Played for: New York Islanders; Milano Rossoblu
- NHL draft: Undrafted
- Playing career: 2011–2015

Matt Campanale (born February 14, 1988) is an American former professional ice hockey defenseman who briefly played in the National Hockey League with the New York Islanders. He is from Chester Springs, Pennsylvania.

== Playing career ==
As a youth, Campanale played in the 2001 and 2002 Quebec International Pee-Wee Hockey Tournaments with the Philadelphia Flyers minor ice hockey team.

Campanale played four seasons of collegiate hockey with the New Hampshire Wildcats men's ice hockey team before signing an amateur try-out contract with the Bridgeport Sound Tigers of the American Hockey League following the 2010–11 NCAA season. After two games with the Sound Tigers, Campanale was surprisingly signed to an amateur try-out contract with Bridgeports' NHL affiliate, the New York Islanders, after their defense was overcome with injury.

He made his NHL debut the same day on April 6, 2011, playing over eight minutes on defense and picking up two penalty minutes in a 3-2 loss to the Boston Bruins.

In his first full professional season in 2011–12, Campanale signed in the ECHL with the Bakersfield Condors. After 8 games, he was traded to fellow ECHL competitor the Elmira Jackals, where he remained for the majority of the season. On July 23, 2012, Campanale re-signed with the Jackals to a one-year extension.

On August 8, 2013, Campanale moved to his fourth ECHL club, signing a one-year deal with reigning champions the Reading Royals.

Despite re-signing with the Royals for a second season on August 20, 2014, Campanalae opted to leave for Europe in signing a one-year deal with Italian Serie A club, Hockey Milano Rossoblu.

== Career statistics ==
			Regular season					Playoffs
Season	Team	League	GP	G	A	Pts	PIM	GP	G	A	Pts	PIM
2005–06	Green Mountain Glades	EJHL	44	4	18	22	27	2	0	0	0	0
2006–07	Green Mountain Glades	EJHL	43	8	25	33	37	—	—	—	—	—
2007–08	U. of New Hampshire	HE	6	0	0	0	0	—	—	—	—	—
2008–09	U. of New Hampshire	HE	22	0	1	1	6	—	—	—	—	—
2009–10	U. of New Hampshire	HE	39	3	9	12	10	—	—	—	—	—
2010–11	U. of New Hampshire	HE	39	0	11	11	16	—	—	—	—	—
2010–11	Bridgeport Sound Tigers	AHL	5	0	0	0	0	—	—	—	—	—
2010–11	New York Islanders	NHL	1	0	0	0	2	—	—	—	—	—
2011–12	Bakersfield Condors	ECHL	8	1	0	1	4	—	—	—	—	—
2011–12	Elmira Jackals	ECHL	58	6	16	22	18	10	1	0	1	2
2011–12	Binghamton Senators	AHL	1	0	0	0	0	—	—	—	—	—
2012–13	Elmira Jackals	ECHL	40	1	10	11	12	—	—	—	—	—
2012–13	Las Vegas Wranglers	ECHL	28	3	5	8	6	7	2	4	6	2
2013–14	Reading Royals	ECHL	71	7	19	26	30	5	0	0	0	0
2014–15	Hockey Milano Rossoblu	ITL	37	8	16	24	30	9	1	5	6	4
NHL totals			1	0	0	0	2	—	—	—	—	—
