= Angela Frautschi =

Swiss ice hockey player

- Born: 5 June 1987 (age 38); Interlaken, Bern, Switzerland
- Height: 5 ft 7 in (170 cm)
- Weight: 161 lb (73 kg; 11 st 7 lb)
- Position: Defence
- Played for: DHC Langenthal; ZSC Lions
- National team: Switzerland
- Playing career: 2006–2016

Angela Frautschi
Medal record

Women's ice hockey

Representing Switzerland

Olympic Games
Bronze medal – third place	2014 Sochi	Team

IIHF World Women's Championships
Bronze medal – third place	2012 United States	Tournament

Angela Frautschi (born 5 June 1987) is a Swiss former ice hockey player. She was a member of the Switzerland women's national ice hockey team. She played in the 2006, 2010 and 2014 Winter Olympics. She also competed for ZSC Lions Zurich in the Leistungsklasse A (the top women's ice hockey league in Switzerland).

In 2014 Frautschi accompanied the Swiss women's Ice Hockey Team to Sochi for the Winter Olympics.

== Playing career ==
=== Switzerland ===
In a game versus Russia at the 2012 IIHF Women's World Championship, Frautschi logged a pair of assists in a 5–2 victory, as Switzerland advanced to the semifinals.

== Career statistics ==
=== Club ===
			Regular season					Playoffs
Season	Team	League	GP	G	A	Pts	PIM	GP	G	A	Pts	PIM
2006-07	EV Bomo Thun	SWHL A	-	-	-	-	-	-	-	-	-	-
2007-08	DHC Langenthal	SWHL A	17	2	3	5	50	5	0	3	3	10
2007-08	DHC Langenthal II	SWHL B	1	0	0	0	0	-	-	-	-	-
2009-10	ZSC Lions Frauen	SWHL A	17	4	17	21	10	4	0	1	1	0
2010-11	ZSC Lions Frauen	SWHL A	8	4	17	21	6	3	3	0	3	2
2011-12	ZSC Lions Frauen	SWHL A	18	3	9	12	16	6	1	4	5	2
2013-14	ZSC Lions Frauen	SWHL A	18	1	15	16	8	2	1	0	1	4
2014-15	ZSC Lions Frauen	SWHL A	5	0	2	2	0	8	0	1	1	2
2015-16	ZSC Lions Frauen	SWHL A	13	2	5	7	10	7	1	2	3	4
2015-16	ZSC Lions Frauen	Swiss Women Cup	2	1	0	1	0	-	-	-	-	-
SWHL A totals			96	16	68	84	100	35	6	17	17	24

=== International ===
Year	Team	Event	GP	G	A	Pts	PIM
2006	Switzerland	OG	5	0	0	0	2
2008	Switzerland	WC	5	0	0	0	6
2009	Switzerland	WC	4	0	1	1	6
2010	Switzerland	OG	5	0	0	0	8
2011	Switzerland	WC	5	0	0	0	2
2012	Switzerland	WC	5	0	2	2	8
2014	Switzerland	OG	6	0	0	0	0
WC totals			19	0	3	3	22
OG totals			16	0	0	0	10

== Honours and achievements ==
=== SWHL-A ===
- 2007-2008 : DHC Langenthal
- 2010-2011 : Champion with ZSC Lions Frauen
- 2011-2012 : Champion with ZSC Lions Frauen
- 2015-2016 : Champion with ZSC Lions Frauen

=== Swiss Women Cup ===
- 2015-2016 : Cup Winner with ZSC Lions Frauen

=== WC ===
- 2009 : Top3 Player on Team
- 2012 : Bronze Medal

=== OG ===
- 2014 : Bronze Medal

=== Other ===
- 2014 : Swiss Hockey Hall of Fame
