= Briarcrest =

Briarcrest may refer to:

- Briarcrest Christian School, in Eads, Tennessee, United States
- Briarcrest, New Jersey, US, a neighborhood in Ewing Township

== See also ==
- Briercrest (disambiguation)
