= Zemgus Girgensons =

Latvian ice hockey player (born 1994)

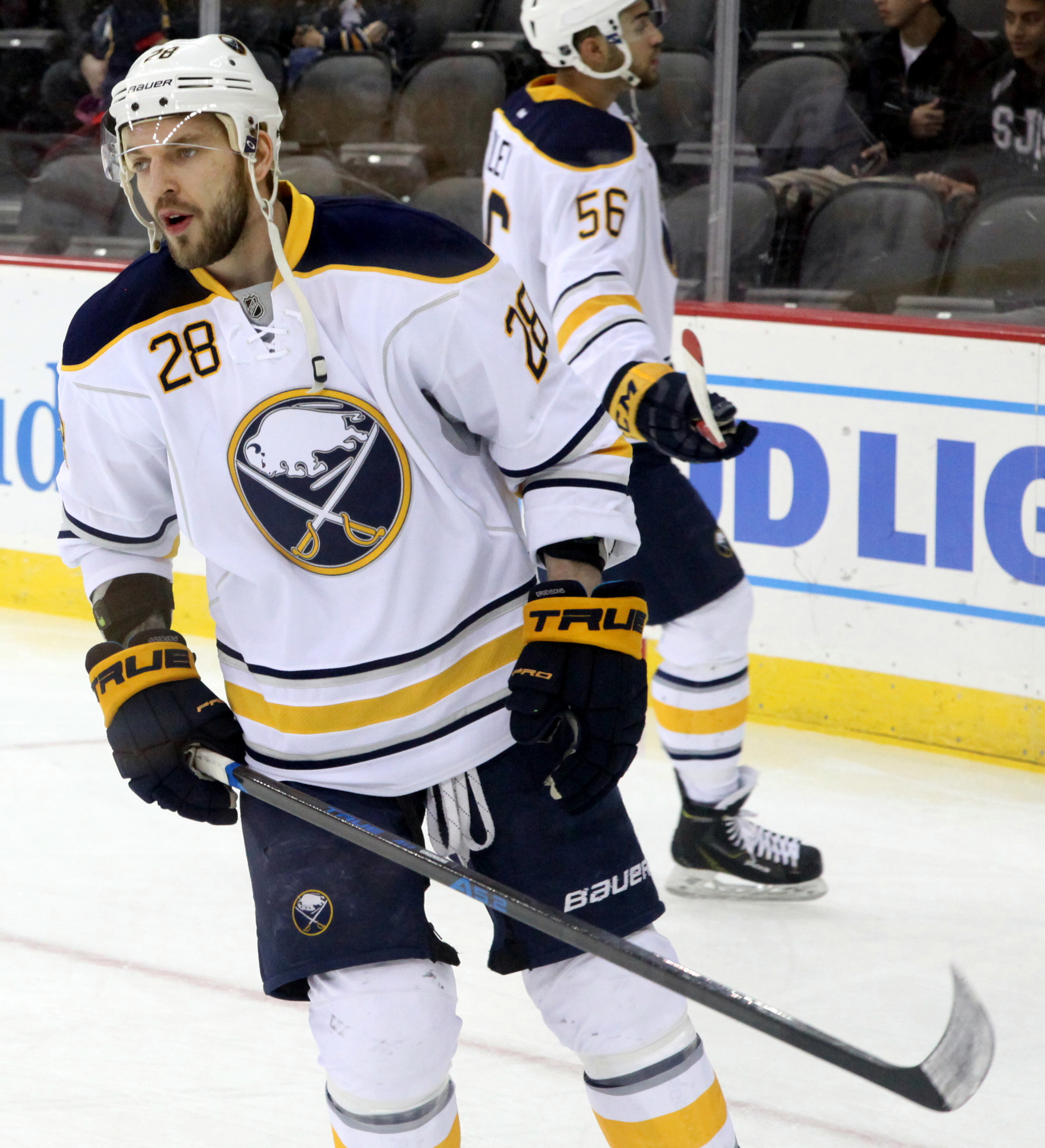
- Girgensons with the Buffalo Sabres in 2016
- Born: 5 January 1994 (age 32) Riga, Latvia
- Height: 6 ft 1 in (185 cm)
- Weight: 197 lb (89 kg; 14 st 1 lb)
- Position: Forward
- Shoots: Left
- NHL team Former teams: Tampa Bay Lightning; Buffalo Sabres
- National team: Latvia
- NHL draft: 14th overall, 2012; Buffalo Sabres
- Playing career: 2012–present

Zemgus Girgensons (born 5 January 1994) is a Latvian professional ice hockey player who is a forward for the Tampa Bay Lightning of the National Hockey League (NHL). He was selected in the first round, 14th overall, in the 2012 NHL entry draft by the Buffalo Sabres. With this selection, Girgensons became at that time the highest-drafted Latvian in NHL history, 16 spots higher than previous highest selection, Sandis Ozoliņš, in 1991. Girgensons was voted to the NHL All-Star Game in 2015.

== Playing career ==
Girgensons began playing hockey in EVHS hockey school and was coached by former Dinamo Riga player Edmunds Vasiļjevs. He played in Latvian minor and youth leagues.

=== Junior ===
In 2009, Girgensons moved to North America and played in the Eastern Junior Hockey League (EJHL) for the Green Mountain Glades. The next season, he moved to the United States Hockey League (USHL) and played for the Dubuque Fighting Saints. In 2011, he became a USHL champion with the Fighting Saints, and he also participated in the USHL All-Star Game. In the 2011–12 season, his last as a junior, Girgensons was named as the captain of the Fighting Saints.

=== Professional ===
==== Buffalo Sabres ====
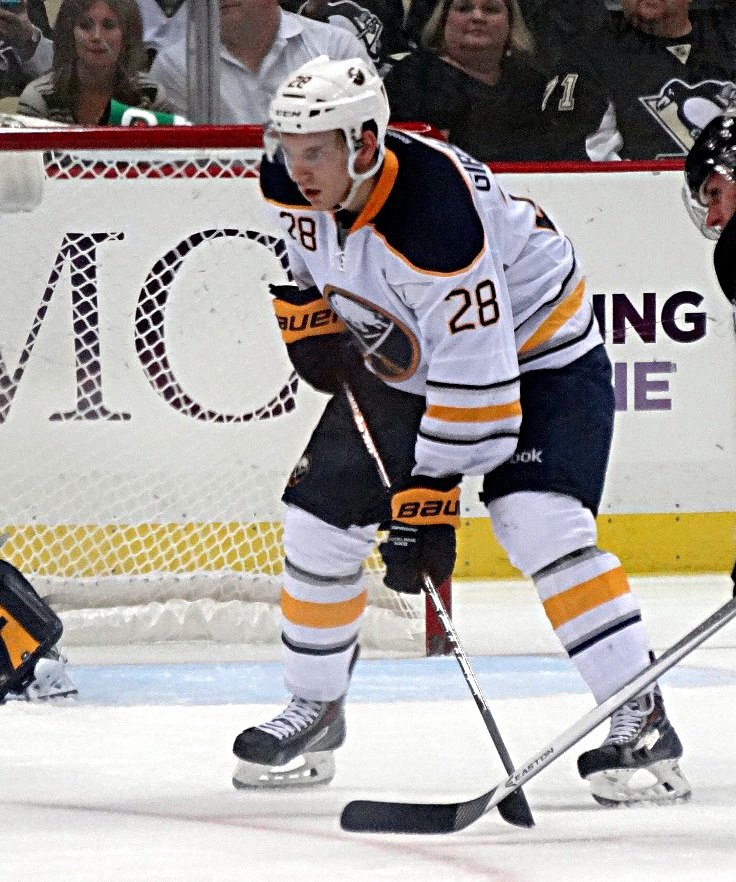
With the Sabres in 2013

Girgensons entered his draft eligibility year as a projected first-round draft pick. He was selected by the Buffalo Sabres in the first round, 14th overall. The Sabres had already used their own first-round pick, selecting Mikhail Grigorenko 12th overall, but traded a first-round (21st overall) pick (from Nashville), which Calgary used to select Mark Jankowski, and a second-round (42nd overall) pick, to move up seven spots to draft Girgensons. Before attending the Sabres' prospects' summer camp, Girgensons had committed to going to the University of Vermont Catamounts of the National Collegiate Athletic Association (NCAA); however, he signed a professional contract with the Sabres on 13 July 2012, which forfeited his NCAA eligibility.

Girgensons began the 2012–13 season in the American Hockey League (AHL) with the Rochester Americans. He had a slow start to the season and, at the beginning of 2013, he suffered an injury from a late hit by Richard Pánik of the Syracuse Crunch. However, he finished the season strongly, scoring three goals in the Americans' first-round defeat in the Calder Cup playoffs.

After scoring three goals and adding one assist in five preseason games, Girgensons began the 2013–14 season in the NHL with the Sabres. He scored his first career NHL goal in the Sabres' season opener against Jimmy Howard of the Detroit Red Wings on 2 October 2013.

Girgensons was the runaway leader in fan voting for the 2015 All-Star Game, buoyed in large part by votes from his native Latvia.

On 1 September 2016, Girgensons, as a restricted free agent re-signed with the Sabres, agreeing to a one-year, $1.15 million contract extension. The following season, on 17 August 2017, Girgensons re-signed with the Sabres again, agreeing to a two-year contract worth $3.2 million

On 5 July 2019, Girgensons signed a one-year, $1.6 million contract extension with the Sabres. He posted 12 goals during the 2019–20 season, the second-highest goal total of his career and enjoyed success playing alongside Johan Larsson and Kyle Okposo, a line dubbed "The Roarin' 20's" by fans due to the trio's jersey numbers. On 8 October 2020, Girgensons opted to forgo free agency and signed a three-year, $6.6 million contract extension with the Sabres.

On 4 January 2021, a day before his 27th birthday, Girgensons sustained a lower-body injury during a training camp scrimmage ahead of the 2020–21 season and had to be helped off the ice. It was revealed on 6 January, that he suffered a hamstring injury and had undergone successful surgery to correct it. It effectively ruled him out for the season.

Prior to the start of the 2021–22 season, the Sabres named Girgensons one of two alternate captains, along with Kyle Okposo, as Jack Eichel was stripped of the captaincy prior to the season due to injury.

On 20 June 2023, he signed a one-year contract with the Sabres.

==== Tampa Bay Lightning ====
On 1 July 2024, Girgensons became a free agent for the first time in his career following his first 10 NHL seasons with the Sabres. He was promptly signed to add forward centre depth on a three-year, $2.55 million contract with the Tampa Bay Lightning.

== International play ==
Girgensons participated at the 2012 World Junior Ice Hockey Championships as a member of the Latvian junior team and at the 2010 IIHF World U18 Championships. He made his senior national team debut in 2013 World Championships against the United States and scored his first international goal against Slovakia. He also was suspended for one game for spearing Branislav Mezei in the first period of the match in retaliation for an earlier hit.

On 7 January 2014, it was announced that Latvia head coach Ted Nolan had included Girgensons on his national team roster for the 2014 Winter Olympics. Girgensons scored his first Olympic goal in Latvia's third tournament game, coming versus Sweden off of a power play goal against Henrik Lundqvist.

Girgensons has played for Latvia in the 2013 IIHF World Championship, 2014 IIHF World Championship, 2016 IIHF World Championship and 2017 IIHF World Championship.

== Personal life ==
Girgensons comes from an ice hockey family. His father, Aldis Girgensons, played as defenceman for RTU Hanza Riga, and is the general manager of East Hokkaido Cranes of the Asia League Ice Hockey (ALIH) and led the team to victory in the All-Japan Championship in December 2020.

Girgensons and his wife have three children.

== Career statistics ==
=== Regular season and playoffs ===
			Regular season					Playoffs
Season	Team	League	GP	G	A	Pts	PIM	GP	G	A	Pts	PIM
2009–10	Green Mountain Glades	EmJHL	19	17	12	29	6	—	—	—	—	—
2009–10	Green Mountain Glades	EJHL	42	28	29	57	19	2	0	2	0	2
2010–11	Dubuque Fighting Saints	USHL	51	21	28	49	46	11	3	5	8	8
2011–12	Dubuque Fighting Saints	USHL	49	24	31	55	69	2	2	2	4	0
2012–13	Rochester Americans	AHL	61	6	11	17	28	3	3	0	3	0
2013–14	Buffalo Sabres	NHL	70	8	14	22	14	—	—	—	—	—
2014–15	Buffalo Sabres	NHL	61	15	15	30	25	—	—	—	—	—
2015–16	Buffalo Sabres	NHL	71	7	11	18	20	—	—	—	—	—
2016–17	Buffalo Sabres	NHL	75	7	9	16	18	—	—	—	—	—
2017–18	Buffalo Sabres	NHL	71	7	8	15	26	—	—	—	—	—
2018–19	Buffalo Sabres	NHL	72	5	13	18	17	—	—	—	—	—
2019–20	Buffalo Sabres	NHL	69	12	7	19	10	—	—	—	—	—
2021–22	Buffalo Sabres	NHL	56	10	8	18	27	—	—	—	—	—
2022–23	Buffalo Sabres	NHL	80	10	8	18	14	—	—	—	—	—
2023–24	Buffalo Sabres	NHL	63	8	6	14	21	—	—	—	—	—
2024–25	Tampa Bay Lightning	NHL	82	2	4	6	47	5	0	0	0	0
2025–26	Tampa Bay Lightning	NHL	74	9	11	20	31	7	0	0	0	4
NHL totals			844	100	114	214	270	12	0	0	0	4

=== International ===
Year	Team	Event	Result	GP	G	A	Pts	PIM
2010	Latvia	WJC18	9th	6	1	1	2	2
2011	Latvia	WJC D1	11th	5	4	3	7	8
2012	Latvia	WJC	9th	6	2	0	2	6
2013	Latvia	WC	11th	5	1	0	1	0
2014	Latvia	OG	8th	5	1	1	2	2
2014	Latvia	WC	11th	6	2	0	2	29
2016	Latvia	WC	13th	7	1	0	1	4
2016	Latvia	OGQ	DNQ	3	0	1	1	2
2017	Latvia	WC	10th	7	1	1	2	0
2021	Latvia	OGQ	Q	3	0	1	1	0
2024	Latvia	OGQ	Q	1	0	0	0	0
2026	Latvia	OG	10th	4	0	4	4	0
Junior totals				17	7	4	11	16
Senior totals				41	6	8	14	37

== Awards and honours ==
Award	Year	Ref
USHL
All-Star Game	2011	
Clark Cup champion	2011	
First All-Star Team	2012	
NHL
All-Star Game	2015	
Latvia
Rising Star of the Year Award	2013	

Awards and achievements
Preceded by Laura Ikauniece	Latvian Rising Sportspersonality of the Year; 2013	Succeeded by Jeļena Ostapenko
Sporting positions
Preceded by Mikhail Grigorenko	Buffalo Sabres first-round draft pick 2012	Succeeded by Rasmus Ristolainen
