= Marina Sergina =

Russian ice hockey forward (born 1986)

- Born: March 2, 1986 (age 39); Polyarnye Zori, Russian SSR, Soviet Union
- Height: 5 ft 6 in (168 cm)
- Weight: 150 lb (68 kg; 10 st 10 lb)
- Position: Forward
- Shoots: Left
- National team: Russia
- Playing career: 2007–present

Marina Vladimirovna Sergina (born 2 March 1986 in Polyarnye Zori, Russian SSR, Soviet Union) is a Russian ice hockey forward.

== International career ==
Sergina was selected for the Russia national women's ice hockey team in the 2010 Winter Olympics. She played in all five games, recording one goal and two assists to tie for the team lead in points.

Sergina has also appeared for Russia at four IIHF Women's World Championships. Her first appearance came in 2008.

== Career statistics ==
=== International career ===
| Year | Team | Event | GP | G | A | Pts | PIM |
|---|---|---|---|---|---|---|---|
| 2008 | Russia | WW | 4 | 0 | 1 | 1 | 6 |
| 2009 | Russia | WW | 4 | 0 | 1 | 1 | 6 |
| 2010 | Russia | Oly | 5 | 1 | 2 | 3 | 8 |
| 2011 | Russia | WW | 6 | 1 | 5 | 6 | 12 |
| 2012 | Russia | WW | 5 | 1 | 1 | 2 | 8 |
