= Iveta Frühauf =

Slovak ice hockey player and coach (born 1988)

- Born: 14 May 1988 (age 38) Bratislava, Czechoslovakia
- Height: 174 cm (5 ft 9 in)
- Weight: 64 kg (141 lb; 10 st 1 lb)
- Position: Forward
- Shot: Left
- Played for: HC Roudnice nad Labem; HC Pardubice; HC Plzen; HC Slovan Bratislava; ZHK Poprad; Linköping HC
- National team: Slovakia
- Playing career: 2002–2017

Iveta Frühauf née Karafiátová (born 14 May 1988) is a Slovak retired ice hockey forward. She played with the Slovak national team at nine IIHF World Women's Championships across the Top Division, Division 1, and Division 2, and represented Slovakia in the women's ice hockey tournament at the 2010 Vancouver Winter Games.

== Playing career ==
Along with fellow Slovak national team members Zuzana Tomčíková and Martina Veličková, Frühauf played on boys' teams until Slovak league rules prevented her from continuing after turning 16. All three continued their careers by playing hockey in Saskatchewan for head coach Barrett Kropf at Caronport High School in 2004. Frühauf, Tomčíková, and Veličková played for the Caronport Lady Cougars, but Frühauf and Tomčíková also played on the boys' team.

== International play ==
She was part of the Slovak roster that defeated Bulgaria by an 82–0 score in September 2008 in the Olympic Pre-Qualification tournament in Latvia. In the win, she accumulated 11 points.

In 2009, she competed in the International Ice Hockey Federation (IIHF) World Women’s Championship Division I, in Graz, Austria. She was part of the Slovak team that qualified for the top division of the 2011 World Women's Championships.

=== Vancouver Winter Games ===
She played for the Slovakia women's team in the 2010 Olympics, the country's first appearance in women's ice hockey outside Europe. Of note, she was the captain of the Slovak national team at the 2010 Vancouver Winter Games. Her first Olympic women's ice hockey game was on 13 February 2010 against Canada. Slovakia lost the game by an 18-0 mark and she was penalized for roughing in the first period. She did not register any points in the Olympic tournament as Slovakia finished in eighth place.

== Career stats ==
=== Winter Olympics ===
Year	GP	Goals	Assists	Points	PIM	+/-
2010 Vancouver Olympics	5	0	0	0	4	

== Awards and honors ==
- Best Defender, 2009 IIHF World Women’s Championship Division I
- Best players of each team selection (as voted by coaches), 2011 IIHF Women's World Championship

== Personal ==
Frühauf attended university in Linköping, Sweden, while playing with Linköping HC Dam.
