= Martina Veličková =

Slovak ice hockey player

Martina Rašková Veličková
- Born: 17 February 1989 (age 37) Prešov, Czechoslovakia
- Height: 166 cm (5 ft 5 in)
- Weight: 58 kg (128 lb; 9 st 2 lb)
- Position: Forward
- Shot: Left
- Played for: ŽHK Šarišanka Prešov; SC Reinach Damen; HC Spišská Nová Ves; HK Pantera Minsk; HC Slovan Bratislava; MHK Martin; OSC Eisladies Berlin; HC Slavia Praha
- National team: Slovakia
- Playing career: 2002–2018

Martina Rašková Veličková (born 17 February 1989), is a Slovak women's ice hockey forward, most recently of ŽHK Šarišanka Prešov in the 2017–18 season of the Slovak Women's Extraliiga. She served as captain of the Slovak national team in the women's ice hockey tournament at the 2010 Olympic Winter Games in Vancouver.

== Playing career ==
Veličková, along with fellow Slovak national team members Zuzana Tomčíková, and Iveta Karafiátová played on boys' teams until Slovak league rules prevented them from continuing with those teams once they turned 16. All three continued their careers by playing hockey in Saskatchewan for head coach Barrett Kropf at Caronport High School in 2004. Karafiátová, Tomčíková, and Veličková played for the Caronport Lady Cougars but Karafiátová and Tomčíková also played on the boys team.

She was part of the Slovak roster that defeated Bulgaria by an 82–0 score in September 2008 in the Olympic Pre-Qualification tournament in Latvia. In the win, she accumulated 17 points.

In 2009, she competed in the 2009 IIHF World Women's Championship Division I, which was played in Graz, Austria. She was part of the Slovak team that qualified for the top division of the 2011 World Women's Championships.

At the 2011 IIHF Women's World Championships, Slovakia played Kazakhstan in a best of three relegation series. In the second game, Veličková beat Daria Obydennova for the only goal in the shootout as Slovakia won the relegation series.

=== Vancouver Winter Games ===
She played for Slovakia in the 2010 Olympics. It was the first time that Slovakia competed in women's ice hockey outside of Europe. Of note, she was the captain of the Slovak national team at the 2010 Vancouver Winter Games. Her first Olympic women's ice hockey game came on February 13, 2010 against Canada. Slovakia lost the game by an 18-0 mark. Her first Olympic points came on February 20, 2010. Veličková assisted on both goals in a 4-2 loss to Russia. She would finish with three assists in the Olympic tournament as Slovakia finished in eighth place.

== Career stats ==
=== Winter Olympics ===
Year	GP	Goals	Assists	Points	PIM	+/-
2010 Vancouver Olympics	5	0	3	3	2	
