= Anne Helin =

Finnish ice hockey player

- Born: 28 January 1987 (age 39) Helsinki, Finland
- Height: 170 cm (5 ft 7 in)
- Weight: 68 kg (150 lb; 10 st 10 lb)
- Position: Forward
- Shot: Left
- Played for: Karhu-Kissat; IHK Helsinki; Oulun Kärpät
- Coached for: Kärpät Akatemia
- National team: Finland
- Playing career: 2002–2013
- Coaching career: 2016–2019
Medal record
Olympic Games
Bronze medal – third place	2010 Vancouver	Ice hockey
World Championship
Bronze medal – third place	2008 China
Bronze medal – third place	2009 Finland
Bronze medal – third place	2011 Switzerland
Universiade
Silver medal – second place	2011 Erzurum	Ice hockey

Anne Helin (born 28 January 1987) is a Finnish retired ice hockey player and former member of the Finnish national ice hockey team. Representing Finland, she won a bronze medal in the women's ice hockey tournament at the 2010 Winter Olympics in Vancouver, three IIHF Women's World Championship bronze medals at the tournaments in 2008, 2009, and 2011, and a silver medal in the women's ice hockey tournament at the 2011 Winter Universiade in Erzurum, Turkey.

== Playing career ==
Helin debuted in the Naisten SM-sarja, the Finnish Championship league for women's ice hockey, at age 12 in the 1999–2000 season. She played with the women's representative team of Karhu-Kissat (K-Kissat) during 1999 to 2002 and was the team's regular season leading scorer in 2000–01 and 2001–02. K-Kissat faced relegation in every season that Helin was with the team and, though Helin averaged over two points per game in the 2001 and 2002 qualification series, they were officially relegated in 2002.

To continue playing in the top-tier Naisten SM-sarja, Helin transferred to Itä-Helsingin Kiekko (IHK), another Helsinki-based club, for the 2002–03 season.

== Career statistics ==
=== Regular season and playoffs ===
			Regular season					Playoffs
Season	Team	League	GP	G	A	Pts	PIM	GP	G	A	Pts	PIM
1999–2000	K-Kissat	Naisten SM-sarja	14	2	0	2	6	14	10	7	17	4
2000–01	K-Kissat	Naisten SM-sarja	14	7	5	12	8	14	17	10	27	6
2001–02	K-Kissat	Naisten SM-sarja	12	4	5	9	10	10	13	9	22	12
2002–03	IHK	Naisten SM-sarja	22	24	8	32	27	3	1	0	1	0
2003–04	IHK	Naisten SM-sarja	24	24	15	39	8	7	5	3	8	4
2004–05	IHK	Naisten SM-sarja	19	14	12	26	4	6	7	1	8	4
2005–06	IHK	Naisten SM-sarja	22	22	11	33	2	7	6	1	7	8
2006–07	IHK	Naisten SM-sarja	19	20	16	36	18	5	3	5	8	4
2007–08	IHK	Naisten SM-sarja	20	34	21	55	38	10	27	14	41	10
2008–09	Kärpät	Naisten SM-sarja	24	32	30	62	12	5	1	1	2	8
2009–10	Kärpät	Naisten SM-sarja	14	28	19	47	18	7	5	2	7	6
2010–11	Kärpät	Naisten SM-sarja	20	35	16	51	55	6	8	2	10	6
2011–12	Kärpät	Naisten SM-sarja	27	43	33	76	24	4	3	3	6	6
2012–13	Kärpät	Naisten SM-sarja	25	38	31	69	30	6	2	5	7	8
Naisten SM-sarja totals			276	327	222	549	260	56	41	23	64	54

Note: Postseason results in italics are from the qualification series (Finnish: Karsintasarja) rather than the playoffs and are not calculated with playoff totals.

=== International ===
Year	Team	Event	Result	GP	G	A	Pts	PIM
2008	Finland	WW	3rd place, bronze medalist(s)	5	3	1	4	4
2009	Finland	WW	3rd place, bronze medalist(s)	5	1	2	3	4
2010	Finland	OG	3rd place, bronze medalist(s)	5	0	0	0	0
2011	Finland	Uni	2nd place, silver medalist(s)	6	5	9	14	16
2011	Finland	WW	3rd place, bronze medalist(s)	6	0	2	2	4
2012	Finland	WW	4th	6	1	1	2	10
Senior totals				33	10	15	25	38

== See also ==
- List of Olympic women's ice hockey players for Finland

Awards
Preceded by (Canada) Melissa Jaques	Best Forward of IIHF European Women's Champions Cup; 2012–13	Succeeded by (United States) Kelley Steadman
