= Josephine Pucci =

American ice hockey player (born 1990)

- Born: December 27, 1990 (age 35) Queens, New York, U.S.
- Height: 5 ft 8 in (173 cm)
- Weight: 149 lb (68 kg; 10 st 9 lb)
- Position: Defense
- Shot: Right
- ECAC team: Harvard
- National team: United States
- Playing career: 2008–2014
Medal record
Representing United States
Women's ice hockey
Olympic Games
Silver medal – second place	2014 Sochi	Tournament
IIHF World Women's Championships
Gold medal – first place	2011 Switzerland	Tournament
Silver medal – second place	2012 United States	Tournament
Women's 4 Nations Cup
Gold medal – first place	2011 Sweden	Tournament

Josephine Pucci (born December 27, 1990) is an American former women's ice hockey player for the Harvard Crimson women's ice hockey program who made her debut for the United States women's national ice hockey team at the 2011 IIHF Women's World Championship.

== Playing career ==
=== NCAA ===
==== 2009–2010 season ====
Her freshman year with Harvard was during the 2009–10 season. Pucci participated in 31 games and accumulated 13 points on four goals and nine assists. Her contributions helped Harvard rank fifth in the nation in scoring defense. On November 21, 2009, she registered a season high three assists in one game versus Brown. Four days later, she scored a power play goal and assisted on the game-winning goal against Dartmouth.

==== 2010–2011 season ====
In her sophomore year, Pucci led all Harvard defenders with 25 points on 12 goals and 13 assists, and led the team with a +24 rating.

=== USA hockey ===
From April 4 to 12, 2011, she was one of 30 players that took part in a selection / training camp. She was named to the final roster that participated at the 2011 IIHF Women's World Championship. Pucci was named to the U.S. roster that traveled to the Four Nations Cup from Nov. 9–13, 2011 in Sweden.

== Player profile ==
Pucci was a defenseman and a captain for the Crimson's 2012–2013 season.

== Awards and honors ==
- ECAC Hockey Rookie of the Week (Week of November 30, 2009)
- 2010–11 New England Women's Division I All-Stars
- 2010–11 All-Ivy League first team
- 2010–11 All-ECAC Hockey second-team honors
- 2012 Patty Kazmaier Memorial Award Nominee
