= Viona Harrer =

German ice hockey player

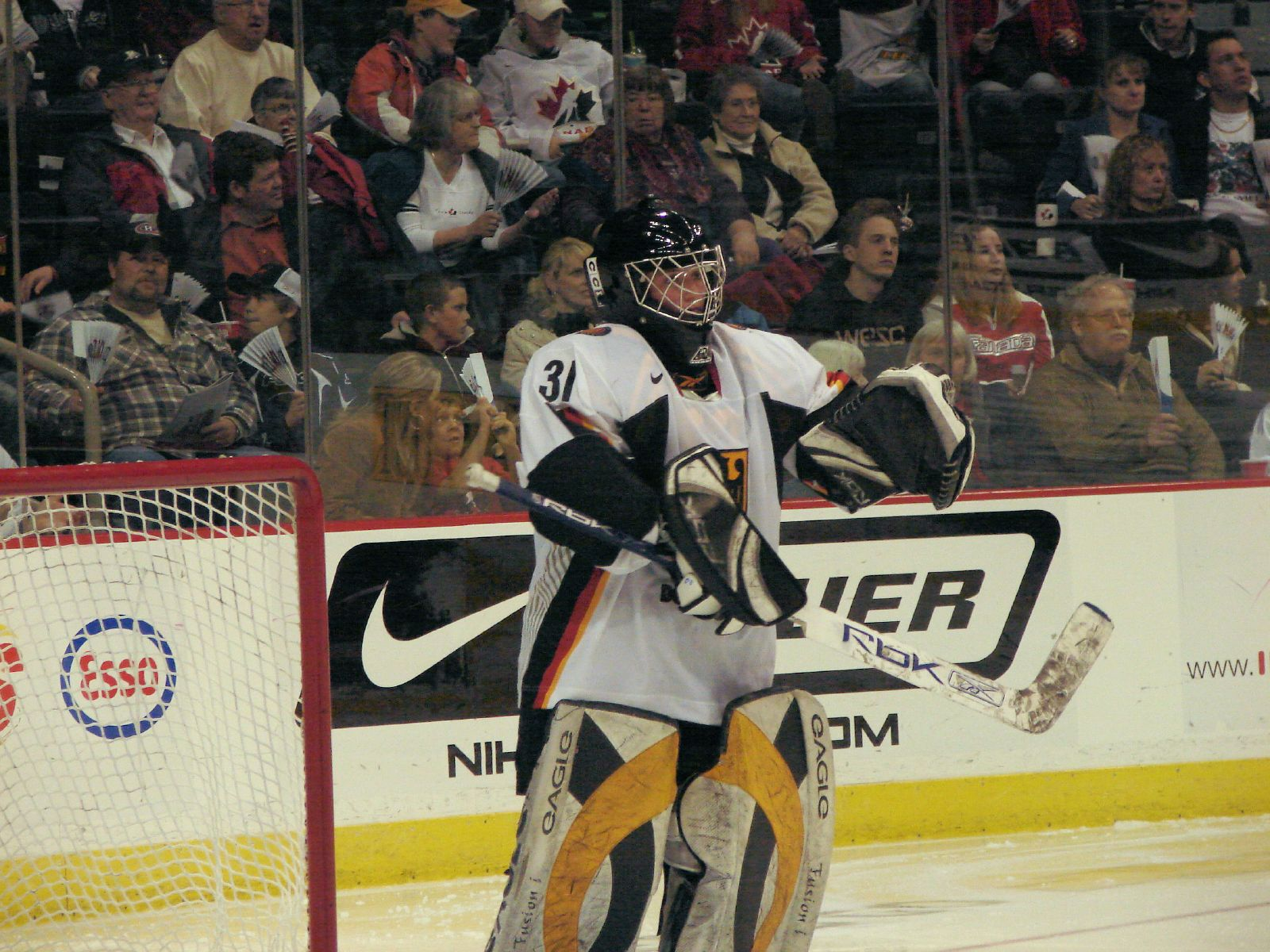
- Born: 5 November 1986 (age 39) Kolbermoor, West Germany
- Height: 5 ft 6 in (168 cm)
- Weight: 143 lb (65 kg; 10 st 3 lb)
- Position: Goaltender / Defense
- Shoots: Left
- Catches: Left
- DFEL team: ESC Planegg
- National team: Germany
- Playing career: 2005–present

Viona Harrer (born 5 November 1986) is a German female ice hockey goaltender, who played for the otherwise all-male Team Tölzer Löwen and for the Germany women's national ice hockey team. At a 2009 Women's Four Nations Tournament held in Slovakia, Harrer was named the tournament's top goaltender.

== Career ==
Harrer began her career as ice hockey goaltender at the age of 5 at SB Rosenheim. Later she trained with TEV Miesbach and was the regular goaltender with the ESC Planegg in the Ladies-Bundesliga, before she ahead of the season 2003/04 moved to her grandparents in Reichersbeuern, to play in the DNL (Rookie)-Team of Tölzer Löwen (Lions of Bad Tölz). In the season 2007/08, she played in the colors of the Tölzer Profimannschaft as the first woman ever to play in the German professional Eishockeyoberliga. As the Tölzer Löwen moved on to play in the 2. Eishockey-Bundesliga she transferred to TSV Erding, where her elder brother Daniel had played for several years. In the season 2010/11, she played for TSV Erding in the Deutsche Fraueneishockey-Liga (women's league elite in Germany). In 2012, she was playing again for Tölzer Löwen. She stands 5 feet 5 inches (165 cm) and weighs 116 pounds (53 kg).

Viona Harrer became a Corporal in the German Bundeswehr Sportfördergruppe der Bundeswehr.

=== Internationally ===
Already at the age of 16 years old, she belonged to the extended squad if the Deutsche Nationalmannschaft (German Ladies Ice Hockey National Team) and traveled to the 2003 World Championship in Beijing, which was canceled due to the SARS epidemic. One year later in Halifax, Nova Scotia, Canada, she had her first assignment in a world championship. Due to some injuries, she had to skip the 2006 Winter Olympics, and could not participate internationally until 2007.

At the 2008 World Championship, she and her German team finished 9th and were relegated to Division I.

== Career statistics ==
Year	Team	Event	Result	GP	W	L	T/OT	MIN	GA	SO	GAA	SV%
2014	Germany	OG	6th	3	2	1	0	180:00	6	1	2.00	0.938

== See also ==
- Germany women's national ice hockey team
