= Anne Schleper =

American ice hockey player

- Born: January 30, 1990 (age 36) St. Cloud, Minnesota, U.S.
- Height: 5 ft 10 in (178 cm)
- Weight: 170 lb (77 kg; 12 st 2 lb)
- Position: Defence
- Shoots: Left
- NWHL team: Buffalo Beauts
- National team: United States
- Playing career: 2008–present
Medal record
Women's ice hockey
Representing United States
Olympic Games
Silver medal – second place	2014 Sochi	Team
IIHF World Women's Championships
Gold medal – first place	2011 Switzerland	Team
Gold medal – first place	2013 Canada	Team
Gold medal – first place	2015 Sweden	Team
Silver medal – second place	2012 United States	Team

Anne Kathryn Schleper (born January 30, 1990) is an American ice hockey player who plays for the Buffalo Beauts in the National Women's Hockey League (NWHL). She played collegiate hockey with the Minnesota Golden Gophers women's ice hockey team and earned her first appearance with the United States women's national ice hockey team at the 2011 IIHF Women's World Championship. Schleper is a native of St. Cloud, Minnesota.

== Playing career ==
Between April 4 and 12, 2011, Schleper was one of 30 elite athletes invited to participate in a highly competitive selection and training camp. As a result of her efforts, she was named to the final roster that would represent the United States at the 2011 IIHF Women's World Championship.

== Awards and honors ==
- WCHA co-Offensive Players of the Week (Week of October 27, 2010)
- 2010–11 WCHA First Team
- 2010–11 WCHA All-Academic Team
- 2011 Big Ten Outstanding Sportsmanship Award
- 2012 Big Ten Medal of Honor

== Personal life ==
Schleper is a practicing Christian. She has discussed the role of her faith in her life, explaining, "Any time you get in the athletic environment, it’s challenging as a Christian. It’s easy to have an ‘it’s about me’ attitude. That's why it's important to be around other Christians who can lift you up and pray for you. It's good to stay connected, and that's where I’ve seen those Bible studies at camps be so huge. God is opening the eyes of teammates who I would never have thought would come. He's building it into something bigger and better."

On January 27, 2017, Schleper married Denard Span, a professional baseball player who played as an outfielder in Major League Baseball (MLB). Later that year, in October 2017, the couple celebrated the birth of their first child, a son named DJ.
