= Darcia Leimgruber =

Swiss ice hockey player

- Born: 19 May 1989 (age 35); Basel, Switzerland
- Height: 5 ft 4 in (163 cm)
- Weight: 137 lb (62 kg; 9 st 11 lb)
- Position: Forward
- Shoots: Left
- SWHL A team Former teams: SC Reinach Damen; Maine Black Bears
- National team: Switzerland
- Playing career: 2007–present

Darcia Leimgruber
Medal record

Women's ice hockey

Representing Switzerland

IIHF World Women's Championships
Bronze medal – third place	2012 United States	Tournament

Darcia Leimgruber (born 19 May 1989) is a Swiss female ice hockey player. She is a member of the Switzerland women's national ice hockey team. She played in the 2010 Winter Olympics. She also played also for ZSC Lions Zurich in the Leistungsklasse A, the top women's ice hockey league in Switzerland.

== Playing career ==
=== Switzerland ===
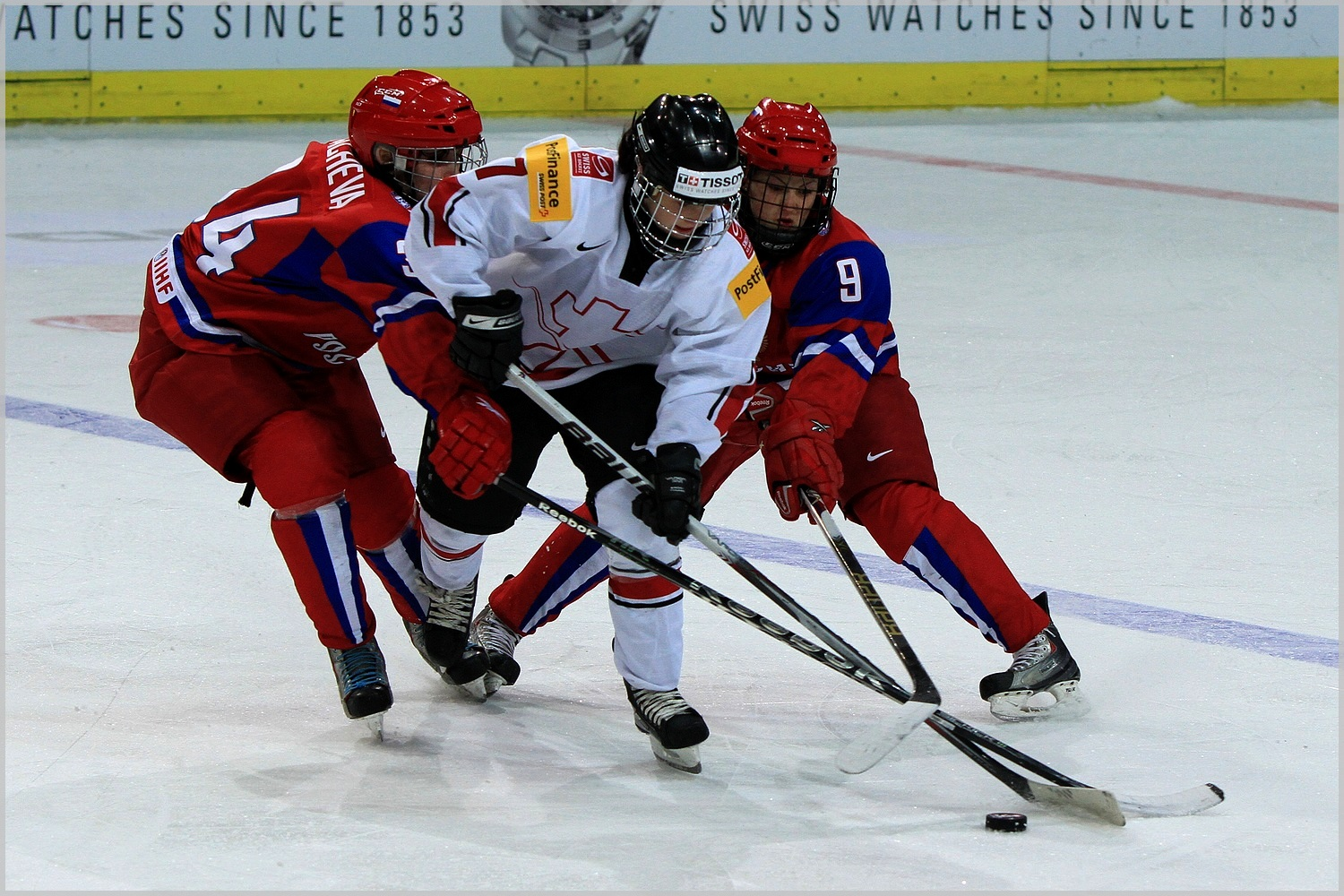
Svetlana Tkacheva (l) Darcia Leimgruber (c) Alexandra Vafina (r)

Leimgruber played hockey at Middle Economy School/DHC Langenthal under coach Hans Brechbühler. She earned a gold medal with DHC Langenthal at the Swiss Championships in 2007–08 and a silver medal at the Swiss Championships in 2008–09. She played for the fourth place Swiss team at the World Women's Championship in China. In addition, she was voted one of the most valuable players of the World Women's Championship in Finland. In a game versus Russia at the 2012 IIHF Women's World Championship, Leimgruber logged an assist in a 5–2 victory, as Switzerland advanced to the semifinals.

=== Maine ===
Leimgruber has appeared in six games for the Black Bears, scoring her first collegiate goal at Union College on Dec. 11, 2009. She also has recorded an assist to go along with her goal for a total of two points on the season.

== Career stats ==
=== Maine ===
Season	Games played	Goals	Assists	Points	Shots	Penalty Minutes	Plus/Minus
2009–10	6	1	1	2	6	4	+2

=== Olympics ===
Season	Games played	Goals	Assists	Points	Penalty Minutes	Plus/Minus
2010 Olympics (on-going)	3	0	2	2	4	−2
