= Gutterson Fieldhouse =

Hockey arena in Burlington, Vermont, US

Coordinates: 44.469171°N 73.194362°W

Albert L. Gutterson Fieldhouse
- "The Gut"
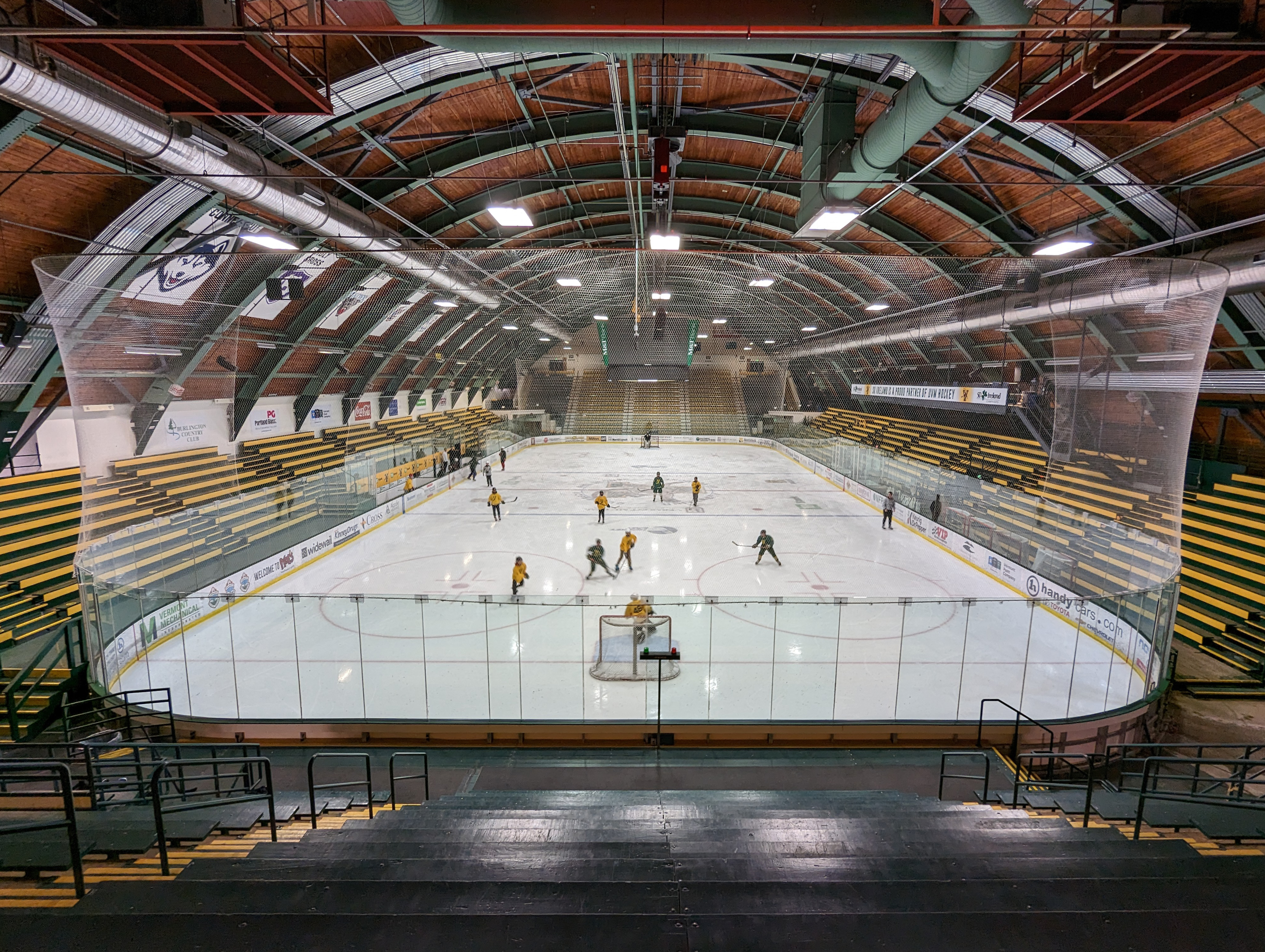
- Gutterson Fieldhouse interior in March 2023
- Interactive map of Albert L. Gutterson Fieldhouse
- Location: Burlington, Vermont, US
- Owner: University of Vermont
- Operator: University of Vermont
- Capacity: 4,035 (ice hockey)
- Surface: 200 x 90 ft (ice hockey)

Construction
- Groundbreaking: 1961
- Opened: 1963
- Architect: Freeman French Freeman

Tenants
- Vermont Catamounts (NCAA); Men's ice hockey (1963–present); Women's ice hockey (1998–present); Vermont Bucks (Can-Am) (2017)

The Albert L. Gutterson Fieldhouse (nicknamed "The Gut") is a 4,035-seat hockey arena in Burlington, Vermont, United States. It is home to the Vermont Catamounts men's and women's ice hockey teams. It is the largest indoor arena in the state of Vermont. It is adjacent to Patrick Gymnasium and Forbush Natatorium at the school's athletic complex. It is named for Albert Gutterson, class of 1912, the school's first Olympian. He set an Olympic record with a 7.60 meter long jump, beating, among others, the great Jim Thorpe.

== History ==
The barrel-vaulted arena opened in 1963, originally seating 3,335, with a rink 190 x 85 feet, and the Catamounts varsity hockey program was established the same year. In 1990, the arena was extended eastward to expand the rink to 200 x 90 feet, add an additional row of 700 seats, and add a new lobby, concession, and restroom area. New locker rooms were also added to the north, enough to accommodate six teams at once, along with offices and a varsity weight room.

The hockey team has played host to exhibitions with the Soviet Union national ice hockey team, Russia women's national ice hockey team, and United States men's national ice hockey team and United States women's national ice hockey team. It was the venue for the first women's hockey game ever nationally televised in the US (on December 17, 1997, a pre-Olympic game between Canada and the United States). Between 1995 and 2000, and again in 2002, it was the preseason training camp site of the New York Rangers. (The Hartford Whalers had previously held their 1992 and 1993 training camps there.)

On March 30, 2012, President Barack Obama made his first public appearance in the State of Vermont at the Gutterson Fieldhouse. However, he did speak previously to students on campus at UVM campaigning for Senator Bernie Sanders (I-VT) in 2006, outside of Ira Allen Chapel.

The Vermont Principal's Association (VPA) has held the boys' and girls' high school state ice hockey championships at the venue since 1976 (boys) and 2011 (girls).

Gutterson Fieldhouse, along with Cairns Arena in nearby South Burlington, served as venues for the 2012 IIHF Women's World Championship.

In July 2016, the Vermont Bucks, an indoor football team, was announced as a 2017 expansion team as part of American Indoor Football (AIF) and would use the arena for home games. The AIF would fold before the Bucks could play in the league, but team owner Tim Viens started the Can-Am Indoor Football League for the 2017 season. The Can-Am then merged into the American Arena League after one season of play, but Viens sold the Bucks and the Bucks would eventually fold before playing in the new league.
