= Meaghan Mikkelson =

Canadian ice hockey player (born 1985)

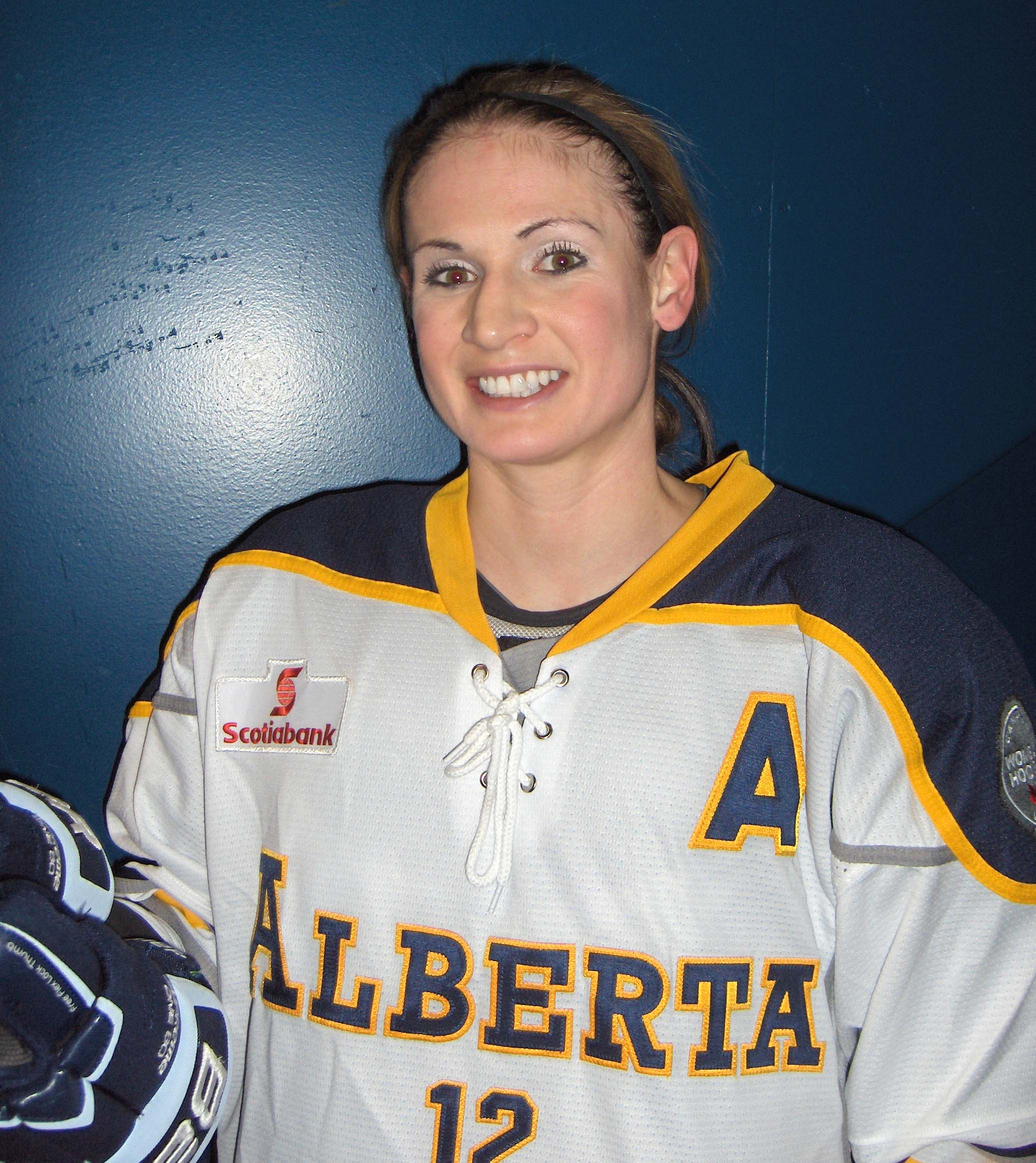
- Born: January 4, 1985 (age 41) Regina, Saskatchewan, Canada
- Height: 5 ft 9 in (175 cm)
- Weight: 139 lb (63 kg; 9 st 13 lb)
- Position: Defence
- Shoots: Right
- PWHPA team Former teams: Calgary: Wisconsin Badgers; Edmonton Chimos; Calgary Inferno
- National team: Canada
- Playing career: 2003–present
- Website: meaghanmikkelson.com
Medal record
Olympic Games
Gold medal – first place	2010 Vancouver	Team
Gold medal – first place	2014 Sochi	Team
Silver medal – second place	2018 Pyeongchang	Team
World Championships
Gold medal – first place	2012 United States
Gold medal – first place	2022 Denmark
Silver medal – second place	2008 China
Silver medal – second place	2009 Finland
Silver medal – second place	2011 Switzerland
Silver medal – second place	2013 Canada
Silver medal – second place	2016 Canada
Silver medal – second place	2017 United States

Meaghan Mikkelson (born January 4, 1985) is a Canadian ice hockey player, broadcaster, and former member of the Canadian national ice hockey team. She is currently affiliated with the Calgary chapter of the Professional Women's Hockey Players Association (PWHPA).

== Playing career ==
Mikkelson grew up in St. Albert, Alberta, and represented Team Alberta at the 2003 Canada Winter Games in Bathurst and Campbellton, New Brunswick, as the Alberta team finished in seventh position.

=== Wisconsin Badgers ===
In 2007, Mikkelson tied for 11th in the NCAA with 42 points in 34 games and tied for sixth with 32 assists. Among defencemen, she was second in the country during the regular season with 1.24 points per game and ninth overall with .94 assists per game. During the 2006–07 NCAA season, she was part of the Wisconsin defence that allowed a nation's best 0.94 goals per game and 15 shutouts, a school record. In the WCHA, she led all defencemen with 33 points in 28 league games and was fifth overall. She tied for second in the league with 24 assists.

=== Hockey Canada ===
Mikkelson made her Team Canada debut with the National Women's Team at the 2007 Fall Festival. She appeared in her first IIHF World Women's Championship in 2008. In the gold medal game of the 2010 Four Nations Cup, she had a goal and an assist for Canada. With 1:49 left in the second period, she scored to tie the game and force overtime. In a game versus Russia at the 2012 IIHF Women's World Championship, she registered three assists in a 14–1 victory. She won a gold medal during the 2010 Winter Olympics and was named to the 2014 Winter Olympics roster for Canada, when she again won a gold medal. She won a silver medal at the 2018 Winter Olympics.

=== CWHL ===
Prior to being selected third overall in the 2011 Draft of the Canadian Women's Hockey League, Mikkelson played with the Edmonton Chimos of the Western Women's Hockey League (WWHL). She was selected by the Alberta Honeybadgers, a team later renamed as Team Alberta CWHL but eventually called the Calgary Inferno. Appearing in the 2016 Clarkson Cup, she registered one assist as the Inferno emerged victorious in the 8–3 final game win. She was one of two captains for Team Blue in the 3rd CWHL All-Star Game, the first time that one team in the CWHL All-Star Game had two captains.

== Awards and honours ==
- 2007, All-WCHA defenceman
- 2007, All-WCHA First Team
- 2007, WCHA Defensive Player of the Year
- 2007, Top 10 candidate for the 2007 Patty Kazmaier Award
- Directorate Award, Best Defender, 2011 IIHF Women's World Championship
- Media All-Star team, 2011 IIHF Women's World Championship

== Broadcasting career ==
Mikkelson is currently a commentator on Calgary Flames radio game broadcasts after occasionally appearing on televised NHL games on Sportsnet since 2020 as an analyst on intermission panel discussion segments.

Mikkelson has worked as an ice level analyst and reporter for the Stanley Cup Playoffs on TNT in 2022 and 2024.

== Personal life ==
In June 2011, Mikkelson married minor league goaltender Scott Reid. The couple met in 2007 when they worked together at a hockey school in Edmonton. Their son was born in September 2015 in Calgary, and their daughter was born four years later.

She participated in various festivities commemorating the 2012 NHL All-Star Game in Ottawa, Ontario. Said festivities included attendance at Rideau Hall for the NHL Hockey is for Everyone event, interviews at the Sirius XM Stage (along with a fan question and answer period) at the Scotiabank NHL Fan Fair. In addition, she participated in the Energizer Night Skate at the Ottawa Rink of Dreams (relocated from the Rideau Canal), and attended the Molson Canadian NHL All-Star Skills Competition on Saturday, January 28.

In June 2014, Mikkelson and her teammate Natalie Spooner appeared as contestants in the second season of The Amazing Race Canada. They finished the race in 2nd place. At the end of the show, after arriving in first place for seven times in a total of eleven legs, the golden girls got the official second place of the competition, losing to the best buddies, Mickey and Pete. She and Spooner were voted the fan favourite team of the season.

Her father, Bill Mikkelson, played four seasons in the NHL in the early 1970s with the Los Angeles Kings, the New York Islanders and the Washington Capitals. Her brother, Brendan, was a Memorial Cup champion with the WHL's Vancouver Giants, a second round pick, 31st overall, in the 2005 NHL entry draft, played five seasons in the NHL and now plays for the Cardiff Devils in the Elite Ice Hockey League (EIHL). Her great uncle, Jim McFadden, won the Calder Memorial Trophy in 1948, and the Stanley Cup in 1950.
