= Briercrest Christian Academy =

Private Christian high school in Caronport

Coordinates: 50.4568°N 105.8161°W

- Caronport, Saskatchewan; Canada

Information
- Former name: Caronport High School
- Religious affiliation: Briercrest College and Seminary
- Established: 1946; 80 years ago

Briercrest Christian Academy, formerly Caronport High School, is a private Christian high school located in Caronport, Saskatchewan, Canada. The school includes a student residence program and extracurricular activities such as sports, drama, art and music. It is operated by Briercrest College and Seminary. It was founded in 1946, 11 years after the formation of the college and seminary.
