= 2016–17 EHL Premier season =

- League: Eastern Hockey League
- Sport: Ice hockey
- Duration: Regular season September 2016 – March 2017; Postseason; March 2017
- Games: 48
- Teams: 17

Regular season
- Season champions: Philadelphia Little Flyers

EHL Playoffs
- Finals champions: Philadelphia Jr. Flyers
- Runners-up: Philadelphia Little Flyers

EHL seasons
- ← 2015–16 2017–18 →

The 2016–17 EHL Premier season was the 4th season of the Eastern Hockey League. The regular season ran from September 2016 to March 2017 with a 48-game schedule for each team. The Philadelphia Little Flyers won the regular season championship and went on to be defeated by the Philadelphia Jr. Flyers 3 games to 2 for the league championship.

== Member changes ==
- In May 2016, Craig Doremus, the head coach/GM of the New York Bobcats, left the club to take a similar role with the New Jersey Titans. The Bobcats were unable to fill his role in time for this season and, as a result, were forced to withdraw from the league. The team would return the following year.

== Regular season ==
The standings at the end of the regular season were as follows:

Note: x = clinched playoff berth; y = clinched division title; z = clinched conference title; r = clinched regular season title

=== Standings ===
==== Northern Conference ====
- New England Division -

Team	GP	W	L	OTL	Pts	GF	GA
xyz – New Hampshire Junior Monarchs	48	33	11	4	70	171	114
x – Northern Cyclones	48	24	19	5	53	129	133
x – Vermont Lumberjacks	48	22	18	8	52	158	140
New England Wolves	48	8	36	4	20	98	196

- Boston Division -

Team	GP	W	L	OTL	Pts	GF	GA
xy – Valley Jr. Warriors	48	32	13	3	67	178	127
x – Boston Junior Rangers	48	28	17	3	59	140	135
x – Walpole Express	48	24	20	4	52	144	147
x – East Coast Wizards	48	21	20	7	49	145	155
x – Boston Bandits	48	23	24	1	47	146	163

==== Southern Conference ====
- Central Division -

Team	GP	W	L	OTL	Pts	GF	GA
xy – Connecticut Oilers	48	17	27	4	38	145	208
x – Hartford Jr. Wolfpack	48	17	29	2	36	125	162
x – New York Apple Core	48	14	30	4	32	129	214
x – Connecticut Nighthawks	48	13	34	1	27	91	184

- Mid-Atlantic Division -

Team	GP	W	L	OTL	Pts	GF	GA
xyzr – Philadelphia Little Flyers	48	39	4	5	83	194	74
x – Philadelphia Jr. Flyers	48	36	8	4	76	163	88
x – Philadelphia Revolution	48	31	14	3	65	180	120
x – New Jersey Rockets	48	26	20	2	54	167	141

== EHL playoffs ==
Note: Division Winners receive the top two seeds in each conference with the rest of the teams being seeded based upon regular season record.
Note: After the first round, all teams were reseeded with no respect to either conference or division.

Conference Quarterfinals (Best-of-3)	Quarterfinals (Best-of-3)
N1	New Hampshire Junior Monarchs	2
N8	Boston Bandits	0
1	Philadelphia Little Flyers	2
8	New York Apple Core	0
N2	Valley Jr. Warriors	1
N7	East Coast Wizards	2
Northern
N3	Boston Junior Rangers	2
N6	Vermont Lumberjacks	1
2	Philadelphia Jr. Flyers	2
7	East Coast Wizards	1
N4	Northern Cyclones	2
N5	Walpole Express	0
S1	Philadelphia Little Flyers	2
S8	Connecticut Nighthawks	1
3	New Hampshire Junior Monarchs	2
6	Northern Cyclones	0
S2	Connecticut Oilers	0
S7	New York Apple Core	2
Southern
S3	Philadelphia Jr. Flyers	2
S6	Hartford Jr. Wolfpack	0
4	Boston Junior Rangers	1
5	New Jersey Rockets	2
S4	Philadelphia Revolution	0
S5	New Jersey Rockets	2

Semifinals (Best-of-3)
1	Philadelphia Little Flyers	2
5	New Jersey Rockets	0
2	Philadelphia Jr. Flyers	2
3	New Hampshire Junior Monarchs	0

Championship (Best-of-5)
1	Philadelphia Little Flyers	2
2	Philadelphia Jr. Flyers	3

Note: * denotes overtime period(s)
