= John Marino =

American ice hockey player (born 1997)

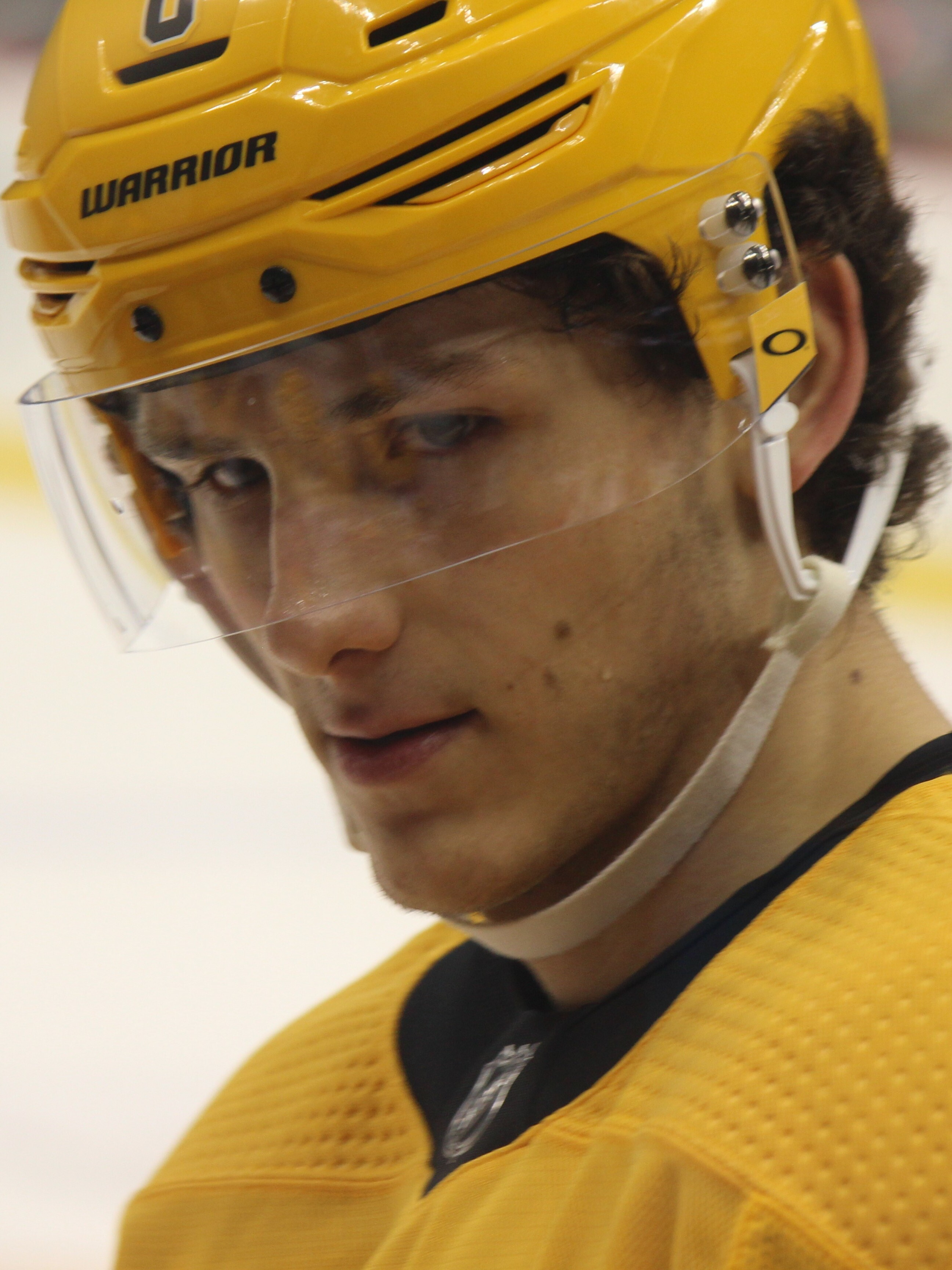
- Marino with the Pittsburgh Penguins in 2019
- Born: May 21, 1997 (age 29) Easton, Massachusetts, U.S.
- Height: 6 ft 1 in (185 cm)
- Weight: 200 lb (91 kg; 14 st 4 lb)
- Position: Defense
- Shoots: Right
- NHL team Former teams: Utah Mammoth; Pittsburgh Penguins; New Jersey Devils
- NHL draft: 154th overall, 2015; Edmonton Oilers
- Playing career: 2019–present

John Marino (born May 21, 1997) is an American professional ice hockey player who is a defenseman for the Utah Mammoth of the National Hockey League (NHL). He was drafted by the Edmonton Oilers, 154th overall, in the 2015 NHL entry draft.

== Personal life ==
Marino was the second of two sons born on May 21, 1997, in Easton, Massachusetts, U.S., to parents Jen and Paul II. Both Marino and his twin brother Paul III weighed over seven pounds, leading doctors to believe one of them would be born with a condition. After Paul III was born with bowed legs, a doctor at Boston Children's Hospital suggested their parents enroll him in hockey lessons. This was because the stride needed for hockey could allow a natural process for his legs to straighten. Jen and Paul II thus decided to enroll both of their sons in hockey lessons at nearly two years old.

== Playing career ==
=== Amateur ===
Marino played junior hockey with the South Shore Kings in the United States Premier Hockey League before he was selected in the fifth-round, 154th overall, by the Edmonton Oilers in the 2015 NHL entry draft. After a single season with the Tri-City Storm in the United States Hockey League (USHL), he committed to a collegiate career with Harvard University of the ECAC.

Marino played college hockey at Harvard from 2016 to 2019. He scored his first collegiate goal on October 28, 2016, against Arizona State. In 2016–17, Marino was named Second Team All-Ivy League.

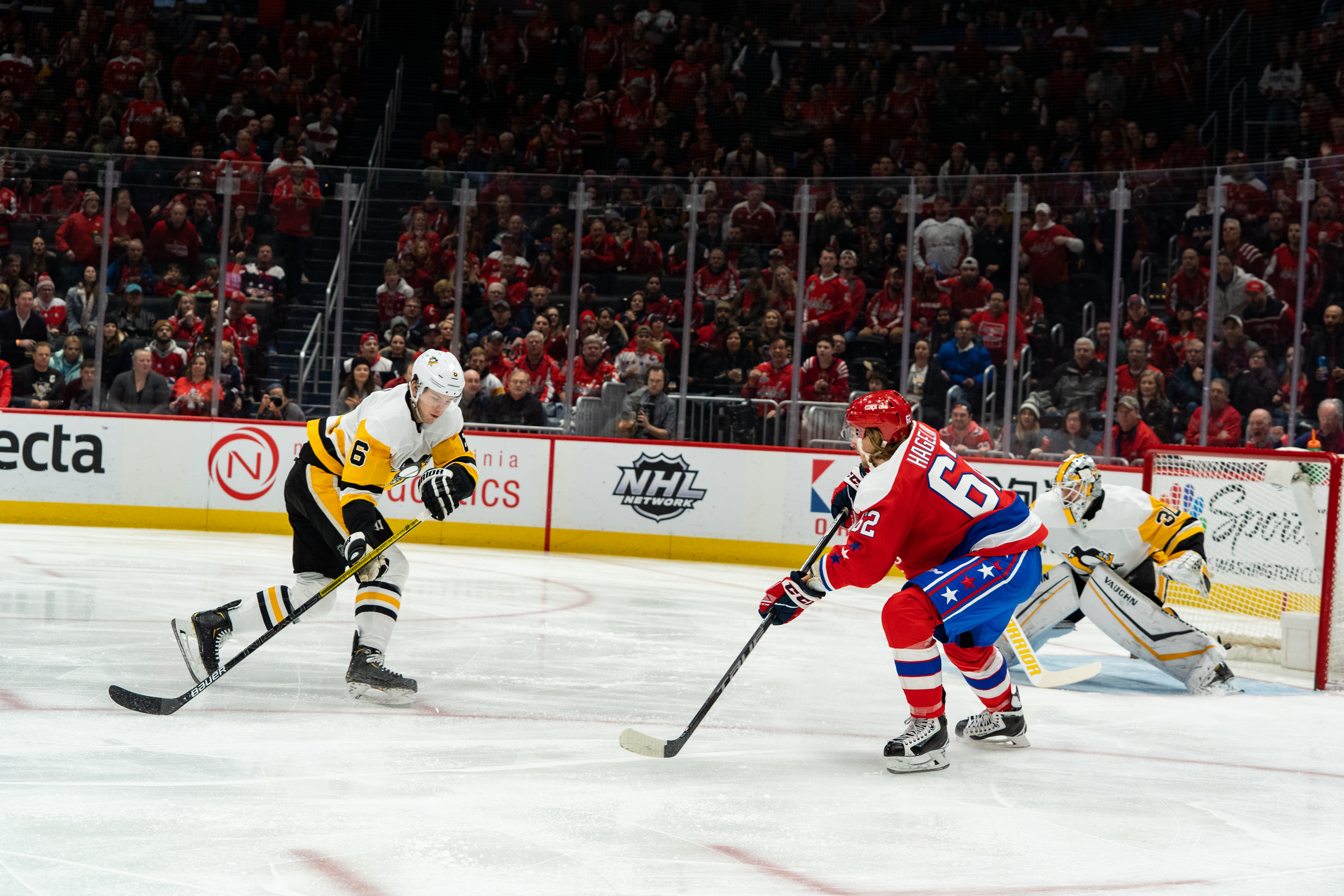
Marino defending against Carl Hagelin in February 2020

=== Professional (2019–present) ===
==== Pittsburgh Penguins ====
On July 26, 2019, Marino was acquired by the Pittsburgh Penguins in exchange for a sixth-round pick. On August 8, 2019, he left the college ranks as he was signed to a two-year, entry-level contract with the Penguins.

Marino made his NHL debut on October 8, 2019, in Pittsburgh's game against the Winnipeg Jets. He scored his first NHL goal on November 4, against Jaroslav Halak of the Boston Bruins. On February 6, 2020, in a game against the Tampa Bay Lightning, Marino sustained a broken cheekbone after getting hit in the face by a puck from a slapshot by Lightning’ captain Steven Stamkos. This injury would cause Marino to miss the next 11 games.

Prior to the start of the 2021–22 season, Marino trained with Brian Dumoulin in Boston. Together, they would skate before working out at the home gym in Dumoulin's garage in Charlestown. On January 3, 2021, Marino signed a six-year, $26.4 million contract extension with the Penguins.

==== New Jersey Devils ====
On July 16, 2022, Marino was traded by the Penguins to the New Jersey Devils in return for Ty Smith and a 2023 third-round pick.

==== Utah Hockey Club ====
On June 29, 2024, the Devils traded Marino and a 2024 fifth-round pick to the Utah Hockey Club in exchange for a 2024 second-round pick, and a 2025 second-round pick.

On July 21, 2026, Marino extended his tenure in Utah, agreeing to an eight-year, $54 million contract extension.

== Career statistics ==
			Regular season					Playoffs
Season	Team	League	GP	G	A	Pts	PIM	GP	G	A	Pts	PIM
2012–13	South Shore Kings	EJHL	37	3	31	34	12	6	0	3	3	6
2012–13	South Shore Kings	EmJHL	39	4	31	35	12	—	—	—	—	—
2013–14	South Shore Kings	USPHL	34	6	11	17	16	5	0	2	2	2
2014–15	South Shore Kings	USPHL	49	4	24	28	42	5	0	2	2	6
2015–16	Tri–City Storm	USHL	56	5	25	30	43	11	0	2	2	6
2016–17	Harvard University	ECAC	35	2	13	15	24	—	—	—	—	—
2017–18	Harvard University	ECAC	33	2	14	16	10	—	—	—	—	—
2018–19	Harvard University	ECAC	33	3	8	11	20	—	—	—	—	—
2019–20	Pittsburgh Penguins	NHL	56	6	20	26	20	4	0	1	1	2
2020–21	Pittsburgh Penguins	NHL	52	3	10	13	8	6	0	0	0	6
2021–22	Pittsburgh Penguins	NHL	81	1	24	25	23	7	0	1	1	2
2022–23	New Jersey Devils	NHL	64	4	14	18	20	12	0	4	4	0
2023–24	New Jersey Devils	NHL	75	4	21	25	41	—	—	—	—	—
2024–25	Utah Hockey Club	NHL	35	1	13	14	2	—	—	—	—	—
2025–26	Utah Mammoth	NHL	80	4	32	36	16	6	1	0	1	0
NHL totals			443	23	134	157	130	35	1	6	7	10

== Awards and honours ==
Award	Year
USHL
Clark Cup champion	2016
College
All-Ivy League Second Team	2017
