= 2014–15 EHL season =

- League: Eastern Hockey League
- Sport: Ice hockey
- Duration: Regular season September 2014 – March 2015; Postseason; March 2015
- Games: 44
- Teams: 19

Regular season
- Season champions: Philadelphia Little Flyers

EHL Playoffs
- Finals champions: vacant
- Runners-up: Northern Cyclones

EHL seasons
- ← 2013–14 2015–16 →

The 2014–15 EHL season was the 2nd season of the Eastern Hockey League. The regular season ran from September 2014 to March 2015 with a 44-game schedule for each team. The Philadelphia Little Flyers won the regular season championship. The Connecticut Oilers defeated the Northern Cyclones 3 games to 2 for the league championship, however, the Oilers were subsequently stripped of their title. USA Hockey determined that the team had used two players from Sweden who were ineligible due to errors with their paperwork.

== Member changes ==
- The New Hampshire/Laconia Leafs franchise rebranded as the New England Wolves and returned from their one-year hiatus.
- The East Coast Wizards joined the league as an expansion franchise.

== Regular season ==
The standings at the end of the regular season were as follows:

Note: x = clinched playoff berth; y = clinched division title; z = clinched regular season title

=== Standings ===
==== Boston Division ====
| Team | GP | W | L | OTL | SOL | Pts | GF | GA |
|---|---|---|---|---|---|---|---|---|
| xy – Walpole Express | 44 | 29 | 9 | 5 | 1 | 64 | 154 | 121 |
| x – East Coast Wizards | 44 | 21 | 20 | 2 | 1 | 45 | 121 | 142 |
| x – Boston Bandits | 44 | 18 | 20 | 2 | 4 | 42 | 118 | 138 |
| x – Boston Junior Rangers | 44 | 18 | 22 | 1 | 3 | 40 | 122 | 128 |
| x – Valley Jr. Warriors | 44 | 16 | 27 | 0 | 1 | 33 | 105 | 141 |

==== Central Division ====
| Team | GP | W | L | OTL | SOL | Pts | GF | GA |
|---|---|---|---|---|---|---|---|---|
| xy – Connecticut Oilers | 44 | 31 | 11 | 1 | 1 | 64 | 183 | 103 |
| x – Wilkes-Barre/Scranton Knights | 44 | 28 | 14 | 2 | 0 | 58 | 155 | 126 |
| x – New York Bobcats | 44 | 26 | 16 | 1 | 1 | 54 | 156 | 131 |
| x – Hartford Jr. Wolfpack | 44 | 24 | 17 | 0 | 3 | 51 | 167 | 133 |
| x – New York Apple Core | 44 | 19 | 22 | 1 | 2 | 41 | 135 | 164 |

==== North Division ====
| Team | GP | W | L | OTL | SOL | Pts | GF | GA |
|---|---|---|---|---|---|---|---|---|
| xy – New Hampshire Junior Monarchs | 44 | 34 | 7 | 1 | 2 | 71 | 159 | 89 |
| x – Northern Cyclones | 44 | 32 | 8 | 3 | 1 | 68 | 178 | 99 |
| x – Vermont Lumberjacks | 44 | 16 | 24 | 3 | 1 | 36 | 107 | 154 |
| New England Wolves | 44 | 13 | 29 | 1 | 1 | 28 | 92 | 169 |

==== South Division ====
| Team | GP | W | L | OTL | SOL | Pts | GF | GA |
|---|---|---|---|---|---|---|---|---|
| xyz – Philadelphia Little Flyers | 44 | 27 | 3 | 2 | 2 | 78 | 206 | 75 |
| x – Philadelphia Jr. Flyers | 44 | 23 | 19 | 1 | 1 | 48 | 124 | 122 |
| x – New Jersey Rockets | 44 | 16 | 25 | 1 | 2 | 35 | 126 | 191 |
| New Jersey Titans | 44 | 9 | 28 | 3 | 4 | 25 | 92 | 185 |
| Philadelphia Revolution | 44 | 8 | 32 | 4 | 0 | 20 | 87 | 176 |

== EHL playoffs ==
Note: Division Winners were seeded 1-4 followed by the next 12 teams based upon their overall record.
Teams are reseeded after each round irrespective of division rank.

First Round (Best-of-3)
S1 | Philadelphia Little Flyers | 9 | 6 | -
16 | Valley Jr. Warriors | 0 | 1 | -
N1 | New Hampshire Junior Monarchs | 3 | 7 | -
15 | New Jersey Rockets | 0 | 2 | -
E1 | Walpole Express | 3 | 5 | -
14 | Vermont Lumberjacks | 0 | 2 | -
C1 | Connecticut Oilers | 6 | 6 | -
13 | Boston Junior Rangers | 3 | 3 | -
5 | Northern Cyclones | 4 | 7 | -
12 | New York Apple Core | 2 | 3 | -
6 | Wilkes-Barre/Scranton Knights | 5 | 6 | 7
11 | Boston Bandits | 8 | 1 | 4
7 | New York Bobcats | 1 | 4 | 3
10 | East Coast Wizards | 3 | 2 | 2
8 | Harford Jr. Wolfpack | 3 | 6 | -
9 | Philadelphia Jr. Flyers | 2 | 3 | -

Quarterfinals (Best-of-3)
1 | Philadelphia Little Flyers | 9 | 10 | -
8 | Harford Jr. Wolfpack | 2 | 1 | -
2 | New Hampshire Junior Monarchs | 2 | 3 | 2*
7 | New York Bobcats | 0 | 4 | 1
3 | Northern Cyclones | 4* | 3 | -
6 | Wilkes-Barre/Scranton Knights | 3 | 0 | -
4 | Walpole Express | 2 | 1 | -
5 | Connecticut Oilers | 3 | 2 | -

Semifinals (Best-of-3)
1 | Philadelphia Little Flyers | 1 | 1 | -
5 | Connecticut Oilers | 4 | 6 | -
2 | New Hampshire Junior Monarchs | 1 | 2 | -
3 | Northern Cyclones | 4 | 3** | -

Championship (Best-of-5)
5 | Connecticut Oilers | 3 | 8 | 3 | 3 | 4
3 | Northern Cyclones | 4 | 5 | 4* | 1 | 1

Note: * denotes overtime period(s)

The Connecticut Oilers won the tournament and advanced to the USA Hockey National Junior Tier III Championship. However, while USA Hockey was reviewing the players and teams for the national series, discrepancies were found in the paperwork of two Swedish players on the Oilers. As a result, the two players were ruled ineligible and the Northern Cyclones were instead awarded the league bid to the championship. Additionally, the Oilers were retroactively stripped of the league title and the EHL decided to leave the championship position as "vacant" for the season.
