= 2013–14 EHL season =

- League: Eastern Hockey League
- Sport: Ice hockey
- Duration: Regular season September 2013 – March 2014; Postseason; March 2014
- Games: 44
- Teams: 17

Regular season
- Season champions: New Hampshire Junior Monarchs

EHL Playoffs
- Finals champions: Northern Cyclones
- Runners-up: New Hampshire Junior Monarchs

EHL seasons
- 2014–15 →

The 2013–14 EHL season was the inaugural season of the Eastern Hockey League. The regular season ran from September 2013 to March 2014 with a 44-game schedule for each team. The New Hampshire Junior Monarchs won the regular season championship and went on to be defeated by the Northern Cyclones 3 games to 2 for the league championship.

== League Foundation ==
In 2013, the Atlantic Junior Hockey League was affected by a sizable shift in junior hockey that saw the formation or dissolution of several leagues. Six former members of the Eastern Junior Hockey League (the Boston Bandits, Connecticut Oilers, New Hampshire Jr. Monarchs, New York Apple Core, Philadelphia Revolution, and Valley Jr. Warriors) joined the league witch then rebranded as the Eastern Hockey League, taking the same name as two former minor leagues.

== Member changes ==
- The Laconia Leafs rebranded as the New Hampshire Leafs during the summer. However, before the start of the season, the team withdrew from the league. They would return the following season as the New England Wolves.
- The Connecticut Jr. Wolfpack rebranded as the Hartford Jr. Wolfpack.

== Regular season ==
The standings at the end of the regular season were as follows:

Note: y = clinched division title; z = clinched regular season title

=== Standings ===
==== East Division ====
Team	GP	W	L	T	OTL	Pts	GF	GA
y – Connecticut Oilers	44	26	13	3	2	57	170	121
New York Bobcats	44	23	15	5	1	52	146	132
Hartford Jr. Wolfpack	44	20	16	4	4	48	125	121
Wilkes-Barre/Scranton Knights	44	19	16	8	1	47	121	111
New York Apple Core	44	20	21	1	2	43	141	155
Walpole Express	44	13	22	7	2	35	110	150

==== North Division ====
Team	GP	W	L	T	OTL	Pts	GF	GA
yz – New Hampshire Junior Monarchs	44	35	8	1	0	71	182	89
Northern Cyclones	44	32	10	2	0	66	179	106
Boston Bandits	44	22	17	3	2	49	149	136
Boston Junior Rangers	44	18	21	2	3	41	120	149
Valley Jr. Warriors	44	16	20	3	5	40	121	146

==== South Division ====
Team	GP	W	L	T	OTL	Pts	GF	GA
y – Philadelphia Little Flyers	44	28	11	2	3	61	169	93
New Jersey Rockets	44	21	20	2	1	45	132	162
Philadelphia Jr. Flyers	44	19	18	7	0	45	113	107
Philadelphia Revolution	44	19	23	2	0	40	124	158
New Jersey Titans	44	10	28	3	3	26	115	168
Washington Junior Nationals	44	5	37	1	1	12	80	193

== EHL playoffs ==
Note: The division winners were seeded 1-3 while the remaining teams were sorted based upon their regular season record.
Teams are reseeded after the First Round with no respect to division champions.

Play-in (Best-of-1)
16	New Jersey Titans	8
17	Washington Junior Nationals	2

First Round (Best-of-3)
1	New Hampshire Junior Monarchs	3	6	-
16	New Jersey Titans	0	2	-
2	Philadelphia Little Flyers	4	4	-
15	Walpole Express	1	1	-
3	Connecticut Oilers	1	4	2
14	Valley Jr. Warriors	3	3	5
4	Northern Cyclones	3	4	-
13	Philadelphia Revolution	2	2	-
5	New York Bobcats	3	5	-
12	Boston Junior Rangers	1	4	-
6	Boston Bandits	6	4	-
11	New York Apple Core	4	2	-
7	Harford Jr. Wolfpack	5	5	-
10	New Jersey Rockets	4	0	-
8	Wilkes-Barre/Scranton Knights	5	4	-
9	Philadelphia Jr. Flyers	3	3	-

Quarterfinals (Best-of-3)
1	New Hampshire Junior Monarchs	4	6	-
8	Valley Jr. Warriors	1	2	-
2	Northern Cyclones	2	5	-
7	Wilkes-Barre/Scranton Knights	1	4	-
3	Philadelphia Little Flyers	3	2	5
6	Hartford Jr. Wolfpack	2	3	0
4	New York Bobcats	2	3	-
5	Boston Bandits	3	5	-

Semifinals (Best-of-3)
1	New Hampshire Junior Monarchs	2	3	6
5	Boston Bandits	3	2	2
2	Northern Cyclones	6	3	-
3	Philadelphia Little Flyers	2	2	-

Championship (Best-of-5)
1	New Hampshire Junior Monarchs	2	4	3	1	2
2	Northern Cyclones	1	2	4***	6	3

Note: * denotes overtime period(s)

The Northern Cyclones advanced to the USA Hockey National Junior Tier III Championship. The New Hampshire Junior Monarchs played the runners-up of the Metropolitan Junior Hockey League for an at-large bid. New Hampshire won and also participated.
