= 2015–16 EHL Premier season =

- League: Eastern Hockey League
- Sport: Ice hockey
- Duration: Regular season September 2015 – March 2016; Postseason; March 2016
- Games: 41
- Teams: 18

Regular season
- Season champions: Philadelphia Little Flyers

EHL Playoffs
- Finals champions: New Hampshire Junior Monarchs
- Runners-up: Philadelphia Little Flyers

EHL seasons
- ← 2014–15 2016–17 →

The 2015–16 EHL Premier season was the 3rd season of the Eastern Hockey League. The regular season ran from September 2015 to March 2016 with a 41-game schedule for each team. The Philadelphia Little Flyers won the regular season championship and went on to be defeated by the New Hampshire Junior Monarchs 3 games to 0 for the league championship.

== League structure ==
During the offseason, the Eastern Hockey League began a secondary under-19 league. The top league was given a new moniker as the "Premier" Division while the secondary league was called the "Elite" Division to distinguish the two.

== Member changes ==
- The league approved the transfer of the Connecticut Nighthawks from the Metropolitan Junior Hockey League.
- On May 1, 2015, the Wilkes-Barre/Scranton Knights announced the purchase of the dormant Dawson Creek Rage franchise. The organization was set to begin play in the Tier II North American Hockey League the following fall. As a result, the club suspended their Tier III franchise. The Knights' EHL team would return to play in 2017.
- Shortly afterwards, the New Jersey Titans origination purchased the Soo Eagles' NAHL franchise rights. Similar to the Knights, the Titans transferred their focus to their new Tier II club and disbanded the Tier III club.

== Regular season ==
The standings at the end of the regular season were as follows:

Note: x = clinched playoff berth; y = clinched conference title; z = clinched regular season title

=== Standings ===
==== Northern Conference ====
Team	GP	W	L	OTL	Pts	GF	GA
xy – Boston Bandits	41	30	7	4	64	155	93
x – New Hampshire Junior Monarchs	41	28	7	6	62	179	109
x – Northern Cyclones	41	25	15	1	51	163	113
x – Walpole Express	41	20	13	8	48	116	107
x – Boston Junior Rangers	41	18	19	4	40	124	124
x – Valley Jr. Warriors	41	18	21	2	38	109	133
x – Vermont Lumberjacks	41	17	22	2	36	113	130
x – New England Wolves	41	11	29	1	23	95	216
East Coast Wizards	41	8	32	1	17	84	164

==== Southern Conference ====
Team	GP	W	L	OTL	Pts	GF	GA
xyz – Philadelphia Little Flyers	41	33	8	0	66	197	83
x – Connecticut Oilers	41	28	11	2	58	159	130
x – Hartford Jr. Wolfpack	41	26	10	5	57	159	146
x – Philadelphia Revolution	41	26	12	3	55	138	102
x – New York Bobcats	41	25	12	4	54	173	121
x – Philadelphia Jr. Flyers	41	19	15	7	45	134	129
x – New Jersey Rockets	41	20	18	3	43	163	162
x – Connecticut Nighthawks	41	11	28	2	24	91	174
New York Apple Core	41	6	31	4	16	71	187

== EHL playoffs ==
Conference Quarterfinals (Best-of-3)	Conference Semifinals (Best-of-3)
N1	Boston Bandits	2	6	-
N8	New England Wolves	1	1	-
N1	Boston Bandits	1	1	-
N4	Walpole Express	2	2*	-
N2	New Hampshire Junior Monarchs	6	4	-
N7	Vermont Lumberjacks	3	0	-
Northern
N3	Northern Cyclones	6	4	3
N6	Valley Jr. Warriors	3	5	1
N2	New Hampshire Junior Monarchs	6	3	2*
N3	Northern Cyclones	3	4*	1
N4	Walpole Express	2**	4	-
N5	Boston Junior Rangers	1	1	-
S1	Philadelphia Little Flyers	3	5	-
S8	Connecticut Nighthawks	0	2	-
S1	Philadelphia Little Flyers	5*	3	-
S4	Philadelphia Revolution	4	1	-
S2	Connecticut Oilers	7	3*	-
S7	New Jersey Rockets	5	2	-
Southern
S3	Hartford Jr. Wolfpack	2	5	3
S6	Philadelphia Jr. Flyers	4	2	2
S2	Connecticut Oilers	5	5	-
S3	Hartford Jr. Wolfpack	4	3	-
S4	Philadelphia Revolution	5	6	-
S5	New York Bobcats	3	4	-

Semifinals (Best-of-3)
N2	New Hampshire Junior Monarchs	6	5	-
S2	Connecticut Oilers	2	1	-
S1	Philadelphia Little Flyers	2	4	-
N4	Walpole Express	1	0	-

Championship (Best-of-5)
N2	New Hampshire Junior Monarchs	4	1*	3*	-	-
S1	Philadelphia Little Flyers	1	0	2	-	-

Note: * denotes overtime period(s)
