= 2013–14 USPHL Premier season =

- League: United States Premier Hockey League; Premier
- Sport: Ice hockey
- Duration: Regular season September 2013 – February 2014; Postseason; March 2014
- Games: 48
- Teams: 9

Regular season
- Season champions: Boston Junior Bruins
- Top scorer: Dominic Trento (New Jersey Hitmen)

Dineen Cup Playoffs
- Finals champions: Boston Junior Bruins
- Runners-up: New Jersey Hitmen

USPHL Premier seasons
- 2014–15 →

The 2013–14 USPHL Premier season was the inaugural season of the Premier Division of the United States Premier Hockey League (USPHL). The regular season ran from September 2013 to February 2014 with an 50-game schedule. The Boston Junior Bruins won the regular season championship and went on to defeat the New Jersey Hitmen 2 games to 0 for the Dineen Cup.

== League formation ==
In 2013, six teams from the Eastern Junior Hockey League (Bay State Breakers, Boston Junior Bruins, Islanders Hockey Club, New Jersey Hitmen, Portland Jr. Pirates and South Shore Kings) withdrew from the league to form a new league of their own. Though initially the United States Premier Hockey League was not going to receive sanctioning from USA Hockey, the USPHL did eventually get approval before the start of the season. At the time of its founding, the USPHL made the Premier Division the top level of play and enticed three additional programs to join. The Connecticut Yankees independent junior team agreed to join the league. Additionally, the P.A.L. Jr. Islanders organization founded a junior team and joined the new league, while the Philadelphia Jr. Flyers, who had their primary junior team signed up to play in the new Eastern Hockey League, founded a secondary junior team for the USPHL. Many other junior teams also joined the USPHL at this time but they took their place in one of the lower leagues (Elite, Empire, or U18).

== Regular season ==
The standings at the end of the regular season were as follows:

Note: y = clinched division title; z = clinched regular season title

=== Standings ===
Team	GP	W	L	OTL	Pts	GF	GA
yz – Boston Junior Bruins	48	36	8	4	76	184	103
y – New Jersey Hitmen	48	36	11	1	73	209	106
y – South Shore Kings	48	31	13	4	66	166	139
y – Philadelphia Jr. Flyers	48	28	17	3	59	176	157
y – Islanders Hockey Club	48	23	21	4	50	159	157
y – P.A.L. Jr. Islanders	48	22	21	5	49	134	147
y – Bay State Breakers	48	18	23	7	43	132	161
y – Portland Jr. Pirates	48	14	30	4	32	97	186
Connecticut Yankees	48	8	39	1	17	120	237

== Dineen Cup playoffs ==
=== Divisional Round ===
Teams are reseeded after the preliminary and quarterfinal rounds.

Quarterfinals (Best-of-3)
1	Boston Junior Bruins	3	7	-
8	Portland Jr. Pirates	1	0	-
2	New Jersey Hitmen	2	6	-
7	Bay State Breakers	1	3	-
3	South Shore Kings	0	4	6
6	P.A.L. Jr. Islanders	1	2	2
4	Philadelphia Jr. Flyers	4	5	1
5	Islanders Hockey Club	5	4	2

Semifinals (Best-of-3)
1	Boston Junior Bruins	6	4	-
5	Islanders Hockey Club	1	2	-
2	New Jersey Hitmen	5	7	-
3	South Shore Kings	1	1	-

Championship (Best-of-3)
1	Boston Junior Bruins	4	5	-
2	New Jersey Hitmen	3	4	-

Note: * denotes overtime period(s)
