= Erik Burgdoerfer =

American ice hockey player (born 1988)

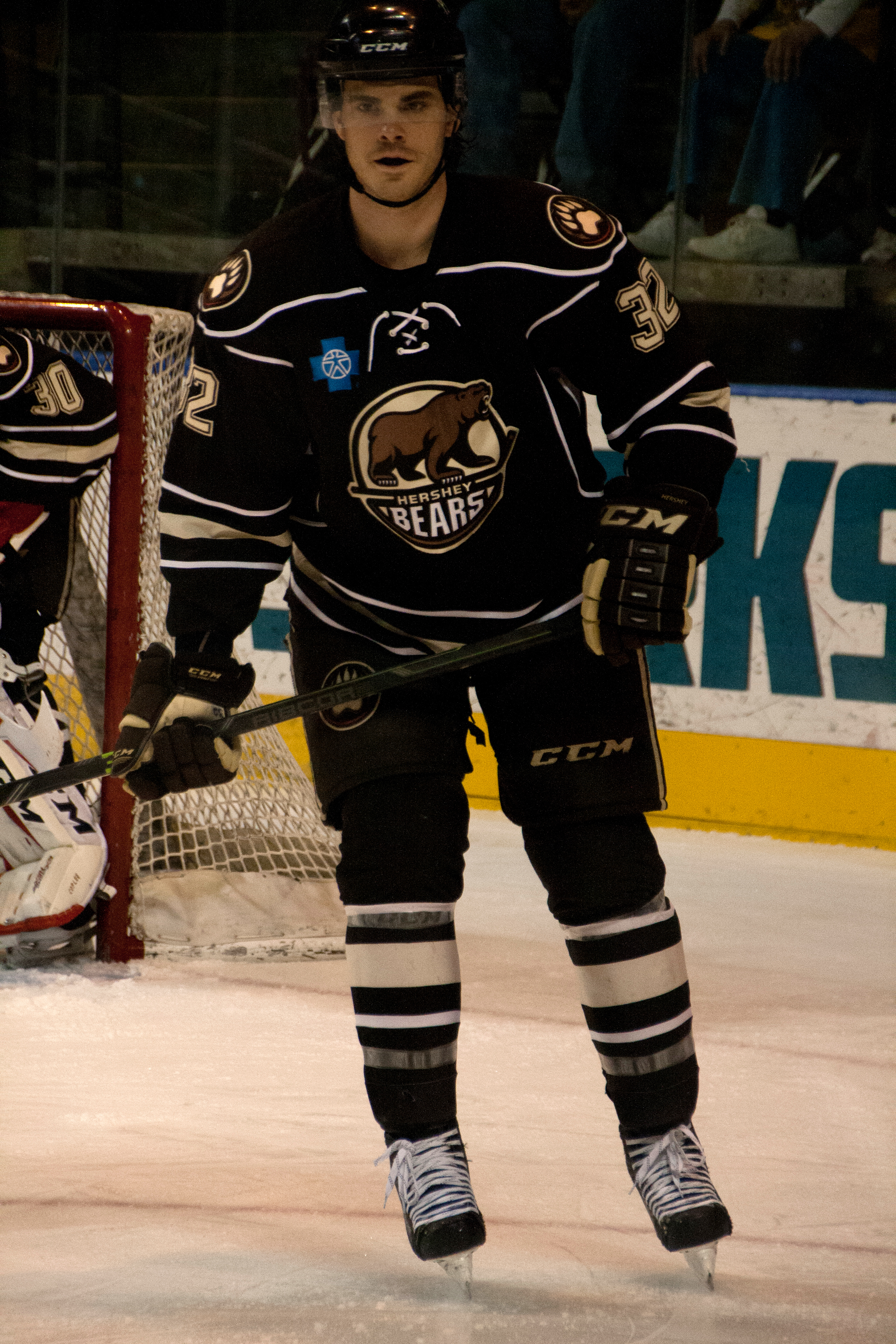
- Burgdoerfer with the Hershey Bears in 2015
- Born: December 11, 1988 (age 37) East Setauket, New York, U.S.
- Height: 6 ft 1 in (185 cm)
- Weight: 210 lb (95 kg; 15 st 0 lb)
- Position: Defence
- Shot: Right
- Played for: Buffalo Sabres; Ottawa Senators
- NHL draft: Undrafted
- Playing career: 2010–2020

Erik Lawrence Burgdoerfer (born December 11, 1988) is an American former professional ice hockey defenceman. He played in the National Hockey League (NHL) with the Buffalo Sabres and the Ottawa Senators.

== Playing career ==
Burgdoerfer attended Ward Melville High School for four years while playing for the New York Apple Core in the Eastern Hockey League. While playing for the New York Apple Core, he was named to the All-EJHL Team.

=== Collegiate ===
Burgdoerfer played college hockey for Rensselaer Polytechnic Institute of ECAC Hockey.

In his freshman year at Rensselaer Polytechnic Institute, he played in 23 games and recorded 2 points. He shared the honor of winning the Engineers Most Improved Player Award with Andrei Uryadov.

In his senior year, the 2009–10 season, Burgdoerfer played in a career high 39 games and scored seven points. In January 2009, Burgdoerfer was suspended for three games due to harmful hits but at the conclusion of the season, Burgdoerfer was named to the ECAC Hockey All-Academic team, and was awarded the Engineers Best Defensive Player Award.

=== Professional ===
Following his graduation, Burgdoerfer began his professional career in 2010 with the Bakersfield Condors of the ECHL. In January 2013, Burgdoerfer was named captain of the Condors.

In October 2013, Burgdoerfer was signed by the American Hockey League's Oklahoma City Barons.

Burgdoerfer was signed to a one-year contract by the AHL's Hershey Bears in August 2014. The team re-signed him to a second one-year contract in May 2015.

After two successful seasons in the AHL with the Bears, Burgdoerfer secured his first NHL contract in signing a one-year, two-way deal with the Buffalo Sabres on July 21, 2016. After beginning the 2016–17 season with the Rochester Americans of the AHL, he was called up to Buffalo after a rash of injuries on the blueline and made his NHL debut on December 5, 2016, in a game against the Washington Capitals.

On July 1, 2017, the first day of NHL free agency, Burgdoerfer signed a two-year, $1.3 million contract with the Ottawa Senators. Burgdoerfer was called up to the NHL on February 26, 2018, and he recorded his first NHL point on March 13, 2018, in a 7–4 win over the Tampa Bay Lightning.

Prior to the 2018–19 season, Burgdoerfer was named the second captain in Belleville Senators history. After playing in 10 games, Burgdoerfer was recalled to the NHL on November 1. He was re-assigned to the AHL on November 9 after playing in one game. Due to an injury to Mark Borowiecki, Burgdoerfer was recalled to the NHL on December 1 after playing in 16 games and scoring six points. He was re-assigned to the AHL after playing in three games and recording no points.

After two seasons within the Senators organization, Burgdoerfer left as a free agent and later returned to former club, the Hershey Bears, on a one-year AHL contract on July 11, 2019.

== Personal life ==
Burgdoerfer's twin brother Greg also plays hockey. He last played for the Bakersfield Condors.

== Career statistics ==
			Regular season					Playoffs
Season	Team	League	GP	G	A	Pts	PIM	GP	G	A	Pts	PIM
2005–06	New York Apple Core	EJHL	45	6	10	16	60	—	—	—	—	—
2006–07	R.P.I.	ECAC	23	1	1	2	32	—	—	—	—	—
2007–08	R.P.I.	ECAC	32	2	3	5	47	—	—	—	—	—
2008–09	R.P.I.	ECAC	35	3	2	5	106	—	—	—	—	—
2009–10	R.P.I.	ECAC	39	1	6	7	51	—	—	—	—	—
2009–10	Bakersfield Condors	ECHL	3	0	0	0	10	—	—	—	—	—
2010–11	Bakersfield Condors	ECHL	68	2	14	16	50	4	1	0	1	2
2011–12	Bakersfield Condors	ECHL	60	5	11	16	91	—	—	—	—	—
2012–13	Bakersfield Condors	ECHL	71	4	17	21	67	—	—	—	—	—
2013–14	Bakersfield Condors	ECHL	67	11	11	22	70	16	1	5	6	18
2013–14	Oklahoma City Barons	AHL	3	0	1	1	4	—	—	—	—	—
2014–15	South Carolina Stingrays	ECHL	3	0	0	0	2	—	—	—	—	—
2014–15	Hershey Bears	AHL	58	1	6	7	58	10	0	1	1	2
2015–16	Hershey Bears	AHL	74	6	14	20	59	21	0	4	4	18
2016–17	Rochester Americans	AHL	52	1	16	17	44	—	—	—	—	—
2016–17	Buffalo Sabres	NHL	2	0	0	0	0	—	—	—	—	—
2017–18	Belleville Senators	AHL	66	5	12	17	57	—	—	—	—	—
2017–18	Ottawa Senators	NHL	2	0	1	1	0	—	—	—	—	—
2018–19	Belleville Senators	AHL	64	5	13	18	44	—	—	—	—	—
2018–19	Ottawa Senators	NHL	4	0	0	0	2	—	—	—	—	—
2019–20	Hershey Bears	AHL	54	2	7	9	63	—	—	—	—	—
NHL totals			8	0	1	1	2	—	—	—	—	—

== Awards and honors ==
Award	Year	Ref
College
All-Academic Team	2010	
Engineers Best Defensive Player Award	2010	
ECHL
ECHL All-Star Game	2011	
