= 2016–17 USPHL Premier season =

- League: United States Premier Hockey League; Premier
- Sport: Ice hockey
- Duration: Regular season September 2016 – February 2017; Postseason; March 2017
- Games: 45
- Teams: 10

Regular season
- Season champions: Islanders Hockey Club
- Top scorer: Austin Lemieux (Islanders Hockey Club)

Dineen Cup Playoffs
- Finals champions: Islanders Hockey Club
- Runners-up: Boston Junior Bruins

USPHL Premier seasons
- ← 2015–16 2017–18 →

The 2016–17 USPHL Premier season was the 4th season of the Premier Division of the United States Premier Hockey League (USPHL) and last as the league's primary level. This is the final year that the USPHL operated under sanctioning from USA Hockey. The regular season ran from September 2016 to February 2017 with an unbalanced schedule. The Islanders Hockey Club won the regular season championship and went on to defeat the Boston Junior Bruins 2 games to 0 for the Dineen Cup.

== Member changes ==
- Prior to the start of the season, both the Portland Jr. Pirates and Rochester Jr. Americans were both removed from the league.

== Regular season ==
The standings at the end of the regular season were as follows:

Note: z = clinched regular season title

=== Standings ===
Team	GP	W	L	OTL	Pts	GF	GA
z – Islanders Hockey Club	45	38	6	1	77	209	100
New Jersey Hitmen	45	32	9	4	68	200	102
Boston Junior Bruins	45	33	12	0	66	170	102
Syracuse Stars	45	26	14	5	57	179	152
Connecticut Jr. Rangers	45	19	20	6	44	133	142
South Shore Kings	45	20	22	3	43	144	148
Springfield Pics	45	19	22	4	42	138	174
Philadelphia Jr. Flyers	45	17	22	6	40	131	175
P.A.L. Jr. Islanders	45	17	26	2	36	124	174
Okanagan Eagles	45	4	39	2	10	67	226

== Dineen Cup playoffs ==
=== Divisional Round ===
Teams are reseeded after the preliminary and quarterfinal rounds.

Preliminary (Best-of-1)
7	Springfield Pics	7
10	Okanagan Eagles	1
8	Philadelphia Jr. Flyers	1
9	P.A.L. Jr. Islanders	3

Quarterfinals (Best-of-3)
1	Islanders Hockey Club	2
9	P.A.L. Jr. Islanders	0
2	New Jersey Hitmen	0
7	Springfield Pics	2
3	Boston Junior Bruins	2
6	South Shore Kings	0
4	Syracuse Stars	2
5	Connecticut Jr. Rangers	1

Semifinals (Best-of-3)
1	Islanders Hockey Club	2
7	Springfield Pics	0
3	Boston Junior Bruins	2
4	Syracuse Stars	1

Championship (Best-of-3)
1	Islanders Hockey Club	2
4	Boston Junior Bruins	0

Note: * denotes overtime period(s)
