= Ryan Donato =

American ice hockey player (born 1996)

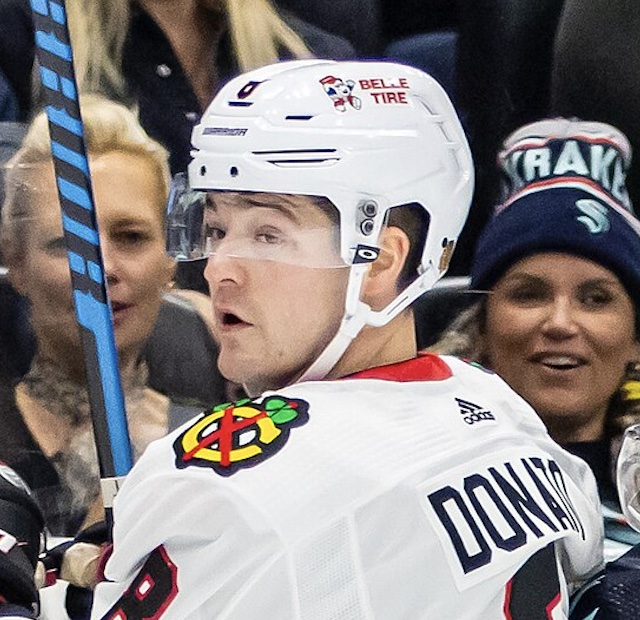
- Donato with the Chicago Blackhawks in 2023.
- Born: April 9, 1996 (age 30) Scituate, Massachusetts, U.S.
- Height: 6 ft 0 in (183 cm)
- Weight: 190 lb (86 kg; 13 st 8 lb)
- Position: Forward
- Shoots: Left
- NHL team Former teams: Chicago Blackhawks; Boston Bruins; Minnesota Wild; San Jose Sharks; Seattle Kraken
- National team: United States
- NHL draft: 56th overall, 2014; Boston Bruins
- Playing career: 2018–present

Ryan Donato (born April 9, 1996) is an American professional ice hockey player who is a forward for the Chicago Blackhawks of the National Hockey League (NHL). He was selected by the Boston Bruins in the second round, 56th overall, in the 2014 NHL entry draft. He has previously played for the Boston Bruins, Minnesota Wild, San Jose Sharks, and Seattle Kraken. On October 12, 2021, Donato scored the first goal in Kraken franchise history in a 4–3 loss against the Vegas Golden Knights.

== Playing career ==
=== Early career ===
Donato played high school hockey with Dexter Southfield in Massachusetts. He was selected in the second round, 56th overall, by the Boston Bruins in the 2014 NHL entry draft.

Continuing to play with Dexter, Donato made his junior debut with the South Shore Kings in the United States Premier Hockey League before finishing with the Omaha Lancers of the United States Hockey League, having committed to a collegiate career with Harvard University, in following his father's footsteps who was now the Crimson's head coach.

=== Professional ===
==== Boston Bruins ====
Having led the Crimson as a junior in scoring through the 2017–18 season with 26 goals and 17 assists for 43 points in just 29 games, Donato opted to leave the college early and turn professional. He signed a three-year, entry-level contract with the Bruins on March 18, 2018. Despite leaving college hockey, Donato was still enrolled in Harvard classes and was aiming to finish the semester while playing in the NHL. He made his NHL debut the next day where he recorded his first NHL goal and added two assists in a 5–4 overtime loss to the Columbus Blue Jackets. Donato made his playoff debut during Game 2 of the 2018 Stanley Cup playoffs in a 7–3 win over the Toronto Maple Leafs.

Donato began the 2018–19 season with the Bruins. On November 1, he was assigned to the Bruins' American Hockey League (AHL) affiliate, the Providence Bruins after playing in 11 games. He was recalled by Boston on November 28 after recording nine points in 10 games for Providence. Donato was reassigned to Providence on January 28, 2019.

==== Minnesota Wild ====
On February 20, 2019, Donato and a 2019 conditional fifth-round pick were traded to the Minnesota Wild in exchange for Charlie Coyle. He made his debut for the Wild on February 21, recording two assists in a 4–1 win over the New York Rangers.

On July 16, 2019, the Wild re-signed Donato to a two-year, $3.8 million contract extension.

==== San Jose Sharks ====
On October 5, 2020, Donato was traded by the Wild to the San Jose Sharks in exchange for Pittsburgh's 2021 third-round pick. His debut came on January 14, 2021, in a 4–3 shootout win over the Arizona Coyotes.

==== Seattle Kraken ====
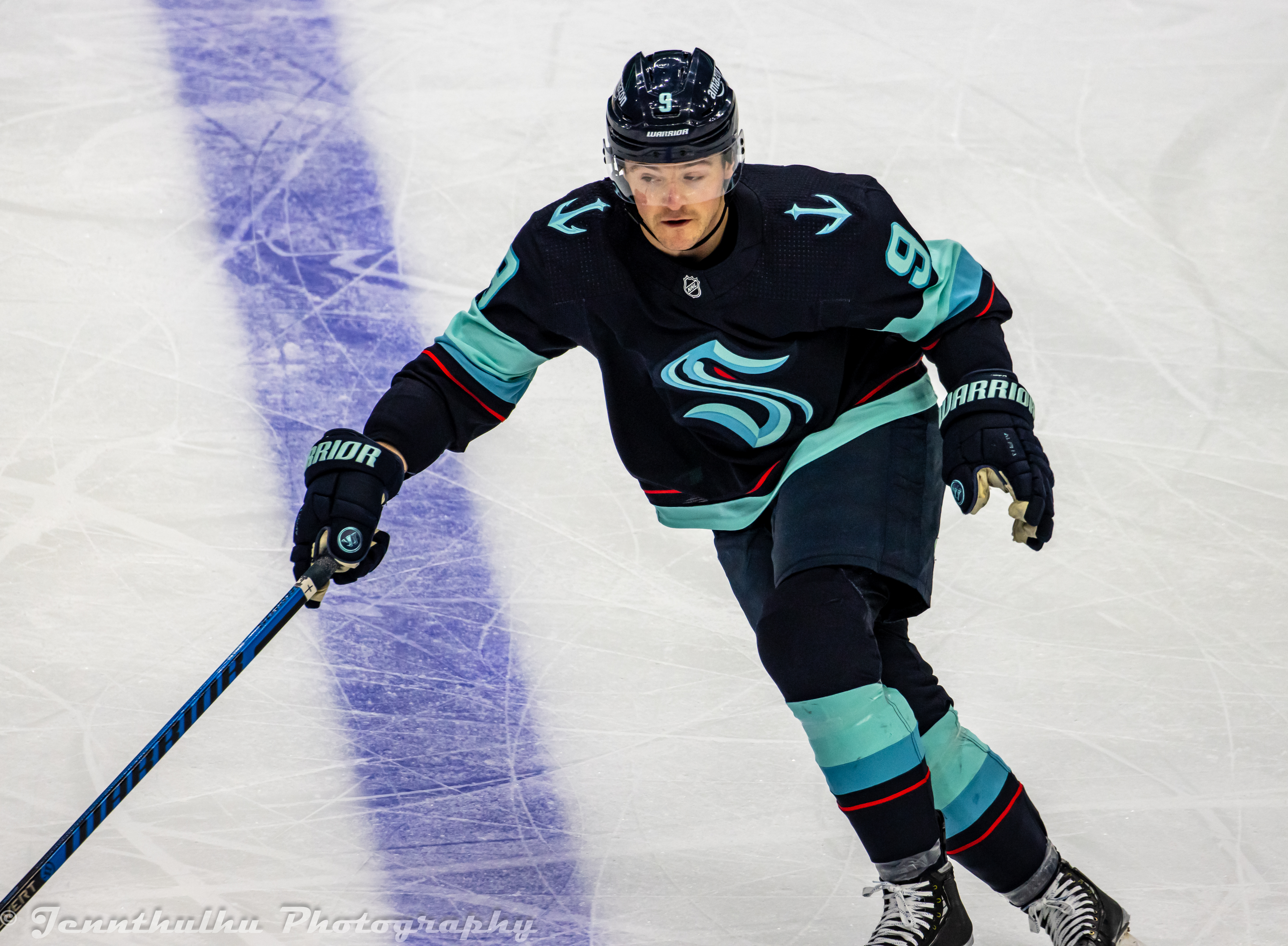
Donato with the Seattle Kraken in 2023.

On September 12, 2021, the expansion team Seattle Kraken signed Donato as a free agent to a one-year, $750,000 contract for the 2021–22 season.

Donato scored the opening goal in the franchise's first preseason game against the Vancouver Canucks on September 26, 2021. He followed that up with the first official goal in Seattle Kraken franchise history, scoring on opening night in a 4–3 loss to the Vegas Golden Knights on October 12, 2021. Donato scored a career-high 16 goals and added 15 assists for 31 points in 74 games, as Seattle missed the playoffs in their inaugural season.

As an impending restricted free agent, Donato was not tendered a qualifying offer by the Kraken and was released as a free agent. On July 27, 2022, after testing the market he was re-signed by the Kraken to a one-year, $1.2 million contract. In the 2022–23 season, Donato built upon his first season with the Kraken by continuing to contribute in various forward roles in posting 13 goals and 27 points through 71 regular season games. In helping the Kraken qualify for the post-season, he added 2 assists through 14 games.

==== Chicago Blackhawks ====
After two seasons with the Kraken, Donato left the club as a free agent and was signed on the opening day of free agency to a two-year, $4 million contract with the rebuilding Chicago Blackhawks on July 1, 2023. On March 28, 2025, Donato scored his first career hat-trick in a 5–3 loss to the Vegas Golden Knights.

On June 18, 2025, Donato signed a four-year, $16 million contract extension with the Blackhawks.

== International play ==
Medal record

Representing United States

Ice hockey

World Championships
Bronze medal – third place	2021 Latvia	

World Junior Championships
Bronze medal – third place	2016 Finland	

Donato made his first appearance at the international level as a junior when he was selected by the United States to participate in the 2016 World Junior Championships. He finished the tournament with 3 goals and 4 points in 7 games, resulting in a bronze medal.

Donato was selected for the United States men's national ice hockey team, to compete in the men's tournament at the 2018 Winter Olympics. Donato led the United States in scoring, with six points; additionally, his five goals place him in a tie for the most goals scored – alongside Ilya Kovalchuk and Kirill Kaprizov. However, the team's overall performance was a disappointment as team USA skated to a seventh-place finish.

== Personal life ==
Donato is the son of former Bruin and longtime NHL player Ted Donato, a former player for the Boston Bruins and the current head coach of the Harvard Crimson. On July 30, 2023, Donato married his wife Bradley Donato.

== Career statistics ==
=== Regular season and playoffs ===
			Regular season					Playoffs
Season	Team	League	GP	G	A	Pts	PIM	GP	G	A	Pts	PIM
2011–12	Dexter School	USHS	26	14	22	36	8	—	—	—	—	—
2012–13	Dexter School	USHS	28	29	31	60	14	—	—	—	—	—
2013–14	Dexter School	USHS	30	37	41	78	16	—	—	—	—	—
2014–15	Dexter School	USHS	31	18	35	53	16	—	—	—	—	—
2014–15	South Shore Kings	USPHL	13	5	5	10	4	—	—	—	—	—
2014–15	Omaha Lancers	USHL	8	5	5	10	4	3	1	0	1	15
2015–16	Harvard University	ECAC	32	13	8	21	26	—	—	—	—	—
2016–17	Harvard University	ECAC	36	21	19	40	25	—	—	—	—	—
2017–18	Harvard University	ECAC	29	26	17	43	10	—	—	—	—	—
2017–18	Boston Bruins	NHL	12	5	4	9	2	3	0	0	0	0
2018–19	Boston Bruins	NHL	34	6	3	9	2	—	—	—	—	—
2018–19	Providence Bruins	AHL	18	7	5	12	7	—	—	—	—	—
2018–19	Minnesota Wild	NHL	22	4	12	16	4	—	—	—	—	—
2018–19	Iowa Wild	AHL	3	2	3	5	4	11	2	4	6	4
2019–20	Minnesota Wild	NHL	62	14	9	23	12	2	0	0	0	2
2020–21	San Jose Sharks	NHL	50	6	14	20	10	—	—	—	—	—
2021–22	Seattle Kraken	NHL	74	16	15	31	40	—	—	—	—	—
2022–23	Seattle Kraken	NHL	71	14	13	27	46	14	0	2	2	12
2023–24	Chicago Blackhawks	NHL	78	12	18	30	26	—	—	—	—	—
2024–25	Chicago Blackhawks	NHL	80	31	31	62	41	—	—	—	—	—
2025–26	Chicago Blackhawks	NHL	82	15	15	30	46	—	—	—	—	—
NHL totals			565	123	134	257	229	19	0	2	2	14

=== International ===
Year	Team	Event	Result	GP	G	A	Pts	PIM
2016	United States	WJC	3rd place, bronze medalist(s)	7	3	1	4	2
2018	United States	OG	7th	5	5	1	6	2
2021	United States	WC	3rd place, bronze medalist(s)	10	1	3	4	6
Junior totals				7	3	1	4	2
Senior totals				15	6	4	10	8

== Awards and honors ==
Award	Year
USHL
All-USA Hockey First Team	2015
College
ECAC All-Tournament Team	2017
All-ECAC Hockey Second Team	2017
All-Ivy League First Team	2017
Ivy-League Players of the Year	2017
AHCA East First-Team All-American	2018
Hobey Baker Award (Finalist)	2017–18
ECAC Hockey Player of the Year	2017–18

Awards and achievements
Preceded by Mike Vecchione	ECAC Hockey Player of the Year; 2017–18	Succeeded by Adam Fox
