= 2015–16 USPHL Premier season =

- League: United States Premier Hockey League; Premier
- Sport: Ice hockey
- Duration: Regular season September 2015 – February 2016; Postseason; March 2016
- Games: 44
- Teams: 12

Regular season
- Season champions: Islanders Hockey Club
- Top scorer: Billy Vizzo (Islanders Hockey Club)

Dineen Cup Playoffs
- Finals champions: New Jersey Hitmen
- Runners-up: Islanders Hockey Club

USPHL Premier seasons
- ← 2014–15 2016–17 →

The 2015–16 USPHL Premier season was the 3rd season of the Premier Division of the United States Premier Hockey League (USPHL). The regular season ran from September 2015 to February 2016 with an 44-game schedule. The Islanders Hockey Club won the regular season championship and went on be defeated by the New Jersey Hitmen 2 games to 0 for the Dineen Cup.

== Member changes ==
- The USPHL reached an agreement with the Okanagan Hockey Group to allow a travel team of European players into the league. The club was called the 'Okanagan European Eagles' or 'Okanagan Eagles' for short.

== Regular season ==
The standings at the end of the regular season were as follows:

Note: y = clinched division title; z = clinched regular season title

=== Standings ===
| Team | GP | W | L | OTL | Pts | GF | GA |
|---|---|---|---|---|---|---|---|
| yz – Islanders Hockey Club | 44 | 36 | 8 | 0 | 72 | 184 | 105 |
| y – New Jersey Hitmen | 44 | 34 | 9 | 1 | 69 | 206 | 123 |
| y – Boston Junior Bruins | 44 | 33 | 9 | 2 | 68 | 195 | 104 |
| y – South Shore Kings | 44 | 31 | 8 | 5 | 67 | 172 | 107 |
| y – P.A.L. Jr. Islanders | 44 | 28 | 16 | 0 | 56 | 177 | 160 |
| y – Philadelphia Jr. Flyers | 44 | 24 | 15 | 5 | 53 | 158 | 150 |
| y – Connecticut Jr. Rangers | 44 | 20 | 23 | 1 | 41 | 134 | 170 |
| y – Syracuse Stars | 44 | 18 | 22 | 4 | 40 | 129 | 155 |
| y – Rochester Jr. Americans | 44 | 13 | 28 | 3 | 29 | 128 | 183 |
| y – Portland Jr. Pirates | 44 | 12 | 28 | 4 | 28 | 126 | 168 |
| Springfield Pics | 44 | 11 | 30 | 3 | 25 | 123 | 187 |
| Okanagan Eagles | 44 | 4 | 36 | 4 | 12 | 67 | 185 |

== Dineen Cup playoffs ==
=== Divisional Round ===
Teams are reseeded after the preliminary and quarterfinal rounds.

Preliminary (Best-of-1)
7 | Connecticut Jr. Rangers | 3
10 | Portland Jr. Pirates | 1
8 | Syracuse Stars | 1
9 | Rochester Jr. Americans | 3

Quarterfinals (Best-of-3)
1 | Islanders Hockey Club | 3 | 4 | -
9 | Rochester Jr. Americans | 0 | 1 | -
2 | New Jersey Hitmen | 3 | 5 | 4
7 | Connecticut Jr. Rangers | 5 | 2 | 2
3 | Boston Junior Bruins | 3* | 4 | -
6 | Philadelphia Jr. Flyers | 2 | 1 | -
4 | South Shore Kings | 6* | 5 | -
5 | P.A.L. Jr. Islanders | 5 | 1 | -

Semifinals (Best-of-3)
1 | Islanders Hockey Club | 3* | 3 | -
4 | South Shore Kings | 2 | 2 | -
2 | New Jersey Hitmen | 7 | 2 | -
3 | Boston Junior Bruins | 5 | 0 | -

Championship (Best-of-3)
1 | Islanders Hockey Club | 0 | 2 | -
2 | New Jersey Hitmen | 3 | 5 | -

Note: * denotes overtime period(s)
