= Connecticut RoughRiders =

- City: Norwalk, Connecticut
- League: Eastern Hockey League
- Division: Colonial
- Founded: 2013
- Home arena: SoNo Ice House
- Colors: Black, green and white
- General manager: James Henry
- Head coach: Tomasz Piatek

Franchise history
- 2012–Present: Connecticut RoughRiders

Championships
- Division titles: 2018
- Playoff championships: 2013

The Connecticut RoughRiders are a Tier II junior ice hockey team playing in the Eastern Hockey League. The RoughRiders play their home games at the SoNo Ice House in Norwalk, Connecticut.

== History ==
In 2017, the Superior RoughRiders, members of the Western States Hockey League, founded a Tier III affiliate program and reached an agreement to begin playing at the SoNo Ice House this season. At that time the Connecticut Oilers, an existing Eastern Hockey League team, also played at that venue but quickly chose to relocate to Hamden, Connecticut. Since then, the Connecticut RoughRiders have operated in the EHL through the league's withdrawal from USA Hockey oversight and promotion to Tier II status.

== Season-by-season records ==
Season	GP	W	L	T	OTL	Pts	GF	GA	Regular season finish	Playoffs
2017–18	50	31	18	—	1	63	206	139	1st of 4, Central Div. 3rd of 8, South Conf. 6th of 16, EHL	Lost Conf. Quarterfinal series, 0–2 (Philadelphia Little Flyers)
2018–19	45	22	16	—	7	51	171	169	3rd of 5, South Div. 6th of 10, New England Conf. 10th of 18, EHL	Lost Conf. Quarterfinal series, 0–2 (Vermont Lumberjacks)
2019–20	46	28	14	—	4	60	191	165	3rd of 8, Mid-Atlantic Conf. 8th of 19, EHL	Lost Conf. Quarterfinal series, 1–2 (Philadelphia Jr. Flyers)
2020–21	37	14	19	—	4	32	127	176	5th of 6, South Div. t-14th of 17, EHL	Lost Div. Quarterfinal series, 0–2 (Team Maryland)
2021–22	46	14	26	—	6	34	139	240	3rd of 4, Central Div. 16th of 17, EHL	Lost Div. Semifinal series, 0–2 (Connecticut Chiefs)
2022–23	46	13	28	2	3	31	125	182	t-4th of 5, Central Div. t-18th of 19, EHL	Won Div. Qualifier, 6–5 (New York Apple Core); Lost Div. Semifinal series, 0–2 (Worcester Jr. Railers)
2023–24	46	11	32	3	0	25	120	216	6th of 6, Central Div. 23th of 23, EHL	Did not qualify
2024–25	46	14	32	1	0	29	121	221	4th of 5, Central Div. 18th of 21, EHL	Lost Div. Semifinal series, 0–2 Providence Capitals
2025–26	24	3	19	1	1	24	49	164	5th of 5, Central Div. 16th of 17, EHL	Did not qualify
National Collegiate Development Conference
