= Hershey Cubs =

- City: Hershey, Pennsylvania
- League: Eastern Amateur Hockey League
- Operated: 1938–1939
- Home arena: Hershey Sports Arena
- Colors: Brown, white

The Hershey Cubs were a minor professional ice hockey team based in Hershey, Pennsylvania. The team played at the Hershey Sports Arena and dissolved after one season.

== History ==
The Hershey Bears had been members of the Eastern Amateur Hockey League since its inception. In 1938, after winning three consecutive league championships, Hershey was invited to join the newly created International-American Hockey League. When the Bears left, they did not completely abandon their old conference and Hershey Estates, the team's owners, founded a second team they called the 'Hershey Cubs'. The Cubs finished last in the 4-team conference and then withdrew from the league after the season.

== Season-by-season record ==
Note: GP = Games played, W = Wins, L = Losses, T = Ties, Pts = Points, GF = Goals for, GA = Goals against

Season	GP	W	L	T	Pts	GF	GA	Finish	Coach	Playoffs
1938–39	53	19	29	5	43	161	192	4th	Lloyd Blinco	none
