= New Jersey Titans (EHL) =

- City: Middletown Township, New Jersey
- League: Eastern Hockey League
- Founded: 2003
- Folded: 2015
- Home arena: Middletown Ice World Arena
- Colors: Red, black and white

Franchise history
- 2003–2004: New Jersey Junior Titans
- 2012–2015: New Jersey Titans

The New Jersey Titans were a Tier III junior ice hockey team in the Eastern Hockey League. Based in Middletown Township, New Jersey, the Titans played home games at the Middletown Ice World.

== History ==
The New Jersey Titans were founded as a youth ice hockey organization in 1999. In 2003, the club founded a junior-age franchise (16-20 years old) and became founding members of the Atlantic Junior Hockey League. After just one season, the team withdrew from the league. Eight years later, the Titans rejoined the AJHL. Just one year later, the Titans remained with the league during a large reshuffling of junior hockey clubs which included the AJHL rebranding as the Eastern Hockey League.

In 2015, the organization purchased the Tier II junior franchise rights from the Soo Eagles. The Titans then dissolved their Tier III club and transferred all personnel to the North American Hockey League club.

== Season-by-season records ==
Season	GP	W	L	T	OTL	PTS	GF	GA	Finish	Playoffs
Atlantic Junior Hockey League
2003–04	29	11	17	–	1	23	88	121	4th of 6, AJHL	Lost Quarterfinal, 3–5 (Philadelphia Little Flyers)
2004–2012	not active									
2012–13	44	14	27	3	0	31	115	166	10th of 12, AJHL	Did not qualify
Eastern Hockey League
2013–14	44	10	28	3	3	26	115	168	5th of 6, South Div. 16th of 17, EHL	Won Play-in, 8–2 (Washington Junior Nationals); Lost First Round series, 0–2 (New Hampshire Junior Monarchs)
2014–15	44	9	28	3	4	25	92	185	4th of 5, South Div. 18th of 19, EHL	Did not qualify
