= New York Apple Core =

- City: Brewster, New York
- League: EHL
- Division: Central
- Founded: 1993
- Home arena: Brewster Ice Arena
- Colors: Red, white, green, golden yellow
- Owners: Robert Santini; Steve Santini
- General manager: Josh Fusco (2025)
- Head coach: Josh Fusco (2025)

The New York Apple Core are a Tier II Junior A ice hockey team from Brewster, New York, playing in the Eastern Hockey League. The team plays home games at the Brewster Ice Arena. The Apple Core organization is based out of Long Beach, New York, on Long Island, however, their top level junior team has played in Brewster since the start of the 2011–12 season.

The Apple Core organization also fields a Tier III team in the Eastern Hockey League-Premier Division, as well as youth hockey select teams at the Bantam, Peewee, and Squirt and other various levels.

== History ==
The franchise was a full-time member of the Eastern Junior Hockey League (EJHL) from 1998 to 2013. The team was originally formed in 1993 in the Junior B Metro League. In 1997–98, they played a handful of games against the EJHL, and became a full-time member a year later. In 2003, the Apple Core won the Triple Crown EJHL Championship, finishing as regular season and post-season champions. In 2013, the various Tier III junior hockey leagues in the north east went through a re-organization, which included the Apple Core joining the Atlantic Junior Hockey League. The Atlantic Junior Hockey League then re-branded itself as the Eastern Hockey League (EHL) after the dissolution of the former EJHL.

Since joining the EJHL in 1998, the organization has also fielded multiple Tier III Junior B/C teams in the Empire Junior Hockey League, Eastern States Hockey League, and Metropolitan Junior Hockey League, and the United States Premier Hockey League - Empire Division. In 2016, their developmental team (formerly known as Tier III Junior B/C) moved from the Metropolitan Junior Hockey League to the EHL's Elite Division (and then called Premier Division since 2017) and continues to play home games in Long Beach, New York.

== Season-by-season records ==
Season	GP	W	L	T	OTL	Pts	GF	GA	Regular season finish	Playoffs
1996–97	50	38	7	5	—	81	285	185	3rd Metro A	
1997–98	No information									
Eastern Junior Hockey League
1998–99	37	25	8	4	—	54	192	109	2nd of 8, EJHL	
1999–00	39	20	15	4	—	44	155	118	7th of 11, EJHL	
2000–01	No information								3rd of 12, EJHL	Lost Quarterfinal game, 3–5 vs. Valley Jr. Warriors
2001–02	38	26	10	0	2	54	186	87	1st of 6, South; 2nd of 12, EJHL	Won Quarterfinal game, 7–0 vs. Lowell Jr. Lock Monsters; Won Semifinal game, 4–2 vs. New England Jr. Coyotes; Lost Championship game, 1–2 vs. New Hampshire Jr. Monarchs
2002–03	38	31	6	0	1	63	159	78	1st of 6, South; 1st of 12, EJHL	Won Quarterfinals vs. Boston Harbor Wolves; Won Semifinal game, 7–2 vs.New England Jr. Coyotes; Won Championship game, 5–4 vs. Walpole Stars; League champions
2003–04	38	18	17	1	2	39	140	127	3rd of 6, South; 6th of 12, EJHL	Lost Quarterfinals vs. New Hampshire Jr. Monarchs
2004–05	54	24	22	6	2	56	163	147	3rd of 7, South; 6th of 13, EJHL	Lost Quarterfinals, 1–1 vs. Valley Jr. Warriors
2005–06	45	16	19	6	4	42	125	146	6th of 7, South; 10th of 14, EJHL	did not qualify
2006–07	45	19	17	7	2	47	162	142	3rd of 7, South; 6th of 14, EJHL	Lost Quarterfinals, 1–1 vs. Boston Jr. Bruins
2007–08	45	21	19	3	2	47	173	167	5th of 7, South; 8th of 14, EJHL	Lost Play-in game vs. Bay State Breakers
2008–09	45	17	27	1	0	35	159	201	6th of 7, South; 11th of 14, EJHL	did not qualify
2009–10	45	21	18	3	3	48	172	159	4th of 7, South; 7th of 14, EJHL	Lost Quarterfinals, 0–2 vs. New Hampshire Jr. Monarchs
2010–11	45	15	22	7	1	38	162	184	5th of 7, South; 8th of 14, EJHL	Won First Round, 1–0–1 vs. New England Jr. Huskies; Lost Quarterfinals, 1–2 vs. Jersey Hitmen
2011–12	45	20	23	0	2	42	143	178	6th of 7, South; 11th of 14, EJHL	Lost First Round, 0–1–1 vs. Valley Jr. Warriors
2012–13	45	17	23	—	5	39	140	186	5th of 7, South; 12th of 14, EJHL	Lost First Round, 1–1 vs. Rochester Stars
Eastern Hockey League
2013–14	44	20	21	1	2	43	141	155	5th of 6, Central; 11th of 17, EHL	Lost First Round, 0–2 (Boston Bandits)
2014–15	44	19	22	—	3	41	135	164	5th of 5, Central; 12th of 19, EHL	Lost First Round, 0–2 (Northern Cyclones)
2015–16	41	6	31	—	4	16	71	187	9th of 9, South Conf. 18th of 18, EHL-Premier	did not qualify
2016–17	48	14	30	—	4	32	129	214	3rd of 4, Central Div. 7th of 8, South Conf. 15th of 17, EHL-Premier	Won Conf. Quarterfinal series, 2–0 (Connecticut Oilers); Lost Conf. Semifinal series, 0–2 (Philadelphia Little Flyers)
2017–18	50	23	18	—	9	55	160	157	2nd of 4, Central Div. 4th of 8, South Conf. 8th of 16, EHL	Won Conf. Quarterfinal series, 2–1 (Wilkes-Barre/Scranton Knights); Lost Conf. Semifinal series, 0–2 (Philadelphia Revolution)
2018–19	45	17	24	—	4	38	150	172	3rd of 3, North Div. 6th of 8, Mid-Atlantic Conf. 14th of 18, EHL	Lost Div. Semifinal series, 0–2 (Wilkes-Barre/Scranton Knights)
2019–20	46	13	28	—	5	31	132	203	7th of 8, Mid-Atlantic Conf. 16th of 19, EHL	did not qualify
2020–21	37	12	22	—	3	27	128	174	6th of 6, South Div. 16th of 17, EHL	Lost Div. Semifinal series, 0–2 (Protec Jr. Ducks)
2021–22	46	12	30	—	4	28	148	224	4th of 4, Central. 17th of 17, EHL	Lost Div. Semifinal series, 1–2 (Worcester Jr. Railers)
2022–23	46	14	29	2	1	31	98	167	5th of 5, Central. 19th of 19, EHL	Lost Div. Qualifier, 5–6 (Connecticut RoughRiders)
2023–24	46	34	11	0	1	59	201	116	2nd of 6, Central. 4th of 23, EHL	Won Div. Semifinal series, 2–0 (Providence Hockey Club); Lost Div. Final series, 1–2 (Worcester Jr. Railers)
2024–25	46	5	39	2	0	12	109	270	5th of 5, Central. 21st of 21, EHL	did not qualify
2025–26	50	15	29	5	1	36	146	193	4th of 5, Central. 12th of 20, EHL	Lost Div Semifinal, 0-2 (HC Rhode Island)

== Alumni ==
Apple Core has produced a number of alumni playing in higher levels of junior hockey, NCAA Division I and Division III, and ACHA college programs, and professional hockey, including:

- Anthony Bitetto - New York Rangers (NHL)
- Erik Burgdoerfer - Buffalo Sabres (NHL)
- Mark Eaton - Pittsburgh Penguins (NHL)
- Rich Hansen - Rapid City Rush (CHL)
- Mārtiņš Karsums - Dinamo Riga (KHL)
- Ryan Cruthers - Orlando Solar Bears (ECHL)
- Doug Murray - Montreal Canadiens (NHL)
- Eric Nystrom - Nashville Predators (NHL)
- Jekabs Redlihs - Dinamo Riga (KHL)
- Steven Santini - St. Louis Blues (NHL)
- Kevin Schaeffer - Charlotte Checkers (ECHL)
- Rob Scuderi - Pittsburgh Penguins (NHL)
- Ryan Vesce - San Jose Sharks (NHL)
- Matt Gilroy - New York Rangers (NHL)

In 2005, the Apple Core became the first junior team to be represented by all four competing schools in the Beanpot hockey tournament. Representing the Apple Core were Kevin Schaeffer and Jekabs Redlihs of Boston University, Mike Brennan of Boston College, Jon Pelle and Bill Keenan of Harvard University, and Louie Liotti and Steve Birnstill of Northeastern University.
