= Eric Knodel =

American ice hockey player (born 1990)

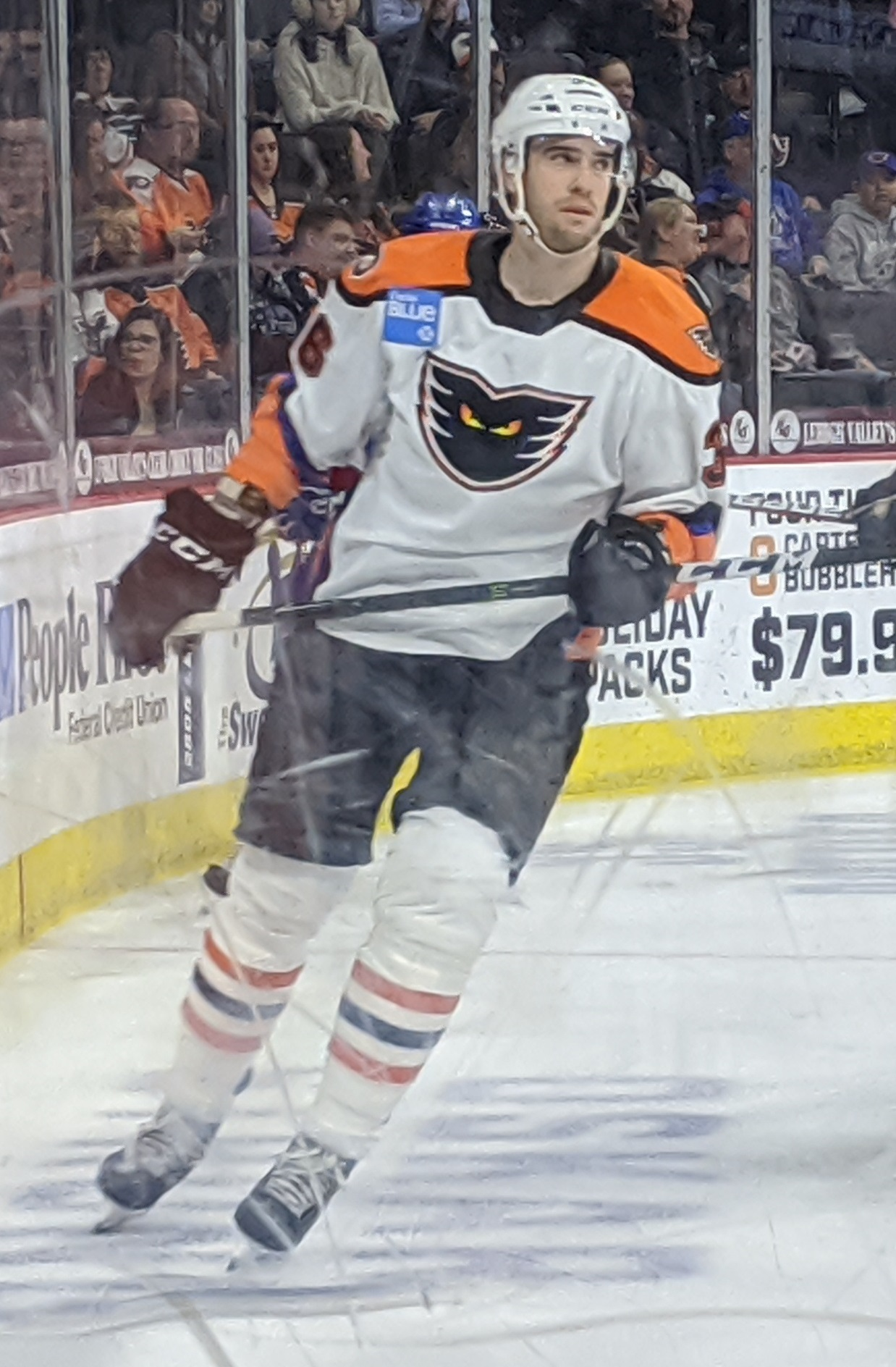
- Knodel with Lehigh Valley in 2020.
- Born: June 8, 1990 (age 36) West Chester, Pennsylvania, U.S.A.
- Height: 6 ft 6 in (198 cm)
- Weight: 216 lb (98 kg; 15 st 6 lb)
- Position: Defense
- Shot: Left
- Played for: Toronto Marlies; San Diego Gulls; Rochester Americans; Lehigh Valley Phantoms
- NHL draft: 128th overall, 2009; Toronto Maple Leafs
- Playing career: 2014–2020

Eric Knodel (born June 8, 1990) is an American former professional ice hockey player. He was drafted by the Toronto Maple Leafs in the fifth round (128th overall) of the 2009 NHL entry draft.

== Career statistics ==
			Regular season					Playoffs
Season	Team	League	GP	G	A	Pts	PIM	GP	G	A	Pts	PIM
2007–08	Philadelphia Junior Flyers	18U AAA	51	16	23	39	36	—	—	—	—	—
2008–09	Philadelphia Junior Flyers	18U AAA	51	13	32	45	30	—	—	—	—	—
2009–10	Des Moines Buccaneers	USHL	50	3	17	20	37	—	—	—	—	—
2011–12	University of New Hampshire	H-East	37	3	9	12	24	—	—	—	—	—
2012–13	University of New Hampshire	H-East	38	10	11	21	8	—	—	—	—	—
2013–14	University of New Hampshire	H-East	41	7	21	28	28	—	—	—	—	—
2013–14	Toronto Marlies	AHL	10	0	2	2	2	1	0	0	0	0
2014–15	Toronto Marlies	AHL	19	0	8	8	6	—	—	—	—	—
2014–15	Orlando Solar Bears	ECHL	38	5	14	19	10	3	0	1	1	0
2015–16	San Diego Gulls	AHL	4	0	0	0	0	—	—	—	—	—
2015–16	Utah Grizzlies	ECHL	56	7	15	22	16	10	1	3	4	2
2016–17	Cincinnati Cyclones	ECHL	58	8	20	28	30	—	—	—	—	—
2017–18	Cincinnati Cyclones	ECHL	57	13	39	52	16	5	0	5	5	2
2017–18	Rochester Americans	AHL	6	0	0	0	2	—	—	—	—	—
2018–19	Cincinnati Cyclones	ECHL	70	17	36	53	34	11	1	6	7	4
2019–20	Reading Royals	ECHL	44	7	32	39	16	—	—	—	—	—
2019–20	Lehigh Valley Phantoms	AHL	10	0	4	4	0	—	—	—	—	—
AHL totals			49	0	14	14	10	1	0	0	0	0

== Awards and honors ==
Award	Year
Hockey East
Second All-Star Team	2014
ECHL
ECHL All-Star Game	2017
Defenseman of the Year	2019
First All-Star Team	2019
Second All-Star Team	2018, 2020
