= Hershey Cubs (USPHL) =

- City: Hershey, Pennsylvania
- League: United States Premier Hockey League; Premier Division 2021-2026 Eastern Hockey League 2026-Present
- Founded: 2021
- Home arena: Hersheypark Arena
- Colors: Cream and brown
- Owner: Bruce Boudreau
- General manager: Pierre-Luc Racette
- Head coach: Brady Boudreau

Franchise history
- 2021–present: Hershey Cubs

The Hershey Cubs, are a Tier III junior ice hockey team playing in the Eastern Hockey League. Previously the team played in the United States Premier Hockey League's (USPHL) Premier Division. The Cubs play their home games at the Hersheypark Arena in Hershey, Pennsylvania.

== History ==
In January 2021, Bruce Boudreau, a former head coach in the National Hockey League and the owner of the Minnesota Blue Ox, purchased a new USPHL franchise. The new team was later named as the Hershey Cubs, in reference to the Hershey Bears, one of Boudreau former teams. The new logo was similar in appearance to that used by the Minnesota Fighting Saints, including a halo above the head of the anthropomorphic bear.The team has a mascot named Cubby

For the 2026-2027 season the team moved to the Eastern Hockey League

== Season-by-season records ==
Season	GP	W	L	OTL	Pts	GF	GA	Regular season finish	Playoffs
2021–22	44	11	30	3	25	104	193	3rd of 5, Atlantic West Div. 54th of 64, USPHL Premier	Lost Div. Semifinal series, 1–2 (Utica Jr. Comets)
2022–23	44	14	29	1	29	148	226	6th of 10, Mid-Atlantic Div. 54th of 70, USPHL Premier	Lost Div. Quarterfinal series, 0–2 (Utica Jr. Comets)
2023–24	44	26	15	3	55	189	166	3rd of 8, Atlantic Div. 25th of 61, USPHL Premier	Lost Div. Quarterfinal series, 0–2 (Rockets Hockey Club)
2024–25	44	14	27	3	31	106	168	10th of 11, Atlantic Div. 55th of 73, USPHL Premier	Did not qualify
2025–26	44	13	28	3	29	119	170	8th of 10, Atlantic Div. 57th of 77, USPHL Premier	Lost Div. Quarterfinal series, 0–2 (West Chester Wolves)
Move to EASTERN HOCKEY LEAGUE (EHL)
2026–27 EHL	-	-	-	-	-	-	-	??th of 6, South Div. ??th of 17, EHL	- -
