= HC Rhode Island =

- City: Warwick, Rhode Island
- League: Eastern Hockey League
- Division: East
- Founded: 2022
- Home arena: Thayer Arena
- Colors: Green, yellow and blue
- General manager: Toby O'Brien
- Head coach: James Mello

Franchise history
- 2022–Present: HC Rhode Island

The HC Rhode Island are a Tier II junior ice hockey team playing in the Eastern Hockey League (EHL). Rhode Island plays their home games at the Thayer Arena in Warwick, Rhode Island.

== History ==
In March of 2022, the Rhode Island Hockey Academy was approved by the Eastern Hockey League to found a new Tier II franchise and begin play the following season.

== Season-by-season records ==
Season	GP	W	L	T	OTL	Pts	GF	GA	Regular season finish	Playoffs
2022–23	46	17	25	3	1	38	114	170	2nd of 5, Central Div. t-15th of 19, EHL	Lost Div. Semifinal series, 1–2 Connecticut Chiefs
2023–24	46	18	23	2	3	41	134	159	4th of 6, Central Div. t-16th of 23, EHL	Lost Div. Qualifier, 3–5 (Connecticut Chiefs)
2024–25	46	20	18	6	2	48	128	132	2nd of 5, Central Div. 11th of 21, EHL	Won Div. Semifinal series, 2–1 (Connecticut Nor'Easter); Lost Div. Final series, 0–2 (Providence Capitals)
2025–26	50	37	12	1	0	75	214	111	1st of 5, Central Div. 3rd of 20, EHL	Won Div. Semifinal 2-0 (New York Apple Core); Won Div Finals 2-0 (Connecticut Nor'Easter); Lost League Semifinal 0-2 (New Jersey Bears)
