= Hersheypark Arena =

Arena in Hershey, Pennsylvania

- "The Old Barn"

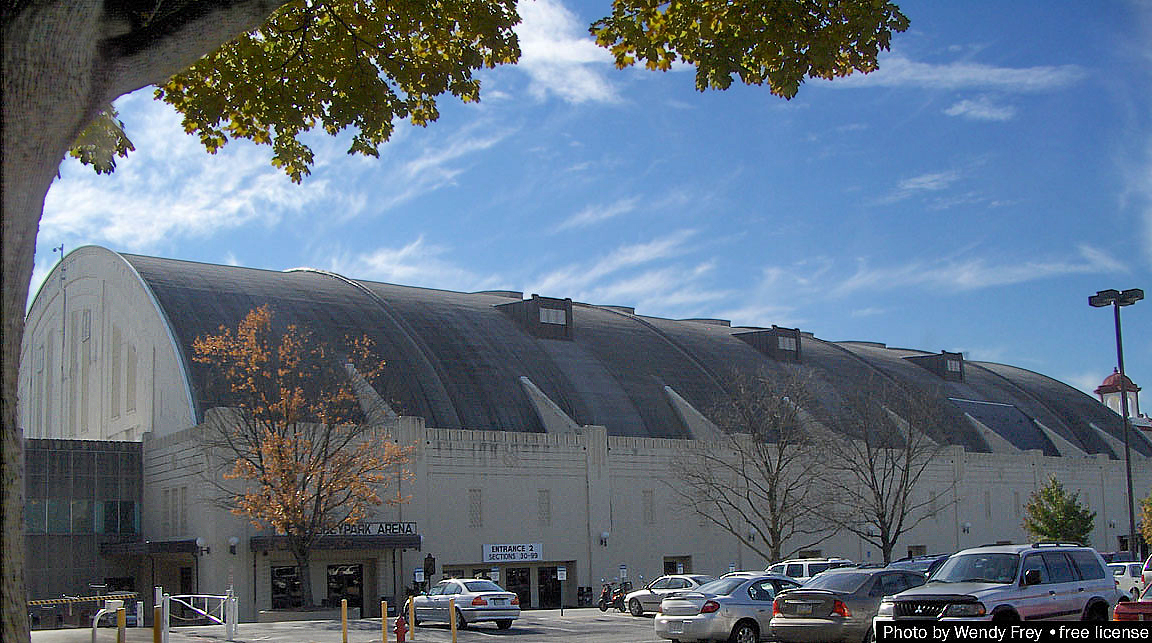
- Interactive map of Hersheypark Arena
- Former names: Hershey Sports Arena (1936–1972)
- Location: 100 West Hersheypark Drive; Hershey, Pennsylvania 17033
- Coordinates: 40°17′17″N 76°39′23″W
- Owner: Hershey Entertainment and Resorts Company
- Operator: Hershey Entertainment and Resorts Company
- Capacity: 7,286
- Surface: Ice

Construction
- Groundbreaking: 1935
- Built: 1936
- Opened: 1936

Tenants
- Hershey Bears (AHL) 1938–2002; Hershey Impact (NPSL) 1988–1991; Hershey Cubs (USPHL/EHL) 2021–present Harrisburg Heat (MASL2) 2025–present

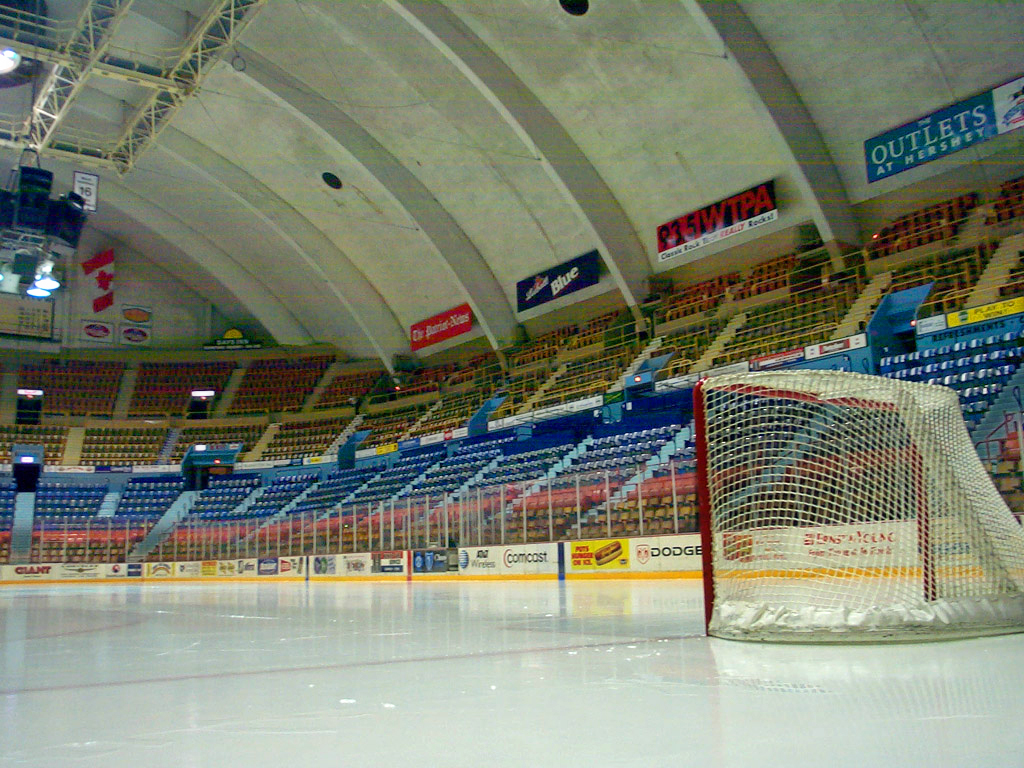
View from ice level

Hersheypark Arena is a multi-purpose indoor arena located in Hershey, Pennsylvania, United States, managed by Hershey Entertainment & Resorts Company. The arena has a seating capacity for hockey of 7,286 people and with standing room can fit in excess of 8,000.

The arena opened in 1936 as the Hershey Sports Arena and was the longtime home of the Hershey Bears of the American Hockey League (AHL) from 1936 to 2002 until their move to Giant Center. It was originally the home of the Eastern Amateur Hockey League Hershey Bears from 1936 to 1938, while the Hershey Impact of the National Professional Soccer League played at the arena from 1988 to 1991. Since 1998, it has served as the home of the Lebanon Valley College Flying Dutchman ice hockey team. It’s also currently home to the Hershey Cubs, formerly of the United States Premier Hockey League and now Eastern Hockey League, and the Harrisburg Heat of the Major Arena Soccer League 2 (MASL2).

== History ==
When built in 1936 as the Hershey Sports Arena, the building was the largest monolithic structure in the United States in which not a single seat suffered from an obstructed view. For 64 years it was the home of the Hershey Bears hockey team from 1938 to 2002. The second sport at the arena was basketball. It hosted the PIAA basketball and wrestling championships, and it also served as the home of the Hershey Impact, a National Professional Soccer League team from 1988 to 1991. It has also hosted the Ice Capades, Disney on Ice, professional boxing, tennis competitions, and the World Wrestling Federation's (WWF) In Your House 5 pay-per-view in 1995. Previously it hosted WWF's Saturday Night's Main Event III on October 31, 1985 (aired November 2) with the main event being a tag-team match featuring WWF Champion Hulk Hogan teaming with André the Giant facing the team of Big John Studd and King Kong Bundy.

On October 13, 1953, the arena also hosted an extravagant birthday celebration for President Dwight D. Eisenhower whose farm and "weekend White House" was located in nearby Gettysburg. Phish performed and recorded their show, on December 1, 1995, which was later released as a live album, entitled Live Phish 12.01.95.

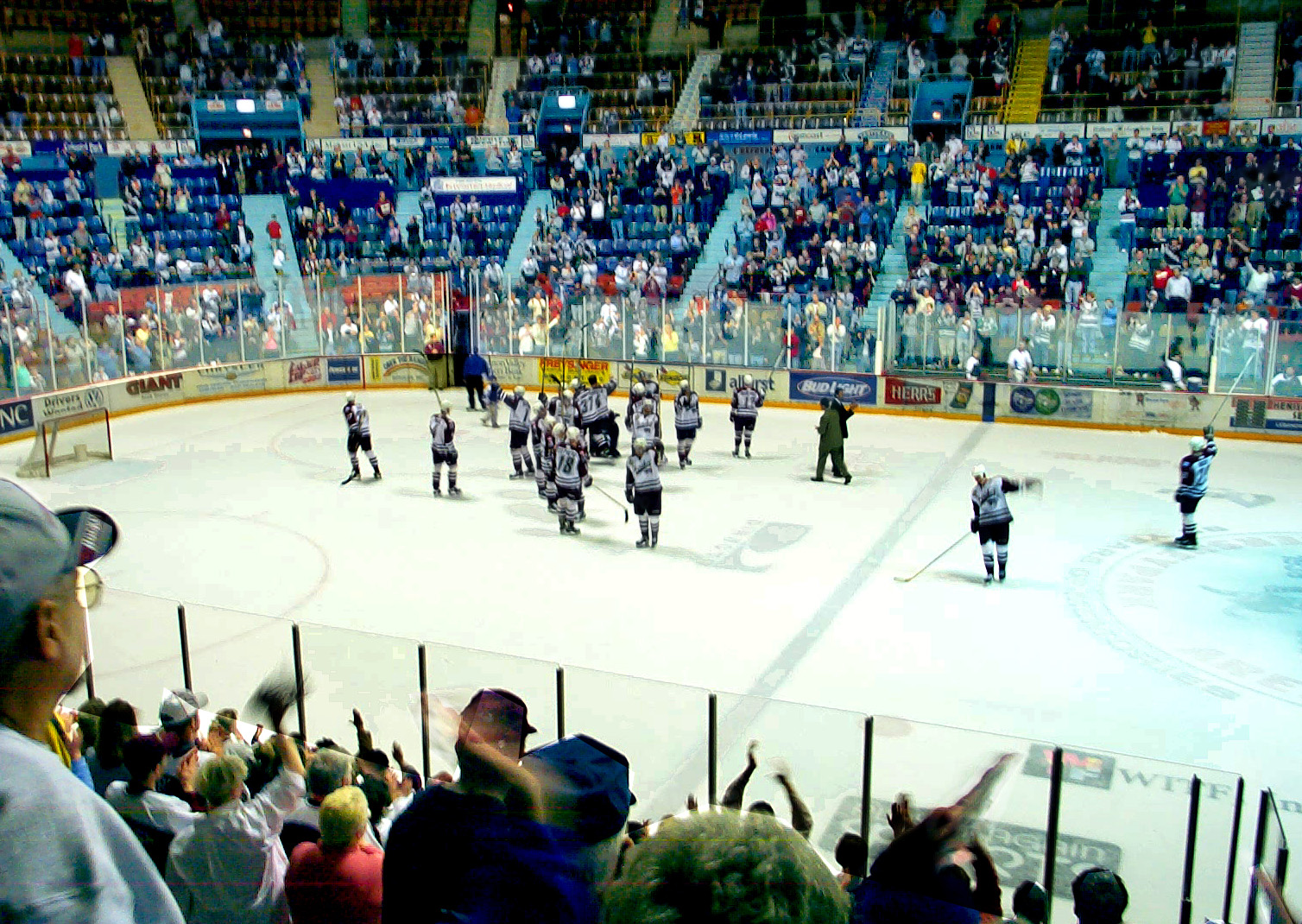
Bears players salute fans after final game at Hersheypark Arena

=== Basketball ===
On March 2, 1962, Philadelphia Warriors center Wilt Chamberlain recorded a record-setting 100 points in an NBA game against the New York Knicks, a record that still stands today.

Date	Home	Score	Away	Game Type	Attendance
December 29, 1961	Philadelphia Warriors	123-118	Los Angeles Lakers	RS	5,000
January 26, 1962	Philadelphia Warriors	136-110	St. Louis Hawks	RS	4,473
March 2, 1962	Philadelphia Warriors	169-147	New York Knicks	RS	4,124

=== Roof fire ===
On July 5, 2012, a fire damaged the arena, which was in the midst of refurbishment. At about 3:00 PM local time, the fire was upgraded to five alarms. The fire burned for about two hours before being extinguished. The roof was damaged, but reported to not be in danger of collapse. The cause of the fire is still unknown.

== Current use ==
Hersheypark Arena is the home rink for the Lebanon Valley College Flying Dutchmen Women's and Men's ice hockey teams. LVC competes in NCAA Division III as of 2016, and previously competed in the ACHA. In addition, the arena hosts the Hershey Junior Bears, a youth team sponsored by the Bears organization. On most weekends during the fall and winter months, the rink is open to the public for ice skating.

Annually, it hosts part of the Music in the Parks competition.

In 2021, the Hershey Cubs of the USPHL Premier League began using the arena as home ice.

Beginning with the 2025-26 season, the Harrisburg Heat of the Major Arena Soccer League 2 (MASL2) moved to the Hersheypark Arena.

== Notes and references ==
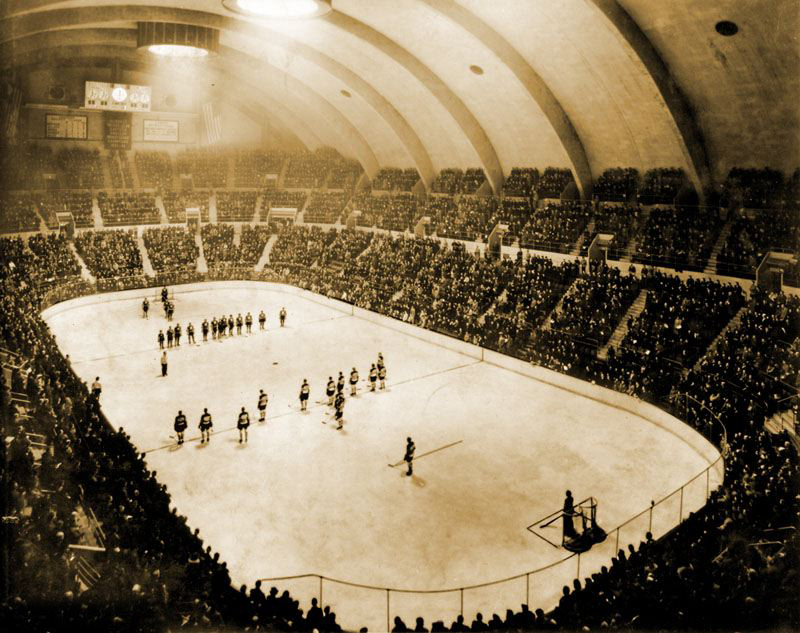
Hershey Bears opening night, 1937

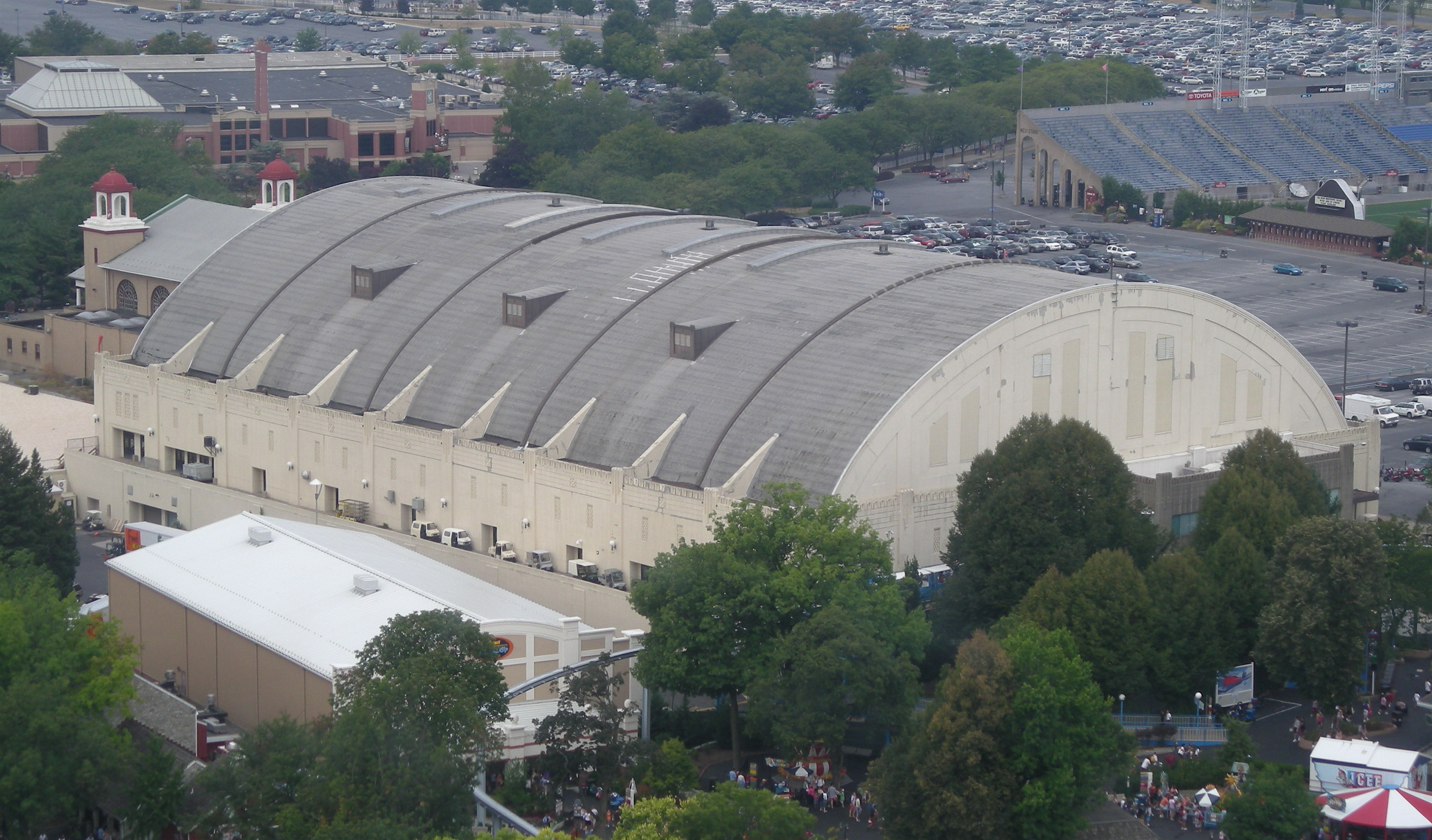
Aerial view

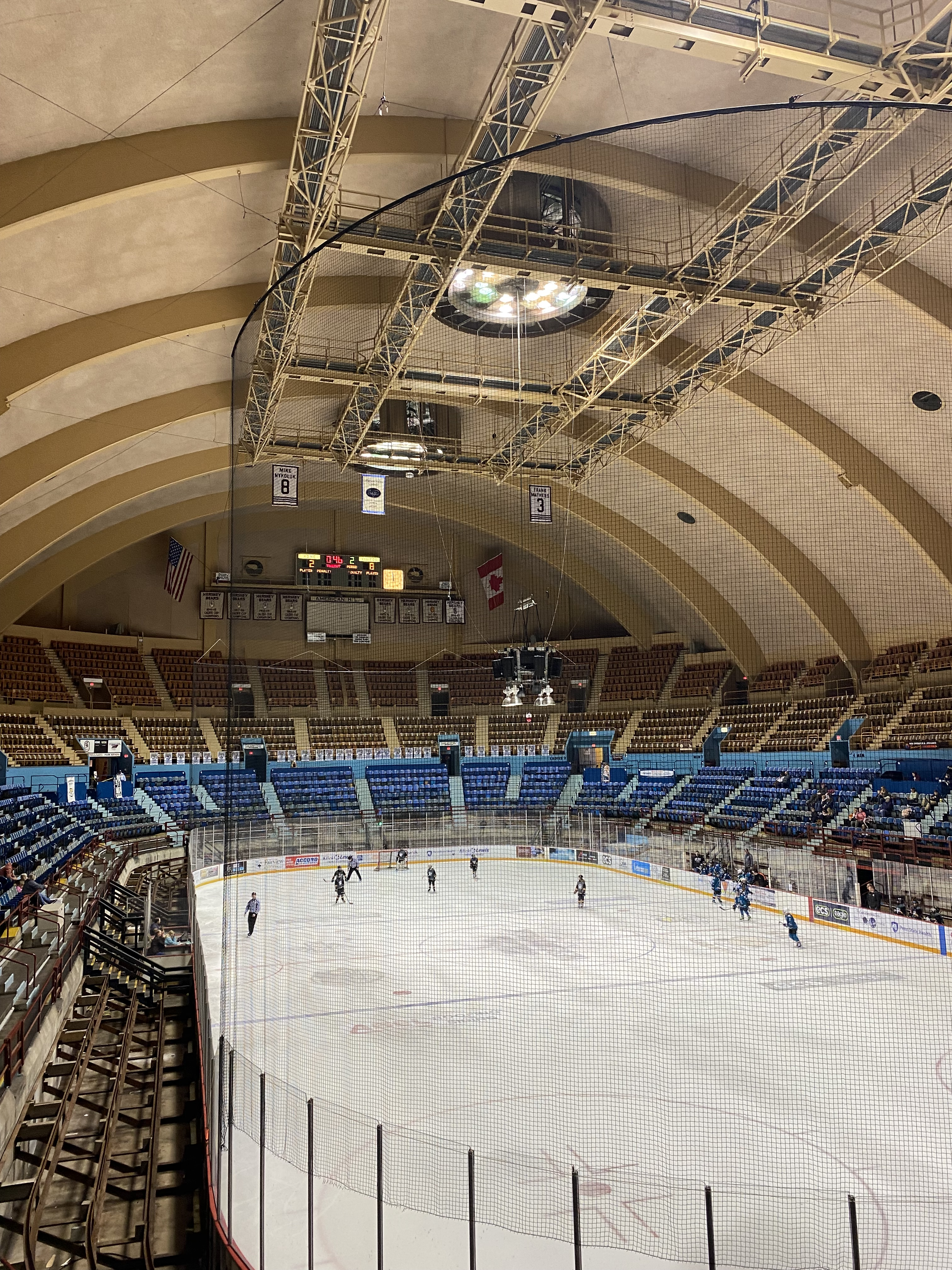

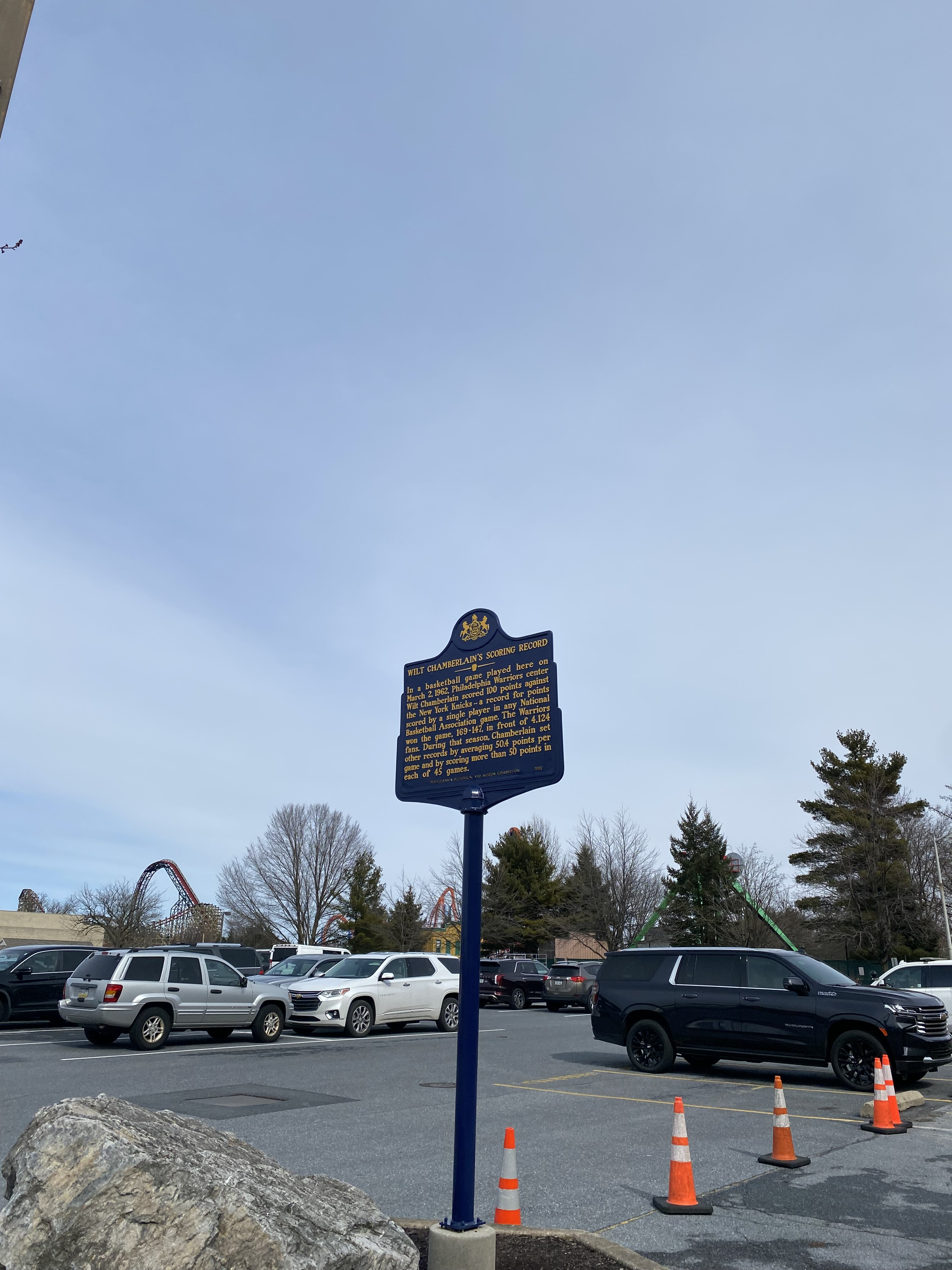
