= Russ Sinkewich =

American ice hockey player

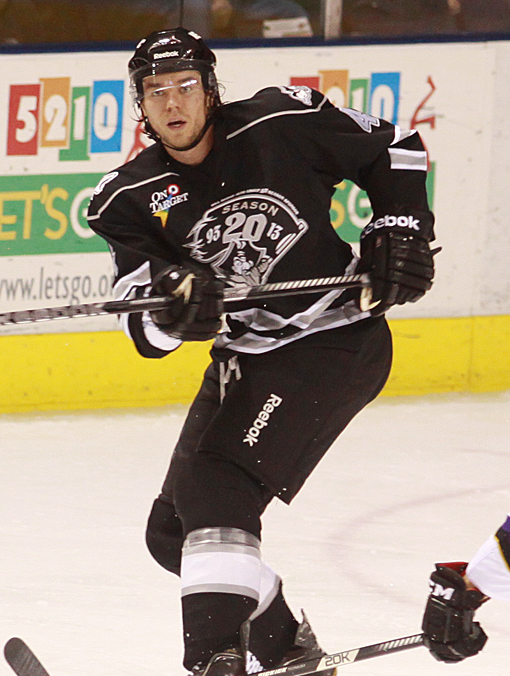
- Sinkewich with the Portland Pirates in 2013
- Born: September 21, 1985 (age 40) Westlake, Ohio, U.S.
- Height: 6 ft 4 in (193 cm)
- Weight: 220 lb (100 kg; 15 st 10 lb)
- Position: Defense
- Shot: Right
- Played for: Lake Erie Monsters; Milwaukee Admirals; Abbotsford Heat; Bridgeport Sound Tigers; Portland Pirates; Texas Stars
- NHL draft: Undrafted
- Playing career: 2009–2014

Russ Sinkewich (born September 21, 1985) is a retired American professional ice hockey defenseman who most recently played for the Idaho Steelheads in the ECHL.

== Playing career ==
Before launching his professional career, Sinkewich spent four seasons playing collegiate hockey at Bowling Green State University. As a member of the Bowling Green Falcons men's ice hockey team, he competed at the NCAA Division I level, where he developed his skills as a reliable defenseman.

In the 2011–12 season, his fourth as a pro, Sinkewich started the year with the Alaska Aces for the second straight season. He was once again loaned to the Abbotsford Heat, where his strong performance over 21 games led to him earning an AHL contract with the Bridgeport Sound Tigers on February 29, 2012, for the rest of the season.

With no AHL offers for the upcoming season, Sinkewich chose to return to the Alaska Aces, signing on for a third straight year. During the 2012–13 season, he played 23 games with the Aces before being traded to the Gwinnett Gladiators on December 13, 2012. There, he tallied 3 goals in 11 games, which helped catch the attention of the AHL's Portland Pirates. He joined the Pirates later that season and stayed with the team for the remainder of the year.

During the subsequent off-season, Sinkewich's ECHL rights were first dealt by the Gwinnett Gladiators to the San Francisco Bulls on June 10, 2013. A few months later, on August 27, 2013, the Bulls traded him to the Colorado Eagles in exchange for defenseman Collin Bowman.

== Career statistics ==
			Regular season					Playoffs
Season	Team	League	GP	G	A	Pts	PIM	GP	G	A	Pts	PIM
2004–05	Lincoln Stars	USHL	37	1	3	4	39	—	—	—	—	—
2005–06	Bowling Green State University	CCHA	19	0	1	1	14	—	—	—	—	—
2006–07	Bowling Green State University	CCHA	37	0	1	1	38	—	—	—	—	—
2007–08	Bowling Green State University	CCHA	17	0	1	1	14	—	—	—	—	—
2008–09	Bowling Green State University	CCHA	22	0	2	2	65	—	—	—	—	—
2008–09	Johnstown Chiefs	ECHL	16	0	1	1	17	—	—	—	—	—
2008–09	Lake Erie Monsters	AHL	5	0	0	0	2	—	—	—	—	—
2008–09	Milwaukee Admirals	AHL	5	0	1	1	2	—	—	—	—	—
2009–10	Johnstown Chiefs	ECHL	70	2	13	15	97	—	—	—	—	—
2010–11	Alaska Aces	ECHL	42	2	6	8	55	9	0	2	2	2
2010–11	Abbotsford Heat	AHL	2	0	0	0	0	—	—	—	—	—
2011–12	Alaska Aces	ECHL	23	2	4	6	36	—	—	—	—	—
2011–12	Abbotsford Heat	AHL	21	0	0	0	24	—	—	—	—	—
2011–12	Bridgeport Sound Tigers	AHL	8	0	1	1	4	—	—	—	—	—
2012–13	Alaska Aces	ECHL	23	0	4	4	29	—	—	—	—	—
2012–13	Gwinnett Gladiators	ECHL	11	3	2	5	2	—	—	—	—	—
2012–13	Portland Pirates	AHL	21	0	4	4	15	1	0	0	0	0
2013–14	Toledo Walleye	ECHL	33	1	16	17	39	—	—	—	—	—
2013–14	Lake Erie Monsters	AHL	1	0	1	1	0	—	—	—	—	—
2013–14	Texas Stars	AHL	8	1	2	3	2	—	—	—	—	—
2013–14	Idaho Steelheads	ECHL	20	1	3	4	24	11	0	0	0	10
AHL totals			71	1	9	10	49	1	0	0	0	0
