= 2014–15 USPHL Premier season =

- League: United States Premier Hockey League; Premier
- Sport: Ice hockey
- Duration: Regular season September 2014 – February 2015; Postseason; March 2015
- Games: 50
- Teams: 11

Regular season
- Season champions: New Jersey Hitmen
- Top scorer: Mike Laffin (New Jersey Hitmen)

Dineen Cup Playoffs
- Finals champions: New Jersey Hitmen
- Runners-up: Philadelphia Jr. Flyers

USPHL Premier seasons
- ← 2013–14 2015–16 →

The 2014–15 USPHL Premier season was the 2nd season of the Premier Division of the United States Premier Hockey League (USPHL). The regular season ran from September 2014 to February 2015 with an 50-game schedule. The New Jersey Hitmen won the regular season championship and went on to defeat the Philadelphia Jr. Flyers 2 games to 0 for the Dineen Cup.

== Member changes ==
- The Rochester Jr. Americans and Springfield Pics were both promoted from the Elite Division.

== Regular season ==
The standings at the end of the regular season were as follows:

Note: y = clinched division title; z = clinched regular season title

=== Standings ===
Team	GP	W	L	OTL	Pts	GF	GA
yz – New Jersey Hitmen	50	44	4	2	90	273	117
y – Boston Junior Bruins	50	38	8	4	80	207	122
y – Philadelphia Jr. Flyers	50	32	10	8	72	216	153
y – Islanders Hockey Club	50	27	19	4	58	183	164
y – P.A.L. Jr. Islanders	50	27	19	4	58	165	170
y – Bay State Breakers	50	27	20	3	57	147	153
y – South Shore Kings	50	23	24	3	49	166	163
y – Rochester Jr. Americans	50	22	25	3	47	170	175
Portland Jr. Pirates	50	16	29	5	37	132	218
Connecticut Jr. Rangers	50	10	32	8	28	123	213
Springfield Pics	50	9	37	4	22	106	239

== Dineen Cup playoffs ==
=== Divisional Round ===
Teams are reseeded after the preliminary and quarterfinal rounds.

Quarterfinals (Best-of-3)
1	New Jersey Hitmen	7	7	-
8	Rochester Jr. Americans	1	2	-
2	Boston Junior Bruins	1	5	1
7	South Shore Kings	2*	1	2
3	Philadelphia Jr. Flyers	1	5	-
6	Bay State Breakers	0	2	-
4	Islanders Hockey Club	6*	8	-
5	P.A.L. Jr. Islanders	5	1	-

Semifinals (Best-of-3)
1	New Jersey Hitmen	9	8	-
7	South Shore Kings	0	0	-
3	Philadelphia Jr. Flyers	6**	3	-
4	Islanders Hockey Club	5	2	-

Championship (Best-of-3)
1	New Jersey Hitmen	7	2	-
3	Philadelphia Jr. Flyers	4	1	-

Note: * denotes overtime period(s)
