= Portland Jr. Pirates =

- City: Saco, Maine
- League: Atlantic Junior Hockey League; Eastern Junior Hockey League; United States Premier Hockey League (USPHL) - Premier Div.
- Founded: 2000 (EJHL); 2004 (AtJHL)
- Home arena: MHG Ice Centre
- Colors: Black, red, silver, white
- Owner(s): Selects Sports Management
- General manager: Brad Church
- Head coach: Kent Hulst

Franchise history
- AtJHL franchise
- 2004–2012: Portland Jr. Pirates
- EJHL/USPHL franchise
- 2000–2012: Green Mountain Glades
- 2012–2016: Portland Jr. Pirates

The Portland Jr. Pirates were a Tier III Jr. A ice hockey team that played their home games at the MHG Ice Centre in Saco, Maine. The organization continues to host youth hockey programs in the Massachusetts Premier Development Hockey League.

== History ==
From 2004 to 2012, the Portland Jr. Pirates organization had a Tier III Junior A team playing in the Atlantic Junior Hockey League (AtJHL). In 2012, Selects Sports Management, the owners of the Green Mountain Glades hockey club that played in the Eastern Junior Hockey League (EJHL), announced that they were moving the EJHL franchise to Saco, Maine, and merge the team with the Portland Jr. Pirates organization.

With the relocation of the EJHL franchise, the Jr. Pirates dropped their membership in the AtJHL and only played in the EJHL. However, after only one season, there was a major re-shuffling in Tier III junior hockey leagues that led to the dissolution of the EJHL caused by several members leaving to form the United States Premier Hockey League (USPHL). After the reorganization of leagues, the former EJHL Jr. Pirates joined the Premier Division of the USPHL. The Jr. Pirates organization also fielded a Tier III Junior B team in the Empire Junior Hockey League (EmJHL). When the USPHL was founded, it also absorbed the EmJHL which led to this team becoming part of the USPHL Elite Division.

After the 2015–16 season, the Jr. Pirates organization and its teams were no longer listed as part of the USPHL. The Pirates organization continued to field teams in youth hockey at the Midget 18U, Midget 16U, Bantam, Peewee, and Squirt and other various levels as well as in lacrosse.

== Season-by-season records ==
Season	GP	W	L	OTL	SOL	Pts	GF	GA	Regular season finish	Playoffs
Eastern Junior Hockey League
2012–13	45	10	33	2	0	23	114	202	7th of 7, North; 13th of 14, EJHL	Did not qualify
USPHL Premier
2013–14	44	14	30	3	1	32	182	186	8th of 9 USPHL Premier	Lost Quarterfinals, 0-2 vs. Boston Jr. Bruins
2014–15	50	16	29	5	—	37	132	218	9th of 11; USPHL Premier	Did not qualify
2015–16	44	12	28	4	—	28	126	168	10th of 12; USPHL Premier	Lost Play-in Game, 1-3 vs. Connecticut Jr. Rangers

== Alumni ==
The Jr. Pirates have produced a number of alumni playing in higher levels of junior hockey, NCAA Division I, Division III college and professional programs.

- Russ Sinkewich – various American Hockey League and ECHL teams from 2008 to 2014.
