= Hartford Jr. Wolfpack =

- City: Cromwell, Connecticut
- League: USPHL-Premier
- Division: Mid Atlantic
- Founded: 2003
- Folded: 2019
- Home arena: Champions Skating Center
- Colors: Navy blue, red, white, silver
- Owners: Dan McCarthy; Bob Crawford
- General manager: Mike Tenney
- Head coach: Mike Tenney

Franchise history
- 2003–2010: Hartford Jr. Wolfpack
- 2010–2013: Connecticut Jr. Wolfpack
- 2013–2019: Hartford Jr. Wolfpack

The Hartford Jr. Wolfpack were a junior ice hockey team that most recently played in the United States Premier Hockey League (USPHL). The team played their home games at the Champions Skating Center located in Cromwell, Connecticut. From 2003 to 2017, the Jr. Wolfpack were members of the Eastern Hockey League (EHL) and its predecessor, the Atlantic Junior Hockey League (AJHL), while sanctioned as a Tier III junior team by USA Hockey before it joined the unsanctioned USPHL. The team was removed from the USPHL schedule at the beginning of the 2019–20 season.

The organization also fielded a developmental team in the USPHL Elite Division as well as youth hockey select teams at the Midget U18, Midget 16U, Bantam, Peewee, and Squirt and other various levels. The Elite team played in the former Tier III Junior B level Metropolitan Junior Hockey League until 2016.

From the 2010–11 to the 2012–13 season the Jr. Wolfpack changed their moniker from Hartford to Connecticut.

== Season-by-season records ==
Season	GP	W	L	T	OTL	Pts	GF	GA	Regular season finish	Playoffs
Atlantic Junior Hockey League
2003–04	No information								1st of 6, AJHL	Lost Semifinal game, 2–3 vs. Philadelphia Little Flyers
2004–05	41	9	27	0	5	23	112	193	4th of 4, North; 8th of 8, AJHL	Did not qualify
2005–06	42	20	19	0	3	43	137	170	6th of 11, AJHL	Won Quarterfinals, 2–1 vs. Northern Cyclones; Lost Semifinal game, 4–7 vs. New York Bobcats
2006–07	44	17	24	0	3	37	135	182	5th of 6, North; 10th of 12, AJHL	
2007–08	45	10	27	0	8	28	138	210	5th of 6, North; 10th of 11, AJHL	
2008–09	42	27	10	0	5	59	143	98	2nd of 6, North; 3rd of 12, AJHL	
2009–10	42	18	20	0	4	40	138	140	4th of 6, North; 7th of 12, AJHL	
2010–11	44	25	14	0	5	55	175	136	4th of 6, North; 5th of 12, AJHL	
2011–12	44	21	16	6	1	49	147	106	6th of 12, AJHL	
2012–13	44	28	13	2	1	59	149	107	3rd of 12, AJHL	Won Quarterfinals, 2–0 vs. New York Bobcats; Lost Semifinals, 0–2 vs. Wilkes-Barre/Scranton Knights
Eastern Hockey League
2013–14	44	20	16	4	4	48	125	121	3rd of 6, Central; 7th of 17, EHL	Won Round 1, 2–0 vs. New Jersey Rockets; Lost Quarterfinals, 0–2 vs. Philadelphia Little Flyers
2014–15	44	24	17	—	3	51	167	133	4th of 5, Central; 8th of 19, EHL	Won Round 1, 2–0 vs. Philadelphia Junior Flyers; Lost Quarterfinals, 0–2 vs. Philadelphia Little Flyers
2015–16	41	26	10	—	5	57	159	146	3rd of 9, South Conf. 5th of 18, EHL-Premier	Won First Round, 2–1 vs. Philadelphia Junior Flyers; Lost Second Round, 0–2 vs. Connecticut Oilers
2016–17	48	17	29	—	2	36	125	162	2nd of 4, Central Div. 6th of 8, South Conf. 14th of 17, EHL-Premier	Lost First Round, 0–2 vs. Philadelphia Junior Flyers
United States Premier Hockey League
2017–18	44	10	33	—	1	21	117	221	8th of 9, Mid Atlantic Div. 40th of 44, USPHL-Premier	Lost First Round, 1–2 vs. New Jersey Rockets-Premier
2018–19	44	11	31	—	2	24	108	198	7th of 7, North East Div. 45th of 52, USPHL-Premier	Did not qualify

== Alumni ==
The Jr. Wolfpack have produced a number of alumni playing in higher levels of junior hockey, NCAA Division I, Division III college and professional programs, including:

- Rob Bellamy (drafted by the Philadelphia Flyers in the 2004 NHL entry draft) - Adirondack Phantoms (AHL)
- Kurt Reynolds - Basingstoke Bison (EIHL)
- Jordan Samuels-Thomas (drafted by the Atlanta Thrashers in the 2009 NHL entry draft) - Ontario Reign (AHL)
