= Eastern Hockey League (2013) =

American Tier III Junior ice hockey league

- Current season, competition or edition: 2024–25 EHL season
- Sport: Ice hockey
- Founded: 2003
- No. of teams: 18 — EHL; 14 — EHL Premier
- Country: United States
- Most recent champions: EHL — New Jersey 87's EHLP — New Jersey 87's (2024–25)
- Most titles: 3 (Northern Cyclones), (Walpole Express)
- Website: EHL

The Eastern Hockey League (EHL) is an American Tier II junior ice hockey league with teams in the Northeastern and Mid-Atlantic United States. The EHL was officially announced on June 6, 2013, after the Atlantic Junior Hockey League (AtJHL) welcomed six new members from the old Eastern Junior Hockey League and the AtJHL re-branded itself under the EHL banner

The league prepares high school and college aged players for possible advancement to college and professional hockey.

== History ==
The Atlantic Junior Hockey League was part of the Atlantic Metropolitan Hockey League organization and was formed in 2003 with a stated goal to "meet the needs of the junior hockey community and the players it serves in the Eastern United States". The AtJHL played its first season in 2003–04 with six teams that had previously played in the Junior B Metropolitan Junior Hockey League. On May 30, 2012 the AtJHL announced that after nine years of being a part of the Atlantic Metropolitan Hockey League, the 12 AtJHL ownership groups successfully became a stand-alone entity. After the split, the AtJHL was managed and governed solely by the league owners.

In 2013, Tier III junior hockey leagues underwent a large reorganization that led to the dissolution of the Eastern Junior Hockey League and six of their former members joining the AtJHL. Prior to the 2013–14 season, the AtJHL re-branded to become the Eastern Hockey League (EHL). The six members who came from the EJHL were the Boston Bandits, Connecticut Oilers, New Hampshire Jr. Monarchs, New York Apple Core, Philadelphia Revolution, and the Valley Jr. Warriors.

In December 2014, the EHL announced the Connecticut Nighthawks as an expansion franchise to start in the 2015–16. They also announced the formation of the EHL-Elite Division and that eight teams would participate in the first season composed of the former Junior B teams for EHL organizations. The formation of the Elite Division led to the previous Junior A members to be placed in the EHL-Premier Division. In May 2015, the North American Hockey League, a Tier II league, announced that the New Jersey Junior Titans and the Wilkes-Barre/Scranton Knights had been approved to elevate their organizations. After their promotion, the two EHL franchises went dormant.

In March 2016, the EHL announced that it was changing the name of the Elite Division to 19U Elite Division for the 2016–17 season and doubling in size by adding eight more teams, mostly the prospect teams from the Premier Division's South Conference teams. However, the 19U Elite Connecticut Nighthawks team were dropped from the schedule prior to their first season.

In December 2016, it was announced that six organizations (the Boston Bandits, Connecticut Nighthawks, Hartford Jr. Wolfpack, New Hampshire Jr. Monarchs, New Jersey Rockets, and the Northern Cyclones) would be leaving the EHL for the 2017–18 season for the United States Premier Hockey League (USPHL). The Bandits, Rockets, and Cyclones had already been announced as adding free-to-play teams in the USPHL's National Collegiate Development Conference (NCDC) for the 2017–18 season. All six organizations will add their Premier and Elite teams to the USPHL's Premier and Elite Divisions.

In February 2017, the EHL announced that they would expand to make up for the teams lost to the NCDC. The first team announced was New Hampshire Avalanche, an organization that previously only had youth teams. Next, it was announced the league would be adding the teams from the North American 3 Atlantic Hockey League (the former Metropolitan Junior Hockey League). The six teams from the NA3AHL were the Central Penn Panthers, Jersey Wildcats, Long Island Royals, Metro Fighting Moose (who left for the USHPL after the announcement), New Jersey Renegades, and the return of the Wilkes-Barre/Scranton Knights. The league also listed the New Jersey 87's and Cape Cod-based Total Athletics. The one-year dormant New York Bobcats also returned as the Bobcats Royals as part of an organizational merger with the Long Island Jr. Royals of the NA3AHL. The Connecticut Oilers relocated from Norwalk to Hamden following the announcement that the ownership of the USHL's Cedar Rapids RoughRiders added a team called the Connecticut RoughRiders that will play out of the Oilers' former arena in Norwalk.

In March 2017, the EHL announced their new divisional structure for the 2017–18 season with 16 teams in the Premier and 17 in the Elite, although the Elite would decrease to 13 after the departures of the Connecticut Oilers Elite team, the Lehigh Valley Jr. Rebels, Long Island Royals, and Metro Moose. In May 2017, the league announced that they would reorganize their two-tier league with the top tier (formerly called the Premier) being only called the Eastern Hockey League and the lower tier being called the Eastern Hockey League Premier Division. The naming conventions were changed to put the emphasis on the top-level league for college development.

In 2022, the EHL announced it would be self-governed and withdrew from USA Hockey sanctioning.

== Teams ==
=== EHL teams (2026-27 Season) ===
Eastern Hockey League
Conference	Team	Arena	Location	Joined
Mid-Atlantic
Mid-Atlantic	Connecticut Nor'Easter	International Skating Center	Simsbury, Connecticut	2012 (Note: Relocated franchise)
Mid-Atlantic	Elite Golden Knights	Total Mortgage Arena	Bridgeport, Connecticut	2026
Mid-Atlantic	Hersey Cubs	Hersheypark Arena	Hershey, Pennsylvania	2021
Mid-Atlantic	New Jersey 87's	Jersey Shore Arena	Wall Township, New Jersey	2018
Mid-Atlantic	New Jersey Bears	Flemington Ice Arena	Flemington, New Jersey	2020
Mid-Atlantic	New York Apple Core	Brewster Ice Arena	Brewster, New York	2013
Mid-Atlantic	Pennsylvania Huntsmen	Power Play Rinks	Exton, Pennsylvania	2023
Mid-Atlantic	Philadelphia Little Flyers	IceWorks Skating Complex	Aston, Pennsylvania	2003
Mid-Atlantic	Philadelphia Hockey Club	Hollydell Ice Arena	Sewell, New Jersey	2022
Northeast
Northeast	Bridgewater Bandits	Bridgewater Ice Arena	Bridgewater, Massachusetts	2023 (Note: Franchise had previously been a member of the EHL)
Northeast	East Coast Wizards	Edge Sports Center	Bedford, Massachusetts	2014
Northeast	Express Hockey Club	Rodman Arena	Walpole, Massachusetts	2005
Northeast	HC Rhode Island	Thayer Arena	Warwick, Rhode Island	2022
Northeast	New Hampshire Avalanche	Ice Den Arena	Hooksett, New Hampshire	2017
Northeast	Providence Capitals	Dennis M Lynch Arena	Providence, Rhode Island	2023
Northeast	Seahawks Hockey Club	Tony Kent Arena	South Dennis, Massachusetts	2017
Northeast	Valley Jr. Warriors	Haverhill Valley Forum	Haverhill, Massachusetts	2013

==== EHL timeline ====
Active Active non-member Future

=== EHL Premier teams ===
EHL Premier
Division	Team	Arena	Location	Joined
Northeast	Bridgewater Bandits	Bridgewater Ice Arena	Bridgewater, Massachusetts	2023
Northeast	CT Nor'Easter AAA Academy	International Skating Center of Connecticut	Simsbury, Connecticut	2024
Northeast	Express Hockey Club	Rodman Arena	Walpole, Massachusetts	2015
Northeast	New England Wolves	Merrill Fay Arena	Laconia, New Hampshire	2015
Northeast	New Hampshire Avalanche	Ice Den Arena	Hooksett, New Hampshire	2019
Northeast	Providence Capitals	Rhode Island Sports Center	North Smithfield, Rhode Island	2024
Northeast	Seahawks Hockey Club	Tony Kent Arena	South Dennis, Massachusetts	2021
Northeast	Valley Jr. Warriors	Haverhill Valley Forum	Haverhill, Massachusetts	2015
Mid-Atlantic	Atlantic City Seals	Atlantic City Skate Zone	Atlantic City, New Jersey	2022
Mid-Atlantic	Hersey Cubs	-	Hersey, Pennsylvania	2026
Mid-Atlantic	New Jersey 87's	Jersey Shore Arena	Wall Township, New Jersey	2017
Mid-Atlantic	New Jersey Bears	Flemington Ice Arena	Flemington, New Jersey	2020 (Note: Relocated)
Mid-Atlantic	Pennsylvania Huntsmen	Power Play Rinks	Exton, Pennsylvania	2022
Mid-Atlantic	Philadelphia Little Flyers	IceWorks Skating Complex	Aston, Pennsylvania	2017
Mid-Atlantic	Union Thunder	Union Sports Arena	Union, New Jersey	2022

=== Former teams ===
- Binghamton Jr. Senators — AtJHL, 2006–2010. Relocated and became Wilkes-Barre/Scranton Knights.
- Boston Bandits — EHL, 2013–2017. Joined the USPHL and its National Collegiate Development Conference.
- Boston Dukes — EHL, 2024–2025. Relocated and joined the USPHL and its National Collegiate Development Conference.
- Boston Bulldogs — AtJHL, 2004–2012. Relocated and became Boston Junior Rangers.
- Boston Junior Eagles - EHL 2024 - folded after 1 season
- Boston Junior Terriers — EHL 2023–2024. Joined the USPHL and its National Collegiate Development Conference.
- Brewster Bulldogs – 19U Elite, 2016–17. Joined from the Metropolitan Junior Hockey League. Junior organization merged with the New York Apple Core.
- Central Penn Panthers – EHLP, 2017–2019. Joined from the North American 3 Atlantic Hockey League.
- Connecticut Nighthawks — EHL, 2015–2017. Joined the USPHL and its National Collegiate Development Conference.
- Connecticut Chiefs — EHL 2017–2024. Franchise purchased and relocated to Simsbury and re-branded Connecticut Nor'Easter.
- Connecticut Oilers — EHL 2013–2017 Re-branded to Connecticut Chiefs in 2017.
- Hartford Jr. Wolfpack — Charter member of the AtJHL/EHL, 2003–2017. Joined the USPHL Premier Division.
- Hudson Valley Eagles — AtJHL, 2005–2007.
- Jersey Shore Wildcats — EHL Premier, 2017–18. Joined from the NA3AHL in 2017, not listed in 2018.
- Lehigh Valley Jr. Rebels — 19U Elite Division, 2016–17. Returned with an EHL team in 2018–19, but were removed by the league early into the season due to using an ineligible player.
- Maine Eclipse — EHL/EHLP, 2020–2021. Initially announced as the Keene Eclipse, based out of Keene, New Hampshire, in the EHL and EHL Premier for the 2020–21 season, but relocated before the season to Biddeford, Maine. The Eclipse then withdrew about halfway through the season. Returned for the 2021–22 season, but were removed from the schedule after four games played by the EHL team and three by the EHLP team.
- Laconia Leafs — AtJHL, 2005–2013. Renamed New Hampshire Lakers but went dormant for 2013–14 season. Relocated to Waterville Valley, New Hampshire, in 2014 and returned as the New England Wolves. Left again for USPHL 2026.
- New Hampshire Junior Monarchs — EHL, 2013–2017. Joined the USPHL Premier Division.
- New Jersey Titans — Charter member of AtJHL, 2003–04. AtJHL team dormant from 2004 to 2012. Returned from 2012 to 2015. EHL team went dormant again in 2015 after organization joined the NAHL.
- New Jersey Renegades - (2017-2025) EHL Premier move to the USPHL Premier League
- New Jersey Rockets — AtJHL/EHL, 2004–2017. Joined the USPHL and its National Collegiate Development Conference.
- New York Bobcats — Charter member of AtJHL, 2003–2016. Was not listed for the 2016–17 season but returned in 2017 as the New York Bobcats Royals as part of their merge with the Long Island Jr. Royals. Not listed again for 2018–19.
- New York Bridgemen — EHLP, 2019–20. Not listed as a member of the EHL Premier in the 2020–21 season.
- North Carolina Golden Bears — EHL, 2018–2020. Golden Bears were not listed as a member for the 2020–21 season.
- North Jersey Avalanche — Charter member of AtJHL, 2003–04. Returned to only fielding a team in the Metropolitan Junior Hockey League in 2004.
- Northern Cyclones — AtJHL/EHL, 2004–2017. Joined the USPHL and its National Collegiate Development Conference.
- Philadelphia Junior Flyers — AtJHL/EHL, 2008–2020. Junior Flyers were not listed as fielding a junior team in the EHL in 2020–21.
- Philadelphia Revolution — EHL/EHLP, 2013–2020. Joined from the Eastern Junior Hockey League (EJHL) in 2013; were not listed as fielding a junior team in the EHL or the EPHL in 2020–21.
- Portland Jr. Pirates — AtJHL, 2004–2012. Jr. Pirates organization purchased an Eastern Junior Hockey League franchise and joined the EJHL.
- Protec Jr. Ducks — EHL 2020-2023. Purchased by Flemington Ice Arena and rebranded as the New Jersey Bears. Stay in EHL South Division.
- Seacoast Spartans — EHL, 2019-2024 - moved to USPHL
- Vermont Lumberjacks — EHL, 2014–2025.
- Washington Jr. Nationals — Charter member of AtJHL, 2003–2014. Relocated and became Vermont Lumberjacks.
- Wilkes-Barre/Scranton Knights — AtJHL/EHL, 2010–2015. EHL team went dormant in 2015 after organization joined the NAHL. Returned in 2017 before leaving again for the North American 3 Hockey League in 2019.
- Worcester Jr. Railers - EHL, 2019-2024 - moved to USPHL

== Championships ==
=== EHL (formerly AtJHL/EHL-Premier) ===
Season	Regular season	Playoff	National Tournament result
AtJHL
2003–04	Hartford Jr. Wolfpack	Washington Jr. Nationals	
2004–05	Boston Bulldogs	Boston Bulldogs	
2005–06	New York Bobcats	New York Bobcats	
2006–07	New York Bobcats	New York Bobcats	New York Bobcats lost Semifinal game vs. New Hampshire Jr. Monarchs (EJHL); Northern Cyclones lost Semifinal game vs. Bay State Breakers (EJHL)
2007–08	New Jersey Rockets; Portland Jr. Pirates	Northern Cyclones	Northern Cyclones lost Semifinal game vs. New Hampshire Jr. Monarchs (EJHL); New Jersey Rockets eliminated in Round Robin
2008–09	Northern Cyclones	Northern Cyclones	Northern Cyclones and New York Bobcats eliminated in Round Robin
2009–10	Northern Cyclones	Walpole Express	Walpole Express and New York Bobcats eliminated in Round Robin
2010–11	Walpole Express	Walpole Express	Walpole Express lost Semifinal game vs. Helena Bighorns (NorPac); Northern Cyclones eliminated in Round Robin
2011–12	Walpole Express	Walpole Express	No representatives sent to nationals
2012–13	Northern Cyclones	Wilkes-Barre/Scranton Knights	No representatives sent to nationals
EHL Premier
2013–14	New Hampshire Jr. Monarchs	Northern Cyclones	Northern Cyclones lost Semifinal game vs. North Iowa Bulls (NA3HL); New Hampshire Jr. Monarchs eliminated in Round Robin
2014–15	Philadelphia Little Flyers	Connecticut Oilers	Northern Cyclones lost Div. 1 Championship game vs. North Iowa Bulls (NA3HL)
2015–16	Philadelphia Little Flyers	New Hampshire Jr. Monarchs	Tier III National Tournament not held
2016–17	Philadelphia Little Flyers	Philadelphia Junior Flyers	
EHL
2017–18	Philadelphia Revolution	New Hampshire Avalanche	Tier III National Tournament not held
2018–19	Philadelphia Little Flyers	New Hampshire Avalanche	
2019–20	Boston Junior Rangers	Postseason cancelled due to COVID-19 pandemic	
2020–21	New Jersey 87's	Boston Junior Rangers	
2021–22	Boston Junior Rangers	New Jersey 87's	
2022–23	New Hampshire Avalanche	Boston Junior Rangers	No longer a member of USA Hockey
2023–24	Railers Junior HC	Railers Junior HC	No longer a member of USA Hockey
2024–25	New Hampshire Avalanche	New Jersey 87's	No longer a member of USA Hockey

=== EHLP (formerly 19U Elite) ===
Season	Regular season	Playoff
EHL-19U Elite
2015–16	New Hampshire Jr. Monarchs	Boston Jr. Rangers
2016–17	Vermont Lumberjacks	Philadelphia Revolution
EHLP
2017–18	Boston Jr. Rangers	Boston Jr. Rangers
2018–19	Boston Jr. Rangers	New England Wolves
2019–20	Boston Jr. Rangers	Postseason cancelled due to COVID-19 pandemic
2020–21	New Hampshire Avalanche	New Jersey 87's
2021–22	New Hampshire Avalanche	Boston Jr. Rangers
2022–23	Boston Jr. Rangers	New Jersey 87's
2023–24	Railers Junior HC	Railers Junior HC
2024–25	New England Wolves	New Jersey 87's

== See also ==
- List of ice hockey leagues
