= Ice hockey in the United States =

- The Pittsburgh Penguins and the Washington Capitals compete in the National Hockey League's (NHL) 2017 Stanley Cup playoffs in the nation’s capital, Washington, D.C.
- Country: United States
- Governing body: USA Hockey
- National teams: Men's national team Women's national team
- First played: 1894

Club competitions
- List: Men's: National Hockey League (Major League) American Hockey League (first tier Minor League) ECHL (second tier Minor League) Federal Prospects Hockey League (third tier Minor League) Southern Professional Hockey League (third tier Minor League) Women's: Professional Women's Hockey League

International competitions
- IIHF World Championships; Winter Olympics; World Cup; IIHF Women's World Championship

Ice hockey, referred to in the US simply as "hockey", is a popular sport in the United States. Hockey in the US began in 1894 when the first artificial ice rink was built in Baltimore, Maryland. Now hockey is most popular in regions of the US with cold winter climates, such as the Northeast and the Midwestern. However, since the 1990s, ice hockey has become increasingly popular in the Sun Belt due in large part to the expansion of the National Hockey League to the southeast and southwest US, coupled with the mass relocation of many residents from northern cities with strong hockey support to these Sun Belt locations.

== History of ice hockey in the United States ==
The contemporary sport of ice hockey was developed in Canada, most notably in Montreal, Quebec, where the first indoor hockey game was played on March 3, 1875. Some characteristics of that game, such as the length of the ice rink and the use of a puck, have been retained to this day. The game soon spread south through Canadian immigrants, who played the stick and ball game referred to as "shinny" on frozen ponds and lakes in the winter. The first organized game of this precursor to modern ice hockey in the United States was on November 17, 1883 on the Lower School Pond of St. Paul's School in Concord, NH. The first known formal game of ice hockey in the United States was subsequently played between Yale University and Johns Hopkins University in 1893, and is generally considered to be the start of present-day ice hockey in the nation.

In 1894, the first artificial ice rink was built in Maryland. The rink was called the North Avenue Ice Palace, which was located in Baltimore, Maryland. A few years later, in 1896, the first ice hockey league in the United States was formed called The US Amateur Hockey League. It was founded in New York City around the same time as the second artificial ice rink was opened in New York, New York, called the St. Nicholas Arena. The US Amateur Hockey League then became a member of the International Professional Hockey League in 1904. There were five teams from the United States and Ontario that formed the International Ice Hockey Federation. This league only lasted three seasons but it was the first professional ice hockey league that the United States participated in.

By 1898 the following leagues had already formed: the Amateur Hockey League of New York, the Amateur Hockey Association of Canada, and the Ontario Hockey Association. The 1898 Spalding Athletic Library book includes rules (laws) and results for each league (association).

Meanwhile, teams in western Canada formed the Pacific Coast Hockey Association in 1911. This league created new designs and rules that helped ice hockey evolve into the game it is today. Some of these new innovations that were created were blue lines that were painted under the ice which divided the ice into three sections, goaltenders are allowed to fall and slide on the ice to help prevent the other team from scoring a goal, forward passing is permitted in the neutral zone, and the game was split into three periods of 20 minutes.

== National Hockey League ==
The NHL is the major professional hockey league in North America, with 25 US-based teams and 7 Canadian-based teams competing for the Stanley Cup. While NHL stars are still not as readily familiar to the general American public as are stars of the NFL, MLB, and the NBA, average attendance for NHL games in the US has surpassed average NBA attendance in recent seasons, buoyed in part by the NHL Winter Classic being played in large outdoor stadiums.

In 1924, the Boston Bruins were the first American team to join the National Hockey League. During that season, the first NHL game was played in the United States where the Boston Bruins defeated the Montreal Maroons 2–1. That same season, the NHL increased the season schedule from 24 games to 30 games. Three more American teams the New York Rangers, Chicago Black Hawks and Detroit Cougars, joined the NHL in the year 1926. That same year, the Western Hockey League fell apart and sold most of its players to the new NHL teams. This makes the NHL the top hockey league in North America. In 1942, the Brooklyn Americans withdrew from the NHL. This left the Canadiens, Maple Leafs, Red Wings, Bruins, Rangers, and Black Hawks as the only teams left in the NHL for the next 25 years. Those six teams are now called "the Original Six."

New Brunswick-born skater Willie O'Ree became the first black ice hockey player in the NHL for the Boston Bruins. while Val James was the first African American player to compete in the NHL for the Buffalo Sabres and Toronto Maple Leafs.

In 1972 the World Hockey Association formed of 12 teams from Canada and the United States intended to rival the NHL but ultimately failed and many of the teams merged with the NHL.

== Stanley Cup ==
The Stanley Cup is the oldest trophy in North American sports. Lord Stanley of Preston was appointed by Queen Victoria to be the Governor General of Canada on June 11, 1888. While governor, Ice hockey was still just forming in Canada. He first got to see the game of hockey played at Montreal's 1889 Winter Carnival. During the carnival he watched the Montreal Victorias play the Montreal Hockey Club. Since then he and his family became very involved in the game of ice hockey. His two sons, Arthur and Algernon, convinced their father to donate a trophy that would be considered to be a visible sign of the ice hockey championship. This trophy was a silver bowl inlaid with gold. The trophy was first presented in 1893 and was called the Dominion Hockey Challenge Cup. The name of the trophy was later changed to the famous name, the Stanley Cup.

In 1914 the Portland Rosebuds, an American-based team, joined the Pacific Coast Hockey Association. After that, the trustees of the Stanley Cup made a statement that the Stanley Cup was no longer for the best team in Canada, but now the best team in the whole world. The Rosebuds became the first American team to compete in the Stanley Cup Finals two years later. In the year 1917, the team Seattle Metropolitans was the first American team to win the Stanley Cup. Once that season was over, the National Hockey Association was changed into the NHL or the National Hockey League.

== Minor leagues ==
Minor league professional hockey leagues in the US include the American Hockey League and the ECHL. USA Hockey is the official governing body for amateur hockey in the US The United States Hockey Hall of Fame is located in Eveleth, Minnesota.

== Ice hockey structure ==
The United States ice hockey structure includes elements from traditional American scholastic high school and college athletics, affiliated and independent minor leagues, and the unique "Major Junior" leagues. The hierarchy of the ice hockey league system forms a pyramid with a large number of regional minor and development leagues making up the base of the pyramid and a linear progression through the professional minor leagues leading to the National Hockey League at the top of the pyramid.

== Amateur ice hockey ==
Nine US-based teams compete in the three member leagues of the Canadian Hockey League.

College hockey has a regional following in the northeastern and upper midwestern United States. However in the 2015 season, the Arizona State hockey program made its jump from club to the varsity level. College hockey is increasingly being used to develop players for the NHL and other professional leagues (the US has junior leagues, the United States Hockey League and North American Hockey League, but they are more restricted to protect junior players' college eligibility). The Frozen Four is college hockey's national championship.

Summer senior ice hockey is increasing in popularity in the 21st century, with Edina, Minnesota's Da Beauty League and Buffalo, New York's Fattey Hockey League both drawing NHL players who use the leagues to stay in shape during the offseason. Da Beauty League, established in 2016, is considered the nation's premier summer ice hockey league and benefits from corporate sponsorship from the Minnesota business community. The GLHL is a travel, full-contact league that plays for the Kohlman Cup every year. Teams are all based in Wisconsin and the upper peninsula of Michigan. Several of the teams in the GLHL are the oldest hockey teams in the world, including the Portage Lake Pioneers and Calumet Wolverines, both established in the early 1900s.

== Olympics ==
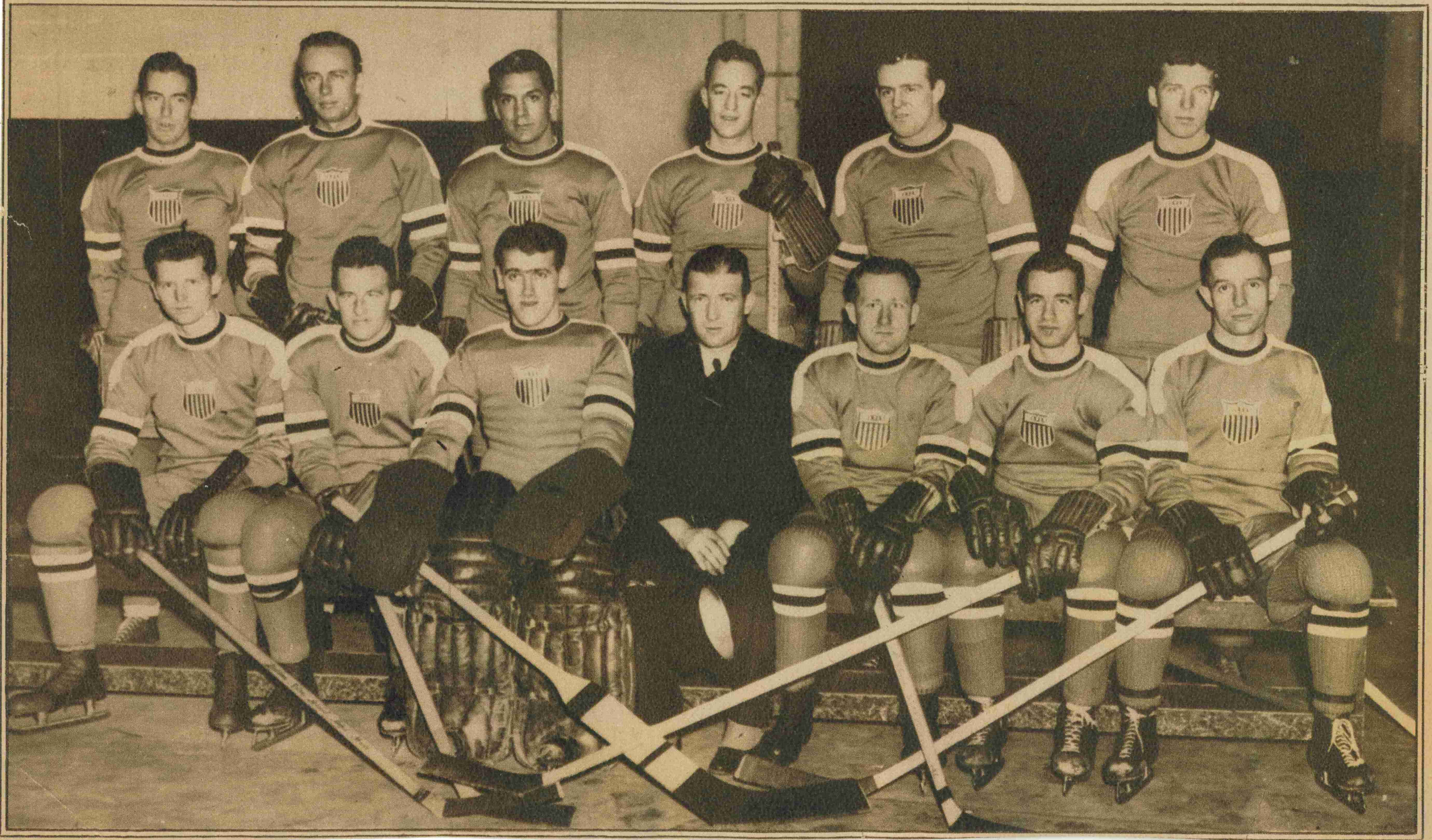
The bronze medal winning 1936 American Olympic team.

A hockey tournament debuted in the Summer Olympics in 1920 and would later also be recognized as the first World Ice Hockey Championship. Canada took the gold medal, with the United States getting the silver. The Canadians went on to claim three consecutive golds after the sport was permanently transferred to the newly established Winter Olympics in 1924. In 1936, their streak was ended by the British team that went on to beat the Canadians and tie the Americans, claiming the gold. Canada reclaimed gold in 1948 and defended it in 1952. However, the Soviet Union ended Canadian dominance in 1956, winning gold, and went on to win all Olympic tournaments until 1992 with 1960 and 1980, when the Americans were victorious, being lone exceptions. Much of this has to do with the fact that, unlike the Soviets, the Canadians were unable to use their best players. After 1992, four nations won gold medals: Canada (7th, 8th, and 9th titles), Sweden (1st and 2nd title), Czech Republic (1st title), Russia (9th title), and, the most recent champions, Finland (1st title). From 1998 to 2014, NHL players participated in the Olympics. In all other years players from all professional leagues except the NHL and AHL competed. Prior to 1947 there was no nationally recognized national governing body for ice hockey in the United States. The Amateur Hockey Association of the United States or AHAUS, which later became USA Hockey, was created that year and has remained the governing body of ice hockey in the United States since then. The United States men's team has won three gold medals (1960, 1980, 2026), eight silver medals (1920, 1924, 1932, 1952, 1956, 1972, 2002, 2010) and one bronze medal (1936). The 1980 gold medal victory is still remembered as one of the greatest upsets in sporting history, with team USA beating four-time defending champions the USSR in the medal round.

On the women's side, the US national team won the first Olympic tournament featuring women in 1998. The Americans won gold again in 2018 and 2026, and have played in every Olympic final except for one, in 2006, when they received bronze. As such, they have claimed four silver medals.

== Women's ice hockey ==
Women's ice hockey is growing in the United States. The Premier Hockey Federation (PHF), founded in 2015 as the National Women's Hockey League, was the first in North America to pay its players a salary, and at its foundation featured four teams from the Northeast. Through partnerships with NHL teams, the league expanded to five teams for its fourth season in 2018, adding the Minnesota Whitecaps (a long-established independent team) that year, before expanding into Canada in 2020. However, after the dissolution of the Canadian Women's Hockey League in 2019, hundreds of prominent women's players, including several American Olympians, founded the Professional Women's Hockey Players' Association and opted to boycott existing leagues in pursuit of a unified, financially stable professional league. In 2023, the PHF was purchased and ultimately dissolved as part of the foundation of the Professional Women's Hockey League (PWHL), the unified league many players had been working towards. The league debuted in January 2024, with three of its six charter franchises located in the US in Boston, New York, and Minnesota.

== Television coverage ==
In 1957, CBS was the first US television network to carry NHL games. Later, the television network NBC also started carrying some NHL games. Both television networks held rights to show NHL games at times, but neither television network showed a full NHL schedule. They only carried select games from the Stanley Cup Finals. From the year 1971 to the year 1995 no United States television network had exclusive coverage of the NHL games. The USA television network started carrying 35 regular-season games and played the full schedule of the playoff games from the year 1981 to 1985. ESPN replaced the USA network in 1985 and then Sports Channel replaced ESPN in 1989. ESPN came back and later took over the NHL contract in 1993. The Fox network joined ESPN in the year 1995. After the 1999 season, ABC, a sister network of ESPN, took over as the NHL's over-the-air broadcast partner in the US, a role it held until 2004. Following the 2004–05 lockout, the NHL signed a new television contract with NBC, initially with co-existing cable TV rights with OLN/Versus. In 2011, NBC and the NHL signed a new 10-year deal, and shortly after, Versus was rebranded into NBCSN following NBC's merger with Comcast. The new deal also made available all televised playoff games on a national basis, with NBC's sister networks such as CNBC and the USA Network broadcasting a limited number of playoff games. Following the 2021 season, the NHL elected to split American TV rights, with ESPN and new partner TNT inking new seven-year contracts. This deal also allows all Stanley Cup Finals games to air on over-the-air television (in this case ABC), though only on even-numbered seasons.

== Pop culture ==
Movies such as Miracle, The Mighty Ducks, Youngblood, Soul on Ice, and Goon (film) have become part of American culture regarding hockey.

== Fanbase ==
Ice hockey is one of the 4 major sports watched in the United States, and the US-based National Hockey League is watched by many people around the world.

Ice hockey is traditionally popular in the Northeastern and Midwestern United States, particularly in Massachusetts (and New England in general), Michigan, Upstate New York and Minnesota. Minnesota is known as the State of Hockey and the Minneapolis–Saint Paul metropolitan area is the hockey capital of the US.

The NHL has also made inroads into other areas of the US not historically known for hockey. Teams based in North Carolina, Tennessee, Florida, Texas, Arizona, Nevada, and California have all contributed to an increase in the sport's popularity in those states, with Dallas, Tampa Bay, Carolina (based in Raleigh), Anaheim, Los Angeles, Vegas, and Florida (based near Miami) all winning the Stanley Cup at least once each since 1999.

The NHL is trying to grow the sport of ice hockey by attempting to diversify the fanbase and expand from its traditional demographic. A notable example is the Chicago Blackhawks, who have seen a significant increase in attention from ethnic minorities since their Stanley Cup successes in the 2010s, which has resulted in the team setting up outreach programs for urban youths and low income neighborhoods. The Washington Capitals also have noteworthy outreach programs for to garner interest ice hockey.

The NHL has outreach programs like "Hockey is for Everyone" to make ice hockey more accessible to urban youth and low income communities.

== Present day ==
As of the year 2015, there are over 2,000 ice rinks in the United States alone (United States, 2008). There are now 32 teams participating in the NHL, with 25 in the United States and 7 in Canada. As of spring 2014, the United States has won 16 Olympic medals (gold, silver, and bronze) total.

The US now has more youth hockey players than all other countries, excluding Canada, combined. The legacy of the Miracle on Ice is believed to be influential in popularizing the sport from a regional sport to a mainstream sport.

== Number of registered players by state ==
Number of registered hockey players, including male, female and junior, according to USA Hockey.

State	Players	% of population
Minnesota	59,457	1.019%
New York	46,264	0.231%
Massachusetts	45,276	0.628%
Michigan	40,738	0.399%
California	31,933	0.081%
Pennsylvania	28,036	0.213%
Illinois	26,353	0.206%
Florida	22,888	0.096%
Wisconsin	22,277	0.372%
Colorado	18,593	0.309%
Ohio	18,344	0.154%
New Jersey	17,823	0.185%
Texas	17,346	0.054%
Washington	12,993	0.161%
Connecticut	12,338	0.333%
Missouri	11,521	0.183%
Virginia	11,085	0.125%
Maryland	9,929	0.157%
Arizona	9,534	0.124%
Alaska	9,201	1.237%
North Carolina	8,698	0.078%
North Dakota	7,272	0.904%
Maine	6,674	0.473%
Indiana	6,475	0.093%
Montana	6,065	0.531%
Utah	5,618	0.158%
New Hampshire	5,603	0.396%
Nevada	5,305	0.16%
Tennessee	5,187	0.071%
Idaho	4,778	0.235%
Vermont	4,209	0.649%
Rhode Island	3,537	0.315%
Iowa	3,517	0.108%
South Carolina	3,370	0.061%
South Dakota	3,034	0.326%
Oregon	2,995	0.07%
(Georgia (U.S. state)) Georgia	2,600	0.023%
Alabama	2,319	0.045%
Nebraska	2,244	0.111%
Wyoming	2,155	0.365%
Kansas	2,103	0.07%
Kentucky	2,044	0.044%
Oklahoma	1,616	0.039%
New Mexico	1,472	0.069%
(Washington, D.C.) District of Columbia	1,208	0.174%
Delaware	983	0.092%
West Virginia	936	0.053%
Hawaii	450	0.031%
Louisiana	369	0.008%
Arkansas	364	0.012%
Mississippi	272	0.009%

== Players by Birth State 2025 - 26 Season ==
The following lists present U.S.-born hockey players ranked by state of birth. Totals reflect birthplace only and do not include players who relocated to other states for high school hockey or for participation in boarding schools, prep programs, or AAA teams. For example, T. J. Oshie,, who was born in Washington State but played high school hockey in Warroad, Minnesota, and Jack Johnson, who was born in Indiana and attended Shattuck-Saint Mary's in Faribault, Minnesota, are attributed to their respective birth states and are not included in Minnesota’s player totals.

=== National Hockey League ===
As of March 2026, there are 292 US-born hockey players representing 32 states in the National Hockey League (NHL).

Rank	State	Total
1	Minnesota	50
2	Michigan	39
3	New York	31
4	Massachusetts	29
5	Illinois	19

=== Professional Women's Hockey League (PWHL) ===
There are currently 75 U.S.-born hockey players representing 17 states in the Professional Women's Hockey League (PWHL) with nearly half (37) having played either high school or prep / academy hockey in Minnesota. Twenty-three (23) players were born, raised, and played high school hockey in the Minneapolis–St. Paul metropolitan area, 3 players moved to the Twin Cities area and played high school hockey, and 11 current players moved to the state to play for Shattuck-Saint Mary's.

Rank	State	Total
1	Minnesota	23
2	New York	12
3	Illinois	7
3	Massachusetts	7
3	Michigan	7

=== American Hockey League ===
The American Hockey League (AHL) is a professional ice hockey league based in Springfield, Massachusetts. It is considered the primary developmental league for the National Hockey League (NHL). The league currently has 379 US-born players.

Rank	State	Total
1	Minnesota	63
2	Michigan	62
3	Massachusetts	36
4	New York	32
5	Illinois	29

=== NCAA Division I Men's Hockey ===
Division I men's ice hockey consists of 64 schools. Minnesota produces more NCAA Division I players than any other U.S. state or Canadian province.

Rank	State	Total
1	Minnesota	211
2	New York	96
3	Michigan	88
4	Massachusetts	85
5	Illinois	65

=== United States Hockey League ===
The United States Hockey League (USHL) is the top junior ice hockey league in the United States. The league consists of 16 teams throughout the Midwestern United States, for players between the ages of 16 and 21. The USHL is strictly amateur, allowing former players to compete in NCAA college hockey.

Rank	State	Total
1	Minnesota	131
2	Michigan	48
3	Illinois	43
4	New York	39
5	Massachusetts	29

=== North American Hockey League ===
The North American Hockey League (NAHL) is a Tier II junior hockey league headquartered in Addison, Texas. It is the only Tier II junior league sanctioned by USA Hockey, and acts as an alternative for those who would not or did not make the roster of a team in the Major Junior Canadian Hockey League (CHL) nor Tier I United States Hockey League (USHL).

Rank	State	Total
1	Minnesota	200
2	Michigan	97
3	Illinois	90
4	New York	77
5	Massachusetts	70

== See also ==
- Black players in ice hockey
- LGBTQ people in ice hockey
- List of ice hockey leagues#North America
