= Ice hockey in Nebraska =

- Flag of Nebraska
- Country: United States
- Governing body: USA Hockey
- National teams: Men's national team Women's national team
- First played: 1939

Club competitions
- List: NCAA (college) AWHL, NA3HL, NorPac, WSHL (junior)

Nebraska had more failures than success in ice hockey for much of its history. However, since the 1990s the sport has seen a massive amount of growth in the cornhusker state.

== History ==
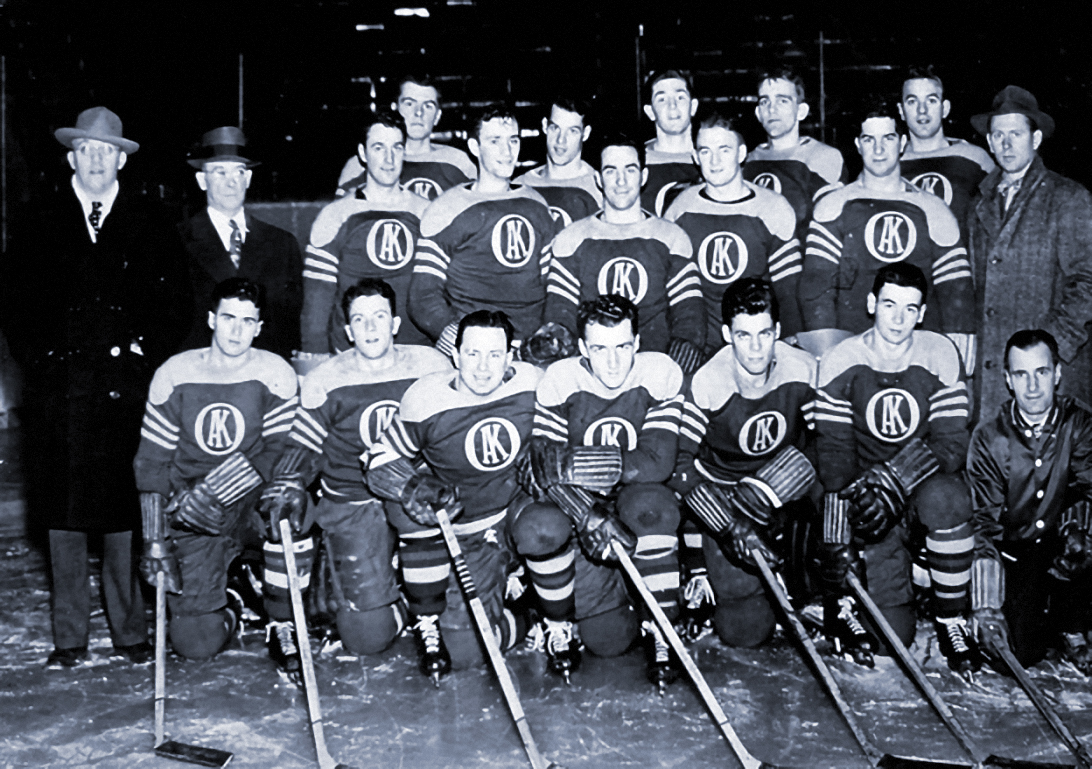
The 1945-46 Omaha Knights with Gordie Howe (2nd from left, back row)

All efforts to start ice hockey in Nebraska were focused in and around Omaha for most of the 20th century. The first real attempt was towards the end of the Great Depression when the Omaha Knights began play as members of the AHA. The Knights were able to play only three seasons before the league ceased operations due to World War II but they did return after the war. When they restarted play in 1945, the Knights sported a then-unknown player by the name of Gordie Howe who would go on to have one of the most storied careers in the history of ice hockey. Omaha would be one of the league's top teams (now renamed the USHL) winning three regular season titles before finally capturing the postseason crown in 1951. Unfortunately, that was the final season for the league and the Knights were disbanded along with the rest of their contemporaries. At the same time the University of Nebraska Omaha had attempted to field a program after World War II but those efforts never surpassed the club level.

After spending most of the 50s without a team, ice hockey returned to Nebraska in the form of a new Omaha Knights franchise. This club played its first season in 1959 and were member of the IHL, a AA-league at the time. The Knights only lasted 4 years before moving eastwards for greener pastures. Not willing to give up on the market so easily, a third Knights franchise was founded the very next season and played in the brand new CPHL. This time the team lasted just two seasons before moving away. After a year without a team, a fourth attempt was made with the Omaha Knights when the Minnesota Rangers relocated in 1966. This iteration of the Knights found much greater success, winning three league championships in 9 seasons. Unfortunately, the team's on-ice success wasn't able to translate into financial security and the Knights withdrew from the league in 1975.

Nebraska was left without any established team for over a decade until the mid-1980s when the state received its first established junior team; the Omaha Lancers. Because the franchise was at the junior level and the players could not be paid a salary if they wanted to retain their college eligibility (the primary reason for the league was to funnel players into the college ranks), the Lancers had a much lower operating budget than the earlier professional teams and were able to establish a foothold in the region more easily. it took the team just 4 years to win their first championship and they reeled off three more titles before the franchise was a decade old. Building upon the triumphs of the Lancers, a second expansion team was added in 1996 when the Lincoln Stars began play. This new franchise wasted no time and won the league title in their inaugural season. A third junior team was added in 2000 when the Twin Cities Vulcans moved to Kearney and became the Tri-City Storm. As of 2023, all three continue to call Nebraska home and each has won the league championship.

While the junior level was flourishing, Nebraska–Omaha was finally able to follow through on their plans to establish a varsity ice hockey program. The team began play in 1997, using the Omaha Civic Auditorium as its first home. Within 2 years they were able to secure a place in the CCHA, vital for the long-term success of a program, and made a surprise run to the league championship in their first season. However, the team was not able to build on that early success and have only once made the conference semifinals since (as of 2023). Despite those shortcoming, the team was able to establish itself in the community. After moving to the CenturyLink Center Omaha in 2003, the school built the first on-campus home in 2015 and the Mavericks continue to play in the Baxter Arena, one of the larger venues in college hockey at a capacity of 7,898.

With the popularity of the sport expanding, pro hockey attempted another revival in the early 21st century when the Calgary Flames moved their dormant AHL franchise to Omaha. The Omaha Ak-Sar-Ben Knights began play in 2005 and won a division title in just their second season. However, both years saw poor attendance figures and the fifth team to possess the 'Knights' moniker picked up stakes after just two seasons.

== Teams ==
=== Professional ===
==== Inactive ====
| Team | City | League | Years active | Fate |
|---|---|---|---|---|
| Omaha Knights | Omaha | AHA; USHL | 1939–1942; 1945–1951 | Defunct |
| Omaha Knights (second) | Omaha | IHL | 1959–1963 | Defunct |
| Omaha Knights (third) | Omaha | CPHL | 1963–1965 | Defunct |
| Omaha Knights (fourth) | Omaha | CHL | 1966–1975 | Defunct |
| Omaha Ak-Sar-Ben Knights | Omaha | AHL | 2005–2007 | Calgary Wranglers |

=== Collegiate ===
==== Active ====
| Team | City | Gender | Division | League | Arena | Founded |
|---|---|---|---|---|---|---|
| Omaha Mavericks | Omaha | Men's | NCAA Division I | NCHC | Baxter Arena | 1997 |

=== Junior ===
==== Active ====
| Team | City | League | Arena | Founded |
|---|---|---|---|---|
| Omaha Lancers | Omaha | USHL | Liberty First Credit Union Arena | 1986 |
| Lincoln Stars | Lincoln | USHL | Ice Box | 1996 |
| Tri-City Storm | Kearney | USHL | Viaero Center | 2000 ^{†} |

† relocated from elsewhere.

=== Timeline ===
Active Active (out of state)

== Players ==
Though Nebraska has had a passing relationship with ice hockey until late, the state has been able to produce a few notable players.

- Rob Harris helped Minnesota win its first national championship in 1974 and was later a member of the Team USA at the 1976 Winter Olympics.
- Jake Guentzel was born in Omaha while his father, Mike, coached the Lancers. When Mike moved to Minnesota to be an assistant for the Gophers, Jake followed and was raised in nearby Woodbury. Jake returned to his home state after graduating high school and played three seasons at Nebraska Omaha before embarking on a professional career. In 2017, he tied the NHL record for most points by a rookie in one playoff with 21.

=== Notable players by city ===
location of cities

==== Lincoln ====
- Rutger McGroarty

==== Omaha ====
- Rob Harris
- Jed Ortmeyer

==== Papillion ====
- Ethen Frank

==== Sidney ====
- Cal McGowan

==== Raised out of state ====
- Jeff Levy
- Jake Guentzel

† relocated from elsewhere.
