= Ice hockey in Kansas =

- Flag of Kansas
- Country: United States
- Governing body: USA Hockey
- National teams: Men's national team Women's national team
- First played: 1980

Club competitions
- List: ECHL (minor professional)

Kansas has a passing relationship with ice hockey in the United States. While there has been an increased presence in the state since the 1980s, Ice hockey remains mostly a curiosity in the Sunflower State.

== History ==
Professional hockey teams had played in Kansas since the 1920s, with teams in the minor American Hockey Association. The Edmonton Oilers chose to place one of their minor league teams in Wichita, inaugurating the Wichita Wind in 1980. While the team made a surprising appearance in the CHL final that season, the team never really caught the eye of the public. After winning a division title in year two, the Wind switch affiliation to the New Jersey Devils and dropped to the bottom of the standings in 1983. With both the team and league in financial difficulty, the Wind moved to Montana the following year and left Kansas without an ice hockey team for almost a decade. Wichita saw the second attempt at expansion into the state with the Wichita Thunder hitting the ice in 1992. The team quickly rose to the top of the Central Hockey League, winning the league championship in both 1994 and 1995. While the team was unable to capture a title afterwards, they still remained a fixture in the community while other franchises attempted to succeed in the plains state.

The sport branched out in 1998 when the Topeka ScareCrows were founded. Hoping to build a local rivalry with the Thunder, the ScareCrows were largely invisible in their three seasons in Kansas. The team made the playoffs twice but never advanced past the first round. After the club folded in 2001, a junior team with the same name was founded and played in the USHL, the top junior league in the country. The second Scarecrows weren't any more successful than the first and they moved away in 2003. A year later, another pro team moved to Topeka and became the Tarantulas. This third team lasted just one season before folding.

Three prior failed attempts didn't stop yet another team from trying to establish a team in Topeka. 2007 saw the introduction of the Topeka RoadRunners but this time the new team was able to get enough support from the locals. The RoadRunners won three division titles in their first four years, and were consistently one of the best teams in the NAHL for a decade. The team's fortunes changed in the late teens but they were still able to survive after being purchased by Lamar Hunt Jr. in 2018. After being rebranded as the 'Pilots', the team was hit hard by the COVID-19 pandemic. Plans to have the team play in Kansas City were shelved and the franchise was mothballed for the entire season and later moved to Texas after Hunt sold the club.

During the RoadRunner's successful stay, two other attempts at founding junior teams in the state were made. The Wichita Jr. Thunder hoped to build in the appeal of the established club and slowly built themselves into a contender. In the club's fifth season, they won the league championship and looked to be well on their way to increasing the footprint of hockey in Wichita. Unfortunately, the team was unable to sustain that success and sunk to the bottom of the standings immediately afterwards. The Jr. Thunder was just 22 games over the next three seasons before the team was forced to shut down for the pandemic. When the league restarted in 2021, Wichita was nowhere to be seen and remain a dormant franchise. A less successful attempt was made in Topeka when the Capitals were founded in 2013. The team lasted just two years before relocating due to an impasse during lease renewal.

Since the early 90's, the Wichita Thunder remain the only team that has been able to survive in Kansas, doing so in spite of the collapse of their original league and a subsequent move to the ECHL.

== Teams ==
=== Professional ===
==== Active ====
Team	City	League	Arena	Founded
Wichita Thunder	Wichita	ECHL	Intrust Bank Arena	1992

* relocated

==== Inactive ====
Team	City	League	Years active	Fate
Wichita Wind	Wichita	CPHL	1980–1983	Defunct
Topeka ScareCrows	Topeka	CHL	1998–2001	Defunct
Topeka Tarantulas	Topeka	CHL	2004–2005	Defunct

=== Junior ===
==== Inactive ====
Team	City	League	Years active	Fate
Topeka ScareCrows (second)	Topeka	USHL	2001–2003	Defunct
Topeka RoadRunners	Topeka	NAHL	2007–2020	Amarillo Wranglers
Wichita Jr. Thunder	Wichita	WSHL	2012–2020	Defunct
Topeka Capitals	Topeka	NA3HL	2013–2015	Atlanta Capitals

=== Timeline ===
Active Active (out of state)

== Players ==
With a low overall population (36th in the US), low engagement (just 0.059% of the population is registered as members of USA Hockey) and little historical impact from the sport, Kansas has produced very few native players. Just one person born in Kansas has achieved any notability in the sport, however, Si Griffis was raised in Western Ontario.

=== Notable players by city ===
==== Raised Elsewhere ====
- Si Griffis
