= Ice hockey in Iowa =

- Flag of Iowa
- Country: United States
- Governing body: USA Hockey
- National teams: Men's national team Women's national team
- First played: 1958

Club competitions
- List: AHL, ECHL (minor professional) NCAA (college) USHL / NAHL / NA3HL (junior)

Iowa has become one of the key regions for junior ice hockey in the United States.

== History ==
Despite being next door to hockey-mad Minnesota, Iowa's relative lack of natural ice surfaces made it difficult for the sport to catch on in the Hawkeye state. The low population density also meant that there were few locales that could support an artificial ice rink. These factors contributed to the state not receiving its first major ice hockey team until the late 1950s. At the time, the United States Central Hockey League, a senior league that operated mostly out of Minnesota, saw many of its previous teams cease operations in 1958. In order to keep the league alive, several new clubs were started, including the Des Moines Ice Hawks. The franchise survived for three years before the league rebranded itself as the United States Hockey League and became a semi-pro circuit. The Ice Hawks changed their names to the Des Moines Oak Leafs and got a big boost when the Des Moines Ice Arena opened its doors in November 1961. The club remained with the USHL for two years before leaving to join the fully professional International Hockey League in 1963. The team had some success over the years, reaching the finals in '65 and '71 but it wasn't until after they changed their named to the Des Moines Capitols that they won a league championship. Success, however, came too late for the team and after one more season they ceased operations.

Meanwhile, the USHL saw potential in Iowa and continued to expand with the addition of the Waterloo Black Hawks in 1962. The Black Hawks were an instant success, winning the league championship in their second season to begin a run of five consecutive titles. The USHL then added the Sioux City Musketeers in 1972 but Waterloo remained at the forefront, adding three more titles in the 70s. In 1979, the USHL was operating as mostly an afterthought behind at least 4 other professional leagues (NHL, AHL, IHL and CHL). In order to keep the league alive, the teams switched from senior hockey to junior hockey. At the time, junior hockey circuits were run almost exclusively out of Canada aside from U.S. high school programs. However, because the major Canadian Hockey League league paid their players a stipend, the NCAA had ruled that participating players were ineligible to play college hockey. The USHL stepped in to fill the void, becoming the first major junior league in the US. After its inaugural season in 1979–80, the league continued its expansion into Iowa with the Black Hawks relocating and becoming the Dubuque Fighting Saints. The Hennepin Nordiques, who had only been around for a year, then moved to Waterloo, taking over the name and ensuring that there was no loss of ice hockey in Black Hawk County. That same year, the USHL returned to the capitol with the Des Moines Buccaneers.

With four team spread across the state, the USHL was now primarily located in Iowa, a situation that became even more noticeable when a team in Wisconsin folded in 1981 and was replaced by the North Iowa Huskies in 1983. While there was a rapid expansion with junior hockey, Iowa was largely ignored by the professional ranks. Because the Capitols had failed to catch on and the Iowa Stars had lasted just one year, no teams were willing to take another gamble in the midwestern state. Unbothered by the lack of professional hockey, the USHL remained the premier league in Iowa and was buoyed by the on-ice success of its many teams. Dubuque and Sioux City combined for four championships in the 1980 but the 90s belonged to the Buccaneers. Des Moines won 3 championships to go with 4 regular season titles. Not everything was successful, however, and the USHL did go through some perturbations around the turn of the century.

1999 saw the Huskies relocate to Cedar Rapids, where they found more success. The Fighting Saints, however, were not so lucky. The team had fallen on hard times in the late 90s and owner, Brian Gallagher, decided to relocate to Oklahoma in 2001. The move did not pan out and the team lasted just one more season before disbanding. Dubuque would not be without a team for long as the Dubuque Thunderbirds began play in 2001. Though they played at a lower level than the USHL, the team was an unqualified success. The Thunderbirds won four championships in two leagues during their 9-year existence but, critically, they had a massive amount of fan support. In their final three years, the team drew over 32,000 in total attendance which accounted for about 40% of the Central States Hockey League's figures. The sizable crowds convinced the city to build a new rink and began construction of the Mystique Ice Center in 2009. The following season the Thunderbirds ceased operations, bowing out in favor of the second Dubuque Fighting Saints franchise and the return of major junior hockey. The team announced its appearance by winning the league championship in its inaugural season and followed that with a second two years later.

With junior hockey proving to be such a success in Iowa, professional hockey did eventually return when the Dallas Stars placed their AHL affiliate to Des Moines in 2005. The arrangement lasted three years before the Stars ended their affiliation, citing travel costs. The team then came under the purview of the Anaheim Ducks and was renamed "Iowa Chops". After the season, the team was suspended by the AHL for violating league by-laws by being used as collateral for a loan. After losing their affiliation with the Ducks, the team was sold to the Dallas Stars and relocated to Texas.

Iowa was left without pro hockey for four years until the Minnesota Wild relocated their main affiliate to the region. The Iowa Wild played their first game in 2013 and played in the same building as the Stars/Chops (Casey's Center). While the team has not seen much on-ice success, the Wild consistently draw crowds of 6,000 or more to their games. The stability of the state's hockey franchises eventually led to the ECHL's arrival in 2021 when the Iowa Heartlanders were introduced. The state received its first college hockey program in 2023 due in part to unfortunate circumstances at another university. Due to financial problems, Finlandia University was forced to close after the 2022–23 academic year. The athletic department was able to make an arrangement with the University of Dubuque to absorb both its men's and women's ice hockey programs with most of its players transferring in the process.

== Teams ==
=== Professional ===
==== Active ====
Team	City	League	Arena	Founded
Iowa Wild	Des Moines	AHL	Casey's Center	2013 ^{†}
Iowa Heartlanders	Coralville	ECHL	Xtream Arena	2021

==== Inactive ====
Team	City	League	Years active	Fate
Des Moines Ice Hawks	Des Moines	USCHL	1958–1961	Des Moines Oak Leafs
Des Moines Oak Leafs	Des Moines	USHL; IHL	1961–1963; 1963–1972	Des Moines Capitols
Iowa Stars	Des Moines	CHL	1969–1970	Defunct
Des Moines Capitols	Des Moines	IHL	1972–1975	Defunct
Iowa Stars (second)	Des Moines	AHL	2005–2008	Iowa Chops
Iowa Chops	Des Moines	AHL	2008–2009	Texas Stars

=== Collegiate ===
==== Active ====
Team	City	Gender	Division	League	Arena	Founded
Dubuque	Dubuque	Men's	NCAA Division III	NCHA	Mystique Ice Center	2023
Dubuque	Dubuque	Women's	NCAA Division III	NCHA	Mystique Ice Center	2023
Iowa Hawkeyes	Coralville	Men's	ACHA Division II (Club)	MACHA	BodyArmour Ice Arena	1974
Iowa State Cyclones	Ames	Men's	ACHA Division I (Club)	MCH	Ames/ISU Ice Arena	1967
Iowa State Cyclones	Ames	Womens	ACHA Division II (Club)	MCH	Ames/ISU Ice Arena	2014

=== Junior ===
==== Active ====
Team	City	League	Arena	Founded
Sioux City Musketeers	Sioux City	USHL	Tyson Events Center	1972 ^{‡}
Waterloo Black Hawks (second)	Waterloo	USHL	Young Arena	1980 ^{†}
Des Moines Buccaneers	Urbandale	USHL	Buccaneer Arena	1980
Cedar Rapids RoughRiders	Cedar Rapids	USHL	ImOn Ice Arena	1999 ^{†}
Dubuque Fighting Saints (second)	Dubuque	USHL	Mystique Ice Center	2010
Mason City Toros	Mason City	NA3HL	Mason City Multipurpose Arena	2011 ^{†}
North Iowa Bulls	Mason City	NAHL	Mason City Multipurpose Arena	2021 ^{†}

==== Inactive ====
Team	City	League	Years active	Fate
Waterloo Black Hawks	Waterloo	USHL	1962–1980 ^{‡}	Dubuque Fighting Saints
Dubuque Fighting Saints	Dubuque	USHL	1980–2001 ^{†}	Defunct
North Iowa Huskies	Mason City	USHL	1983–1999	Cedar Rapids RoughRiders
Dubuque Thunderbirds	Dubuque	MnJHL; CSHL	2001–2006; 2006–2010	Defunct

† Relocated from elsewhere.
‡ Started as a semi-professional team.

=== Timeline ===
Active Active (out of state)

== Players ==
The existence of several junior teams across the state has given many communities access to local rinks and allowed the state to produce several players of note. Despite this, Iowa still has a relatively low level of engagement with the sport as less than 4,000 residents were registered with USA Hockey in 2022.

=== Notable players by city ===
location of cities

==== Des Moines ====
- Scott Clemmensen
- C. J. Smith

==== Dubuque ====
- Dominique Kremer

==== Waterloo ====
- Walt Kyle
- Cal Petersen

==== Raised elsewhere ====
- Tucker Poolman

† relocated from elsewhere.
