= Ice hockey in the District of Columbia =

- Flag of the District of Columbia
- Country: United States
- Governing body: USA Hockey
- National teams: Men's national team Women's national team
- First played: 1948

Club competitions
- List: NHL (major professional)

The District of Columbia has a small but expanding relationship with ice hockey in the United States. With the Washington Capitals serving as the flagship franchise in the region, ice hockey has seen steady growth in the Washington, D.C. area.

== History ==
Due to its modest winters, ice hockey was a relative unknown in D.C. until the opening of Riverside Stadium in 1938. While it was not primarily an ice rink the multi-purpose arena could be flooded for that purpose. That enabled Georgetown to found a varsity ice hockey team the following season. 1939 also saw the city get its first professional team when the Washington Eagles joined the Eastern Hockey League. Two years later the Uline Arena was completed and the new building served as the home for the Washington Lions. Competition between the Eagles and Lions was fierce in 1942 but eventually the new club won out and the Eagles folded. Compounding problems was the entry of the US into World War II and that caused both the Hoyas and the Lions to suspend operations for the duration.

The Hoyas returned in 1946 but it was another year before the reappearance of the Lions. The late return did no favors to the team and Washington finished dead-last in league standings in back-to-back campaigns. To make matters worse, the Lions operated as an independent club in and did not have a parent team to help bail them out of their dire financial situation. After the Lions announced that they were ceasing operations in 1949, the Uline arena changed its policies and no longer allowed ice hockey games to be played. The loss of the venue forced Georgetown to suspend its ice hockey team, leaving the region without an active ice hockey club.

The changes didn't last and a second Washington Lions franchise was started in 1951. They returned to the Uline arena, however, Georgetown didn't try to restart its program at the time. The Lions played for five seasons, pausing briefly when the Eastern Hockey League went dark in 1953–54, but were only able to achieve a modest level of success. After the franchise was bought by Harry Glynne III, and Jerry DeLise, the club changed its name to the 'Washington Presidents' and played for another three seasons before stopping for good.

In June 1972, the NHL announce that Washington was one of two cities that would receive an expansion team in 1974. Abe Pollin, the owner of the Washington Bullets, announce his plan to build a new arena in nearby Landover, Maryland that would open in time for the Washington Capitals' first season. The team debuted at the Capital Centre in October 1974 and kicked of the worst season in the history of the NHL. Washington was just 8 of its 80 games that season and the club would not produce a winning record for nine seasons. Fortunately, Pollin was able to keep the team's head above water during their early struggles. Whereas many other new teams were forced to move to new locales, The Capitals remained in the D.C. area and became one of the leagues better teams in the 1980s. While Washington was able to achieve regular season success, playoff wins eluded the franchise. Washington made the postseason every year from 1983 through 1996 but only once advanced past the second round, often losing to lower-seeded teams. Despite a surprise run to the 1998 Stanley Cup Final, the Capitals were not a hot ticket by the end of the 20th century and the team was bought by Ted Leonsis.

New ownership brought about new management and the team brought in several big name players, chief among them was 5-time scoring champion Jaromír Jágr. The changes did not bear fruit and by 2004 the team traded most of its players in order to undergo a rebuild. That summer, Washington won the draft lottery, enabling them to select Alexander Ovechkin with the first selection. The arrival of Ovechkin brought about a sea change as his battles with Sidney Crosby (who was on Washington's chief rival, Pittsburgh Penguins) generated a renewed interest in both the team and the game. Since 2005, interest in the sport has flourished in the region, culminating with the franchise's first championship in 2018.

== Teams ==
=== Professional ===
==== Active ====
Team	City	League	Arena	Founded
Washington Capitals	Washington, D.C.	NHL	Capital One Arena	1974

* relocated

==== Inactive ====
Team	City	League	Years active	Fate
Washington Eagles	Washington, D.C.	EAHL	1939–1942	Defunct
Washington Lions	Washington, D.C.	AHL	1941–1943, 1947–1949	Defunct
Washington Lions (second)	Washington, D.C.	EHL	1951–1953, 1954–1957	Defunct
Washington Presidents	Washington, D.C.	EHL	1957–1960	Defunct

=== Collegiate ===
==== Inactive ====
Team	City	Gender	Division	League	Years active
Georgetown Hoyas	Washington, D.C.	Men's	None (pre classification)	Independent	1939–1942, 1946–1949

=== Timeline ===
Active Active (out of state)

== Players ==
location of Washington D.C.

Washington D.C. has seen a few of its locals achieve notability in the sport. However, because of the city small footprint, nearby regions in Maryland and Virginia a usually included when discussing the impact of the sport on the region. Of those players who are from D.C. proper, about as many were raised elsewhere as inside the borders of the district.

=== Notable players by city ===
==== Washington D.C. ====
- Dylan Hunter ^{†}
- Stephen Werner

==== Raised out of the district ====
- Kevyn Adams
- Bill Nyrop
- Emma Terho

† Moved from elsewhere
