= Ice hockey in Alabama =

- Flag of Alabama
- Country: United States
- Governing body: USA Hockey
- National teams: Men's national team Women's national team
- First played: 1976

Club competitions
- List: ECHL (minor professional)

Alabama has a checkered history with ice hockey in the United States. Like many states of the Deep South hockey did not arrive in any organized fashion for many years and, when it did, the sport had a hard time establishing itself in the Gulf Coast states.

== History ==
The earliest appearance of ice hockey in the state occurred in Birmingham when the Toronto Toros moved to become the Birmingham Bulls. The team played for another three seasons in the World Hockey Association before the league was forced to fold. During the NHL–WHA merger, the Bulls had hopes that they would be accepted into the NHL, however, no proposals that included Birmingham were ever seriously considered by the NHL. Knowing that they would not join the major leagues, Birmingham searched for a different home and managed to secure a spot in the Central Hockey League, a top-tier minor league. The team was unable to adjust to their new circumstances and began experiencing financial difficulties. The Bulls were forced to suspend operations mid-way through the 1980–81 season.

The state wasn't without a team for long as two successive attempts were made to bring hockey back to Birmingham. However, neither the Birmingham South Stars nor the second Birmingham Bulls lasted more than a year. Instead it was the University of Alabama in Huntsville that proved to be the savior of ice hockey in Alabama. Due in part to the number of out-of-state personnel who worked in the area as aerospace and defense industries, Huntsville had an appetite for the sport and fielded a club team as far back as the late 1970s. The team at Huntsville was so popular that the school decided to promote it to varsity status in 1985 and, just two years later, it was such a welcome spectacle that Governor George Wallace declared Huntsville to be the "Hockey Capital of the South" in 1987.

In spite of their difficulties scheduling opponents and the cost of running a program so far away from any of their opponents (their closest contemporaries were hundreds of miles away), Alabama Huntsville quickly became a player on the national stage and appeared in the 1992 Division II national championship. Two years later the team became just the fifth program to complete a season with an undefeated record since World War II and was only the second (after Cornell in 1970 and Bemidji State in 1984) to win a national title in the process. After a second championship in 1998, Huntsville raised their program to Division I but found themselves mired in mediocrity. The Chargers had a few good years but were mostly relegated to the lower levels. Even when the team won their league championship and made the NCAA tournament, they did so with losing records and lost both games. After the collapse of the men's division of College Hockey America in 2010, UAH was forced to play as an independent for three seasons.

In 2013 the major conference realignment enabled the Chargers to join the WCHA but the team had lost all of its momentum in the interim. Over an 8-year span, Alabama Huntsville never finished better than 7th in the conference and posted losing records every year. The team never came close to finishing any season with an even record and slipped further from the thoughts of even the local sports fans. By 2020, the COVID-19 pandemic his an already reeling program and the school announced that the team could not continue unless it received $750,000 in donations. It took less than a week for the funds to be raised, however, The school's distance from the rest of their conference opponents led to UAH facing another existential threat. In 2021, the bulk of WCHA teams decided to leave the conference and reform as the CCHA. The primary reason for this was to reduce the travel costs as the conference had members in Alaska and Alabama while seven of its members were situated around the Great Lakes. Alabama Huntsville applied for membership in the CCHA, hoping to convince the other teams to keep the Chargers as members but their petition was eventually denied. Once their last appeal went for naught, UAH announced that the program would be ceasing operations but, because enough funding had been secured in the interim, the program would be reinstated as soon as they could find a conference to accept the program.

During the heyday of the UAH Chargers, several attempts at establishing minor league hockey were made. In 1992, a team relocated to Birmingham and became the second Bulls franchise. Art Clarkson, the owner of the Birmingham Barons, brought the team from Cincinnati and the next year had a local rival when the Huntsville Blast arrived from Virginia. The two teams played one another in the first round of the ECHL playoffs that year but their rivalry was short-lived. Huntsville moved out of state after the year, leaving Birmingham as the only professional team in the state. A year later, however, that situation was remedied when the Mobile Mysticks were founded. The Mysticks had some success but began to see falling attendance almost immediately. The team stated with an average of more than 5,300 in their first season but average attendance fell every year afterwards save one. Going 0–7 in their first three playoff series didn't help matter and by the time the 21st century rolled around Mobile was getting less than 3,500 per game. The bottom fell out in 2002 with an average of about 2,600 and, with the team failing to make the postseason, the franchise suspended operations after the year.

Starting the same year as the Mysticks, the Huntsville Channel Cats were founding members of the SHL, winning the inaugural league championship. When the league folded after the year, Huntsville had enough of a presence to continue and joined the CHL. The team was one of the top teams in the league over the next few years and won their second championship in 1999. The late 90s saw a change in ownership for both Birmingham and Huntsville; Clarkson sold the Bulls in 1997 and the team soon became a laughingstock. In 2000, the team lost 18 in a stretch of 20 games and were forced to forfeit several games for using ineligible players. Diminishing attendance eventually forced Charles Felix to sell the team to George Shinn, owner of the Charlotte Hornets, and the team was moved to New Jersey. Huntsville, meanwhile, was sold to John Cherney after their second championship and one of his first orders of business was to chance the team's name. Entering the '01 season, the team was rechristened the 'Tornado' but instead of engendering support, all the new name did was rankle fans. Many were survivors of the 1989 tornado that had killed 21 residents and were unhappy with the rebranding. Compounding matters was the departure of many fan-favorite players while the team had its worst on-ice performance since its inaugural season. The Tornado lasted just one season before leaving the CHL amid Cherney's threat to move out of the Von Braun Center if he did not get better game dates. After two years away, the team resurfaced with the old Channel Cats name as members of the new South East Hockey League. Huntsville won the regular season and playoff championship but the league folded after the season.

That summer the SPHL, a brand-new minor league, was seeking to found teams and came to an arrangement with the Von Braun Center about a new franchise in Huntsville. When the Huntsville Havoc began in 2004, their appearance brought an end to the Channel Cats' stay and caused the old franchise to cease operations. While the Havoc had an inauspicious start, the team did eventually capture the interest of the fan base and trended upwards in their attendance figures over their first 15 seasons. Three league championships in that time helped the Havoc consistently draw above the league average and allowed them to survive the rocky period during the pandemic. The success of the Havoc led to the SPHL expanding to Birmingham in 2017 and the resurrection of the 'Bulls' name. The third Birmingham Bulls saw a decent amount of success in their first few seasons, making the league finals twice in six years. Art Clarkson was integral in bringing the team back and was managing partner for the first few years. He stepped down after their first run to the title game and died later in 2019.

== Teams ==
=== Professional ===
==== Active ====
| Team | City | League | Arena | Founded |
|---|---|---|---|---|
| Huntsville Havoc | Huntsville | SPHL | Von Braun Center | 2004 |
| Birmingham Bulls (fourth) | Birmingham | SPHL | Pelham Civic Center | 2017 |

* relocated

==== Inactive ====
| Team | City | League | Years active | Fate |
|---|---|---|---|---|
| Birmingham Bulls | Birmingham | WHA; CHL | 1976–1979; 1979–1981 | Defunct |
| Birmingham South Stars | Birmingham | CPHL | 1982–1983 | Defunct |
| Birmingham Bulls (second) | Birmingham | ACHL | 1983–1984 | Defunct |
| Birmingham Bulls (third) | Birmingham | ECHL | 1992–2001 | Adirondack Thunder |
| Huntsville Blast | Huntsville | ECHL | 1993–1994 | Utah Grizzlies |
| Mobile Mysticks | Mobile | ECHL | 1995–2002 | Atlanta Gladiators |
| Huntsville Channel Cats | Huntsville | SHL; CHL; SEHL | 1995–1996; 1996–2001; 2003–2004 | Defunct |
| Alabama Slammers | Pelham | WHA2 | 2003–2004 | Defunct |

== Club ==
| Team | University | Colors |
|---|---|---|
| Alabama Crimson Tide | University of Alabama | Crimson |
| UAH Chargers | University of Alabama in Huntsville | Blue |
| UAB Blazers | University of Alabama at Birmingham | Green |
| Auburn Tigers | Auburn University | Orange |

=== Inactive ===
| Team | City | Gender | Division | League | Years active |
|---|---|---|---|---|---|
| Alabama–Huntsville Chargers | Huntsville | Men's | NCAA Division I | WCHA | 1985–2001 |

=== Timeline ===
Active Active (out of state)

== Players ==
location of cities

With low statewide engagement (just over 2,000 players were registered as members of USA Hockey in 2023), Alabama has been able to produce just a few notable players. Unsurprisingly, the only two native Alabamians to reach the NHL both hail from Huntsville.

=== Notable players by city ===
==== Huntsville ====
- Nic Dowd
- Jared Ross

† relocated from elsewhere.
