= Ice hockey in Massachusetts =

- Flag of Massachusetts
- Country: United States
- Governing body: USA Hockey
- National teams: Men's national team Women's national team
- First played: 1896

Club competitions
- List: NHL / PWHL (major professional) AHL / ECHL (minor professional) NCAA (collegiate) NAHL / NA3HL / USPHL / USHS (junior)

Massachusetts has been central to US ice hockey since the introduction of the sport in the late-19th century. No state in the union has more professional, collegiate or junior teams than the Bay State chiefly due to the consistent and long-standing support of the local fan bases.

== History ==
=== Foundation ===
Even with cold winters similar to those experienced north of the border, ice hockey did catch on in Massachusetts until the later half of the 1890s. However, this does not mean that winter sports were not pursued by residents. Students at Harvard, for example, were playing a game called "ice polo" around the same time. That game was similar in many respects but used a ball rather than a puck and had a different number of players per side as well as different equipment. It was in fact partly due to the efforts of one Harvard undergraduate that ice hockey was brought to Massachusetts.

Robert Wrenn, a future US Open champion, attended a Tennis tournament in Niagara Falls in the fall of 1892. The junior, as well as Brown freshman Malcolm Greene Chace, were engaged by some of their Canadian counterparts and eventually came to discuss the various winter sports they played. Some of the attendees were members of the Victoria Hockey Club and invited the two Americans to attend one of their matches in Montreal. Wrenn and Chace were both immediately taken with the game and attempted to convince their fellow students to begin playing. Unfortunately, neither found much success at their respective schools. By the time Wrenn graduated in 1893, the school was still playing ice polo and there was no indication that the game of hockey was anywhere to be seen in Boston or Massachusetts.

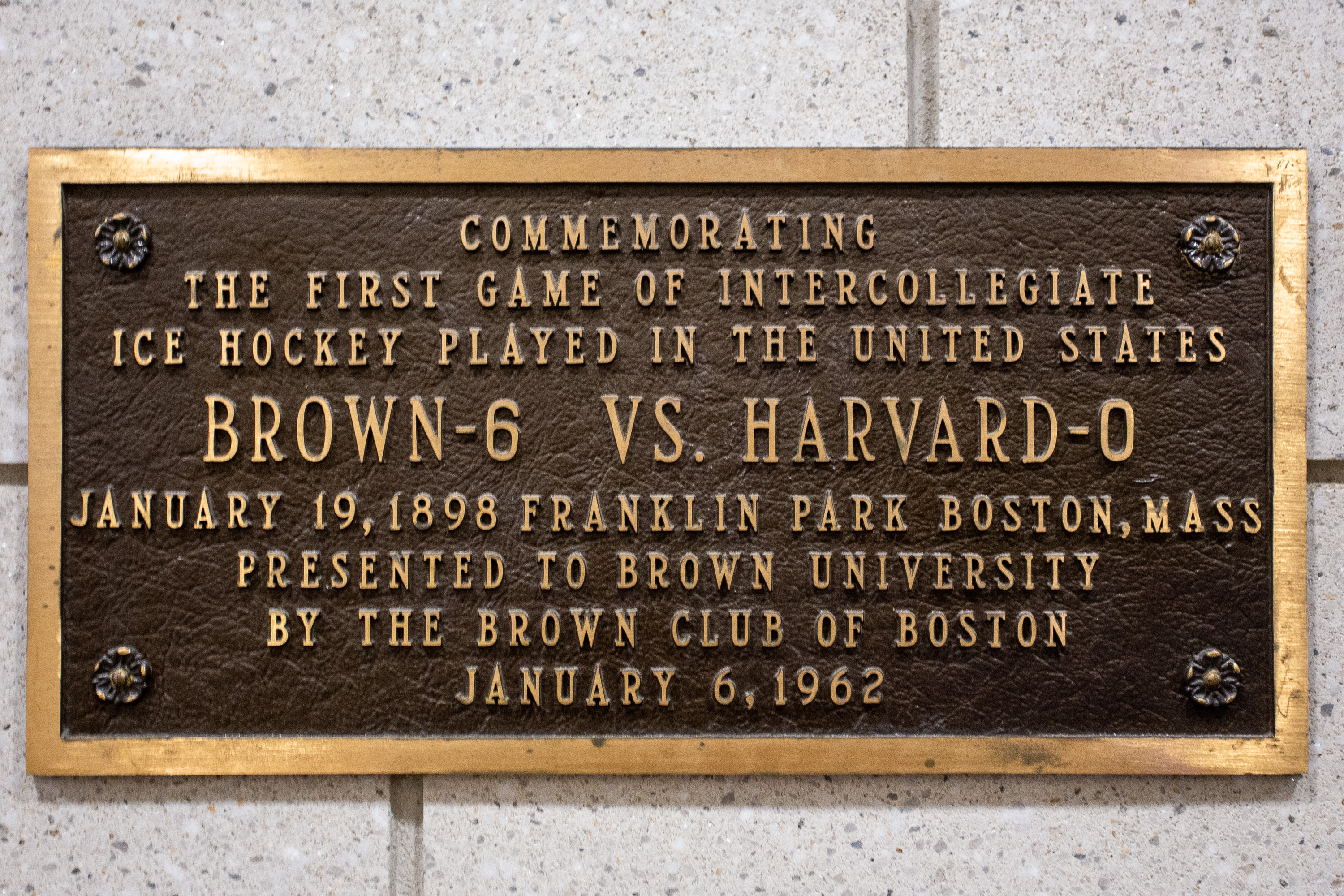
A plaque in Meehan Auditorium commemorates the first game

Though his efforts looked to have been in vain at the time, a fellow Harvard student was convinced to give the game a chance. T. Henry Clarkson, a member of the school's ice polo team, was invited to join Chace on an interscholastic barnstorming team during the winter of 1894–95. The team proved to be a resounding success in raising the profile of the game in the United States. Clarkson returned to his alma mater and tried to advocate for the game, however, he was met by the same resistance. Due in part to the total lack of indoor facilities, the ice surfaces were still being monopolized by ice polo matches and hockey was unable to gain a foothold in the region.

Despite Clarkson's failure to start the school's hockey team, one of his teammates on the polo squad, Frederick Goodridge, did eventually succeed. After fellow Ivy League schools Columbia, Penn and Yale had all founded their own ice hockey teams, Harvard finally agreed to give the game a try. The first match for the Crimson occurred on January 19, 1898, at Franklin Park in Boston. Though this was not the first ice hockey game held in Massachusetts, it was the match that helped change the course of winter sports in the region.

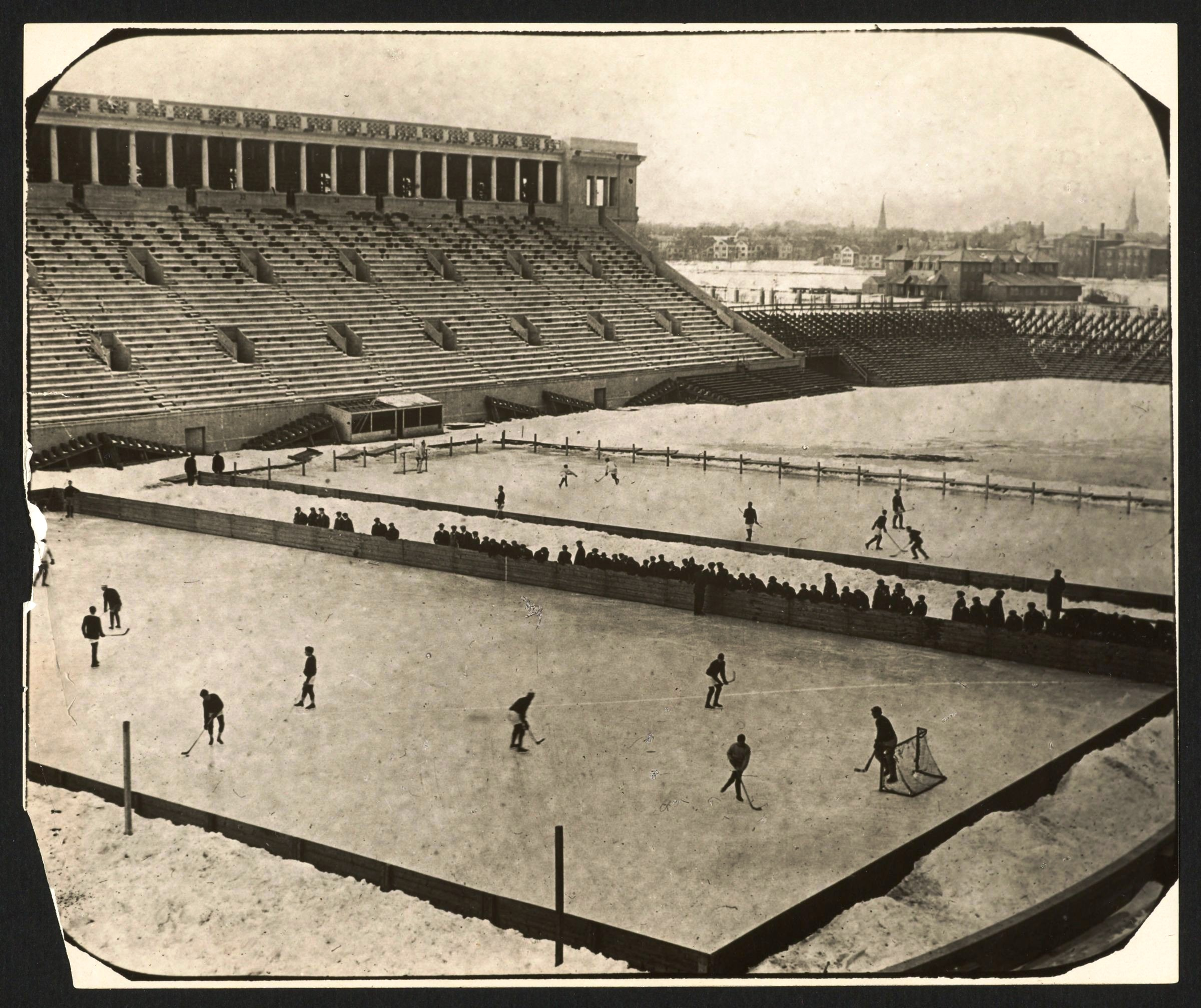
The two ice hockey rinks at Harvard Stadium

The popularity of hockey turned ice polo into an afterthought and that sport was largely abandoned by the dawn of the 20th century. Harvard began playing the game regularly and were soon joined by MIT and a host of local amateur clubs. Ice times were hard to come by in the early years as there were no permanent indoor rinks, but local teams were able to get by during most winters. Natural surfaces proved to be inherently unreliable, not only due to the effects of sun and weather, but also because rivers, lakes and ponds would not always freeze completely. Once again, Harvard was the engine of change; in 1905 the school began building a seasonal rink on top of its football field. Several other colleges in the region followed suit, including Amherst, UMass and Williams. It was also at this time that local secondary schools began to pick up the game as well, including some of the more prestigious prep schools such as Phillips Academy and Noble and Greenough School. Using football fields was only a solution available for schools and colleges. Other teams had to find different solutions but help was on the way.

In 1910, the Boston Arena was built, bringing an artificial ice rink to the state for the first time. The venue immediately became the home of the Boston Hockey Club, the top amateur team in the region, and would serve as the main facility for just about every team based in and around Boston for the next several years. At one time, the rink was used by the BHC, Boston Athletic Association, Harvard, MIT, Boston College, Boston University, Northeastern, Tufts and just about every high school in the Boston metro area.

=== Professional hockey ===
While ice hockey was flourishing in Massachusetts in the first quarter of the century, few if any of the players were professionals. That changed in 1924 when Charles Adams purchased the rights to start an NHL franchise and founded the Boston Bruins. The Bruins began, as many Boston teams before them, playing out of the Boston Arena, however, it soon became apparent that the 6,000-seat venue was nowhere near big enough to suit the fan base. Within a few years the Boston Garden was built and the Bruins didn't need to do too much convincing to bring in more than 13,000 fans per game. The first season in their new home also saw the Bruins win the Stanley Cup for the first time, doing so with former Harvard luminary George Owen.

Hockey's popularity continued to spread outwards from Boston. The Springfield Indians began in 1926, however, the first franchise got into financial trouble due to the Great Depression and folded midway through the 1932–33 season. Around three years later, a second team relocated to Springfield and assumed the mantle of the Indians. This team spent much of the next 60 years playing in western Massachusetts, serving as a stabilizing force for the American Hockey league.

Professional teams continued to appear over the years around the state. Fitchburg, Lowell, North Adams, Worcester and other cities around the state were home to professional teams at one time or another. Although many locales did not support pro hockey for very long, several towns have long supported minor league teams.

=== Players ===
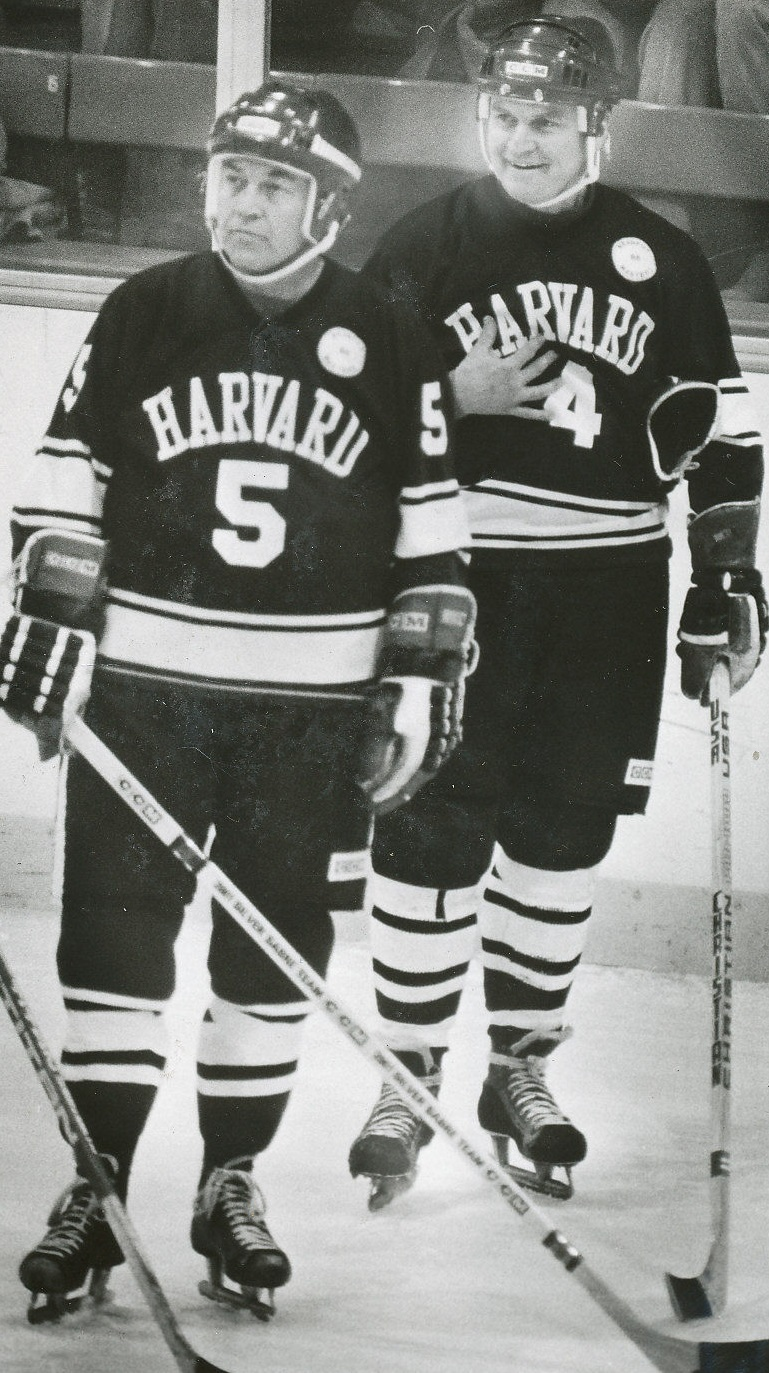
Bill (left) and Bob Cleary (right)

The early adoption of high school and collegiate hockey helped lay the framework for the sport to become part of the culture in Massachusetts. However, even with many natives playing hockey from an early age, there were few professional opportunities for many years. for most of its first 50 years, the NHL found the vast majority of its players from Canada. This policy was particularly conspicuous after World War II where for several years there was no Americans playing at the top level. There was no single reason for this, however, certain occurrences can be listed as contributing factors. The foundation of the national segregation goes back to the games very creation.

Canada had not only invested ice hockey but also spread its appeal across the country very quickly. It took the United States some years to even begin playing the game, let along begin to see it become popular. On top of that, most of the US did not have sufficiently cold winters to allow natural surfaces to serve as ad hoc rinks and thus the game was limited to the northern most parts of the country or those areas who could afford to build the first artificial rinks. This left the US lagging far behind not only in experience buy training as well. In the early part of the 20th century, these results were born out often when American and Canadian colleges clashed, with the most common result being wins by the Canadian side. On top of that, most executives for professional teams were also Canadians and a natural bias towards players from their country cannot be discounted. With the general consensus of Canadians being better on the ice than Americans, few US-born players were given the opportunity to prove that sentiment wrong.

Despite the deficit on the American side, many eastern colleges stubbornly refused to change their recruiting practices after the war. John Kelley, the head coach at Boston College, believed that recruiting Canadians would hamper the development of Americans players. As most of the colleges sporting ice hockey programs were located in New England, this meant that many players from Massachusetts had opportunities to continue their playing careers after high school. In the 1950s, many of these players would end up winning Olympic medals as members of the Team USA including Len Ceglarski, Bill Cleary, and Jack Mulhern. The performance of the players on an international stage helped to provide some of them with opportunities, but it wasn't until 1967 that there was a viable path into the professional ranks.

In 1966, there were just six NHL teams and an equivalent number of minor clubs in the AHL, IHL and CHL. 1967 saw the NHL double its size overnight and, by the time the WHA appeared in 1972, there were thirty major professional teams in North America. The minors too expanded with many new teams and leagues being formed throughout the 1970s. The result of this was a huge influx of players into the professional ranks, many of whom would never have gotten opportunities previously. Massachusetts, with its ready-made pool of talent, was one of the main beneficiaries and saw players like Bobby Sheehan and Larry Pleau not only get the chance to compete against the best prospects in the world in the CHL, but use that as a platform to launch NHL careers.

Even with increased opportunities, it still took some time for the old biases to fade. Even though the high school system in Massachusetts had produced several quality NHL players, it wasn't until 1981 that one was selected in the first round. Bobby Carpenter went 3rd overall to the Washington Capitals and was an instant success, scoring 30 goals as a teenager. He was followed shortly thereafter by Tom Barrasso who also made the jump directly from high school hockey to the NHL, but most Massachusetts prospects would spend at least some time in either the collegiate or minor leagues before reaching the bigs.

=== Culture ===
Hockey's deep roots in Massachusetts were established not only by the numerous teams and players but also by the significance of the games. The Beanpot, held each year since 1952, is the premier in-season tournament for college hockey and routinely provides a spectacle for Boston in early February. The Boston Bruins reached the Stanley Cup Final nine times in their first 35 years, winning the championship three times during that period. However, no moment in the history of ice hockey, if not all of Massachusetts sports, is as iconic as Bobby Orr sailing through the air as he scores the overtime winner to capture the Cup in 1970.
