= Ice hockey in Tennessee =

- Flag of Tennessee
- Country: United States
- Governing body: USA Hockey
- National teams: Men's national team Women's national team
- First played: 1961

Club competitions
- List: NHL (major professional) SPHL (minor professional)

Tennessee has seen slow but steady growth with ice hockey since the late 1990s. Since the arrival of the Nashville Predators, the sport has grown in the Volunteer State far faster than most other southern states.

== History ==
Beginning in the mid 60s, Tennessee was the target for expansion with minor professional ice hockey teams. The three largest cities in the state, Knoxville, Memphis and Nashville all received teams during this time. There was some mild success on the ice but none of the teams were able to capture the public interest and all were gone within a decade. Other than an abortive attempt in the early 1980s, the state remained without an established team for over 15 years.

A second concerted effort brought the sport back to the Volunteer State in the form of the Knoxville Cherokees. The team had four winning seasons in nine years and never made it past the first round of the playoffs, however, the Cherokees were still able to bring in crowds of increasing size. By 1997 the average attendance had risen from about 2,100 per game to nearly 3,500 and was continuing to trend upwards. Though the team moved to Florida in 1997, their box office success helped to bring two other teams to the state. The Memphis RiverKings arrived with great fanfare in 1992, drawing crowds of more than 5,000 for their first two years. Afterwards, the attendance figures steadily declined over time but remained strong enough for the team to stick around for 15 years. In that time, Memphis was a pair of league championships before moving just across the border to Southaven, Mississippi.

In 1989, the Nashville Knights had a strong start just like the RiverKings, however, their attendance declined at a much quicker rate. The team survived for seven seasons before relocating to Florida. Not willing to give up on the market, a CHL team began in 1996. The Nashville Ice Flyers / Nighthawks saw modest attendance figures for their two years of existence but the team was playing on borrowed time as plans to begin the Nashville Predators had kicked off in early 1997.

Upon their arrival, the Predators were one of several new teams in the south, along with the Carolina Hurricanes, Florida Panthers, Dallas Stars and Tampa Bay Lightning. However, the team was unable to form any rivalry with their southern counterparts as the team was placed in a division with Chicago, Detroit and St. Louis. The team also failed to make the postseason for the first five years and, while that wasn't entirely unexpected, it did nothing to help the growth of the sport in the region. Nashville made its first postseason appearance in 2004 but then saw any gains they had made be washed away by the NHL lockout. Nashville began to see much greater success after 2005 and finished with a winning record for seven consecutive seasons. After the arrival of P. K. Subban in 2016, Nashville made its first trip to the Stanley Cup Finals and followed that up by winning the Presidents' Trophy the next season. Aside from his prowess on the ice, Subban was also important for be the first black leader for the franchise and sell itself to the sizable minority community in the state.

Throughout its history, Tennessee had never been home to a single college ice hockey program but that changed in 2023. Tennessee State announced that it was starting a club ice hockey team in 2024 and would hope to promote it to varsity status in the near future. While those plans in an of themselves weren't unique, Tennessee State is a HBCU and would be the first of its kind in the nation to ice a team. Additionally, Tennessee State would be just the second college in the south to support a varsity program if their plans come to fruition, with the only other previous team being Alabama–Huntsville.

== Teams ==
=== Professional ===
==== Active ====
Team	City	League	Arena	Founded
Nashville Predators	Nashville	NHL	Bridgestone Arena	1998
Knoxville Ice Bears	Knoxville	SPHL	Knoxville Civic Coliseum	2002

==== Inactive ====
Team	City	League	Years active	Fate
Knoxville Knights	Knoxville	EHL	1961–1968	Defunct
Nashville Dixie Flyers	Nashville	EHL	1962–1971	Defunct
Memphis Wings	Memphis	CPHL	1964–1967 ^{†}	Fort Worth Wings
Memphis South Stars	Memphis	CPHL	1967–1969	Iowa Stars
Nashville South Stars	Nashville	CHL; ACHL	1981–1982; 1982–1983	Virginia Lancers
Knoxville Cherokees	Knoxville	ECHL	1988–1997	Pee Dee Pride
Nashville Knights	Nashville	ECHL	1989–1996	Pensacola Ice Pilots
Memphis RiverKings	Memphis	CHL	1992–2007	Mississippi RiverKings
Nashville Ice Flyers / Nighthawks	Nashville	CHL	1996–1998	Defunct
Knoxville Speed	Knoxville	UHL	1999–2002 ^{†}	Defunct

=== Junior ===
==== Inactive ====
Team	City	League	Years active	Fate
Nashville Junior Predators	Nashville	NA3HL	2014–2018	Defunct

† Relocated from elsewhere.

=== Timeline ===
Active Active (out of state)

== Players ==
location of cities

Due in no small part to the dearth of junior hockey in the state, Tennessee has produced very few home grown players. However, the state has seen an increase in the number of players with Tennessee falling in the middle third in the nation with just under 5,000 residents registered with USA Hockey in 2022. By percentage, that accounts for approximately 0.07% of the population, or about 1 in every 1,400 people.

=== Notable players by city ===
==== Memphis ====
- Jon Awe

==== Brentwood ====
- Blake Geoffrion ^{†}

† relocated from elsewhere.
