= Ice hockey in Vermont =

- Flag of Vermont
- Country: United States
- Governing body: USA Hockey
- National teams: Men's national team Women's national team
- First played: 1909

Club competitions
- List: NCAA (collegiate) EHL (junior)

Vermont has a long history with ice hockey in the United States. Despite the state's sparse population, its location in New England placed Vermont in the middle of ice hockey circles, particularly at the college level.

== History ==
The close proximity to Canada afforded Vermont with a very close view of ice hockey as far back as the 19th century. Several local clubs were arranged but nothing formal occurred until 1909. One of those amateur teams was put together by a group of students at Norwich University. After garnering some interest from the student body, the school gave its blessing to the program and the first sanctioned team in Vermont hit the ice the following year. Unfortunately, a lack of facilities left the Cadets scrambling to find available ice and eventually forced the program to be suspended in 1913. After World War I, ice hockey returned to the state when Middlebury began its men's program. They were joined that season by Saint Michael's which, aside from cutting down on travel costs, provided each with a local rival. With an increasing number of rinks in the state, Norwich was able to secure a home venue and return in 1925. That same year, the state's flagship university, Vermont also hit the ice, giving the state a solid foundation with the sport. However, after the Great Depression the cost of business became too much. During the 1930s, Norwich, Vermont and Saint Michael's were each forced to suspend operations. Only Middlebury was able to carry on through the difficulties.

Eventually the financial situation improved and Norwich returned to the ice by the end of the 30s. Just as the others were considering revivals of their own, World War II broke out and all programs were mothballed in the early 40s. Once the war had ended, Middlebury and Norwich restarted in short order with Saint Michael's making an abortive attempt in the 50s. The Catamounts, however, did not get back onto the ice until the 1960s. Despite the long wait, the team was very successful in its return, winning three league championships over a 5-year span. Vermont promoted its program to the top division in 1974 and has remained there ever since, albeit with less success. In the meantime, Middlebury flited with a championship in the late 1970s, however, because the school was a member of NESCAC, they were forbidden from playing in national tournaments. Despite that barrier, ice hockey in Vermont was flourishing in the late 70s and eventually the Green Mountain state became a foursome once more when Saint Michael's was able to bring its team back in 1982.

In the mid-90s, the NESCAC changed its rules and finally allowed its member school to participate in national tournaments. Within a year, Middlebury won its first championship and proceeded to win the next four as well. The Panthers became the first team in college hockey history to win five consecutive championships. Spurred on by their long-time rival, Norwich was able to win its first championship in 2000, ending Middlebury's run. In the first decade of the 21st century, five additional Division III national titles were won by Middlebury and Norwich, making the state the center of D-III ice hockey.

The success of the men's programs led to increased interest from other quarters. Middlebury was the first Division II or III college to found a women's team, playing its inaugural season in 1981. The other Vermont schools were slower on the uptake but by 2006 each of them was sporting a women's program as well. With so much college hockey going on in the state, eventually the sport spilled over into different branches. Vermont high schools had long sported varsity programs but the state did not receive its first formal junior team until 2000. The Green Mountain Glades were members of the Eastern Junior Hockey League, a Tier III league, and survived for over a decade before relocating to Maine. Two years after their departure, a second low-level junior team arrived. The Vermont Lumberjacks continued to call the state home, as of 2023, and have been relatively successful on the ice.

In terms of professional hockey, Vermont has seen very little interest. With the state's most populous city being Burlington at just north of 44,000 residents (ranked 870th in the nation in 2020), Vermont just doesn't have enough people to support a pro team. To date, only one attempt was made and it proved to be rather disastrous; the Vermont Wild played during the fall of 2011. At the start the team performed about as well as could be expected for an expansion team but their attendance figures were woeful. Playing out of the 1,000-seat Green Mountain Arena, the Wild only could get about 1/4 of the venue filled. The showing was so dismal that the team only played 10 of their scheduled 53 games before folding.

== Teams ==
=== Professional ===
==== Inactive ====
Team	City	League	Years active	Fate
Vermont Wild	Morrisville	FHL	2011	Defunct

=== Collegiate ===
==== Active ====
Team	City	Gender	Division	League	Arena	Founded
Norwich Cadets	Northfield	Men's	NCAA Division III	NEHC	Kreitzberg Arena	1909
Norwich Cadets	Northfield	Women's	NCAA Division III	NEHC	Kreitzberg Arena	2006
Middlebury Panthers	Middlebury	Men's	NCAA Division III	NESCAC	Kenyon Arena	1922
Middlebury Panthers	Middlebury	Women's	NCAA Division III	NESCAC	Kenyon Arena	1981
Saint Michael's Purple Knights	Colchester	Men's	NCAA Division II	NE10	C. Douglas Cairns Arena	1922
Saint Michael's Purple Knights	Colchester	Women's	NCAA Division I	NEWHA	C. Douglas Cairns Arena	2000
Vermont Catamounts	Burlington	Men's	NCAA Division I	Hockey East	Gutterson Fieldhouse	1925
Vermont Catamounts	Burlington	Women's	NCAA Division I	Hockey East	Gutterson Fieldhouse	1998

=== Junior ===
==== Active ====
Team	City	League	Arena	Founded
Vermont Lumberjacks	Burlington	EHL	Leddy Arena	2014

==== Inactive ====
Team	City	League	Years active	Fate
Green Mountain Glades	Williston	EJHL	2000–2012	Defunct

=== Timeline ===
Active Active (out of state)

== Players ==
=== Notable players by city ===
location of cities

Vermont has a very high level of engagement with ice hockey. In 2022, 0.663% of the population was registered with USA Hockey, or about 1 in every 150 people. That was good enough for 4th in the nation, ahead of traditional hotbeds like Massachusetts and Michigan. With the state's low overall population that only translates to approximately 4,000 people, however, that hasn't stopped several Vermont natives from making a name in the sport.

- Charles Adams was a grocery store magnate and avid fan. He founded the Boston Bruins, the first NHL team in the US.
- John LeClair was the first person from Vermont to both win a Stanley Cup and a medal at the Winter Olympics.
- Amanda Pelkey was a 4-year player at Vermont and went on to win a gold medal at the 2018 Winter Olympics.
- Gary Wright played collegiately at Vermont and coached ice hockey for over 40 years.

==== Barre ====
- Maggie LaGue

==== Burlington ====
- Gary Wright

==== Montpelier ====
- Amanda Pelkey

==== Newport ====
- Graham Mink

==== Norwich ====
- Steve Shirreffs ^{†}

==== Shelburne ====
- Peter Lenes

==== St. Albans ====
- John LeClair

==== Stowe ====
- Brady Leisenring

† relocated from elsewhere.
