= Ice hockey in New Mexico =

- Flag of New Mexico
- Country: United States
- Governing body: USA Hockey
- National teams: Men's national team Women's national team
- First played: 1973

Club competitions
- List: NAHL, NA3HL (junior)

New Mexico has had very little impact on ice hockey in the United States. Only a few attempts have been made to increase the visibility of the sport in the Land of Enchantment and most have failed.

== History ==
As one of the most southern and most sparsely populated states (New Mexico didn't have 1 million residents until the 1960s.) New Mexico was largely ignored in ice hockey circles for 60 years after achieving statehood. It wasn't until the mid-70s that the Central Hockey League took a chance and placed a team in the state. The Albuquerque Six-Guns debuted in 1973 at the Tingley Coliseum with the plan of having them serve as a farm team for the Kansas City Scouts. However, because the Scouts would not begin play until the following year, the team was forced to build its roster from scratch. Unsurprisingly, the Six-Guns were the worst team in the CHL that year, winning just 16 of their 72 games. The lack of success didn't help the team earn many fans, and the club folded after that year.

A second attempt at expanding ice hockey in the state wasn't made for 20 years. The vacuum ended in the mid-90s when the New Mexico Scorpions were founding members of the Western Professional Hockey League. The team started well, winning the regular season championship in its first season. This fast start helped endear the team to the local fan base, and the Scorpions were able to draw an average of at least 4,000 fans for their first five seasons. While the WPHL collapsed in 2001, the Scorpions were absorbed into the Central Hockey League and continued to enjoy broad support, seeing their annual attendance numbers trend upwards. Unfortunately, it wasn't enough for ownership and the team folded after the 2005 season. Hoping to save the franchise, former NHLers Dave Ellett and Brian Savage bought the team name and brought hockey back to the state with the inaugural game at the Santa Ana Star Center in 2006. However, the year away and a move to outside of Albuquerque proper proved disastrous for the club. The team drew about 3,200 fans per night upon its return, and saw those numbers sink lower in each of the next two seasons. In 2009, the team folded due to a myriad of problems, not least of which being a lack of interest by the locals.

Junior hockey was brought to New Mexico in 1996 as well with the debut of the New Mexico Ice Breakers. The team had a mildly successful run for 5 years in the Western States Hockey League but ceased operations in 2001. Immediately following the dissolution of the Scorpions, junior hockey returned following the relocation of a team from Texas. The New Mexico Renegades were also members of the WSHL but hurt their chances at establishing themselves by being one of the worst teams in the league. The Renegades finished at or near the bottom of their division for each of their five years in Rio Rancho. The team never produced a winning record and on three occasions couldn't even get to 10 wins on the year. During their existence, the Renegades had to compete for fans as a second junior team, the New Mexico Mustangs arrived in 2010. The Mustangs were only slightly more successful on the ice but even worse off financially. After just 2 seasons, the club suspended operations and was later sold to a group that moved the franchise to Minnesota.

Following the end of the Renegades, the state was left without a team until 2019 when the New Mexico Ice Wolves were founded. The team could hardly have picked a worse time to start as the COVID-19 pandemic cut their inaugural season short and then play all of their home game in Texas the following year due to health restrictions. However, the team was able to survive the inauspicious start and reached the league semifinals in their third season. With the franchise finally able to keep itself afloat, it expanded in 2022 by adding a sister team of the same name in the NA3HL.

== Teams ==
=== Professional ===
==== Inactive ====
Team	City	League	Years active	Fate
Albuquerque Six-Guns	Albuquerque	CHL	1973–1974	Defunct
Albuquerque Chaparrals	Albuquerque	SWHL	1975–1977	Defunct
New Mexico Scorpions	Albuquerque	WPHL; CHL	1996–2001; 2001–2005	Defunct
New Mexico Scorpions (second)	Rio Rancho	CHL	2006–2009	Defunct

=== Junior ===
==== Active ====
Team	City	League	Arena	Founded
New Mexico Ice Wolves	Albuquerque	NAHL	Outpost Ice Arenas	2019
New Mexico Ice Wolves (second)	Albuquerque	NA3HL	Outpost Ice Arenas	2022 ^{†}

==== Inactive ====
Team	City	League	Years active	Fate
New Mexico Ice Breakers	Albuquerque	WSHL	1996–2001	Defunct
New Mexico Renegades	Rio Rancho	WSHL	2009–2014	Defunct
New Mexico Mustangs	Rio Rancho	NAHL	2010–2012	Defunct

† relocated from elsewhere.

=== Timeline ===
Active Active (out of state)

== Players ==
location of cities

Due to the paucity of ice hockey rinks for much of its history, New Mexico has produced very few players who have achieved any notability in ice hockey.

- Travis Dodson is a Paralympian who won gold medals at the 2018 and 2022 Winter Paralympics.

=== Notable players by city ===
==== Silver City ====
- Travis Dodson

==== Raised out of state ====
- Christophe Brown
