= Ice hockey in Louisiana =

- Flag of Louisiana
- Country: United States
- Governing body: USA Hockey
- National teams: Men's national team Women's national team
- First played: 1995

Club competitions
- List: FPHL (minor professional) NAHL (junior)

Louisiana has seen many failed attempts to expand ice hockey within its borders. While many teams have met unfortunate ends, a concerted effort has allowed a few teams to establish themselves in the state.

== History ==
Louisiana was effectively an afterthought for the ice hockey community until the 1990s. When the sport began expanding south at the end of the 20th century, the Bayou State was one of the main targets for minor professional leagues. The Louisiana IceGators were the first team to call the state home. When they debuted in 1995, the IceGators were very successful in the ticket booth; after drawing more than 9,000 fans on average for their inaugural season, the team saw crowds of over 11,000 for years two and three. The immediate success induced the ECHL to relocate a dormant franchise to Baton Rouge in 1996 and then place a third team in the state in 1997. With the Baton Rouge Kingfish and New Orleans Brass both in action, the year-old WPHL decided to get into the action and expanded eastwards with the Bossier-Shreveport Mudbugs, Monroe Moccasins and Lake Charles Ice Pirates beginning play in 1997 and the Alexandria Warthogs following a year afterwards. A state that had virtually no history with ice hockey suddenly found itself with seven different minor league teams but the shine had already worn off.

The initial success of IceGators soon fell away and the attendance figures for the club dropped precipitously after 1999. While those figures didn't adversely affect the team well into the 21st century, the other clubs had not started out in such a charmed position. The Kingfish, who were mired in mediocrity for the stay in Louisiana, began with crowds numbering 6,000 but saw that number diminish every year. The Brass, on the other hand, posted winning records every year and their march to the quarterfinals in year two allowed the team to move into the much larger New Orleans Arena. Their attendance figures swelled but soon relaxed to less than 5,000. While that number was still enough to keep the team afloat, the team was offered a poison pill when the New Orleans Hornets arrived in 2002. The NBA franchise got the state (the owners of the Arena at the time) to force the Brass to cover the cost of converting the building from basketball to hockey and back as a condition of remaining at the venue. Though the team was solvent, they would not have been able to afford the additional expense and were forced to search elsewhere for a home. To make matters worse, the Municipal Auditorium, the original home of the team, had just finished a renovation that had included the removal of the icemaking equipment. With no viable buildings available the team folded and the rest of the ECHL teams fell like dominoes.

In the meantime, the WPHL had fared even worse. While the Mudbugs were one of the leagues best teams, winning three consecutive championships and commanding more than 4,000 in attendance in each of their first four seasons, the Warthogs were only able to stick around for two years while the Ice Pirates and Moccasins each saw dwindling ticket sales and folded in 2001. That season saw the collapse of the entire league and while that could have meant the dissolution of the Mudbugs as well, the team was able to stay alive when the WPHL merged with the CHL. The team not only survived but flourished in their new league, routinely winning their division while making several deep playoff runs. In the mid-2000s, the Mudbugs were seeing over 5,000 fans per game but their finances took a hit during the Great Recession. After 2008, the team saw its crowd diminish to less than 3,500 and, despite winning the league championship in 2011, the team could no longer afford to operate.

In 2005, junior hockey arrived in the state in the form of the Cajun Catahoulas. The team was never successful, winning just 19 games in three years before relocating. After the recession, the SPHL sought to bring the IceGators back in 2009. Despite using the same venue as the previous incarnation, the Cajundome, the team could barely draw more than 2,000 fans per game, well below the league average. Even success on the ice was unable to bring more people into the building and the IceGators got what they hoped was good news when the Cajundome closed for renovations in 2016. The team suspended operations for the season with intent of returning once the venue reopened, however, in the interim the team shut down its business department and website. In 2018 the franchise was sold and moved to the Quad Cities.

After the departure of the second IceGators, another revival occurred in the state when the Shreveport Mudbugs returned. While the new team played junior hockey and had no formal connection to the prior club, they used the same venue, colors and logo while also bringing back former Mudbug Kārlis Zirnis as the team first head coach. The team was an instant hit, just like their namesake, and they won the league championship in their second season. A second title followed after the COVID-19 pandemic and helped establish the team as a fixture. Baton Rouge was the next city to see a return of ice hockey when the Baton Rouge Zydeco were founded in 2023.

== Teams ==
=== Professional ===
==== Active ====
Team	City	League	Arena	Founded
Baton Rouge Kingfish	Baton Rouge	FPHL	Raising Cane's River Center Arena	2026
Monroe Moccasins	Monroe	FPHL	Monroe Civic Center	2024

==== Inactive ====
Team	City	League	Years active	Fate
Louisiana IceGators	Lafayette	ECHL	1995–2005	Defunct
Baton Rouge Kingfish	Baton Rouge	ECHL	1996–2003	Defunct
New Orleans Brass	New Orleans	ECHL	1997–2002	Defunct
Bossier-Shreveport Mudbugs	Bossier City	WPHL; CHL	1997–2001; 2001–2011	Defunct
Lake Charles Ice Pirates	Lake Charles	WPHL	1997–2001	Defunct
Monroe Moccasins	Monroe	WPHL	1997–2001	Defunct
Alexandria Warthogs	Alexandria	WPHL	1998–2000	Defunct
Louisiana IceGators (second)	Lafayette	SPHL	2009–2016	Quad City Storm
Baton Rouge Zydeco	Baton Rouge	FPHL	2023-2026	Defunct

=== Junior ===
==== Active ====
Team	City	League	Arena	Founded
Shreveport Mudbugs	Shreveport	NAHL	Hirsch Memorial Coliseum	2016

==== Inactive ====
Team	City	League	Years active	Fate
Cajun Catahoulas	Carencro	WSHL	2005–2008	Defunct

* Relocated from elsewhere

=== Timeline ===
Active Active (out of state) --->

== Players ==
In spite of the myriad professional team that have called the state home, Louisiana residents have a very low level of engagement. Less than 300 people were registered with USA Hockey in 2022 placing the state 50th in the nation in terms of both total and population percentage.
