= Ice hockey in South Carolina =

- Flag of South Carolina
- Country: United States
- Governing body: USA Hockey
- National teams: Men's national team Women's national team
- First played: 1993

Club competitions
- List: ECHL (minor professional)

South Carolina has a passing relationship with ice hockey. With professional hockey not being introduced until 1993 and very little junior system framework to speak of, South Carolina is an example of the overall dearth of ice hockey in the Deep South.

== History ==
Due to South Carolina location in the American Sun Belt as well as its low overall population and the lack of any major media market (Charleston is the largest city with approximately 150,000 people in 2022), South Carolina was largely ignored by the ice hockey community for decades. The state's first professional team arrived in 1993 when the South Carolina Stingrays franchise was founded in North Charleston. The team was an instant success with the fans, drawing more than 9,000 fans on average for its inaugural season. While the team did not sustain those numbers the franchise was given the opportunity to jump from the ECHL (AA hockey) to the AHL (AAA hockey) in 1995. Management eventually declined the offer, believing it better to keep its operating costs and ticket prices low so that their fan base could still attend games.

In the succeeding years, the Stingrays win three Kelly Cups and have been one of the ECHL's most success full teams. As the flagship franchise for the state, the Stingrays have inspired several other attempts at professional hockey in the state but few have succeeded. The Pee Dee Pride (1997), Greenville Grrrowl (1998) and Columbia Inferno (2001) all attempted to expand the reach of ice hockey in the state but none were able to reach their 10-year anniversary. Greenville received its second franchise when the Johnstown Chiefs relocated in 2010 and became the Road Warriors. Though the team underwent a second name change to become the 'Swamp Rabbits', the franchise established itself and signed an affiliation deam with the Los Angeles Kings in 2022.

No college in South Carolina has ever fielded a varsity ice hockey team, nor does the state have any official junior program. Youth ice hockey is conducted at local levels within the bounds of the Southeastern District of USA Hockey.

== Teams ==
=== Professional ===
==== Active ====
Team	City	League	Arena	Founded
South Carolina Stingrays	North Charleston	ECHL	North Charleston Coliseum	1993
Greenville Swamp Rabbits	Greenville	ECHL	Bon Secours Wellness Arena	2010*

* relocated

==== Inactive ====
Team	City	League	Years active	Fate
Pee Dee Pride	Florence	ECHL	1997–2005	Defunct
Greenville Grrrowl	Greenville	ECHL	1998–2006	Defunct
Columbia Inferno	Columbia	ECHL	2001–2008	Defunct

=== Timeline ===
Active Active (out of state)

== Players ==
No ice hockey player raised in South Carolina has yet to distinguish themselves. Only one player born in the state, Ryan Hartman, has achieved a level of notability but he was raised in Illinois. Only 3,008 players were registered with USA Hockey in 2023, accounting for just 0.053% of the state's population. By percentage, South Carolina ranks 42nd in the nation terms of engagement, well in line with many other southern states.
