= Ice hockey in South Dakota =

- Flag of South Dakota
- Country: United States
- Governing body: USA Hockey
- National teams: Men's national team Women's national team
- First played: 1999

Club competitions
- List: ECHL (minor professional) NCAA (collegiate) USHL, NAHL (junior)

South Dakota has a curious history with ice hockey. Despite the state having relatively little history with the sport, South Dakota's proximity to other very engaged states has resulted in a high level of engagement by its residents.

== History ==
For much of its history, South Dakota has had a low population with the entire state having yet to amount to 1 million (approximately 910,000 in 2022). Despite cold winters, which would provide a natural playing surface, ice hockey did not take off in the state for many years.

It wasn't until 1999 that the state received its first franchise when USHL expanded to Sioux Falls. The Sioux Falls Stampede played at the highest level of junior hockey in the US and was routinely stocked with future NHL talent. The team struggled through a few lean years early on but built itself into a force by the mid 00s. Shortly after the Stampede won it first Clark Cup in 2007, the state received its second team when the Rapid City Rush were founded in 2008. The team found success straight away and won the league championship in just its second season. The team was able to quickly establish itself partly by being the only professional game in town and that fact was key in keeping the team alive.

In 2014, the CHL folded, leaving 10 teams scrambling to find a new home. The Rush were one of seven who were accepted into the ECHL for the next season. While their new league made the Rush a more attractive team (now playing AA hockey), the tradeoff was that the team's expenses were also increasing. To help offset those costs, the team was able to sign an affiliate deal and become part of the Phoenix Coyotes system in 2015. The team struggled on the ice afterwards, missing the playoffs for five consecutive seasons, however, that wasn't the worst calamity to befall the Rush. In 2019, the team's business manager was investigate by federal authorities for embezzlement. He later pled guilty to stealing $700,000 between 2010 and 2018 and was ordered to pay $1 million in restitution.

Junior hockey expanded in the state when the Aberdeen Wings were founded in 2010. The team began play as a member of the NAHL, a second-tier junior league. Just like the Stampede, it took a few years for the Wings to build itself into a contender but the team won its first league title in 2019, the same year Sioux Falls earned their third championship.

In 2021 Augustana University announced that, following a successful fundraising campaign spearheaded by T. Denny Sanford, the school would sponsor varsity ice hockey beginning with the 2023–24 season. In order to help the team receive greater exposure, the school signed a deal with Midco, a regional cable broadcaster headquartered in Sioux Falls, to not only become namesake for their new facility (Midco Arena) but to also be the television provider for the team.

== Teams ==
=== Professional ===
==== Active ====
Team	City	League	Arena	Founded
Rapid City Rush	Rapid City	ECHL	The Monument	2008

=== Collegiate ===
==== Active ====
Team	City	Gender	Division	League	Arena	Founded
Augustana Vikings	Sioux Falls	Men's	NCAA Division I	CCHA	Midco Arena	2023

=== Junior ===
==== Active ====
Team	City	League	Arena	Founded
Sioux Falls Stampede	Sioux Falls	USHL	Denny Sanford Premier Center	1999
Aberdeen Wings	Aberdeen	NAHL	Odde Ice Center	2010
Watertown Shamrocks	Watertown	NAHL	Prairie Lakes Ice Arena	2024

=== Timeline ===
Active Active (out of state)

== Players ==
In spite of the state not having an established ice hockey team for decades, South Dakota has a very high level of engagement with the sport. While less 3,000 residents were registered with USA Hockey in 2023, the population percentage of 0.339% placed South Dakota at 13th in the nation, ahead of 'traditional' hockey states like New York and Pennsylvania. While several collegiate players have hailed from South Dakota over the years, no player from South Dakota has yet to achieve a significant level of notoriety.
