= Ice hockey in Idaho =

- Flag of Idaho
- Country: United States
- Governing body: USA Hockey
- National teams: Men's national team Women's national team
- First played: 1997

Club competitions
- List: ECHL (minor professional) USPHL (junior)

Idaho has seen scant interest from ice hockey in the United States. In spite of small investments, the state has seen a decent amount of engagement from residents.

== History ==
Idaho was one of several Rocky Mountain states that was ignored by the ice hockey community at large for many years. It wasn't until the mid-1990s that the gem state received its first professional team. For its third season, the West Coast Hockey League add the Idaho Steelheads as part of its 5-team expansion. The team was middling at best during its first three seasons but that didn't seem to deters fans. The Steelheads averaged just shy of 5,000 per game and they rewarded the patience of the locals when the team reached the league finals in both 2001 and 2002. However, in 2003 the team faced an uncertain future when the WCHL collapsed. Fortunately, the remaining six teams were accepted into the ECHL and the Steelheads promptly won the league championship. After a second title in 2007, the team remained one of the better ECHL clubs but they faced a few problems. Following the Great Recession in 2008, the team saw its attendance figures drop below 4,000 and didn't see any significant recovery for a decade. While the Steelheads managed to survive the downturn, most of their former WCHL compatriots did not. One after another, all of the ECHL's western additions failed, and by 2017 only three ECHL were left in the western half of the United States. Despite losing most of their rivals, Idaho soldiered on and saw its attendance figures swell. Even after the team was forced to cease operations during the COVID-19 pandemic, Idaho brought in move than 5,000 fans per game for the first time in its history in 2022.

Hoping to bank on the success of the pro team, a few attempts were made at placing junior teams in the area. The Idaho Rattlers lasted for parts of three seasons, suspending operations in December 2006. A little over two years later, a more successful attempt was made with the Idaho Jr. Steelheads. The team was an immediate hit, finishing second in their division in their inaugural season before winning 8 consecutive division crowns. In that span the Jr. Steelheads won three overall league titles and five Western States Hockey League Championships. A conflict over their name with the pro Steelheads led the junior club to rebrand as the IceCats in 2017 but the change didn't amount to much. Despite their unqualified success, the team became less of a draw and saw a few as 50 fans per game on some nights. With volunteers and staff feeling the effects as well, the team suspended operations in 2018.

The state was left without a junior team for several years but it finally returned in 2022 with the debut of the Idaho Falls Spud Kings.

== Teams ==
=== Professional ===
==== Active ====
Team	City	League	Arena	Founded
Idaho Steelheads	Boise	ECHL	Idaho Central Arena	1997

=== Junior ===
==== Active ====
Team	City	League	Arena	Founded
Idaho Falls Spud Kings	Idaho Falls	USPHL	Mountain America Center	2022

==== Inactive ====
Team	City	League	Years active	Fate
Idaho Rattlers	Boise	WSHL	2004–2006	Defunct
Idaho Jr. Steelheads	McCall	WSHL	2009–2017	Idaho IceCats
Idaho IceCats	McCall	WSHL	2017–2018	Defunct

=== Timeline ===
Active Active (out of state)

== Players ==
location of cities

Though the sport has only recently seen investment in the sport, Idaho has decent engagement numbers. As of 2022, 0.225% of residents were registered with USA Hockey, putting the state in the middle third of the nation and right between Pennsylvania and Illinois. While the low overall population means that only amounts to 4,600 people, a few native Idahoans have gone on to achieve notability.

=== Notable players by city ===
==== Ketchum ====
- Cody Lampl

==== Raised elsewhere ====
- Guyle Fielder
- Kevin Kantee

† relocated from elsewhere.
