= Ice hockey in Oklahoma =

- Flag of Oklahoma
- Country: United States
- Governing body: USA Hockey
- National teams: Men's national team Women's national team
- First played: 1964

Club competitions
- List: ECHL (minor professional) NAHL (junior)

Oklahoma has a mixed relationship with ice hockey in the United States. Several professional teams have called the Sooner state home with some having extended stays, however, ice hockey has yet to catch on at the grassroots level.

== History ==
An unlikely destination for ice hockey due to both its warm climate and modest population (28th in the nation in 2022), Oklahoma didn't have its first major ice hockey team until 1964. Seeking to increase its footprint in hockey's suddenly expanding sphere of influence, the Toronto Maple Leafs established the Tulsa Oilers as a farm team in the CPHL which had started a year earlier. The following year the Minneapolis Bruins, a subsidiary of the Boston Bruins, relocated to the state and became the Oklahoma City Blazers. In their first year of play the Blazers defeated Tulsa for the league championship and kicked off a rivalry between the two. The championship would remain in Oklahoma for four years, being won by one or the other during that time, but by 1970 the teams began to lose their strength. Once the Bruins withdrew from the Blazers in 1972, the team folded. Oklahoma City went without a pro team for a year before Toronto moved the Oilers to OKC and renamed them as the 'Oklahoma City Blazers'. Immediately following the Oilers departure, a second franchise of the same name was created. Though it began as an independent, it would eventually fall under the oversight of the Atlanta Flames.

The new Tulsa team won the league title in 1976 and managed to establish itself with the community. The same could not be said for the new Blazers. After a good first season, the team declined and by 1976 the Maple Leafs cut the franchise loose as a financial drain. The Colorado Rockies stepped in as sponsors but the Blazers sank to the bottom of the league in 1977 and then folded. A year later the CHL returned to Oklahoma City with the Oklahoma City Stars. The team was run by the Minnesota North Stars for the first three seasons and saw some improvement in that time. After switching to the Calgary Flames in 1981, the team flatlined and finished 29 games under .500. That turned out to be the final year for the Stars, who were never able to establish the same kind of rivalry the Blazers had had with the Oilers. Tulsa, meanwhile soldiered on and traded one parent club for another until 1984 when the CPHL (then called the 'CHL') suspended operations along with all of its league members.

In 1992, the CHL name was revived and both the Tulsa Oilers and Oklahoma City Blazers were resurrected. While neither had any official connection to the earlier iterations other than their names, the two were able to continue the tradition of minor league hockey in Oklahoma. In the new league's first final, the Oilers defeated the Blazers and instantly rekindled the rivalry between the two fan bases. Three years later Oklahoma City won the championship and then added a second in 2001. The Blazers routinely finished ahead of the Oilers in the standings for existence but the team found itself a victim of its own success. When rumors of a potential AHL team in Oklahoma City surfaced in 2009, the Blazers withdrew their lease extension and folded after the season. Just over a year later, the Oklahoma City Barons made their debut but the new team didn't enjoy the same level of interest as the Blazers. Despite producing winning records every year and making two trips to the league semifinals, the Barons continually suffered from poor attendance and by 2015 the team relocated due to financial losses.

In the meantime, the Oilers continued in the CHL until that league folded in 2014. This time, however, Tulsa was able to survive by joining the ECHL. The change to a new league also brought about a chance in the team's fortunes as the Oilers routinely produced winning records in the first decade with the ECHL.

Towards the end of the Barons' tenure in OKC, the city got its first junior team when the Oklahoma City Jr. Blazers began in 2014. The team played in the WSHL for six seasons but saw both the franchise and the league cease operations in 2020 due to the COVID-19 pandemic. In the wake of their disappearance, a different junior team from Wisconsin assumed the mantle of the Jr. Blazers. A year later, they restyled themselves as the Oklahoma City Ice Hawks. Once season later, the NAHL announced that they would be moving into the region in 2022. In order to forestall a fight that they would likely lose, the Ice Hawks moved to New Mexico and OKC got a new junior team in the Oklahoma Warriors.

== Teams ==
=== Professional ===
==== Active ====
Team	City	League	Arena	Founded
Tulsa Oilers (third)	Tulsa	ECHL	BOK Center	1992

==== Inactive ====
Team	City	League	Years active	Fate
Tulsa Oilers	Tulsa	CPHL	1964–1973	Oklahoma City Blazers (second)
Oklahoma City Blazers	Oklahoma City	CPHL	1965–1972	Defunct
Oklahoma City Blazers (second)	Oklahoma City	CPHL	1973–1977	Defunct
Tulsa Oilers (second)	Tulsa	CPHL	1973–1984	Defunct
Oklahoma City Stars	Oklahoma City	CPHL	1978–1982	Defunct
Oklahoma City Blazers (third)	Oklahoma City	CHL	1992–2009	Defunct
Oklahoma City Barons	Oklahoma City	AHL	2010–2015	Bakersfield Condors

=== Collegiate ===
==== Active ====
Team	City	League	Arena	Founded
Oklahoma Sooners	Edmond	ACHA Division 1	Arctic Edge Ice Arena	2003
Central Oklahoma Bronchos	Edmond	ACHA Division 1	Arctic Edge Ice Arena	2006
Oklahoma State Cowboys	Tulsa	ACHA Division 2	WeStreet Ice Center	2021

=== Junior ===
==== Active ====
Team	City	League	Arena	Founded
Oklahoma Warriors	Oklahoma City	NAHL	Blazers Ice Centre	2022*

==== Inactive ====
Team	City	League	Years active	Fate
Tulsa Crude	Tulsa	USHL	2001–2002	Defunct
Oklahoma City Jr. Blazers	Oklahoma City	WSHL	2014–2020	Defunct
Oklahoma City Ice Hawks	Oklahoma City	NA3HL	2020–2022	New Mexico Ice Wolves

* relocated

=== Timeline ===
Active Active (out of state)

== Players ==
location of cities

Oklahoma's history with minor league hockey had helped the state produce a few notable players despite a very low level of engagement (Only about 1,000 residents were registered with USA Hockey in 2022). Unsurprisingly, most notable players were born in and around Oklahoma City and Tulsa, the two towns that have sported established teams.

=== Notable players by city ===
==== Edmond ====
- Matt Donovan

==== Oklahoma City ====
- Dan Woodley

==== Raised Elsewhere ====
- Tyler Arnason
- Lane MacDonald
- Jon Merrill
- Burr Williams
