= Ice hockey in Utah =

- Flag of Utah
- Country: United States
- Governing body: USA Hockey
- National teams: Men's national team Women's national team
- First played: 1969

Club competitions
- List: NHL (major professional) ECHL (minor professional) USPHL (junior)

Utah has a growing interest with ice hockey in the United States.

== History ==
Utah had its first big introduction to the game with the debut of the Salt Lake Golden Eagles in 1969. The club was a member of the WHL and got off to a slow start by finishing last in the standings in this first two seasons. 1972 saw huge changes for the team as it suddenly became competitive, reaching the league championship, but it was also the beginning of the end for the league. The early 1970s saw massive amounts of westward expansion by both the National Hockey League (NHL) and World Hockey Association (WHA) that caused many teams in the WHL to fold. 1974 was the final year of operation for the WHL, however, Salt Lake was one of the teams that was still around to be absorbed by the Central Hockey League (CHL). The Eagles responded to the adversity by winning the league championship in their first season. They continued to be one of the top teams in the CHL and won two more titles in the early 80s.

By 1984, the CHL had declined to the point of bankruptcy but the Eagles still remained popular in their home town. Despite losing the backing of their then-parent club (Minnesota North Stars), the team jumped to the International Hockey League (IHL) in 1984. The new league was a step up in terms of competition, with the IHL playing just below the NHL, but the Eagles were quick on the uptake. After winning the league championship in 1987, the Eagles signed an affiliation deal with the Calgary Flames and repeated their title run the following season. In the ensuing years, however, the team began to flag in the standings and became a middling team by the mid-1990s. In 1994, Larry H. Miller, who had purchased the team in 1989, sold the Eagles to a group out of Detroit. Despite the loyal and established fanbase, the franchise was moved out of Utah before the next season.

After a year without a team, Salt Lake City welcomed its second franchise when the Utah Grizzlies arrived from Denver. The team had already won a league championship before their arrival but recommended itself the old Eagles fans by capturing the title in 1996. While the Grizzlies remained one of the better teams in the IHL for the remainder of the decade, they were unable to get any further successes in the playoffs. Despite the lack of postseason performance, attendance figured remained high with the team routinely seeing crowds above 7,000. After the IHL folded in 2001, the Grizzlies were absorbed by the American Hockey League (AHL), previously the IHL's chief rival. The team saw even less on-ice success in the early 21st century and by the middle of the first decade their fans were beginning to disappear. In 2005 the team saw its average crowd size drop below 5,000 for the first time and then suspended operations after the season.

Not willing to miss out on a ready market, a local group purchased the right to the Grizzlies name as well as a mothballed ECHL franchise and made sure that the E Center had ice hockey available for the 2005–06 season. Though they started slow, the second franchise played very consistently over the years, making the postseason for eleven consecutive years. While the team was unable to win a title in that time, the fanbase rewarded the team by seeing its attendance numbers rise from 3,800 in 2006 to over 5,600 in 2018.

During the residency of the second Grizzlies franchise, junior hockey arrived in Utah when the Ogden Mustangs relocated from California. While it was not the first junior team to call the state home, it was the first to last more than one season. The Mustangs swiftly became one of the best teams in the Western States Hockey League (WSHL), finishing either second or first in their division for seven consecutive years. In 2019 and 2020, Ogden won the league regular season title, capping off back-to-back runs to the league championship game. After the WSHL went dormant during the COVID-19 pandemic, the Mustangs left to join the United States Premier Hockey League (USPHL) and have continued their strong play.

On April 18, 2024, the NHL announced that it would sell hockey assets of the Arizona Coyotes to Utah Jazz owner and Real Salt Lake co-owner Ryan Smith, and create an expansion team known as the Utah Mammoth in Salt Lake City.

== Teams ==
=== Professional ===
==== Active ====
Team	City	League	Arena	Founded
Utah Mammoth	Salt Lake City	NHL	Delta Center	2024

==== Inactive ====
Team	City	League	Years active	Fate
Salt Lake Golden Eagles	Salt Lake City	WHL; CHL; IHL	1969–1974; 1974–1984; 1984–1994	Defunct
Utah Grizzlies	Salt Lake City	IHL; AHL	1995–2001; 2001–2005	Cleveland Monsters
Utah Grizzlies (second)	West Valley City	ECHL	†2005–2026	Trenton Ironhawks

- † relocated from elsewhere

=== Junior ===
==== Active ====
Team	City	League	Arena	Founded
Ogden Mustangs	Ogden	USPHL	The Ice Sheet at Ogden	2011†

=== Timeline ===
Active Active (out of state)

== Players ==
Location of cities

The long-time presence of professional ice hockey in Salt Lake City has helped the region build the local ice hockey community and resulted in several players of note from the state. However, the rest of the state remains largely unaffected by the game. This has resulted in Utah having a lower level of engagement (0.114% of its population is registered with USA Hockey) than most of its mountain-west neighbors.

=== Notable players by city ===
==== Draper ====
- Nick Halloran

==== Salt Lake City ====
- Daniel Brickley
- Mac Carruth
- Steve Konowalchuk
- Trevor Lewis

==== Raised elsewhere ====
- Dylan Olsen

† relocated from elsewhere.
