= Mid-Cities Junior Stars =

Mid-Cities Jr. Stars
- City: Euless, Texas
- League: NA3HL
- Division: South
- Founded: 2013
- Home arena: Children’s Health StarCenter-Euless
- Colors: Victory green, silver, black, white
- Owners: Brass Roots Hockey, LLC.
- Head coach: Chris Hille
- Affiliates: Corpus Christi IceRays (NAHL)
- Website: Jr. Stars website

Franchise history
- 2013–2015: Dallas Jr. Stars
- 2015–2017: Euless Jr. Stars
- 2017–2024: Mid-Cities Jr. Stars

The Mid-Cities Jr. Stars were a USA Hockey-sanctioned Tier III Junior ice hockey team playing in the North American 3 Hockey League (NA3HL). The team played their home games at Children's Health StarCenter in Euless, Texas.

== History ==
Established in 2013 as the Dallas Jr. Stars, the club entered the league to form a South Division along with the Topeka Capitals and Sugar Land Imperials. After a second-place finish in their inaugural regular season, the Jr. Stars (16–22–2) went on a playoff run that ended in the Silver Cup Finals. A first round series sweep against third place Sugar Land Imperials earned a spot in the division finals against Topeka Capitals. The Stars eliminated Topeka, who finished the regular season 33 points ahead of Dallas, to advance into the 2014 NA3HL Silver Cup Finals. Dallas lost all three round robin games to close their first season.

In the summer of 2015, the team announced an affiliation agreement with the Coulee Region Chill of the North American Hockey League. Shortly after the affiliation, the team was purchased by KWM Kids, Inc. led by Michelle Bryant of La Crosse, Wisconsin, and owner of the Chill. As part of the new purchase the team became the Euless Jr. Stars.

In 2017, the team was once again sold. The new owners were Brass Roots Hockey, LLC. led by Brad Allen who announced a new head coach in Tom Train and hired Tony Curtale as an advisor. The team was then re-branded as the Mid-Cities Jr. Stars for the 2017–18 season.

The team folded and ceased operations prior to the 2024–25 season.

== Season-by-season records ==
| Season | GP | W | L | OTL | Pts | GF | GA | PIM | Regular season finish | Playoffs |
|---|---|---|---|---|---|---|---|---|---|---|
| 2013–14 | 40 | 16 | 22 | 2 | 34 | 137 | 167 | 1052 | 2nd of 3, South Div. 15th of 21, NA3HL | Won Division Semifinals, 2–0 vs. Sugar Land Imperials; Won Division Finals, 2–1 vs. Topeka Capitals; Eliminated in Silver Cup Round Robin (L, 1–7 vs. North Iowa Bulls; L, 2–5 vs. Flint Jr. Generals; L, 1–8 vs. St. Louis Jr. Blues) |
| 2014–15 | 47 | 10 | 33 | 4 | 24 | 109 | 221 | 1091 | 5th of 6, South Div. 27th of 31, NA3HL | did not qualify |
| 2015–16 | 47 | 9 | 36 | 2 | 20 | 106 | 279 | 806 | 6th of 6, South Div. 31st of 34, NA3HL | did not qualify |
| 2016–17 | 47 | 23 | 20 | 4 | 50 | 195 | 191 | 1136 | 3rd of 6, South Div. 24th of 48, NA3HL | Lost Div. Semifinals, 0–2 vs. Atlanta Capitals |
| 2017–18 | 47 | 30 | 16 | 1 | 61 | 192 | 117 | 1405 | 3rd of 6, South Div. 17th of 42, NA3HL | Won Div. Semifinals, 2–0 vs. Atlanta Capitals; Lost Div. Finals, 0–2 vs. Texas Jr. Brahmas |
| 2018–19 | 47 | 21 | 24 | 2 | 44 | 188 | 154 | 876 | 4th of 5, South Div. 24th of 36, NA3HL | Lost Div. Semifinals, 0–2 vs. Texas Jr. Brahmas |
| 2019–20 | 47 | 19 | 25 | 3 | 41 | 160 | 202 | 682 | 4th of 5, South Div. 21st of 34, NA3HL | Playoffs cancelled |
| 2020–21 | 40 | 5 | 35 | 0 | 10 | 54 | 268 | 719 | 7th of 7, South Div. 31st of 31, NA3HL | did not qualify |
| 2021–22 | 47 | 10 | 37 | 0 | 20 | 124 | 307 | 1210 | 7th of 8, South Div. 30th of 34, NA3HL | did not qualify |
| 2022–23 | 47 | 2 | 44 | 1 | 5 | 78 | 350 | 1451 | 8th of 8, South Div. 34th of 34, NA3HL | did not qualify |
| 2023–24 | 47 | 9 | 38 | 0 | 0 | 78 | 349 | 701 | 7th of 8, South Div. 31st of 34, NA3HL | did not qualify |

== Alumni ==
The Jr. Stars have had a number of alumni move on to collegiate programs, higher levels of junior ice hockey in the United States and Canada.
