= Ice hockey in Kentucky =

- Flag of Kentucky
- Country: United States
- Governing body: USA Hockey
- National teams: Men's national team Women's national team
- First played: 1948

Club competitions
- List: ECHL (minor professional)

Kentucky has a negligible history with ice hockey in the United States. Several attempts have been made over the years to establish ice hockey in the state, however, all have failed within a few years.

== History ==
With its proximity to other hockey-rich states like Illinois, Missouri and Ohio, Kentucky has long been seen as a potential expansion site for several leagues, however, The Bluegrass state has rarely made any investment in the game. Starting as far back as the late 1940s, minor professional hockey has tried to find a home in Kentucky. The Louisville Blades were the first attempt, arriving as part of the IHL's major expansion in 1948. Though they won the league championship their first season, the team saw fit to leave for the USHL the following season. The Blades were far less successful in their new home, both on the ice and in the ticket booth. After finishing 6th out of 7 teams the Blades folded. A few years later, the IHL tried to make Louisville work a second time with the Louisville Shooting Stars. The Stars were terrible in their first season, finishing in 8th place and disbanded after the year. The end of the decade saw the IHL make a third attempt at the state when the Huntington Hornets moved to Louisville. The team had a winning record in its first three seasons and won the league championship in 1959, however, nothing the team did on the ice captured the interest of the fan base and the Louisville Rebels ceased to exist after their third season.

After the multiple failed teams, Kentucky was left without an established team for 30 years. It wasn't until the mass expansion of the game in the 1990s that further attempts were made. The first was with the Louisville Icehawks in 1990. As a member of the recently formed ECHL and managed to sign an affiliation deal with the Pittsburgh Penguins. Playing out of the 6,600-seat Broadbent Arena, the team looked to have all the ingredients for a successful minor league team. The first two seasons saw the team produce decent records and advance out of the first round of the postseason, however, after missing the playoffs in year three, the team tumbled down the standings and ended the year 28 games under .500. Though they managed to win their first round series that year, the team was already in dire straits financially and suspended operations after the season. The Broadbent Arena wasn't without a hockey team for long as the Louisville RiverFrogs were founded in 1995 as a second attempt by the ECHL. After a successful first season, the Frogs missed the playoffs for two consecutive years and were then sold after the 1998 season. The new owners promptly moved the team to Florida.

In the meantime, ice hockey expanded beyond the borders of Louisville when the AHL placed an expansion team in Lexington. The Kentucky Thoroughblades played out of the Rupp Arena, the home of Kentucky Wildcats basketball, but managed to achieve modest success despite their locale. As a farm team for the San Jose Sharks, the Thoroughblades saw several future NHL players pass through its roster. The success of the team on the ice helped convince the AHL to place a second team in Louisville after the departure of the RiverFrogs and the league added the Louisville Panthers in 1999. In 2000, the two played one another in the first round of the playoffs, which was hoped to be the beginning of a local rivalry that could generate interest in the sport. Unfortunately, the Panthers collapsed during their second season and after finishing dead-last in the standings the team suspended operations. The dominoes continued to fall with the Thoroughblades finishing the year with an average attendance of less than 4,500 (down from the 7,800+ they commanded in 1998) and the team moved to Cleveland.

After a year without a professional team, an ECHL team relocated to Lexington, using the Rupp Arena once more. The Lexington Men O' War had a moderately successful season but saw little promise in their gate receipts with less than 2,400 average attendance. The team went dormant after the season and later moved to Utah. As of 2023, no further attempts have been made to establish ice hockey in the state.

== Teams ==
=== Professional ===
==== Inactive ====
Team	City	League	Years active	Fate
Louisville Blades	Louisville	IHL; USHL	1948–1949; 1949–1950	Defunct
Louisville Shooting Stars	Louisville	IHL	1953–1954	Defunct
Louisville Rebels	Louisville	IHL	1957–1960	Defunct
Louisville Icehawks	Louisville	ECHL	1990–1994	Defunct
Louisville RiverFrogs	Louisville	ECHL	1995–1998	Cincinnati Cyclones
Kentucky Thoroughblades	Lexington	AHL	1996–2001	San Jose Barracuda
Louisville Panthers	Louisville	AHL	1999–2001	Texas Stars
Lexington Men O' War	Lexington	ECHL	2002–2003	Utah Grizzlies

=== Collegiate ===
==== Active ====
Team	City	League	Years active	Fate
Kentucky Wildcats	Lexington	TSCHL	1984–Present	Active
Louisville Cardinals	Louisville	TSCHL	1995–Present	Active

=== Professional Timeline ===
Active Active (out of state)

== Players ==
The dearth of ice hockey teams in the state and the near total lack of established junior programs have left Kentucky with one of the lowest engagement rates in the country. With less than 2,000 people registered as members of USA Hockey in 2023, in is the bottom fifth nationwide and is even worse when adjusted for population percentage (0.041%). Unsurprisingly, no player from Kentucky has yet to achieve any notability in the sport.
