= Ice hockey in Georgia =

- Flag of Georgia
- Country: United States
- Governing body: USA Hockey
- National teams: Men's national team Women's national team
- First played: 1972

Club competitions
- List: NCAA (college) AWHL, NA3HL, NorPac, WSHL (junior)

Georgia has seen many expansion teams at multiple levels but few have been able to establish a foothold in the public consciousness.

== History ==
One of the most southern states in the US, Georgia was largely passed over by ice hockey circles for most of the 20th century, as was most of the Deep South. It wasn't until the NHL began expanding in the late 1960s that Georgia received any attention. While the NHL had initially planned to slow down its expansion after 1970, the founding of the WHA caused the league to expedite the process. Tom Cousins, the owner of the Atlanta Hawks, purchased the rights for an expansion franchise for $6 million with the team set to begin play in 1972 at the newly built Omni Coliseum. Initially, the team was a success, making the postseason in just their second year while drawing an average of about 14,000 per game. While the Flames missed the postseason in year three, they returned for each of the next five years. During that time, Atlanta never had a losing record despite playing in what was probably the best division in the league. Unfortunately, the Flames were not able to generate any postseason success in that time. Atlanta won just 2 playoff games in 6 appearances and their lack of success caused a drag on their ticket sales. By 1978, the team was averaging less than 11,000 per game and rumors of the team's potential relocation had begun as early as 1976. A last gasp at boosting interest in the club came when then team signed Jim Craig in 1980 but attendance continued to decline. After the team's playoff exit, Cousins announced that he was selling the team after an estimated loss of $12 million over the previous 8 years. A consortium agreed to purchase the franchise for $16 million and the Flames were moved to Calgary.

During the Flames' initial success, a minor league team was founded in Macon but the Macon Whoopees were a disaster from the start. While playing in the 9,000-seat Macon Coliseum, the Whoopees played on Wednesday and Sunday nights, which were church nights in the state. The team was only able to attract 1,100 spectators for their games and by November the team wasn't able to make payroll. The team limped onward but, after forfeiting a game in January when the players refused to play without getting paid, the club was shut down for good in February when the IRS intervened.

The state was left without any established team for over a decade but ice hockey did eventually return to the Omni. In 1992, the Atlanta Knights were founded as the minor league affiliate for the newly formed Tampa Bay Lightning. In its first season, Atlanta captured an IHL division title and also showcased Manon Rhéaume in two games, making her the first woman to play in a professional hockey game. Atlanta won the league championship the next season and the sudden popularity of the game in its second stint convinced the NHL to make another attempt at one of the largest media markets in the country. The Knights played two more seasons before being forced to relocate when the Omni was demolished in 1996.

Over the next three years, the Philips Arena was built as a home for the Hawks and the new expansion team, the Atlanta Thrashers. The Thrashers were owned by Ted Turner, who had become the owner of the Hawks in the meantime, and stocked its team with promising young talent. The thrashers had poor results in their first few seasons but that allowed the team to draft highly regarded prospects Dany Heatley, Ilya Kovalchuk, and Kari Lehtonen. Unfortunately, the team was struck by tragedy when Heatley crashed his Ferrari 360 just before the start of the 2003–04 season. While Heatly would miss more than half of the year recovering from the injuries, the crash killed his teammate, Dan Snyder. The situation left a pall over the club for the entire year that was compounded by the lockout that cancelled all of the following season. The timing couldn't have been worse for the Thrashers as the team had yet to find any on-ice success and the contingent that had bought the team from Turner in 2003 was already beginning to fray.

While the Thrashers soldiered on, several attempts at establishing minor league teams were made. Macon had received a second team in 1996, also called the Whoopee but it had gone bankrupt after five years. In their immediate wake, the ECHL relocated a team from Tallahassee but the third Whoopee franchise lasted just one year before heading out of state. One final attempt at putting a team in Macon was made when the Atlantic Coast Hockey League was formed in 2002. The Macon Trax moved into the Coliseum and managed to survive for three years despite playing in three different leagues. However, by 2005 the team could no longer sustain itself and the Trax folded.

While Macon had its difficulties, another Georgia city was the target of minor league expansion. The Columbus Cottonmouths first appeared in 1996 The team saw a great deal of success in a short period of time, winning the league championship in its second season while finishing as runners-up in both 2000 and 2001. After the CHL merged with the WPHL in 2001, Columbus lost its two closest rivals (Macon and Huntsville) This led the team to apply for admission in the ECHL and, after purchasing the defunct Hampton Roads Admirals franchise, the Cottonmouths were able to continue in their new league. Unfortunately, the cost of playing in the ECHL outpaced the Cottonmouths' finances and the team was forced to relocate in 2004. That summer, the new SPHL announced that one of their inaugural teams would be the Columbus Cottonmouths, keeping an ice hockey team in the city. This Cottonmouths team responded by winning the inaugural league championship and then capturing a second 7 years later. However, by 2017, mounting losses by the team forced owners Wanda and Shelby Amos to search for a buyer. when none were forthcoming, the team suspended operations after the season.

Augusta too had its own minor league team in the Augusta Lynx after the Raleigh IceCaps relocated in 1998. Augusta saw very little success, missing the postseason nearly as often as they made it. By 2009, the team's financial situation was so poor that they were forced to suspend operations just 18 games into the season.

While Georgia was able to see some success with its minor league teams, the Thrashers were never able to get on track. After the lockout ended, Atlanta made just one playoff appearance (2007) and did't win a single postseason game. The following years proved to be disastrous for the team as not only were the owners locked into a legal battle over who owned the team but the team's best player, Kovalchuk, had turned down an $101 million contract offer and was eventually traded to New Jersey. In January 2011, reports came out that the team had lost approximately $130 million since the lockout and would need new investors. While some local groups showed interest in purchasing the team and keeping it in Atlanta, ultimately the Thrashers were sold to True North Sports & Entertainment and moved to Winnipeg.

In the wake of the Thrashers' departure, Atlanta was not bereft of professional ice hockey as the Gwinnett Gladiators had been playing in the region since 2003. The survival of the Gladiators, since rebranded 'Atlanta' has helped to spur on a second wave of minor league hockey in the state as each of the previous outposts saw further attempts at establishing a franchise. While the Augusta RiverHawks only lasted three seasons, their relocation met with more success and the Macon Mayhem were able to win the SPHL championship in 2017. The Columbus River Dragons were founded in 2019 and managed to navigate their way through the choppy waters of the COVID-19 pandemic to win a league championship in 2021. With the second wave of minor league teams appearing to be more successful, more teams were soon established. Savannah became the second ECHL team in the state when the Savannah Ghost Pirates were founded in 2022. Athens, already home to the University of Georgia collegiate hockey team, received an FPHL team, the Athens Rock Lobsters, who began play in 2024.

== Teams ==
=== Professional ===
==== Active ====
Team	City	League	Arena	Founded
Atlanta Gladiators	Duluth	ECHL	Gas South Arena	2003 ^{†}
Macon Mayhem	Macon	SPHL	Macon Coliseum	2015 ^{†}
Columbus River Dragons	Columbus	FPHL	Columbus Civic Center	2019
Savannah Ghost Pirates	Savannah	ECHL	Enmarket Arena	2022
Athens Rock Lobsters	Athens	FPHL	Akins Ford Arena	2024

==== Inactive ====
Team	City	League	Years active	Fate
Atlanta Flames	Atlanta	NHL	1972–1980	Calgary Flames
Macon Whoopees	Macon	SHL	1973–1974	Defunct
Atlanta Knights	Atlanta	IHL	1992–1996	Defunct
Macon Whoopee	Macon	CHL	1996–2001	Defunct
Columbus Cottonmouths	Columbus	CHL; ECHL	1996–2001; 2001–2004	Defunct
Augusta Lynx	Augusta	ECHL	1998–2008	Defunct
Atlanta Thrashers	Atlanta	NHL	1999–2011	Winnipeg Jets
Macon Whoopee (second)	Macon	ECHL	2001–2002	Defunct
Macon Trax	Macon	ACHL; WHA2; SPHL	2002–2003; 2003–2004; 2004–2005	Defunct
Columbus Cottonmouths (second)	Columbus	SPHL	2004–2017	Defunct
Augusta RiverHawks	Augusta	SPHL	2010–2013	Macon Mayhem

=== Junior ===
==== Active ====
Team	City	League	Arena	Founded
Atlanta Capitals	Duluth	NA3HL	Atlanta IceForum	2015 ^{†}

† relocated from elsewhere.

=== Timeline ===
Active Active (out of state)

== Players ==
Georgia, despite being the 8th most populous state in the nation, has as many players registered with USA Hockey as Nebraska in 2023. The lack of engagement with ice hockey, while endemic to the southern states, has left Georgia behind in its development of native players. Thus far, only a handful of Georgians have achieved any notability in terms of the sport but none were raised in the Peach state.

=== Notable players by city ===
==== Raised out of state ====
- Eric Chouinard
- Mark Mowers
- Jean-Marc Pelletier
- Francis Spain
- Nathan Staios

† relocated from elsewhere.
