= Ice hockey in West Virginia =

- Flag of West Virginia
- Country: United States
- Governing body: USA Hockey
- National teams: Men's national team Women's national team
- First played: 1956

Club competitions
- List: ECHL (minor professional)

West Virginia has had very little impact on ice hockey in the United States with one exception. The Wheeling Nailers have been an unqualified success for a state that might otherwise be a non-entity in ice hockey circles.

== History ==
The first team to call West Virginia home were the Huntington Hornets of the IHL. The team played in the Veterans Memorial Fieldhouse but were immediately beset by low attendance figures. Within a few months Ernie Berg, the team's owner, was already looking for a new home and the Hornets lasted just one season. The state was largely ignored over the succeeding 30 years but a second attempt was finally made in the early 1990s. The Winston-Salem Thunderbirds relocated to Wheeling and became the Wheeling Thunderbirds. The team debuted in 1992 and promptly advanced to the league finals. The immediate success helped the team establish itself in its new home and begin to build a following. Due to a trademark dispute with the Seattle Thunderbirds, the team changed its name to 'Nailers' in 1996 but the biggest change was yet to come. In 1998, the franchise signed an affiliation deal with the Pittsburgh Penguins that helped stabilize their finances. The team has seen some success over the years and they have remained a consistent (albeit low) draw at the WesBanco Arena.

A year after the arrival of the Thunderbirds, a second ECHL team was founded in Huntington. The Huntington Blizzard weren't nearly as successful as their northern counterparts and saw just one winning season in the first six campaigns. The novelty of the team quickly wore off as attendance dropped from 3,700+ in the first two years to the low 2,000s afterwards. The team was finally able to achieve some success in their seventh year but by then it was too late. The team folded in 2000 and was later moved to Texas.

Despite the demise of the Blizzard, having two minor-league teams in the state helped to convince some of the local high schools to sponsor varsity hockey. Beginning with Wheeling Park High School in 1995 with Jay Davis and Eric Evanko coaching the first team, high school hockey has slowly taken hold in the state. Due to the few number of teams that played, most competed in other states' leagues, notably Pennsylvania, but in 2018 that began to change. That year the West Virginia Hockey League was formed to increase the presence of the teams in the state. While most still play in external leagues during the regular season, they convene a few times each year and compete for a state championship.

== Teams ==
=== Professional ===
==== Active ====
Team	City	League	Arena	Founded
Wheeling Nailers	Wheeling	ECHL	WesBanco Arena	1992 *

==== Inactive ====
Team	City	League	Years active	Fate
Huntington Hornets	Huntington	IHL	1956–1957	Defunct
Huntington Blizzard	Huntington	ECHL	1993–2000	Defunct

* Relocated from elsewhere

=== Timeline ===
Active Active (out of state) --->

== Players ==
location of cities

Only a few West Virginia natives have achieved any notability in the sports but only one was raised in the Mountain State.

- Kristin Lewicki attended Adrian College, a Division III school, but played so well that she was able to sign with the Buffalo Beauts after her graduation in 2017.

=== Notable players by city ===
==== Moundsville ====
- Kristin Lewicki

==== Raised out of state ====
- Bryan Ewing
- Cyrus Vance
- Peter Laviolette III
