= Ice hockey in Mississippi =

- Flag of Mississippi
- Country: United States
- Governing body: USA Hockey
- National teams: Men's national team Women's national team
- First played: 1996

Club competitions
- List: FPHL (minor professional)

Mississippi has a history with ice hockey in the United States. Though a few teams have attempted to call the state home since the 1990s, few have met with any success.

== History ==
Like many other states in the Deep South, Mississippi did not see its first official ice hockey team until the 1990s. The rise and expansion of the ECHL brought the Mississippi Sea Wolves into being in 1996 and the team saw some interest from the locals. After two seasons, the attendance figures began to dwindle but the team put together a tremendous season and won the league championship in 1999. Despite the title, and continued success on the ice, the Sea Wolves dropped from over 6,000 per game in the 90s to just over 3,000 in 2003. Even with their attendance halved, the team soldiered on and began to see slight improvements in the mid-2000. However, the destruction brought by Hurricane Katrina in 2005 damaged the team's home rink, the Mississippi Coast Coliseum. The franchise was forced to go dormant for two years while it was repaired but the Sea Wolves did finally return in 2007.

While the team saw modest crowds that year, their poor performance began to see the attendance dwindle and by the end of their second year back the financial situation was no longer tenable. After the team folded in 2009, the SPHL decided to try its hand at in the region and founded the Mississippi Surge. The new team played in the same arena as the Sea Wolves and started off similarly as well. The Surge won the league championship in its second season but, just like the previous franchise, they weren't able to get the locals to buy in after the title. The Surge managed to hang on for five years but, with low attendance figures in each season, the team ceased in 2014. After the Surge were sold and moved to Virginia, the coast region was left without a hockey team for eight years. That void was finally filled by the arrival of the Federal Prospects Hockey League, a single-A minor league, who brought back the Mississippi Sea Wolves. While the new team had no formal connection with the earlier club, they used a similar color scheme and tried to back on local nostalgia to help the new franchise.

A few years after the original Sea Wolves began, a second ECHL team appeared when a franchise relocated and became the Jackson Bandits. The team had a difficult start but began to perform well in its second season, finishing second in their division. After a second good season in 2002, Bernard Ebbers sold the team after he was forced to resign as CEO of WoldCom during an investigation that would eventually lead to his conviction for fraud. While the new owners had nothing to do with Ebbers, the team suddenly saw its attendance figures drop to almost half of what they had been in 2000. With the Bandits unable to sustain themselves, and the prospect of a new arena fleeting, the franchise folded after the year.

In the far northern reaches of the state, two different attempts were made at placing a hockey team in Mississippi. The Tupelo T-Rex began play in 1998 as members of the WPHL. The team played well enough to be invited to join the CHL in 2001 when the two leagues merged but the team's owners declined. The CHL responded by exerting a non-compete clause that was part of the merger, barring the T-Rex from playing in the region for the next five years. In order to get around this problem, the team reorganized as a junior team but those efforts only lasted for two seasons. In 2003 an attempt was made to circumvent the CHL clause by joining the newly-formed ACHL, however, the league had its own troubles and was unwilling to get into a legal fight with the CHL.

Part of the reason for the animosity from the CHL was that one of its founding teams, the Memphis RiverKings, had moved a few miles south in 2000 and were then located in northwestern Mississippi. They had hoped that the inclusion of the T-Rex would give the two a geographic rivalry that would increase fan interest but the WPHL franchise ruined those plans. Instead, the team that would eventually become the Mississippi RiverKings soldiered on by itself and became one of the top teams in the league. They won the league championship in 2002 and 2003 and saw modest but consistent crowds for over a decade in the Magnolia State. Unfortunately, the CHL began to have financial problems after the Great Recession and the RiverKings decided to jump to the SPHL in 2011. While their new league continued after the collapse of the CHL in 2014, the RiverKings saw their crowds shrink to just over 2,200 per game. The loss in revenue forced the team to suspend operations in 2018 and, while no official word was ever given, the franchise is effectively defunct.

At the collegiate level, the first hockey team to be associated with a university was located at Mississippi State University. A club sports team, it competed at the Division III tier of the American Collegiate Hockey Association. Operations were halted as a result of COVID-19 struggles but have since resumed as of 2025.

== Teams ==
=== Professional ===
==== Active ====
Team	City	League	Arena	Founded
Mississippi Sea Wolves (second)	Biloxi	FPHL	Mississippi Coast Coliseum	2022

==== Inactive ====
Team	City	League	Years active	Fate
Mississippi Sea Wolves	Biloxi	ECHL	1996–2005, 2007–2009	Defunct
Tupelo T-Rex	Tupelo	WPHL	1998–2001	Defunct
Jackson Bandits	Jackson	ECHL	1999–2003*	Defunct
Mississippi RiverKings	Southaven	CHL; SPHL	2000–2011*; 2011–2018	Defunct
Mississippi Surge	Biloxi	SPHL	2009–2014	Roanoke Rail Yard Dawgs

=== Junior ===
==== Inactive ====
Team	City	League	Years active	Fate
Tupelo T-Rex	Tupelo	AWHL	2001–2003	Defunct

* Relocated from elsewhere

=== Collegiate ===
==== Active ====
Team	City	League	Arena	Founded
Mississippi State University	Starkville	ACHA	Cadence Bank Arena	2008

=== Timeline ===
Active Active (out of state)

== Players ==
location of cities

Mississippi has one of the lowest engagement rates in the nation with just 0.008% of residents registered with USA Hockey as of 2022. That year, Mississippi had the least number of registered players in the nation (260). Despite this, the Magnolia State does have one home-grown player of note. Reagan Rust was introduced to the game in a local league organized by the Mississippi RiverKings and had to make 12-hour commutes to participate in an elite ice hockey program in Pittsburgh. Despite the difficulties, she was able to earn a scholarship to play NCAA Division I and later became the first Mississippi resident to play major professional ice hockey.

=== Notable players by city ===
==== Southaven ====
- Reagan Rust

==== Raised out of state ====
- Mathieu Olivier
