= Rob Harris (ice hockey) =

American ice hockey player

Personal information
- Nationality: American
- Born: December 4, 1953 (age 72) Omaha, Nebraska, United States

Sport
- Sport: Ice hockey

Rob Harris (born December 4, 1953) is an American ice hockey player. He competed in the men's tournament at the 1976 Winter Olympics. Harris also won a national championship with Minnesota in 1974.
