= Ames/ISU Ice Arena =

Ice arena in Ames, Iowa

Coordinates: 42.00922°N 93.65084°W

- Interactive map of Ames/ISU Ice Arena
- Location: Ames, Iowa
- Owner: Ames Parks & Rec Department and Iowa State University
- Operator: Parks & Rec Department
- Capacity: 1,000 (Ice hockey)
- Surface: 200' x 85' (Ice hockey)

Construction
- Opened: 2001
- Architect: RDG Bussard Dikis

Tenants
- Cyclones Men & Women Hockey Teams; Synchronized Skating Team

Ames/ISU Ice Arena is an ice arena and recreational sport facility located in Ames, Iowa and owned and operated by Ames Parks & Rec Department and Iowa State University. The Ames / ISU Ice Arena is home to the Iowa State University Cyclones Men’s and Women's Hockey Teams, ISU Synchronized Skating Team. The ISU Men's Hockey Team competes at the ACHA Division I level in the Central States Collegiate Hockey League, in addition an auxiliary team competes at the ACHA D II level as members of the North Central Collegiate Hockey Association. ISU Women's Hockey competes as an independent team in the ACHA Women's Division II level.

In addition the arena is used by several local high school ice hockey teams(including the hosting of the MHSHL Championship Tournament each spring), youth, and adult rec. ice hockey leagues, Ames Figure Skating Club, and Iowa State intramural activities, as well as public skating. Each summer, the arena hosts the USA Hockey Central District High Performance camp, where top hockey players age 14 and under as well as nominated high-level officials from across the Midwest participate in a week of games, classroom and off-ice training, and social activities. Players and officials stay in ISU dorms during the camp and are allowed to explore the campus and downtown Ames during their free time.

== Facility ==
The City of Ames and Iowa State University jointly constructed the facility, which opened in 2001. It features an NHL regulation ice sheet for ice hockey, figure skating and open skating, and local high school hockey . The arena is equipped with eight locker rooms, two of which are designated to ISU, officials and other programs. The current capacity for spectators is about 1,000. The arena was built to allow for possible expansion.
