= Georgetown Hoyas men's ice hockey =

- University: Georgetown University
- First season: 1939–40
- Arena: Washington, D.C.
- Colors: Blue and gray

The Georgetown Hoyas men's ice hockey team is a college ice hockey program that represents Georgetown University. They are a member of the American Collegiate Hockey Association. The university sponsored varsity ice hockey from 1939 to 1949.

== History ==
In the 1930s students at Georgetown attempted to form an ice hockey team by flooding the tennis courts. Unfortunately, weather conditions were far too warm for the endeavor to succeed and any such plans were shelved until a more suitable arrangement could be made. The school had to wait until 1938 when the Riverside Stadium opened and an informal team was formed. The club's success in its first year led the school to eventually recognize the team for the 1939–40-year and Georgetown played its first official game on February 12, 1940.

In 1941 the larger Uline Arena opened and the team moved to a new home. With the change of venue, the team responded by going undefeated and raising the profile of the program. The prospects for the team's 4th season were high, however, there was a major hang-up. Due to the effects of the United States entry into World War II, The Hoyas had trouble getting access to the Uline Arena and ended up having to cancel their entire 1943 season. The team remained mothballed until 1946–47 but, once they got back on the ice, they seemed to pick up right where they left off.

While there was renewed hope for the team, the viability of the program was harmed by forces beyond their control. Despite a small number of nearby opponents, the team was able to continue until 1949. Unfortunately, that year the Washington Lions folded. As a result, Uline Arena curtailed its ice availability and was only open for public skating on Sunday. Without a rink to use, the school had little choice but to suspend operations.

Georgetown did eventually return to the ice once other rinks were opened in the area. However, the school has never seen fit to return the team to varsity status (as of 2023).
