= Atlanta Capitals =

- City: Duluth, Georgia
- League: NA3HL
- Division: South
- Founded: 2013
- Home arena: Atlanta IceForum
- Colors: Navy blue, red, white
- General manager: Chris Powers
- Head coach: John Bowkus
- Affiliates: Odessa Jackalopes (NAHL)

Franchise history
- 2013–2015: Topeka Capitals
- 2015–present: Atlanta Capitals

The Atlanta Capitals are an American Tier III ice hockey team in the North American 3 Hockey League's South Division. The team's home arena is the Atlanta IceForum in Duluth, Georgia.

== History ==
The franchise was established in 2013 as the Topeka Capitals and played two seasons out of the 7,777-seat Landon Arena.

Led by GM/head coach Anthony Bohn, the Capitals captured the South Division title in their first season. After three seasons with the Capitals Bohn would move on to the Aberdeen Wings (NAHL) as an assistant. In 2018 Bohn was named assistant coach of the Maine Mariners of the ECHL. In 2020 Bohn was named head coach of the Danbury Hat Tricks (FPHL), but the Hat Tricks sat out the season due to COVID-19 restrictions. Bohn moved back to the NAHL in 2021 as the first head coach of the new El Paso Rhinos.

With stalled negotiations for a lease renewal, team owner, Don Stone moved to the Atlanta, Georgia, metro area in 2015 to meet the league deadline for a confirmed facility. The team began playing out of the Center Ice Arena in Sandy Springs, Georgia.

In the 2018–19 season, the team played home games at the Atlanta IceForum in Duluth.

== Season-by-season records ==
Season	GP	W	L	OTL	Pts	GF	GA	PIM	Regular season finish	Playoffs
Topeka Capitals
2013–14	45	33	11	1	67	229	135	1,323	1st of 3, South; 4th of 21, NA3HL	Div. Semifinals Bye; Lost Div. Finals, 1–2 vs. Dallas Jr. Stars
2014–15	47	30	13	4	64	199	134	903	2nd of 6, South; 9th of 31, NA3HL	Lost Div. Semifinals, 0–2 vs. Texas Jr. Brahmas
Atlanta Capitals
2015–16	47	35	10	2	72	269	129	824	3rd of 6, South; 7th of 34, NA3HL	Lost Div. Semifinals, 1–2 vs. Texas Jr. Brahmas
2016–17	47	36	10	1	73	243	111	994	2nd of 6, South; 7th of 48, NA3HL	Won Div. Semifinals, 2–0 vs. Euless Junior Stars; Won Div. Finals, 2–0 vs. Texas Jr. Brahmas; 1–2–0, 4th of 4 in Silver Cup round-robin Pool A (L, 2–4 vs. Jr. Blues; W, 3–2 vs. Jets; L, 2–6 vs. Lumberjacks)
2017–18	47	29	14	4	62	198	114	1,290	2nd of 6, South; 16th of 42, NA3HL	Lost Div. Semifinals, 0–2 vs. Mid-Cities Junior Stars
2018–19	47	26	17	4	56	191	130	1,081	3rd of 5, South; 17th of 36, NA3HL	Won Div. Semifinals, 2–0 vs. Louisiana Drillers; Lost Div. Finals, 0–2 vs. Texas Jr. Brahmas
2019–20	47	22	19	6	50	175	163	976	2nd of 5, South; 17th of 34, NA3HL	Playoffs cancelled
2020–21	40	22	16	2	46	154	118	889	4th of 7, South; 13th of 31, NA3HL	Lost Div. Semifinals, 0–2 vs. Texas Jr. Brahmas
2021–22	47	13	33	1	27	143	262	918	6th of 8, South; 27th of 34, NA3HL	Did not qualify for post season play
2022–23	47	24	19	4	52	199	170	950	5th of 8, South; 19th of 34, NA3HL	Did not qualify for post season play
2023–24	47	20	23	4	44	144	168	623	6th of 8, South; 13th of 34, NA3HL	Did not qualify for post season play
2024–25	47	11	35	1	23	105	269	1165	7th of 8, South; 33th of 35, NA3HL	Did not qualify for post season play
2025–26	44	8	36	0	16	105	269	1165	6th of 6, Southeast; 38th of 38, NA3HL	Did not qualify for post season play
