= 2017–18 USPHL Premier season =

- League: United States Premier Hockey League; Premier
- Sport: Ice hockey
- Duration: Regular season September 2017 – February 2018; Postseason; March 2018
- Games: 44–43
- Teams: 44

Regular season
- Season champions: Charlotte Rush
- Top scorer: Jory McWilliams (Tampa Bay Juniors)

USPHL Premier Playoffs
- Finals champions: Hampton Roads Whalers
- Runners-up: Charlotte Rush

USPHL Premier seasons
- ← 2016–17 2018–19 →

The 2017–18 USPHL Premier season was the 5th season of the Premier Division of the United States Premier Hockey League (USPHL) and first as the league's secondary level. This is the first year that the USPHL operated without sanctioning from USA Hockey and became an entirely independent league. The regular season ran from September 2017 to February 2018 with an unbalanced schedule. The Charlotte Rush won the regular season championship and reached the league final where they were defeated by the Hampton Roads Whalers 3–2.

== League reorganization ==
In October of 2016, the USPHL announced that they were founding a new Tier II league that would begin play the following September. Seven teams from the Premier Division (Boston Junior Bruins, Connecticut Jr. Rangers, Islanders Hockey Club, New Jersey Hitmen, P.A.L. Jr. Islanders, South Shore Kings and Syracuse Stars) expressed interest in joining the new league alongside four other junior clubs. Despite USA Hockey rejecting the USPHL's petition for sanctioning, the league went ahead with their plans and withdrew entirely from USA Hockey oversight.

Rather than leave Tier III hockey, the seven Premier Division members would each found separate programs and operate in both leagues beginning with this season. Additionally, the league reorganized its entire structure. The new league, (National Collegiate Development Conference) would now operate as the USPHL's flagship series with the Premier league taking a subsidiary role. Lower leagues, particularly the United States Premier 3 Hockey League and the USPHL Midwest, were remade or discontinued, forcing the teams in those circuits to either disband or find new homes. Many of the franchises elected to promote their junior clubs to the Premier Division, causing the Tier III circuit to swell from 10 members to more than 40 virtually overnight.

== Member changes ==
- After two years in the league, the Okanagan European Eagles, a travel team that had been operating out of the Foxboro Sports Center, withdrew from the USPHL.
- The Philadelphia Jr. Flyers, also called 'Philadelphia Flyers Elite' agreed to sell their program to the Lightning Hockey Club. The team relocated and were to be called the 'Delaware Lightning', however, the team was removed from the USPHL prior to this season.
- The P.A.L. Jr. Islanders and South Shore Kings each promoted both of their extant teams (Premier and Elite Divisions) one level (Premier joined NCDC while Elite joined Premier). While this had no practical difference for the Premier Division, both organizations swapped one of the franchises for another prior to this season.
- The Rochester Monarchs organization promoted their Elite Division team to the NCDC and founded a second Premier Division franchise, both of which began play this season.
- The Premier Division added the New York Aviators as an expansion team from an already-extant Elite Division franchise.
- The Premier Division added the Chicago Cougars, Dells Ducks, Detroit Fighting Irish, Kalkaska Rhinos, Minnesota Moose, Minnesota Mullets, Steele County Blades, Wisconsin Rapids RiverKings from the USPHL's Elite Division.
- The Premier Division added the Atlanta Jr. Knights, Carolina Eagles, Charlotte Rush, Daytona Racers, Decatur Blaze, Florida Eels, Florida Jr. Blades, Hampton Roads Whalers, Ironwood Fighting Yoopers, Jersey Shore Whalers, Motor City Hawks, Palm Beach Hawks, Potomac Patriots, Richmond Generals, Tampa Bay Juniors, Tri-City Ice Hawks, from the USP3HL.
- The Premier Division added the Boston Bandits, Connecticut Nighthawks, Hartford Jr. Wolfpack, New Hampshire Junior Monarchs, New Jersey Rockets, Northern Cyclones, from the Eastern Hockey League's Premier Division.
- On March 23, 2017, the Skipjacks Hockey Club were approved as an expansion franchise.
- On April 13, 2017, the Wisconsin Muskies were approved as an expansion franchise.
- On May 18, 2017, the Hudson Havoc were approved as an expansion franchise.
- On June 14, 2017, the Minnesota Blue Ox were approved as an expansion franchise.

== Regular season ==
The standings at the end of the regular season were as follows:

Note: x = clinched playoff berth; y = clinched division title; z = clinched regular season title

=== Standings ===
==== Florida Division ====
Team	GP	W	L	OTL	Pts	GF	GA
xy – Tampa Bay Juniors	44	30	13	1	61	231	168
x – Florida Eels	44	27	15	2	56	199	152
x – Palm Beach Hawks	44	20	20	4	44	182	191
x – Florida Jr. Blades	44	18	22	4	40	154	177
Daytona Racers	44	8	36	0	16	155	262

==== Mid-Atlantic Division ====
Team	GP	W	L	OTL	Pts	GF	GA
xy – New Jersey Rockets	44	35	5	4	74	221	114
x – Skipjacks Hockey Club	44	27	10	7	61	176	137
x – New Jersey Hitmen	44	25	16	3	53	160	142
x – New York Aviators	44	21	16	7	49	202	189
x – Jersey Shore Whalers	44	22	20	2	46	158	186
x – Connecticut Nighthawks	44	14	22	8	36	128	164
x – Connecticut Jr. Rangers	44	15	25	4	34	155	203
x – Hartford Jr. Wolfpack	44	10	33	1	21	117	221
P.A.L. Jr. Islanders	44	6	38	0	12	96	270

==== Midwest East Division ====
Team	GP	W	L	OTL	Pts	GF	GA
xy – Chicago Cougars	44	30	11	2	62	176	104
x – Motor City Hawks	44	20	22	2	42	166	208
x – Detroit Fighting Irish	43	18	22	3	39	156	162
x – Kalkaska Rhinos	44	15	28	1	31	123	135
x – Decatur Blaze	44	13	29	2	28	114	176
x – Tri-City Ice Hawks	44	5	37	2	12	82	324

Note: Kalkaska withdrew from the league on January 28th due to a lack of players and forfeited their final 9 games.

==== Midwest West Division ====
Team	GP	W	L	OTL	Pts	GF	GA
xy – Minnesota Moose	44	37	5	2	76	236	94
x – Wisconsin Rapids RiverKings	44	33	10	1	67	193	86
x – Minnesota Blue Ox	44	31	10	3	65	182	136
x – Minnesota Mullets	44	26	15	3	55	165	122
x – Wisconsin Muskies	44	22	18	4	48	148	236
x – Ironwood Fighting Yoopers	43	16	25	2	34	164	208
x – Steele County Blades	44	15	25	4	34	129	174
x – Dells Ducks	44	15	26	3	33	109	173
Hudson Havoc	44	8	34	2	18	87	219

==== North Division ====
Team	GP	W	L	OTL	Pts	GF	GA
xy – New Hampshire Junior Monarchs	44	35	8	1	71	218	100
x – Islanders Hockey Club	44	29	9	6	64	179	113
x – Syracuse Stars	44	30	12	2	62	198	135
x – South Shore Kings	44	27	11	6	60	177	109
x – Boston Bandits	44	26	15	3	55	151	124
x – Northern Cyclones	44	25	16	3	53	156	125
x – Springfield Pics	44	25	18	1	51	149	144
x – Rochester Monarchs	44	22	20	2	46	169	145
Boston Junior Bruins	44	16	23	5	37	123	193

==== Southeast Division ====
Team	GP	W	L	OTL	Pts	GF	GA
xyz – Charlotte Rush	44	40	2	2	82	280	76
x – Hampton Roads Whalers	44	30	13	1	61	166	102
x – Carolina Eagles	44	26	17	1	53	131	132
x – Richmond Generals	44	23	19	2	48	145	149
Atlanta Jr. Knights	44	20	19	5	45	155	159
Potomac Patriots	44	11	31	2	24	105	226

== Premier Division playoffs ==
=== Divisional Round ===
Teams are reseeded after the quarterfinal rounds.

==== Florida ====
Semifinals (Best-of-3)
1	Tampa Bay Juniors	2
4	Florida Jr. Blades	0
2	Florida Eels	2
3	Palm Beach Hawks	1

Note: * denotes overtime period(s)

==== Mid-Atlantic ====
Quarterfinals (Best-of-3)
1	New Jersey Rockets	2
8	Hartford Jr. Wolfpack	1
2	Skipjacks Hockey Club	0
7	Connecticut Jr. Rangers	2
3	New Jersey Hitmen	2
6	Connecticut Nighthawks	0
4	New York Aviators	2
5	Jersey Shore Whalers	0

Semifinals (Best-of-3)
1	New Jersey Rockets	2
4	Connecticut Jr. Rangers	0
2	New Jersey Hitmen	0
3	New York Aviators	2

Note: * denotes overtime period(s)

==== Midwest East ====
Quarterfinals (Best-of-3)			Semifinals (Best-of-3)
			1	Chicago Cougars	2
5	Decatur Blaze	2	5	Decatur Blaze	0
6	Tri-City Ice Hawks	0
			2	Motor City Hawks	2
			3	Detroit Fighting Irish	1

Note: * denotes overtime period(s)

==== Midwest West ====
Quarterfinals (Best-of-3)
1	Minnesota Moose	2
8	Dells Ducks	0
2	Wisconsin Rapids RiverKings	2
7	Steele County Blades	0
3	Minnesota Blue Ox	2
6	Ironwood Fighting Yoopers	0
4	Minnesota Mullets	2
5	Wisconsin Muskies	1

Semifinals (Best-of-3)
1	Minnesota Moose	2
4	Minnesota Mullets	0
2	Wisconsin Rapids RiverKings	2
3	Minnesota Blue Ox	0

Note: * denotes overtime period(s)

==== New England ====
Quarterfinals (Best-of-3)
1	New Hampshire Junior Monarchs	2
8	Rochester Monarchs	0
2	Islanders Hockey Club	2
7	Springfield Pics	1
3	Syracuse Stars	1
6	Northern Cyclones	2
4	South Shore Kings	2
5	Boston Bandits	0

Semifinals (Best-of-3)
1	New Hampshire Junior Monarchs	1
6	Northern Cyclones	2
2	Islanders Hockey Club	2
4	South Shore Kings	1

Note: * denotes overtime period(s)

==== Southeast ====
Semifinal (Best-of-3)
1	Charlotte Rush	2
4	Richmond Generals	0
2	Hampton Roads Whalers	2
3	Carolina Eagles	0

Note: * denotes overtime period(s)

=== National Round ===
The 12 qualifying teams were sorted into two separate pools for Round Robin play with each pool subdivided into two brackets. Each team would play the other two within the same bracket as well as one from the other bracket in the same pool.

The top team from each pool would advance to the Championship round.

==== Round Robin ====
Black Pool

Bracket A
Charlotte Rush	New Jersey Hitmen	Motor City Hawks

Bracket B
Florida Eels	Islanders Hockey Club	Wisconsin Rapids RiverKings

		CHA	NJH	MCH	FLE	IHC	WRR
1	Charlotte Rush		6–0	14–1	8–1		
2	New Jersey Hitmen	0–6		6–0			2–1
3	Motor City Hawks	1–14	0–6			3–4	
4	Florida Eels	1–8				1–5	—
5	Islanders Hockey Club			4–3	5–1		2–0
6	Wisconsin Rapids RiverKings		1–2		—	0–2	

Bracket A

Rank	Team	W	L	T	Pts	GF	GA
1	Charlotte Rush	3	0	0	6	28	2
2	New Jersey Hitmen	2	1	0	4	8	7
3	Motor City Hawks	0	3	0	0	4	24

Bracket B

Rank	Team	W	L	T	Pts	GF	GA
1	Islanders Hockey Club	3	0	0	6	11	4
2	Wisconsin Rapids RiverKings	0	2	0	0	1	4
3	Florida Eels	0	2	0	0	2	13

Note: the match between the Wisconsin Rapids RiverKings and Florida Eels was cancelled due to both teams being eliminated from contention.

Gold Pool

Bracket A
Chicago Cougars	Hampton Roads Whalers	New Jersey Rockets

Bracket B
Minnesota Moose	Northern Cyclones	Tampa Bay Juniors

		CHC	HRW	NJR	MNM	TBJ	NOR
1	Chicago Cougars		2–10	2–6			—
2	Hampton Roads Whalers	10–2		—		6–1	
3	New Jersey Rockets	6–2	—		7–1		
4	Minnesota Moose			1–7		4–1	7–5
5	Tampa Bay Juniors		1–6		1–4		3–2
6	Northern Cyclones	—			5–7	2–3	

Bracket A

Rank	Team	W	L	T	Pts	GF	GA
1	Hampton Roads Whalers	2	0	0	4	16	3
2	New Jersey Rockets	2	0	0	4	13	3
3	Chicago Cougars	0	2	0	0	4	16

Note: the match between the Hampton Roads Whalers and New Jersey Rockets was cancelled due to the Rockets being unable to participate.

Bracket B

Rank	Team	W	L	T	Pts	GF	GA
1	Minnesota Moose	2	1	0	4	12	13
2	Tampa Bay Juniors	1	2	0	2	5	12
3	Northern Cyclones	0	2	0	0	7	10

Note: the match between the Northern Cyclones and Chicago Cougars was cancelled due to both teams being eliminated from contention.

==== Championship round ====
Semifinals
BA	Charlotte Rush	5
GB	Minnesota Moose	2
GA	Hampton Roads Whalers	2
BB	Islanders Hockey Club	1

Championship
BA	Charlotte Rush	2
GA	Hampton Roads Whalers	3

Note: * denotes overtime period(s)
