= 2018–19 USPHL Premier season =

- League: United States Premier Hockey League; Premier
- Sport: Ice hockey
- Duration: Regular season September 7, 2018 – February 24, 2019; Postseason; March 2019
- Games: 44–4
- Teams: 52

Regular season
- Season champions: Metro Jets
- Top scorer: Brandon Osmundson (Hampton Roads Whalers)

USPHL Premier Playoffs
- Finals champions: Hampton Roads Whalers
- Runners-up: Metro Jets

USPHL Premier seasons
- ← 2017–18 2019–20 →

The 2018–19 USPHL Premier season was the 6th season of the Premier Division of the United States Premier Hockey League (USPHL). The regular season ran from September 7, 2018 to February 24, 2019 with an unbalanced schedule. The Metro Jets won the regular season championship and reached the league final where they were defeated by the Hampton Roads Whalers 5–2.

== Member changes ==
- On December 1, 2017, the Twin City Thunder were approved as an expansion team to the Premier Division for this season.
- On March 10, the USPHL approved the addition of the Philadelphia Hockey Club as an expansion team for this season.
- Five days later, the Wisconsin Muskies announced that their home rink, the Spooner Civic Center, had terminated the team's lease. The Muskies were unable to find a new home and folded before the start of this season.
- On April 19, the USPHL approved the entry of the entire NA3HL Great Lakes Division into the Premier Division. The teams were the Lansing Wolves, Metro Jets, Pittsburgh Vengeance, Southern Tier Xpress, Toledo Cherokee and Wooster Oilers. Additionally, the Jets' development team, called the Metro Jets Development Program, also joined the Premier Division as well.
- Shortly afterwards, the Southern Tier Xpress were sold to the owner of the Lake Erie Eagles. The team relocated to Erie Pennsylvania and were renamed as the Lake Erie Bighorns. However, just before the start of the season, the Bighorns were forced to suspend operations due to a lack of players and insufficient recruiting time.
- In May, the Kasson Vipers and Niagara Falls Thunder were added as an additional expansion teams.
- Over the summer, the Midwest Blackhawks returned from their two-year hiatus and promoted their program from the Elite Division to the Premier Division.
- In the offseason, the Atlanta Jr. Knights rebranded as the Atlanta Kings, the Motor City Hawks rebranded as the Motor City Hockey Club, while the Daytona Racers rebranded as the DME Swamp Rabbits.
- Additionally, the Ironwood Fighting Yoopers relocated and became the Rum River Mallards.
- Before the start of the season, the P.A.L. Jr. Islanders suspended play for the season. They would return to league for the following season.
- On October 8, the Palm Beach Hawks withdrew from the league after playing just 4 games (all losses). The organization folded shortly afterwards.

== Regular season ==
The standings at the end of the regular season were as follows:

Note: x = clinched playoff berth; y = clinched division title; z = clinched regular season title

=== Standings ===
==== Florida Division ====
Team	GP	W	L	OTL	Pts	GF	GA
xy – DME Swamp Rabbits	44	30	11	3	63	171	105
x – Florida Eels	44	28	13	3	59	208	121
x – Tampa Bay Juniors	44	15	24	5	35	121	165
x – Florida Jr. Blades	44	10	31	3	23	90	187
Palm Beach Hawks	4	0	4	0	0	6	47

==== Great Lakes Division ====
Team	GP	W	L	OTL	Pts	GF	GA
xyz – Metro Jets	44	39	4	1	79	197	79
x – Pittsburgh Vengeance	44	26	12	6	58	158	109
x – Metro Jets Development Program	44	27	17	0	54	175	119
x – Lansing Wolves	44	23	18	3	49	140	151
Wooster Oilers	44	16	25	3	35	113	153
Toledo Cherokee	44	13	28	3	29	111	170

==== Mid-Atlantic Division ====
Team	GP	W	L	OTL	Pts	GF	GA
xy – New York Aviators	44	34	6	4	72	255	116
x – Skipjacks Hockey Club	44	29	11	4	62	172	108
x – New Jersey Hitmen	43	26	13	4	56	148	120
x – New Jersey Rockets	43	21	20	2	44	124	150
x – Philadelphia Hockey Club	43	14	26	3	31	121	191
x – Jersey Shore Whalers	43	9	27	7	25	109	198

==== Midwest East Division ====
Team	GP	W	L	OTL	Pts	GF	GA
xy – Chicago Cougars	44	28	14	2	58	201	118
x – Motor City Hockey Club	44	26	18	0	52	177	134
x – Midwest Blackbirds	44	17	25	2	36	139	178
x – Decatur Blaze	44	17	26	1	35	153	167
x – Detroit Fighting Irish	44	9	33	2	20	90	268
x – Tri-City Ice Hawks	44	2	39	3	7	79	346

==== Midwest West Division ====
Team	GP	W	L	OTL	Pts	GF	GA
xy – Minnesota Moose	44	32	12	0	64	205	98
x – Hudson Havoc	44	31	11	2	64	180	97
x – Wisconsin Rapids RiverKings	44	29	14	1	59	163	103
x – Minnesota Blue Ox	44	25	17	2	52	191	145
x – Rum River Mallards	42	25	16	1	51	170	108
x – Minnesota Mullets	44	22	19	3	47	155	145
x – Dells Ducks	43	18	23	2	38	124	156
x – Kasson Vipers	43	10	31	2	22	110	249
Steele County Blades	44	6	38	0	12	59	213

==== New England Division ====
Team	GP	W	L	OTL	Pts	GF	GA
xy – Northern Cyclones	44	34	6	4	72	177	95
x – Boston Bandits	44	33	7	4	70	145	88
x – South Shore Kings	44	28	14	2	58	140	124
x – New Hampshire Junior Monarchs	44	27	14	3	57	155	108
x – Islanders Hockey Club	44	25	14	5	55	128	108
x – Twin City Thunder	44	21	17	6	48	147	136
Boston Junior Bruins	44	16	22	6	38	125	157

==== Northeast Division ====
Team	GP	W	L	OTL	Pts	GF	GA
xy – Connecticut Nighthawks	44	28	11	5	61	163	111
x – Springfield Pics	44	24	17	3	51	139	105
x – Syracuse Stars	44	21	18	5	47	147	141
x – Connecticut Jr. Rangers	44	19	21	4	42	171	203
x – Niagara Falls Thunder	44	17	25	2	36	121	150
x – Rochester Monarchs	44	11	30	3	25	113	192
Hartford Jr. Wolfpack	44	11	31	2	24	108	198

==== Southeast Division ====
Team	GP	W	L	OTL	Pts	GF	GA
xy – Hampton Roads Whalers	43	37	5	1	75	188	82
x – Charlotte Rush	43	33	8	2	68	186	96
x – Richmond Generals	43	27	13	3	57	160	116
x – Carolina Eagles	44	22	20	2	46	105	113
Atlanta Kings	43	19	21	3	41	127	134
Potomac Patriots	44	8	31	5	21	76	165

== Premier Division playoffs ==
=== Divisional Round ===
Teams are reseeded after the quarterfinal rounds.

==== Florida ====
Semifinals (Best-of-3)
1	DME Swamp Rabbits	?
4	Florida Jr. Blades	?
2	Florida Eels	2
3	Tampa Bay Juniors	1

Note: * denotes overtime period(s)

==== Great Lakes ====
Semifinals (Best-of-3)
1	Metro Jets	2
4	Lansing Wolves	0
2	Pittsburgh Vengeance	2
3	Metro Jets Development Program	0

Note: * denotes overtime period(s)

==== Mid-Atlantic ====
Quarterfinals (Best-of-3)
3	New Jersey Hitmen	2
6	Jersey Shore Whalers	0
4	New Jersey Rockets	2
5	Philadelphia Hockey Club	0

Semifinals (Best-of-3)
1	New York Aviators	2
4	New Jersey Rockets	1
2	Skipjacks Hockey Club	1
3	New Jersey Hitmen	2

Note: * denotes overtime period(s)

==== Midwest East ====
Quarterfinals (Best-of-3)
3	Midwest Blackbirds	2
6	Tri-City Ice Hawks	0
4	Decatur Blaze	2
5	Detroit Fighting Irish	0

Semifinals (Best-of-3)
1	Chicago Cougars	2
4	Decatur Blaze	0
2	Motor City Hockey Club	2
3	Midwest Blackbirds	1

Note: * denotes overtime period(s)

==== Midwest West ====
Quarterfinals (Best-of-3)
1	Minnesota Moose	2
8	Kasson Vipers	0
2	Hudson Havoc	1
7	Dells Ducks	2
3	Wisconsin Rapids RiverKings	2
6	Minnesota Mullets	0
4	Minnesota Blue Ox	2
5	Rum River Mallards	1

Semifinals (Best-of-3)
1	Minnesota Moose	2
7	Dells Ducks	0
2	Wisconsin Rapids RiverKings	0
3	Minnesota Blue Ox	2

Note: * denotes overtime period(s)

==== New England ====
Quarterfinals (Best-of-3)
3	South Shore Kings	2
6	Twin City Thunder	0
4	New Hampshire Junior Monarchs	2
5	Islanders Hockey Club	1

Semifinals (Best-of-3)
1	Northern Cyclones	1
4	New Hampshire Junior Monarchs	2
2	Boston Bandits	2
3	South Shore Kings	0

Note: * denotes overtime period(s)

==== Northeast ====
Quarterfinals (Best-of-3)
3	Syracuse Stars	2
6	Rochester Monarchs	0
4	Connecticut Jr. Rangers	2
5	Niagara Falls Thunder	1

Semifinals (Best-of-3)
1	Connecticut Nighthawks	2
4	Connecticut Jr. Rangers	1
2	Springfield Pics	0
3	Syracuse Stars	2

Note: * denotes overtime period(s)

==== Southeast ====
Semifinal (Best-of-3)
1	Hampton Roads Whalers	2
4	Carolina Eagles	0
2	Charlotte Rush	2
3	Richmond Generals	0

Note: * denotes overtime period(s)

=== National Round ===
The 16 qualifying teams were sorted into four separate pools for Round Robin play. The top team from each pool would advance to the Championship round.

==== Round Robin ====
Pool W

		MET	FJB	CHC	CON
1	Metro Jets		2–2	5–1	7–1
2	Florida Jr. Blades	2–2		4–1	3–2
3	Chicago Cougars	1–5	1–4		2–1
4	Connecticut Nighthawks	1–7	2–3	1–2	

Rank	Team	W	L	T	Pts	GF	GA
1	Metro Jets	2	0	1	5	14	4
2	Florida Jr. Blades	2	0	1	5	11	5
3	Chicago Cougars	1	2	0	2	4	10
4	Connecticut Nighthawks	0	3	0	0	4	12

Pool X

		HAM	FLE	SYR	PIT
1	Hampton Roads Whalers		1–3	4–0	5–1
2	Florida Eels	3–1		4–4	2–4
3	Syracuse Stars	0–4	4–4		2–1
4	Pittsburgh Vengeance	1–5	4–2	1–2	

Rank	Team	W	L	T	Pts	GF	GA
1	Hampton Roads Whalers	2	1	0	4	10	4
2	Florida Eels	1	1	1	3	9	9
3	Syracuse Stars	1	1	1	3	6	9
4	Pittsburgh Vengeance	1	2	0	2	6	9

Pool Y

		MBO	CHA	NYA	NJM
1	Minnesota Blue Ox		3–3	6–3	2–1
2	Charlotte Rush	3–3		3–1	1–0
3	New York Aviators	3–6	1–3		2–0
4	New Hampshire Junior Monarchs	1–2	0–1	0–2	

Rank	Team	W	L	T	Pts	GF	GA
1	Minnesota Blue Ox	2	0	1	5	11	7
2	Charlotte Rush	2	0	1	5	7	4
3	New York Aviators	1	2	0	2	6	9
4	New Hampshire Junior Monarchs	0	3	0	0	1	5

Pool Z

		BOB	NJH	MNM	MCH
1	Boston Bandits		6–1	4–3	7–1
2	New Jersey Hitmen	1–6		2–1	8–0
3	Minnesota Moose	3–4	1–2		9–1
4	Motor City Hockey Club	1–7	0–8	1–9	

Rank	Team	W	L	T	Pts	GF	GA
1	Boston Bandits	3	0	0	6	17	5
2	New Jersey Hitmen	2	1	0	4	11	7
3	Minnesota Moose	1	2	0	2	13	7
4	Motor City Hockey Club	0	3	0	0	2	24

Games in italics indicate overtime or shootout results.

==== Championship round ====
Semifinals
W	Metro Jets	7
Y	Minnesota Blue Ox	1
X	Hampton Roads Whalers	5
Z	Boston Bandits	1

Championship
W	Metro Jets	2
X	Hampton Roads Whalers	5

Note: * denotes overtime period(s)
