= 2023–24 USPHL Premier season =

- League: United States Premier Hockey League; Premier
- Sport: Ice hockey
- Duration: Regular season September 8, 2023 – March 3, 2024; Postseason; February 28 – March 26, 2024
- Games: 46–20
- Teams: 61

Regular season
- Season champions: Connecticut Jr. Rangers
- Top scorer: Noak Persson (Fresno Monsters)

USPHL Premier Playoffs
- Finals champions: Connecticut Jr. Rangers
- Runners-up: Islanders Hockey Club

USPHL Premier seasons
- ← 2022–23 2024–25 →

The 2023–24 USPHL Premier season was the 11th season of the Premier Division of the United States Premier Hockey League (USPHL). The regular season ran from September 8, 2023 to March 3, 2024 with an unbalanced schedule. The Connecticut Jr. Rangers won the regular season championship and went on to defeat the Islanders Hockey Club 5–4 in overtime in the Championship game.

== Member changes ==
- In late January, the USPHL announced the addition of the Bold City Battalion to both the Premier and Elite Divisions.
- On December 5, 2023, the Richmond Generals withdrew from both the Premier and Elite Divisions for the remainder of the season. Both teams remained dormant after the year.
- The USPHL promoted its entire Mountain Division to the National Collegiate Development Conference. The departing teams were to be the Idaho Falls Spud Kings, Northern Colorado Eagles, Ogden Mustangs, Provo Predators, Pueblo Bulls and Utah Outliers. However, the after the Eagles franchise lost access to its home arena thanks to expansion from the NAHL, the USPHL then promoted the Rock Springs Grizzlies to the NCDC as well.
- In May, the USPHL approved the addition the Casper Roughnecks to the league.
- A week later, the Bridgewater Bandits announced that they would be withdrawing from the USPHL to rejoin the Eastern Hockey League.
- When the USPHL held its annual draft for the 2023–24 season, neither the New Hampshire Junior Monarchs nor the Boston Advantage participated. Their absence went without comment by the league and they were not included on the schedule when it was released later in the summer.
- In early June, the Elmira Jr. Enforcers rebranded as the Elmira Impact. Around the same time the New York Aviators rebranded as the Brooklyn Aviators.
- The Twin City Thunder's Premier franchise suspended play due in part to travel expenses. The team would return one year later after being sold and relocated.
- On August 23, the USPHL announced the league's first Canadian team with the addition of Universel Collège Gatineau. Due to long travel times between Gatineau and every other USPHL team, the team would play the entire season on the road.

== Regular season ==
The standings at the end of the regular season were as follows:

Note: x = clinched playoff berth; y = clinched division title; z = clinched regular season title

=== Standings ===
==== Atlantic Division ====
Team	GP	W	L	OTL	Pts	GF	GA
xyz – Connecticut Jr. Rangers	44	41	3	0	82	341	105
x – Wilkes-Barre/Scranton Knights	44	30	7	7	67	209	110
x – Hershey Cubs	44	26	15	3	55	189	166
x – P.A.L. Jr. Islanders	44	25	16	3	53	179	152
x – Elmira Impact	44	23	14	7	53	183	144
x – Rockets Hockey Club	44	22	17	5	49	162	158
x – Jersey Hitmen	44	12	28	4	28	148	222
x – Brooklyn Aviators	44	1	42	1	3	51	372

==== Florida Division ====
Team	GP	W	L	OTL	Pts	GF	GA
xy – Bold City Battalion	44	30	11	3	63	195	112
x – Florida Eels	44	28	14	2	58	209	116
x – Tampa Bay Juniors	44	28	16	0	56	154	142
x – Atlanta Madhatters	44	24	17	3	51	142	138
Florida Jr. Blades	44	11	29	4	26	99	184
Palm Beach Typhoon	44	8	32	4	20	113	264

==== Great Lakes Division ====
Team	GP	W	L	OTL	Pts	GF	GA
xy – Metro Jets	43	38	2	3	79	359	71
x – Nashville Spartans	44	36	7	1	73	318	83
x – Toledo Cherokee	44	31	11	2	64	248	106
x – Columbus Mavericks	43	8	32	3	19	89	306
x – Buffalo Stampede	44	6	38	0	12	105	328
x – Cincinnati Jr. Cyclones	44	3	40	1	7	77	370

==== Midwest East Division ====
Team	GP	W	L	OTL	Pts	GF	GA
xy – Metro Jets Development Program	44	31	7	6	68	180	90
x – Fort Wayne Spacemen	44	32	10	2	66	224	112
x – Chicago Crush	44	25	15	4	54	142	126
x – Chicago Cougars	44	23	17	4	50	154	143
x – Motor City Gamblers	44	19	20	5	43	157	180
x – Battle Creek Kernels	44	12	29	3	27	108	199
Decatur Blaze	44	7	35	2	16	90	290

==== Midwest West Division ====
Team	GP	W	L	OTL	Pts	GF	GA
xy – Wisconsin Rapids RiverKings	44	30	7	7	67	162	92
x – Minnesota Squatch	44	32	10	2	66	244	132
x – Hudson Havoc	44	30	12	2	62	150	108
x – Minnesota Blue Ox	44	25	18	1	51	169	144
x – Minnesota Moose	44	23	18	3	49	143	118
x – Steele County Blades	44	19	22	3	41	151	159
x – Isanti Outlaws	44	13	30	1	27	129	222
x – Minnesota Mullets	44	13	31	0	26	135	202
Dells Ducks	44	11	31	2	24	106	235

==== New England Division ====
Team	GP	W	L	OTL	Pts	GF	GA
xy – Utica Jr. Comets	44	36	6	2	74	220	105
x – Northern Cyclones	44	29	11	4	62	173	113
x – Islanders Hockey Club	44	22	15	7	51	144	141
x – Universel Collège Gatineau	44	22	20	2	46	145	134
x – Springfield Pics	44	21	21	2	44	149	156
x – South Shore Kings	44	17	23	4	38	122	149
x – Boston Junior Bruins	44	13	28	3	29	152	191

==== Northwest Division ====
Team	GP	W	L	OTL	Pts	GF	GA
xy – Vernal Oilers	44	29	9	6	64	222	138
x – Seattle Totems	44	28	14	2	58	190	131
x – Casper Roughnecks	44	19	22	3	41	171	197
x – Rogue Valley Royals	44	13	29	2	28	119	227
Bellingham Blazers	44	6	36	2	14	87	207

==== Pacific Division ====
Team	GP	W	L	OTL	Pts	GF	GA
xy – Fresno Monsters	46	39	5	2	80	345	130
x – Ontario Jr. Reign	46	37	8	1	75	241	110
x – Las Vegas Thunderbirds	46	31	14	1	63	222	151
x – Bakersfield Roughnecks	46	27	15	4	58	216	141
Lake Tahoe Lakers	46	18	24	4	40	147	195
San Diego Sabers	46	15	30	1	31	212	248
Long Beach Shredders	46	6	40	0	12	84	422

==== Southeast Division ====
Team	GP	W	L	OTL	Pts	GF	GA
xy – Potomac Patriots	42	36	3	3	75	255	112
x – Charlotte Rush	42	35	5	2	72	215	89
x – Carolina Jr. Hurricanes	42	28	12	2	58	170	114
x – Hampton Roads Whalers	42	17	20	5	39	134	148
Richmond Generals	20	6	14	0	12	66	88
Columbia Infantry	42	5	35	4	12	83	260

== Premier Division playoffs ==
Teams are reseeded after the quarterfinal rounds.

=== Divisional Round ===
February 28 – March 17

==== Atlantic ====
Quarterfinals (Best-of-3)
1	Connecticut Jr. Rangers	11	11	-
8	Brooklyn Aviators	0	0	-
2	Wilkes-Barre/Scranton Knights	7	6	-
7	Jersey Hitmen	1	3	-
3	Hershey Cubs	1	1	-
6	Rockets Hockey Club	4	6	-
4	P.A.L. Jr. Islanders	2	2	-
5	Elmira Impact	3	4	-

Semifinals (Best-of-3)
1	Connecticut Jr. Rangers	3	6	-
6	Rockets Hockey Club	1	0	-
2	Wilkes-Barre/Scranton Knights	3*	3*	-
5	Elmira Impact	2	2	-

Note: * denotes overtime period(s)

==== Florida ====
Semifinals (Best-of-3)
1	Bold City Battalion	5	1	5
4	Atlanta Madhatters	2	2	2
2	Florida Eels	5	3	5
3	Tampa Bay Juniors	1	4*	0

Note: * denotes overtime period(s)

==== Great Lakes ====
Quarterfinals (Best-of-3)
3	Toledo Cherokee	12	7	-
6	Cincinnati Jr. Cyclones	0	0	-
4	Columbus Mavericks	4	4	-
5	Buffalo Stampede	5	5*	-

Semifinals (Best-of-3)
1	Metro Jets	12	11	-
5	Buffalo Stampede	0	0	-
2	Nashville Spartans	5	8	-
3	Toledo Cherokee	2	2	-

Note: * denotes overtime period(s)

==== Midwest East ====
Quarterfinals (Best-of-3)
3	Chicago Crush	2	4	-
6	Battle Creek Kernels	1	2	-
4	Chicago Cougars	1	4	-
5	Motor City Gamblers	4	5*	-

Semifinals (Best-of-3)
1	Metro Jets Development Program	5	8	-
5	Motor City Gamblers	0	5	-
2	Fort Wayne Spacemen	3	4	5*
3	Battle Creek Kernels	4	1	4

Note: * denotes overtime period(s)

==== Midwest West ====
Quarterfinals (Best-of-3)
1	Wisconsin Rapids RiverKings	6	3	-
8	Minnesota Mullets	0	2	-
2	Minnesota Squatch	4	6	-
7	Isanti Outlaws	3	3	-
3	Hudson Havoc	4	2	4
6	Steele County Blades	3	4	2
4	Minnesota Blue Ox	4	3	-
5	Minnesota Moose	7	6	-

Semifinals (Best-of-3)
1	Wisconsin Rapids RiverKings	3	4	-
5	Minnesota Moose	2	0	-
2	Minnesota Squatch	6	3	7**
3	Hudson Havoc	3	4*	6

Note: * denotes overtime period(s)

==== New England ====
Quarterfinals (Best-of-3)
2	Northern Cyclones	1	1	-
7	Boston Junior Bruins	4	2**	-
3	Islanders Hockey Club	3	3**	-
6	South Shore Kings	1	2	-
4	Universel Collège Gatineau	1	4	4
5	Springfield Pics	2**	0	2

Semifinals (Best-of-3)
1	Utica Jr. Comets	5	5	-
7	Boston Junior Bruins	3	3	-
3	Islanders Hockey Club	5*	4	-
4	Universel Collège Gatineau	4	0	-

Note: * denotes overtime period(s)

==== Northwest ====
Semifinals (Best-of-3)
1	Vernal Oilers	9	5	-
4	Rogue Valley Royals	2	2	-
2	Seattle Totems	6	5	-
3	Casper Roughnecks	3	1	-

Final (Best-of-3)
1	Vernal Oilers	5	5	-
2	Seattle Totems	1	4	-

Note: * denotes overtime period(s)

==== Pacific ====
Semifinals (Best-of-3)
1	Fresno Monsters	5	8*	-
4	Bakersfield Roughnecks	0	7	-
2	Ontario Jr. Reign	3	2*	5
3	Las Vegas Thunderbirds	5	1	0

Final (Best-of-3)
1	Fresno Monsters	3	7	-
2	Ontario Jr. Reign	1	3	-

Note: * denotes overtime period(s)

==== Southeast ====
Semifinal (Best-of-1)
1	Potomac Patriots	7
4	Hampton Roads Whalers	1
2	Charlotte Rush	3
3	Carolina Jr. Hurricanes	0

Note: * denotes overtime period(s)

=== National Round ===
All games took place at the Nexus Center in Utica, New York.

==== Seeding games ====
March 21 – March 22
All of the qualifying teams played two games in the seeding round to determine single-elimination placement.

Winning Team	Score	Losing Team	Score
Metro Jets Development Program	1	Wilkes-Barre/Scranton Knights	0
Nashville Spartans	3	Bold City Battalion	2
Metro Jets	7	Islanders Hockey Club	1
Fort Wayne Spacemen	7	Vernal Oilers	2
Charlotte Rush	4	Connecticut Jr. Rangers	3
Florida Eels	6*	Potomac Patriots	5
Utica Jr. Comets	2	Minnesota Squatch	1
Wisconsin Rapids RiverKings	5	Ontario Jr. Reign	3
Florida Eels	5	Metro Jets Development Program	1
Connecticut Jr. Rangers	4*	Islanders Hockey Club	3
Potomac Patriots	10	Fort Wayne Spacemen	2
Metro Jets	6	Minnesota Squatch	2
Nashville Spartans	7	Wisconsin Rapids RiverKings	5
Wilkes-Barre/Scranton Knights	3	Bold City Battalion	0
Charlotte Rush	5	Utica Jr. Comets	1
Vernal Oilers	5*	Ontario Jr. Reign	4

Standings

Rank	Team	W	OTW	OTL	L	Pts	GF	GA	DIF
1	Metro Jets	2	0	0	0	6	13	3	+10
2	Charlotte Rush	2	0	0	0	6	9	4	+5
3	Nashville Spartans	2	0	0	0	6	10	7	+3
4	Florida Eels	1	1	0	0	5	11	6	+5
5	Potomac Patriots	1	0	1	0	4	15	8	+7
6	Wilkes-Barre/Scranton Knights	1	0	0	1	3	1	3	-2
7	Wisconsin Rapids RiverKings	1	0	0	1	3	10	10	+0
8	Utica Jr. Comets	1	0	0	1	3	3	6	-3
9	Metro Jets Development Program	1	0	0	1	3	2	5	-3
10	Fort Wayne Spacemen	1	0	0	1	3	9	12	-3
11	Connecticut Jr. Rangers	0	1	0	1	2	7	7	+0
12	Vernal Oilers	0	1	0	1	2	7	11	-4
13	Ontario Jr. Reign	0	0	1	1	1	7	10	-3
14	Islanders Hockey Club	0	0	1	1	1	4	11	-7
15	Bold City Battalion	0	0	0	2	0	2	6	-4
16	Minnesota Squatch	0	0	0	2	0	3	8	-5

==== Championship round ====
Eighthfinal (March 23)
1	Metro Jets	7
16	Minnesota Squatch	3
2	Charlotte Rush	4
15	Bold City Battalion	0
3	Nashville Spartans	5
14	Islanders Hockey Club	8
4	Florida Eels	5
13	Ontario Jr. Reign	3
5	Potomac Patriots	6
12	Vernal Oilers	4
6	Wilkes-Barre/Scranton Knights	2
11	Connecticut Jr. Rangers	6
7	Wisconsin Rapids RiverKings	0
10	Fort Wayne Spacemen	4
8	Utica Jr. Comets	2
9	Metro Jets Development Program	4

Quarterfinals (March 24)
1	Metro Jets	3
14	Islanders Hockey Club	4
2	Charlotte Rush	0
11	Connecticut Jr. Rangers	2
4	Florida Eels	4
10	Fort Wayne Spacemen	3
5	Potomac Patriots	3
9	Metro Jets Development Program	4**

Semifinals (March 25)
4	Florida Eels	1
14	Islanders Hockey Club	3
9	Metro Jets Development Program	2
11	Connecticut Jr. Rangers	5

Championship (March 26)
14	Islanders Hockey Club	4
11	Connecticut Jr. Rangers	5*

Note: * denotes overtime period(s)
