= 2021–22 USPHL Premier season =

- League: United States Premier Hockey League; Premier
- Sport: Ice hockey
- Duration: Regular season September 11, 2021 – March 3, 2022; Postseason; March 2022
- Games: 50–43
- Teams: 64

Regular season
- Season champions: Utah Outliers
- Top scorer: Stepan Skvirsky (Fresno Monsters)

USPHL Premier Playoffs
- Finals champions: Rockets Hockey Club
- Runners-up: Metro Jets

USPHL Premier seasons
- ← 2020–21 2022–23 →

The 2021–22 USPHL Premier season was the 9th season of the Premier Division of the United States Premier Hockey League (USPHL). The regular season ran from September 11, 2021 to March 3, 2022 with an unbalanced schedule. The Utah Outliers won the regular season championship. The Rockets Hockey Club defeated the Metro Jets 3–2 in the Championship game.

== Member changes ==
- On February 24, 2021, the Wilkes-Barre/Scranton Knights announced that they were restarting their junior program after a two-year pause. The Organization would operate clubs in the Premier and Elite Divisions this season followed by the addition of an NCDC team in 2022–23.
- On the same day, the Hershey Cubs were also announced as an expansion franchise. The team was founded by Bruce Boudreau who was also the owner of the Minnesota Blue Ox at the time.
- In early March, the USPHL approved the addition of the Palm Beach Typhoon to the Premier and Elite Divisions as expansion franchises. Both teams began this season.
- After finishing their season, the Buffalo Thunder announced that they were withdrawing from the league and disbanding. Shortly afterwards, the Buffalo Stampede were approved as a new franchise to fill the void.The new club had the same ownership group as the Columbus Mavericks.
- At the end of the month, the Cincinnati Jr. Cyclones were announced as an additional expansion team.
- On April 21, the Lake Tahoe Lakers were announced as a new expansion team for this season.
- On May 8, the Anaheim Avalanche were purchased by Emerson Etem. The new owner relocated the team and renamed them as the Long Beach Shredders.
- In Late May, the Ontario Jr. Reign were added as expansion franchise for the Premier Division.
- During the summer, the Charleston Colonials were removed from the league. They would later rejoin the league in 2025.
- Additionally, the Rochester Vipers and the Skipjacks Hockey Club also withdrew from the league. The latter would continue to operate an U18 squad until 2024.
- The Jersey Shore Whalers returned from a 1-year hiatus as the Jersey Whalers.

== Regular season ==
The standings at the end of the regular season were as follows:

Note: x = clinched playoff berth; y = clinched division title; z = clinched regular season title

=== Standings ===
==== Atlantic East Division ====
| Team | GP | W | L | OTL | Pts | GF | GA |
|---|---|---|---|---|---|---|---|
| xy – Rockets Hockey Club | 44 | 31 | 7 | 6 | 68 | 222 | 113 |
| x – New York Aviators | 44 | 31 | 11 | 2 | 64 | 249 | 121 |
| x – Philadelphia Hockey Club | 44 | 25 | 17 | 2 | 52 | 160 | 140 |
| x – Jersey Whalers | 44 | 24 | 17 | 3 | 51 | 136 | 128 |
| Jersey Hitmen | 44 | 17 | 24 | 3 | 37 | 121 | 192 |
| P.A.L. Jr. Islanders | 44 | 16 | 24 | 4 | 36 | 141 | 195 |
| Connecticut Jr. Rangers | 44 | 11 | 32 | 1 | 23 | 107 | 191 |

==== Atlantic West Division ====
| Team | GP | W | L | OTL | Pts | GF | GA |
|---|---|---|---|---|---|---|---|
| xy – Wilkes-Barre/Scranton Knights | 44 | 39 | 3 | 2 | 80 | 228 | 89 |
| x – Utica Jr. Comets | 44 | 26 | 15 | 3 | 55 | 174 | 142 |
| x – Hershey Cubs | 44 | 11 | 30 | 3 | 25 | 104 | 193 |
| x – Buffalo Stampede | 44 | 8 | 32 | 4 | 20 | 145 | 272 |
| Elmira Jr. Enforcers | 44 | 8 | 33 | 3 | 19 | 113 | 229 |

==== Florida Division ====
| Team | GP | W | L | OTL | Pts | GF | GA |
|---|---|---|---|---|---|---|---|
| xy – Florida Eels | 44 | 33 | 8 | 3 | 69 | 198 | 112 |
| x – Tampa Bay Juniors | 44 | 31 | 10 | 3 | 65 | 186 | 128 |
| x – Florida Jr. Blades | 44 | 18 | 20 | 6 | 42 | 187 | 170 |
| x – Atlanta Madhatters | 44 | 18 | 25 | 1 | 37 | 143 | 188 |
| Palm Beach Typhoon | 44 | 8 | 33 | 3 | 19 | 126 | 250 |

==== Great Lakes Division ====
| Team | GP | W | L | OTL | Pts | GF | GA |
|---|---|---|---|---|---|---|---|
| xy – Metro Jets | 44 | 39 | 4 | 1 | 79 | 327 | 67 |
| x – Toledo Cherokee | 44 | 35 | 6 | 3 | 73 | 253 | 76 |
| x – Columbus Mavericks | 44 | 30 | 11 | 3 | 63 | 190 | 108 |
| x – Pittsburgh Vengeance | 44 | 21 | 20 | 3 | 45 | 168 | 175 |
| x – Cincinnati Jr. Cyclones | 44 | 19 | 23 | 2 | 40 | 165 | 193 |
| x – Lake Erie Bighorns | 44 | 10 | 30 | 4 | 24 | 115 | 260 |
| Wooster Oilers | 44 | 4 | 39 | 1 | 9 | 68 | 346 |

==== Midwest East Division ====
| Team | GP | W | L | OTL | Pts | GF | GA |
|---|---|---|---|---|---|---|---|
| xy – Chicago Cougars | 44 | 30 | 11 | 3 | 63 | 202 | 98 |
| x – Fort Wayne Spacemen | 44 | 28 | 13 | 3 | 59 | 206 | 124 |
| x – Metro Jets Development Program | 44 | 28 | 16 | 0 | 56 | 180 | 118 |
| x – Detroit Fighting Irish | 44 | 22 | 19 | 3 | 47 | 196 | 190 |
| x – Midwest Blackbirds | 44 | 15 | 25 | 4 | 34 | 120 | 201 |
| x – Decatur Blaze | 44 | 13 | 30 | 1 | 27 | 131 | 234 |
| x – Motor City Hockey Club | 43 | 3 | 36 | 4 | 10 | 79 | 299 |

==== Midwest West Division ====
| Team | GP | W | L | OTL | Pts | GF | GA |
|---|---|---|---|---|---|---|---|
| xy – Minnesota Blue Ox | 44 | 37 | 6 | 1 | 75 | 246 | 108 |
| x – Wisconsin Rapids RiverKings | 44 | 32 | 7 | 5 | 69 | 163 | 91 |
| x – Hudson Havoc | 44 | 28 | 10 | 6 | 62 | 172 | 88 |
| x – Minnesota Moose | 44 | 23 | 17 | 4 | 50 | 183 | 133 |
| x – Steele County Blades | 44 | 22 | 18 | 4 | 48 | 168 | 174 |
| x – Minnesota Mullets | 44 | 18 | 24 | 2 | 38 | 131 | 164 |
| x – Rum River Mallards | 44 | 11 | 31 | 2 | 24 | 143 | 245 |
| x – Dells Ducks | 44 | 4 | 39 | 1 | 9 | 94 | 333 |

==== Mountain Division ====
| Team | GP | W | L | OTL | Pts | GF | GA |
|---|---|---|---|---|---|---|---|
| xyz – Utah Outliers | 50 | 38 | 7 | 5 | 81 | 199 | 113 |
| x – Ogden Mustangs | 50 | 31 | 13 | 6 | 68 | 211 | 128 |
| x – Pueblo Bulls | 50 | 29 | 20 | 1 | 59 | 171 | 137 |
| x – Northern Colorado Eagles | 49 | 20 | 26 | 3 | 43 | 154 | 168 |
| x – Provo Predators | 50 | 7 | 41 | 2 | 16 | 82 | 279 |

==== New England Division ====
| Team | GP | W | L | OTL | Pts | GF | GA |
|---|---|---|---|---|---|---|---|
| x – Northern Cyclones | 44 | 37 | 3 | 4 | 78 | 197 | 90 |
| x – South Shore Kings | 44 | 28 | 12 | 4 | 60 | 154 | 108 |
| x – Bridgewater Bandits | 44 | 27 | 15 | 2 | 56 | 149 | 117 |
| x – Boston Junior Bruins | 44 | 23 | 14 | 6 | 52 | 132 | 103 |
| x – Springfield Pics | 44 | 25 | 17 | 2 | 52 | 135 | 125 |
| x – Islanders Hockey Club | 44 | 21 | 19 | 4 | 46 | 116 | 119 |
| x – New Hampshire Junior Monarchs | 44 | 20 | 22 | 2 | 42 | 164 | 151 |
| x – Twin City Thunder | 44 | 19 | 21 | 4 | 42 | 119 | 143 |
| Boston Advantage | 44 | 17 | 22 | 5 | 39 | 140 | 180 |

==== Pacific Division ====
| Team | GP | W | L | OTL | Pts | GF | GA |
|---|---|---|---|---|---|---|---|
| xy – Fresno Monsters | 44 | 30 | 11 | 3 | 63 | 307 | 163 |
| x – Las Vegas Thunderbirds | 44 | 29 | 14 | 1 | 59 | 213 | 192 |
| x – Lake Tahoe Lakers | 44 | 22 | 21 | 1 | 45 | 198 | 183 |
| x – Ontario Jr. Reign | 44 | 19 | 23 | 2 | 40 | 183 | 234 |
| San Diego Sabers | 44 | 17 | 23 | 4 | 38 | 154 | 187 |
| Long Beach Shredders | 44 | 11 | 29 | 4 | 26 | 149 | 276 |

==== Southeast Division ====
| Team | GP | W | L | OTL | Pts | GF | GA |
|---|---|---|---|---|---|---|---|
| xy – Charlotte Rush | 44 | 31 | 10 | 3 | 65 | 169 | 109 |
| x – Richmond Generals | 44 | 29 | 13 | 2 | 60 | 159 | 111 |
| x – Hampton Roads Whalers | 44 | 27 | 12 | 5 | 59 | 150 | 113 |
| x – Carolina Jr. Hurricanes | 44 | 21 | 17 | 6 | 48 | 138 | 119 |
| Potomac Patriots | 44 | 16 | 23 | 5 | 37 | 125 | 182 |

== Premier Division playoffs ==
Teams are reseeded after the quarterfinal rounds.

=== Divisional Round ===
==== Atlantic East ====
Semifinals (Best-of-3)
1 | Rockets Hockey Club | 2
4 | Jersey Whalers | 0
2 | New York Aviators | 2
3 | Philadelphia Hockey Club | 0

Final (Best-of-3)
1 | Rockets Hockey Club | 0
2 | New York Aviators | 2

Note: * denotes overtime period(s)

==== Atlantic West ====
Semifinals (Best-of-3)
1 | Wilkes-Barre/Scranton Knights | 2
4 | Buffalo Stampede | 0
2 | Utica Jr. Comets | 2
3 | Hershey Cubs | 1

Final (Best-of-3)
1 | Wilkes-Barre/Scranton Knights | 2
2 | Utica Jr. Comets | 0

Note: * denotes overtime period(s)

==== Florida ====
Semifinals (Best-of-3)
1 | Florida Eels | 2
4 | Atlanta Madhatters | 0
2 | Tampa Bay Juniors | 1
3 | Florida Jr. Blades | 2

Note: * denotes overtime period(s)

==== Great Lakes ====
Quarterfinals (Best-of-3)
3 | Columbus Mavericks | 2
6 | Lake Erie Bighorns | 0
4 | Pittsburgh Vengeance | 2
5 | Cincinnati Jr. Cyclones | 0

Semifinals (Best-of-3)
1 | Metro Jets | 2
4 | Pittsburgh Vengeance | 0
2 | Toledo Cherokee | 2
3 | Columbus Mavericks | 0

Note: * denotes overtime period(s)

==== Midwest East ====
Quarterfinals (Best-of-3)
2 | Fort Wayne Spacemen | 2
7 | Motor City Hockey Club | 0
3 | Metro Jets Development Program | 2
6 | Decatur Blaze | 1
4 | Detroit Fighting Irish | 2
5 | Midwest Blackbirds | 0

Semifinals (Best-of-3)
1 | Chicago Cougars | 2
4 | Detroit Fighting Irish | 1
2 | Fort Wayne Spacemen | 1
3 | Metro Jets Development Program | 2

Note: * denotes overtime period(s)

==== Midwest West ====
Quarterfinals (Best-of-3)
1 | Minnesota Blue Ox | 2
8 | Dells Ducks | 0
2 | Wisconsin Rapids RiverKings | 2
7 | Rum River Mallards | 0
3 | Hudson Havoc | 2
6 | Minnesota Mullets | 1
4 | Minnesota Moose | 2
5 | Steele County Blades | 0

Semifinals (Best-of-3)
1 | Minnesota Blue Ox | 2
4 | Minnesota Moose | 0
2 | Wisconsin Rapids RiverKings | 2
3 | Hudson Havoc | 1

Note: * denotes overtime period(s)

==== Mountain ====
| Quarterfinals (Best-of-3) | | | Semifinals (Best-of-3) | | | Finals (Best-of-3) |
| | | | 1 | Utah Outliers | 2 |
| 4 | Pueblo Bulls | 2 | 5 | Pueblo Bulls | 0 |
| 5 | Provo Riverblades | 0 | | | | 1 | Utah Outliers | 2 |
| | | | | | | 5 | Northern Colorado Eagles | 0 |
| | | | 2 | Ogden Mustangs | 1 |
| | | | 3 | Northern Colorado Eagles | 2 |

Note: * denotes overtime period(s)

==== New England ====
Quarterfinals (Best-of-3)
1 | Northern Cyclones | 2
8 | Twin City Thunder | 1
2 | South Shore Kings | 0
7 | New Hampshire Junior Monarchs | 2
3 | Bridgewater Bandits | 1
6 | Islanders Hockey Club | 2
4 | Boston Junior Bruins | 2
5 | Springfield Pics | 1

Semifinals (Best-of-3)
1 | Northern Cyclones | 2
7 | New Hampshire Junior Monarchs | 0
4 | Boston Junior Bruins | 0
6 | Islanders Hockey Club | 2

Note: * denotes overtime period(s)

==== Pacific ====
Semifinals (Best-of-3)
1 | Fresno Monsters | 2
4 | Ontario Jr. Reign | 0
2 | Las Vegas Thunderbirds | 2
3 | Lake Tahoe Lakers | 0

Final (Best-of-3)
1 | Fresno Monsters | 2
2 | Las Vegas Thunderbirds | 0

Note: * denotes overtime period(s)

==== Southeast ====
Semifinal (Best-of-3)
1 | Charlotte Rush | 2
4 | Carolina Jr. Hurricanes | 1
2 | Richmond Generals | 2
3 | Hampton Roads Whalers | 1

Note: * denotes overtime period(s)

=== National Round ===
The 16 qualifying teams were sorted into four separate pools for Round Robin play. The top two teams from each pool would advance to the Championship round.

==== Round Robin ====
Pool A

| | | MET | FJB | IHC | WBS |
| 1 | Metro Jets | | 2–0 | 7–4 | 1–4 |
| 2 | Florida Jr. Blades | 0–2 | | 8–4 | 0–3 |
| 3 | Islanders Hockey Club | 4–7 | 4–8 | | 2–3 |
| 4 | Wilkes-Barre/Scranton Knights | 4–1 | 3–0 | 3–2 | |

| Rank | Team | W | OTW | OTL | L | Pts | GF | GA |
|---|---|---|---|---|---|---|---|---|
| 1 | Wilkes-Barre/Scranton Knights | 3 | 0 | 0 | 0 | 9 | 9 | 3 |
| 2 | Metro Jets | 2 | 0 | 0 | 1 | 6 | 10 | 7 |
| 3 | Florida Jr. Blades | 1 | 0 | 0 | 2 | 3 | 8 | 9 |
| 4 | Islanders Hockey Club | 0 | 0 | 0 | 3 | 0 | 10 | 18 |

Pool B

| | | FLE | CHC | HUD | RHC |
| 1 | Florida Eels | | 4–2 | 6–0 | 1–2 |
| 2 | Chicago Cougars | 2–4 | | 3–4 | 2–6 |
| 3 | Hudson Havoc | 0–6 | 4–3 | | 1–7 |
| 4 | Rockets Hockey Club | 2–1 | 6–2 | 7–1 | |

| Rank | Team | W | OTW | OTL | L | Pts | GF | GA |
|---|---|---|---|---|---|---|---|---|
| 1 | Rockets Hockey Club | 3 | 0 | 0 | 0 | 9 | 15 | 4 |
| 2 | Florida Eels | 2 | 0 | 0 | 1 | 6 | 11 | 4 |
| 3 | Hudson Havoc | 1 | 0 | 0 | 2 | 3 | 5 | 16 |
| 4 | Chicago Cougars | 0 | 0 | 0 | 3 | 0 | 7 | 14 |

Pool C

| | | NOR | CHA | MDP | UTA |
| 1 | Northern Cyclones | | 1–5 | 4–0 | 5–1 |
| 2 | Charlotte Rush | 5–1 | | 4–2 | 2–3 |
| 3 | Metro Jets Development Program | 0–4 | 2–4 | | 1–4 |
| 4 | Utah Outliers | 1–5 | 3–2 | 4–1 | |

| Rank | Team | W | OTW | OTL | L | Pts | GF | GA |
|---|---|---|---|---|---|---|---|---|
| 1 | Charlotte Rush | 2 | 0 | 1 | 0 | 7 | 11 | 6 |
| 2 | Northern Cyclones | 2 | 0 | 0 | 1 | 6 | 6 | 6 |
| 3 | Utah Outliers | 1 | 1 | 0 | 1 | 5 | 8 | 8 |
| 4 | Metro Jets Development Program | 0 | 0 | 0 | 3 | 0 | 3 | 12 |

Pool D

| | | RIC | MBO | TOL | FRE |
| 1 | Richmond Generals | | 1–4 | 1–2 | 5–4 |
| 2 | Minnesota Blue Ox | 4–1 | | 1–2 | 4–2 |
| 3 | Toledo Cherokee | 2–1 | 2–1 | | 5–4 |
| 4 | Fresno Monsters | 4–5 | 2–4 | 4–5 | |

| Rank | Team | W | OTW | OTL | L | Pts | GF | GA |
|---|---|---|---|---|---|---|---|---|
| 1 | Toledo Cherokee | 2 | 1 | 0 | 0 | 8 | 9 | 6 |
| 2 | Minnesota Blue Ox | 2 | 0 | 0 | 1 | 6 | 9 | 4 |
| 3 | Richmond Generals | 0 | 1 | 0 | 2 | 2 | 7 | 10 |
| 4 | Fresno Monsters | 0 | 0 | 2 | 1 | 2 | 10 | 14 |

Games in italics indicate overtime or shootout results.

==== Championship round ====
Quarterfinals
1 | Wilkes-Barre/Scranton Knights | 2*
8 | Minnesota Blue Ox | 1
2 | Rockets Hockey Club | 5
7 | Northern Cyclones | 3
3 | Toledo Cherokee | 1
6 | Metro Jets | 3
4 | Charlotte Rush | 1
5 | Florida Eels | 2*

Semifinals
1 | Wilkes-Barre/Scranton Knights | 1
6 | Metro Jets | 8
2 | Rockets Hockey Club | 3
5 | Florida Eels | 2

Championship
6 | Metro Jets | 2
2 | Rockets Hockey Club | 3

Note: * denotes overtime period(s)
