= 2019–20 USPHL Premier season =

- League: United States Premier Hockey League; Premier
- Sport: Ice hockey
- Duration: Regular season September __, 2019 – March __, 2020; Postseason; March 2020
- Games: 44–14
- Teams: 52

Regular season
- Season champions: Rockets Hockey Club
- Top scorer: Jared Fisher (Fort Wayne Spacemen)

USPHL Premier Playoffs

USPHL Premier seasons
- ← 2018–19 2020–21 →

The 2019–20 USPHL Premier season was the 7th season of the Premier Division of the United States Premier Hockey League (USPHL). The regular season ran from September 18, 2020 to March 6, 2021 with an unbalanced schedule. The Rockets Hockey Club won the regular season championship. On March 12, 2020, after the Divisional postseason round had been completed, the USPHL cancelled the remainder of the playoffs due to the COVID-19 pandemic.

== Member changes ==
- In January 2019, the USPHL approved the addition of the Charleston Colonials as an expansion franchise.
- In the same month, the Carolina Eagles announced a merger with the Carolina Jr. Hurricanes organization. The Eagles would rebrand under Hurricanes banner for this season.
- On March 15, the Syracuse Stars announced a merger with the Utica Jr. Comets organization. The team relocated and assumed the name of their new parent club.
- In April, the Atlanta Madhatters were added to both the Premier and Elite Divisions of the USPHL.
- On May 16, the USPHL announced the addition of the Columbus Mavericks as an expansion franchise.
- A few days later, the Fort Wayne Spacemen were also approved an expansion franchise.
- In the offseason, both the Lake Erie Bighorns and P.A.L. Jr. Islanders returned from their one-year hiatus.
- The New Jersey Rockets rebranded as the Rockets Hockey Club.
- Over the summer, the Niagara Falls Thunder relocated and became the Buffalo Thunder and the Kasson Vipers relocated and became the Rochester Vipers.
- Due to uncertainty about their home arena, the Wooster Oilers suspended play prior to the season.
- When the USPHL began the season, the Atlanta Kings, DME Swamp Rabbits, Hartford Jr. Wolfpack and Tri-City Ice Hawks had all been removed from the league.
- On October 20, 2019, after forfeiting two games to the Springfield Pics, the Jersey Shore Whalers were removed from the league and promptly folded.

== Regular season ==
The standings at the end of the regular season were as follows:

Note: x = clinched playoff berth; y = clinched division title; z = clinched regular season title

=== Standings ===
==== Florida Division ====
Team	GP	W	L	OTL	Pts	GF	GA
xy – Florida Eels	44	32	9	3	67	190	125
x – Tampa Bay Juniors	44	21	20	3	45	173	151
x – Charleston Colonials	44	21	21	2	44	117	149
x – Florida Jr. Blades	44	16	23	5	37	132	162
Atlanta Madhatters	44	11	29	4	26	110	191

==== Great Lakes Division ====
Team	GP	W	L	OTL	Pts	GF	GA
xy – Metro Jets	44	36	7	1	73	271	87
x – Pittsburgh Vengeance	43	33	7	3	69	199	84
x – Toledo Cherokee	44	31	12	1	63	210	141
x – Lake Erie Bighorns	44	20	22	2	42	114	146
x – Lansing Wolves	44	14	27	3	31	123	198
x – Columbus Mavericks	44	7	35	2	16	124	259

==== Mid-Atlantic Division ====
Team	GP	W	L	OTL	Pts	GF	GA
xyz – Rockets Hockey Club	44	38	6	0	76	249	79
x – New York Aviators	44	34	8	2	70	263	121
x – Philadelphia Hockey Club	44	27	14	3	57	190	132
x – Skipjacks Hockey Club	44	26	16	1	53	158	130
x – New Jersey Hitmen	44	12	29	3	27	116	169
x – P.A.L. Jr. Islanders	44	10	32	2	22	87	202
Jersey Shore Whalers	14	1	12	1	3	12	61

==== Midwest East Division ====
Team	GP	W	L	OTL	Pts	GF	GA
xy – Chicago Cougars	44	35	8	1	71	299	104
x – Decatur Blaze	44	23	18	3	49	189	161
x – Metro Jets Development Program	44	22	20	2	46	130	123
x – Fort Wayne Spacemen	44	21	19	4	46	203	179
x – Detroit Fighting Irish	44	12	30	2	26	130	292
x – Midwest Blackbirds	44	12	32	0	24	110	279
x – Motor City Hockey Club	44	4	39	1	9	78	311

==== Midwest West Division ====
Team	GP	W	L	OTL	Pts	GF	GA
xy – Hudson Havoc	44	33	8	3	69	219	96
x – Wisconsin Rapids RiverKings	44	31	11	2	64	205	89
x – Minnesota Moose	44	29	12	3	61	202	122
x – Minnesota Blue Ox	44	26	14	4	56	210	152
x – Rum River Mallards	44	26	17	1	53	207	154
x – Minnesota Mullets	44	22	17	5	49	175	149
x – Steele County Blades	44	11	31	2	24	99	240
x – Dells Ducks	43	9	32	3	21	108	221
Rochester Vipers	44	6	38	0	12	88	284

==== New England Division ====
Team	GP	W	L	OTL	Pts	GF	GA
xy – Islanders Hockey Club	44	36	5	3	75	209	89
x – Northern Cyclones	44	28	11	5	61	162	105
x – New Hampshire Junior Monarchs	44	28	12	4	60	150	128
x – Boston Bandits	44	24	15	5	53	151	115
x – Twin City Thunder	44	22	21	1	45	157	176
x – Boston Junior Bruins	44	21	20	3	45	144	137
South Shore Kings	44	14	24	6	34	127	167

==== Northeast Division ====
Team	GP	W	L	OTL	Pts	GF	GA
xy – Utica Jr. Comets	44	30	11	3	63	194	122
x – Springfield Pics	44	29	14	1	59	167	108
x – Connecticut Jr. Rangers	44	21	21	2	44	175	168
x – Buffalo Thunder	43	16	25	2	34	134	193
x – Rochester Monarchs	44	6	34	4	16	93	267
x – Connecticut Nighthawks	43	5	38	0	10	74	322

==== Southeast Division ====
Team	GP	W	L	OTL	Pts	GF	GA
xy – Charlotte Rush	44	34	9	1	69	190	86
x – Hampton Roads Whalers	44	31	11	2	64	179	89
x – Richmond Generals	44	26	17	1	53	167	138
x – Carolina Jr. Hurricanes	44	24	17	3	51	160	131
Potomac Patriots	44	20	22	2	42	120	159

== Premier Division playoffs ==
=== Divisional Round ===
Teams are reseeded after the quarterfinal rounds.

==== Florida ====
Semifinals (Best-of-3)
1	Florida Eels	2
4	Florida Jr. Blades	1
2	Tampa Bay Juniors	2
3	Charleston Colonials	0

Note: * denotes overtime period(s)

==== Great Lakes ====
Quarterfinals (Best-of-3)
3	Toledo Cherokee	2
6	Columbus Mavericks	0
4	Lake Erie Bighorns	2
5	Lansing Wolves	1

Semifinals (Best-of-3)
1	Metro Jets	2
4	Lake Erie Bighorns	0
2	Pittsburgh Vengeance	2
3	Toledo Cherokee	0

Note: * denotes overtime period(s)

==== Mid-Atlantic ====
Quarterfinals (Best-of-3)
3	Philadelphia Hockey Club	2
6	P.A.L. Jr. Islanders	1
4	Skipjacks Hockey Club	2
5	Jersey Hitmen	1

Semifinals (Best-of-3)
1	New Jersey Rockets	2
4	Skipjacks Hockey Club	0
2	New York Aviators	2
3	Philadelphia Hockey Club	0

Note: * denotes overtime period(s)

==== Midwest East ====
Quarterfinals (Best-of-3)
2	Decatur Blaze	2
7	Motor City Hockey Club	0
3	Metro Jets Development Program	2
6	Midwest Blackbirds	0
4	Fort Wayne Spacemen	2
5	Detroit Fighting Irish	0

Semifinals (Best-of-3)
1	Chicago Cougars	2
4	Fort Wayne Spacemen	1
2	Decatur Blaze	2
3	Metro Jets Development Program	0

Note: * denotes overtime period(s)

==== Midwest West ====
Quarterfinals (Best-of-3)
1	Hudson Havoc	2
8	Dells Ducks	0
2	Wisconsin Rapids RiverKings	2
7	Steele County Blades	0
3	Minnesota Moose	2
6	Minnesota Mullets	0
4	Minnesota Blue Ox	2
5	Rum River Mallards	1

Semifinals (Best-of-3)
1	Hudson Havoc	2
4	Minnesota Blue Ox	0
2	Wisconsin Rapids RiverKings	1
3	Minnesota Moose	2

Note: * denotes overtime period(s)

==== New England ====
Quarterfinals (Best-of-3)
3	New Hampshire Junior Monarchs	1
6	Boston Junior Bruins	2
4	Boston Bandits	2
5	Twin City Thunder	0

Semifinals (Best-of-3)
1	Islanders Hockey Club	2
6	Boston Junior Bruins	1
2	Northern Cyclones	0
4	Boston Bandits	2

Note: * denotes overtime period(s)

==== Northeast ====
Quarterfinals (Best-of-3)
3	Connecticut Jr. Rangers	2
6	Connecticut Nighthawks	0
4	Buffalo Thunder	2
5	Rochester Monarchs	0

Semifinals (Best-of-3)
1	Utica Jr. Comets	2
4	Buffalo Thunder	0
2	Springfield Pics	2
3	Connecticut Jr. Rangers	0

Note: * denotes overtime period(s)

==== Southeast ====
Semifinal (Best-of-3)
1	Charlotte Rush	2
4	Carolina Jr. Hurricanes	0
2	Hampton Roads Whalers	2
3	Richmond Generals	0

Note: * denotes overtime period(s)

Remainder of postseason cancelled
