= 2022–23 USPHL Premier season =

- League: United States Premier Hockey League; Premier
- Sport: Ice hockey
- Duration: Regular season September 9, 2022 – March 5, 2023; Postseason; March 2023
- Games: 52–7
- Teams: 70

Regular season
- Season champions: Utah Outliers
- Top scorer: Alex Rene Bartakovics (Vernal Oilers)

USPHL Premier Playoffs
- Finals champions: Northern Cyclones
- Runners-up: Charlotte Rush

USPHL Premier seasons
- ← 2021–22 2023–24 →

The 2022–23 USPHL Premier season was the 10th season of the Premier Division of the United States Premier Hockey League (USPHL). The regular season ran from September 9, 2022 to March 5, 2023 with an unbalanced schedule. The Utah Outliers won the regular season championship. The Northern Cyclones defeated the Charlotte Rush 3–1 in the Championship game.

== Member changes ==
- On October 13, 2021, the USPHL approved the addition of the Bakersfield Roughnecks to the Premier Division as an expansion franchise. Initial plans were for the team to be ready for the 2021-22 season, however, their founding was postponed due to the COVID-19 pandemic. They would instead begin play this season.
- On March 11, the Columbia Infantry were announced as an expansion franchise for this season.
- At the end of the month, the USPHL announced that they were removing the Philadelphia Hockey Club from all levels of the league. The team would later join the Eastern Hockey League.
- On the same day, the USPHL replaced Philadelphia with an expansion team. The new club was the Idaho Falls Spud Kings and they would join with the other teams in the Mountain Division who were planning on a promotion to Tier II after this season.
- One week later, on April 6, the USPHL added another team to the Premier Division in the form of the Battle Creek Kernals.
- Two days later, the Nashville Spartans were also approved as an expansion franchise.
- On May 5, 2022, the USPHL announced the addition of a further expansion team, the Minnesota Squatch.
- On the same day, the USPHL added four teams (Bellingham Blazers, Rogue Valley Royals, Seattle Totems and Vernal Oilers) from the Western States Hockey League after that league's efforts at restarting post-COVID had failed. Additionally, the Rock Springs Prospectors were added as an expansion team to the newly-created Northwest Division.
- During the summer, the USPHL removed the Jersey Whalers and Pittsburgh Vengeance from the league and both suspended operations. After the Lake Erie Bighorns failed to relocate to Jamestown, New York, that franchise also went dormant.
- The Rum River Mallards relocated and became the Isanti Outlaws while the Detriut Fighting Irish relocated and became the Chicago Crush.
- The Motor City Hockey Club rebranded as the Motor City Gamblers while the Provo Riverblades rebranded as the Provo Predators.
- Just prior to the season, the Midwest Blackbirds were removed from the league.
- On October 8, 2022, the Wooster Oilers were unable to participate in a scheduled game and forfeited. Five days later, the league expelled the Oilers who promptly dissolved.

== Regular season ==
The standings at the end of the regular season were as follows:

Note: x = clinched playoff berth; y = clinched division title; z = clinched regular season title

=== Standings ===
==== Florida Division ====
Team	GP	W	L	OTL	Pts	GF	GA
xy – Florida Eels	44	36	6	2	74	254	102
x – Atlanta Madhatters	44	24	16	4	52	178	147
x – Tampa Bay Juniors	44	25	18	1	51	151	146
x – Palm Beach Typhoon	44	23	20	1	47	181	180
Florida Jr. Blades	44	19	22	3	41	139	161
Columbia Infantry	44	11	28	5	27	155	260

==== Great Lakes Division ====
Team	GP	W	L	OTL	Pts	GF	GA
xy – Toledo Cherokee	44	38	6	0	76	250	91
x – Metro Jets	44	35	8	1	71	252	72
x – Columbus Mavericks	44	19	19	6	44	134	143
x – Cincinnati Jr. Cyclones	44	6	36	2	14	72	275
Wooster Oilers	7	0	7	0	0	2	52

==== Mid-Atlantic Division ====
Team	GP	W	L	OTL	Pts	GF	GA
xy – New York Aviators	44	38	5	1	77	267	120
x – Wilkes-Barre/Scranton Knights	44	35	7	2	72	217	92
x – Utica Jr. Comets	44	30	11	3	63	211	132
x – Rockets Hockey Club	44	29	10	5	63	188	114
x – Connecticut Jr. Rangers	44	23	17	4	50	172	149
x – Hershey Cubs	44	14	29	1	29	148	226
x – Elmira Jr. Enforcers	44	11	27	6	28	141	227
x – P.A.L. Jr. Islanders	44	8	35	1	17	105	278
Buffalo Stampede	44	7	36	1	15	110	279
Jersey Hitmen	44	7	37	0	14	102	244

==== Midwest East Division ====
Team	GP	W	L	OTL	Pts	GF	GA
xy – Fort Wayne Spacemen	44	33	8	1	69	207	120
x – Metro Jets Development Program	44	28	14	2	58	134	86
x – Motor City Gamblers	43	26	13	4	56	199	162
x – Chicago Cougars	44	27	15	2	56	174	120
x – Chicago Crush	44	13	24	7	33	118	184
x – Battle Creek Kernels	44	11	32	1	23	103	221
x – Decatur Blaze	44	0	40	4	4	74	292

==== Midwest West Division ====
Team	GP	W	L	OTL	Pts	GF	GA
xy – Hudson Havoc	44	37	6	1	75	194	59
x – Minnesota Squatch	44	29	10	5	63	239	165
x – Minnesota Moose	44	28	15	1	57	186	135
x – Wisconsin Rapids RiverKings	44	23	19	2	48	159	133
x – Minnesota Blue Ox	44	19	22	3	41	146	165
x – Steele County Blades	44	19	22	3	41	136	162
x – Isanti Outlaws	44	20	33	1	41	149	200
x – Dells Ducks	44	12	29	3	27	116	217
Minnesota Mullets	44	7	36	1	15	89	209

==== Mountain Division ====
Team	GP	W	L	OTL	Pts	GF	GA
xyz – Utah Outliers	52	43	5	4	90	255	118
x – Ogden Mustangs	52	35	13	4	74	260	165
x – Pueblo Bulls	52	24	25	3	51	195	187
x – Northern Colorado Eagles	52	23	25	4	50	183	162
x – Idaho Falls Spud Kings	52	19	29	4	42	162	266
x – Provo Predators	52	19	32	1	39	161	227

==== New England Division ====
Team	GP	W	L	OTL	Pts	GF	GA
x – Northern Cyclones	44	36	7	1	73	182	90
x – Islanders Hockey Club	44	32	8	4	68	190	90
x – Boston Junior Bruins	44	29	14	1	59	157	118
x – Boston Advantage	44	23	18	3	49	154	130
x – Springfield Pics	44	23	19	2	48	144	150
x – Bridgewater Bandits	44	20	19	5	45	156	159
x – Twin City Thunder	44	16	24	4	36	129	176
x – South Shore Kings	44	14	26	4	32	103	152
New Hampshire Junior Monarchs	44	3	39	2	8	94	245

==== Northwest Division ====
Team	GP	W	L	OTL	Pts	GF	GA
xy – Vernal Oilers	44	34	5	5	73	284	132
x – Seattle Totems	42	25	14	3	53	196	165
x – Rock Springs Prospectors	44	15	27	2	32	145	243
x – Rogue Valley Royals	43	11	30	2	24	130	250
Bellingham Blazers	44	9	33	2	20	120	228

==== Pacific Division ====
Team	GP	W	L	OTL	Pts	GF	GA
xy – Fresno Monsters	46	38	7	1	77	269	129
x – Las Vegas Thunderbirds	46	34	9	3	71	278	148
x – Ontario Jr. Reign	46	34	11	1	69	268	154
x – San Diego Sabers	46	33	11	2	68	212	124
Bakersfield Roughnecks	45	16	27	2	34	130	211
Long Beach Shredders	46	8	34	4	20	135	281
Lake Tahoe Lakers	42	3	37	2	8	97	276

==== Southeast Division ====
Team	GP	W	L	OTL	Pts	GF	GA
xy – Charlotte Rush	44	33	7	4	70	208	101
x – Potomac Patriots	44	32	10	2	66	198	128
x – Richmond Generals	44	29	13	2	60	166	108
x – Carolina Jr. Hurricanes	44	26	17	1	53	168	140
Nashville Spartans	44	25	17	2	52	177	153
Hampton Roads Whalers	44	17	20	7	41	134	148

== Premier Division playoffs ==
Teams are reseeded after the quarterfinal rounds.

=== Divisional Round ===
==== Florida ====
Semifinals (Best-of-3)
1	Florida Eels	7	5	-
4	Palm Beach Typhoon	2	2	-
2	Atlanta Madhatters	3	3	-
3	Tampa Bay Juniors	4*	5	-

Note: * denotes overtime period(s)

==== Great Lakes ====
Quarterfinals (Best-of-3)
1	Toledo Cherokee	10	9	-
4	Cincinnati Jr. Cyclones	1	1	-
2	Metro Jets	6	7	-
3	Columbus Mavericks	0	3	-

Note: * denotes overtime period(s)

==== Mid-Atlantic ====
Quarterfinals (Best-of-3)
1	New York Aviators	6	15	-
8	P.A.L. Jr. Islanders	5	1	-
2	Wilkes-Barre/Scranton Knights	5	9	-
7	Elmira Jr. Enforcers	1	2	-
3	Utica Jr. Comets	13	8	-
6	Hershey Cubs	1	3	-
4	Rockets Hockey Club	7	0	5
5	Connecticut Jr. Rangers	4	3	2

Semifinals (Best-of-3)
1	New York Aviators	6*	6	-
4	Rockets Hockey Club	5	3	-
2	Wilkes-Barre/Scranton Knights	2	5	6
3	Utica Jr. Comets	5	1	2

Note: * denotes overtime period(s)

==== Midwest East ====
Quarterfinals (Best-of-3)
2	Metro Jets Development Program	12	12	-
7	Decatur Blaze	0	3	-
3	Motor City Gamblers	6	7	-
6	Battle Creek Kernels	3	2	-
4	Chicago Cougars	5	5	-
5	Chicago Crush	0	1	-

Semifinals (Best-of-3)
1	Fort Wayne Spacemen	1	4	9
4	Chicago Cougars	2*	1	2
2	Metro Jets Development Program	1	3	7
3	Motor City Gamblers	2*	1	1

Note: * denotes overtime period(s)

==== Midwest West ====
Quarterfinals (Best-of-3)
1	Hudson Havoc	9	12	-
8	Dells Ducks	0	0	-
2	Minnesota Squatch	6	6	-
7	Isanti Outlaws	3	3	-
3	Minnesota Moose	3*	4	-
6	Steele County Blades	2	2	-
4	Wisconsin Rapids RiverKings	6	2	3
5	Minnesota Blue Ox	2	4	0

Semifinals (Best-of-3)
1	Hudson Havoc	3	6	-
4	Wisconsin Rapids RiverKings	2	1	-
2	Minnesota Squatch	6	5	4
3	Minnesota Moose	0	8	10

Note: * denotes overtime period(s)

==== Mountain ====
Quarterfinals (Best-of-3)
3	Pueblo Bulls	0	3*	4
6	Provo Predators	5	2	2
4	Northern Colorado Eagles	1	4	-
5	Idaho Falls Spud Kings	4	6	-

Semifinals (Best-of-3)
1	Utah Outliers	8	9	-
5	Idaho Falls Spud Kings	1	0	-
2	Ogden Mustangs	7	2	5
3	Pueblo Bulls	1	3*	0

Finals (Best-of-3)
1	Utah Outliers	3	5*	-
5	Ogden Mustangs	0	4	-

Note: * denotes overtime period(s)

==== New England ====
Quarterfinals (Best-of-3)
1	Northern Cyclones	2	6	-
8	South Shore Kings	1	2	-
2	Islanders Hockey Club	3*	7	-
4	Boston Advantage	2	3	-
3	Boston Junior Bruins	4	5	-
7	Twin City Thunder	1	3	-
5	Springfield Pics	2	2	-
6	Bridgewater Bandits	3	3*	-

Semifinals (Best-of-3)
1	Northern Cyclones	0	7	6
6	Bridgewater Bandits	2	3	2
2	Islanders Hockey Club	4	7	-
3	Boston Junior Bruins	2	3	-

Note: * denotes overtime period(s)

==== Northwest ====
Semifinals (Best-of-3)
1	Vernal Oilers	9	6	-
4	Rogue Valley Royals	0	0	-
2	Seattle Totems	4	4	4
3	Rock Springs Prospectors	6	2	1

Final (Best-of-3)
1	Vernal Oilers	4	3	5
2	Seattle Totems	2	4	0

Note: * denotes overtime period(s)

==== Pacific ====
Semifinals (Best-of-3)
1	Fresno Monsters	5*	6	-
4	San Diego Sabers	4	1	-
2	Las Vegas Thunderbirds	7	5	-
3	Ontario Jr. Reign	5	1	-

Final (Best-of-3)
1	Fresno Monsters	4	4	-
2	Las Vegas Thunderbirds	5*	5	-

Note: * denotes overtime period(s)

==== Southeast ====
Semifinal (Best-of-3)
1	Charlotte Rush	2	2	5
4	Carolina Jr. Hurricanes	1	4	1
2	Potomac Patriots	3	5	1
3	Richmond Generals	4	3	6

Note: * denotes overtime period(s)

=== National Round ===
All games took place at the Nexus Center in Utica, New York.

==== Seeding games ====
March 23 – March 24
All of the qualifying teams played two games in the seeding round to determine their ranking. The two lowest-ranked teams would not qualify for the championship round and instead play in a consolation game.

Winning Team	Score	Losing Team	Score
Charlotte Rush	5	Minnesota Moose	1
Wilkes-Barre/Scranton Knights	5	Fort Wayne Spacemen	4
Richmond Generals	3	Utah Outliers	0
Hudson Havoc	4	Ogden Mustangs	0
New York Aviators	4	Vernal Oilers	1
Metro Jets	5	Las Vegas Thunderbirds	2
Toledo Cherokee	3	Islanders Hockey Club	1
Florida Eels	1*	Metro Jets Development Program	0
Wisconsin Rapids RiverKings	5	Ontario Jr. Reign	3
Florida Eels	5	Metro Jets Development Program	1
Northern Cyclones	4	Tampa Bay Juniors	0
Utah Outliers	3	Minnesota Moose	1
Metro Jets	7	New York Aviators	2
Toledo Cherokee	3	Vernal Oilers	1
Hudson Havoc	3	Wilkes-Barre/Scranton Knights	2
Ogden Mustangs	4	Charlotte Rush	3
Florida Eels	3*	Islanders Hockey Club	2
Northern Cyclones	3	Metro Jets Development Program	0
Richmond Generals	1	Fort Wayne Spacemen	0
Tampa Bay Juniors	4	Las Vegas Thunderbirds	2

Note: * denotes overtime or shootout games

Standings

Rank	Team	W	OTW	OTL	L	Pts	GF	GA	DIF
1	Richmond Generals	2	0	0	0	6	4	0	+4
2	Hudson Havoc	2	0	0	0	6	7	2	+5
3	Northern Cyclones	2	0	0	0	6	7	0	+7
4	Toledo Cherokee	2	0	0	0	6	6	2	+4
5	Metro Jets	2	0	0	0	6	12	4	+8
6	Florida Eels	0	2	0	0	4	4	2	+2
7	Charlotte Rush	1	0	0	1	3	8	5	+3
8	Wilkes-Barre/Scranton Knights	1	0	0	1	3	7	7	+0
9	Tampa Bay Juniors	1	0	0	1	3	4	6	-2
10	New York Aviators	1	0	0	1	3	6	8	-2
11	Utah Outliers	1	0	0	1	3	3	4	-1
12	Ogden Mustangs	1	0	0	1	3	4	7	-3
13	Islanders Hockey Club	0	0	1	1	1	3	6	-3
14	Metro Jets Development Program	0	0	1	1	1	0	4	-4
15	Fort Wayne Spacemen	0	0	0	2	0	4	6	-2
16	Las Vegas Thunderbirds	0	0	0	2	0	4	9	-5
17	Vernal Oilers	0	0	0	2	0	2	7	-5
18	Minnesota Moose	0	0	0	2	0	2	8	-6

==== Championship round ====
Eighthfinals (March 26)
1	Richmond Generals	6
16	Las Vegas Thunderbirds	3
2	Hudson Havoc	1
15	Fort Wayne Spacemen	4
3	Northern Cyclones	5
14	Metro Jets Development Program	1
4	Toledo Cherokee	2
13	Islanders Hockey Club	1
5	Metro Jets	4
12	Ogden Mustangs	2
6	Florida Eels	5
11	Utah Outliers	4
7	Charlotte Rush	5
10	New York Aviators	3
8	Wilkes-Barre/Scranton Knights	5
9	Tampa Bay Juniors	1

Quarterfinals (March 27)
1	Richmond Generals	3
15	Fort Wayne Spacemen	2
3	Northern Cyclones	2
8	Wilkes-Barre/Scranton Knights	1
4	Toledo Cherokee	0
7	Charlotte Rush	2
5	Metro Jets	1
6	Florida Eels	5

Semifinals (March 28)
1	Richmond Generals	0
7	Charlotte Rush	2
3	Northern Cyclones	4
6	Florida Eels	3

Championship (March 29)
7	Charlotte Rush	1
3	Northern Cyclones	3

Note: * denotes overtime period(s)

Consolation Game
Vernal Oilers defeat Minnesota Moose, 6–4
