= 2020–21 USPHL Premier season =

- League: United States Premier Hockey League; Premier
- Sport: Ice hockey
- Duration: Regular season September 18, 2020 – March 6, 2021; Postseason; March 2021
- Games: 50–43
- Teams: 62

Regular season
- Season champions: Metro Jets
- Top scorer: Jozef Martancik (Chicago Cougars)

USPHL Premier Playoffs
- Finals champions: Charlotte Rush
- Runners-up: Florida Eels

USPHL Premier seasons
- ← 2019–20 2021–22 →

The 2020–21 USPHL Premier season was the 8th season of the Premier Division of the United States Premier Hockey League (USPHL). The regular season ran from September 18, 2020 to March 6, 2021 with an unbalanced schedule. The Metro Jets won the regular season championship. The Charlotte Rush defeated the Florida Eels 2–0 in the Championship game.

== Member changes ==
- The fallout and uncertainty resulting from the COVID-19 pandemic contributed to the dissolution of the Connecticut Nighthawks and Lansing Wolves.
- After several years of substandard play, the USPHL removed the Rochester Monarchs organization from its ranks. The club's three teams (NCDC, Premier and Elite) all disbanded shortly thereafter.
- Due to the continuing disruptions from the pandemic, the Western States Hockey League announced that it would suspend play for the 2020–21 season. By April 2020, nine of its member teams (Fresno Monsters, Las Vegas Thunderbirds, Northern Colorado Eagles, Ogden Mustangs, Ontario Avalanche, Pueblo Bulls, San Diego Sabers, Southern Oregon Spartans, and Utah Outliers) had left the WSHL and joined the USPHL's Premier Division. The Ontario Avalanche would rebrand as the Anaheim Avalanche before the start of the season.
- After suspending play for the previous season due to uncertainty over the future of their home arena, the Wooster Oilers rejoined the Premier Division.
- On June 4, the USPHL announced the addition of the Elmira Jr. Enforcers as an expansion franchise. The team would begin play in the Premier Division this season.
- On June 9, The Boston Advantage were approved as expansion franchises to both the NCDC and Premier Divisions.
- A few days later, in order to help fill out the new western divisions, the USPHL approved the Provo Riverblades as an expansion franchise for this season. This allowed the USPHL to establish two 5-team divisions to help cut down on travel expenses.
- Due to problems resulting from the pandemic, the Southern Oregon Spartans had played the first part of the season on outdoor rinks. As their situation worsened, the team withdrew from the league on November 18th after playing just 6 games. While the team was hoping to return the following year, their home venue, The RRRink, decided against renewing the team's lease, forcing the club to disband.

== Regular season ==
The standings at the end of the regular season were as follows:

Note: x = clinched playoff berth; y = clinched division title; z = clinched regular season title

=== Standings ===
Due to positive COVID-19 tests, a few games were cancelled and not rescheduled.

==== Florida Division ====
Team	GP	W	L	OTL	Pts	GF	GA
xy – Florida Eels	44	31	13	0	62	226	120
x – Tampa Bay Juniors	44	29	13	2	60	182	144
x – Charleston Colonials	44	24	19	1	49	148	159
x – Atlanta Madhatters	44	16	23	5	37	134	187
Florida Jr. Blades	44	15	25	4	34	158	187

==== Great Lakes Division ====
Team	GP	W	L	OTL	Pts	GF	GA
xy – Metro Jets	43	38	4	1	77	234	74
x – Toledo Cherokee	44	33	9	2	68	241	103
x – Pittsburgh Vengeance	43	30	11	2	62	155	100
x – Columbus Mavericks	44	21	21	2	44	172	160
x – Lake Erie Bighorns	42	17	24	1	35	115	260
MHC	42	12	30	0	24	92	195
x – Wooster Oilers	43	8	33	2	18	111	248

==== Mid-Atlantic Division ====
Team	GP	W	L	OTL	Pts	GF	GA
xy – Rockets Hockey Club	44	33	9	2	68	230	121
x – Elmira Jr. Enforcers	44	28	14	2	58	169	132
x – Philadelphia Hockey Club	44	28	14	2	58	218	137
x – New Jersey Hitmen	44	15	25	4	34	155	212
x – New York Aviators	41	16	24	1	33	154	201
x – Utica Jr. Comets	42	14	26	2	30	150	199
Connecticut Jr. Rangers	40	14	25	1	29	124	170
x – Buffalo Thunder	39	12	25	2	26	111	173
x – Skipjacks Hockey Club	36	8	23	5	21	112	170
P.A.L. Jr. Islanders	40	6	29	5	17	96	245

==== Midwest East Division ====
Team	GP	W	L	OTL	Pts	GF	GA
xy – Metro Jets Development Program	44	31	8	5	67	220	95
x – Chicago Cougars	43	30	11	2	62	231	108
x – Fort Wayne Spacemen	44	23	13	8	54	186	152
x – Detroit Fighting Irish	43	20	21	2	42	183	217
Decatur Blaze	43	18	22	3	39	188	207
x – Midwest Blackbirds	44	12	30	2	26	134	255
x – Motor City Hockey Club	41	1	38	2	4	72	354

==== Midwest West Division ====
Team	GP	W	L	OTL	Pts	GF	GA
xy – Wisconsin Rapids RiverKings	44	37	5	2	76	260	84
x – Minnesota Moose	44	37	6	1	75	254	104
x – Hudson Havoc	44	36	5	3	75	226	86
x – Minnesota Blue Ox	44	29	14	1	59	204	134
x – Steele County Blades	44	23	20	1	47	217	168
x – Minnesota Mullets	44	19	20	5	43	157	168
x – Rum River Mallards	44	9	33	2	20	123	222
x – Rochester Vipers	44	9	33	2	20	137	302
Dells Ducks	43	3	38	2	8	65	356

==== Mountain Division ====
Team	GP	W	L	OTL	Pts	GF	GA
xy – Ogden Mustangs	50	29	17	4	62	202	159
x – Northern Colorado Eagles	49	28	19	2	58	173	153
x – Pueblo Bulls	49	27	19	3	57	170	156
x – Utah Outliers	45	24	18	3	51	159	154
Provo Riverblades	46	22	17	7	51	187	168

==== New England Division ====
Team	GP	W	L	OTL	Pts	GF	GA
xy – Islanders Hockey Club	43	37	6	0	74	229	81
x – Boston Junior Bruins	44	30	12	2	62	161	105
x – Northern Cyclones	38	27	10	1	55	161	74
x – Springfield Pics	44	23	18	3	49	130	127
x – Bridgewater Bandits	30	19	8	3	41	102	81
x – Twin City Thunder	33	20	12	1	41	132	108
x – South Shore Kings	36	17	18	1	35	132	110
x – New Hampshire Junior Monarchs	32	16	14	2	34	128	129
Boston Advantage	30	6	22	2	14	62	134

==== Pacific Division ====
Team	GP	W	L	OTL	Pts	GF	GA
xy – Fresno Monsters	40	28	10	2	58	227	124
x – Las Vegas Thunderbirds	40	24	14	2	50	196	149
x – Anaheim Avalanche	36	8	27	1	17	96	188
x – San Diego Sabers	43	3	39	1	7	81	269
Southern Oregon Spartans	6	0	6	0	0	9	61

==== Southeast Division ====
Team	GP	W	L	OTL	Pts	GF	GA
xy – Charlotte Rush	44	34	9	1	69	208	87
x – Carolina Jr. Hurricanes	44	28	12	4	60	157	128
x – Richmond Generals	44	26	17	1	53	177	128
x – Hampton Roads Whalers	44	24	18	2	50	185	141
Potomac Patriots	44	3	39	2	8	72	276

== Premier Division playoffs ==
Due to positive Covid tests, the Decatur Blaze were unable to participate in the postseason.

=== Divisional Round ===
Teams are reseeded after the quarterfinal rounds.

==== Florida ====
Semifinals (Best-of-3)
1	Florida Eels	2
4	Atlanta Madhatters	1
2	Tampa Bay Juniors	1
3	Charleston Colonials	2

Note: * denotes overtime period(s)

==== Great Lakes ====
Quarterfinals (Best-of-3)
3	Pittsburgh Vengeance	2
6	Wooster Oilers	0
4	Columbus Mavericks	2
5	Lake Erie Bighorns	1

Semifinals (Best-of-3)
1	Metro Jets	2
4	Columbus Mavericks	0
2	Toledo Cherokee	2
3	Pittsburgh Vengeance	0

Note: * denotes overtime period(s)

==== Mid-Atlantic ====
Quarterfinals (Best-of-3)
1	Rockets Hockey Club	2
8	Skipjacks Hockey Club	0
2	Elmira Jr. Enforcers	2
7	Buffalo Thunder	0
3	Philadelphia Hockey Club	2
6	Utica Jr. Comets	0
4	Jersey Hitmen	0
5	New York Aviators	2

Semifinals (Best-of-3)
1	Rockets Hockey Club	0
5	New York Aviators	2
2	Elmira Jr. Enforcers	2
3	Philadelphia Hockey Club	0

Note: * denotes overtime period(s)

==== Midwest East ====
Quarterfinals (Best-of-3)
3	Fort Wayne Spacemen	2
6	Motor City Hockey Club	0
4	Detroit Fighting Irish	2
5	Midwest Blackbirds	0

Semifinals (Best-of-3)
1	Metro Jets Development Program	2
4	Detroit Fighting Irish	0
2	Chicago Cougars	2
3	Metro Jets Development Program	1

Note: * denotes overtime period(s)

==== Midwest West ====
Quarterfinals (Best-of-3)
1	Wisconsin Rapids RiverKings	2
8	Rochester Vipers	0
2	Minnesota Moose	2
7	Rum River Mallards	0
3	Hudson Havoc	2
6	Minnesota Mullets	0
4	Minnesota Blue Ox	2
5	Steele County Blades	0

Semifinals (Best-of-3)
1	Wisconsin Rapids RiverKings	0
4	Minnesota Blue Ox	2
2	Minnesota Moose	2
3	Hudson Havoc	1

Note: * denotes overtime period(s)

==== Mountain ====
		OGD	NCE	PUE	UTA
1	Ogden Mustangs		1–4	2–3	1–4
2	Northern Colorado Eagles	4–1		4–5	3–1
3	Pueblo Bulls	3–2	5–4		3–5
4	Utah Outliers	4–1	1–3	5–3	

Semifinal (Best-of-1)			Final (Best-of-1)
			1	Utah Outliers	5
2	Pueblo Bulls	5	2	Pueblo Bulls	3
3	Northern Colorado Eagles	2

Note: * denotes overtime period(s)

==== New England ====
Due to Massachusetts quarantine requirements, the two New England Division teams from out of state (Northern Cyclones and New Hampshire Junior Monarchs) were paired in the quarterfinal round.

Quarterfinals (Best-of-3)
1	Islanders Hockey Club	2
7	South Shore Kings	0
2	Boston Junior Bruins	2
6	Twin City Thunder	1
3	Northern Cyclones	2
8	New Hampshire Junior Monarchs	2
4	Springfield Pics	2
5	Bridgewater Bandits	1

Semifinals (Best-of-3)
1	Islanders Hockey Club	2
5	Bridgewater Bandits	0
2	Boston Junior Bruins	0
3	Northern Cyclones	2

Note: * denotes overtime period(s)

==== Pacific ====
Semifinals (Best-of-1)
1	Fresno Monsters	6
4	San Diego Sabers	2
2	Las Vegas Thunderbirds	4
3	Anaheim Avalanche	0

Final (Best-of-1)
1	Fresno Monsters	7
2	Las Vegas Thunderbirds	2

Note: * denotes overtime period(s)

==== Southeast ====
Semifinal (Best-of-3)
1	Charlotte Rush	2
4	Hampton Roads Whalers	1
2	Carolina Jr. Hurricanes	2
3	Richmond Generals	1

Note: * denotes overtime period(s)

=== National Round ===
The 16 qualifying teams were sorted into four separate pools for Round Robin play. The top team from each pool would advance to the Championship round.

==== Round Robin ====
Pool A

		NOR	CHR	ELM	MET
1	Northern Cyclones		4–3	1–0	4–2
2	Charleston Colonials	3–4		9–3	1–0
3	Elmira Jr. Enforcers	0–1	3–9		4–2
4	Metro Jets	2–4	0–1	2–4	

Rank	Team	W	L	T	Pts	GF	GA
1	Northern Cyclones	3	0	0	6	9	5
2	Charleston Colonials	2	1	0	4	13	7
3	Elmira Jr. Enforcers	1	2	0	2	7	12
4	Metro Jets	0	3	0	0	4	9

Pool B

		FLE	MDP	NYA	MBO
1	Florida Eels		6–1	5–1	3–3
2	Metro Jets Development Program	1–6		7–1	5–2
3	New York Aviators	1–5	1–7		4–3
4	Minnesota Blue Ox	3–3	2–5	3–4	

Rank	Team	W	L	T	Pts	GF	GA
1	Florida Eels	2	0	1	5	14	5
2	Metro Jets Development Program	2	1	0	4	13	9
3	Minnesota Blue Ox	1	1	1	3	9	11
4	New York Aviators	0	3	0	0	5	16

Pool C

		CHA	IHC	UTA	CHC
1	Charlotte Rush		1–1	7–4	5–2
2	Islanders Hockey Club	1–1		4–2	4–2
3	Utah Outliers	4–7	2–4		2–1
4	Chicago Cougars	2–5	2–4	1–2	

Rank	Team	W	L	T	Pts	GF	GA
1	Charlotte Rush	2	0	1	5	18	7
2	Islanders Hockey Club	2	0	1	5	10	5
3	Utah Outliers	1	2	0	2	8	13
4	Chicago Cougars	0	3	0	0	5	16

Pool D

		CAR	TOL	FRE	MNM
1	Carolina Jr. Hurricanes		5–2	8–6	2–3
2	Toledo Cherokee	2–5		7–2	4–2
3	Fresno Monsters	6–8	2–7		8–6
4	Minnesota Moose	3–2	2–4	6–8	

Rank	Team	W	L	T	Pts	GF	GA
1	Carolina Jr. Hurricanes	2	1	0	4	15	11
2	Toledo Cherokee	2	1	0	4	13	9
3	Fresno Monsters	1	2	0	2	16	21
4	Minnesota Moose	1	2	0	2	11	14

Games in italics indicate overtime or shootout results.

==== Championship round ====
Semifinals
A	Northern Cyclones	1
C	Charlotte Rush	10
B	Florida Eels	4
D	Carolina Jr. Hurricanes	1

Championship
C	Charlotte Rush	2
B	Florida Eels	0

Note: * denotes overtime period(s)
