= Rogue Valley Royals =

- City: Medford, Oregon
- League: United States Premier Hockey League Premier
- Division: pacific
- Founded: 2022
- Colors: Grey, powderblue, white
- Owners: Bobby and Ali Ruddle
- Head coach: Bobby Ruddle

Franchise history
- 2022–present: Rogue Valley Royals

The Rogue Valley Royals are a junior ice hockey team that is currently a member of the United States Premier Hockey League's (USPHL) Premier Division. The Royals play their home games at the RRRink in Medford, Oregon.

== History ==
In August 2021, the Western States Hockey League granted a new team to Medford at the RRRink under a different ownership group, later called the Rogue Valley Royals. However, the Royals never played in the WSHL as the league never resumed play after the COVID-19 pandemic. Instead, the Royals joined the USPHL in 2022.

== Season-by-season records ==
Season	GP	W	L	OTL	SOL	Pts	GF	GA	PIM	Finish	Playoffs
2022–23	44	11	30	1	1	24	130	250	630	4th of 5, Northwest; 58th of 70, Premier	Lost Div. Semifinal series, 0–2 (Vernal Oilers)
2023–24	44	13	29	2	0	28	119	227	612	4th of 5, Northwest; 45th of 61, Premier	Lost Div. Semifinal series, 0–2 (Vernal Oilers)
2024–25	44	9	34	0	1	19	91	268	640	5th of 7, Northwest; 63rd of 73, Premier	Did Not Qualify
2025–26	44	4	39	1	0	9	112	351	861	6th of 7, Northwest; 75rd of 77, Premier	Did Not Qualify
