= Typhoon Hockey Club =

- City: Lake Worth, Florida
- League: United States Premier Hockey League; Premier Division
- Division: Florida
- Founded: 2021
- Home arena: Palm Beach Skate Zone
- Colors: Red, black and gray
- Owners: Bill Flanagan and Joe Flanagan
- General manager: Joe Flanagan
- Head coach: Joe Flanagan
- Affiliates: Northern Cyclones

Franchise history
- 2021–2025: Palm Beach Typhoon
- 2025–present: Typhoon Hockey Club

The Typhoon Hockey Club are a Tier III junior ice hockey team playing in the United States Premier Hockey League's (USPHL) Premier Division. The Madhatters play their home games at the Palm Beach Skate Zone in Lake Worth, Florida.

== History ==
In March of 2021, the USPHL approved the Palm Beach Typhoon as expansion teams for both the Premier and Elite Divisions. The team reached an affiliation arrangement with the NCDC's Northern Cyclones, who also operate teams in the Premier and Elite Divisions. As a result, the Typhoon share both their colors and logo with the Cyclones.

The franchise re-branded to the Tyhoon Hockey Club for their return to action.

== Season-by-season records ==
Season	GP	W	L	OTL	Pts	GF	GA	Regular season finish	Playoffs
2021–22	44	8	33	3	19	126	250	5th of 5, Florida Div. t-59th of 64, USPHL Premier	Did not qualify
2022–23	44	23	20	1	47	181	180	4th of 6, Florida Div. 39th of 70, USPHL Premier	Lost Div. Semifinal series, 0–2 (Florida Eels)
2023–24	44	8	32	4	20	99	184	6th of 6, Florida Div. 52nd of 61, USPHL Premier	Did not qualify
2024–25	25	3	22	0	6	121	168	6th of 6, Florida Div. 73rd of 73, USPHL Premier	Suspended play in January
2025–26	44	11	31	2	24	109	208	5th of 5, Florida Div. 62nd of 77, USPHL Premier	Lost Quarterfinal game 3-12 (Florida Jr Blades)
