= Atlanta Madhatters =

Buffalo Steel
- City: Buffalo, New York
- League: United States Premier Hockey League; Premier Division
- Division: Florida (2019-2025); New England (2026=present Mid-Atlantic (2025-2026)
- Founded: 2019
- Home arena: Atlanta Ice House
- Colors: Red, black and grey

Franchise history
- 2019-2026: Atlanta Madhatters
- 2026-present: Buffalo Steel

Championships
- Regular season titles: 0
- Division titles: 0
- Playoff championships: 0

The Atlanta Madhatters were a Tier III junior ice hockey team playing in the United States Premier Hockey League's (USPHL) Premier Division. The Madhatters played their home games at the PNY Sports Arena in West Chester, Pennsylvania.The club initially began playing games at the Atlanta Ice House in Marietta, Georgia. But due to roster issues, fielded only an Elite team in the 2025-26 season, and relocated to West Chester, Pennsylvania. It was announced in June 2026, that the team was sold and relocated to Buffalo, New York becoming the Buffalo Steel.

== History ==
In April 2019, The USPHL announced the addition of the Atlanta Madhatters to both the Premier and Elite Divisions for the 2019–20 season.

In September 2025, the team relocated temporarily to West Chester, Pennsylvania due to roster limitations, while only fielding a USPHL Elite team. The team was also moved to the Mid-Atlantic Division of the Elite Conference.

In June 2026, the team was sold and relocated to Buffalo, New York, becoming the Buffalo Steel. Fielding a USPHL Premier Team.

[2]

== Season-by-season records ==
Season	GP	W	L	OTL	Pts	GF	GA	Regular season finish	Playoffs
2019–20	44	11	29	4	26	110	191	5th of 5, Florida Div. t-41st of 52, USPHL Premier	Did not qualify
2020–21	44	16	23	5	37	134	187	4th of 5, Florida Div. 39th of 62, USPHL Premier	Lost Div. Semifinal series, 1–2 (Florida Eels)
2021–22	44	18	25	1	37	143	188	4th of 5, Florida Div. t-47th of 64, USPHL Premier	Lost Div. Semifinal series, 0–2 (Florida Eels)
2022–23	44	24	16	4	52	178	147	3rd of 6, Florida Div. t-30th of 70, USPHL Premier	Lost Div. Semifinal series, 0–2 (Tampa Bay Juniors)
2023–24	44	24	17	3	51	142	138	4th of 6, Florida Div. t-29th of 61, USPHL Premier	Lost Div. Semifinal series, 1–2 (Bold City Battalion)
2024–25	42	15	25	2	32	121	168	4th of 6, Florida Div. 54th of 73, USPHL Premier	Lost Div. Play-in, 2–5 (Florida Jr. Blades)
2025–26	43	12	30	1	25	122	203	6th of 6, Atlantic Div. 22nd of 27, USPHL Elite	Didnot qualify
BUFFALO STEEL
