= P.A.L. Jr. Islanders (Tier III) =

- City: Hauppauge, New York
- League: United States Premier Hockey League; Premier Division
- Division: Atlantic
- Founded: 2015
- Home arena: Northwell Health Ice Center
- Colors: Orange, white, and blue
- Head coach: Frank DiChiara
- Affiliates: P.A.L. Jr. Islanders

Franchise history
- 2015–present: P.A.L. Jr. Islanders

The P.A.L. Jr. Islanders (Pride and Athletics for Life) are a Tier III junior ice hockey team playing in the Premier Division of the United States Premier Hockey League (USPHL). The organization operates several other teams at varying levels of play with two others in the USPHL's NCDC and Elite divisions that are also called P.A.L. Jr. Islanders.

== History ==
The parent organization was founded a few years after the New York Islanders hit the ice. The two have remain tied together ever since with the Jr. Islanders helping to lay the groundwork for junior hockey throughout Long Island. The organization joined the USPHL as a founding member in 2013, starting with a new team in the then-top division (Premier). Two years later, the club founded a secondary junior club which joined the Elite Division.

In 2017, the USPHL announced that it would be founding a new Tier II division called the National Collegiate Development Conference. Both of the Jr. Islanders program were promoted one level (Premier joining NCDC and Elite joining Premier). A year after their promotion, the Islanders were forced to suspend play for a year but returned to the Premier Division in 2019. The organization later returned to the Elite Division when they founded a third club in 2022.

== Season-by-season records ==
Season	GP	W	L	OTL	Pts	GF	GA	Regular season finish	Playoffs
USPHL Elite
2015–16	44	14	24	6	34	125	156	8th of 10, North Div. 16th of 20, USPHL Elite	Lost Div. Quarterfinal series, 0–2 (Islanders Hockey Club)
2016–17	44	21	20	3	45	158	171	7th of 10, Northern Div. 18th of 27, USPHL Elite	Lost Div. Quarterfinal series, 0–2 (South Shore Kings)
USPHL Premier
2017–18	44	6	38	0	12	96	270	9th of 9, Mid-Atlantic Div. t-43rd of 44, USPHL Premier	Did not qualify
2018–19	Did not play								
2019–20	44	10	32	2	22	116	169	6th of 7, Mid-Atlantic Div. 45th of 52, USPHL Premier	Lost Div. Quarterfinal series, 1–2 (Philadelphia Hockey Club)
2020–21	40	6	29	5	17	96	245	10th of 10, Mid-Atlantic Div. t-55th of 62, USPHL Premier	Did not qualify
2021–22	44	16	24	4	36	141	195	6th of 7, Atlantic East Div. 50th of 64, USPHL Premier	Did not qualify
2022–23	44	8	35	1	17	105	278	8th of 10, Mid-Atlantic Div. 62nd of 70, USPHL Premier	Lost Div. Quarterfinal series, 0–2 (New York Aviators)
2023–24	44	25	16	3	53	179	152	t-4th of 8, Atlantic Div. t-27th of 61, USPHL Premier	Lost Div. Quarterfinal series, 0–2 (Elmira Impact)
2024–25	44	22	16	6	50	175	166	t-6th of 11, Atlantic Div. 34th of 73, USPHL Premier	Won Div. Quarterfinal series, 2–1 (Elmira Impact); Won Div. Semifinal series, 2–1 (Rockets Hockey Club); Won Div. Final series, 2–0 (Wilkes-Barre/Scranton Knights); Lost Division 1 Round-Robin, 8–5 (Fresno Monsters), 0–2 (Metro Jets), 5–1 (Minnesota Squatch)
2025–26	44	29	11	4	62	198	133	t-4th of 10, Atlantic Div. t-22nd of 77, USPHL Premier	Won Div. Quarterfinal series, 2-0 (Wilkes-Barre/Scranton Knights); Lost Div Semifinals 0-2 (West Chester Wolves)
