= Rockets Hockey Club (Tier III) =

- City: Bridgewater, New Jersey
- League: United States Premier Hockey League; Premier Division
- Founded: 2004
- Home arena: Bridgewater Sports Arena
- Colors: Red, black and silver
- Owner: Rockets Sports Group
- Affiliates: Rockets Hockey Club

Franchise history
- 2004–2019: New Jersey Rockets
- 2019–present: Rockets Hockey Club

Championships
- Regular season titles: 2020
- Division titles: 2008, 2018, 2020, 2021, 2022
- Playoff championships: 2022

The Rockets Hockey Club are a Tier III junior ice hockey team playing in the United States Premier Hockey League's (USPHL) Premier Division. The Rockets play their home games at the Bridgewater Sports Arena in Bridgewater, New Jersey.

== History ==
The New Jersey Rockets youth hockey organization was formed in 1970 to serve as a local developmental program. The club later reached an arrangement with the New Jersey Devils of the NHL for the use of the Meadowlands Arena and later the Prudential Center. In the early part of the 21st century,the Rockets expanded their footprint with the addition of a junior franchises to both the Metropolitan Junior Hockey League and the Atlantic Junior Hockey League (AJHL). This team was a founding member of the AJHL was it was organized in 2004. When the AJHL merged with the Eastern Junior Hockey League in 2013, the Rockets then became founding members of the successor league, the Eastern Hockey League. In 2016, the MJHL franchise withdrew and joined the EHL's Elite (lower) division. One year later, New Jersey left the EHL and joined the rival United States Premier Hockey League as that league was creating a new, Tier II league.

When the Rockets joined the USPHL, their existing Tier III club joined the Premier Division (also Tier III) while the former Elite club joined the USPHL's Elite Division. The organization founded a separate Tier II franchise which began play in the National Collegiate Development Conference (NCDC) that same year. The entire organization rebranded as the Rockets Hockey Club in 2019.

The organization previously fielded a team at the Tier III former Junior B level in the Metropolitan Junior Hockey League (MJHL) and in the EHL-Elite Division. The organization also fields a women's team in the New England Women's Junior Hockey League (NEWJHL), and youth hockey select teams at the Midget U18, Midget 16U, Bantam, Peewee, and Squirt and Mite levels and girls teams at the U14, U16, and U19 levels.

== Season-by-season records ==
Season	GP	W	L	T	OTL	Pts	GF	GA	Regular season finish	Playoffs
Atlantic Junior Hockey League
2004–05	41	24	14	0	3	51	137	125	2nd of 4, South; 3rd of 8, AJHL	Won Quarterfinals, ? (Portland Jr. Pirates); Lost Semifinal, 2–11 (New York Bobcats)
2005–06	42	16	17	0	9	41	146	153	7th of 11, AJHL	Lost Quarterfinals, 1–2 (Boston Bulldogs)
2006–07	44	23	18	0	3	49	198	173	4th of 6, South; 6th of 12, AJHL	Lost Quarterfinals, ? (Northern Cyclones)
2007–08	44	31	9	0	4	66	218	153	1st of 5, South; T-1st of 11, AJHL	Missing information
2008–09	42	27	14	0	1	55	182	125	2nd of 6, South; 4th of 12, AJHL	Missing information
2009–10	42	30	9	0	3	63	165	117	2nd of 6, South; 4th of 12, AJHL	Missing information
2010–11	44	19	23	0	2	40	141	164	3rd of 6, South; 8th of 12, AJHL	Missing information
2011–12	44	19	21	2	2	42	139	148	8th of 12, AJHL	Missing information
2012–13	44	20	18	5	1	46	141	137	7th of 12, AJHL	Won Quarterfinal series, 2–0 (Walpole Express); Lost Semifinal series, 0–2 (Northern Cyclones)
Eastern Hockey League
2013–14	44	21	20	2	1	45	132	162	2nd of 5, South; 9th of 17, EHL	Lost Round 1 series, 0–2 (Hartford Jr. Wolfpack)
2014–15	44	16	25	—	3	35	126	191	3rd of 5, South Div. 15th of 19, EHL	Lost Round 1 series, 0–2 (New Hampshire Junior Monarchs)
2015–16	41	20	18	—	3	43	163	162	7th of 9, South Conf. 12th of 18, EHL-Premier	Lost First Round series, 0–2 (Connecticut Oilers)
2016–17	48	26	20	—	2	54	167	141	4th of 4, Mid-Atlantic Div. 4th of 8, South Conf. 7th of 17, EHL-Premier	Won First Round series, 2–0 (Philadelphia Revolution); Won Quarterfinal series, 2–0 (Boston Jr. Rangers); Lost Semifinal series, 0–2 (Philadelphia Little Flyers)
USPHL Premier
2017–18	44	35	5	—	4	74	221	114	1st of 9, Mid-Atlantic Div. 3rd of 44, USPHL Premier	Won Div. Quarterfinal series, 2–1 (Hartford Jr. Wolfpack); Won Div. Semifinal series, 2–0 (Connecticut Jr. Rangers); Lost Pool Gold Round Robin, 6–2 (Chicago Cougars), 6–2 (Minnesota Moose), cancelled (Hampton Roads Whalers)
2018–19	43	21	20	—	2	44	124	150	4th of 6, Mid-Atlantic Div. 31st of 54, USPHL Premier	Won Div. Quarterfinal series, 2–0 (Philadelphia Hockey Club); Lost Div. Semifinal series, 1–2 (New York Aviators)
2019–20	44	38	6	—	0	76	249	79	1st of 7, Mid-Atlantic Div. 1st of 52, USPHL Premier	Won Div. Semifinal series, 2–0 (Skipjacks Hockey Club); Remainder of postseason cancelled
2020–21	44	33	9	—	2	68	230	121	1st of 10, Mid-Atlantic Div. t-7th of 62, USPHL Premier	Won Div. Quarterfinal series, 2–0 (Skipjacks Hockey Club); Lost Div. Semifinal series, 0–2 (New York Aviators)
2021–22	44	31	7	—	6	68	222	113	1st of 7, Atlantic East Div. t-9th of 64, USPHL Premier	Won Div. Semifinal series, 2–0 (Jersey Whalers); Won Div. Final series, 2–0 (New York Aviators); Won Pool B Round Robin, 7–1 (Hudson Havoc), 2–1 (Florida Eels), 6–2 (Chicago Cougars); Won Quarterfinal, 5–3 (Northern Cyclones); Won Semifinal, 3–2 (Florida Eels); Won Championship, 3–2 (Metro Jets)
2022–23	44	29	10	—	5	188	114	63	t-3rd of 7, Mid-Atlantic Div. t-19th of 70, USPHL Premier	Won Div. Quarterfinal series, 2–1 (Connecticut Jr. Rangers); Lost Div. Semifinal series, 0–2 (New York Aviators)
2023–24	44	22	17	—	5	49	162	158	6th of 8, Atlantic Div. t-33rd of 61, USPHL Premier	Won Div. Quarterfinal series, 2–0 (Hershey Cubs); Lost Div. Semifinal series, 0–2 (Connecticut Jr. Rangers)
2024–25	44	24	18	—	2	50	190	159	t-6th of 11, Atlantic Div. t-34th of 73, USPHL Premier	Won Div. Quarterfinal series, 2–1 (West Chester Wolves); Lost Div. Semifinal series, 0–3 (P.A.L. Jr. Islanders)
2025–26	43	16	26	—	1	33	152	201	7th of 10, Atlantic Div. 54th of 77, USPHL Premier	Lost Div. Quarterfinal series, 0-2 (Red Bank Generals); Lost Div. Semifinal series, 0–3 (P.A.L. Jr. Islanders)
