= Lake Tahoe Lakers =

- City: South Lake Tahoe, California
- League: United States Premier Hockey League NCDC
- Conference: West
- Division: Pacific
- Founded: 2021
- Home arena: South Lake Tahoe Ice Arena
- Colors: Blue, red and teal
- General manager: Andy Radke
- Head coach: Tyler Dill

Franchise history
- 2021–present: Lake Tahoe Lakers

The Lake Tahoe Lakers are a junior ice hockey team that is currently a member of the United States Premier Hockey League (USPHL) NCDC Division. The Lakers play their home games at the South Lake Tahoe Ice Arena in South Lake Tahoe, California.

== History ==
On April 21, 2021, the USPHL announced the approval of the Lake Tahoe Lakers as an expansion franchise for the upcoming season.

For the 2026-27 season the Lakers will be elevated to the NCDC Division.

== Season-by-season records ==
Season	GP	W	L	OTL	Pts	GF	GA	Finish	Playoffs
2021–22	44	22	21	1	45	198	183	3rd of 6, Pacific Div. t-36th of 64, USPHL Premier	Lost Div. Semifinal series, 0–2 (Las Vegas Thunderbirds)
2022–23	46	3	37	2	8	97	276	7th of 7, Pacific Div. t-67th of 70, USPHL Premier	Did not qualify
2023–24	46	18	24	4	40	147	195	5th of 7, Pacific Div. t-40th of 61, USPHL Premier	Did not qualify
2024–25	46	33	10	3	69	278	148	2nd of 8, Pacific Div. t-9th of 73, USPHL Premier	Lost Div. Semifinal series, 0–2 (Ontario Jr. Reign)
2025–26	46	9	36	1	19	132	284	7th of 7, Pacific Div. 67th of 77, USPHL Premier	Did not qualify
