= Jersey Hitmen (Tier III) =

Ice hockey team in Wayne, New Jersey, United States

- City: Wayne, New Jersey
- League: USPHL
- Founded: 2003
- Home arena: Ice Vault Arena
- Colors: Navy blue, Carolina blue, and white
- Owner: Bobby Reiss
- General manager: James Hunt
- Affiliate: Jersey Hitmen

Championships
- Regular season titles: 2010–11, 2012–13, 2014–15
- Division titles: 2007–08, 2008–09, 2010–11, 2012–13
- Playoff championships: 2008, 2009, 2013, 2015, 2016

The Jersey Hitmen are a Tier III junior ice hockey team playing in the United States Premier Hockey League's (USPHL), Premier Division. The organization also has junior teams in the USPHL's NCDC and Elite Divisions, as well as multiple youth teams from 10U to 18U. The teams play their home games at the Ice Vault Arena in Wayne, New Jersey.

== History ==
The Hitmen's Tier III club was founded in 2003 and joined the Eastern Junior Hockey League the same year. In 2013, US junior hockey experienced a significant realignment that saw several leagues merge and discontinue. As the deck chairs were shuffled, the then-New Jersey Hitmen joined with several former EJHL clubs to form the United States Premier Hockey League and continue under the umbrella of USA Hockey sanctioning. Four years later, when the league became a fully independent organization, the USPHL created a separate Tier II circuit called the National Collegiate Development Conference. New Jersey was one of several teams to found a new program and have it compete in the new league. Unfortunately, as a result of directing most of its attention to the new club, the Jersey Hitmen's Tier III franchise began to suffer and the team went through an extended slump and hasn't posted a winning record since 2019 (as of 2025).

== Regular season records ==
Season	GP	W	L	T	OTL	PTS	GF	GA	Finish	Postseason
Eastern Junior Hockey League
2003–04	Missing information									Did not qualify
2004–05	53	14	26	7	6	91	131	159	6th Southern	Did not qualify
2005–06	45	20	20	2	3	45	153	158	5th Southern	Lost 1st Round
2006–07	45	16	24	4	1	37	127	164	7th Southern	Did not qualify
2007–08	45	30	7	7	1	68	176	126	1st Southern	Won Quarterfinal series, 2–0 (New England Junior Huskies); Won Semifinal series, 2–0 (South Shore Kings); Won Championship series, 2–0 (New Hampshire Junior Monarchs)
2008–09	45	35	7	4	0	72	236	98	1st Southern	Won Quarterfinal series, 2–0 (New England Junior Huskies); Won Semifinal series, 2–0 (Bridgewater Bandits); Won Championship series, 2–1 (New Hampshire Junior Monarchs)
2009–10	49	32	5	5	3	72	223	111	2nd Southern	Won Quarterfinal series, 2–0 (Syracuse Stars); Lost Semifinal series, ? (South Shore Kings)
2010–11	45	27	14	—	4	58	277	82	1st Southern; 1st EJHL	Won Quarterfinal series, 2–1 (New York Apple Core); Won Semifinals, 2–1 (Bay State Breakers); Lost Championship series, 0–2 (New Hampshire Junior Monarchs)
2011–12	45	27	14	—	4	58	277	82	2nd Southern; 4th EJHL	Won Quarterfinal series, 2–0 (Valley Jr. Warriors); Won Semifinal series, 2–0 (Boston Junior Bruins); Lost Championship series, 0–2 (New Hampshire Junior Monarchs)
2012–13	45	39	6	—	0	78	246	99	1st Southern; 1st EJHL	Won Quarterfinal series, (New Hampshire Junior Monarchs); Won Semifinal series, (Bay State Breakers); Won Championship, (Islanders Hockey Club)
United States Premier Hockey League
2013–14	48	36	11	—	1	73	209	106	2nd of 9, USPHL Premier	Won Quarterfinal series, 2–0 (Bay State Breakers); Won Semifinal series, 2–0 (South Shore Kings); Lost Championship series, 0–2 (Boston Junior Bruins)
2014–15	50	44	4	—	2	90	272	117	1st of 11, USPHL Premier	Won Quarterfinal series, 2–0 (Bay State Breakers); Won Semifinal series, 2–0 (South Shore Kings); Lost Championship series, 0–2 (Boston Junior Bruins)
2015–16	44	34	9	—	1	69	206	123	2nd of 12, USPHL Premier	Won Quarterfinal series, 2–0 (Rochester Jr. Americans); Won Semifinal series, 2–0 (South Shore Kings); Won Championship series, 2–0 (Philadelphia Jr. Flyers)
2016–17	45	32	9	—	4	68	200	102	2nd of 10, USPHL Premier	Won Quarterfinal series, 2–1 (Connecticut Jr. Rangers); Won Semifinal series, 2–0 (Boston Junior Bruins); Won Championship series, 2–0 (Islanders Hockey Club)
2017–18	44	25	16	—	3	53	160	142	3rd of 9, Mid-Atlantic Div. t-17th of 44, USPHL Premier	Won Div. Quarterfinal series, 2–1 (Connecticut Nighthawks); Won Div. Semifinal series, 2–0 (New York Aviators); Lost National Pool Black Round Robin, 6–0 (Motor City Hawks), 2–1 (Wisconsin Rapids RiverKings), 0–6 (Charlotte Rush)
2018–19	43	26	13	—	4	56	148	120	3rd of 6, Mid-Atlantic Div. 19th of 54, USPHL Premier	Won Div. Quarterfinal series, 2–0 (Jersey Shore Whalers); Won Div. Semifinal series, 2–0 (Skipjacks Hockey Club); Lost National Pool Z Round Robin, 2–1 (Minnesota Moose), 1–6 (Boston Bandits), 0–8 (Motor City Hockey Club)
2019–20	44	12	29	—	3	27	116	169	5th of 7, Mid-Atlantic Div. 40th of 52, USPHL Premier	Lost Div. Quarterfinal series, 0–2 (Skipjacks Hockey Club)
2020–21	44	15	25	—	4	34	155	212	4th of 10, Mid-Atlantic Div. 42nd of 62, USPHL Premier	Lost Div. Quarterfinal series, 0–2 (New York Aviators)
2021–22	44	17	24	—	3	37	121	192	5th of 7, Atlantic East t-47th of 64, USPHL Premier	Did not qualify
2022–23	44	7	36	—	1	14	102	244	10th of 10, Mid-Atlantic t–64th of 70, USPHL Premier	Did not qualify
2023–24	44	12	28	—	4	28	148	222	7th of 8, Atlantic t–45th of 61, USPHL Premier	Lost Div. Quarterfinal series, 0–2 (Wilkes-Barre/Scranton Knights)
2024–25	44	15	26	—	3	33	131	199	9th of 11, Atlantic; 54th of 73, USPHL Premier	Did not qualify
2025–26	44	9	35	—	-	18	89	227	9th of 10, Atlantic; 68th of 77, USPHL Premier	Did not qualify
