= Islanders Hockey Club (Tier III) =

- City: Tyngsborough, Massachusetts
- League: United States Premier Hockey League; Premier Division
- Division: New England
- Founded: 1993
- Home arena: Gallant Arena
- Colors: Navy, orange and white
- Head coach: Jay Punsky
- Affiliate: Islanders Hockey Club

Franchise history
- 1993–2000: Tyngsboro Huskies
- 2000–2004: Lowell Junior Lock Monsters
- 2004–2012: New England Junior Huskies
- 2012–present: Islanders Hockey Club

Championships
- Regular season titles: 2 (2016, 2017)
- Division titles: 3 (2020, 2021, 2025)
- Playoff championships: 1 (2017)

The Islanders Hockey Club are an American Tier III junior ice hockey organization from Tyngsborough, Massachusetts. They field teams in the United States Premier Hockey League's Premier Division.

== History ==
=== New England Huskies Junior Hockey Club ===
Logo from 2004–2012

The New England Huskies Junior Hockey Club is a non-profit 501-3 organization which chartered in 1993 as the Tyngsboro Huskies as a charter member of the Eastern Junior Hockey League (EJHL). The New England Junior Huskies trace their roots to 1981 and Fitchburg's "Wallace Wallopers" of the now-defunct New England Junior Hockey League (NEJHL). The team was renamed the Tyngsboro Huskies in 1993when it joined the EJHL and renamed again in 2000 to the Lowell Junior Lock Monsters, before becoming the New England Junior Huskies in 2004.

The stated purpose of the program is to provide a vehicle for athletes to develop as hockey players and to use these gifts to further their educational careers. Players are prepared for the long-term future as productive citizens while being constantly reminded to give the game of hockey its due respect for lessons learned. All Junior Huskies players are required to be in school and/or work, and are required to take the Scholastic Aptitude Test (SAT) tutorial classes that are provided by the organization.

=== Islanders Hockey Club ===
In September 2010, the New England Huskies and the Middlesex Islanders announced that their programs would be merging creating one of the premier developmental and competitive hockey programs in New England. In 2012, the program announced that they were becoming the Islanders Hockey Club.

The next major change for the Islanders was in the fall of 2012 when they announced that they would be one of the founding members of the new United States Premier Hockey League (USPHL).

== Junior A team ==
Before the 2011–12 season USA Hockey had split Tier III junior hockey into Junior A and B divisions. Their former Junior A team now competes in the National Collegiate Development Conference of the USPHL. Prior to the 2013–14 season, the Islanders Junior A team were members of the Northern Division of the Eastern Junior Hockey League (EJHL). The team then joined the Premier Division in the new USPHL until the USPHL started the Tier II NCDC League in 2017.

=== Team members and regular season ===
The Islanders typically hold tryouts in late April. The team is usually composed of 12 to 13 forwards, six to seven defensemen, and two goalies on the active roster. All players are between the ages of 16 and 20. The season starts the day after Labor Day and playoffs finish during the third week of March each year and practices 3 to 4 times per week.

The schedule includes regular season games plus three rounds of playoffs.

== Season-by-season records ==
Season	GP	W	L	T	OTL	Pts	GF	GA	Regular season finish	Playoffs
Tyngsboro Huskies
1993–97	No statistics available								EJHL	
1997–98	37	11	26	0	—	22	97	196	6th of 8, EJHL	
1998–99	37	16	17	4	—	36	148	178	5th of 8, EJHL	
1999–2000	40	19	16	5	—	43	151	151	8th of 11, EJHL	
Lowell Jr. Lock Monsters
2000–01	No statistics available								8th, EJHL	Lost Quarterfinal, 2–6 (Walpole Stars)
2001–02	38	11	23	3	1	26	95	152	4th of 6, EJHL North	Lost Quarterfinal, 0–7 (New York Apple Core)
2002–03	38	12	20	5	1	30	94	133	3rd of 6, EJHL North	Lost Quarterfinals, ? (Walpole Stars)
2003–04	38	19	16	2	1	41	118	116	3rd of 6, EJHL North	Lost Quarterfinals, ? (New England Jr. Coyotes)
New England Jr. Huskies
2004–05	49	20	20	5	4	49	136	157	5th of 6, EJHL North	Lost Play-in, 3–5 (Capital District Selects)
2005–06	45	18	22	4	1	41	154	157	5th of 7, EJHL North	Did not qualify
2006–07	45	26	13	5	1	58	192	136	3rd of 7, EJHL North	Won Quarterfinal, 2–0 (Bridgewater Bandits); Lost Semifinal series, 1–1 (New Hampshire Junior Monarchs)
2007–08	45	13	26	3	3	32	150	188	5th of 7, EJHL North	Won Play-in, 7–5 (Valley Jr. Warriors); Lost Quarterfinal series, 0–2 (New Jersey Hitmen)
2008–09	45	19	22	4	0	42	141	153	4th of 7, EJHL North	Lost Quarterfinal series, 0–1–1 (New Jersey Hitmen)
2009–10	45	6	32	5	2	19	107	222	7th of 7, North; 14th of 14, EJHL	Did not qualify
2010–11	45	13	27	4	1	31	111	177	4th of 7, North; 11th of 14, EJHL	Lost First Round series, 0–1–1 (New York Apple Core)
2011–12	45	20	22	—	3	43	139	161	5th of 7, North; 9th of 14, EJHL	Won First Round series, 1–0–1 (Boston Bandits); Lost Quarterfinal series, 0–2 (Boston Junior Bruins)
Islanders Hockey Club
2012–13	45	31	11	—	3	65	183	118	2nd of 7, North; 3rd of 14, EJHL	Won Quarterfinal series, ? (Valley Jr. Warriors); Won Semifinal series, ? (Rochester Stars); Lost Championship, ? (New Jersey Hitmen)
2013–14	48	23	21	—	4	50	159	157	5th of 9, USPHL Premier	Won Quarterfinal series, 2–1 (Philadelphia Jr. Flyers); Lost Semifinal series, 0–2 (New Jersey Hitmen)
2014–15	50	27	19	—	4	58	183	164	4th of 11, USPHL Premier	Won Quarterfinal series, 2–0 (P.A.L. Jr. Islanders); Lost Semifinal series, 0–2 (Philadelphia Jr. Flyers)
2015–16	44	36	8	—	0	72	184	105	1st of 12, USPHL Premier	Won Quarterfinal series, 2–0 (Rochester Jr. Americans); Won Semifinal series, 2–0 (South Shore Kings; Lost Championship, 0–2 (New Jersey Hitmen)
2016–17	45	38	6	—	1	77	209	100	1st of 10, USPHL Premier	Won Quarterfinal series, 2–0 (P.A.L. Jr. Islanders); Won Semifinal series, 2–0 (Springfield Pics); Won Championship series, 2–0 (Boston Junior Bruins)
2017–18	44	29	9	—	6	64	179	113	2nd of 9, North Div. 7th of 44, USPHL Premier	Won Div. Quarterfinal series, 2–0 (Springfield Pics); Won Div. Semifinal series, 2–0 (South Shore Kings); Won Black Pool B Round-Robin, 4–3 (Motor City Hawks), 4–3 (Florida Eels), 2–0 (Wisconsin Rapids RiverKings); Lost Semifinal, 1–2 (Hampton Roads Whalers)
2018–19	44	25	14	—	5	55	128	108	5th of 7, New England Div. 20th of 52, USPHL Premier	Lost Div. Quarterfinal series, 1–2 (New Hampshire Junior Monarchs)
2019–20	44	36	5	—	3	75	209	89	1st of 7, New England Div. 2nd of 52, USPHL Premier	Won Div. Semifinal series, 2–1 (Boston Junior Bruins); Remainder of postseason cancelled
2020–21	43	37	6	—	0	74	229	81	1st of 9, New England Div. 5th of 62, USPHL Premier	Won Div. Quarterfinal series, 2–0 (South Shore Kings); Won Div. Semifinal series, 2–0 (Bridgewater Bandits); Lost Pool C Round-Robin, 1–1 (Charlotte Rush), 4–2 (Utah Outliers), 4–2 (Chicago Cougars)
2021–22	44	21	19	—	4	46	116	119	6th of 9, New England Div. 35th of 64, USPHL Premier	Won Div. Quarterfinal series, 2–1 (Bridgewater Bandits); Won Div. Semifinal series, 2–0 (Boston Junior Bruins); Lost Pool A Round-Robin, 4–7 (Metro Jets), 4–8 (Florida Jr. Blades), 2–3 (Wilkes-Barre/Scranton Knights)
2022–23	44	32	8	—	4	68	190	90	2nd of 9, New England Div. t-16th of 70, USPHL Premier	Won Div. Quarterfinal series, 2–0 (Boston Advantage); Won Div. Semifinal series, 2–0 (Boston Junior Bruins); Won Seeding Round, 1–3 (Toledo Cherokee), 2–3 (OT) (Florida Eels); Lost Eightfinal, 1–2 (Toledo Cherokee)
2023–24	44	22	15	—	7	51	144	141	3rd of 7, New England t-29th of 61, USPHL Premier	Won Div. Quarterfinal series, 2–0 (South Shore Kings); Won Div. Semifinal series, 2–0 (Collège Universel Gatineau); Seeding Round, 1–7 (Metro Jets), 3–4 (OT) (Connecticut Jr. Rangers); Won Eightfinal, 8–5 (Nashville Spartans); Won Quarterfinal, 4–3 (Metro Jets); Won Semifinal, 3–1 (Florida Eels); Lost Championship, 4–5 (OT) (Connecticut Jr. Rangers)
2024–25	44	37	4	—	3	77	220	88	1st of 9, New England Div. 3rd of 73, USPHL Premier	Won Div. Quarterfinal series, 2–0 (Boston Junior Rangers); Won Div. Semifinal series, 2–1 (South Shore Kings); Lost Div. Championship series, 0–2 (Springfield Pics)

== Affiliates ==
The Islanders also field teams in the USPHL NCDC (Tier II) and Elite Divisions (equivalent to the former Tier III Junior B designation). The organization also supports several levels of youth hockey.
