= Bridgewater Bandits =

- City: Bridgewater, Massachusetts
- League: Eastern Hockey League
- Founded: 1996
- Home arena: Bridgewater Ice Arena
- Colors: Red, black, white
- Owner: Scott Harlow
- General manager: Scott Drevitch
- Head coach: Scott Drevitch

Franchise history
- 1996–2011: Bridgewater Bandits
- 2011–2020: Boston Bandits
- 2020–present: Bridgewater Bandits

The Bridgewater Bandits, previously called the Boston Bandits, are a Tier II junior ice hockey organization from Bridgewater, Massachusetts, in the United States, with teams playing in the United States Premier Hockey League. The organization plays home games at the Bridgewater Ice Arena.

== History ==
The Boston Bandits organization had a team in the Tier III Eastern Junior Hockey League (EJHL) from 1996 until its dissolution in 2013. The Bandits would then join the Atlantic Junior Hockey League which would reorganize and become the Eastern Hockey League (EHL) for the 2013–14 season.

The Bandits organization also fields teams in the lower level USPHL Premier Division, as well as youth hockey select teams at the Bantam, Peewee, and Squirt and various other levels. The Premier team originally played in the Empire Junior B Hockey League until 2013 and then the Metropolitan Junior Hockey League (MetJHL) from 2013 to 2015 at which point the EHL added the Elite Division and the former EHL teams were all promoted to the Premier Division. The MetJHL team then joined the EHL-Elite Division.

In 2017, the Bandits' organization left the EHL for the United States Premier Hockey League (USPHL). The USPHL was planning to launch the Tier II level league, which became the National Collegiate Development Conference (NCDC), for the 2017–18 season. However, the USPHL was denied the Tier II status by USA Hockey and the junior league went independent. The top level Bandits team joined the NCDC and the developmental team joined the Premier Division.

The Bandits sold their NCDC franchise to the Philadelphia Hockey Club for the 2020–21 season. The organization was then sold to Scott Harlow in December 2019 and the organization reverted to the Bridgewater Bandits identity beginning with the 2020–21 season.

In 2023, the Bandits rejoined the Eastern Hockey League, promoting both of their active franchises one level higher (USPHL Premier team joined the EHL (Tier II) level; USPHL Elite team joined EHL Premier (Tier III)).

== Season-by-season records ==
Season	GP	W	L	T	OTL	Pts	GF	GA	Regular season finish	Playoffs
Eastern Junior Hockey League
Bridgewater Bandits
1997–98	37	21	15	1	—	43	167	125	4th of 8, EJHL	
1998–99	37	10	23	4	—	24	113	170	7th of 8, EJHL	
1999–00	40	11	27	2	—	24	151	205	9th of 11, EJHL	
2000–01	no data								EJHL	
2001–02	38	8	26	1	2	20	103	201	6th of 6, South Div. 10th of 12, EJHL	
2002–03	38	11	22	4	1	27	101	194	5th of 6, South Div. 8th of 12, EJHL	
2003–04	38	6	28	3	1	16	104	192	T-5th of 6, South Div. T-9th of 12, EJHL	
2004–05	48	10	34	3	1	24	113	201	7th of 7, South Div. 12th of 13, EJHL	
2005–06	45	22	18	3	2	49	150	147	3rd of 7, South Div. 7th of 14, EJHL	Lost Quarterfinal series, 0–2 (Boston Junior Bruins)
2006–07	45	23	16	5	1	52	202	166	2nd of 7, South Div. 5th of 14, EJHL	Lost Quarterfinal series, 0–2 (New England Junior Huskies)
2007–08	45	24	15	2	4	54	179	143	2nd of 7, South Div. 5th of 14, EJHL	Lost Quarterfinal series, 0–2 (Boston Junior Bruins)
2008–09	45	23	13	6	3	55	180	155	2nd of 7, South Div. 5th of 14, EJHL	Won Quarterfinal series, 1–0–1 (Syracuse Stars); Lost Semifinal series, 0–2 (Jersey Hitmen)
2009–10	45	16	24	2	3	37	154	200	6th of 7, South Div. 11th of 14, EJHL	Did not qualify
2010–11	45	13	26	3	3	32	139	203	7th of 7, South Div. 10th of 14, EJHL	Did not qualify
Boston Bandits
2011–12	45	23	20	0	2	48	161	157	4th of 7, South Div. 7th of 14, EJHL	Lost First Round series, 0–1–1 (New England Junior Huskies)
2012–13	45	18	23	—	4	40	121	153	6th of 7, North Div. 10th of 14, EJHL	Lost First Round series, (Bay State Breakers)
Eastern Hockey League
2013–14	44	22	17	3	2	49	149	136	3rd of 5, North Div. 6th of 17, EHL	Won Round 1, 2–0 (New York Apple Core); Won Quarterfinals, 2–0 (New York Bobcats); Lost Semifinals, 1–2 (New Hampshire Junior Monarchs)
2014–15	44	18	20	—	6	42	118	138	3rd of 5, Boston Div. 11th of 19, EHL	Lost Round 1, 1–2 (Wilkes-Barre/Scranton Knights)
2015–16	41	30	7	—	4	64	155	93	1st of 9, North Conf. 2nd of 18, EHL Premier	Won First Round, 2–0 (New England Wolves); Lost Second Round, 0–2 (Walpole Express)
2016–17	48	23	24	—	1	47	146	163	5th of 6, Boston Div. 8th of 9, North Conf. 12 of 17, EHL Premier	Lost First Round, 0–2 (New Hampshire Junior Monarchs)
USPHL Premier
2017–18	44	26	15	—	3	55	151	124	5th of 9, North Div. t-15th of 44, USPHL Premier	Lost Div. Quarterfinal series, 0–2 (South Shore Kings)
2018–19	44	33	7	—	4	70	145	88	2nd of 7, New England Div. 5th of 52, USPHL Premier	Won Div. Semifinal series, 2–0 (South Shore Kings); Won Pool Z Round Robin, 6–1 (New Jersey Hitmen), 4–3 (Minnesota Moose), 7–1 (Motor City Hockey Club); Lost Semifinal, 1–5 (Hampton Roads Whalers)
2019–20	44	24	15	—	5	53	151	115	4th of 7, New England Div. t-20th of 52, USPHL Premier	Won Div. Quarterfinal series, 2–0 (Twin City Thunder); Won Div. Semifinal series, 2–0 (Northern Cyclones); Remainder of postseason cancelled
Bridgewater Bandits
2020–21	30	19	8	—	3	41	102	81	6th of 9, New England Div. 37th of 62, USPHL Premier	Won Div. Quarterfinal series, 2–1 (Springfield Pics); Lost Div. Semifinal series, 0–2 (Islanders Hockey Club)
2021–22	44	27	15	—	2	56	149	117	3rd of 9, New England Div. 24th of 64, USPHL Premier	Won Div. Quarterfinal series, 2–1 (Islanders Hockey Club)
2022–23	44	20	19	—	5	45	156	159	6th of 9, New England Div. 38th of 70, USPHL Premier	Won Div. Quarterfinal series, 2–0 (Springfield Pics); Lost Div. Semifinal series, 1–2 (Northern Cyclones)
Eastern Hockey League
2023–24	46	12	31	0	3	27	106	189	6th of 6, East Div. 22nd of 23, EHL	Did Not Qualify
2024–25	46	4	33	4	1	13	92	215	5th of 5, East Div. 16th of 16, EHL	Did Not Qualify
2025–26	50	9	34	4	3	25	113	219	3rd of 3, East Div. 19th of 20, EHL	Lost Div. Semifinal 0-2 (Express Hockey Club)
