= Brooklyn Aviators (USPHL) =

- City: Brooklyn, New York
- League: United States Premier Hockey League Premier
- Division: Atlantic
- Founded: 2017
- Home arena: Aviator Sports and Events Center
- Colors: Navy, aqua and white
- Head coach: Josh Fusco

Franchise history
- 2017–2023: New York Aviators
- 2023–present: Brooklyn Aviators

Championships
- Division titles: 2: 2019, 2023

The Brooklyn Aviators are a Tier III junior ice hockey team playing in the United States Premier Hockey League's (USPHL) Premier Division. The Aviators play their home games at Aviator Sports and Events Center.

== History ==
In 2010, the New York Aviators began sponsoring a local junior team of the same. Though the parent club would fold after the 2012 season, the junior team continued. In 2016, the Tier III franchise rights were sold and the team relocated to become the Long Beach Sharks. That same year, the Aviators organization downgraded its USPHL Elite club to the Empire division. A year later, the Aviators founded a second Tier III club which began playing in the Premier Division of the USPHL. In 2023, the club rebranded as the Brooklyn Aviators.

== Season-by-season records ==
Season	GP	W	L	OTL	SOL	Pts	GF	GA	Regular season finish	Playoffs
New York Aviators
2017–18	44	21	16	7	–	49	202	189	4th of 9 Mid-Atlantic Div. 21st of 44 USPHL Premier	Won Div. Quarterfinal series, 2–0 (Jersey Shore Whalers); Lost Div. Semifinal series, 0–2 (New Jersey Hitmen
2018–19	44	34	6	4	–	72	255	116	1st of 6, Mid-Atlantic Div. t-3rd of 54, USPHL Premier	Won Div. Semifinal series, 2–1 (New Jersey Rockets); Lost Group Y Round-Robin, 3–6 (Minnesota Blue Ox), 2–0 (New Hampshire Junior Monarchs), 1–3 (Charlotte Rush)
2019–20	44	34	8	2	–	70	263	121	2nd of 7, Mid-Atlantic Div. 5th of 52, USPHL Premier	Won Div. Semifinal series, 2–0 (Philadelphia Hockey Club); Remainder of postseason cancelled
2020–21	41	16	24	1	–	33	154	201	5th of 10, Mid Atlantic Div. 45th of 62, USPHL Premier	Won Div. Quarterfinal series, 2–0 (New Jersey Hitmen); Lost Div. Semifinal series, 2–0 (Rockets Hockey Club); Lost Group B Round-Robin, 3–4 (Minnesota Blue Ox), 1–5 (Florida Eels), 1–7 (Metro Jets Development Program)
2021–22	44	31	11	2	–	64	249	121	2nd of 7, Atlantic East Div. 13th of 64, USPHL Premier	Won Div. Semifinal series, 2–0 (Philadelphia Hockey Club); Lost Div. Final series, 0–2 (Rockets Hockey Club)
2022–23	44	38	5	1	–	77	267	120	1st of 10, Mid Atlantic Div. t–2nd of 70, USPHL Premier	Won Div. Quarterfinal series, 2–0 P.A.L. Jr. Islanders); Lost Div. Semifinal series, 2–0 (Rockets Hockey Club); Lost Seeding game, 2–7 (Metro Jets); Lost Eighthfinal, 3–5 (Charlotte Rush)
Brooklyn Aviators
2023–24	44	1	42	1	0	3	51	372	8th of 8, Atlantic Div. 61st of 61, USPHL Premier	Lost Div. Quarterfinal series, 0–2 (Connecticut Jr. Rangers)
2024–25	44	5	36	2	1	13	107	275	11th of 11, Atlantic Div. t-67th of 73, USPHL Premier	Did not qualify

== Former logos ==
New York Aviators logo
