= Connecticut Jr. Rangers (Tier III) =

- City: Stamford, Connecticut
- League: United States Premier Hockey League Premier
- Division: Atlantic
- Founded: 1989
- Home arena: Chelsea Piers Connecticut
- Colors: Blue, white, and red
- Head coach: Mike Stanaway
- Affiliates: Connecticut Jr. Rangers

Franchise history
- 1989–2014: Connecticut Yankees
- 2014–present: Connecticut Jr. Rangers

The Connecticut Jr. Rangers are a Tier III junior ice hockey team playing in the United States Premier Hockey League's (USPHL) Premier Division. The Jr. Rangers play their home games at Chelsea Piers Connecticut.

== History ==
Connecticut Yankees logo

In 2012, several teams decided to leave the Eastern Junior Hockey League and form their own league. The Connecticut Yankees, who had been in operation as an independent junior club since 1989, joined with the breakaway group and became founding members of the United States Premier Hockey League in 2013. In 2016, the league petitioned USA Hockey to begin sponsoring a separate Tier II league. In December, the USPHL petition was denied. As a result, the USPHL left USA Hockey oversight and began operating their new division independently. The second Connecticut Jr. Rangers team began that fall and both teams remain in operation (as of 2025).

=== USPHL ===
The Connecticut Yankees played their inaugural season in the USPHL 2013–14, finishing last in the field of 9 teams. After reaching a deal with the New York Rangers, they rebranded as the Connecticut Jr. Rangers in 2014. The club had another poor season before making their first postseason appearance in 2015. After 4 years of middling records, the team declined after COVID-19 ended the 2020 postseason prematurely. It took a few years for the club to rebuild but, once they got back on track, they had a rapid ascent and peaked with their first league championship in 2024.

== Season-by-season records ==
Season	GP	W	L	OTL	Pts	GF	GA	Regular season finish	Playoffs
2013–14	48	8	39	1	17	120	237	9th of 9	Did not qualify
2014–15	50	10	32	8	28	123	213	10th of 11	Did not qualify
2015–16	44	20	23	1	41	134	170	7th of 12	Won Round 1, 3–1 vs. Portland Jr. Pirates; Lost Round 2 series, 1–2 vs. Jersey Hitmen
2016–17	45	19	20	6	44	133	142	5th of 10	Lost Quarterfinal series, 1–2 vs. Syracuse Jr. Stars
2017–18	44	15	25	4	34	155	203	7th of 9 Mid-Atlantic Div. t–34th of 44 USPHL	Won Div. Quarterfinal series, 2–0 vs. Skipjacks Hockey Club; Lost Div. Semifinal series, 0–2 vs. New Jersey Rockets
2018–19	44	19	21	4	42	171	203	4th of 7, North East Div. 32nd of 54, USPHL	Won Div. Quarterfinal series, 2–1 vs. Niagara Falls Thunder; Lost Div. Semifinal series, 1–2 vs. Connecticut Nighthawks
2019–20	44	21	21	2	44	175	168	3rd of 6, North East Div. t–32nd of 52, USPHL	Won Div. Quarterfinal series, 2–0 vs. Connecticut Nighthawks; Lost Div. Semifinal series, 0–2 vs. Springfield Pics
2020–21	40	14	25	1	29	124	170	7th of 10, Mid Atlantic Div. 47th of 62, USPHL	Did not qualify
2021–22	44	11	32	1	23	107	191	7th of 7, Atlantic East Div. 57th of 64, USPHL	Did not qualify
2022–23	44	23	17	4	50	172	149	5th of 10, Mid Atlantic Div. t–34th of 70, USPHL	Lost Div. Quarterfinal series, 1–2 Rockets Hockey Club
2023–24	44	41	3	0	82	341	105	1st of 8, Atlantic Div. 1st of 61, USPHL	Won Div. Quarterfinal series, 2–0 vs. Brooklyn Aviators; Won Div. Semifinal series, 2–0 vs. Rockets Hockey Club; Won Eigthfinal, 6–2 vs. Wilkes-Barre/Scranton Knights; Won Quarterfinal, 2–0 vs. Charlotte Rush; Won Semifinal, 5–2 vs. Metro Jets Development Program; Won Championship, 5–4 (OT) vs. Islanders Hockey Club
2024–25	44	31	9	1	66	213	127	1st of 11, Atlantic Div. 14th of 73, USPHL	Lost Div. Quarterfinal series, 0–2 Wilkes-Barre/Scranton Knights
2025–26	43	31	10	2	64	232	142	3rd of 10, Atlantic Div. 20th of 77, USPHL	Won Div. Quarterfinal series, 2-0 Mercer Chiefs; Won Div Semifinals 2-0 (Red Bank Generals); Lost Div, Finals 1-2 (West Chester Wolves)
