= Long Beach Bombers (WSHL) =

- City: Lakewood, California
- League: WSHL
- Founded: 1993
- Folded: 2019
- Home arena: The Rinks - Lakewood Ice
- Colors: Black, white, gray, & blue

Franchise history
- 1993–1996: Anaheim Jr. Ducks
- 1996–2006: Southern California Jr. Bombers
- 2006–2010: Bay City Bombers
- 2010–2019: Long Beach Bombers

The Long Beach Bombers were a junior ice hockey team that last played in the Western States Hockey League. The team played its home games at The Rinks – Lakewood ICE in Lakewood, California.

== History ==
Before moving to Tier III Junior A hockey, the Bombers competed in Junior B hockey from 1994 until 2007 when the team and Western States Hockey League (WSHL) were upgraded to Tier III Jr. A status. In 2011, the league left USA Hockey sanctioning and joined the Amateur Athletic Union and in 2012, the AAU-sanctioned United Hockey Union. In 2015, the Bombers and the WSHL were promoted to Tier II under the AAU sanctioning.

Led by Dr. Don Thorne, the team was a founding member of the WSHL in 1993 as the Anaheim Jr. Ducks and won the first two Thorne Cup Championships of the league's existence. The franchise was then transferred to Ron White, a rink owner and president of the Southern California Bombers youth hockey programs, and the team became the Southern California Jr. Bombers in the 1996 offseason. Like Dr. Thorne before him, White also became commissioner of the WSHL by 1998. The Bombers were also branded as the Bay City Bombers in 2006, and then revised their name once more becoming the Long Beach Bombers in 2010.

In 2019, White sold the Bombers to a new ownership group and was rebranded as the Long Beach Jets. White then used the Bombers' branding to launch a new WSHL team in Barrhead, Alberta. On August 12, the WSHL announced that the Jets ceased operations prior to the 2019–20 season. The Bombers were the last founding franchise of the WSHL still playing in the league.

== Season-by-season records ==
Season	GP	W	L	OTW	OTL	Pts	GF	GA	PIM	Finish	Playoffs
2010–11	46	18	26	—	2	38	156	179	–	6th of 8, Western; 10th of 13, WSHL	Did not qualify
2011–12	46	16	27	—	3	35	157	236	1192	5th of 6, Western; 12th of 16, WSHL	Did not qualify
2012–13	46	19	25	—	2	40	165	228	1129	6th of 6, Western; 15th of 22 WSHL	Did not qualify
2013–14	46	28	18	—	0	56	228	170	1133	4th of 6, Pacific; 11th of 24, WSHL	Lost Div. Semifinals, 0–2 vs. Fresno Monsters
2014–15	46	33	13	—	0	66	215	140	1044	3rd of 8, Western; 9th of 28, WSHL	Lost Div. Quarterfinals, 1–2 vs. San Diego Gulls
2015–16	52	39	10	—	3	81	247	135	1333	2nd of 8, Western; 5th of 29, WSHL	Div. Quarterfinals bye Won Div. Semifinals, 2–0 vs. Fresno Monsters; Won Div. Finals, 2–0 vs. Valencia Flyers; Lost Thorne Cup Semifinals, 0–2 vs. Idaho Jr. Steelheads
2016–17	52	46	5	—	1	93	365	115	871	1st of 8, Western; 1st of 27, WSHL	Div. Quarterfinals bye Won Div. Semifinals, 2–0 vs. Las Vegas Storm; Won Div. Finals, 2–0 vs. Valencia Flyers; 1–2–0, 5th of 6, Thorne Cup round-robin (L, 3–6 vs. Jr. Thunder; L, 0–6 vs. Mustangs; OTW, 3–2 vs. Flyers)
2017–18	51	36	11	—	4	76	263	158	702	1st of 6, Western; 6th of 23, WSHL	Div. Quarterfinals bye Won Div. Semifinals, 2–1 vs. Phoenix Knights; Won Div. Finals, 2–0 vs. Fresno Monsters; 1–2–0, 4th of 6, Thorne Cup round-robin (W, 4–1 vs. Rhinos; L, 2–4 vs. Mustangs; L, 1–5 vs. IceCats); Lost Thorne Cup Semifinal game, 3–10 vs. Ogden Mustangs
2018–19	51	35	8	6	2	119 (Note: Beginning with the 2018–19 season, the WSHL began awarding 3pts for a win, 2pts for an overtime win, and 1pt for an overtime loss.)	262	137	653	1st of 5, Western; 4th of 23, WSHL	Won Div. Semifinals, 2–0 vs. Ontario Avalanche; Won Div. Finals, 2–1 vs. Fresno Monsters; 0–3–0–0, 5th of 6, Thorne Cup round-robin (L, 1–6 vs. Aeros; L, 2–4 vs. Rhinos; L, 1–6 vs. Jr. Blazers)

=== Alumni ===
The Bombers have had a number of alumni move on to higher levels of junior, college, and professional ice hockey.
