= Bakersfield Jr. Condors =

- City: Bakersfield, California
- League: Western States Hockey League
- Division: Northestern
- Founded: 2009
- Home arena: Bakersfield Ice Sports Center
- Colors: Black, Red, beige

Franchise history
- 2009–2011: Bakersfield Jr. Condors
- 2011–present: Ogden Mustangs

The Bakersfield Jr. Condors were a junior Junior A Tier III ice hockey team based out of Bakersfield, California.

== History ==
The Bakersfield Jr. Condors were a USA Hockey-sanctioned Junior A Tier III ice hockey team based out of Bakersfield, California. Their host facility was the Bakersfield Ice Sports Center. The Jr. Condors were members of the Western States Hockey League and played in the Western Division of the WSHL. The team joined the WSHL as an expansion team for the 2009–10 season along with the Fresno Monsters, Arizona RedHawks, and Idaho Jr. Steelheads. The team would be moved to Ogden, Utah as the Mustangs in 2011.

== Season-by-season records ==
Season	GP	W	L	OTL	Pts	GF	GA	PIM	Finish	Playoffs
2009–10	49	10	37	2	22	106	284	1444	7th of 8, Western	Did not qualify
2010–11	46	9	33	4	22	105	253		8th of 8, Western	Did not qualify
