= Idaho Jr. Steelheads =

Jr. Steelheads
- City: Boise, Idaho
- Founded: 2009
- Home arena: Manchester Ice & Event Centre; Idaho Ice World; CenturyLink Arena
- Colors: Blue, black, white, silver
- Owner: Boise Youth Amateur Hockey Association (BYAHA)

Franchise history
- 2009–present: Jr. Steelheads

Championships
- Playoff championships: 5 Thorne Cups (2010–11, 2011–12, 2012–13, 2014–15, 2015–16); 1 UHU National Championships (2013)

The Jr. Steelheads is an ice hockey team based in Boise, Idaho. The team played in the Western States Hockey League (WSHL) and home games were held at Manchester Ice & Event Centre in McCall. The team previously played some home games at Idaho Ice World and CenturyLink Arena in Boise, the latter being the home of the ECHL Idaho Steelheads. The team had been one of the most successful in the WSHL, winning five Thorne Cup championships over six seasons and appeared in seven straight between 2010 and 2017.

== History ==
IceCats logo

The Junior Steelheads were founded by Idaho Hockey Foundation Inc. in 2009 as a 501(c)(3) non-profit entity. The Junior Steelheads, like their ECHL parent club the Idaho Steelheads, were named for a species of seagoing rainbow trout native to Idaho streams and rivers and popular with local anglers. The team was coached by former NHL Colorado Rockies draft pick and former Idaho Steelheads' head coach John Olver.

In the team's first season, the 2009–10 WSHL season, the Junior Steelheads finished second in the Western Division and clinched their first Thorne Cup playoff spot against the experienced Phoenix Polar Bears. The Junior Steelheads won the first game of the three-game series 5–3, but Phoenix rallied winning the second game 3–2 in OT and the third game 2–1. During the season, the team received a four-day ban from the city of Boise after an incident at a practice when players missed a shot, they had to take off an article of equipment. An assistant coach told the AP the team was emulating a similar stunt done by the Tampa Bay Lightning.

On April 9, 2013, the Junior Steelheads defeated the Bay Area Seals 5–1 to win the first ever United Hockey Union junior ice hockey championship in a six-team tournament in Las Vegas, Nevada. Olver would leave the Jr. Steelheads to coach in the ECHL again with the Bakersfield Condors for the 2013–14 season and assistant Kyle Grabowski took over as head coach. Olver returned to the Jr. Steelheads after one season.

In 2017, the team changed its name to the Idaho IceCats after the ECHL Steelheads asked the organization to change their name to prevent confusion. The new logo is based on that of another previously Olver-coached team, the Tacoma Sabercats. After the 2017–18 season, Olver stepped down again, leading to the IceCats ceasing operations.

== Season-by-season records ==
Season	GP	W	L	OTL	PTS	GF	GA	PIM	Finish	Playoffs
2009–10	49	39	7	3	81	238	111	1168	2nd of 8, Western; 3rd of 13, WSHL	Lost Div. Semifinals, 1–2 vs. Phoenix Polar Bears
2010–11	46	39	5	2	80	257	84	—	1st of 8, Western; 1st of 13, WSHL	Won Conf. Semifinals, 2–0 vs. San Diego Gulls; Won Conf. Finals, 2–0 vs. Phoenix Polar Bears; Won League Finals, 2–0 vs. El Paso Rhinos; Thorne Cup Champions
2011–12	46	42	2	2	88	264	92	911	1st of 5, Mountain; 2nd of 13, WSHL	Won Div. Semifinals, 2–0 vs. Ogden Mustangs; Won Div. Finals, 2–1 vs. Boulder Bison; 3–0 in Thorne Cup round-robin (W, 3–1 vs. Monsters; W, 9–6 vs. Rhinos; W, 3–2 vs. Ice Jets); Won Championship game, 6–5 vs. Dallas Ice Jets; Thorne Cup Champions
2012–13	46	44	1	1	89	256	100	1142	1st of 5, Northwest; 1st of 22, WSHL	Won Div Semifinals, 2–0 vs. Seattle Totems; Won Div. Finals, 2–0 vs. Southern Oregon Spartans; 2–0 in Thorne Cup round-robin (W, 4–3 vs. Monsters; W, 10–1 vs. Spartans); Won Semifinal game, 3–1 vs. Southern Oregon Spartans; Won Championship game, 4–2 vs. Bay Area Seals; Thorne Cup Champions
2013–14	46	39	5	2	80	218	93	1227	1st of 6, Northwest; 2nd of 24, WSHL	Won Div. Semifinals, 2–1 vs. Missoula Maulers; Lost Div. Finals, 0–2 vs. Ogden Mustangs; 1–2 in Thorne Cup round-robin (as wild card) (L, 2–4 vs. Rhinos; OTL, 3–4 vs. Monsters; W, 7–2 vs. Mustangs); Won Semifinal game, 3–2 vs. Fresno Monsters; Lost Championship game, 3–7 vs. El Paso Rhinos
2014–15	46	42	2	2	86	290	74	822	1st of 7, Northwest; 1st of 28, WSHL	Won Div. Semifinals, 2–0 vs. Whitefish Wolverines; Won Div. Finals, 2–1 vs. Missoula Maulers; Won Thorne Cup Semifinals, 2–0 vs. Fresno Monsters; Won Thorne Cup Finals, 3–1 vs. El Paso Rhinos; Thorne Cup Champions
2015–16	52	44	7	1	89	334	78	818	1st of 8, Northwest; 2nd of 29, WSHL	Div. Quarterfinals, Bye; Won Div. Semifinals, 2–0 vs. Whitefish Wolverines; Won Div. Finals, 2–0 vs. Missoula Maulers; Won Thorne Cup Semifinals, 2–0 vs. Long Beach Bombers; Won Thorne Cup Finals, 3–0 vs. Colorado Jr. Eagles; Thorne Cup Champions
2016–17	52	43	5	4	90	273	99	910	1st of 7, Northwest; 2nd of 27, WSHL	Div. Quarterfinals, Bye; Won Div. Semifinals, 2–0 vs. Tahoe Icemen; Won Div. Finals, 2–0 vs. Butte Cobras; 1–2–0, 4th of 6, Thorne Cup round-robin (L, 2–3 vs. Mustangs; W, 3–1 vs. Flyers; L, 1–2 vs.Jr. Thunder); Won Thorne Cup Semifinal game, 3–1 vs. Valencia Flyers; Lost Thorne Cup Championship game, 3–4 vs. Wichita Jr. Thunder
Idaho IceCats
2017–18	51	44	4	3	91	306	103	965	1st of 6, Northwest; 2nd of 23, WSHL	Div. Quarterfinals, Bye; Won Div. Semifinals, 2–0 vs. West Sound Warriors; Won Div. Finals, 2–0 vs. Tahoe Icemen; 2–1–0, 2nd of 6, Thorne Cup round-robin (W, 4–2 vs. Jr. Blazers; L, 1–4 vs. Outliers; W, 5–1 vs. Bombers); Lost Thorne Cup Semifinal game, 0–4 vs. El Paso Rhinos

== United Hockey Union National Championship Tournament ==
AAU Sanctioned Junior A National Championship
In 2013 and 2014, the Midwest Junior Hockey League (MWJHL), Northern States Hockey League (NSHL), and the Western States Hockey League (WSHL) advanced two teams each to the tournament.
There was no UHU tournament held after the 2015 season.

Year	Round Robin	Record Ranking	Semifinal Game	Championship Game
2013	W, Tennyson Chevrolet (MWJHL) 4–3; W, Lake George Fighting Spirit (NSHL) 3–0; W, Hartland Hounds (MWJHL) 5–1	3–0–0; 1st of 6	W, Hartland Hounds (MWJHL) 6–2	W, Bay Area Seals (WSHL) 5–1; National champions
2014	W, Hartland Hounds (MWJHL) 3–0; SOW, El Paso Rhinos (WSHL) 3–2; OTL, AHI Fighting Spirit (NSHL) 5–6	2–0–1; 1st of 6	W, AHI Fighting Spirit (NSHL) 6–1	L, El Paso Rhinos (WSHL) 3–6
