= Mickey Lang =

American ice hockey player

- Born: August 13, 1986 (age 39) Reno, Nevada, U.S.
- Height: 5 ft 10 in (178 cm)
- Weight: 174 lb (79 kg; 12 st 6 lb)
- Position: Center
- Shot: Right
- Played for: Rockford IceHogs; Iowa Wild
- NHL draft: Undrafted
- Playing career: 2011–2015

Mickey Lang (born August 13, 1986) is an American former professional ice hockey player. He has also been a junior ice hockey head coach since retiring as a player.

Undrafted out of Manhattanville College, on January 27, 2013, Lang was released from his tryout contract with the Rockford IceHogs of the American Hockey League, and returned to the Quad City Mallards to finish the 2012–13 CHL season where he was rewarded for his outstanding play by being named to the 2012–13 All-CHL Team.

On July 9, 2013, Lang was signed to a one-year deal as a free agent with the Fort Wayne Komets of the ECHL. On December 28, 2013, Lang was traded by the Komets to the Orlando Solar Bears in exchange for David Rutherford. Lang blossomed with the Solar Bears in the 2013–14 season, finishing with 51 points in just 37 games, to earn a selection to the ECHL First All-Star Team and ECHL MVP honors.

On July 21, 2014, Lang was rewarded for his productive season, earning a one-year AHL contract with the Toronto Marlies. However, he was sent back to their ECHL affiliate in Orlando and never played a game for the Marlies.

In June 2016, he accepted the head coaching position with the Tahoe Icemen, a team in the Tier II junior United Hockey Union-sanctioned Western States Hockey League.

In March 2019, the New York Apple Core in the junior level Eastern Hockey League announced Mickey Lang as the head coach for the 2019–20 season, but was replaced at some point during the season by former Shenzhen KRS Vanke Rays head coach, Mike LaZazzera.

== Awards and honors ==
Honors	Year
All-CHL Team (First Team All-Star)	2012–13
All-ECHL First Team	2013–14
ECHL MVP	2013–14
