= El Paso Rhinos =

- City: El Paso, Texas
- League: North American 3 Hockey League
- Division: South
- Founded: 2006
- Home arena: County Events Center
- Colors: Orange, black, gray, white
- Owner: Cory Herman
- President: Corey Heon
- Head coach: Eddie Fritz (Interim)
- Affiliates: El Paso Rhinos (NAHL)
- Website: http://www.elpasorhinosna3.com

Franchise history
- 2006–2026: El Paso Rhinos

Championships
- Division titles: WSHL 2006–07, 2007–08, 2008–09, 2010–11, 2011–12, 2012–13, 2013–14, 2014–15, 2017–18, 2018–19 NA3HL 2021-22
- Playoff championships: Thorne Cup: (2008, 2014, 2018, 2019); UHU National Champions: (2014); USA Hockey Tier III Jr Nationals (2011 Silver Medalist)

The El Paso Rhinos are a junior ice hockey organization based in El Paso, Texas. Their home games are played at the County Events Center located within the El Paso County Coliseum complex. The Rhinos are members of the Tier III junior North American 3 Hockey League (NA3HL) and was previously a member of the Western States Hockey League from 2006 to 2020. The organization also has a Tier II team that was founded in 2021 and plays in the North American Hockey League.

== History ==
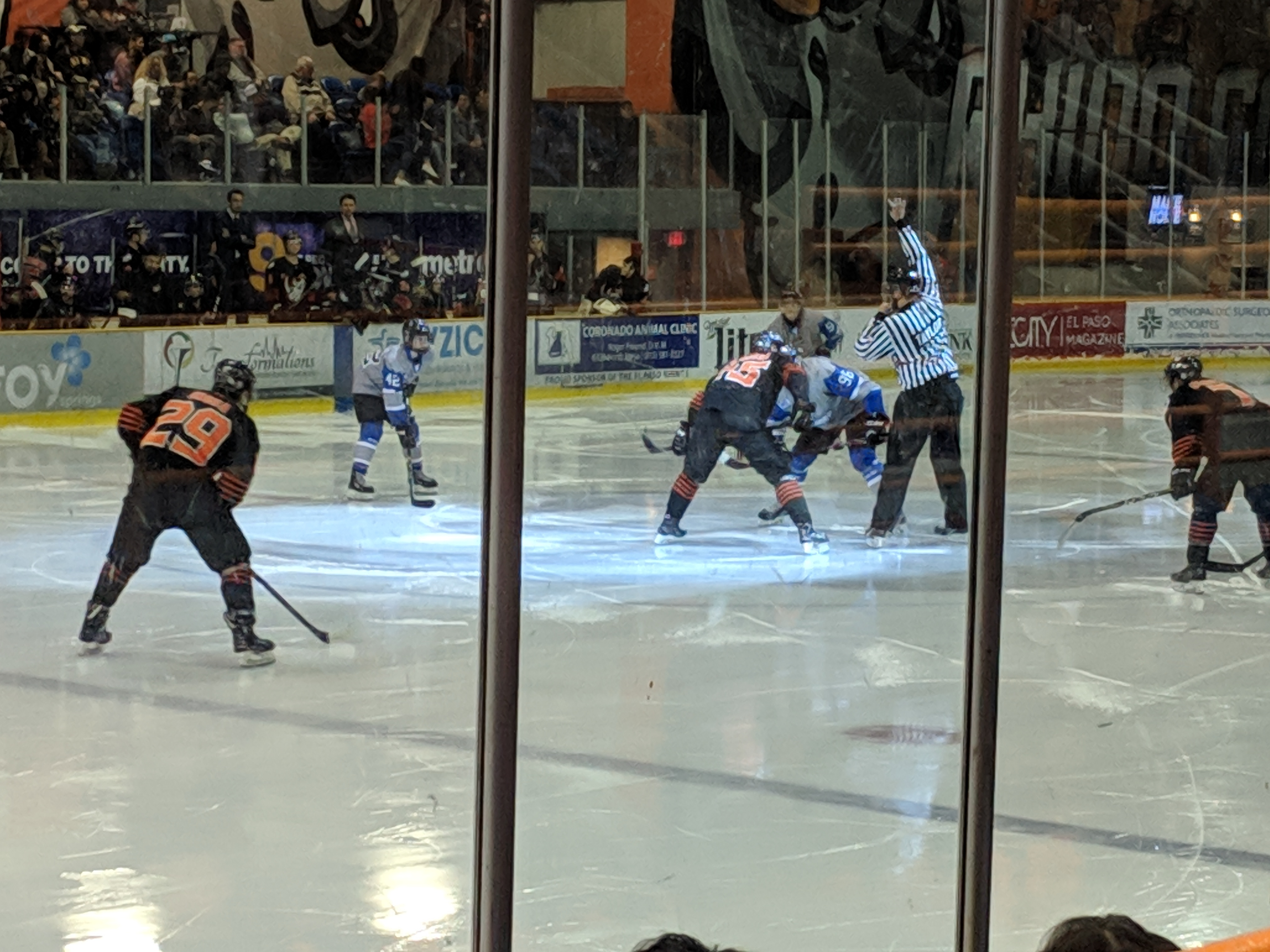
El Paso Rhinos vs Wichita Jr. Thunder with referee. March 8, 2019.

In 2006, retired former El Paso Buzzards professional hockey player Cory Herman founded the El Paso Rhinos. The Buzzards had ceased operations in 2003 and Herman wanted to bring ice hockey back to the city of El Paso. The franchise's first season in the WSHL (a USA Hockey sanctioned Tier III Junior B league) was successful and they made it to the 2007 Thorne Cup championship. They lost to the Phoenix Polar Bears but by placing second in the playoffs they qualified for the Tier III Junior B National Championship Tournament. After the conclusion of the 2006–07 season, Commissioner Ron White announced the approval of Tier III Junior A status for the WSHL.

In the 2007–08 season, the Rhino's finished first in the overall standings with only 1 loss in regulation. Rhinos player Marcus Wilhite turned in a 46-goal, 109 point season to lead the Mid-West Division of the WSHL in scoring. El Paso's early success attracted higher-level talent and the team acquired players like Anthony Paulsen, who led his previous league in scoring among all defenseman, scoring 6 goals and 18 assists in 38 MJHL games. The Rhinos faced off against the Phoenix Polar Bears in the WSHL championship after sweeping the Tulsa Rampage for the Mid-West Division Champion title. The Rhinos defeated the Polar Bears and won the 2008 Thorne Cup before moving on to their first Tier III Junior A Nationals as the WSHL champion.

The Rhinos won 11 straight games to start the 2008–09 season before losing 5–6 to the Tulsa Rampage. El Paso became the Mid-West Division champions for the third time in three years, beating the San Antonio Diablos, by scores of 6-3 and 9–3, to sweep the Diablos in the Mid-West Division Finals. However, the Rhinos would lose the 2009 Thorne Cup championship by being swept by the Phoenix Polar Bears. By being the runner-up in the Thorne Cup Finals, the Rhinos would represent the WSHL at the Tier III Junior A Hockey Nationals for a second time in Marlboro, Massachusetts along with the Polar Bears. During the 2008–09 season, the El Paso Rhinos would adopt Tatenda, an actual rhino in Africa, as a mascot. Though the rhino was not physically moved to America, the organization continues to donate to the organization to cover Tatenda's food and upkeep expenses.

The 2009–10 season was another successful year with the Rhinos finishing first in the Mid-West and tied for first in the WSHL in the regular season. However, the team would lose in the playoffs to the Boulder Bison and not qualify for the national tournament. In June 2010, the franchise opened the El Paso Rhinos Training Center, a hockey specific gym that contains state of the art equipment. The new training facility led to numerous players signing with the Rhinos for the 2010–11 season.

The 2010–11 season led to another first place regular season finish in the Mid-West and Mid-West Conference Playoff Championship win over the Boulder Bison. The Rhinos would lose the 2011 Thorne Cup championship to the Idaho Jr. Steelheads without winning a game. The Rhinos would again represent the WSHL in the national tournament in Minnesota. The Rhinos’ first game ended in a tie with the Granite City Lumberjacks, the second was a win over the Northern Cyclones, and the third game was a win over the Chicago Hitmen. El Paso's 2-0-1 record earned a spot in the Tier III Junior A Finals round. Goaltender Trent Casper led the Rhinos to a 2–1 win over the Idaho Jr. Steelheads in the semifinal before losing to the Helena Bighorns in the national championship game.

Prior to the 2011–12 season the WSHL would join the United Hockey Union (UHU) and become sanctioned by the Amateur Athletic Union (AAU) instead of USA Hockey leading to some teams leaving the league and the addition of others. The 2011–12 season was another regular season first-place finish in the Midwest Conference and a Midwest Conference Playoff Championship. The Rhinos defeated the New Mexico Renegades 2 games to 1 in the division semifinals and defeated the Dallas Ice Jets 2 games to 1. With three conferences in the WSHL for this season, the playoff winners and runners-up moved on to the Thorne Cup championship for a 2-game round robin style series held in the Rhinos' home arena in El Paso. The Rhinos lost to the Idaho Jr. Steelheads before defeating the Fresno Monsters to for an 1-1-0 record. The Dallas Ice Jets and Idaho Jr. Steelheads would both finish the round robin with two wins leaving the Rhinos out of the championship game.

For 2012–13 season, El Paso was moved to the Mountain Conference for one season after an influx of midwestern teams. Regardless of new opponents, the Rhinos still finished the regular season in first place in the conference. The Rhinos would run through the Mountain Conference Playoffs without losing a game to the Phoenix Knights and the Boulder Bison. In the Thorne Cup championship round robin, the Rhinos would defeat the Bay Area Seals 6-3 and the Fresno Monsters 8–3. However, the Rhinos would lose the semifinal game to the Seals by a score of 7–2. By the end of the 2012–13 season, the Rhinos had broken franchise attendance records for most sold-out crowds in one season, largest crowd in a season, and overall total attendance for the year.

In 2013–14, the Rhinos earned a 44-2-0 record, good for another first place regular season finish, now in the Midwest Division, and first in points in the WSHL. The Rhinos would win their second Thorne Cup championship and post an undefeated playoff record of 9-0-0 defeating the Idaho Jr. Steelheads (4-2 in game 1 of the round robin and 7–3 in the Thorne Cup championship game), the Phoenix Knights (5-3 in game 2 of the round robin and 4–3 in the Thorne Cup Semifinals), the Texas Jr. Brahmas (2 games to 1 in Conference Finals and 9–3 in game 3 of the round robin), and the Dallas Snipers (2 games to 1 in Conference Semifinals). Goalie Bryce Fink would be named Thorne Cup MVP after earning six of the wins.

After the Thorne Cup championship, the Rhinos traveled to Las Vegas, Nevada to represent the WSHL in the second UHU National Championship tournament. In the first game, the Rhinos would defeat the Jersey Shore Wildcats of the Northern States Hockey League by a score of 3–1. In the second game, the Rhinos once again faced the Steelheads and took the game to overtime before losing in the shootout for a final score of 2–3. The Rhinos would defeat the Soo Firehawks of the Midwest Junior Hockey League by a score of 8–3 in game three of the round robin. The Rhinos' record of 2-0-1 qualified them for the semifinals where they once again defeated the Firehawks by a score or 12-2 leading to a Thorne Cup championship rematch with the Steelheads. The Rhinos met the Steelheads for the third time in three weeks coming away with a 6–3 win for El Paso and their first national championship Title. Similar to the Thorne Cup championship, Bryce Fink would also be named tournament MVP.

The 2020 Thorne Cup playoffs were cancelled due to the COVID-19 pandemic and the WSHL later announced it would go dormant for the 2020–21 season due to the effects of the pandemic in May 2020. On June 16, 2020, the Rhinos announced it would join the South Division of the North American 3 Hockey League (NA3HL), effective for the 2020–21 season. Beginning the 2021–22 season, the Rhinos plan on joining the South Division in the North American Hockey League (NAHL). After leaving the WSHL, the city of El Paso and the Rhinos won the Kraft Hockeyville USA competition, which awards the city's arena $150,000 in upgrades.

For the 2021–22 season, Herman remained the head coach with the Tier II Rhinos while the organization hired Nick Mammel as the head coach of the Tier III NA3HL Rhinos. After 15 years as head coach of the Rhinos, Cory Herman stepped down to focus on team operations and hired Anthony Bohn as head coach of the NAHL team.

== Season-by-season records ==
Season	GP	W	L	OTW	OTL	PTS	GF	GA	PIM	Finish	Playoffs
Western States Hockey League (WSHL)
2006–07	47	40	6	—	1	81	312	146	1516	1st of 5, Mid-West; 2nd of 13, WSHL	Won Div. Semifinals, 2–0 vs. San Antonio Diablos; Won Div. Finals, 2–0 vs. Tulsa Rampage; Lost Thorne Cup championship, 0–2 vs. Phoenix Polar Bears
2007–08	51	48	1	—	2	98	350	112	1164	1st of 6, Mid-West; 1st of 11, WSHL	Won Div. Semifinals, 2–0 vs. Colorado Outlaws; Won Div. Finals, 2–0 vs. Tulsa Rampage; Won Thorne Cup championship, 2–0 vs. Phoenix Polar Bears
2008–09	49	45	3	—	1	91	320	89	1109	1st of 6, Mid-West; 1st of 11, WSHL	Won Div. Semifinals, 2–0 vs. Colorado Outlaws; Won Div. Finals, 2–0 vs. San Antonio Diablos; Lost Thorne Cup championship, 0–2 vs. Phoenix Polar Bears
2009–10	52	47	5	—	0	94	313	92	1140	1st of 5, Mid-West; 1st of 13, WSHL	Won Div. Semifinals, 2–0 vs. San Antonio Diablos; Lost Div. Finals, 1–2 vs. Boulder Bison
2010–11	46	33	11	—	2	68	243	137	–	1st of 5, Mid-West; 3rd of 13, WSHL	Won Conf. Semifinals, 2–0 vs. Tulsa Rampage; Won Conf. Finals, 2–0 vs. Boulder Bison; Lost Thone Cup Finals, 0–2 vs. Idaho Jr. Steelheads
2011–12	46	35	9	—	2	72	274	134	1034	1st of 5, Midwest; 3rd of 13, WSHL	Won Conf. Semifinals, 2–1 vs. New Mexico Renegades; Won Conf. Finals, 2–0 vs. Dallas Ice Jets; 1–2–0 in Thorne Cup round-robin (1–2 vs. Ice Jets; 6–9 vs. Jr. Steelheads; 3–2 vs. Monsters)
2012–13	46	36	8	—	2	74	290	119	1428	1st of 6, Mountain; 3rd of 22, WSHL	Won Conf. Semifinals, 2–0 vs. Phoenix Knights; Won Conf. Finals, 2–0 vs. Boulder Bison; 2–0–0 in Thorne Cup round-robin (6–3 vs. Seals; 8–3 vs. Monsters); Lost Thorne Cup Semifinal game, 2–7 vs. Bay Area Seals
2013–14	46	44	2	—	0	88	374	83	1305	1st of 6, Midwest; 1st of 24, WSHL	Won Conf. Semifinals, 2–0 vs. Dallas Snipers; Won Conf. Finals, 2–0 vs. Texas Jr. Brahmas; 3–0–0 in Thorne Cup round-robin (4–2 vs. Jr. Steelheads; 5–3 vs. Knights; 9–3 vs. Jr. Brahmas); Won Thorne Cup Semifinal game, 4–3 vs. Phoenix Knights; Won Thorne Cup championship Game, 7–3 vs. Idaho Jr. Steelheads
2014–15	46	41	5	—	0	82	279	95	1219	1st of 6, Midwest; 2nd of 28, WSHL	Won Div. Semifinals, 2–0 vs. Dallas Snipers; Won Div. Finals, 2–1 vs. Oklahoma City Blazers; Won Conf. Finals, 2–0 vs. Ogden Mustangs; Lost Thorne Cup championship series, 1–3 vs. Idaho Jr. Steelheads
2015–16	52	27	23	—	2	56	208	192	1012	4th of 6, Midwest; 15th of 29, WSHL	Won Div. Quarterfinals, 2–0 vs. Tulsa Jr. Oilers; Lost Div. Semifinals, 0–2 vs. Oklahoma City Blazers
2016–17	52	38	12	—	2	78	322	134	1315	1st of 6, Midwest; 6th of 27, WSHL	Div. Quarterfinals bye Won Div. Semifinals, 2–1 vs. Springfield Express; Lost Div. Finals, 0–2 vs. Wichita Jr. Thunder
2017–18	51	49	1	—	1	99	405	63	1108	1st of 6, Midwest; 1st of 23, WSHL	Won Div. Semifinals, 2–0 vs. Dallas Snipers; Won Div. Finals, 2–0 vs. Oklahoma City Jr. Blazers; 1–2–0, 3rd of 6, Thorne Cup round-robin (L, 1–4 vs. Bombers; L, 3–4 vs. Jr. Blazers; W, 4–3 vs. Outliers); Won Thorne Cup Semifinal game, 4–0 vs. Idaho IceCats; Won Thorne Cup championship game, 3–2 vs. Ogden Mustangs
2018–19	51	37	8	3	3	120 (Note: Beginning with the 2018–19 season, the WSHL awarded 3pts for a win, 2pts for an overtime win, and 1pt for an overtime loss.)	284	101	1259	1st of 5, Midwest; 3rd of 23, WSHL	Won Div. Semifinals, 2–0 vs. Dallas Snipers; Won Div. Finals, 2–0 vs. Oklahoma City Jr. Blazers; 2–0–1–0, 1st of 6, Thorne Cup round-robin (W, 6–0 vs. B. Blazers; W, 4–2 vs. Bombers; OTW, 3–2 vs. Mustangs); Won Thorne Cup Semifinal game, 7–2 vs. Oklahoma City Jr. Blazers; Won Thorne Cup championship game, 2–0 vs. Ogden Mustangs
2019–20	51	43	4	2	2	135	294	80	1131	1st of 6, Midwest; 3rd of 20, WSHL	Playoffs cancelled
North American 3 Hockey League (NA3HL)
2020–21	40	28	6	—	6	62	193	102	1136	3rd of 7, South; 6th of 31, NA3HL	Lost Div. Semifinals, 0–2 vs. Oklahoma City Jr. Blazers
2021–22	47	33	13	—	1	67	288	140	831	3rd of 8, South; 9th of 34, NA3HL	Won Div. Semifinals, 2-1 vs. Oklahoma City Jr. Blazers; Won Div Finals, 2–0 vs. Texas Roadrunners; 0–2–0, Fraser Cup round-robin Pool B (L, 0–5 vs. Lumberjacks; L, 0–4 vs. Bighorns)
2022–23	47	21	21	—	5	47	134	149	998	6th of 8, South; 21st of 34, NA3HL	Did not qualify
2023–24	47	32	13	1	1	66	194	103	793	2nd of 8, South; 9th of 34, NA3HL	Lost Div. Semifinals, 0-2 vs. Drillers
2024–25	47	15	29	2	1	33	116	195	1123	6th of 8, South; 30th of 35, NA3HL	Did not qualify
2025–26	44	27	13	4	0	58	201	121	754	4th of 6, South; 13th of 38, NA3HL	Lost Div. Semifinals, 1-2 vs. Ice Bats

=== Tier III Junior B National Championship Tournament ===
In the 2006–07 season, the Rhinos and the WSHL were sanctioned as Tier III Junior B by USA Hockey. Tier III Junior B included teams from the Central States Hockey League (CSHL), Empire Junior Hockey League (EmJHL), Metropolitan Junior Hockey League (MetJHL), Minnesota Junior Hockey League (MnJHL), and the Northern Pacific Hockey League (NorPac). The top two teams from each Junior B league advanced to the National Championship tournament separated into three divisions consisting of four teams each to play in a round robin style. The four teams with best overall records after round robin play would move on to the finals.

Year	Round Robin	Record Ranking	Semi-final Game	Championship Game
2007	L, St. Louis Jr. Blues (CSHL) 2–4; W, Boston Junior Bruins (EmJHL) 6–2; L, Suffolk PAL (MetJHL) 2–6	1–2–0; 3rd of 4	did not qualify	did not qualify

=== Tier III Junior A National Championship Tournament ===
Starting in 2007–08 season, the Rhinos and the WSHL were sanctioned as Tier III Junior A by USA Hockey. Tier III Junior A included the Atlantic Junior Hockey League (AtJHL), Central States Hockey League (CSHL/NA3HL), Eastern Junior Hockey League (EJHL), Minnesota Junior Hockey League (MnJHL), and the Northern Pacific Hockey League (NorPac). The top two teams from each Junior A league advanced to the National Championship tournament separated into three divisions consisting of four teams each to play in a round robin style. The four teams with best overall records after round robin play would move on to the finals.

Year	Round Robin	Record Ranking	Semi-final Game	Championship Game
2008	L, New Hampshire Junior Monarchs (EJHL) 4–11; W, Minnesota Owls (MnJHL) 5–4; W, Dubuque Thunderbirds (CSHL) 3–1	2–1–0; 2nd of 4	did not qualify	did not qualify
2009	L, New Hampshire Junior Monarchs (EJHL) 2–7; L, Helena Bighorns (NorPac) 3–4; T, New York Bobcats (AtJHL) 2–2	0–2–1; 3rd of 4	did not qualify	did not qualify
2011	T, Granite City Lumberjacks (MnJHL) 4–4; W, Northern Cyclones (AtJHL) 6–5; W, Chicago Hitmen (NA3HL) 7–1	2–0–1; 1st of 4	W, Idaho Jr. Steelheads (WSHL) 2–1	L, Helena Bighorns (NorPac) 1–5

=== United Hockey Union National Championship Tournament ===
AAU Sanctioned Junior A National Championship
In 2013 and 2014, the MWJHL, NSHL, and WSHL advanced two teams each to the tournament.

Year	Round Robin	Record Ranking	Semi-final Game	Championship Game
2014	W, Jersey Shore Wildcats (NSHL) 3–1; SOL, Idaho Jr. Steelheads (WSHL) 2–3; W, Soo Firehawks (MWJHL) 8–3	2–0–1; 3rd of 6	W, Soo Firehawks (MWJHL) 12–2	W, Idaho Jr. Steelheads (WSHL) 6–3; National champions

== Notable players ==
- Ádám Vay (2013–2015) – A goaltender from Budapest, Hungary, played with the Rhinos for two seasons. In 2016, he played for Hungary at the 2016 IIHF World Championship and although his team took last in Group B and 15th of 16 overall, he would be signed by the Minnesota Wild to a two-year, entry-level contract. He became one of a very few WSHL players to ever sign any kind of NHL contract.

== Community outreach ==
The Rhinos frequently wear specialized jerseys on the ice and auction them off to help raise funds for charitable causes including: Susan G. Komen Breast Cancer Foundation, Special Olympics, and local youth hockey. The Rhinos also receive strong mutual support from the U.S. military stationed at nearby Fort Bliss, hosting military appreciation nights with free admission for military personnel and their families. The Rhinos also host adoption days with the Humane Society of El Paso and the Animal Rescue League of El Paso.

=== Tatenda ===
Coach Herman was approached by Karrie Kern, the CEO of the U.S. branch of the Zimbabwe Conservation Task Force, after seeing the team's bus in San Antonio, Texas. During their conversation, she told him about an orphaned rhinoceros in Zimbabwe named Tatenda and jokingly suggested the team adopt her as their mascot. The Rhinos organization thought this was a great idea and adopted Tatenda in November 2008.
