= Texas Renegades =

Texas Renegades may refer to:

- Texas Renegades (film), 1940 film
- Texas Renegades (ice hockey), American ice hockey team
