= Bakersfield Ice Sports Center =

Indoor ice rink in California, U.S.

Valley Children's Ice Center of Bakersfield
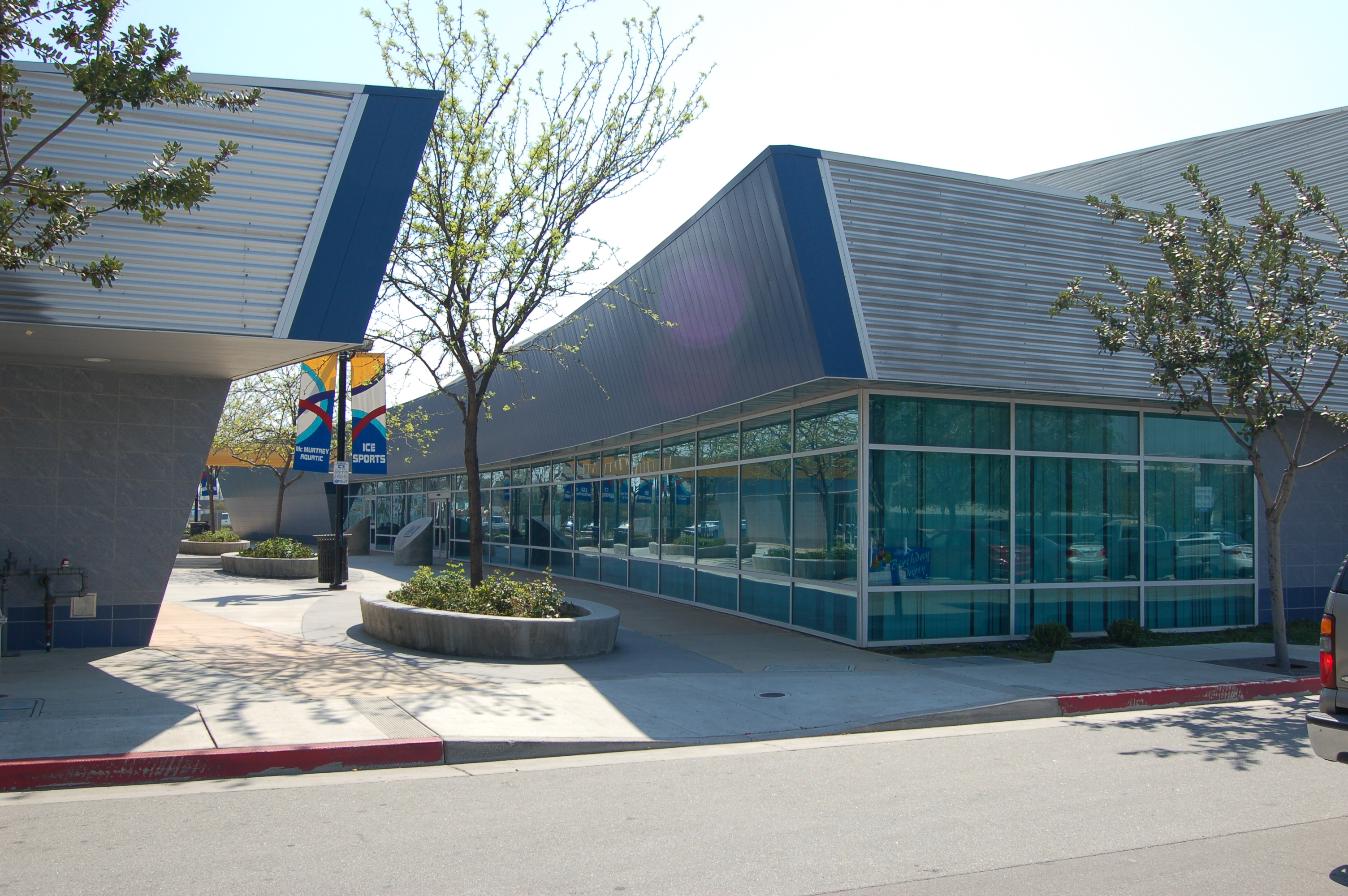
- Entrance to Valley Children's Ice Center
- Interactive map of Valley Children's Ice Center of Bakersfield
- Former names: Bakersfield Ice Sports Center (2003-2018)
- Location: 1325 Q Street, Suite 100; Bakersfield, California
- Coordinates: 35.370°N 119.013°W
- Owner: City of Bakersfield
- Operator: ASM Global
- Capacity: 500
- Surface: Ice

Construction
- Opened: 2003
- Architect: Rossetti architects
- Builder: S.C. Anderson, Inc.

Tenants
- Bakersfield Condors Practice Facility (WCHL/ECHL) (2003–2015); Bakersfield Condors Practice Facility (AHL) (2015–present); Bakersfield Dragons (SCAHA) (2003-2016); Bakersfield Jr. Condors (WSHL) (2009-2011); Bakersfield Jr. Condors (SCAHA) (2016-present); Kern County Knights (LAKHSHL) (2015-present); Cal State Bakersfield Roadrunners (ACHA) (2018-2022); Bakersfield Roughnecks (USPHL) (2022-2025); Bakersfield Oilers (ASHA) (2018-present)

Website
- www.bakersfieldicesports.com

The Valley Children's Ice Center of Bakersfield is a year-round, indoor ice rink in Bakersfield, California. The facility was completed in 2003. It contains a regulation size ice hockey rink, and seating for 500. It also contains locker rooms, and a snack bar. It is used for adult, youth, high school, college, and even special needs hockey, ice skating lessons, and open skating. It is the primary home arena to the Bakersfield Jr. Condors formerly the Bakersfield Dragons, Kern County Knights, Bakersfield Roughnecks of the USPHL, and Bakersfield Oilers ASHA team. The Cal State Bakersfield Roadrunners club hockey team used the facility for practices as well as their secondary home until 2022 when the club was dropped. They played their home games there when Mechanics Bank Arena is hosting other events. The Bakersfield Condors also used the facility for preseason training and occasional practices until 2016 when they moved their preseason training to Dignity Health Arena but still occasionally practice there when Dignity Health Arena is hosting other events. In 2018 Valley Children's Healthcare bought the naming rights to the venue for 10 years until 2028.

== See also ==
- Bakersfield Condors (1998–2015)
