= AZ Ice Gilbert =

Ice arena and skating center

Coordinates: 33.32715°N 111.74084°W

- Interactive map of AZ Ice Gilbert
- Former names: Polar Ice Gilbert (2009-2014)
- Location: 2305 E Knox Rd; Gilbert, Arizona 85296
- Owner: Jim Rogers

Construction
- Opened: 2009
- Renovated: 2014

Tenant
- Phoenix Knights (WSHL) (2014-2018)

AZ Ice Gilbert is an ice arena and skating center located in Gilbert, Arizona. It was previously home to the Phoenix Knights of the Western States Hockey League and is the current home of the Arizona Hockey Union youth program.
