= Cheyenne Ice and Events Center =

2,000-seat multipurpose venue

Coordinates: 41°7′43.07″N 104°49′54.4″W

- Interactive map of Cheyenne Ice and Events Center
- Former names: Ikon Center; Taco John's Events Center
- Location: 1530 W Lincolnway Cheyenne, Wyoming; United States
- Owner: City of Cheyenne
- Operator: City of Cheyenne
- Capacity: 2,000 (600 for sporting events)

Construction
- Opened: 2000
- Cost: Unknown

Tenants
- Cheyenne Stampede (WSHL) (2011–2019); Cheyenne Warriors (APFL/DIFL) (2012–2013)

Cheyenne Ice and Events Center, formerly known as Taco John's Events Center and Ikon Center, is a 2,000-seat multipurpose venue. Located in Cheyenne, Wyoming, it opened in August 2000.

The Ice and Events Center is home to the Cheyenne Capitals youth hockey organization. The center is also capable of accommodating concerts, trade shows, parties, art shows, conventions, forums, and many other types of events. The Cheyenne Ice and Events Center is capable of seating 2,000 people for special events and 600 people in sporting event configurations. It was also the home of the Cheyenne Warriors of the American Professional Football League and the Cheyenne Stampede of the Western States Hockey League.

In 2011, the sponsorship agreement between the city of Cheyenne and the restaurant chain Taco John's expired.
