= Springfield Express =

- City: Springfield, Missouri
- League: WSHL
- Division: Midwest
- Founded: 2005
- Home arena: Mediacom Ice Park
- Colors: Red, white and blue
- Website: SpringfieldExpress.com

Franchise history
- 2005–2008: Cajun Catahoulas
- 2008–2009: Texas Renegades
- 2009–2014: New Mexico Renegades
- 2014–2018: Springfield Express

The Springfield Express was an AAU-sanctioned junior ice hockey team based in Springfield, Missouri and plays home games at the Mediacom Ice Park. The team is a member of the Western States Hockey League (WSHL).

== History ==
The franchise was founded in 2005 as the Cajun Catahoulas, based in Carencro, Louisiana. It moved after the 2008–09 season to North Richland Hills, Texas and was renamed the Texas Renegades. After the 2008–09 season in North Richland Hills, the team was moved to Blades Multiplex Arena in Rio Rancho, New Mexico and became the New Mexico Renegades. In 2011, the Renegades were purchased by Revolution Sports Management, Inc.

Following the 2013–14 season, the team announced a move to Springfield, Missouri and the Mediacom Ice Park and a name change to the Springfield Express. The team becomes the first junior hockey franchise in Springfield since the Springfield Spirit of the NAHL relocated to Alaska in 2005.

On April 29, 2016, after a successful 2015–16 season, it was announced that Revolution Sports Management had finalized the sale of the Express to 417 Sports Management. The new ownership group, based in Springfield, is owned by Dr. Brenton and Andrea Coger, formerly a billet family and team physician. Co-owner Andrea Coger was later accused stalking, sexually harassing, threatening a former player with whom she had apparently had a relationship while he was one of her legal-age billet players during the 2016–17 season.

During the 2017–18 season, the team went through an ownership transition with four investors to keep the team operating. After the season, the owners announced they could not negotiate lower fees for an arena lease and would suspend operations for the 2018–19 season.

== Season-by-season records ==
Season	GP	W	L	OTL	SOL	Pts	GF	GA	PIM	Regular season	Playoffs
2014–15	46	25	19	1	1	52	187	182	933	3rd of 6, Midwest; 15th of 28, WSHL	Won Div. Quarterfinals, 2–0 vs. Tulsa Jr. Oilers; Lost Div. Semifinals, 1–2 vs. Oklahoma City Blazers
2015–16	52	27	17	8	—	62	237	208	805	2nd of 6, Midwest; 12th of 29, WSHL	Div. Quarterfinals bye Won Div. Semifinals, 2–0 vs. Wichita Jr. Thunder; Lost Div. Finals, 1–2 vs. Oklahoma City Blazers
2016–17	52	36	15	1	—	73	263	178	867	4th of 6, Midwest; 9th of 27, WSHL	Won Div. Quarterfinals, 2–0 vs. Tulsa Jr. Oilers; Lost Div. Semifinals, 1–2 vs. El Paso Rhinos
2017–18	51	29	16	6	—	64	334	194	1003	3rd of 5, Midwest; 14th of 23, WSHL	Lost Div. Semifinals, 1–2 vs. Oklahoma City Jr. Blazers
