= New Mexico Renegades =

- City: Rio Rancho, New Mexico
- League: Western States Hockey League
- Division: Mountain
- Founded: 2005
- Home arena: Blades Multiplex Arena
- Colors: Red, White and Black

Franchise history
- 2006–2008: Cajun Catahoulas
- 2008–2009: Texas Renegades
- 2009–2014: New Mexico Renegades
- 2014–2018: Springfield Express

The New Mexico Renegades were a Tier III Junior A ice hockey team, based in Rio Rancho, New Mexico. The team played in the Mountain Division of the Western States Hockey League (WSHL). Their home games were played at the Blades Multiplex Arena. In 2014, the Renegades moved to Springfield, Missouri, and were renamed the Springfield Express.

== History ==
The franchise was founded in 2005 as the Cajun Catahoulas, based in Carencro, Louisiana. For the 2008–09 season the team was relocated North Richland Hills, Texas and renamed the Texas Renegades. After one season in Texas, the team was moved to Rio Rancho, New Mexico and became the New Mexico Renegades. Prior to the 2011–12 season, the Renegades were purchased by Revolution Sports Management, Inc., which later moved the team to Springfield, Missouri.

== Season-by-season records ==
Season	GP	W	L	OTL	Pts	GF	GA	PIM	Regular season finish	Playoffs
2009–10	52	8	43	1	17	103	304	799	5th of 5, Midwest	Did not qualify
2010–11	46	8	35	3	19	115	259	—	5th of 5, Midwest	Did not qualify
2011–12	46	18	26	2	38	148	213	1055	4th of 5, Midwest	Lost Div. Semifinals, 1-2 vs. El Paso Rhinos
2012–13	46	19	26	1	39	179	223	1332	5th of 6, Mountain	Did not qualify
2013–14	46	5	40	1	11	68	328	775	6th of 6, Mountain	Did not qualify
