= Cheyenne Stampede =

- City: Cheyenne, Wyoming
- League: WSHL
- Division: Mountain
- Founded: 2004
- Home arena: Cheyenne Ice and Events Center
- Colors: Brown, yellow, white
- Owner: Mark Lantz
- General manager: Mark Lantz

Franchise history
- 2004–2005: Tulsa Bazooka Blues
- 2005–2011: Tulsa Rampage
- 2011–2019: Cheyenne Stampede

The Cheyenne Stampede were a United Hockey Union-sanctioned junior ice hockey team in the Western States Hockey League (WSHL). The Stampede played their home games at the Cheyenne Ice and Events Center. The team announced it would not participate in the 2019–20 season due to a lease dispute.

== History ==
Prior to the 2011–12 season the team was the Tulsa Rampage, a USA Hockey-sanctioned Tier III Junior A ice hockey team, based in Tulsa, Oklahoma. The team played in the Midwest Division of the WSHL at the Oilers Ice Center.

In 2011, Julie Wilson, the owner at the time, sold the Rampage to Mark Lantz of Cheyenne, Wyoming.

During their eighth season in Cheyenne on February 24, 2019, Lantz announced the team was for sale or seeking additional investors. He claimed the city's new administration in 2018 made new lease for the arena with a 52% increase in the arena fees while simultaneously stipulating the team could no longer use advertisements around the ice rinks. The new administration, led by mayor Marian Orr, made the changes due to the city not want to charge the taxpayers to subsidize the ice rink as was being done with the previous contracts. On May 4, the team did not reach an agreement on a lease extension with the city and announced it would cease operations for at least the 2019–20 season with the franchise license returning to the league.

== Season-by-season records ==
Season	GP	W	L	OTW	OTL	Pts	GF	GA	PIM	Finish	Playoffs
Tulsa Rampage
2006–07	47	26	16	—	5	57	201	146	1350	2nd of 5, Midwest	Won Conf. Semifinals, 2–0 vs. Dallas Hawks; Lost Conf. Finals, 0–2 vs. El Paso Rhinos
2007–08	51	36	12	—	3	75	245	120	1179	2nd of 6, Midwest	Won Quarterfinals, 2–0 vs. San Antonio Diablos; Lost Semifinals, 0–2 vs. El Paso Rhinos
2008–09	49	34	14	—	1	69	235	126	885	2nd of 6, Midwest	Lost Div. Semifinals, 0–2 vs. San Antonio Diablos
2009–10	54	23	27	—	4	50	205	239	1071	3rd of 5, Midwest	Lost Div. Semifinals, 0–2 vs. Boulder Bison
2010–11	46	23	22	—	1	47	172	203	N/A	4th of 5, Midwest; 8th of 13, WSHL	Lost Div. Semifinals, 0–2 vs. El Paso Rhinos
Cheyenne Stampede
2011–12	46	22	20	—	4	48	177	200	1092	3rd of 5, Mountain; 9th of 16, WSHL	Lost Div. Semifinals, 0–2 vs. Boulder Bison
2012–13	46	26	17	—	3	55	160	146	1105	3rd of 6, Mountain; 7th of 18, WSHL	Lost Div. Semifinals, 0–2 vs. Boulder Bison
2013–14	46	28	16	—	2	58	219	149	839	2nd of 6, Mountain; 7th of 18, WSHL	Lost Div. Semifinals, 1–2 vs. Colorado Jr. Eagles
2014–15	46	17	25	—	4	38	166	202	658	6th of 7, Mountain; 18th of 28, WSHL	Lost Div. Quarterfinals, 0–2 vs. Colorado Jr. Eagles
2015–16	52	22	28	—	2	46	209	222	1065	6th of 7, Mountain; 19th of 29, WSHL	Lost Div. Quarterfinals, 0–2 vs. Casper Coyotes
2016–17	52	17	32	—	3	37	212	267	1010	5th of 6, Mountain; 19th of 27, WSHL	Lost Div. Quarterfinals, 0–2 vs. Casper Coyotes
2017–18	50	2	48	—	0	4	64	436	804	6th of 6, Mountain; 23rd of 23, WSHL	Lost Div. Quarterfinals, 0–2 vs. Colorado Jr. Eagles
2018–19	51	7	40	2	2	27 (Note: Beginning with the 2018–19 season, the WSHL began awarding 3pts for a win, 2pts for an overtime win, and 1pt for an overtime loss.)	110	319	1301	5th of 5, Mountain; 21st of 23, WSHL	Forfeit Play-in series vs. Steamboat Wranglers

== Coaches ==
- Jeff Heimel (2011–2013)
- Eric Ballard (2014–2015)
- Gary Gill (2013–2014, 2015–2017)
- Joe Pfleegor (March – September 2017)
- Joe Liquori (September – November 15, 2017)
- Neil Breen (November 16, 2017 – 2019)
