= Ogden Mustangs =

- City: Ogden, Utah
- League: North American Hockey League (NAHL)
- Division: Mountain
- Founded: 2009
- Home arena: The Ice Sheet
- Colors: Blue, red, and white
- Owners: Sean Wilmert; Kimberly Wilmert
- Head coach: Kenny Orlando
- Affiliates: Minnesota Squatch (Premier)

Franchise history
- 2009–2011: Bakersfield Jr. Condors
- 2011–present: Ogden Mustangs

Championships
- Division titles: 4 (2013–14, 2014–15, 2017–18, 2018–19)

The Ogden Mustangs are a junior ice hockey team based in Ogden, Utah. The Mustangs are members of the North American Hockey League (NAHL) and play their home games at The Ice Sheet at Ogden.

Before joining the NAHL in 2026, the Mustangs were members of the United States Premier Hockey League (USPHL) and its National Collegiate Development Conference (NCDC); before joining the USPHL in 2020, the Mustangs and its predecessors were longtime members of the Western States Hockey League (WSHL).

== History ==
David and Lori Miller originally purchased the Bakersfield Jr. Condors franchise in 2009 as a member of the Western States Hockey League (WSHL). Prior to purchasing the team, Lori Miller acted as the director of youth hockey for Kern County hockey clubs for nine years. Outside of hockey, the Millers own an oil well welding and a construction company based in California. The team relocated from Bakersfield, California, in the summer of 2011, and became the Ogden Mustangs. The Weber County Ice Sheet, located on the campus of Weber State University, was one of several host venues for the 2002 Winter Olympics. As a result, many upgrades and amenities have been added and was one of the deciding factors in the relocation of the team. They are the second junior team to play in Ogden, the first was the Ogden Blades, who played the 1993–94 season in the American Frontier Hockey League.

In 2020, the Mustangs left the WSHL and joined the Premier Division of the United States Premier Hockey League (USPHL), another independent junior hockey league. The Miller family then sold the team to Sean and Kimberly Wilmert.

On June 12, 2026, it was announced that the Mustangs would leave the USPHL and NCDC to join the North American Hockey League for the 2026-27 season as one of five charter teams in its new Mountain Division.

== Season-by-season records ==
Note: GP = Games played, W = Wins, L = Losses, T = Ties, OTL = Overtime losses, Pts = Points, GF = Goals for, GA = Goals against, PIM = Penalties in minutes

Season	GP	W	L	OTW	OTL	Pts	GF	GA	Regular season finish	Playoffs
2011–12	46	13	29	—	3	29	143	227	4th of 5, Mountain	Lost Div. Semifinals, 0–2 vs. Idaho Jr. Steelheads
2012–13	46	18	22	—	6	42	166	192	3rd of 5, Northwest	Lost Div. Semifinals, 1–2 vs. Southern Oregon Spartans
2013–14	46	31	12	—	3	65	253	128	2nd of 6, Northwest	Won Div. Semifinals, 2–0 vs. Salt Lake City Moose; Won Div. Finals, 2–0 vs. Idaho Jr. Steelheads; 1–2–0 in Thorne Cup Finals round-robin (W, 5–4 vs Knights)( L, 2–3 vs. Jr. Brahmas) ( L, 2–7 vs. Jr. Steelheads)
2014–15	46	31	13	—	2	64	218	120	2nd of 7, Mountain	Won Div. Semifinals, 2–0 vs. Colorado Jr. Eagles; Won Div. Finals, 2–1 vs. Casper Coyotes; Lost Conference Finals, 0–2 vs. El Paso Rhinos
2015–16	52	38	12	—	2	78	263	130	2nd of 7, Mountain; 6th of 29, WSHL	Div. Quarterfinals bye Won Div. Semifinals, 2–0 vs. Casper Coyotes; Lost Div. Finals, 1–2 vs. Colorado Jr. Eagles
2016–17	52	42	7	—	3	87	267	98	1st of 6, Mountain; 3rd of 27, WSHL	Div. Quarterfinals, BYE; Won Div. Semifinals, 2–1 vs. Casper Coyotes; Lost Div. Finals, 1–2 vs. Colorado Jr. Eagles; 3–0–0, 2nd of 6, Thorne Cup rd-robin (as host) (W, 3–2 vs. Jr. Steelheads)(W, 6–0 vs. Bombers) ( W, 3–1 vs. Jr. Eagles); L, Thorne Cup Semifinal gm, 2–4 vs. Wichita Jr. Thunder
2017–18	51	38	12	—	1	77	353	133	2nd of 6, Mountain; 5th of 23, WSHL	Div. Quarterfinals bye Won Div. Semifinals, 2–1 vs. Colorado Jr. Eagles; Won Div. Finals, 2–0 vs. Utah Outliers; 3–0–0, 1st of 6, Thorne Cup round-robin (W, 4–2 vs. Outliers; W, 4–2 vs. Bombers; W, 5–3 vs. Jr. Blazers); Won Thorne Cup Semifinal game, 10–3 vs. Long Beach Bombers; Lost Thorne Cup Championship game, 2–3 vs. El Paso Rhinos
2018–19	51	47	2	0	2	143 (Note: Beginning with the 2018–19 season, the WSHL awarded 3pts for a win, 2pts for an overtime win, and 1pt for an overtime loss.)	341	86	1st of 5, Mountain; 1st of 23, WSHL	Won Div. Semifinals, 2–0 vs. Steamboat Wranglers; Won Div. Finals, 2–1 vs. Utah Outliers; 2–0–0–1, 2nd of 6, Thorne Cup round-robin (W, 4–2 vs. Jr. Blazers; W, 4–1 vs. Aeros; OTL, 2–3 vs. Rhinos); Won Thorne Cup Semifinal game, 7–0 vs. Edson Aeros; Lost Thorne Cup Championship game, 0–2 vs. El Paso Rhinos
2019–20	51	46	3	1	1	141	340	74	1st of 5, Northwest; 1st of 20, WSHL	Playoffs cancelled due to the COVID-19 pandemic
United States Premier Hockey League - Premier League
2020–21	50	29	17	—	4	62	202	159	1st of 5, Mountain; 14th of 62, Premier	0–3–0 Mountain Division National Championship Qualifier round-robin (L, 1–4 vs. Bulls; L, 2–3 vs. Eagles; L, 1–4 vs. Outliers)
2021–22	50	31	13	—	6	68	211	128	2nd of 5, Mountain; 19th of 64, Premier	Lost Div. Semifinal, 1-2 vs. Northern Colorado Eagles
2022–23	52	35	13	1	3	74	260	165	2nd of 6, Mountain; 21st of 69, Premier	Won Div. Semifinal, 2-1 vs. Pueblo Bulls; Lost Div. Finals 0-2 Utah Outliers; Advance to National Finals; Seeding Rd (L, 0-4 Hudson Havoc) & (w, 4-3 Charlotte Rush); Round of 16 (L, 2-4 Metro Jets)
Move up to - NCDC League
2023–24	53	37	12	3	1	78	195	125	1st of 6, Mountain; 3rd of 18, NCDC	tbd Div. Semifinal, 2-0 vs. Idaho Falls Spud Kings; Won Mountain Final 3-0 Utah Outliers; Lost Dineen Cup 1-2 (South Shore Kings)
2024–25	53	37	13	2	1	77	198	124	2nd of 6, Mountain; 5th of 22, NCDC	Won Div. Semifinal, 3-1 vs. Utah Outliers; Lost Div. Finals 1-3 Idaho Falls Spud Kings
