= Wichita Jr. Thunder =

- City: Wichita, Kansas
- League: Western States Hockey League
- Division: Midwest
- Founded: 2012
- Home arena: Wichita Ice Center
- Colors: Blue, white, and black
- Head coach: Matt Summers

Franchise history
- 2012–2020: Wichita Jr. Thunder

Championships
- Playoff championships: 1 (2017)

The Wichita Jr. Thunder were an Amateur Athletic Union-sanctioned junior ice hockey team based in Wichita, Kansas, and played home games at the Wichita Ice Center. The team was a member of the Western States Hockey League (WSHL). The league and team were dormant for the 2020–21 season due to the COVID-19 pandemic, but the Jr. Thunder were not included as a member of the league when it restarted in 2021.

In addition to games played during the regular season, the Jr. Thunder played an exhibition game against the Wichita Thunder alumni at the Intrust Bank Arena. Former Thunder player Rob Weingartner was the team's head coach from 2012 to 2019.

== Season-by-season records ==
Season	GP	W	L	OTW	OTL	SOL	Pts	GF	GA	PIM	Regular season finish	Playoffs
2012–13	46	8	36	—	2	1	18	131	359	1,302	5th of 5, Midwest	Did not qualify
2013–14	46	4	41	—	0	1	9	99	371	1,066	6th of 6, Midwest	Did not qualify
2014–15	46	17	26	—	3	0	37	131	359	896	5th of 6, Midwest	Lost Div. Quarterfinals, 0–2 vs. Dallas Snipers
2015–16	52	30	21	—	1	—	61	230	206	915	3rd of 6, Midwest; 13th of 29, WSHL	Won Div. Quarterfinals, 2–0 vs. Dallas Snipers; Lost Div. Semifinals, 0–2 vs. Springfield Express
2016–17	52	35	13	—	4	—	74	293	175	1,008	3rd of 6, Midwest; 8th of 27, WSHL	Won Div. Quarterfinals, 2–0 vs. Dallas Snipers; Won Div. Semifinals, 2–0 vs. Oklahoma City Blazers; Won Div. Finals, 2–0 vs. El Paso Rhinos; 3–0–0, 1st of 6, Thorne Cup round-robin (W, 6–3 vs. Bombers; W, 6–5 vs. Jr. Eagles; W, 2–1 vs. Jr. Steelheads); Won Thorne Cup Semifinal game, 4–2 vs. Ogden Mustangs; Won Thorne Cup Championship game, 4–3 vs. Idaho Jr. Steelheads
2017–18	51	3	48	—	0	—	6	70	546	1,246	5th of 5, Midwest; 23rd of 23, WSHL	Did not qualify
2018–19	51	13	35	1	2	—	43 (Note: Beginning with the 2018–19 season, the WSHL began awarding 3pts for a win, 2pts for an overtime win, and 1pt for an overtime loss.)	144	335	1,001	5th of 5, Midwest; 18th of 23, WSHL	Lost Play-in series, 0–2 vs. Dallas Snipers
2019–20	51	6	40	3	2	—	26	113	397	1,103	6th of 6, Midwest; 18th of 20, WSHL	Did not qualify
