= Cajun Catahoulas =

- City: Carencro, Louisiana
- League: Western States Hockey League
- Division: Midwest
- Founded: 2005
- Home arena: Louisiana HockeyPlex

Franchise history
- 2005–2008: Cajun Catahoulas
- 2008–2009: Texas Renegades
- 2009–2014: New Mexico Renegades
- 2014–2018: Springfield Express

The Cajun Catahoulas were a Junior A Tier III ice hockey team, based in Carencro, Louisiana, which is located just outside Lafayette. Initially announced in May 2005 as a Junior B team, the Catahoulas were promoted to Junior A Tier III in August 2007. The team competed in the Midwest division of the Western States Hockey League (WSHL) beginning in 2005–06 season. The Catahoula name was chosen as the Catahoula Leopard Dog is the state dog of Louisiana. For the 2008–09 season the Cajun Catahoulas moved their team and operations to North Richland Hills, Texas to become the Texas Renegades.

== Season-by-season records ==
Season	GP	W	L	OTL	Pts	GF	GA	PIM	Regular season finish	Playoffs
2005–06	40	11	28	1	23	129	239	—	4th of 6, Midwest	Lost Div. Semifinal vs. Fort Worth Texans
2006–07	44	3	41	0	6	113	323	2000	6th of 6, Midwest	Did not qualify
2007–08	51	5	44	2	12	104	356	1569	6th of 6, Midwest	Did not qualify
