= Rocky Mountain Junior Hockey League (2015–2018) =

- Sport: Ice hockey
- Founded: May 2, 2014
- President: Shaun Hathaway
- Commissioner: Adrian Veideman
- No. of teams: 5
- Country: United States
- Most recent champion: Steamboat Wranglers (2018)
- Website: RMJHL.co

The Rocky Mountain Junior Hockey League (RMJHL) was an American Tier III junior ice hockey league sanctioned by USA Hockey. The RMJHL was approved for play starting in the 2015–16 season.

== History ==
The league was announced and sanctioned by USA Hockey on May 2, 2014. Six teams played in the inaugural 2015–16 season.

In December 2015, league officials announced that they were applying to USA Hockey to expand the league by adding franchises in Vail and Pueblo, but neither team came to fruition.

On May 3, 2016, the RMJHL announced the addition of an expansion team in Steamboat Springs, led by managing partner, Troy Mick, CEO and president of the Canadian Junior A Salmon Arm Silverbacks of the British Columbia Hockey League.

On May 31, 2016, the Breckenridge Bucks left the RMJHL for the Western States Hockey League (WSHL). On July 11, the RMJHL would announce a new Breckenridge team, called the Bears, with an ownership group headed by Joe Dibble, the general manager and head coach of the Tier II junior Janesville Jets of the North American Hockey League. When the 2016–17 season schedule was announced, the Glacier Yetis were placed in dormancy due to lack of players. On the opening day of the second season, the new Breckenridge team was removed from the schedule as well.

For the 2017–18 season, former Denver Pioneers captain Adrian Veidman was named the league's new commissioner in May. The league again announced a team in Breckenridge called the Bolts. The new Breckenridge team is to be operated by the Summit Youth Hockey organization and coached by Kory DeKoevend. In August, the Aspen Leafs announced they would go dormant for the upcoming season.

After three seasons, the RMJHL ceased all operations and folded in 2018. The Steamboat Wranglers were the only organization to continue with a junior team and joined the WSHL for 2018–19, but ceased operations midway through the 2019–20 season.

== Teams ==
Team	Location	Arena	Joined
Breckenridge Bolts	Breckenridge, Colorado	Stephen C. West Ice Arena	2017
Colorado Rampage	Monument, Colorado	Colorado Sports Center	2015
Colorado Thunderbirds	Littleton, Colorado	South Suburban Ice Arena	2015
Pikes Peak Miners	Colorado Springs, Colorado	Sertich Ice Arena	2015
Steamboat Wranglers	Steamboat Springs, Colorado	Howelsen Arena	2016

== Champions ==
Season	Regular season	Playoff Champion	Runner-up	Result
2015–16	Pikes Peak Miners (69 pts)	Aspen Leafs	Pikes Peak Miners	Championship Game; 4–3 (OT)
2016–17	Pikes Peak Miners (64 pts)	Pikes Peak Miners	Steamboat Wranglers	2-games-to-1 (9–4, 1–5, 6–5)
2017–18	Steamboat Wranglers (65 pts)	Steamboat Wranglers	Pikes Peak Miners	Championship Game; 9–2

== Former teams ==
- Aspen Leafs (Aspen, Colorado) – Founding member in the 2015–16 season; went dormant prior to the 2017–18 season due to lack of players.
- Breckenridge Bears (Breckenridge, Colorado) – Announced for the 2016–17 season, but did not play.
- Breckenridge Bucks (Breckenridge, Colorado; 2015–16) – Joined the Western States Hockey League in 2016, then relocated to Vail, Colorado, as the Vail Powder Hounds prior to the 2016–17 season. The Vail team would fold in November 2016 due to lack of players.
- Glacier Yetis (Grand Junction, Colorado; 2015–16) – Originally announced as the Grand Junction Coyotes while the league was in its pre-launch stages. League announced the team would be dormant for the 2016–17 season due to lack of players.
