= Cheyenne Warriors =

US indoor football team

Logo

General information
- Founded: 2011
- Folded: 2013
- Headquartered: Cheyenne, Wyoming at the Cheyenne Ice and Events Center
- Colors: Blue, black, white

Personnel
- Owner: Toby SerVoss
- General manager: Alton Walker

Team history
- Cheyenne Warriors (2012–2013)

Home fields
- Cheyenne Ice and Events Center (2012–2013)

League / conference affiliations
- American Professional Football League (2012); Developmental Indoor Football League (2013)

The Cheyenne Warriors were a professional indoor football team which was most recently a member of the Developmental Indoor Football League. Based in Cheyenne, Wyoming, the Warriors played their home games at the Cheyenne Ice and Events Center. The team had been a member of the Indoor Football League with intent to play in the 2013 IFL season until the principal owner's death forced them to withdraw from the IFL.

== History ==
For their inaugural season, the Warriors played in the American Professional Football League, finishing at the bottom of the league standings at 0–8.

Beginning in 2013, the Warriors were scheduled to play in the Indoor Football League. The Warriors were expected to form strong rivalries with fellow I-25 team the Colorado Ice as well as their in-state rivals from Casper the Wyoming Cavalry. On January 21, 2013, the IFL announced that the team would not be entering the league as planned due to the late December 2012 death of the team's owner.

In January 2013 the Warriors announced that they were forming a new league, the Developmental Indoor Football League. The team played several games in the DIFL before folding in late May 2013, citing financial issues.

== Head coaches ==
Name	Term	Regular season				Playoffs		Awards
Name	Term	W	L	T	Win%	W	L	Awards
Damon Ware	2012–2013	4	8	0	.333	0	0	

== Season-by-season results ==
Note: The finish, wins, losses, and ties columns list regular season results and exclude any postseason play.

League champions	Conference champions	Division champions	Wild card berth	League leader

Season	Team	League	Conference	Division	Regular season				Postseason results
Season	Team	League	Conference	Division	Finish	Wins	Losses	Ties	Postseason results
2012	2012	APFL			8th	0	8	0	
2013	2013	DIFL				4	0	0	
Totals						4	8	0	All-time regular season record (2012-2013)
Totals						0	0	-	All-time postseason record (2012-2013)
Totals						4	8	0	All-time regular season and postseason record (2012-2013)
