= Superior RoughRiders =

- City: Boulder Valley, Colorado
- League: WSHL
- Founded: 2007
- Home arena: Sport Stable
- Colors: Green, white, black
- Owner: RoughRiders® Hockey Club
- General manager: Paul DePuydt
- Head coach: Paul DePuydt

Franchise history
- 2007–2009: Colorado Outlaws
- 2009–2014: Boulder Junior Bison
- 2014–2015: Colorado RoughRiders
- 2015–2018: Superior RoughRiders

The Superior RoughRiders were a junior ice hockey organization based in Superior, Boulder County, Colorado. The team played in the Western States Hockey League at the Sport Stable in Superior. The Superior RoughRiders are owned by the RoughRiders Hockey Club.

== Team history ==
Team logo when the franchise played as the Boulder Junior Bison from 2009-2014.

Under previous ownership, The RoughRiders were formerly known as the Colorado Outlaws from 2007 to 2009. The Colorado Outlaws played in Westminster, Colorado.

In 2009, the franchise was relocated to Boulder Valley Ice in nearby Superior, Colorado, and named the Boulder Junior Bison. In its inaugural season in Superior, the team went 40–18–2 for second place in the division. The Junior Bison advanced to the Thorne Cup finals, but lost to the Phoenix Polar Bears. As the runners-up in the WSHL, the Bison qualified for the USA Hockey Tier III Junior A National Championships held in Marlborough, Massachusetts. The Bison lost all three games, being outscored 19–2. The Bison moved 10 total players either up on call up or to NCAA.

In its sophomore year in Superior, the Bison earned a regular season record of 33–12–3 record. During the first round of the WSHL playoffs, the Bison swept the Texas Jr. Brahmas with victories in both games one and two (8–7 in overtime and 11–5). They were then eliminated in the Mid-Western Division Finals, losing the series 0–2 to division rival El Paso Rhinos. 11 players from this Bison roster moved on to higher levels of hockey.

On April 15, 2014, the RoughRiders Hockey Club purchased the Jr. Bison and renamed the team the RoughRiders after their junior hockey team in the United States Hockey League, the Cedar Rapids RoughRiders. The team then moved to a new complex called Boulder Valley Ice & Indoor Sports starting with the 2015–16 season. On June 9, 2015, the RoughRiders announced that in order to connect better with their community, the team would be known as the Superior RoughRiders.

In 2018, the RoughRiders were no longer listed as members of the WSHL and their website was shut down.

== Statistics ==
=== Regular season records ===
Season	GP	W	L	OTL	PTS	GF	GA	PIM	Finish
Colorado Outlaws
2007–08	51	25	23	3	53	192	219	1261	4th of 6, Midwest
2008–09	49	17	31	1	35	195	275	1734	4th of 6, Midwest
Boulder Bison
2009–10	52	35	16	1	71	262	163	1364	2nd, Midwest
2010–11	46	31	12	3	65	220	135	878	2nd, Midwest
2011–12	46	33	10	3	69	234	189	809	2nd of 5, Mountain
2012–13	46	29	14	3	61	177	128	845	2nd of 6, Mountain
2013-14	46	24	22	0	48	174	147	836	4th of 6, Mountain
Colorado RoughRiders
2014–15	46	29	13	4	62	207	117	620	3rd of 7, Mountain
Superior RoughRiders
2015–16	52	26	23	3	55	172	159	616	4th of 7, Mountain
2016–17	52	15	31	6	36	144	212	656	6th of 6, Mountain
2017–18	51	25	25	1	51	213	211	825	4th of 6, Mountain

=== Playoff records ===
Season	GP	W	L	GF	GA	Finish
Colorado Outlaws
2008	2	0	2	1	16	Lost in 1st round
2009	2	0	2	5	11	Lost in 1st round
Boulder Bison
2010	8	5	3	32	24	Lost in Finals
2011	4	2	2	23	24	Lost in 2nd round
2012	5	3	2	20	12	Lost in 2nd round
2013	4	2	2	10	7	Lost in 2nd round
2014	3	1	2	9	17	Lost in 1st round
Colorado RoughRiders
2015	3	1	2	8	12	Lost in 1st round
Superior RoughRiders
2016	5	2	3	13	18	Lost in 2nd round
2017	2	0	2	2	12	Lost in 1st round
2018	5	3	2	14	11	Lost in 2nd round

Playoffs

- 2008 – Lost Midwest Division Semi-final

El Paso Rhinos defeated Colorado Outlaws 2-games-to-0

- 2009 – Lost Midwest Division Semi-final

El Paso Rhinos defeated Colorado Outlaws 2-games-to-0

- 2010 – Lost Thorne Cup Finals

Boulder Bison defeated Tulsa Rampage 2-games-to-0
Boulder Bison defeated El Paso Rhinos 2-games-to-1
Phoenix Polar Bears defeated Boulder Bison 2-games-to-1

- 2011 – Lost Mountain Divisional Finals

Boulder Bison defeated Texas Jr. Brahmas 2-games-to-0
El Paso Rhinos defeated Boulder Bison 2-games-to-0

- 2012 – Lost Mountain Divisional Finals

Boulder Bison defeated Cheyenne Stampede 2-games-to-0
Idaho Jr. Steelheads defeated Boulder Bison 2-games-to-1

- 2013 – Lost Mountain Divisional Finals

Boulder Bison defeated Cheyenne Stampede 2-games-to-0
El Paso Rhinos defeated Boulder Bison 2-games-to-0

- 2014 – Lost Mountain Divisional Semifinals

Phoenix Knights defeated Boulder Bison 2-games-to-1

- 2015 – Lost Mountain Divisional Quarterfinal

Salt Lake City Moose defeated Colorado RoughRiders 2-games-to-1

- 2016 – Lost Mountain Divisional Semifinals

Superior RoughRiders defeated Salt Lake City Moose 2-games-to-1
Colorado Jr. Eagles defeated Superior RoughRiders 2-games-to-0

- 2017 – Lost Mountain Divisional Quarterfinals

Utah Outliers defeated Superior RoughRiders 2-games-to-0

- 2018 – Lost Mountain Divisional Semifinals

Superior RoughRiders defeated Casper Coyotes 2-games-to-0
Utah Outliers defeated Superior RoughRiders 2-games-to-1

== Alumni ==
The Bison had a number of alumni move on to NCAA Division III, ACHA Division I and II, and higher levels of junior ice hockey, and professional ice hockey, including: Zachariah Axel Ziegler (Assistant Coach, 2007-2009) went on to work in the National Hockey League as a member of the coaching staff of both the Nashville Predators (Video Assistant, 2009-2013) and the Los Angeles Kings (Video Coordiantor, 2013-2015).
