= Tahoe Icemen =

Lake Tahoe Lakers
- City: South Lake Tahoe, California
- League: USPHL Premier
- Division: Pacific
- Founded: 2012
- Home arena: South Lake Tahoe Ice Arena
- Owner(s): Ryan Cruthers, Jocelyn Langlois, and Saul Salama
- General manager: Mickey Lang (2016–17)
- Head coach: Mickey Lang (2016–17)

Franchise history
- 2012–2013: Bay Area Seals
- 2013–2015: Lake Tahoe Blue
- 2015–2018: Tahoe Icemen

The Lake Tahoe Lakers are an American junior hockey team from South Lake Tahoe, California. The team will be based out of the South Lake Tahoe Ice Arena The team was announced as a member of the United States Premier Hockey League's Premier league on April 21, 2021 to begin play with the 2021-22 playing season.[1] The team ownership also owns the Charlotte Rush and Charleston Colonials. They are partnering with Lake Tahoe Academy to operate the team.

The team logo was inspired by the NHL Outdoors at Lake Tahoe event held February 20–21, 2021 which was held on the shore of Lake Tahoe on the 18th fairway of the Edgewood Tahoe Resort in Stateline, Nevada.

== History ==
=== Bay Area Seals (2012–2013) ===
After a start to the team's first season that saw them earn only 3 wins in their first 18 games, the Seals would finish strong and earn second place in the Pacific Division and their first Thorne Cup playoff appearance. The Seals would make a strong playoff run but would lose the Thorne Cup Championship game to Idaho Jr. Steelheads by a final score of 2-4.

By finishing as runner-up in playoffs, the Seals were invited to be the second of the WSHL's representatives (along with the Jr. Steelheads) at the 2013 United Hockey Union National Championship Tournament. In the three-game round-robin stage of the tournament, the Seals would lose to the Lake George Fighting Spirit of the Northern States Hockey League (NSHL) before beating the Hartland Hounds and Tennyson Chevrolets, both of the Midwest Junior Hockey League (MWJHL), to move on to the tournament's semi-final round. They beat the NSHL's Syracuse Stampede before losing the UHU National Championship game to the Jr. Steelheads by a score of 1-5.

=== Lake Tahoe (2013–2018) ===
Team logo when the franchise played as the Lake Tahoe Blue 2013–2015.

The team would relocate to South Lake Tahoe and call themselves the Lake Tahoe Blue for the 2013–14 season after owner Chris Collins sold the team to Tahoe Hockey Partners, LLC. Collins continued on as the team's general manager for the remainder of the season. After a sub-par 2013-14 season, Collins would be replaced with Michael Richardson, who had also been hired as head coach, while Spencer Jamison, son of Greg Jamison, would take over the position of President. The 2014–15 season would also leave the Blue out of playoff position.

On April 20, 2015, it was announced that the team had changed its name to the Tahoe Icemen. On May 4, 2015, the Icemen announced the hiring of Tom Maroste as head coach and general manager for the 2015–16 season. After one season, in which the Icemen won only two games, Maroste was replaced by former professional hockey player Mickey Lang.

Prior to the 2018–19 season, the team announced it would be going dormant with the possibility of return for the 2019–20 season. It was claimed that the South Lake Tahoe Ice Arena was having maintenance issues and that during the dormancy, the ice plant could be repaired.

=== Lake Tahoe (2021–2024) ===
After one season as the Anaheim Avalanche the franchise is re-located and re-branded as the Lake Tahoe Lakers, bringing junior hockey back to South Tahoe Lake.

== Season-by-season records ==
Season	GP	W	L	OTL	SOL	Pts	GF	GA	Regular season finish	Playoffs
Bay Area Seals
2012–13	46	26	16	1	3	56	201	193	2nd of 5, Pacific; 6th of 22, WSHL	Won Div. Semifinals, 2–1 vs. Valencia Flyers; Won Div. Finals, 2–1 vs. Fresno Monsters; 1–1 in Thorne Cup round robin (L, 3–6 vs. Rhinos; W, 4–2 vs. Ice Jets); Won Semifinal game, 7–2 vs. El Paso Rhinos; Lost Thorne Cup Championship game, 2–4 vs. Idaho Jr. Steelheads
Lake Tahoe Blue
2013–14	46	19	24	2	1	41	181	227	5th of 6, Pacific; 17th of 24, WSHL	Did not qualify
2014–15	46	7	36	2	1	17	130	269	7th of 7, Northwest; 25th of 28, WSHL	Did not qualify
Tahoe Icemen
2015–16	52	2	50	0	—	4	83	412	7th of 7, Northwest; 29th of 29, WSHL	Did not qualify
2016–17	52	15	33	4	—	34	174	307	5th of 7, Northwest; 21st of 27, WSHL	Won Div. Quarterfinals, 2–0 vs. Vancouver Rangers; Lost Div. Semifinals, 0–2 vs. Idaho Jr. Steelheads
2017–18	51	28	20	3	—	59	241	226	2nd of 6, Northwest; 11th of 23, WSHL	Div. Quarterfinals bye Won Div. Semifinals, 2–0 vs. Bellingham Blazers; Lost Div. Finals, 0–2 vs. Idaho IceCats
Anaheim Avalanche USPHL - Premier
2020–20	36	9	27	0	0	18	96	188	3rd of 6, Pacific; 53rd of 61, Premier	Lost Div. Semifinal 0-2 (Las Vegas Thunderbirds)
Lake Tahoe Lakers USPHL - Premier
2021–22	44	22	21	0	1	45	198	183	3rd of 6, Pacific; 29th of 64, Premier	Lost Div. Semifinal 0-4 game vs. (Las Vegas Thunderbirds)
2022–23	42	3	37	2	0	8	97	276	7th of 7, Pacific; 68th of 70, Premier	Did Not Qualify
2023–24	46	18	24	3	1	40	147	195	5th of 7, Pacific; 40th of 61, Premier	Did Not Qualify
2024–25	46	33	10	2	1	69	278	148	2nd of 8, Pacific; 12th of 73, Premier	Lost Div. Semifinal 0-2 vs. (Ontario Jr. Reign )

== United Hockey Union National Championship Tournament ==
AAU Sanctioned Junior A National Championship
In 2013 & 2014, the Midwest Junior Hockey League (MWJHL), Northern States Hockey League (NSHL), and the Western States Hockey League (WSHL) advanced two teams each in the tournament.

Year	Round Robin	Record Ranking	Semifinal Game	Championship Game
2013	OTL, Lake George Fighting Spirit (NSHL) 3-4; W, Hartland Hounds (MWJHL) 4-3; W, Tennyson Chevrolet (MWJHL) 6-0	2-0-1; 2nd of 6	OTW, Syracuse Stampede (NSHL) 1-0	L, Idaho Jr. Steelheads (WSHL) 1-5
