= 2014 Kelly Cup playoffs =

Ice hockey tournament

Tournament details
- Teams: 16

Final positions
- Champions: Alaska Aces
- Runner-up: Cincinnati Cyclones

The 2014 Kelly Cup Playoffs of the ECHL started following the April 13th conclusion of the 2013–14 ECHL regular season.

== Playoff seeds ==
After the regular season, 16 teams qualified for the playoffs. The Alaska Aces were the Western Conference regular season champions and the Brabham Cup winners with the best record, making them the first team in league history to win the Brabham Cup in four consecutive seasons. The Reading Royals earned the top seed in the Eastern Conference.

=== Eastern Conference ===
1. Reading Royals
2. Kalamazoo Wings
3. South Carolina Stingrays
4. Orlando Solar Bears
5. Cincinnati Cyclones
6. Wheeling Nailers
7. Greenville Road Warriors
8. Fort Wayne Komets

=== Western Conference ===
1. Alaska Aces
2. Ontario Reign
3. Utah Grizzlies
4. Idaho Steelheads
5. Colorado Eagles
6. Bakersfield Condors
7. Stockton Thunder
8. Las Vegas Wranglers

== Playoff Brackets ==
Conference quarterfinals	Conference semifinals
1	Reading Royals	1
8	Fort Wayne Komets	4
8	Fort Wayne	2
5	Cincinnati	4
4	Orlando Solar Bears	2
5	Cincinnati Cyclones	4
Eastern Conference
2	Kalamazoo Wings	2
7	Greenville Road Warriors	4
7	Greenville	4
6	Wheeling	2
3	South Carolina Stingrays	0
6	Wheeling Nailers	4
1	Alaska Aces	4
8	Las Vegas Wranglers	0
1	Alaska	4
4	Idaho	1
4	Idaho Steelheads	4
5	Colorado Eagles	2
Western Conference
2	Ontario Reign	0
7	Stockton Thunder	4
7	Stockton	1
6	Bakersfield	4
3	Utah Grizzlies	1
6	Bakersfield Condors	4

Conference finals
5	Cincinnati	4
7	Greenville	2
1	Alaska	4
6	Bakersfield	2

Kelly Cup finals
5	Cincinnati	2
1	Alaska	4

== See also ==
- 2013–14 ECHL season
- List of ECHL seasons

Preceded by 2013 Kelly Cup playoffs	Kelly Cup Playoffs; 2014	Succeeded by 2015 Kelly Cup playoffs
