= Phoenix Knights =

- City: Gilbert, Arizona
- League: WSHL
- Division: Western
- Founded: 1999
- Home arena: AZ Ice Gilbert
- Colors: Purple, silver, black
- Website: www.phoenixknightshockey.com

Franchise history
- 1999–2011: Phoenix Polar Bears
- 2011–2018: Phoenix Knights

Championships
- Division titles: 2013–14

Phoenix Knights were an Amateur Athletic Union-sanctioned Tier II junior ice hockey team based out of Gilbert, Arizona. The Knights were a part of the Western States Hockey League and played in the Western Division. Their home games were played at AZ Ice Gilbert in Gilbert, Arizona. The organization was operated by Arizona Hockey Club, Inc, which also runs a local youth hockey program.

== History ==
The franchise, originally known as the Phoenix Polar Bears, joined the WSHL in 1999. In 2011, the owners of the Polar Bears dropped their WSHL membership when the league left USA Hockey sanctioning for the Amateur Athletic Union. The franchise was sold to Arizona Hockey Clubs, Inc. and was renamed as the Phoenix Knights.

Colten St. Clair was named head coach and general manager in March 2017. St. Clair grew up in Gilbert, Arizona, before playing junior hockey for the Fargo Force of the United States Hockey League and in NCAA Division I for the University of North Dakota. After one season and being named the coach of the year for 2017–18, St. Clair left to become a volunteer assistant coach for the NCAA Division I University of Maine.

The organization then failed to find a new head coach in time to adequately recruit for the 2018–19 season and withdrew from participation.

== Season-by-season records ==
Season	GP	W	L	OTL	PTS	GF	GA	PIM	Finish	Playoffs
2011–12	46	11	33	2	24	138	273	1001	6th of 6, Western	Did not qualify
2012–13	46	19	23	4	42	166	202	1270	4th of 6, Mountain	Lost Conf. Semifinals, 0–2 vs. El Paso Rhinos
2013–14	46	32	12	2	66	255	138	907	1st of 6, Mountain	Won Div. Semifinals, 2-1 vs. Boulder Bison; Won Div. Finals, 2–1 vs. Colorado Jr. Eagles; 1–2–0 in Thorne Cup Round Robin (4–5 vs. Mustangs; 3–5 vs. Rhinos; 3–1 vs. Monsters); Lost Thorne Cup Semifinal game, 3–4 vs. El Paso Rhinos
2014–15	46	10	33	3	23	158	265	1009	7th of 8, Western	Did not qualify
2015–16	52	22	27	3	47	198	221	1208	5th of 8, Western	Lost Div. Semifinals, 1–2 vs. Ontario Avalanche
2016–17	49	7	42	0	14	96	350	725	7th of 8, Western	Did not qualify
2017–18	51	23	26	2	48	171	240	786	5th of 6, Western	Won Div. Quarterfinals, 2–0 vs. Valencia Flyers; Lost Div. Semifinals, 1–2 vs. Long Beach Bombers
