= Valencia Flyers =

- City: Santa Clarita, California
- League: Western States Hockey League
- Division: Western
- Founded: 2001
- Home arena: Ice Station Valencia
- Colors: Navy blue, golden yellow, white
- Owner(s): Roger Perez
- Head coach: Shane McColgan

Franchise history
- 2001–2003: Valencia Flyers
- 2004–2007: Valencia Vipers
- 2007–2020: Valencia Flyers

The Valencia Flyers were an Amateur Athletic Union (AAU)-sanctioned junior ice hockey team based in Valencia, Santa Clarita, California. The team played in the Western Division of the Western States Hockey League at the Ice Station Valencia.

== History ==
The franchise was founded in 2001 as the Valencia Flyers in the Western States Hockey League (WSHL) with three other expansion franchises. The team played as the Flyers from 2001 to 2003 until suspending operations for the 2003–04 season before returning for the 2004–05 season as the Valencia Vipers. In 2007, the team reverted to its original name.

From 2001 to 2007, the Flyers were a USA Hockey-sanctioned Tier III Junior B team. In 2007, the WSHL was promoted to Tier III Junior A. Before the 2011–12 season, the WSHL and all its team members, including the Flyers, became AAU-sanctioned and dropped its USA Hockey sanctioning, the first Junior A hockey league to make that transition.

At the end of the 2019–20 regular season, the Flyers' home rink was closed due to the COVID-19 pandemic, the Ice Station Valencia, which was also owned by the Flyers' owner Roger Perez. The closure was made permanent due to the financial losses incurred by the shutdown, forcing the franchise to cease operations indefinitely.

== Season-by-season records ==
Season	GP	W	L	OTW	OTL	Pts	GF	GA	PIM	Finish	Playoffs
2010–11	46	18	25	—	3	39	133	174	—	5th of 8, Western; 9th of 13, WSHL	did not qualify
2011–12	46	23	17	—	6	52	181	163	1053	3rd of 6, Western; 8th of 16, WSHL	Won Div. Semifinals, 2–1 vs. San Diego Gulls; Lost Div. Finals, 1–2 vs. Fresno Monsters
2012–13	46	24	17	—	5	53	190	157	1140	3rd of 6, Western; 8th of 22, WSHL	Lost Div. Semifinals, 1–2 vs. Bay Area Seals
2013–14	46	27	15	—	4	58	171	175	750	3rd of 6, Pacific; 10th of 24, WSHL	Lost Div. Semifinals, 1–2 vs. Ontario Avalanche
2014–15	46	35	9	—	2	72	224	116	980	2nd of 8, Western; 5th of 28, WSHL	Div. Quarterfinals, Bye; Won Div. Semifinals, 2–1 vs. Ontario Avalanche; Lost Div. Finals, 1–2 vs. Fresno Monsters
2015–16	52	45	7	—	0	90	257	94	742	1st of 8, Western; 1st of 29, WSHL	Div. Quarterfinals, Bye; Won Div. Semifinals, 2–0 vs. Ontario Avalanche; Lost Div. Finals, 0–2 vs. Long Beach Bombers
2016–17	52	40	9	—	3	83	262	127	807	2nd of 8, Western; 4th of 27, WSHL	Div. Quarterfinals, Bye; Won Div. Semifinals, 2–0 vs. Ontario Avalanche; Lost Div. Finals, 0–2 vs. Long Beach Bombers; 1–1–1, 3rd of 6, Thorne Cup round-robin (as wild card) (W, 3–1 vs. Jr. Eagles; L, 1–3 vs. Jr. Steelheads; OTL, 2–3 vs. Bombers); Lost Thorne Cup Semifinal game, 1–3 vs. Idaho Jr. Steelheads
2017–18	51	25	22	—	4	54	242	215	731	4th of 6, Western; 13th of 23, WSHL	Lost Div. Quarterfinals, 0–2 vs. Phoenix Knights
2018–19	51	13	30	2	6	49 (Note: Beginning with the 2018–19 season, the WSHL began awarding 3pts for a win, 2pts for an overtime win, and 1pt for an overtime loss.)	194	259	862	5th of 5, Western; 17th of 23, WSHL	Lost Play-in series, 0–2 vs. Ontario Avalanche
2019–20	51	3	44	2	2	15	117	359	661	5th of 5, Western; 20th of 20, WSHL	did not qualify

== Alumni ==
The Flyers have had a number of alumni move on to NCAA Division III, and higher levels of junior ice hockey, and professional ice hockey.
