= Arizona Hawks (junior hockey) =

Ice hockey team in Peoria, Arizona

- City: Peoria, Arizona
- League: Western States Hockey League
- Division: Western
- Founded: 2009
- Home arena: AZ Ice Peoria
- Colors: Red, black, white
- Owner(s): Faceoff Enterprises, LLC (Greg Schursky)
- General manager: Greg Schursky
- Head coach: Jay Kouris

Franchise history
- 2009–2015: Arizona Redhawks
- 2015–2017: Arizona Hawks

The Arizona Hawks were an Amateur Athletic Union-sanctioned Tier II junior ice hockey team based out of Peoria, Arizona. Their host facility was AZ Ice Peoria located next to the Peoria Sports Complex, the spring training home of the Seattle Mariners and San Diego Padres of Major League Baseball. The team was a member of the Western States Hockey League in the Western Division. The team joined the league as an expansion team to start in the 2009–10 season. The players, ages 16–20, carried amateur status under Junior A guidelines and hoped to earn a spot on higher levels of junior ice hockey in the United States and Canada, collegiate, and eventually professional teams.

Luke Hernandez took over as head coach midway through the 2016–17 season. He remained in the role heading into the 2017–18 season but was replaced by Jay Kouris in August 2017.

After three games in the 2017–18 season, the team ceased operations.

== Season-by-season records ==
Season	GP	W	L	OTL	SOL	Pts	GF	GA	PIM	Regular season finish	Playoffs
2009–10	49	4	43	2	—	10	87	325	1459	8th of 8, Western	Did not qualify
2010–11	46	11	32	3	—	25	108	208	—	7th of 8, Western	Did not qualify
2011–12	46	22	20	3	1	48	163	191	971	4th of 6, Western	Lost Div. Semifinals, 0–2 vs. Fresno Monsters
2012–13	46	13	26	5	2	33	136	206	1037	6th of 6, Mountain	Did not qualify
2013–14	46	12	30	4	0	28	161	279	784	5th of 6, Mountain	Did not qualify
2014–15	46	3	42	0	1	7	78	300	899	8th of 8, Western	Did not qualify
2015–16	52	16	32	4	—	36	142	225	1452	6th of 8, Western	Lost Div. Quarterfinals, 0–2 vs. Fresno Monsters
2016–17	52	1	49	2	—	4	62	449	799	8th of 8, Western; 27th of 27, WSHL	Did not qualify
2017–18	3	0	3	0	—	0	10	40	50	Folded midseason	
