= 2013–14 ECHL season =

Ice hockey league season

- League: ECHL
- Sport: Ice hockey
- Duration: October 18, 2013 – April 13, 2014

Regular season
- Brabham Cup: Alaska Aces
- Season MVP: Mickey Lang (Orlando)
- Top scorer: Brandon Marino (Fort Wayne)

Playoffs
- Eastern champions: Cincinnati Cyclones
- Eastern runners-up: Greenville Road Warriors
- Western champions: Alaska Aces
- Western runners-up: Bakersfield Condors
- Playoffs MVP: Rob Madore (Cincinnati)

Kelly Cup
- Champions: Alaska Aces
- Runners-up: Cincinnati Cyclones

ECHL seasons
- ← 2012–13 2014–15 →

The 2013–14 ECHL season was the 26th season of the ECHL. The regular season schedule ran from October 18, 2013, to April 13, 2014, followed by the Kelly Cup playoffs. The league began the season with 22 teams scheduled to play 72 regular season games each, but one team folded during the season, which required the league to reschedule games in order to provide the remaining teams with full schedules.

== League business ==
=== Team changes ===
- The Trenton Titans ceased operations at the end of the 2012–13 season.
- The San Francisco Bulls ceased operations on January 27, 2014 after playing only 40 games of the season.

=== New affiliations and changes ===
ECHL team	Added affiliates	Lost affiliates
Alaska Aces	Calgary Flames (NHL); Abbotsford Heat (AHL)	Independent
Bakersfield Condors	Edmonton Oilers (NHL); Oklahoma City Barons (AHL)	Independent
Colorado Eagles	Independent	Winnipeg Jets (NHL); St. John's IceCaps (AHL)
Evansville IceMen		St. Louis Blues (NHL); Peoria Rivermen (AHL)
Fort Wayne Komets	Independent	Anaheim Ducks (NHL); Norfolk Admirals (AHL)
Greenville Road Warriors	Philadelphia Flyers (NHL); Hartford Wolf Pack (AHL); Adirondack Phantoms (AHL)	Connecticut Whale (AHL)
Kalamazoo Wings	Utica Comets (AHL)	Chicago Wolves (AHL)
Ontario Reign	Winnipeg Jets (NHL); St. John's IceCaps	
Orlando Solar Bears	Toronto Maple Leafs (NHL); Toronto Marlies (AHL)	
Stockton Thunder	New York Islanders (NHL); Bridgeport Sound Tigers (AHL)	Edmonton Oilers (NHL); Oklahoma City Barons (AHL)
Utah Grizzlies	Anaheim Ducks (NHL); Norfolk Admirals (AHL)	Calgary Flames (NHL); Abbotsford Heat (AHL)

=== Annual Board of Governors meeting ===
The ECHL Board of Governors was held the first week of July 2013 in Las Vegas, Nevada where the Board of Governors re-elected Gwinnett Gladiators president Steve Chapman as chairman for an eighth term and awarded the 2015 All-star game to the Orlando Solar Bears.

== Regular season ==
=== Conference standings ===
Eastern Conference	GP	W	L	OTL	SOL	GF	GA	PTS
z-Reading Royals (WAS)	72	46	22	2	2	229	182	96
y-Kalamazoo Wings (STL/VAN)	72	42	22	3	5	224	197	92
y-South Carolina Stingrays (BOS)	72	43	23	2	4	197	173	92
x-Orlando Solar Bears (MIN/TOR)	72	43	24	2	3	225	219	91
x-Cincinnati Cyclones (FLA/NSH)	72	41	23	4	4	247	204	90
x-Wheeling Nailers (MTL/PIT)	72	39	27	1	5	216	196	84
x-Greenville Road Warriors (NYR)	72	39	27	2	4	220	208	84
x-Fort Wayne Komets (Ind.)	72	36	24	7	5	215	215	84
e-Florida Everblades (CAR/TB)	72	37	27	3	5	240	222	82
e-Evansville IceMen (CBJ)	72	31	30	4	7	226	237	73
e-Gwinnett Gladiators (PHX)	72	29	38	3	2	203	227	63
e-Elmira Jackals (OTT/NJ)	72	24	40	3	5	176	252	56
e-Toledo Walleye (CHI/DET)	72	21	44	4	3	193	268	49

x - clinched playoff spot, y - clinched division title, z - clinched best conference record, e - eliminated from playoff contention

Western Conference	GP	W	L	OTL	SOL	GF	GA	PTS
b-Alaska Aces (CGY)	71	45	19	3	4	243	164	97
y-Ontario Reign (LA/WPG)	71	44	20	3	4	215	191	95
x-Utah Grizzlies (ANA)	71	38	24	3	6	187	173	85
x-Idaho Steelheads (DAL)	72	39	26	3	4	223	212	85
x-Colorado Eagles (Ind.)	71	33	26	7	5	211	218	78
x-Bakersfield Condors (EDM)	72	36	30	2	4	197	202	78
x-Stockton Thunder (NYI)	72	33	31	2	6	224	235	74
x-Las Vegas Wranglers (Ind.)	72	20	44	4	4	174	248	48
w-San Francisco Bulls (SJ)	40	15	20	4	1	101	143	35

x - clinched playoff spot, y - clinched division title, b - clinched Brabham Cup, best record in the conference and first round bye, e - eliminated from playoff contention, w - ceased operations

=== Divisional standings ===
Eastern Conference

Atlantic Division	GP	W	L	OTL	SOL	GF	GA	PTS
z-Reading Royals	72	46	22	2	2	229	182	96
x-Wheeling Nailers	72	39	27	1	5	216	196	84
e-Elmira Jackals	72	24	40	3	5	176	252	56

North Division	GP	W	L	OTL	SOL	GF	GA	PTS
y-Kalamazoo Wings	72	42	22	3	5	224	197	92
x-Cincinnati Cyclones	72	41	23	4	4	247	204	90
x-Fort Wayne Komets	72	36	24	7	5	215	215	84
e-Evansville IceMen	72	31	30	4	7	226	237	73
e-Toledo Walleye	72	21	44	4	3	193	268	49

South Division	GP	W	L	OTL	SOL	GF	GA	PTS
y-South Carolina Stingrays	72	43	23	2	4	197	173	92
x-Orlando Solar Bears	72	43	24	2	3	225	219	91
x-Greenville Road Warriors	72	39	27	2	4	220	208	84
e-Florida Everblades	72	37	27	3	5	240	222	82
e-Gwinnett Gladiators	72	29	38	3	2	203	227	63

x - clinched playoff spot, y - clinched division title, e - eliminated from playoff contention

Western Conference

Mountain Division	GP	W	L	OTL	SOL	GF	GA	PTS
b-Alaska Aces	71	45	19	3	4	243	164	97
x-Utah Grizzlies	71	38	24	3	6	187	173	85
x-Idaho Steelheads	72	39	26	3	4	223	212	85
x-Colorado Eagles	71	33	26	7	5	211	218	78

Pacific Division	GP	W	L	OTL	SOL	GF	GA	PTS
y-Ontario Reign	71	44	20	3	4	215	191	95
x-Bakersfield Condors	72	36	30	2	4	197	202	78
x-Stockton Thunder	72	33	31	2	6	224	235	74
x-Las Vegas Wranglers	72	20	44	4	4	174	248	48
w-San Francisco Bulls	40	15	20	4	1	101	143	35

x - clinched playoff spot, y - clinched division title, b - clinched Brabham Cup, best record in the conference and first round bye, e - eliminated from playoff contention, w - ceased operations

== Postseason ==
Conference quarterfinals	Conference semifinals
1	Reading Royals	1
8	Fort Wayne Komets	4
8	Fort Wayne	2
5	Cincinnati	4
4	Orlando Solar Bears	2
5	Cincinnati Cyclones	4
Eastern Conference
2	Kalamazoo Wings	2
7	Greenville Road Warriors	4
7	Greenville	4
6	Wheeling	2
3	South Carolina Stingrays	0
6	Wheeling Nailers	4
1	Alaska Aces	4
8	Las Vegas Wranglers	0
1	Alaska	4
4	Idaho	1
4	Idaho Steelheads	4
5	Colorado Eagles	2
Western Conference
2	Ontario Reign	0
7	Stockton Thunder	4
7	Stockton	1
6	Bakersfield	4
3	Utah Grizzlies	1
6	Bakersfield Condors	4

Conference finals
5	Cincinnati	4
7	Greenville	2
1	Alaska	4
6	Bakersfield	2

Kelly Cup finals
5	Cincinnati	2
1	Alaska	4

== See also ==
- ECHL All-Star Game
- List of ECHL seasons
- 2013 in sports
- 2014 in sports
