= Fresno Monsters =

- City: Fresno, California
- League: United States Premier Hockey League NCDC
- Conference: West
- Division: Pacific
- Founded: 2009
- Home arena: Gateway Ice Center
- Colors: Black, green
- Owners: Fresno Indoor Sports (Thomas Hancock, owner)
- Head coach: Daylon Mannon

Franchise history
- WSHL/USPHL franchise
- 2009–present: Fresno Monsters
- NAHL franchise
- 2010–2013: Fresno Monsters
- 2013–2023: Wenatchee Wild

The Fresno Monsters are a junior ice hockey team based in Fresno, California. The team is a member of the United States Premier Hockey League (USPHL) NCDC Division. The Monsters' home venue is Gateway Ice Center.

== History ==
The Monsters were announced in spring 2009, filling a void for hockey in Fresno after the Fresno Falcons folded. The team began play in mid-September 2009, playing in the Tier III Jr. A Western States Hockey League (WSHL). On December 15, 2009, the Monsters announced the organization was given expansion approval into the Tier II North American Hockey League (NAHL) for the 2010–11 season and Fresno would host two levels of junior hockey for the first time. On May 23, 2013, it was revealed the Monsters' North American Hockey League franchise would move to Wenatchee, Washington, and become the second Wenatchee Wild. The Monsters would continue to field a team in the Western States Hockey League, now sanctioned under United Hockey Union (UHU) instead of USA Hockey, with the same ownership of David White and Shoot the Puck, Inc. In 2015, the UHU promoted the WSHL and Monsters to their own level of Tier II.

On March 22, 2016, after six seasons coaching the WSHL Monsters, head coach and general manager Bryce Dale stepped down from his positions with the organization. In June 2016, David White sold the Monsters to the Central Valley Community Sports Foundation, led by Jeff Blair. Former Monsters' assistant coach, Jason Rivera, was then named head coach but was replaced by former NHL enforcer, Kevin "Killer" Kaminski prior to the season. In January 2018, the team announced it would begin to occasionally play games again at the larger Selland Arena, their home while the organization also had a NAHL franchise. The following season, the Monsters moved back to Selland Arena for 21 of their 23 scheduled home games. After three seasons, coach Kaminski left to become the head coach of the La Ronge Ice Wolves in his home province of Saskatchewan. He was replaced by Trevor Karasiewicz from the Watertown Wolves in the Federal Hockey League.

In 2020, the Monsters left the WSHL and joined another independent junior hockey league, the United States Premier Hockey League (USPHL), in the Premier Division.

== Season-by-season records ==
=== WSHL/USPHL team (2009–present) ===
Season	GP	W	L	OTW	OTL	Pts	GF	GA	PIM	Finish	Playoffs
2009–10	49	41	5	—	3	85	264	94	1,516	1st of 8, Western	Won Div. Semifinals vs. San Diego Gulls; Lost Div. Finals, 1–2 vs. Phoenix Polar Bears
2010–11	46	36	8	—	2	74	220	119	1,233	2nd of 8, Western	Lost Div. Semifinals vs. Phoenix Polar Bears
2011–12	46	43	2	—	1	87	264	93	1,281	1st of 6, Western; 1st of 16, WSHL	Won Div. Semifinals, 2–0 vs. Arizona RedHawks; Won Div. Finals, 2–1 vs. Valencia Flyers; 0–3–0 in Thorne Cup Finals Round Robin (L, 1–3 vs. Jr. Steelheads; L, 3–6 vs. Ice Jets; L, 2–3 vs. Rhinos)
2012–13	46	32	13	—	1	65	208	114	1,326	1st of 6, Western; 4th of 22, WSHL	Won Div. Semifinals, 2–0 vs. San Diego Gulls; Lost Div. Finals, 1–2 vs. Bay Area Seals; 0–2–0 in Thorne Cup Finals Round Robin (wild card) (L, 3–4 vs. Jr. Steelheads; L, 3–8 vs. Rhinos)
2013–14	46	37	5	—	4	78	240	122	1,367	1st of 6, Western; 3rd of 24, WSHL	Won Div. Semifinals, 2–0 vs. Long Beach Bombers; Won Div. Finals, 2–0 vs. Ontario Avalanche; 2–1–0 in Thorne Cup Finals Round Robin (W, 6–3 vs. Jr. Brahmas; OTW, 4–3 vs. Jr. Steelheads; L, 1–3 vs. Knights); Lost Thorne Cup Semifinal game, 2–3 vs. Idaho Jr. Steelheads
2014–15	46	38	7	—	1	77	301	94	1,257	1st of 8, Western; 3rd of 28, WSHL	Div. Quarterfinals, Bye; Won Div. Semifinals, 2–0 vs. San Diego Gulls; Won Div. Finals, 2–1 vs. Valencia Flyers; Lost Conf. Finals, 0–2 vs. Idaho Jr. Steelheads
2015–16	52	36	12	—	4	76	267	147	1,214	3rd of 8, Western; 9th of 29, WSHL	Won Div. Quarterfinals, 2–0 vs. Arizona Hawks; Lost Div. Semifinals, 0–2 vs. Long Beach Bombers
2016–17	52	25	22	—	5	55	224	237	1,084	5th of 8, Western; 16th of 27, WSHL	Lost Div. Quarterfinals, 0–2 vs. Las Vegas Storm
2017–18	51	33	17	—	1	67	298	189	1,255	3rd of 6, Western; 9th of 23, WSHL	Won Div. Quarterfinals, 2–0 vs. San Diego Sabers; Won Div. Semifinals, 2–1 vs. Ontario Avalanche; Lost Div. Finals, 0–2 vs. Long Beach Bombers
2018–19	51	31	16	3	1	100 (Note: Beginning with the 2018–19 season, the WSHL awarded 3pts for a win, 2pts for an overtime win, and 1pt for an overtime loss.)	227	172	1,248	2nd of 5, Western; 9th of 23, WSHL	Won Div. Semifinals. 2–0 vs. San Diego Sabers; Lost Div. Finals, 1–2 vs. Long Beach Bombers
2019–20	51	34	13	2	2	108	294	141	793	1st of 5, Western; 6th of 20, WSHL	Playoffs cancelled
2020–21	40	28	10	—	2	58	227	124	983	1st of 5, Pacific; 18th of 62, USPHL-Premier	Won Div. Semifinal game, 6–2 vs. San Diego Sabers; Won Division Championship game, 7–2 vs. Las Vegas Thunderbirds; 1–2–0 USPHL Premier Nationals round-robin Pool D (L, 6–8 vs. Jr. Hurricanes; L, 2–7 vs. Cherokee; W, 8–6 vs. Moose)
2021–22	44	30	11	—	3	63	307	163	1002	1st of 6, Pacific; 13th of 64; USPHL-Premier	Won Div. Semifinal, 2–0 vs. Ontario Jr. Reign; Won Div. Finals, 2–0 vs. Las Vegas Thunderbirds; 0–1–2 USPHL Premier Nationals round-robin Pool D (L, 2–4 vs. Blue Ox; SOL, 4–5 vs. Cherokee; OTL, 4–5 vs. Generals)
2022–23	46	38	7	—	1	77	269	129	1106	1st of 7, Pacific; 6th of 69; USPHL-Premier	Won Div. Semifinal, 2–0 vs. San Diego Sabers; Lost Div. Finals, 0–2 vs. Las Vegas Thunderbirds
2023–24	46	39	5	—	2	80	345	130	848	1st of 7, Pacific; 2nd of 61; USPHL-Premier	Won Div. Semifinal, 2–0 vs. Bakersfield Roughnecks; Lost Div. Finals, 2-3 vs. Ontario Jr. Reign
2024–25	46	37	9	—	-	74	270	127	660	1st of 8, Pacific; 9th of 71; USPHL-Premier	Won Div. Semifinal, 2–0 vs. Henderson Force; Won Div. Finals, 2-0 Ontario Jr. Reign; Divisional Round Robin 1 - 2 (L 5-8 Islanders)(W 4-3 Springfield)(L 4-5 Tampa Bay); 5th of 6 Pool 1 - eliminated
2025–26	46	37	8	1	-	75	282	119	1030	1st of 7, Pacific; 4th of 77; USPHL-Premier	Won Div. Semifinal, 2–0 vs. Ventura Vikings; Lost Div. Finals, 1-2 Ontario Jr. Reign

=== North American Hockey League team (2010–2013) ===
Season	GP	W	L	OTL	Pts	GF	GA	PIM	Finish	Playoffs
2010–11	58	19	34	5	43	158	243	1,635	6th of 6, West t-22nd of 26, NAHL	did not qualify
2011–12	60	27	23	10	64	167	179	1,454	5th of 6, West t-17th of 28, NAHL	did not qualify
2012–13	60	18	35	7	43	139	224	1,115	4th of 4, West; 22nd of 24, NAHL	Lost Div. Semifinal series, 2–3 vs. Wenatchee Wild
