= San Diego Sabers =

- City: Carlsbad, California
- League: United States Premier Hockey League
- Founded: 2001
- Home arena: Carlsbad Icetown
- Colors: Gold, black, white
- Owner: Tomas Kapusta
- General manager: Tomas Kapusta
- Head coach: Domenic DiCicco

Franchise history
- 2001–2008: San Diego Surf
- 2008–2015: San Diego Gulls
- 2015–present: San Diego Sabers

The San Diego Sabers are a junior ice hockey team based in Carlsbad, California, that competes in the United States Premier Hockey League (USPHL). The team plays its home games at IceTown Carlsbad. The team was the fourth to be known as the San Diego Gulls, using the name from 2008 to 2015, when it was given to the American Hockey League (AHL) San Diego Gulls before the 2015–16 season.

== History ==
The franchise was founded in 2001 as the San Diego Surf. At the time, the Western States Hockey League (WSHL) was a Tier III Junior B league before later transitioning to a Junior A in 2007. It played as the Surf from 2001 until 2008 when the team took the name San Diego Gulls, the name of three former hockey franchises in San Diego.

Prior to the 2011–12 season, the WSHL and all its team members, including the Gulls, became Amateur Athletic Union sanctioned instead of USA Hockey, the first Junior A hockey league to make that transition.

In February 2015, it was announced that the team has changed its name to San Diego Sabers for the 2015–16 season as the San Diego Gulls name would be used by the new San Diego AHL team.

In 2017, the Sabers were sold to former Czech national team and Olympian Tomas Kapusta.

In 2020, the Sabers left the WSHL and joined another independent junior hockey league, the United States Premier Hockey League (USPHL), in the Premier Division. The team also relocated from Iceplex Escondido in Escondido, California, to Carlsbad Icetown in Carlsbad, California.

== Season-by-season records ==
Season	GP	W	L	OTW	OTL	Pts	GF	GA	PIM	Finish	Playoffs
2010–11	46	23	22	—	1	47	141	151	—	4th of 8, Western; 7th of 13, WSHL	Lost div. semifinals, 0–2 vs. Idaho Jr. Steelheads
2011–12	46	24	17	—	5	53	181	132	851	2nd of 6, Western; 7th of 16, WSHL	Lost div. semifinals, 0–2 vs. Valencia Flyers
2012–13	46	24	18	—	4	52	173	131	620	4th of 6, Western; 10th of 22, WSHL	Lost div. semifinals, 0–2 vs. Valencia Flyers
2013–14	46	8	35	—	3	19	142	226	837	6th of 6, Western; 21st of 24, WSHL	Did not qualify
2014–15	46	15	29	—	2	32	146	208	998	6th of 8, Western; 22nd of 28, WSHL	Won div. quarterfinals, 2–1 vs. Long Beach Bombers; Lost div. semifinals, 0–2 vs. Fresno Monsters
2015–16	52	9	40	—	3	21	110	275	1015	8th of 8, Western; 27th of 29, WSHL	Did not qualify
2016–17	52	24	25	—	3	51	189	213	832	6th of 8, Western; 17th of 27, WSHL	Lost div. quarterfinals, 0–2 vs. Ontario Avalanche
2017–18	51	5	42	—	4	14	112	312	558	6th of 6, Western; 21st of 23, WSHL	Lost div. quarterfinals, 0–2 vs. Fresno Monsters
2018–19	51	17	27	4	3	62 (Note: Beginning with the 2018–19 season, the WSHL awarded 3pts for a win, 2pts for an overtime win, and 1pt for an overtime loss.)	187	228	965	3rd of 5, Western; 13th of 23, WSHL	Lost div. semifinals, 0–2 vs. Fresno Monsters
2019–20	51	31	18	1	1	96	180	145	777	2nd of 5, Western; 8th of 20, WSHL	Playoffs cancelled
2020–21	43	3	39	—	1	7	81	269	1096	4th of 5, Pacific; 60th of 62, Premier	Lost div. semifinal game, 2–6 vs. Fresno Monsters
2021–22	44	17	23	—	4	38	154	187	712	4th of 6, Pacific; 46th of 65, Premier	Did not qualify
2022-23	46	33	11	1	2	68	212	124	948	4th of 7, Pacific; 17th of 69, Premier	Lost div. Semifinal, 0-1-1 vs. Fresno Monsters
2023-24	46	15	31	1	0	31	212	248	943	6th of 7, Pacific; 17th of 69, Premier	Did not qualify
2024-25	46	23	22	1	0	47	188	184	800	5th of 8, Pacific; 45th of 71, Premier	Did not qualify
2025-26	46	13	31	1	1	28	124	208	869	6th of 7, Pacific; 59th of 77, Premier	Did not qualify

== Previous logos ==
Team logo when the franchise played as the San Diego Gulls 2008–15.

Team logo when the franchise played as the San Diego Surf 2001–08.

== Alumni ==
The Sabers have had a number of alumni move on to college ice hockey, higher levels of junior ice hockey, and professional ice hockey.

- David Brito — San Diego Gulls (ECHL), US National Inline Hockey Team
- Ted Lauer (2014–15) — Lake Forest College Lake Forest, Illinois, NCAA Division III
- Cameron Todd (2014–15) — NACKA HK Team A, Sweden
