= Texas Renegades (ice hockey) =

The Texas Renegades were a Junior A Tier III ice hockey team, based in North Richland Hills, Texas. Initially joining the league as the Cajun Catahoulas, the team moved in for the 2008–09 season to North Richland Hills, Texas to become the Texas Renegades. The team lasted in North Richland Hills for one season before moving on to Rio Rancho, New Mexico to become the New Mexico Renegades.

Season	GP	W	L	OTL	Pts	GF	GA	PIM	Regular season finish	Playoffs
2008–09	49	12	37	0	24	123	289	1354	5th of 6, Midwest	Did not qualify
