= Western States Hockey League =

Amateur ice hockey league

- Sport: Hockey
- Founded: 1993
- Folded: 2022
- Commissioner: Ron White
- Country: Canada; United States
- Most titles: Phoenix Polar Bears (7)
- Website: WSHL.org

The Western States Hockey League (WSHL) was a junior ice hockey league established in 1993. It was sanctioned by the United Hockey Union, the junior hockey branch of the Amateur Athletic Union. Previously, it was sanctioned by USA Hockey from 1994 to 2011. Teams played approximately 50 games in the regular season schedule, mimicking what players would experience at the collegiate level. As of January 2022, there are no active teams in the league following the creation of the Can-Am Junior Hockey League by former WSHL teams.

== History ==
Year one consisted of six teams, spanning Arizona, California, Nevada, and Utah, with all member clubs playing a 30-game schedule and operating as Tier III Junior B teams. The league was founded by Dr. Don Thorne and the Thorne Cup championship trophy was named in his recognition. The Anaheim Jr. Ducks won the first Thorne Cup Championship that season and was the last franchise from the inaugural season still in existence as the Long Beach Bombers until 2019. The Long Beach franchise was sold and the Bombers brand was then used as an expansion team called the Barrhead Bombers.

Current commissioner Ron White took over operation of the WSHL in 1995 and continued to expand the league footprint. In 2007, the WSHL upgraded their league status from the Tier III Junior B level to Junior A to attract higher quality prospects.

In 2011, the league joined the Amateur Athletic Union (AAU) and dropped its USA Hockey sanctioning leading to the loss of its most successful franchise, the Phoenix Polar Bears, while adding many new teams. After the WSHL's success without USA Hockey, the United Hockey Union (UHU) was formed under the AAU sanctioning along with the Northern States Hockey League (NSHL) and the Midwest Junior Hockey League (MWJHL). The UHU leagues continued to operate with Tier III Junior A player requirements.

The WSHL has had numerous teams participate in and win the USA Hockey and UHU National Championship over the years. Most recently, the El Paso Rhinos were crowned the United Hockey Union National Champions in 2014. The WSHL has had great success in moving players on to the college hockey ranks through the "Western States Shootout", an annual all-league showcase held every December in Las Vegas, Nevada. The event averages in excess of 80 scouts in attendance, all of whom are looking to bolster their roster for the following season.

In 2015, the WSHL Board of Governors announced the approval of the league to start competing as a Tier II-level player league for a higher caliber of play beginning in the 2015–16 season. Prior to the announcement the only Tier II-level league in the United States was the North American Hockey League. However, unlike the USA Hockey-sanctioned Tier II NAHL, the UHU-sanctioned WSHL operates similarly to the Canadian Junior Hockey League's Junior "A" status and continues to charge player tuition to help pay for team travel expenses. In the 2015–16 season, the WSHL grew to its largest membership with 29 teams across 14 states. In 2018, the league expanded into western Canada with a Provinces Division in the WSHL that had originally been announced to play as its own league called the Western Provinces Hockey Association (WPHA). After one season, the WSHL's association with the WPHA dissolved and removed the teams that had been directly operated by the owners of the WPHA. The WPHA then joined the Greater Metro Junior A Hockey League, an independent junior league primarily based in Ontario.

In April 2020, the WSHL lost the Fresno Monsters, Las Vegas Thunderbirds, Northern Colorado Eagles, Ogden Mustangs, Ontario Avalanche, Pueblo Bulls, San Diego Sabers, Southern Oregon Spartans, and the Utah Outliers to the United States Premier Hockey League, another independent junior hockey organization. The Oklahoma City Jr. Blazers then left on May 19, 2020, to join to the North American 3 Hockey League (NA3HL). On May 26, 2020, the WSHL announced it would be dormant for the 2020–21 season due to the on-going COVID-19 pandemic, stating the league was already they have begun preparing to return for the 2021–22 season. In June 2020, the El Paso Rhinos also left for the NA3HL for the 2020–21 season with the intention of joining the NAHL for the 2021–22 season.

In January 2021, the league stated that it still intended to return for a 2021–22 season. In August, the league gave an update with six new teams and five returning teams split into two divisions: Northwest and Provincial. The schedule was released in September and the league had lost the Vancouver Devils expansion team. The season started the last weekend of October and the expansion Utah Altitude folded after one game played. By November 5, the Northwest Division was announced as going dormant for the season with no games played by Bellingham, Rogue Valley, or Seattle. Bellingham and Vernal then joined the Provincial Division, but Bellingham withdrew after playing five games. By January 2022, the six remaining teams left the WSHL and started another league called the Can-Am Junior Hockey League (CAJHL) to finish the season independently.

== Champions ==
Season	Thorne Cup champion	Runner-up	National Tournament result
1994–95	Anaheim Jr. Ducks		
1995–96	Anaheim Jr. Ducks		
1996–97	Flagstaff Mountaineers		
1997–98	Flagstaff Mountaineers		
1998–99	Ventura Mariners		
1999–00	Ventura Mariners		Tier III Junior B National Champions
2000–01	Ventura Mariners		
2001–02	Phoenix Polar Bears	Utah Valley Golden Eagles	Tier III Junior B National runner-up
2002–03	Phoenix Polar Bears		Tier III Junior B National Champion
2003–04	Phoenix Polar Bears		
2004–05	Phoenix Polar Bears		
2005–06	Fort Worth Texans	Phoenix Polar Bears	
2006–07	Phoenix Polar Bears	El Paso Rhinos	
2007–08	El Paso Rhinos	Phoenix Polar Bears	
2008–09	Phoenix Polar Bears	El Paso Rhinos	
2009–10	Phoenix Polar Bears	Boulder Bison	
2010–11	Idaho Jr. Steelheads	El Paso Rhinos	Tier III Junior A National runner-up (Rhinos)
2011–12	Idaho Jr. Steelheads	Dallas Ice Jets	
2012–13	Idaho Jr. Steelheads	Bay Area Seals	UHU National Champion (Steelheads)
2013–14	El Paso Rhinos	Idaho Jr. Steelheads	UHU National Champion (Rhinos)
2014–15	Idaho Jr. Steelheads	El Paso Rhinos	No National Championship competed this year
2015–16	Idaho Jr. Steelheads	Colorado Jr. Eagles	No National Championship competed this year
2016–17	Wichita Jr. Thunder	Idaho Jr. Steelheads	No National Championship competed this year
2017–18	El Paso Rhinos	Ogden Mustangs	No National Championship competed this year
2018–19	El Paso Rhinos	Ogden Mustangs	No National Championship competed this year
2019–20	Not awarded due to the COVID-19 pandemic		No National Championship competed this year

== Team history ==
Full list of teams that have played in the WSHL.

- Anaheim Junior Ducks – (Anaheim, California) 1994–1996 → Southern California Jr. Bombers
- Arizona Bandits – (Phoenix, Arizona) 1994–1995
- Las Vegas Junior Aces – (Las Vegas, Nevada) 1994–1995 → Las Vegas Jr. Thunder
- San Jose Junior Sharks – (San Jose, California) 1994–1996
- Utah Lightning – (Salt Lake City, Utah) 1994–1996 → Utah Jr. Grizzlies
- Ventura Mariners – (Simi Valley, California) 1994–2001
- Las Vegas Junior Thunder – (Las Vegas, Nevada) 1995–1996
- Alaska Arctic Ice – (Anchorage, Alaska) 1996–1999
- Flagstaff Mountaineers – (Flagstaff, Arizona) 1996–1999
- New Mexico Ice Breakers – (Albuquerque, New Mexico) 1996–2001
- Southern California Junior Bombers – (Lakewood, California) 1996–2006 → Bay City Bombers
- Utah Junior Grizzlies – (Salt Lake City, Utah) 1996–2001 → Salt Lake Maple Leafs
- Colorado Cougars – (Denver, Colorado) 1997–1999
- Fairbanks Ice Dogs – (Fairbanks, Alaska) 1997–1999
- Las Vegas Bandits – (Las Vegas, Nevada) 1997–1998
- Peninsula Hellfighters – (Kenai Peninsula, Alaska) 1997–1999
- Sinbad Sailors – (Anchorage, Alaska) 1997–1999
- Utah Valley Golden Eagles – (Provo, Utah) 1997–2002
- Las Vegas Blackjacks – (Las Vegas, Nevada) 1998–1999
- Nevada Gamblers – (Las Vegas, Nevada) 1998–2000
- Yukon Claim Jumpers – (Whitehorse, Yukon) 1998–1999
- Phoenix Polar Bears – (Phoenix, Arizona) 1999–2011 → Phoenix Knights
- Las Vegas Outlaws – (Las Vegas, Nevada) 2000–2001
- Nevada Rattlers – (Las Vegas, Nevada) 2001–2003
- Salt Lake Maple Leafs – (Salt Lake City, Utah) 2001–2002 → Salt Lake Jr. Grizzlies
- San Diego Surf – (San Diego, California) 2001–2008 → San Diego Gulls
- Valencia Flyers – (Valencia, California) 2001–2003 → Valencia Vipers – 2003–2009 → Valencia Flyers – 2009–2020
- Capital Thunder – (Roseville, California) 2002–2004, 2005–2009
- Salt Lake Junior Grizzlies – (Salt Lake City, Utah) 2002–04
- Bazooka Blues – (Tulsa, Oklahoma) 2004–2006 → Tulsa Rampage
- Dallas Titans – (Dallas, Texas) 2004–2006
- Idaho Rattlers – (Boise, Idaho) 2004–2006
- Valencia Vipers – (Valencia, California) 2004–2009 → Valencia Flyers
- Cajun Catahoulas – (Lafayette, Louisiana) 2005–2008 → Texas Renegades
- Fort Worth Texans – (Fort Worth, Texas) 2005–2006
- Peoria Coyotes – (Peoria, Arizona) 2005–2007
- San Antonio Diablos – (San Antonio, Texas) 2005–2010
- Bay City Bombers – (Lakewood, California) 2006–2010 → Long Beach Bombers
- Dallas Hawks – (Addison, Texas) 2006–2009
- El Paso Rhinos – (El Paso, Texas) 2006–2020
- Long Beach Bulldogs – (Lakewood, California) 2006–2007
- Tucson Tilt – (Tucson, Arizona) 2006–2007
- Tulsa Rampage – (Tulsa, Oklahoma) 2006–2011 → Cheyenne Stampede
- Colorado Outlaws – (Westminster, Colorado) 2007–2009 → Boulder Jr. Bison
- San Diego Gulls – (Escondido, California) 2008–2015 → San Diego Sabers
- Texas Renegades – (Dallas, Texas) 2008–2009 → New Mexico Renegades
- Arizona RedHawks – (Peoria, Arizona) 2009–2015 → Arizona Hawks
- Bakersfield Junior Condors – (Bakersfield, California) 2009–2011 → Ogden Mustangs
- Boulder Junior Bison – (Superior, Colorado) 2009–2014 → Colorado RoughRiders
- Fresno Monsters – (Fresno, California) 2009–2020 (joined USPHL)
- Idaho Junior Steelheads – (Boise/McCall, Idaho) 2009–2017 → Idaho IceCats
- New Mexico Renegades – (Rio Rancho, New Mexico) 2009–2014 → Springfield Express
- Long Beach Bombers – (Lakewood, California) 2010–2019 → Barrhead Bombers
- Texas Junior Brahmas – (North Richland Hills, Texas) 2010–2014
- Cheyenne Stampede – (Cheyenne, Wyoming) 2011–2019
- Dallas Ice Jets – (Grapevine, Texas) 2011–2014
- Dallas Snipers – (Euless, Texas) 2011–2020
- Park City Moose – (Park City, Utah) 2011–2012 → Salt Lake City Moose
- Phoenix Knights – (Gilbert, Arizona) 2011–2018
- Ogden Mustangs – (Ogden, Utah) 2011–2020 (joined USPHL)
- Bay Area Seals – (Daly City, California) 2012–2013 → Lake Tahoe Blue
- Ontario Avalanche – (Ontario, California) 2012–2020 (joined USPHL as Anaheim Avalanche)
- Salt Lake City Moose – (Salt Lake City/West Valley City, Utah) 2012–2016 → Utah Outliers
- Seattle Totems – (Mountlake Terrace, Washington) 2012–2021 (joined USPHL)
- Southern Oregon Spartans – (Medford, Oregon) 2012–2020 (joined USPHL)
- Tulsa Junior Oilers – (Tulsa, Oklahoma) 2012–2017
- Wichita Junior Thunder – (Wichita, Kansas) 2012–2020
- Colorado Junior Eagles – (Fort Collins, Colorado) 2013–2018 → Northern Colorado Eagles
- Lake Tahoe Blue – (South Lake Tahoe, California) 2013–2015 → Tahoe Icemen
- Missoula Maulers – (Missoula, Montana) 2013–2016
- Butte Cobras – (Butte, Montana) 2014–2017
- Casper Coyotes – (Casper, Wyoming) 2014–2018 → Casper Bobcats
- Colorado Evolution – (Denver, Colorado) 2014–2016
- Colorado RoughRiders – (Superior, Colorado) 2014–2015 → Superior RoughRiders
- Las Vegas Storm – (Las Vegas, Nevada) 2014–2017
- Oklahoma City Jr. Blazers – (Oklahoma City, Oklahoma) 2014–2020 (joined NA3HL)
- Springfield Express – (Springfield, Missouri) 2014–2018
- Whitefish Wolverines – (Whitefish, Montana) 2014–2016
- Arizona Hawks – (Peoria, Arizona) 2015–2017
- San Diego Sabers – (Escondido, California) 2015–2020 (joined USPHL)
- Superior RoughRiders – (Superior, Colorado) 2015–2018
- Tahoe Icemen – (South Lake Tahoe, California) 2015–2018
- Vancouver Rangers – (Vancouver, Washington) 2015–2017 → West Sound Warriors
- Bellingham Blazers – (Bellingham, Washington) 2016–2021 (joined USPHL)
- Utah Outliers – (West Valley City, Utah) 2016–2020 (joined USPHL)
- Vail Powder Hounds – (Vail, Colorado) 2016 (Originally joined as the Breckenridge Bucks from the RMJHL but had to relocate to Vail and then folded midseason.)
- Idaho IceCats – (McCall, Idaho) 2017–2018
- West Sound Warriors – (Bremerton, Washington) 2017–2018 → West Sound Admirals
- Casper Bobcats – (Casper, Wyoming) 2018–2019
- Cold Lake Wings – (Cold Lake, Alberta) 2018–2019 (Western Provinces Hockey Association)
- Edson Aeros – (Edson, Alberta) 2018–2021(from Western Provinces Hockey Association) → Cold Lake Aeros
- Hinton Wildcats – (Hinton, Alberta) 2018–2019 (Western Provinces Hockey Association)
- Meadow Lake Mustangs – (Meadow Lake, Saskatchewan) 2018–2020 (from Western Provinces Hockey Association)
- Northern Colorado Eagles – (Greeley, Colorado) 2018–2020 (joined USPHL)
- Steamboat Wranglers – (Steamboat Springs, Colorado) 2018–2019
- West Sound Admirals – (Bremerton, Washington) 2018–2019
- Barrhead Bombers – (Barrhead, Alberta) First franchise: 2019–2021 → Rogue Valley Royals; Second franchise: 2021–2022 (joined CAJHL)
- Cold Lake Hornets – (Cold Lake, Alberta) 2019–2020
- Hinton Timberwolves – (Hinton, Alberta) 2019–2022 (joined CAJHL)
- Las Vegas Thunderbirds – (Las Vegas, Nevada) 2019–2020 (joined USPHL)
- Pueblo Bulls – (Pueblo, Colorado) 2019–2020 (joined USPHL)
- Cold Lake Aeros – (Cold Lake, Alberta) 2021–2022 (joined CAJHL)
- Edmonton Eagles – Enoch, Alberta) 2021–2022 (joined CAJHL)
- Rogue Valley Royals – (Medford, Oregon) (Never played in the WSHL; joined USPHL in 2022)
- Utah Altitude – (Kearns, Utah) 2021
- Vegreville Vipers – (Vegreville, Alberta) 2021–2022 (joined CAJHL)
- Vernal Oilers – (Vernal, Utah) 2021–2022 (joined CAJHL)

== Western Prospects League ==
As part of the approval of the WSHL to Tier II status in 2015, the WSHL Board of Governors also announced the formation of the Western Prospects League (WPL), a United Hockey Union approved Tier III development league for the WSHL. In its only season (2015–16), the WPL played with four Tier III prospect teams under Tier II organizations (the Casper Coyotes, Cheyenne Stampede, El Paso Rhinos, and Ogden Mustangs) with occasional games against non-WSHL affiliated teams.

In 2016, the UHU approved of two other Tier III leagues, the Canadian Premier Junior Hockey League (CPJHL) and the National College Prospects Hockey League (NCPHL). Several of the WSHL organizations then announced affiliations with some of the NCPHL teams to act as a developmental team and the WPL appears to have been disbanded.

=== Western Prospects League Champions ===
Season	WPL Champion	Results
2015–16	Casper Coyotes Tier III	18–3–0–0
