= Phoenix Polar Bears =

- City: Chandler, Arizona
- League: WSHL
- Division: Western
- Founded: 1999
- Home arena: Desert Schools Coyotes Center
- Colors: Black, purple, silver
- Owner: Harry Mahood
- General manager: Harry Mahood
- Head coach: Harry Mahood

Franchise history
- 1999–2011: Phoenix Polar Bears
- 2011–2018: Phoenix Knights

Championships
- Playoff championships: 2001, 2002, 2003, 2004, 2005, 2007, 2009, 2010 (WSHL Thorne Cup); 2003 (USA Hockey Tier III National Championship)

The Phoenix Polar Bears were a USA Hockey-sanctioned Junior A Tier III ice hockey team based out of Phoenix, Arizona. Their host facility was the Desert Schools Coyotes Center in Chandler, Arizona. The Polar Bears were a member of the Western States Hockey League but vacated their membership in the league when the WSHL moved away from USA Hockey sanctioning in 2011.

== History ==
The Phoenix Polar Bears were formed as an expansion team by Harry Mahood and Blaine Boyle for the Western States Hockey League in 1999. Until 2009, Mahood operated as the owner, general manager, and head coach of the Polar Bears and became one of the most successful franchises in the WSHL under his tenure. In 2011, the Polar Bears left the WSHL when the league dropped their USA Hockey membership and joined the United Hockey Union. After folding, the franchise was sold and their WSHL membership license was transferred to Arizona Hockey Club, Inc. to create the Phoenix Knights junior hockey team.

In 2003, the team won the USA Hockey Tier III Junior B National Championship, beating the St. Louis Jr. Blues, 1–0, after a perfect regular season record of 47–0. Edwin Trebian, a local Phoenix player scored the national championship goal. In 2002 and 2004, the team won a silver medal at the USA Hockey Junior B National Tournament. In 2004, the Polar Bears received the National Fair Play Award at the National Tournament. Under Mahood, the Phoenix Polar Bears recorded 575 wins, seven WSHL Thorne Cup Championships, nine consecutive National Tournament appearances, three undefeated seasons in WSHL play, one nationally undefeated season in 2003, the 2004 National Fair Play award and graduated over 170 players to all levels of NHL, NCAA, CIAU, minor professional, major junior, and ACHA hockey. Concurrently, the Phoenix Polar Bears raised several hundred thousands of dollars for Making Strides Against Breast Cancer, American Heart Association, Phoenix Thunderbirds, Child Find, American Red Cross and various other community programs and charities.

== Alumni ==
Among the many alumni to play college and advanced levels of junior and major junior hockey, including:

- Dusty Collins, a local Phoenix born player drafted to the Tampa Bay Lightning in 2005 and enjoyed a short career in the minors before retiring.
- Tyler Haskins from Ohio who was drafted to the Detroit Red Wings in 2005 and a captain for EHC Wolfsburg in the Deutsche Eishockey Liga.
- Jeremy Langlois, a Tempe, Arizona-native who played college hockey at Quinnipiac University and signed an NHL tryout contract with the San Jose Sharks.

== Youth hockey ==
Initially, the youth hockey program at Polar Ice, Peoria, Polar Ice Chandler and Polar Ice Gilbert were named after this team and were called the Jr. Polar Bears. They had teams ranging from Mites to Midget and competed annually across the United States.

== Championships ==
The Polar Bears have won seven Thorne Cups, awarded to the WSHL playoff champions in 2001, 2002, 2003, 2004, 2005, 2007, 2009, and 2010.

In addition to WSHL championships the team won the USA Hockey Tier III Junior B National Championship in 2003, were runners-up in 2002, and third place in 2008.
