= Long Beach Bombers =

- City: Lakewood, California
- League: USPHL Premier
- Division: Pacific
- Founded: 2012
- Home arena: The Rinks - Lakewood Ice
- Colors: Pink, Blue, & black

Franchise history
- 2012–2020: Ontario Avalanche
- 2020–2021: Anaheim Avalanche
- 2021–2024: Long Beach Shredders
- 2024–Present: Long Beach Bombers

The Long Beach Bombers are a Tier III junior ice hockey team in Pacific group of the United States Premier Hockey League's (USPHL) Premier Division. The team plays its home games at The Rinks – Lakewood ICE in Lakewood, California.

== History ==
Following the departure of the original Bombers franchise, Long Beach native and former Anaheim Ducks player Emerson Etem founded a new team. The Long Beach Shredders, were set to begin play in 2021 at the same Lakewood Ice location as the Bombers. The Shredders played fairly poorly during their brief existence, ending their 2024 season as the worst team in the Pacific division and third worst in the Premier League overall with a 6-40-0 record in 46 games and a -338 goal differential.

== Rebrand announcement ==
In April 2024, the USPHL reported that former Bombers player Curtis Fisher and SoCal entrepreneur Josh Fitzgerald had purchased the Shredders and revived the Bombers name. Fisher had played for the team when it was the Bay City Bombers and when it first became the Long Beach Bombers. Fitzgerald was a longtime supporter and a previous club sponsor. Their 2024-25 season opener was against the fledgling Ventura Vikings.

== Season-by-season records ==
| Season | GP | W | L | OTW | OTL | Pts | GF | GA | PIM | Finish | Playoffs |
|---|---|---|---|---|---|---|---|---|---|---|---|
Western States Hockey League
Ontario Avalanche
| 2012–13 | 46 | 24 | 22 | – | 0 | 48 | 157 | 164 | – | 5th of 6, Western Div. 11th of 22, WSHL | Missing information |
| 2013–14 | 46 | 32 | 11 | – | 3 | 67 | 157 | 164 | – | 2nd of 6, Pacific Div. 4th of 24, WSHL | Won Div. Semifinal series, 2–1 (Valencia Flyers); Lost Div. Final series, 0–2 (Fresno Monsters) |
| 2014–15 | 46 | 25 | 15 | – | 6 | 56 | 193 | 143 | – | 4th of 8, Western Div. 12th of 28, WSHL | Won Div. Quarterfinal series, 2–0 (Las Vegas Storm); Lost Div. Semifinal series, 1–2 (Valencia Flyers) |
| 2015–16 | 52 | 28 | 23 | – | 1 | 57 | 175 | 166 | – | 4th of 8, Western Div. 8th of 16, Pacific Conf. 14th of 29, WSHL | Won Div. Quarterfinal series, 2–1 (Phoenix Knights); Lost Div. Semifinal series, 0–2 (Valencia Flyers) |
| 2016–17 | 52 | 33 | 17 | – | 2 | 68 | 250 | 161 | – | 3rd of 8, Western Div. 11th of 28, WSHL | Won Div. Quarterfinal series, 2–0 (San Diego Sabers); Lost Div. Semifinal series, 0–2 (Valencia Flyers) |
| 2017–18 | 51 | 33 | 15 | – | 3 | 69 | 227 | 177 | – | 2nd of 6, Western Div. 8th of 23, WSHL | Lost Div. Semifinal series, 1–2 (Fresno Monsters) |
| 2018–19 | 51 | 17 | 28 | 3 | 3 | 60 | 183 | 227 | – | 4th of 5, Western Div. t-14th of 23, WSHL | Won Div. Quarterfinal series, 2–0 (Valencia Flyers); Lost Div. Semifinal series, 0–2 (Long Beach Bombers) |
| 2019–20 | 51 | 25 | 21 | 2 | 2 | 81 | 205 | 176 | – | 4th of 5, Western Div. 12th of 23, WSHL | Postseason cancelled |
USPHL Premier
Anaheim Avalanche
| 2020–21 | 36 | 8 | 27 | – | 1 | 17 | 96 | 188 | – | 3rd of 5, Pacific Div. t-55th of 62, USPHL Premier | Lost Div. Semifinal, 0–4 (Las Vegas Thunderbirds) |
Long Beach Shredders
| 2021–22 | 44 | 11 | 29 | – | 4 | 26 | 149 | 276 | 844 | 6th of 6, Pacific Div. 53th of 64, USPHL Premier | Did Not Qualify |
| 2022–23 | 44 | 8 | 34 | – | 4 | 20 | 135 | 281 | 701 | 6th of 7, Pacific Div. 60th of 70, USPHL Premier | Did Not Qualify |
| 2023–24 | 46 | 6 | 40 | – | 0 | 12 | 84 | 422 | 1055 | 7th of 7, Pacific Div. 58th of 61, USPHL Premier | Did Not Qualify |
Long Beach Bombers
| 2024–25 | 46 | 10 | 34 | – | 2 | 22 | 121 | 232 | 1222 | 8th of 8, Pacific Div. 61st of 73, USPHL Premier | Did Not Qualify |
| 2025–26 | 46 | 16 | 27 | 3 | 0 | 35 | 156 | 215 | 826 | 5th of 8, Pacific Div. 52nd of 77, USPHL Premier | Did Not Qualify |

== Former logos ==
Ontario Avalanche

Long Beach Shredders
