= 2024–25 USPHL Premier season =

- League: United States Premier Hockey League; Premier
- Sport: Ice hockey
- Duration: Regular season September 6, 2024 – March 2, 2025; Postseason; February 26 – March 24, 2025
- Games: 46–25
- Teams: 73

Regular season
- Season champions: Vernal Oilers
- Top scorer: Roman Wolynec (Seattle Totems)

USPHL Premier Playoffs
- Finals champions: Vernal Oilers
- Runners-up: Springfield Pics

USPHL Premier seasons
- ← 2023–24 2025–26 →

The 2024–25 USPHL Premier season was the 12th season of the Premier Division of the United States Premier Hockey League (USPHL). The regular season ran from September 6, 2024 to March 2, 2025 with an unbalanced schedule. The Vernal Oilers won the regular season championship and went on to defeat the Springfield Pics 6–2 in the Championship game.

== Member changes ==
- On January 25, 2024, the Muskegon Lumberjacks announced that their affiliate, the Red Bank Generals, would join the USPHL's Premier Division for this season.
- On February 12, the USPHL announced the addition of five Canadian teams, the Hawkesbury Knights, Kingston Wranglers, Montreal Black Vees, Somang Hockey, and Universel Sherbrooke. The five teams joined Universel Collège Gatineau to form a new Canada Division.
- In March, the Ventura Vikings joined the Pacific Division of the USPHL Premier.
- A week later, the Bremerton Sockeyes, Colorado Fighting Elk, Mercer Chiefs, Thunder Hockey Club and West Chester Wolves were added as additional expansion franchises.
- At the same time, the Buffalo Stampede relocated and became the Fresh Coast Freeze, the Las Vegas Thunderbirds relocated and became the Henderson Force, the Nashville Spartans relocated and became the Red River Spartans and the Casper Roughnecks relocated and became the Iron County Yeti.
- At the beginning of April, the Long Beach Shredders rebranded as the Long Beach Bombers.
- Over the summer, the league approved the transfer of the Boston Junior Rangers and the Worcester Jr. Railers from the Eastern Hockey League.
- In August, the Columbia Infantry announced that they would not be fielding a team for this season.
- The Palm Beach Typhoon suspended play after a game against the Dells Ducks on January 6. Neither the team nor the league made explicit mention of the reason. While the team cancelled its final 19 games, the Typhoon remained members of the league and were included on the USPHL's schedule for the 2025–26 season.

== Regular season ==
The standings at the end of the regular season were as follows:

Note: x = clinched playoff berth; y = clinched division title; z = clinched regular season title

=== Standings ===
==== Atlantic Division ====
Team	GP	W	L	OTL	Pts	GF	GA
xy – Connecticut Jr. Rangers	44	31	9	4	66	213	127
x – Elmira Impact	44	29	11	4	62	197	132
x – West Chester Wolves	44	27	11	6	60	152	104
x – Red Bank Generals	44	28	12	4	60	193	153
x – Mercer Chiefs	44	23	16	5	51	163	150
x – Rockets Hockey Club	44	24	18	2	50	190	159
x – P.A.L. Jr. Islanders	44	22	16	6	50	175	166
x – Wilkes-Barre/Scranton Knights	44	17	21	6	40	129	154
Jersey Hitmen	44	15	26	3	33	131	199
Hershey Cubs	44	14	27	3	31	106	168
Brooklyn Aviators	44	5	36	3	13	107	275

==== Canada Division ====
Team	GP	W	L	OTL	Pts	GF	GA
xy – Montreal Black Vees	44	27	15	2	56	193	156
x – Hawkesbury Knights	44	25	15	4	54	197	127
x – Universel Sherbrooke	44	22	17	5	49	173	149
x – Universel Collège Gatineau	44	20	22	2	42	179	189
x – Somang Hockey	44	18	23	3	39	173	198
x – Kingston Wranglers	44	4	40	0	8	55	310

==== Florida Division ====
Team	GP	W	L	OTL	Pts	GF	GA
xy – Tampa Bay Juniors	42	33	7	2	68	228	108
x – Bold City Battalion	42	24	12	6	54	160	136
x – Florida Eels	40	24	12	4	52	147	115
x – Atlanta Madhatters	42	15	25	2	32	121	168
x – Florida Jr. Blades	39	12	26	1	25	111	173
Palm Beach Typhoon	25	3	22	0	6	47	155

==== Great Lakes Division ====
Team	GP	W	L	OTL	Pts	GF	GA
xy – Metro Jets	44	36	8	0	72	261	70
x – Toledo Cherokee	44	35	8	1	71	238	77
x – Columbus Mavericks	44	27	17	0	54	202	169
x – Red River Spartans	44	22	21	1	45	167	203
x – Cincinnati Jr. Cyclones	44	14	29	1	29	127	210
x – Battle Creek Kernels	44	9	34	1	19	106	237
Fresh Coast Freeze	44	5	38	1	11	104	301

==== Midwest Division ====
Team	GP	W	L	OTL	Pts	GF	GA
xy – Fort Wayne Spacemen	44	33	8	3	69	245	93
x – Chicago Crush	44	29	11	4	62	197	124
x – Metro Jets Development Program	44	22	19	3	47	147	154
x – Chicago Cougars	44	23	21	0	46	137	141
x – Decatur Blaze	44	10	30	4	24	101	204
x – Motor City Gamblers	44	8	34	2	18	92	219

==== New England Division ====
Team	GP	W	L	OTL	Pts	GF	GA
xy – Islanders Hockey Club	44	37	4	3	77	220	88
x – Springfield Pics	44	32	8	4	68	205	110
x – Northern Cyclones	44	30	9	5	65	153	99
x – South Shore Kings	44	30	12	2	62	149	105
x – Utica Jr. Comets	44	22	20	2	46	126	138
x – Worcester Jr. Railers	44	21	20	3	45	145	146
x – Boston Junior Bruins	44	20	20	4	44	154	162
x – Boston Junior Rangers	44	12	25	7	31	130	170
Thunder Hockey Club	44	5	36	3	13	97	272

==== North Division ====
Team	GP	W	L	OTL	Pts	GF	GA
xy – Minnesota Squatch	44	36	6	2	74	242	98
x – Wisconsin Rapids RiverKings	44	35	7	2	72	229	90
x – Northwest Express	44	29	13	2	60	222	142
x – Minnesota Mullets	44	25	17	2	52	191	148
x – Dells Ducks	44	24	19	1	49	187	169
x – Minnesota Blue Ox	44	22	20	2	46	151	157
x – Steele County Blades	44	20	20	4	44	173	176
x – Isanti Outlaws	44	7	34	3	17	106	274
Hudson Havoc	44	5	39	0	10	88	278

==== Northwest Division ====
Team	GP	W	L	OTL	Pts	GF	GA
xyz – Vernal Oilers	44	44	0	0	88	406	69
x – Seattle Totems	44	40	4	0	80	349	70
x – Bellingham Blazers	44	27	16	1	55	176	154
x – Iron County Yeti	44	13	30	1	27	141	326
Rogue Valley Royals	44	9	34	1	19	91	268
Bremerton Sockeyes	44	7	34	3	17	82	264
Colorado Fighting Elk	44	6	37	1	13	105	338

==== Pacific Division ====
Team	GP	W	L	OTL	Pts	GF	GA
xy – Fresno Monsters	46	37	9	0	74	270	127
x – Lake Tahoe Lakers	46	33	10	3	69	278	148
x – Ontario Jr. Reign	46	33	11	2	68	245	126
x – Henderson Force	46	29	15	2	60	189	132
San Diego Sabers	46	23	22	1	47	188	184
Bakersfield Roughnecks	46	16	26	4	36	158	245
Ventura Vikings	46	16	27	3	35	170	255
Long Beach Bombers	46	10	34	2	22	121	232

==== Southeast Division ====
Team	GP	W	L	OTL	Pts	GF	GA
xy – Charlotte Rush	44	29	8	7	65	159	97
x – Hampton Roads Whalers	44	28	9	7	63	162	132
x – Potomac Patriots	44	30	12	2	62	177	150
x – Carolina Jr. Hurricanes	44	21	17	6	48	140	127

=== Scoring leaders ===
Player	Team	GP	G	A	Pts	PIM
Roman Wolynec	Seattle Totems	43	39	124	163	24
Aatu Suontakanen	Seattle Totems	41	49	77	126	14
Knut Hörnkvist	San Diego Sabers	45	32	71	103	64
Cannon Bonifay	Minnesota Squatch	44	44	57	101	18
Kasper Pohjala	Vernal Oilers	28	26	71	97	10
Simon Eriksson	Fresno Monsters	44	40	54	94	12
Roni Alanko	Vernal Oilers	27	47	43	90	26
Brian Erte	Lake Tahoe Lakers	46	28	61	89	10
Sam Bailey	San Diego Sabers	46	40	48	88	20
Denver Craig	Ontario Jr. Reign	33	38	50	88	60

=== Leading goaltenders ===
Player	Team	GP	Mins	W	L	OTL	SOL	SO	GAA	SV%
Rostislav Efremov	Metro Jets	15	809	13	0	0	0	5	1.19	0.953
Thomas Cafarelli	Islanders Hockey Club	13	723	11	1	0	0	5	1.41	0.950
Evan Crawford	Charlotte Rush	18	1089	14	2	1	1	5	1.49	0.950
Cole Fennema	Seattle Totems	23	1250	19	1	0	0	10	1.54	0.935
Jordan Nicolucci	Fort Wayne Spacemen	13	691	9	2	1	0	3	1.56	0.933
Caleb Kril	Toledo Cherokee	22	1197	17	4	0	1	6	1.60	0.943
Matthew Dore	South Shore Kings	25	1479	19	4	1	0	3	1.66	0.944
Andrew Parmentier	Metro Jets	16	2231	11	5	0	0	4	1.77	0.925
Austin Nowak	Toledo Cherokee	20	1081	13	4	0	0	2	1.78	0.942
Daniel Cleofe	Seattle Totems	19	1087	16	3	0	0	5	1.82	0.913

== Premier Division playoffs ==
Teams are reseeded after the quarterfinal rounds.

=== Divisional Round ===
February 26 – March 15

==== Atlantic ====
Quarterfinals (Best-of-3)
1	Connecticut Jr. Rangers	2	2	-
8	Wilkes-Barre/Scranton Knights	4	4	-
2	Elmira Impact	4*	1	2
7	P.A.L. Jr. Islanders	3	4	5
3	West Chester Wolves	1	3	3
6	Rockets Hockey Club	2	1	4**
4	Red Bank Generals	4	1	1
5	Mercer Chiefs	3	4	6

Semifinals (Best-of-3)
5	Mercer Chiefs	1	1	-
8	Wilkes-Barre/Scranton Knights	4	3	-
6	Rockets Hockey Club	5*	4	5
7	P.A.L. Jr. Islanders	4	5*	6*

Final (Best-of-3)
8	Wilkes-Barre/Scranton Knights	2	1	-
7	P.A.L. Jr. Islanders	4	2	-

Note: * denotes overtime period(s)

==== Canada ====
Quarterfinals (Best-of-3)
3	Universel Sherbrooke	8	3	-
6	Kingston Wranglers	1	1	-
4	Universel Collège Gatineau	2*	5	-
5	Somang Hockey	1	2	-

Semifinals (Best-of-3)
1	Montreal Black Vees	7	5	-
4	Universel Collège Gatineau	4	3	-
2	Hawkesbury Knights	3	3	-
3	Universel Sherbrooke	6	5	-

Final (Best-of-3)
1	Montreal Black Vees	4	4	1
3	Universel Sherbrooke	2	6	4

Note: * denotes overtime period(s)

=== Canada Quarterfinals ===
==== (3) Universel Sherbrooke vs. (6) Kingston Wranglers ====
February 28	Universel Sherbrooke	8 – 1	Kingston Wranglers	Aréna de Bromont
4:36 - sh - Victor Proulx (1); 4:46 - sh - Félix Bélanger (1); 5:33 - Shawn Laperrière (1); 10:59 - Marc-Olivier Michaud (1)		First period	Wyatt Johnston (1) - 2:31
13:39 - Arthur Sevigny (1)		Second period	No scoring
1:32 - Nathan Pelletier (1); 8:39 - sh - Samuel Cardinal (1); 16:57 - Shawn Laperrière (2)		Third period	No scoring
Carlo Giordani (32 saves / 33 shots)		Goalie stats	Aristidis Panoskaltsis (30 saves / 35 shots); Callum Parkinson (14 saves / 17 shots)

March 1	Universel Sherbrooke	3 – 1	Kingston Wranglers	Aréna de Bromont
2:33 - Jason Maltais (1)		First period	No scoring
No scoring		Second period	No scoring
13:49 - Marc-Olivier Michaud (2); 14:21 - Félix Bélanger (2)		Third period	Carson Daniels (1) - 2:12
Simon Thibault (31 saves / 32 shots)		Goalie stats	Aristidis Panoskaltsis (47 saves / 50 shots)

Sherbrooke wins series 2 – 0

==== (4) Universel Sherbrooke vs. (5) Kingston Wranglers ====
February 26	Universel Collège Gatineau	2 – 1	OT	Somang Hockey	Meredith Centre
No scoring		First period		No scoring
7:13 - Derek Petitpas (1)		Second period		Lucas Choteau (1) - 4:55
No scoring		Third period		No scoring
0:15 - Derek Petitpas (2)		First overtime period		No scoring
Marcus Gomes (18 saves / 19 shots)		Goalie stats		Alexis Viel (24 saves / 26 shots)

February 27	Universel Collège Gatineau	5 – 2	Somang Hockey	Meredith Centre
6:46 - Thomas St-Louis (1); 12:16 - Charlie Olmsted (1); 17:16 - sh - Justin Deschenes (1)		First period	Eriks Juhnevics (1) - 2:35
No scoring		Second period	Lucas Choteau (2) - pp - 14:14
13:24 - Mathias St-Laurent (1); 15:44 - Thomas St-Louis (2)		Third period	No scoring
Marcus Gomes (19 saves / 21 shots)		Goalie stats	Alexis Viel (27 saves / 32 shots)

Gatineau wins series 2 – 0

=== Canada Semifinals ===
==== (1) Montreal Black Vees vs. (4) Universel Collège Gatineau ====
March 5	Montreal Black Vees	7 – 4	Universel Collège Gatineau	Aréna Chénier
12:30 - Olivier Sirois (1)		First period	Derek Petitpas (3) - 0:06
4:26 - pp - Dylan Perron (1); 13:29 - Mickael Morissette (1)		Second period	Charlie Olmsted (2) - pp - 9:01; Derek Petitpas (4) - pp - 17:28
0:58 - pp - Dylan Perron (2); 4:37 - Louderic Cloutier (1); 8:09 - Elliot Fortin (1); 18:14 - Dylan Perron (3)		Third period	Derek Petitpas (5) - 9:58
Nathan Rutter-Richardson (29 saves / 33 shots)		Goalie stats	Marcus Gomes (31 saves / 37 shots); Julius Kolari (0 saves / 1 shot)

March 7	Montreal Black Vees	5 – 3	Universel Collège Gatineau	Aréna Chénier
14:19 - Benjamin Lavallée (1)		First period	No scoring
9:41 - Dylan Perron (4); 12:54 - Gabriel François (1); 14:14 - Charles-Émile Clermont (1)		Second period	Clovis Balleux (1) - pp - 16:37; Charles Martel (1) - 17:27
2:51 - Dylan Perron (5)		Third period	Clovis Balleux (2) - pp - 19:11
Nathan Rutter-Richardson (36 saves / 39 shots)		Goalie stats	Marcus Gomes (44 saves / 49 shots)

Montreal wins series 2 – 0

==== (2) Hawkesbury Knights vs. (3) Universel Sherbrooke ====
March 6	Hawkesbury Knights	3 – 6	Universel Sherbrooke	Robert Hartley Sports Complex
No scoring		First period	Mattia Gaier (1) - 7:51; Shawn Laperrière (3) - 9:46
1:24 - Tommy Amos (1); 13:23 - Zakary Corriveau (1)		Second period	Jason Maltais (2) - pp - 17:40
14:35 - sh - Antoine Daoud (1)		Third period	Félix Bélanger (3) - 10:53; Victor Proulx (2) - 11:51; Victor Proulx (3) - sh - en - 17:26
George Foti (31 saves / 35 shots)		Goalie stats	Simon Thibault (43 saves / 46 shots)

March 8	Hawkesbury Knights	3 – 5	Universel Sherbrooke	Robert Hartley Sports Complex
0:30 - William Cotton (1); 8:20 - Matt Burns (1)		First period	Gabriel Boivin (1) - 13:24
8:48 - Mathis Marleau (1)		Second period	Jason Maltais (3) - 17:59
No scoring		Third period	Noah Trempe (1) - 2:53; Jason Maltais (4) - 19:20; Olivier Touchette (1) - en - 19:54
Jérémie Barron (33 saves / 37 shots)		Goalie stats	Carlo Giordani (55 saves / 58 shots)

Sherbrooke wins series 2 – 0

=== Canada Finals ===
==== (1) Montreal Black Vees vs. (3) Universel Sherbrooke ====
March 12	Montreal Black Vees	4 – 2	Universel Sherbrooke	Aréna Chénier
1:05 - Zachary Collin (1); 9:19 - Olivier Sirois (2); 18:27 - Charles-Émile Clermont (2)		First period	Mattia Gaier (2) - 0:26
No scoring		Second period	Gabriel Boivin (2) - 17:31
6:21 - Elliot Fortin (2)		Third period	No scoring
Nathan Rutter-Richardson (23 saves / 25 shots)		Goalie stats	Simon Thibault (41 saves / 45 shots)

March 14	Montreal Black Vees	4 – 6	Universel Sherbrooke	Aréna Chénier
8:34 - Charles-Émile Clermont (3); 10:09 - pp - Mickael Morissette (2)		First period	Jason Maltais (5) - pp - 7:09; Olivier Touchette (2) - 16:08
No scoring		Second period	Olivier Touchette (3) - 10:10
3:34 - Matthew Robidoux (1); 8:12 - Charles-Émile Clermont (4)		Third period	Jason Maltais (6) - 0:59; Jason Maltais (7) - 15:14; Victor Proulx (4) - 19:29
Nathan Rutter-Richardson (20 saves / 26 shots)		Goalie stats	Carlo Giordani (38 saves / 42 shots)

March 15	Montreal Black Vees	1 – 4	Universel Sherbrooke	Aréna Chénier
No scoring		First period	16:42 - Victor Proulx (5)
No scoring		Second period	12:14 - Noah Trempe (2); 16:58 - Gabriel Boivin (3)
Gabriel François (2) - pp - 6:01		Third period	3:29 - Mattia Gaier (3)
Nathan Rutter-Richardson (36 saves / 40 shots)		Goalie stats	Carlo Giordani (32 saves / 33 shots)

Sherbrooke wins series 2 – 1

==== Florida ====
Play-In (Best-of-1)
4	Atlanta Madhatters	2
5	Florida Jr. Blades	5

First Round (Best-of-1)
1	Tampa Bay Juniors	1
5	Florida Jr. Blades	0
2	Bold City Battalion	2
3	Florida Eels	4
Losers Semifinal
2	Bold City Battalion	7
5	Florida Jr. Blades	1

Winners Semifinal (Best-of-1)
1	Tampa Bay Juniors	4
3	Florida Eels	0
Losers Final
3	Florida Eels	1
2	Bold City Battalion	2

Final (Best-of-1)
1	Tampa Bay Juniors	3**
2	Bold City Battalion	2

Note: * denotes overtime period(s)

=== Florida Play-In ===
==== (4) Atlanta Madhatters vs. (5) Toledo Cherokee ====
March 6	Atlanta Madhatters	2 – 5	Florida Jr. Blades	AdventHealth Center Ice
7:24 - Sebastian Kaminsky (1); 17:54 - pp - Landon Hackler (1)		First period	No scoring
No scoring		Second period	Easton Hall (1) - 8:56; Sander Korrell (1) - 14:00; Easton Hall (2) - 16:46; Sander Korrell (2) - pp - 16:46
No scoring		Third period	Shawn Bélanger-Chisholm (1) - sh - 18:02
Dylan Bruce (23 saves / 28 shots)		Goalie stats	Gage Cercone (38 saves / 40 shots)

=== Florida First Round ===
==== (1) Tampa Bay Juniors vs. (5) Toledo Cherokee ====
March 7	Tampa Bay Juniors	1 – 0	Florida Jr. Blades	AdventHealth Center Ice
No scoring		First period	No scoring
No scoring		Second period	No scoring
3:59 - Jakub Koudelný (1)		Third period	No scoring
Savva Serdiuk (28 saves / 28 shots)		Goalie stats	Gage Cercone (46 saves / 47 shots)

==== (2) Bold City Battalion vs. (3) Florida Eels ====
March 7	Bold City Battalion	2 – 4	Florida Eels	AdventHealth Center Ice
13:11 - Easton Harrison (1)		First period	Yiorgos Bikakis (1) - 15:03
14:08 - Tomas Cihlar (1)		Second period	Sixten Gidlund (1) - 1:40; Robin Kuusik (1) - 2:15
No scoring		Third period	Gino Indelicato (1) - 19:21
Evan Stringer (26 saves / 30 shots)		Goalie stats	Russ Decoste (24 saves / 26 shots)

=== Florida Losers Semifinal ===
==== (2) Bold City Battalion vs. (5) Florida Jr. Blades ====
March 7	Bold City Battalion	7 – 1	Florida Jr. Blades	AdventHealth Center Ice
9:37 - pp - Emil Grinsvall (1); 16:18 - pp - Brendan Morea (1)		First period	Hunter McKnight (1) - pp - 2:13
5:25 - Sebastian Elrod (1)		Second period	No scoring
3:20 - Cayden Conover (1); 7:21 - pp - Bryson Walz (1); 15:58 - pp - Easton Harrison (2); 17:16 - Cayden Conover (2)		Third period	No scoring
Evan Stringer (30 saves / 31 shots)		Goalie stats	Gage Cercone (32 saves / 39 shots)

=== Florida Winners Semifinals ===
==== (1) Tampa Bay Juniors vs. (3) Florida Eels ====
March 8	Tampa Bay Juniors	4 – 0	Florida Eels	AdventHealth Center Ice
14:59 - Milan Levcenko (1)		First period	No scoring
11:57 - sh - Augie Ashley (1)		Second period	No scoring
14:08 - Milan Levcenko (2); 19:39 - Jakub Koudelný (2)		Third period	No scoring
Savva Serdiuk (22 saves / 22 shots); Nate Galbraith (1 save / 1 shot)		Goalie stats	Russ Decoste (32 saves / 36 shots)

=== Florida Losers Final ===
==== (2) Bold City Battalion vs. (3) Florida Eels ====
March 9	Bold City Battalion	2 – 1	Florida Eels	AdventHealth Center Ice
No scoring		First period	Derrick Pedersen (1) - pp - 18:49
12:32 - pp - Justus Harrison (1)		Second period	No scoring
8:26 - Mitchell Berens (1)		Third period	No scoring
Evan Stringer (34 saves / 35 shots)		Goalie stats	Russ Decoste (22 saves / 24 shots)

=== Florida Finals ===
==== (1) Tampa Bay Juniors vs. (2) Bold City Battalion ====
March 10	Tampa Bay Juniors	3 – 2	2OT	Bold City Battalion	AdventHealth Center Ice
8:45 - pp - Jason Johnson (1)		First period		Emil Grinsvall (2) - pp - 16:35
19:29 - Dawson Osborn (1)		Second period		Tomas Cihlar (2) - 0:08
No scoring		Third period		No scoring
5:25 - Aki Jokela (1)		Second overtime period		No scoring
Savva Serdiuk (36 saves / 38 shots)		Goalie stats		Evan Stringer (42 saves / 45 shots)

==== Great Lakes ====
Quarterfinals (Best-of-3)
3	Columbus Mavericks	2	4	7
6	Battle Creek Kernels	3	2	1
4	Red River Spartans	0	2	-
5	Cincinnati Jr. Cyclones	1	3*	-

Semifinals (Best-of-3)
1	Metro Jets	9	7	-
5	Cincinnati Jr. Cyclones	1	2	-
2	Toledo Cherokee	7	5*	-
3	Columbus Mavericks	3	4	-

Final (Best-of-3)
1	Metro Jets	1	2	5
2	Toledo Cherokee	2*	1	4

Note: * denotes overtime period(s)

=== Great Lakes Quarterfinals ===
==== (3) Columbus Mavericks vs. (6) Battle Creek Kernels ====
February 27	Columbus Mavericks	2 – 3	Battle Creek Kernels	OhioHealth Chiller North
No scoring		First period	Brayden Lewis (1) - 2:03; Brayden Lewis (2) - 12:23
No scoring		Second period	No scoring
13:44 - sh - Brian Savage (1); 18:46 - sh - Graham Wood (1)		Third period	Colton Place (1) - 2:50
Jonah Little (30 saves / 33 shots)		Goalie stats	Galvin Reagan (68 saves / 70 shots)

February 28	Columbus Mavericks	4 – 2	Battle Creek Kernels	OhioHealth Chiller North
14:54 - Alexander Brown (1)		First period	No scoring
9:04 - Thomas Eggleston (1); 10:13 - Brady Gedman (1)		Second period	Jakub Kurcab (1) - pp - 17:37
0:31 - Giovanni Valentine (1)		Third period	Nick Marcella (1) - 7:45
Lukáš Kamenický (34 saves / 36 shots)		Goalie stats	Galvin Reagan (55 saves / 59 shots)

March 1	Columbus Mavericks	7 – 1	Battle Creek Kernels	OhioHealth Chiller North
Kobe Rickabaugh (1) - 2:10		First period	No scoring
Alexander Brown (2) - 4:15; Brady Gedman (2) - 8:10; Caden Cavalieri (1) - 8:19; Giovanni Valentine (2) - 14:37; Giovanni Valentine (3) - 18:53		Second period	10:07 - Zachary Wolf (1)
Tryson Harrell (1) - pp - 7:12		Third period	No scoring
Jonah Little (21 saves / 22 shots)		Goalie stats	Galvin Reagan (50 saves / 57 shots)

Columbus wins series 2 – 1

==== (4) Red River Spartans vs. (5) Cincinnati Jr. Cyclones ====
February 27	Red River Spartans	0 – 1	Cincinnati Jr. Cyclones	Ford Ice Center Clarksville
No scoring		First period	No scoring
No scoring		Second period	Zach Lehman (1) - pp - 17:53
No scoring		Third period	No scoring
Andrew Young (31 saves / 32 shots)		Goalie stats	Nicholas Wah (38 saves / 38 shots)

February 28	Red River Spartans	2 – 3	OT	Cincinnati Jr. Cyclones	Ford Ice Center Clarksville
12:17 - Nico Cervenak (1)		First period		No scoring
7:05 - sh - Blake Martino (1)		Second period		No scoring
No scoring		Third period		Ethan Keddie (1) - 0:45; Cameron Coogan (1) - 5:42
No scoring		First overtime period		Hank Davis (1) - 16:30
Andrew Young (61 saves / 64 shots)		Goalie stats		Nicholas Wah (62 saves / 64 shots)

Cincinnati wins series 2 – 0

=== Great Lakes Semifinals ===
==== (1) Metro Jets vs. (5) Cincinnati Jr. Cyclones ====
March 7	Metro Jets	9 – 1	Cincinnati Jr. Cyclones	Mount Clemens Ice Arena
3:45 - Donovan Ascencio (1)		First period	Dominic Nuanes (1) - 15:00
18:09 - Luka Maj Pivec (1); 19:42 - pp - Luka Maj Pivec (2)		Second period	No scoring
0:19 - Pierce Ashcroft (1); 1:07 - pp - Luka Maj Pivec (3); 8:13 - Pierce Ashcroft (2); 9:40 - Jack Noonan (1); 10:39 - Jack Schnur (1); 17:48 - Tim Monaghan (1)		Third period	No scoring
Rostislav Efremov (18 saves / 19 shots)		Goalie stats	Nicholas Wah (41 saves / 48 shots); Carson Balow (0 saves / 2 shots)

March 8	Metro Jets	7 – 2	Cincinnati Jr. Cyclones	Mount Clemens Ice Arena
2:31 - Pierce Ashcroft (3); 15:46 - Sutton Majeske (1)		First period	Hank Davis (2) - 12:06
0:41 - pp - Jack Noonan (2); 5:59 - AJ Zaccagni (1); 9:48 - Evan Cote (1); 10:46 - AJ Zaccagni (2)		Second period	Noah Geggie (1) - 15:43
12:54 - pp - Miran Janežič (1)		Third period	No scoring
Andrew Parmentier (14 saves / 16 shots); Austin Muirhead (0 saves / 0 shots)		Goalie stats	Nicholas Wah (45 saves / 52 shots)

Metro wins series 2 – 0

==== (2) Toledo Cherokee vs. (3) Columbus Mavericks ====
March 7	Toledo Cherokee	7 – 3	Columbus Mavericks	Team Toledo Ice House
4:29 - Aidan Besedic (1); 10:50 - Callum Millar (1)		First period	No scoring
1:06 - pp - Cameron Krause (1); 5:10 - pp - Gavin Elkins (1); 15:10 - Trevin Johnson (1); 19:05 - pp - Gerdas Paulauskas (1)		Second period	Giovanni Valentine (4) - pp - 10:11
5:49 - Leo Crawford (1)		Third period	Brian Savage (2) - pp - 9:22; Giovanni Valentine (5) - 12:38
Austin Nowak (21 saves / 24 shots)		Goalie stats	Jonah Little (54 saves / 61 shots)

March 8	Toledo Cherokee	5 – 4	OT	Columbus Mavericks	Team Toledo Ice House

Toledo wins series 2 – 0

=== Great Lakes Final ===
==== (1) Metro Jets vs. (2) Toledo Cherokee ====
March 14	Metro Jets	1 – 2	OT	Toledo Cherokee	Mount Clemens Ice Arena

March 15	Metro Jets	2 – 1	Toledo Cherokee	Mount Clemens Ice Arena

March 16	Metro Jets	5 – 4	Toledo Cherokee	Mount Clemens Ice Arena

Metro wins series 2 – 1

==== Midwest ====
Quarterfinals (Best-of-3)
3	Metro Jets Development Program	2	6	2
6	Motor City Gamblers	5	2	0
4	Chicago Cougars	6	4	-
5	Decatur Blaze	2	3	-

Semifinals (Best-of-3)
1	Fort Wayne Spacemen	7	4	-
4	Chicago Cougars	1	2	-
2	Chicago Crush	6	4	-
3	Metro Jets Development Program	2	2	-

Final (Best-of-3)
1	Fort Wayne Spacemen	8	3	-
2	Chicago Crush	1	2	-

Note: * denotes overtime period(s)

=== Midwest Quarterfinals ===
==== (3) MJDP vs. (6) Motor City Gamblers ====
March 2	MJDP	2 – 5	Motor City Gamblers	Mount Clemens Ice Arena
13:52 - Raphaël Belley-Pelletier (1)		First period	Kohen Dixson (1) - 10:02
No scoring		Second period	Braeden Goers (1) - 3:25; Kohen Dixson (3) - 3:44; Tadd Siglow (1) - sh - 19:59
13:23 - Gianluca Virelli (1)		Third period	Ignacy Drozd (1) - sh - en - 16:06
Eliot Duerr (31 saves / 35 shots)		Goalie stats	Tyler Houle (32 saves / 34 shots)

March 3	MJDP	6 – 2	Motor City Gamblers	Mount Clemens Ice Arena
18:07 - Noah Bodurka (1); 18:07 - Ronald Oyer (1)		First period	Braeden Goers (2) - 8:09
2:05 - pp - Noah Bodurka (2); 5:28 - Christopher Otero (1)		Second period	No scoring
2:27 - Christopher Otero (2); 2:35 - Matthew Hopersberger (1); 18:41 - Matthew Hopersberger (2)		Third period	No scoring
William Belitski (18 saves / 20 shots)		Goalie stats	Tyler Houle (33 saves / 39 shots)

March 4	MJDP	2 – 0	Motor City Gamblers	Mount Clemens Ice Arena
Christopher Otero (3) - 3:37		First period	No scoring
No scoring		Second period	No scoring
Raphaël Belley-Pelletier (2) - 10:41		Third period	No scoring
William Belitski (24 saves / 24 shots)		Goalie stats	Luka Straser (40 saves / 42 shots)

MJDP wins series 2 – 1

==== (4) Chicago Cougars vs. (5) Decatur Blaze ====
March 1	Chicago Cougars	6 – 2	Decatur Blaze	Orbit Ice Arena
14:52 - Nikolay Ouriashev (1)		First period	Kieran Prichett (1) - 5:41
6:56 - Aidan Middendorf (1); 12:09 - Aiden Middendorf (2); 15:17 - Austin Plumert (1); 16:52 - Rocco Romita (1)		Second period	Petr Treutner (1) - pp - 14:14
3:17 - sh - Caleb Berkenkotter (1)		Third period	No scoring
Cameron Boville (20 saves / 22 shots)		Goalie stats	David Račan (45 saves / 51 shots)

March 2	Chicago Cougars	4 – 3	Decatur Blaze	Orbit Ice Arena
0:35 - Rocco Romita (2)		First period	Petr Treutner (2) - sh - 13:27
3:11 - pp - Rocco Romita (3); 14:05 - pp - Rocco Romita (4)		Second period	No scoring
18:29 - Austin Plumert (2)		Third period	Kieran Prichett (2) - 3:29; Oscar Sizemore (1) - 18:42
Cameron Boville (37 saves / 40 shots)		Goalie stats	David Račan (35 saves / 39 shots)

Chicago wins series 2 – 0

=== Midwest Semifinals ===
==== (1) Fort Wayne Spacemen vs. (4) Chicago Cougars ====
March 8	Fort Wayne Spacemen	7 – 1	Chicago Cougars	PSM Icehouse
0:33 - Tucker Tone (1); 7:40 - Jace Lacey (1)		First period	No scoring
5:03 - pp - Ivan Barnashov (1); 6:21 - Broderik Burge (1)		Second period	No scoring
4:22 - Dayrick Richard (1); 16:39 - pp - Ivan Khirsa (1); 17:49 - Dayrick Richard (2)		Third period	Brett Tumbrink (1) - 1:25
Christopher Gingras (14 saves / 15 shots)		Goalie stats	Cameron Boville (35 saves / 42 shots)

March 9	Fort Wayne Spacemen	4 – 2	Chicago Cougars	PSM Icehouse
No scoring		First period	Jordan Trakosas (1) - pp - 12:29
0:37 - Tucker Tone (2); 4:32 - pp - Alexis Toussaint (1); 9:07 - Tucker Tone (3); 18:15 - Alexis Toussaint (2)		Second period	No scoring
No scoring		Third period	William Stornello (1) - 5:16
Christopher Gingras (27 saves / 29 shots)		Goalie stats	Cameron Boville (38 saves / 42 shots)

Fort Wayne wins series 2 – 0

==== (2) Chicago Crush vs. (3) MJDP ====
March 9	Chicago Crush	6 – 2	MJDP	Orbit Ice Arena
7:13 - MacGregor King (1)		First period	Ludovick Dussault (1) - pp - 17:24
1:09 - Spencer Kauke (1); 14:46 - pp - Cyler Brogle (1)		Second period	No scoring
7:34 - Xavier Othon (1); 10:12 - David Long (1); 14:21 - pp - David Long (2)		Third period	Ludovick Dussault (2) - 6:23
Patrick Johansen (34 saves / 36 shots)		Goalie stats	William Belitski (27 saves / 33 shots)

March 10	Chicago Crush	4 – 2	MJDP	Orbit Ice Arena
18:28 - Jason Gongol (1)		First period	McKenna Baker III (1) - 17:49
3:13 - pp - Spencer Kauke (2); 11:03 - Jason Gongol (2)		Second period	Christopher Kobayashi (1) - 6:44
19:32 - en - Peter White (1)		Third period	No scoring
Aidan Wysoglad (33 saves / 35 shots)		Goalie stats	Ethan Carlone (25 saves / 28 shots)

Chicago wins series 2 – 0

=== Midwest Finals ===
==== (1) Fort Wayne Spacemen vs. (4) Chicago Crush ====
March 14	Fort Wayne Spacemen	8 – 1	Chicago Crush	PSM Icehouse
3:24 - Bogdan Vysotsky (1); 5:34 - Ivan Khirsa (2)		First period	No scoring
2:34 - Tucker Tone (4); 4:11 - pp - Jace Lacey (2); 4:53 - Ivan Khirsa (3); 7:36 - pp - Alexis Toussaint (3)		Second period	No scoring
2:57 - Thomas Cheeney (1); 15:57 - pp - Aiden Byler (1)		Third period	MacGregor King (2) - 11:33
Christopher Gingras (29 saves / 30 shots)		Goalie stats	Patrick Johansen (16 saves / 21 shots); Aidan Wysoglad (8 saves / 11 shots)

March 15	Fort Wayne Spacemen	3 – 2	Chicago Crush	PSM Icehouse
2:51 - pp - Tucker Tone (5)		First period	No scoring
1:44 - pp - Tucker Tone (6); 16:40 - pp - Ivan Barnashov (2)		Second period	Xavier Othon (2) - pp - 11:55
No scoring		Third period	Cyler Brogle (2) - pp - 19:17
Christopher Gingras (16 saves / 18 shots)		Goalie stats	Aidan Wysoglad (19 saves / 22 shots)

Fort Wayne wins series 2 – 0

==== New England ====
Quarterfinals (Best-of-3)
1	Islanders Hockey Club	6	4*	-
8	Boston Junior Rangers	3	3	-
2	Springfield Pics	8	4	-
7	Boston Junior Bruins	2	0	-
3	Northern Cyclones	3	4	-
6	Worcester Jr. Railers	2	0	-
4	South Shore Kings	1	3	8
5	Utica Jr. Comets	3	1	2

Semifinals (Best-of-3)
1	Islanders Hockey Club	2	2*	6
4	South Shore Kings	4	1	0
2	Springfield Pics	3	5	-
3	Northern Cyclones	2	1	-

Final (Best-of-3)
1	Islanders Hockey Club	3	2	-
2	Springfield Pics	4*	3*	-

Note: * denotes overtime period(s)

=== New England Quarterfinals ===
==== (1) Islanders Hockey Club vs. (8) Boston Junior Rangers ====
February 27	Islanders Hockey Club	6 – 3	Boston Junior Rangers	Gallant Arena
5:59 - Ethan Fradkin (1); 16:12 - Ethan Brochu (1)		First period	No scoring
0:24 - Edijs Freimanis (1); 6:00 - Nicholas Rooney (1); 13:24 - Dylan Reynolds (1)		Second period	Adam Sawicki (1) - pp - 3:57; Brody Sloan (1) - 9:34; Adam Sawicki (2) - 18:33
2:13 - Ivan Miasoedenkov (1)		Third period	No scoring
Thomas Cafarelli (24 saves / 27 shots)		Goalie stats	Angel Spinelli (33 saves / 39 shots)

March 1	Islanders Hockey Club	4 – 3	OT	Boston Junior Rangers	Gallant Arena
No scoring		First period		Anthony O'Neal (1) - pp - 11:00
5:39 - pp - Scott Allan (1)		Second period		Sean Anderson (1) - 17:03
0:15 - Nicholas Rooney (2); 13:21 - Dylan Reynolds (2)		Third period		Sean Anderson (2) - 19:43
5:31 - pp - Adam Hadi (1)		First overtime period		No scoring
Thomas Cafarelli (26 saves / 29 shots)		Goalie stats		Angel Spinelli (43 saves / 47 shots)

Islanders Hockey Club wins series 2 – 0

==== (2) Springfield Pics vs. (7) Boston Junior Bruins ====
February 28	Springfield Pics	8 – 2	Boston Junior Bruins	Olympia Ice Center
No scoring		First period	No scoring
2:15 - Adam Botlo (1); 6:39 - pp - Maverick Labonté (1); 9:12 - Chris Foster (1); 18:19 - Adam Páleník (1)		Second period	No scoring
7:10 - sh - Maverick Labonté (2); 9:01 - Joey Bisson (1); 10:24 - Maverick Labonté (3); 16:41 - sh - Christian McKinley (1)		Third period	Samuel Sallinen (1) - 3:59; Samuel Sallinen (2) - pp - 12:34
Troy Huber (36 saves / 38 shots)		Goalie stats	Jordan Dumont (38 saves / 44 shots); Alexandre Perrin (0 saves / 2 shots)

March 1	Springfield Pics	4 – 0	Boston Junior Bruins	Olympia Ice Center
No scoring		First period	No scoring
1:52 - Max Christiansen (1); 4:29 - Adam Botlo (2); 14:01 - Nick Zanin (1)		Second period	No scoring
9:57 - pp - Ryan Zabchuk (1)		Third period	No scoring
Troy Huber (27 saves / 27 shots)		Goalie stats	Alexandre Perrin (39 saves / 43 shots)

Springfield wins series 2 – 0

==== (3) Northern Cyclones vs. (6) Worcester Jr. Railers ====
February 28	Northern Cyclones	3 – 2	Worcester Jr. Railers	Cyclones Arena
12:53 - Taylor Casey (1)		First period	No scoring
19:28 - Landon Werner (1)		Second period	Zack Warner-Senee (1) - 16:22
0:32 - Klas Jonsson (1)		Third period	Jaymin Rolfe (1) - 19:58
Cam Prodin (19 saves / 21 shots)		Goalie stats	Matthew Pimentel (53 saves / 56 shots)

March 1	Northern Cyclones	4 – 0	Worcester Jr. Railers	Cyclones Arena
No scoring		First period	No scoring
8:39 - Matthew Taylor (1)		Second period	No scoring
11:56 - pp - Taylor Casey (2); 17:23 - sh - Justin Scarbrough (1); 18:06 - Kyle Roepcke (1)		Third period	No scoring
Ethan Jourden (24 saves / 24 shots)		Goalie stats	Julius Andrekus (49 saves / 53 shots)

Northern wins series 2 – 0

==== (4) South Shore Kings vs. (5) Utica Jr. Comets ====
February 26	South Shore Kings	1 – 3	Utica Jr. Comets	Foxboro Sports Center
No scoring		First period	No scoring
No scoring		Second period	Ayden Zugnoni (1) - 0:35; Cameron Gardiner (1) - 8:22; James DeAngelo (1) - 16:42
18:50 - sh - Payton Kender (1)		Third period	No scoring
Matthew Dore (34 saves / 37 shots)		Goalie stats	Jacob Korte (41 saves / 42 shots)

February 27	South Shore Kings	3 – 1	Utica Jr. Comets	Foxboro Sports Center
No scoring		First period	Garrett Eisenhut (1) - 12:52
6:37 - Kaloyan Stoyanov (1); 9:32 - Maxwell Fleming (1); 16:03 - Alex Dyer (1)		Second period	No scoring
No scoring		Third period	No scoring
Matthew Dore (46 saves / 47 shots)		Goalie stats	Derek Sparks (49 saves / 52 shots)

February 28	South Shore Kings	8 – 2	Utica Jr. Comets	Foxboro Sports Center
Damian Kostadina (1) - 0:51; Payton Kender (2) - 2:09; Anthony Prioli (1) - 7:08; Kaloyan Stoyanov (2) - pp - 17:10		First period	No scoring
Damian Kostadina (2) - 1:03; Daniel Sieto (1) - 14:44		Second period	9:03 - Logan Hull (1); 10:32 - Logan Hull (2)
Alex Dyer (2) - 12:29; Matthew Poirier (1) - 15:18		Third period	No scoring
Matthew Dore (34 saves / 36 shots)		Goalie stats	Jacob Korte (2 saves / 5 shots); Derek Sparks (22 saves / 27 shots)

South Shore wins series 2 – 1

=== New England Semifinals ===
==== (1) Islanders Hockey Club vs. (4) South Shore Kings ====
March 6	Islanders Hockey Club	2 – 4	South Shore Kings	Gallant Arena
14:45 - Owen Young (1)		First period	Daniel Sieto (2) - 8:19
17:57 - Dylan Reynolds (3)		Second period	No scoring
No scoring		Third period	Eison Nee (1) - 0:53; Payton Kender (3) - 15:33; Anthony Prioli (2) - en - 19:14
Thomas Cafarelli (20 saves / 23 shots)		Goalie stats	Matthew Dore (21 saves / 23 shots)

March 7	Islanders Hockey Club	2 – 1	OT	South Shore Kings	Gallant Arena
12:16 - Edijs Freimanis (2)		First period		Eison Nee (2) - 7:16
No scoring		Second period		No scoring
No scoring		Third period		No scoring
5:53 - Edijs Freimanis (3)		First overtime period		No scoring
Jake Henry (27 saves / 28 shots)		Goalie stats		Matthew Dore (51 saves / 53 shots)

March 9	Islanders Hockey Club	6 – 0	South Shore Kings	Gallant Arena
Hamilton Nordwind (1) - 5:59		First period	No scoring
Jack Roberts (1) - 14:40		Second period	No scoring
Ethan Fradkin (2) - 4:34; Nick Therrien (1) - 14:30; Edijs Freimanis (4) - 15:46; Parker Stepien (1) - 16:40		Third period	No scoring
Jake Henry (21 saves / 21 shots)		Goalie stats	Matthew Dore (52 saves / 58 shots)

Islanders win series 2 – 1

==== (2) Springfield Pics vs. (3) Northern Cyclones ====
March 7	Springfield Pics	3 – 2	Northern Cyclones	Olympia Ice Center
3:17 - Maverick Labonté (4)		First period	No scoring
No scoring		Second period	Trevor Belak (1) - sh - 16:20; Trevor Belak (2) - 17:54
8:57 - pp - Frédéric D'Amours (1); 15:49 - Jacob Carey (1)		Third period	No scoring
Troy Huber (32 saves / 34 shots)		Goalie stats	Cam Prodin (40 saves / 43 shots)

March 8	Springfield Pics	5 – 1	Northern Cyclones	Olympia Ice Center
No scoring		First period	No scoring
3:36 - Maverick Labonté (5)		Second period	No scoring
10:28 - pp - Chris Foster (2); 4:19 - Justin Hooper (1); 17:33 - sh - Maverick Labonté (6); 19:26 - Jacob Carey (2)		Third period	Landon Werner (2) - pp - 2:33
Troy Huber (41 saves / 42 shots)		Goalie stats	Ethan Jourden (42 saves / 47 shots)

Springfield wins series 2 – 0

==== (1) Islanders Hockey Club vs. (2) Springfield Pics ====
March 13	Islanders Hockey Club	3 – 4	OT	Springfield Pics	Gallant Arena
3:44 - David Ros (1); 10:11 - Ethan Fradkin (3)		First period		No scoring
0:51 - pp - Jack Roberts (2)		Second period		Christian McKinley (1) - 6:55
No scoring		Third period		Levi Adcock (1) - 0:29; Nick Zanin (2) - 1:23
No scoring		First overtime period		Adam Botlo (3) - 7:46
Jake Henry (31 saves / 35 shots)		Goalie stats		Troy Huber (29 saves / 32 shots)

March 14	Islanders Hockey Club	2 – 3	OT	Springfield Pics	Gallant Arena
19:00 - Ethan Brochu (2)		First period		Jacob Carey (3) - 0:25; Ryan Zabchuk (2) - 0:44
16:24 - pp - Ivan Miasoedenkov (2)		Second period		No scoring
No scoring		Third period		No scoring
No scoring		First overtime period		Maverick Labonté (7) - 6:43
Jake Henry (0 saves / 2 shots); Thomas Cafarelli (36 saves / 37 shots)		Goalie stats		Troy Huber (37 saves / 39 shots)

Springfield wins series 2 – 0

==== North ====
Quarterfinals (Best-of-3)
1	Minnesota Squatch	7	12	-
8	Isanti Outlaws	1	0	-
2	Wisconsin Rapids RiverKings	3	6	-
7	Steele County Blades	0	2	-
3	Northwest Express	4	3	-
6	Minnesota Blue Ox	1	2	-
4	Minnesota Mullets	2	2	4
5	Dells Ducks	1	3	0

Semifinals (Best-of-3)
1	Minnesota Squatch	5*	10	-
4	Minnesota Mullets	4	4	-
2	Wisconsin Rapids RiverKings	5	3	7
3	Northwest Express	2	4*	2

Final (Best-of-3)
1	Minnesota Squatch	2*	5	-
2	Wisconsin Rapids RiverKings	1	2	-

Note: * denotes overtime period(s)

=== North Quarterfinals ===
==== (1) Minnesota Squatch vs. (8) Isanti Outlaws ====
February 28	Minnesota Squatch	7 – 1	Isanti Outlaws	Furniture and Things Community Event Center
5:25 - Sergei Kolesov (1)		First period	Brandon Bennett (1) - 11:33
7:30 - Jacob Bodin (1); 8:52 - Danylo Tsybulskyi (1); 15:41 - Alec Bjork (1)		Second period	No scoring
3:57 - Joe Lewis (1); 12:05 - Sergei Kolesov (2); 19:06 - Lukas Plank (1)		Third period	No scoring
Anyon Bennett (26 saves / 27 shots)		Goalie stats	Charles Healey (52 saves / 59 shots)

March 1	Minnesota Squatch	12 – 0	Isanti Outlaws	Furniture and Things Community Event Center
0:21 - Nikita Schneider (1); 2:26 - Ian Nelson (1)		First period	No scoring
0:27 - Lukas Plank (2); 2:18 - pp - Jay Ellingson (1); 2:52 - Grant O'Connor (1); 5:28 - pp - Nikita Schneider (2); 12:53 - Danylo Tsybulskyi (2); 14:50 - sh - Cannon Bonifay (1); 17:01 - pp - Joe Lewis (2)		Second period	No scoring
0:51 - sh - Grant O'Connor (2); 10:38 - Michael Golosinski (1); 13:21 - Joe Lewis (3)		Third period	No scoring
Andrew Finneman (27 saves / 27 shots)		Goalie stats	Charles Healey (20 saves / 25 shots); Joel Gerard (1 save / 6 shots); Casey Vinti (0 saves / 2 shots)

Minnesota wins series 2 – 0

==== (2) Wisconsin Rapids RiverKings vs. (7) Steele County Blades ====
February 28	Wisconsin Rapids RiverKings	3 – 0	Steele County Blades	South Wood County Recreation Center
3:03 - Mikhail Ilyin (1)		First period	No scoring
6:44 - pp - Francesco Carlo Denti (1); 12:10 - Emil Obstfelder (1)		Second period	No scoring
No scoring		Third period	No scoring
Dominic Hite (17 saves / 17 shots)		Goalie stats	James Hunt (43 saves / 46 shots)

March 1	Wisconsin Rapids RiverKings	6 – 2	Steele County Blades	South Wood County Recreation Center
4:09 - Hogan McNeish (1); 18:48 - Felix Gulbransen Ahlstrand (1)		First period	Tyler Hadfield (1) - 9:31; Peyton Inks (1) - 11:23
5:31 - Jacob Bryceland (1); 12:38 - Emil Obstfelder (2); 16:05 - Cayden Sweitzer (1)		Second period	No scoring
18:07 - Bryce Cooper (1)		Third period	No scoring
Guillaume Turcot (19 saves / 21 shots)		Goalie stats	Noah Hacker (49 saves / 55 shots)

Wisconsin wins series 2 – 0

==== (3) Northwest Express vs. (6) Minnesota Blue Ox ====
February 28	Northwest Express	4 – 1	Minnesota Blue Ox	Spooner Civic Center
No scoring		First period	No scoring
15:37 - Otis Berge (1)		Second period	Gordy Lawson (1) - 18:47
12:45 - Preston Lundbohm (1); 11:51 - Otis Berge (2); 12:45 - Andrew Winter (1)		Third period	No scoring
Rylan Freshwater (22 saves / 23 shots)		Goalie stats	Jackson Clough (38 saves / 42 shots)

March 1	Northwest Express	3 – 2	Minnesota Blue Ox	Spooner Civic Center
No scoring		First period	No scoring
No scoring		Second period	Jayden White (1) - sh - 18:12
8:56 - pp - Otis Berge (3); 16:46 - Harrison Browning (1); 17:33 - Eli Underhill (1)		Third period	Jace Lombardo (1) - pp - 19:15
Rylan Freshwater (32 saves / 34 shots)		Goalie stats	Jackson Clough (33 saves / 36 shots)

Northwest wins series 2 – 0

==== (4) Minnesota Mullets vs. (5) Dells Ducks ====
March 1	Minnesota Mullets	2 – 1	Dells Ducks	Augsburg Ice Arena
No scoring		First period	Jack Gardner (1) - sh - 2:20
2:58 - pp - Cyril Valach (1)		Second period	No scoring
16:07 - pp - Mitchell Nelson (1)		Third period	No scoring
Kody Niederkorn (32 saves / 33 shots)		Goalie stats	Maximilian Pierce (27 saves / 29 shots)

March 2	Minnesota Mullets	2 – 3	Dells Ducks	Augsburg Ice Arena
No scoring		First period	No scoring
16:36 - Cyril Valach (2); 18:07 - Tommy Perkins (1)		Second period	Quinten Clausen (1) - 3:06; Andrew Engstrom (1) - 16:23; Derrand Wilcox (1) - 18:46
No scoring		Third period	No scoring
Kody Niederkorn (27 saves / 30 shots)		Goalie stats	Maximilian Pierce (46 saves / 48 shots)

March 3	Minnesota Mullets	4 – 0	Dells Ducks	Augsburg Ice Arena
Dylan Herold (1) - 19:06		First period	No scoring
Hudson Dilworth (1) - 10:04; Tommy Perkins (2) - pp - 17:35		Second period	No scoring
Cyril Valach (3) - pp - 19:54		Third period	No scoring
Kody Niederkorn (32 saves / 32 shots)		Goalie stats	Maximilian Pierce (34 saves / 38 shots)

Minnesota wins series 2 – 1

=== North Semifinals ===
==== (1) Minnesota Squatch vs. (4) Minnesota Mullets ====
March 7	Minnesota Squatch	5 – 4	OT	Minnesota Mullets	Furniture and Things Community Event Center
15:03 - Joe Lewis (4)		First period		No scoring
7:40 - Jay Ellingson (2); 17:54 - Danylo Tsybulskyi (3)		Second period		Cole Taylor (1) - 14:24
16:40 - Jacob Sinclair (1)		Third period		Hudson Dilworth (2) - 1:42; Jovan Fowler (1) - 13:45; Tommy Perkins (3) - 16:01
11:43 - Lukas Plank (3)		First overtime period		No scoring
Anyon Bennett (36 saves / 40 shots)		Goalie stats		Kody Niederkorn (52 saves / 57 shots)

March 8	Minnesota Squatch	10 – 4	Minnesota Mullets	Furniture and Things Community Event Center
1:44 - Cannon Bonifay (2); 3:59 - Nikita Schneider (3); 4:42 - Cannon Bonifay (3); 12:59 - Jay Ellingson (3)		First period	Mitchell Nelson (2) - pp - 8:54; Tommy Perkins (4) - 14:51; Max Young (1) - 15:31
4:54 - pp - Matthias Mader (1); 10:28 - Colin Leeb (1)		Second period	Franklin Loo (1) - 8:04
2:06 - Cannon Bonifay (4); 14:07 - Jeb Gould (1); 17:35 - Grant O'Connor (3); 18:33 - Sergei Kolesov (3)		Third period	No scoring
Anyon Bennett (33 saves / 37 shots)		Goalie stats	Kody Niederkorn (40 saves / 50 shots)

Squatch wins series 2 – 0

==== (2) Wisconsin Rapids RiverKings vs. (3) Northwest Express ====
March 7	Wisconsin Rapids RiverKings	5 – 2	Northwest Express	South Wood County Recreation Center

March 8	Wisconsin Rapids RiverKings	3 – 4	OT	Northwest Express	South Wood County Recreation Center

March 9	Wisconsin Rapids RiverKings	7 – 2	Northwest Express	South Wood County Recreation Center

Wisconsin wins series 2 – 1

=== North Finals ===
==== (1) Minnesota Squatch vs. (2) Wisconsin Rapids RiverKings ====
March 14	Minnesota Squatch	2 – 1	OT	Wisconsin Rapids RiverKings	Furniture and Things Community Event Center

March 15	Minnesota Squatch	5 – 2	Wisconsin Rapids RiverKings	Furniture and Things Community Event Center

Minnesota wins series 2 – 0

==== Northwest ====
Semifinals (Best-of-3)
1	Vernal Oilers	18	11	-
4	Iron County Yeti	1	0	-
2	Seattle Totems	3	5	-
3	Bellingham Blazers	1	2	-

Final (Best-of-3)
1	Vernal Oilers	5	6	-
2	Seattle Totems	2	1	-

Note: * denotes overtime period(s)

=== Northwest Semifinals ===
==== (1) Vernal Oilers vs. (4) Iron County Yeti ====
February 28	Vernal Oilers	18 – 1	Iron County Yeti	Western Park Ice Rink
6:35 - Roni Alanko (1); 8:46 - Kai Tsoar (1); 12:49 - Roni Alanko (2)		First period	No scoring
1:51 - Gergö Schwartz (1); 3:45 - pp - Dominik Griessmer (1); 5:39 - pp - Luke Jimenez (1); 10:25 - Jett McCullum (1); 11:48 - Luke Jimenez (2); 17:26 - Gavin Mears (1); 19:22 - Presley Toth (1)		Second period	No scoring
0:19 - Sami Kallionkieli (1); 2:04 - Gergö Schwartz (2); 4:01 - pp - Sami Kallionkieli (2); 4:19 - Jett McCullum (2); 4:38 - Nick Moore (1); 7:00 - Sami Kallionkieli (3); 18:11 - Seungpyo Cho (1); 19:50 - Cayden Shields (1)		Third period	Junsang Park (1) - 13:22
Levente Hegedüs (18 saves / 19 shots)		Goalie stats	Mason Bouchard (41 saves / 49 shots); Corbin Dugan (24 saves / 34 shots)

March 1	Vernal Oilers	11 – 0	Iron County Yeti	Western Park Ice Rink
1:59 - Kasper Pohjala (1); 12:20 - Roni Alanko (3)		First period	No scoring
1:51 - Roni Alanko (4); 6:33 - Roni Alanko (5); 7:38 - Jett McCullum (3); 9:20 - Cayden Shields (2); 12:18 - Presley Toth (2)		Second period	No scoring
1:19 - Roni Alanko (6); 9:19 - Kasper Pohjala (2); 12:04 - Nick Moore (2); 19:05 - pp - Jett McCullum (4)		Third period	No scoring
Tyrus Pratley (8 saves / 8 shots)		Goalie stats	Mason Bouchard (55 saves / 66 shots)

Vernal wins series 2 – 0

==== (2) Seattle Totems vs. (3) Bellingham Blazers ====
February 28	Seattle Totems	3 – 1	Bellingham Blazers	Olympic View Arena
No scoring		First period	No scoring
1:00 - Aatu Suontakanen (1); 16:04 - Kieran Maloney (1)		Second period	Toby Odushkin (1) - 10:55
7:34 - Kieran Maloney (2)		Third period	No scoring
Cole Fennema (24 saves / 25 shots)		Goalie stats	Emmett Dixon (59 saves / 62 shots)

March 1	Seattle Totems	5 – 2	Bellingham Blazers	Olympic View Arena
8:39 - Matiass Daniels Grinbergs (1); 9:29 - Roman Wolynec (1)		First period	No scoring
No scoring		Second period	No scoring
9:18 - Aatu Suontakanen (2); 16:21 - Kori Belanger (1); 19:06 - Roman Wolynec (2)		Third period	Luc Desjardins (1) - 9:45; Toby Odushkin (2) - 18:34
Cole Fennema (22 saves / 24 shots)		Goalie stats	Emmett Dixon (60 saves / 65 shots)

Seattle wins series 2 – 0

=== Northwest Finals ===
==== (1) Vernal Oilers vs. (2) Seattle Totems ====
March 7	Vernal Oilers	5 – 2	Seattle Totems	Western Park Ice Rink
1:59 - Presley Toth (3); 9:56 - pp - Gergö Schwartz (3); 16:14 - pp - Filip Lezzani (1)		First period	Roman Wolynec (3) - 1:59
17:24 - Rodion Gornostayev (1)		Second period	No scoring
2:31 - pp - Kasper Pohjala (3)		Third period	Oleksandr Kurzenkov (1) - 17:40
Levente Hegedüs (29 saves / 31 shots)		Goalie stats	Cole Fennema (37 saves / 42 shots)

March 8	Vernal Oilers	6 – 1	Seattle Totems	Western Park Ice Rink
9:56 - pp - Filip Lezzani (1); 16:20 - pp - Gergö Schwartz (4)		First period	No scoring
2:39 - Kai Tsoar (2); 17:52 - Logan Powers (1)		Second period	No scoring
14:18 - Gergö Schwartz (5); 15:03 - pp - Henry Newell (1)		Third period	Kieran Maloney (2) - pp - 2:34
Levente Hegedüs (25 saves / 26 shots)		Goalie stats	Daniel Cleofe (16 saves / 20 shots); Cole Fennema (14 saves / 16 shots)

Vernal wins series 2 – 0

==== Pacific ====
Semifinals (Best-of-3)
1	Fresno Monsters	4	5	-
4	Henderson Force	2	1	-
2	Lake Tahoe Lakers	3	2	-
3	Ontario Jr. Reign	6	8	-

Final (Best-of-3)
1	Fresno Monsters	5	7	-
3	Ontario Jr. Reign	2	4	-

Note: * denotes overtime period(s)

==== Southeast ====
First Round (Best-of-1)
1	Charlotte Rush	4
4	Carolina Jr. Hurricanes	1
Winner's bracket
2	Hampton Roads Whalers	0
3	Potomac Patriots	4
2	Hampton Roads Whalers	5
4	Carolina Jr. Hurricanes	2
Loser's bracket

Semifinal (Best-of-1)
1	Charlotte Rush	0
3	Potomac Patriots	2
2	Hampton Roads Whalers	4
1	Charlotte Rush	1

Final (Best-of-1)
3	Potomac Patriots	5*
2	Hampton Roads Whalers	4

Note: * denotes overtime period(s)

=== National Round ===
March 20 – March 24
Due to the imbalanced nature of the schedule, the 10 qualifying teams were ranked as follows:

Seed	Team	Pts	Division
1	Vernal Oilers	88	Northwest
2	Fresno Monsters	74	Pacific
3	Metro Jets	72	Great Lakes
4	Tampa Bay Juniors	68	Florida
5	Springfield Pics	68	New England
6	Potomac Patriots	62	Southeast
7	Fort Wayne Spacemen	69	Midwest
8	Minnesota Squatch	74	North
9	P.A.L. Jr. Islanders	50	Atlantic
10	Universel Sherbrooke	49	Canada

The teams were then divided into two separate pools (Division 1 and Division 2)

Division 1

Seed	Team	Pts	Division
2	Fresno Monsters	74	Pacific
3	Metro Jets	72	Great Lakes
4	Tampa Bay Juniors	68	Florida
5	Springfield Pics	68	New England
8	Minnesota Squatch	74	North
9	P.A.L. Jr. Islanders	50	Atlantic

Division 2

Seed	Team	Pts	Division
1	Vernal Oilers	88	Northwest
6	Potomac Patriots	62	Southeast
7	Fort Wayne Spacemen	69	Midwest
10	Universel Sherbrooke	49	Canada

The two pools then played separate round-robin series with the top two finishers in each Division advancing to the national semifinals. Each team would play three games regardless of the number of opponents in their respective divisions.
Ties were broken first by head-to-head matches and then by goal differential.

==== Division 1 ====
		FRE	MET	TBJ	SPR	MIN	PAL
1	Fresno Monsters			4–5	4–2		5–8
2	Metro Jets			2–1	0–6		2–0
3	Tampa Bay Juniors	5–4	1–2			5–2	
4	Springfield Pics	2–4	6–0			9–4	
5	Minnesota Squatch			2–5	4–9		1–5
6	P.A.L. Jr. Islanders	8–5	0–2			5–1	

Scores in italics denote overtime or shootout finish

Standings

Team	W	OTW	OTL	L	Pts	GF	GA	DIF
Tampa Bay Juniors	2	0	1	0	7	11	8	+3
Springfield Pics	2	0	0	1	6	17	8	+9
P.A.L. Jr. Islanders	2	0	0	1	6	13	8	+5
Metro Jets	1	1	0	1	5	4	7	-3
Fresno Monsters	1	0	0	2	3	13	14	-2
Minnesota Squatch	0	0	0	3	0	7	19	-12

==== Division 2 ====
		VER	POT	FWS	CUS
1	Vernal Oilers		3–4	4–0	7–3
2	Potomac Patriots	4–3		4–5	5–1
3	Fort Wayne Spacemen	0–4	5–4		9–0
4	Universel Sherbrooke	3–7	1–5	0–9	

Scores in italics denote overtime or shootout finish

Standings

Team	W	OTW	OTL	L	Pts	GF	GA	DIF
Potomac Patriots	2	0	1	0	7	13	9	+4
Vernal Oilers	2	0	0	1	6	14	7	+7
Fort Wayne Spacemen	1	1	0	1	5	14	8	+6
Universel Sherbrooke	0	0	0	3	0	4	21	-17

=== March 20 ===
Springfield Pics	9 – 4	Minnesota Squatch	Ice Vault Arena

Metro Jets	4 – 3	SO	Tampa Bay Juniors	Ice Vault Arena

Fresno Monsters	5 – 8	P.A.L. Jr. Islanders	Ice Vault Arena

Potomac Patriots	4 – 5	OT	Fort Wayne Spacemen	Ice Vault Arena
19:14 - pp - Bryce Grandbois (5)	First period		No scoring
2:48 - Alexander Kharinov (1); 18:50 - pp - Bryce Grandbois (6)	Second period		Ivan Barnashov (3) - pp - 5:02; Alexis Toussaint (4) - 8:40
5:51 - Bryce Grandbois (7)	Third period		Jace Lacey (3) - 2:00; Bogdan Vysotsky (2) - 13:40
No scoring	First overtime period		Ivan Barnashov (4) - 0:20
Viggo Boston (29 saves / 34 shots)	Goalie stats		Christopher Gingras (27 saves / 31 shots)

Vernal Oilers	7 – 3	Universel Sherbrooke	Ice Vault Arena
2:44 - Kasper Pohjala (4); 3:00 - Sami Kallionkieli (3); 16:58 - sh - Gergö Schwartz (6)	First period	Charles-Étienne Normandin (1) - 4:01
8:11 - Kai Tsoar (3); 11:13 - pp - Roni Alanko (7); 16:40 - Roni Alanko (8)	Second period	Victor Proulx (6) - 0:07
5:39 - Nick Moore (3)	Third period	Arthur Sevigny (2) - 9:13
Michael Marandola (15 saves / 18 shots)	Goalie stats	Alexis Cloutier (26 saves / 31 shots); Carlo Giordani (8 saves / 10 shots)

=== March 21 ===
Tampa Bay Juniors	5 – 2	Minnesota Squatch	Ice Vault Arena

Metro Jets	2 – 0	P.A.L. Jr. Islanders	Ice Vault Arena

Fresno Monsters	4 – 2	Springfield Pics	Ice Vault Arena
10:18 - pp - Sebastian Westerlund (2); 15:35 - Filipp Papshev (9)	First period	No scoring
9:43 - Owen Cross (1)	Second period	Travis Raisanen (2) - 16:41
19:20 - sh - en - Nils Tunbratt (3)	Third period	Adam Botlo (5) - pp - 11:18
Brooks Barofsky (47 saves / 49 shots)	Goalie stats	Troy Huber (16 saves / 19 shots)

Potomac Patriots	5 – 1	Universel Sherbrooke	Ice Vault Arena

Vernal Oilers	4 – 0	Fort Wayne Spacemen	Ice Vault Arena
5:27 - Kai Tsoar (4)	First period	No scoring
6:54 - pp - Roni Alanko (9); 10:07 - sh - Gergö Schwartz (7)	Second period	No scoring
14:38 - Sami Kallionkieli (4)	Third period	No scoring
Levente Hegedüs (23 saves / 23 shots)	Goalie stats	Christopher Gingras (30 saves / 34 shots)

=== March 22 ===
Fort Wayne Spacemen	9 – 0	Universel Sherbrooke	Ice Vault Arena
2:09 - Ivan Khirsa (4); 19:37 - Brody Vachon (1)	First period	No scoring
10:35 - pp - Jace Lacey (4); 12:16 - pp - Ivan Khirsa (5); 19:24 - Bogdan Vysotsky (3)	Second period	No scoring
7:58 - pp - Bogdan Vysotsky (4); 8:37 - Antoine Bonin (1); 9:04 - Broderik Burge (2); 14:01 - Bogdan Vysotsky (5)	Third period	No scoring
Christopher Gingras (24 saves / 24 shots)	Goalie stats	Simon Thibault (47 saves / 56 shots)

Minnesota Squatch	1 – 5	P.A.L. Jr. Islanders	Ice Vault Arena
6:20 - Jay Ellingston (6)	First period	Chris O'Hea (1) - 12:07
No scoring	Second period	Brett LoGelfo (7) - 1:48
No scoring	Third period	Joseph Sousa (9) - 7:44; James Clifford (8) - 12:49; William Prange (7) - en - 15:50
Andrew Finneman (12 saves / 14 shots); A. J. Smith (7 saves / 9 shots)	Goalie stats	Avery Hite (26 saves / 27 shots)

Fresno Monsters	4 – 5	Tampa Bay Juniors	Ice Vault Arena
4:08 - pp - Tyson Baumbach (1); 19:10 - Simon Eriksson (3)	First period	Ari Blatt (1) - 4:57; Jakub Koudelný (3) - 10:12
16:47 - Connor Perdue (5)	Second period	No scoring
4:09 - Adrian Gomez (2)	Third period	Jason Johnson (5) - pp - 15:39; Onni Puikkonen (2) - 17:27; Augie Ashley (2) - sh - en - 19:55
Brooks Barofsky (39 saves / 43 shots)	Goalie stats	Nate Galbraith (29 saves / 33 shots)

Vernal Oilers	3 – 4	Potomac Patriots	Ice Vault Arena
0:41 - Marsel Tynymbayev (1)	First period	Alexander Kharinov (2) - pp - 4:40
No scoring	Second period	Matvei Naumov (2) - 4:13; Yovanni Flores (1) - 18:56
5:53 - Klim Kudryashov (1); 8:04 - Rodion Gornostaev (3)	Third period	Conner Nieto (1) - 6:24
Levente Hegedüs (29 saves / 33 shots)	Goalie stats	Viggo Boston (37 saves / 40 shots)

Metro Jets	0 – 6	Springfield Pics	Ice Vault Arena
No scoring	First period	No scoring
No scoring	Second period	Jacob Carey (4) - 0:12; Chris Foster (3) - 0:28; Ryan Zabchuk (5) - 3:57; Christian McKinley (3) - 9:40
No scoring	Third period	River Sciarrotta (1) - 9:40; Jacob Carey (5) - 15:46
Rostislav Efremov (24 saves / 28 shots); Austin Muirhead (5 saves / 6 shots)	Goalie stats	Troy Huber (37 saves / 37 shots)

==== Championship round ====
Semifinals (March 23)
F	Tampa Bay Juniors	3
NW	Vernal Oilers	7
SE	Potomac Patriots	4
NE	Springfield Pics	5*

Championship (March 24)
NW	Vernal Oilers	6
NE	Springfield Pics	2

Note: * denotes overtime period(s)

=== Semifinals ===
==== (1) Vernal Oilers vs. (4) Tampa Bay Juniors ====
March 23	Tampa Bay Juniors	3 – 7	Vernal Oilers	Ice Vault Arena
Eppu Tervamäki (2) - pp - 13:21		First period	1:07 - Rodion Gornostaev (3); 4:39 - Dominik Griessmer (2); 9:25 - Roni Alanko (10); 13:56 - Sami Kallionkieli (6)
Jakub Koudelný (4) - 8:22		Second period	0:46 - Sami Kallionkieli (7)
Jackson Henningsgaard (1) - pp - 18:14		Third period	4:49 - Jett McCullum (5); 8:14 - Roni Alanko (11)
Savva Serdiuk (5 saves / 9 shots); Nate Galbraith (8 saves / 11 shots)		Goalie stats	Levente Hegedüs (24 saves / 27 shots)

==== (5) Springfield Pics vs. (6) Potomac Patriots ====
March 23	Potomac Patriots	4 – 5	OT	Springfield Pics	Ice Vault Arena
Nikolai Kharinov (4) - 1:51; Illia Biesiedin (1) - 16:10; Matvei Naumov (3) - 17:23		First period		0:15 - Jacob Carey (6)
No scoring		Second period		9:56 - pp - Levi Adcock (3)
Hayden Ritter (2) - 13:01		Third period		8:24 - pp - Ryan Zabchuk (6); 18:54 - Jacob Carey (7)
No scoring		First overtime period		10:23 - Frédéric D'Amours (2)
Kirill Guryev (50 saves / 55 shots)		Goalie stats		Troy Huber (37 saves / 41 shots)

=== Finals ===
==== (1) Vernal Oilers vs. (5) Springfield Pics ====
March 24	Springfield Pics	2 – 6	Vernal Oilers	Ice Vault Arena
No scoring		First period	No scoring
Levi Adcock (4) - pp - 7:40		Second period	No scoring
Frédéric D'Amours (3) - 6:40		Third period	2:01 - pp - Dominik Griessmer (3); 3:31 - pp - Kai Tsoar (5); 10:41 - Gergö Schwartz (8); 10:57 - Jakub Bulik (1); 12:32 - pp - Roni Alanko (12); 13:33 - pp - Rodion Gornostaev (4)
Troy Huber (42 saves / 48 shots)		Goalie stats	Levente Hegedüs (20 saves / 22 shots)
