= Tampa Bay Juniors =

- City: Ellenton, Florida
- League: United States Premier Hockey League; Premier Division
- Division: Florida
- Founded: 2008
- Home arena: Ellenton Ice and Sports Complex
- Colors: Blue and white

Franchise history
- 2008–2010: Jacksonville IceDogs
- 2008–2011: Tampa Bay Bolts
- 2011–present: Tampa Bay Juniors

Championships
- Division titles: 2010, 2018, 2025

The Tampa Bay Juniors are a Tier III junior ice hockey team playing in the United States Premier Hockey League's (USPHL) Premier Division. The Juniors play their home games at the Ellenton Ice and Sports Complex in Ellenton, Florida.

== History ==
In 2008, the Tampa Bay Bolts were founded as a junior team playing out of the Southeast Junior Hockey League. That same year, the Jacksonville Ice Dogs were also founded as members of the Metropolitan Junior Hockey League. In 2010, the Ice Dogs relocated to the Tampa Bay area and merged with the Bolts. A year later, the club rebranded as the Tampa Bay Juniors with the now-unified club following the rest of the SEJHL teams into the EJHL South, now a division of the Eastern Junior Hockey League.

In 2013, junior hockey in America saw a sizable amount of realignment. All of the teams from the EJHL South left to join the newly-formed United States Premier Hockey League in the Elite division. Additionally, the club also founded a second developmental team that played out of the Empire Division. In 2016, the USPHL announced plans to found a Tier II division beginning with the 2017–18 season. The decision resulted in the league dissolving the Empire Division (which had been renamed US3PHL) as well as encouraging many of its lower-level teams to promote themselves. The Junior were one of several dozen clubs to take advantage of this change and become a full Tier III club for the first time, joining the Premier Division in 2017.

== Season-by-season records ==
=== Tampa Bay Bolts ===
Season	GP	W	L	T	OTL	Pts	GF	GA	Regular season finish	Playoffs
Southeast Junior Hockey League
2008–09	24	6	16	0	2	14	67	135	7th of 8, SEJHL	Missing information
2009–10	28	14	14	0	0	28	100	91	4th of 7, SEJHL	Lost Round Robin Championship (0–3–0)
2010–11	33	12	21	0	0	24	111	182	3rd of 5, SEJHL	Did not qualify

=== Jacksonville Ice Dogs/Tampa Bay Bolts ===
Season	GP	W	L	OTL	Pts	GF	GA	Regular season finish	Playoffs
Metropolitan Junior Hockey League
2008–09	34	25	8	1	51	210	83	4th of 10, Southern Div. 12th of 28, MJHL	Won Round Robin Div. Quarterfinal, ? Won Div. Semifinal, ? (Atlanta Jr. Knights); Won Div. Final, ? (Hampton Roads Whalers); Won Keegan Cup Semifinal, ? (Walpole Express); Lost Keegan Cup Championship, ? (Central Penn Panthers)
2009–10	35	25	9	1	51	199	120	1st of 5, Florida Div. t-7th of 23, MJHL	Lost Div. Preliminary, 0–2 (Florida Eels); Won Div. Elimination game, 4–3 (Palm Beach Hawks); Won Div. Final, 3–0 (Florida Eels); Lost Keegan Cup Quarterfinal, 4–5 (OT) (Suffolk Juniors); Lost Fifth place game, 2–4 (Long Island Royals)
2010–11	37	17	18	2	36	137	157	4th of 8, Southern Div. 14th of 25, MJHL	Missing information

=== Tampa Bay Juniors ===
Season	GP	W	L	OTL	Pts	GF	GA	Regular season finish	Playoffs
EJHL South
2011–12	40	19	19	2	40	162	205	4th of 8, EJHL South; 19th of 29, EJHL	Won Div. Preliminary, 6–4 (Hampton Roads Whalers); Lost Div. Semifinal, 2–5 (Atlanta Jr. Knights); Lost Elimination game, 0–12 (Florida Jr. Blades)
2012–13	40	19	17	4	42	189	132	4th of 9, EJHL South; 16th of 31, EJHL	Did not qualify
USPHL Elite
2013–14	40	18	17	5	41	145	151	t-4th of 8, Southern Conf. t-9th of 18, USPHL Elite	Won First Round series, 2–0 (Palm Beach Hawks); Lost Quarterfinal series, 1–2 (Florida Eels)
2014–15	40	22	14	4	48	139	121	4th of 9, South Div. 8th of 18, USPHL Elite	Won Div. Quarterfinal series, 2–1 (Florida Eels); Won Div. Semifinal series, 2–1 (Atlanta Jr. Knights); Lost Final Four Round-Robin, 3–2 (Hampton Roads Whalers), 0–4 (Boston Junior Bruins), 1–11 (Syracuse Stars)
2015–16	40	9	28	3	21	114	194	9th of 10, South Div. 17th of 20, USPHL Elite	Did not qualify
2016–17	44	23	19	2	48	184	151	5th of 9, Southern Div. 15th of 27, USPHL Elite	Lost Div. Quarterfinal series, 0–2 (Florida Eels)
USPHL Premier
2017–18	44	30	13	1	61	231	168	1st of 5, Florida Div. t-10th of 44, USPHL Premier	Won Div. Semifinal series, 2–0 (Florida Jr. Blades); Lost Pool Gold Round Robin, 1–6 (Hampton Roads Whalers), 1–4 (Minnesota Moose), 3–2 (Northern Cyclones)
2018–19	44	15	24	5	35	121	165	3rd of 5, Florida Div. t-38th of 52, USPHL Premier	Lost Div. Semifinal series, 1–2 (Florida Eels)
2019–20	44	21	20	3	45	173	151	2nd of 5, Florida Div. t-29th of 52, USPHL Premier	Won Div. Semifinal series, 2–0 (Charleston Colonials); Remainder of postseason cancelled
2020–21	44	29	13	2	60	182	144	2nd of 5, Florida Div. t-15th of 62, USPHL Premier	Lost Div. Semifinal series, 1–2 (Charleston Colonials)
2021–22	44	31	10	3	65	186	128	2nd of 5, Florida Div. t-11th of 64, USPHL Premier	Lost Div. Semifinal series, 1–2 (Florida Jr. Blades)
2022–23	44	25	18	1	51	151	146	3rd of 6, Florida Div. t-32nd of 70, USPHL Premier	Won Div. Semifinal series, 2–0 (Atlanta Mad Hatters); Won Seeding Round with scores of, 0–4 (Northern Cyclones), 4–2 (Las Vegas Thunderbirds); Lost Eighthfinal, 1–5 (Wilkes-Barre/Scranton Knights)
2023–24	44	28	16	0	56	154	142	3rd of 6, Florida Div. 24th of 61, USPHL Premier	Lost Div. Semifinal series, 1–2 (Florida Eels)
2024–25	42	33	7	2	68	228	108	1st of 6, Florida Div. t-11th of 73, USPHL Premier	Won Div. First Round, 3–0 (Florida Jr. Blades); Won' Div. Winners Semifinal, 4–0 (Florida Eels); Won' Div. Final, 3–2 (Bold City Battalion); Won' Division 1 Round-Robin, 5–4 (Fresno Monsters), 1–2 (OT) (Metro Jets), 5–2 (Minnesota Squatch); Lost Semifinal, 3–7 (Vernal Oilers)
2025–26	44	25	18	1	51	174	134	3rd of 5, Florida Div. 35th of 77, USPHL Premier	Won Div. Semifinal, 2-1 (Florida Eels); Lost Div Finals, 1-2 (Coral Springs Jr. Cats)
