= West Chester Wolves (Tier III) =

- City: West Chester, Pennsylvania
- League: United States Premier Hockey League; Premier Division
- Division: Atlantic
- Founded: 2024
- Home arena: PNY Sports Arena
- Colors: Purple, white, and black
- Head coach: Brian Leonard
- Affiliates: West Chester Wolves

Franchise history
- 2024–present: West Chester Wolves

The West Chester Wolves are a Tier III junior ice hockey team playing in the United States Premier Hockey League's (USPHL) Premier Division. The Wolves play their home games at PNY Sports Arena in West Chester, Pennsylvania.

== History ==
On March 22, 2024, the USPHL announced the addition of the West Chester Wolves to the top division of play (National Collegiate Development Conference). The organization also was approved to add a Tier III affiliate to Premier Division at the same time.

== Season-by-season records ==
Season	GP	W	L	OTL	Pts	GF	GA	Regular season finish	Playoffs
2024–25	44	27	11	6	60	152	104	t-3rd of 11, Atlantic Div. 22nd of 73, USPHL Premier	Lost Div. Quarterfinal series, 0–2 (Rockets Hockey Club)
2025–26	44	36	6	2	74	243	85	1st of 10, Atlantic Div. 7th of 77, USPHL Premier	Won Div. Quarterfinal series, 2-0 (Hersey Cubs); Won Div Semifinal 2-0 (P.A.L. Jr. Islanders); Won Div Finals 2-1 (Connecticut Jr. Rangers (Tier III)); National Pool 1 Round Robin; Lost Game 4-5(ot) (Minnesota Squatch); Lost Game 1-5 (Vernal Oilers); Won Game 2-1 (Hawkesbury Knights)
