= Wilkes-Barre/Scranton Knights (Tier III) =

- City: Pittston, Pennsylvania
- League: United States Premier Hockey League; Premier Division
- Founded: 2005
- Home arena: Revolution Ice Centre
- Colors: Navy and white
- Affiliate: Wilkes-Barre/Scranton Knights

Franchise history
- 2005–2010: Binghamton Jr. Senators
- 2010–2015 2017–2019 2021–present: Wilkes-Barre/Scranton Knights

Championships
- Regular season titles: 2022
- Division titles: 2022
- Playoff championships: 2013

The Wilkes-Barre/Scranton Knights are a Tier III junior ice hockey team from Pittston, Pennsylvania that currently plays in the United States Premier Hockey League's (USPHL) Premier Division. Junior teams are composed of players ages 16–20 who carry amateur status.

== History ==
=== AJHL/EHL years (2010–2015) ===
From 2005 to 2010, the Tier III franchise was operated by an organization in Binghamton, New York, as the Binghamton Jr. Senators at the Chenango Ice Rink in the Atlantic Junior Hockey League (AJHL). In 2010, the franchise was transferred to an organization to the Wilkes-Barre/Scranton Knights that had been operating as a youth organization formed in 2005. After relocating, the organization also began a team at the Junior B level in the Metropolitan Junior Hockey League as well as youth hockey select teams at the Midget U18, Midget 16U, Bantam, Peewee, and Squirt and Mite levels. Along with Revolution Ice Centre in Pittston, Pennsylvania, the Knights also practiced at Revolution Training Centre in Dunmore, Pennsylvania. The training center has two skating surfaces: one synthetic ice and the other is an 85 x 45 ice surface.

The Knights won the AJHL Championship during the 2012–13 season in the best of three series against the Northern Cyclones and earned the AJHL President's Cup. The Knights lost the first game of the series 0–2 but came back to win the final two games. During the last game, the Cyclones had a 2–1 lead, but Knights forward Matt Cessna tied the game at 2–2 with 22 seconds remaining in the third period. With four minutes remaining in the first overtime, Cessna also scored the game-winner and was named the Most Valuable Player of the playoff championship series. The Knights' 2012–13 AJHL championship team featured team captain Jack Ceglarski (grandson of Len Ceglarski) and defenceman Oscar Nyquist (brother of Gustav Nyquist).

In 2013, Tier III junior hockey leagues underwent a large reorganization and the AJHL re-branded as the Eastern Hockey League (EHL).

=== NAHL years (2015–2020) ===
On May 1, 2015, it was announced that the Knights had purchased the dormant Dawson Creek Rage franchise in the North American Hockey League and began play as a Tier II team in the 2015–16 NAHL season while also dropping their Tier III teams. The organization would re-add Tier III teams in the EHL in 2017. In 2019, the Tier III team left the EHL and joined the NAHL's Tier III league, the North American 3 Hockey League (NA3HL), but were removed from the league prior to playing a game.

=== USPHL (2021–present) ===
In February 2021, the Knights announced they would be reactivating their junior teams in the Premier and Elite Divisions of the United States Premier Hockey League, an independently sanctioned league, in the 2021–22 season. During their first season in the USPHL, they announced they would be adding a tuition-free National Collegiate Development Conference (NCDC) team, the USPHL's equivalent of a Tier II league, for the 2022–23 season.

== Season-by-season records ==
Season	GP	W	L	T	OTL	Pts	GF	GA	Finish	Playoffs
Atlantic Junior Hockey League
2010–11	44	6	38	–	0	12	98	286	6th of 6, South Div. 12th of 12, AJHL	Missing information
2011–12	44	16	21	2	5	39	115	141	9th of 12, AJHL	Missing information
2012–13	44	26	14	4	0	56	151	113	4th of 12, AJHL	Won Quarterfinal series, 2–0 (Boston Jr. Rangers); Won Semifinal series, 2–0 (Connecticut Wolfpack); Won Championship series, 2–1 (Northern Cyclones)
Eastern Hockey League
2013–14	44	19	16	8	1	47	121	111	4th of 6, Central Div. 8th of 17, EHL	Won First Round series, 2–0 (Philadelphia Jr. Flyers); Lost Quarterfinal series, 0–2 (Northern Cyclones)
2014–15	44	28	14	2	0	58	155	126	2nd of 5, Central Div. 6th of 19, EHL	Won First Round series, 2–1 (Boston Bandits); Lost Quarterfinal series, 0–2 (Northern Cyclones)
2015–16	did not play									
North American 3 Atlantic Hockey League
2016–17	36	32	4	—	0	64	289	100	2nd of 7, NA3AHL	Won Quarterfinal series, 2–0 (Exton Bulls); Won Semifinal series, 2–0 (Metro Fighting Moose); Lost Championship series, 0–2 (Long Island Royals)
Eastern Hockey League
2017–18	50	24	25	—	1	49	170	180	3rd of 4, Mid-Atlantic Div. 5th of 8, South Conf. 9th of 16, EHL	Lost First Round series, 1–2 (New York Apple Core)
2018–19	44	27	13	—	4	58	167	116	2nd of 3, North Div. 3rd of 8, Mid-Atlantic Conf. 6th of 18, EHL	Won First Round series, 2–0 (New York Apple Core); Won Quarterfinal series, 2–1 (New Jersey 87's); Lost Frozen Finals Round-Robin, 0–4 New Hampshire Avalanche, 2–7 (East Coast Wizards), 1–6 (Philadelphia Little Flyers)
2019–20	did not play									
2020–21	did not play									
USPHL Premier
2021–22	44	39	3	—	2	80	228	89	1st of 5, Atlantic West Div. 1st of 64, USPHL Premier	Won Div. Semifinal series, 2–0 (Buffalo Stampede); Won Div. Final series, 2–0 (Utica Jr. Comets); Won Pool A Round-Robin, 3–2 (Islanders Hockey Club), 3–0 (Florida Junior Blades), 3–1 (Metro Jets); Won Quarterfinal, 2–1 (Minnesota Blue Ox); Lost Semifinal, 1–8 (Metro Jets)
2022–23	44	35	7	—	2	72	217	92	2nd of 10, Mid-Atlantic Div. 8th of 70, USPHL Premier	Won Div. Quarterfinal series, 2–0 (Elmira Jr. Enforcers); Won Div. Semifinal series, 2–1 (Utica Jr. Comets); Won seeding round, 5–4 (Fort Wayne Spacemen), 2–3 (Hudson Havoc); Won Eighthfinal, 5–1 (Tampa Bay Juniors); Lost Quarterfinal, 1–2 (Northern Cyclones)
2023–24	44	30	7	—	7	67	209	110	2nd of 10, Atlantic t-10th of 61, USPHL Premier	Won Div. Quarterfinal series, 2–0 (Jersey Hitmen); Won Div. Semifinal series, 2–0 (Elmira Impact) seeding round, 0–1 (Metro Jets Development Program), 3–0 (Bold City Battalion); Lost Eighthfinal, 2–6 (Connecticut Jr. Rangers)
2024–25	44	17	21	—	6	40	129	154	8th of 11, Atlantic; 50th of 73, USPHL Premier	Won Div. Quarterfinal series, 2–0 (Connecticut Jr. Rangers); Won Div. Semifinal series, 2–0 (Mercer Chiefs); Lost Div. Final series, 0–2 (P.A.L. Jr. Islanders)
2025–26	44	25	16	2	1	53	205	146	5th of 10, Atlantic; 32nd of 77, USPHL Premier	Lost Div. Quarterfinal 0-2 (P.A.L. Jr. Islanders)

== Alumni ==
The Knights/Jr. Senators franchise has produced a number of alumni playing in higher levels of junior hockey, NCAA Division I, Division III, ACHA college and professional programs, including:

- Jerry D'Amigo - Toronto Maple Leafs 2009 NHL entry draft - Rensselaer Polytechnic Institute (ECAC Hockey)
- Gianni Paolo – Actor most known for portraying Brayden Weston on the hit crime drama Power, and Power Book II: Ghost; Also known for MA, The Fosters, The Mick and Chance (TV series)

== See also ==
- Wilkes-Barre/Scranton Penguins
