= Collège Universel Gatineau =

- City: Gatineau, Quebec
- League: United States Premier Hockey League; Premier Division
- Division: Canada
- Founded: 2023
- Home arena: L'Académie de Hockey Stéphane Gougeon
- Colors: Green, and lime
- General manager: Marco Pietroniro
- Head coach: Darren Rumble

Franchise history
- 2023–present: Collège Universel Gatineau

The Collège Universel Gatineau are a Tier III junior ice hockey team playing in the United States Premier Hockey League's (USPHL) Premier division. The Vees play their home games at the L'Académie de Hockey Stéphane Gougeon in Gatineau, Quebec.

== History ==
In May of 2018, the Collège Universel – Gatineau Campus announced the foundation of an ice hockey program, which would operate under the name 'Universel College Unik'. Five years later, on August 23, 2023, the USPHL announced that they had added reached an agreement with the college and would add a new Tier III junior team to the league's Premier Division. Universel was the first Canadian club in the USPHL which provided a bit of a logistical problem in their inaugural season. Due to long travel times between Gatineau and every other USPHL team, the club would play the entire season on the road. Despite this, the college managed to finish their first year with a winning record.

Before their first year was finished, the team received good news when the USPHL added five more Canadian clubs for the succeeding year. This allowed Gatineau to play games at its home rink beginning in 2024.

== Season-by-season records ==
Season	GP	W	L	OTL	Pts	GF	GA	Regular season finish	Playoffs
2023–24	44	22	20	2	46	145	134	3rd of 7, New England Div. 35th of 61, USPHL Premier	Won Div. Quarterfinal series, 2–0 (Springfield Pics); Lost Div. Semifinal series, 0–2 (Islanders Hockey Club)
2024–25	44	20	22	2	42	179	189	4th of 6, Canada Div. 49th of 73, USPHL Premier	Won Div. Quarterfinal series, 2–0 (Somang Hockey); Lost Div. Semifinal series, 0–2 (Montreal Black Vees)
2025–26	44	23	17	4	50	163	143	5th of 9, St. Lawrence. 38th of 77, USPHL Premier	Lost Div. Quarterfinal series, 0-2 (St-Lazare Avalanche)
