= Vernal Oilers =

- City: Vernal, Utah
- League: United States Premier Hockey League NCDC
- Conference: West
- Division: Mountain
- Founded: 2021
- Home arena: Western Park Ice Rink
- Colors: Blue, orange, white
- General manager: David Imonti
- Head coach: Ryan Howse

Franchise history
- 2021–present: Vernal Oilers

Championships
- Regular season titles: 2: 2025, 2026
- Division titles: 4: 2023, 2024, 2025, 2026
- Playoff championships: 2: 2025, 2026

The Vernal Oilers are a junior ice hockey team that is currently a member of the United States Premier Hockey League's (USPHL) Premier Division. The Oilers play their home games at the Western Park Ice Rink in Vernal, Utah.

== History ==
As part of the Western States Hockey League plan to return after the COVID-19 pandemic, the league added the Vernal Oilers as an expansion team for the 2021–22 season. However, the WSHL was never able to restart play. Instead, in January 2022, the Oilers were one of several former WSHL franchises to form the Can-Am Junior Hockey League.

After finishing out their abbreviated first season, the Oilers were invited to join the USPHL's Premier Division along with four other western teams and establish a new regional division. The Oilers accepted and swiftly became one of the top teams in the USPHL. In 2024–25, the Oilers compiled an astounding regular season record of 44–0, becoming one of the few ice hockey teams in history to not lose a single game. During their postseason run, the Oilers were just as dominant, winning all but one of their game en route to the championship. The only loss for the Oilers came in the national Round-Robin series after they had already secured a promotion to the championship round and thus did not affect their ability to win the title.

== Season-by-season records ==
Season	GP	W	L	OTL	Pts	GF	GA	Finish	Playoffs
Can-Am Junior Hockey League
2021–22	41	23	16	2	48	272	229	3rd of 6, CAJHL	Won Pool A Round-Robin, 5–6 (Cold Lake Aeros), 6–2 (Barrhead Bombers); Won Semifinal, 5–4 (SO) (Hinton Timberwolves); Lost Championship, 1–6 (Cold Lake Aeros)
USPHL Premier
2022–23	44	35	5	5	73	284	132	1st of 5, Northwest Div. t-8th of 70, USPHL Premier	Won Div. Semifinal series, 2–0 (Rogue Valley Royals); Won Div. Final series, 2–1 (Seattle Totems); Lost seeding round, 1–4 (New York Aviators), 1–3 (Toledo Cherokee); Won Consolation game, 6–4 (Minnesota Moose)
2024–25	44	44	0	0	88	406	69	1st of 7, Northwest Div. 1st of 73, USPHL Premier	Won Div. Semifinal series, 2–0 (Iron County Yeti); Won Div. Final series, 2–0 (Seattle Totems); Won Division 2 Round-Robin, 4–0 (Fort Wayne Spacemen), 7–3 (Universel Sherbrooke), 3–4 (Potomac Patriots); Won Semifinal, 7–3 (Tampa Bay Juniors); Won Championship, 6–2 (Springfield Pics); USPHL Premier League - NATIONALCHAMPIONS
2025–26	44	42	2	0	88	373	82	1st of 7, Northwest Div. 1st of 77, USPHL Premier	Won Div. Semifinal series, 2–0 (McCall Smokejumpers); Won Div. Final series, 2–0 (Seattle Totems); Won 2nd Pool 1 Round-Robin, 3–0 ( Hawkesbury Knights ), 5–3 ( West Chester Wolves), 5-1 ( Minnesota Squatch 6-3); Won Semifinal, 6-0 ( Hampton Roads Whalers); Won Championship, 6–4 ( Fresno Monsters ) USPHL Premier League - NATIONALCHAMPIONS
