= Montreal Black Vees =

- City: Montreal, Quebec
- League: United States Premier Hockey League; Premier Division
- Division: Canada
- Founded: 2024
- Home arena: Centre sportif et culturel St-Jean-Vianney
- Colors: Black, and blue
- Affiliates: Montana Buckaroos

Franchise history
- 2024–present: Montreal Black Vees

Championships
- Division titles: 2025

The Montreal Black Vees are a Tier III junior ice hockey team playing in the United States Premier Hockey League's (USPHL) Premier division. The Vees play their home games at the Centre sportif et culturel St-Jean-Vianney in Montreal, Quebec.

== History ==
In February of 2024, the USPHL announced the addition of five new Canadian-based franchises, including the Montreal Vees. The rapid expansion north allowed the league to form a new division made up entirely of teams from north of the border, which would begin play the following season. Montreal did well in its first season, winning the inaugural division title but ultimately fell in the division postseason final. After their first season, Montreal reached an affiliation deal with the Montana Buckaroos, an incoming NCDC club.

== Season-by-season records ==
Season	GP	W	L	OTL	Pts	GF	GA	Regular season finish	Playoffs
2024–25	44	27	15	2	56	193	153	1st of 6, Canada Div. 26th of 73, USPHL Premier	Won Div. Semifinal series, 2–0 (Universel Collège Gatineau); Lost Div. Final series, 1–2 (Universel Sherbrooke)
2025–26	43	28	12	3	59	178	125	2nd of 9, St. Lawrence; 25th of 77, USPHL Premier	Won Div. Quarters, 2-0 (NY Dynamos); Lost Div. Semis, 1–2 (Saint-Lazare Avalanche)
