= Kingston Wranglers =

- City: Kingston, Ontario
- League: United States Premier Hockey League Premier
- Division: Canada
- Founded: 2024
- Home arena: INVISTA Centre
- Colors: Blue, gold and white
- Head coach: Mark Major

Franchise history
- 2024–present: Kingston Wranglers

The Kingston Wranglers are a Tier III junior ice hockey team that is currently a member of the United States Premier Hockey League's (USPHL) Premier Division. The Wranglers play their home games at the INVISTA Centre in Kingston, Ontario.

== History ==
On February 12, 2024, the USPHL announced the addition of five Canadian teams as expansion teams. The Kingston Wranglers were one of the new clubs that joined with an existing team to form the leagues new Canada Division for the 2024–25 season.

== Season-by-season records ==
Season	GP	W	L	OTL	Pts	GF	GA	Finish	Playoffs
2024–25	44	4	40	0	8	55	310	6th of 6, Canada Div. 72nd of 73, USPHL Premier	Lost Div. Quarterfinal series, 0–2 (Universel Sherbrooke)
2025–26	43	7	33	3	17	73	210	8th of 9, St. Lawrence ??nd of 77, USPHL Premier	Lost Div. Quarterfinal series, 0–2 (Hawkesbury Knights)
