= Iron County Yeti =

- City: Enoch, Utah
- League: United States Premier Hockey League Premier
- Division: Northwest
- Founded: 2023
- Home arena: KJ's Ice Barn
- Colors: Navy, blue and white
- Head coach: Todd Renae

Franchise history
- 2023–2024: Casper Roughnecks
- 2024–present: Iron County Yeti

The Iron County Yeti are a junior ice hockey team that is currently a member of the United States Premier Hockey League's (USPHL) Premier Division. The Yeti play their home games at the KJ's Ice Barn in Enoch, Utah.

== History ==
Casper Roughnecks logo

On May 10, 2023, the Casper Roughnecks were approved as an expansion franchise to the USPHL for the 2023–24 season. After just one season, the team relocated and became the Iron County Yeti.

== Season-by-season records ==
Season	GP	W	L	OTL	SOL	Pts	GF	GA	Finish	Playoffs
Casper Roughnecks
2023–24	44	19	22	3	-	41	171	197	3rd of 5, Northwest Div. t-38th of 61, USPHL Premier	Lost Div. Semifinal series, 0–2 (Seattle Totems)
Iron County Yeti
2024–25	44	13	30	1	-	27	141	326	4th of 7, Northwest Div. 58th of 73, USPHL Premier	Lost Div. Semifinal series, 0–2 (Vernal Oilers)
2025–26	44	17	26	0	1	35	170	250	5th of 7, Northwest Div. 51st of 77, USPHL Premier	Did not qualify
