= Boston Junior Rangers (Tier III) =

- City: Tewksbury, Massachusetts
- League: United States Premier Hockey League (USPHL); Premier Division
- Division: New England
- Founded: 2015
- Home arena: Breakaway Ice Center
- Colors: Blue, white and red
- Owner: Mike Sorabella
- General manager: Rich DeCaprio
- Head coach: Dan Ferri
- Affiliates: Boston Junior Rangers

Franchise history
- 2015–Present: Boston Junior Rangers

Championships
- Regular season titles: 5: 2018, 2019, 2020, 2021, 2023
- Division titles: 2: 2021, 2023
- Conference titles: 3: 2018, 2019, 2020
- Playoff championships: 3: 2016, 2018, 2022

The Boston Junior Rangers (aka Boston Jr. Rangers) are a Tier III junior ice hockey team playing in the United States Premier Hockey League's (USPHL) Premier division. The Jr. Rangers play their home games at Breakaway Ice Center in Tewksbury, Massachusetts.

== History ==
In 2015, the Eastern Hockey League founded a second tier (restricted to players 19 years and younger) and renamed their levels of play as Premier (1st) and Elite (2nd). The Boston Junior Rangers, who were already members of the league, formed a second tier club that began operating that season. The league renamed the tiers in 2017 with the top level simply being called 'EHL' and the second tier 'EHL Premier'. Other than the naming, no changes were made to the league's structure.

The Junior Rangers saw immediate success, winning the inaugural Elite Division championship as then again two years later. The team remained a strong force in the league, winning five division titles over a span of six seasons and captured their third title in 2022.

In 2024, the Boston Junior Rangers and Worcester Jr. Railers agreed to a partnership and arrangement. The two clubs would leave the EHL and join the United States Premier Hockey League. As both organizations had teams in the EHL's two divisions, their former EHL franchises would join the National Collegiate Development Conference (Tier II) while the EHL Premier teams would become members of USPHL Premier (Tier III). Additionally, the two would jointly operate a further club in USPHL's Elite Division with potential future teams being added by joint decision.

== Season-by-season records ==
Season	GP	W	L	OTL	Pts	GF	GA	Regular season finish	Playoffs
EHL Elite
2015–16	42	32	7	3	67	216	105	2nd of 8, EHL Elite	Won Pool B Round Robin, 9–3 (Valley Jr. Warriors), 7–2 (Walpole Express), 7–2 (New England Wolves); Won Championship series, 2–0 (Boston Bandits)
2016–17	42	22	15	5	52	180	160	6th of 8, North Conf. 8th of 16, EHL Elite	Won Conf. First Round, 3–2 (SO) (Boston Bandits); Won North Pool Round Robin, 3–4 (Vermont Lumberjacks), 8–2 (New England Wolves), 4–3 (New Hampshire Junior Monarchs); Lost Championship series, 0–2 (Philadelphia Revolution)
EHL Premier
2017–18	44	37	4	3	77	216	80	1st of 5, North Conf. 1st of 13, EHL Premier	Won Conf. Semifinal, 7–2 (New England Wolves); Won Conf. Final series, 2–1 (Vermont Lumberjacks); Won Championship, 4–3 (Philadelphia Jr. Flyers)
2018–19	42	34	4	4	72	244	91	1st of 6, North Conf. 1st of 12, EHL Premier	Won Conf. Semifinal series, 2–0 (Vermont Lumberjacks); Lost Conf. Final series, 0–2 (New England Wolves)
2019–20	42	34	4	6	70	260	104	1st of 8, New England Conf. 1st of 13, EHL Premier	Postseason cancelled
2020–21	36	29	3	4	62	163	70	1st of 5, Central Div. 1st of 12, EHL Premier	Won Div. Semifinal series, 2–0 (Valley Jr. Warriors); Lost Div. Final series, 1–2 (Worcester Jr. Railers)
2021–22	42	31	11	0	62	157	99	2nd of 4, Central Div. 3rd of 13, EHL Premier	Won Div. Semifinal series, 2–0 (Seahawks Hockey Club); Won Div. Final series, 2–0 (Worcester Jr. Railers); Won Round Robin Semifinal, 5–3 (New Hampshire Avalanche), 3–1 (Vermont Lumberjacks), 3–3 (Philadelphia Little Flyers); Won Championship, 4–3 (OT) (New Hampshire Avalanche)
2022–23	42	34	7	1	69	189	103	1st of 5, Central Div. 1st of 15, EHL Premier	Won Div. Semifinal series, 2–1 (Express Hockey Club); Won Div. Final series, 2–0 (Worcester Jr. Railers); Lost Round Robin Semifinal, 1–1 (New Jersey 87's), 0–2 (New Hampshire Avalanche), 1–4 (Worcester Jr. Railers)
2023–24	42	31	8	3	65	184	116	2nd of 6, Boston Div. 2nd of 16, EHL Premier	Won Div. Semifinal series, 2–1 (Express Hockey Club); Lost Div. Final series, 1–2 (Worcester Jr. Railers); Won Round Robin Semifinal, 3–1 (New Jersey 87's), 5–3 (New England Wolves), cancelled (Worcester Jr. Railers) ost Championship, 2–9 (Worcester Jr. Railers)
USPHL Premier
2024–25	44	12	25	7	31	130	170	8th of 9, New England Div. t-55th of 73, USPHL Premier	Lost Div. Quarterfinal series, 0–2 (Islanders Hockey Club)
