= Bold City Battalion =

Florida Surge
- City: Jacksonville, Florida
- League: United States Premier Hockey League Premier
- Division: Florida
- Founded: 2023
- Home arena: Community First Igloo
- Colors: Blue and gold
- Owners: Ron Kinnear and Scott Solomon
- Head coach: Steven Oleksy

Franchise history
- 2023–2025: Bold City Battalion
- 2025–present: Florida Surge

Championships
- Division titles: 2024

The Florida Surge are a Tier III junior ice hockey team playing in the United States Premier Hockey League's (USPHL) NCDN and Premier Divisions. The Surge play their home games at Community First Igloo.

== History ==
The Bold City Battalion were a Tier III junior ice hockey team playing in the United States Premier Hockey League's (USPHL) Premier Division. The Battalion play their home games at Community First Igloo.

In February of 2023, the USPHL announced the addition of the Bold City Battalion as an expansion franchise to the Premier Division.. After 6 games into the 2025-26 season the Bold folded due to financial and operational challenges.

March 29, 2026, The Junior Hockey News, posted an article saying that junior hockey was returning to Jacksonville. The USPHL had approved the Florida Surge as an expansion franchise with teams in both the NCDC and Premier leagues.

== Season-by-season records ==
Season	GP	W	L	OTL	Pts	GF	GA	Regular season finish	Playoffs
2023–24	44	30	11	3	63	195	112	1st of 6, Florida Div. t-16th of 61, USPHL Premier	Won Div. Semifinal series, 2–1 (Atlanta Mad Hatters); Seeding games, 2–3 (Nashville Spartans), 0–3 (Wilkes-Barre/Scranton Knights); Lost Eighthfinal, 0–4 (Charlotte Rush)
2024–25	44	24	12	6	54	160	136	2nd of 6, Florida Div. t-28th of 73, USPHL Premier	Lost Div. First Round, 2–4 (Florida Eels); Won Div. Loser Semifinal, 7–1 (Florida Jr. Blades); Won Div. Loser Final, 2–1 (Florida Eels); Lost Div. Final, 2–3 (Tampa Bay Juniors)
2025–26	6	0	6	0	0	9	58	Folded	
Florida Surge
