= Somang Hockey =

- City: Terrebonne, Quebec
- League: United States Premier Hockey League Premier
- Division: St. Lawrence
- Founded: 2024
- Home arena: Aréna de Lachenaie
- Colors: Black, red and white
- Head coach: Andre Marais

Franchise history
- 2024–present: Somang Hockey

The Somang Hockey (aka Somang Laurentides Lanaudiere HC) are a Tier III junior ice hockey team that is currently a member of the United States Premier Hockey League's (USPHL) Premier Division. Somang plays their home games at the Aréna de Lachenaie in Terrebonne, Quebec.

== History ==
On February 12, 2024, the USPHL announced the addition of five Canadian teams as expansion teams. Somang Hockey was one of the new clubs that joined with an existing team to form the leagues new Canada Division for the 2024–25 season.

== Season-by-season records ==
Season	GP	W	L	OTL	Pts	GF	GA	Finish	Playoffs
2024–25	44	18	23	3	39	173	198	5th of 6, Canada Div. 51st of 73, USPHL Premier	Lost Div. Quarterfinal series, 0–2 (Universel Collège Gatineau)
2025–26	44	26	13	5	57	162	118	3rd of 9, St. Lawrence ??st of 77, USPHL Premier	Lost Div. Quarterfinal series, 0–2 (Universel Sherbrooke)
