= Hawkesbury Knights =

Hudson Knights
- City: Hudson, Quebec
- League: United States Premier Hockey League Premier
- Division: St. Lawrence
- Founded: 2024
- Home arena: St. Lazare
- Colors: Black, blue and silver
- General manager: Shawn Anderson
- Head coach: Shawn Anderson

Franchise history
- 2024–2026: Hawkesbury Knights
- 2026–present: Hudson Knights

Championships
- Regular season titles: 2026
- Division titles: 2026

The Hudson Knights are a Tier III junior ice hockey team that is currently a member of the United States Premier Hockey League's (USPHL) Premier Division. The Knights play their home games at the St Lazare Arena in Saint-Lazare, Quebec.

== History ==
On February 12, 2024, the USPHL announced the addition of five Canadian teams, including the Hawkesbury Knights, as an expansion franchises for the upcoming season.

Following the 2025-26 season, announced that they would be re-locating to Hudson, Quebec. They are retaining their brand as the Knights.

== Season-by-season records ==
Season	GP	W	L	OTL	Pts	GF	GA	Finish	Playoffs
2024–25	44	25	15	4	54	197	127	2nd of 6, Canada Div. t-28th of 73, USPHL Premier	Lost Div. Semifinal series, 0–2 (Universel Sherbrooke)
2025–26	44	34	10	0	68	155	102	1st of 9, St. Lawrence; 14th of 77, USPHL Premier	Won Div. Quarterfinal series, 2-0 (Kingston Wranglers); Won Div. Semifinal series, 2-1 (Universel Sherbrooke); Won Div Finals 2-0 (St-Lazare Avalanche); Advance to Fraser Cup Playoffs

== USPHL Premier Championships ==
Round robin play in pool with the top team from each pool and one wild card advancing to semifinal.

Year	Round Robin	Record	Standing	Semifinal	Championship Game
2026 Playoffs	L, Vernal Oilers (Northwest Conf) 3-5; L, Minnesota Squatch (North Conf) 3-4; L, West Chester Wolves (Atlantic Conf) 1-2	0-3-0	Pool 1 eliminated	-	—
