= Bremerton Sockeyes =

- City: Bremerton, Washington
- League: United States Premier Hockey League Premier
- Division: Northwest
- Founded: 2024
- Home arena: Bremerton Ice Center
- Colors: Black, cream and salmon
- General manager: Chad Olson
- Head coach: Chad Olson

Franchise history
- 2024–present: Bremerton Sockeyes

The Bremerton Sockeyes are a junior ice hockey team that is currently a member of the United States Premier Hockey League's (USPHL) Premier Division. The Sockeyes play their home games at the Bremerton Ice Center in Bremerton, Washington.

== History ==
In April 22, 2024, the Bremerton Sockeyes were one of several expansion teams announced by the USPHL for the 2024–25 season.

== Season-by-season records ==
Season	GP	W	L	OTL	SOL	Pts	GF	GA	Finish	Playoffs
2024–25	44	7	34	3	0	17	82	264	6th of 7, Northwest Div. t-65th of 73, USPHL Premier	Did not qualify
2025–26	44	22	22	0	0	44	196	174	4th of 7, Northwest Div. 41st of 77, USPHL Premier	Lost Div Semifinal 0-2 (Seattle Totems)
