= Colorado Fighting Elk =

- City: Craig, Colorado
- League: United States Premier Hockey League Premier
- Division: Northwest
- Founded: 2024
- Home arena: Moffat County Ice Arena
- Colors: Green and black
- General manager: Chad Olson
- Head coach: Chad Olson

Franchise history
- 2024–present: Colorado Fighting Elk

The Colorado Fighting Elk are a junior ice hockey team that is currently a member of the United States Premier Hockey League's (USPHL) Premier Division. The Fighting Elk play their home games at the Moffat County Ice Arena in Craig, Colorado. They finished the 2025-26 season 0-44, with a goal differential of -387.

== History ==
Colorado's logo for its inaugural season

In April 22, 2024, the Colorado Fighting Elk were one of several expansion teams announced by the USPHL for the 2024–25 season.

== Season-by-season records ==
Season	GP	W	L	OTL	Pts	GF	GA	Finish	Playoffs
2024–25	44	6	37	1	13	82	264	7th of 7, Northwest Div. t-67th of 73, USPHL Premier	Did not qualify
2025–26	44	0	43	1	1	59	446	7th of 7, Northwest Div. 77th of 77, USPHL Premier	Did not qualify
