= Elmira Impact =

- City: Elmira, New York
- League: United States Premier Hockey League Premier
- Division: Atlantic/Mid-Atlantic
- Founded: 2020
- Home arena: Murray Athletic Center (2023-2026), First Arena (2020-2023, occasional home games, (2023-24))
- Colors: Black and neon green
- Head coach: Glen Patterson

Franchise history
- 2020–2023: Elmira Jr. Enforcers
- 2023–2026: Elmira Impact

The Elmira Impact were a Tier III junior ice hockey team playing in the United States Premier Hockey League's (USPHL) Premier Division. The Impact played their home games at Murray Athletic Center. The Elmira Impact ceased operations January 17th, 2026.

== History ==
Elmira Jr. Enforcers logo

The USPHL added the Elmira Jr. Enforcers as an expansion team to the Premier Division in 2020. After a good start, the franchise foundered for the next two years before rebranding as the 'Elmira Impact. Beginning in 2022, the organization also fielded a second team of the same name in the USPHL's Elite Division.

The team enjoyed considerable success over the following two seasons before ceasing operations midway through the 2025–26 season.

== Season-by-season records ==
Season	GP	W	L	OTL	SOL	Pts	GF	GA	Regular season finish	Playoffs
Elmira Jr. Enforcers
2020–21	44	28	14	2	–	58	169	132	t-2nd of 10, Mid Atlantic Div. t-18th of 62, USPHL Premier	Won Div. Quarterfinal series, 2–0 (Buffalo Thunder); Won Div. Semifinal series, 2–0 (Philadelphia Hockey Club); Lost Group A Round-Robin, 4–2 (Metro Jets), 3–9 (Charleston Colonials), 0–1 (Northern Cyclones)
2021–22	44	8	33	3	–	19	113	229	5th of 5, Atlantic West Div. t-59th of 64, USPHL Premier	Did not qualify
2022–23	44	11	27	5	1	28	141	227	7th of 10, Mid Atlantic Div. 64th of 70, USPHL Premier	Lost Div. Quarterfinal series, 0–2 (Wilkes-Barre/Scranton Knights)
Elmira Impact
2023–24	44	23	14	5	2	53	183	144	t-4th of 8, Atlantic Div. t-27th of 61, USPHL Premier	Won Div. Quarterfinal series, 2–0 (P.A.L. Jr. Islanders); Lost Div. Semifinal series, 0–2 (Wilkes-Barre/Scranton Knights)
2024–25	44	29	11	4	0	62	197	132	2nd of 11, Atlantic Div. t-18th of 73, USPHL Premier	Lost Div. Quarterfinal series, 1–2 (P.A.L. Jr. Islanders)
2025–26	26	14	9	1	2	31	90	97	Folded	
