= Red River Spartans =

- City: Clarksville, Tennessee
- League: United States Premier Hockey League; Premier Division
- Division: Great Lakes
- Founded: 2024
- Home arena: F&M Bank Arena
- Colors: Black, red and gray
- Owner: Jonathan Tuggle
- Head coach: Ľuboš Bartečko

Franchise history
- 2022–2024: Nashville Spartans
- 2024–present: Red River Spartans

The Red River Spartans are a Tier III junior ice hockey team playing in the United States Premier Hockey League's (USPHL) Premier division. The Spartans play their home games at the F&M Bank Arena in Clarksville, Tennessee.

== History ==
In April of 2022, the USPHL announced the addition of the Nashville Spartans as an expansion franchise. Two years later, the club relocated to Clarksville and became the Red River Spartans.

== Season-by-season records ==
Season	GP	W	L	OTL	Pts	GF	GA	Regular season finish	Playoffs
2022–23	44	25	17	2	52	177	153	5th of 6, Southeast Div. t-30th of 70, USPHL Premier	Did not qualify
2023–24	44	36	7	1	73	318	83	2nd of 6, Great Lakes Div. 7th of 61, USPHL Premier	Won Div. Semifinal series, 2–0 (Toledo Cherokee); Seeding round, 3–2 (Bold City Battalion), 7–5 (Wisconsin Rapids RiverKings); Lost Eighthfinal, 5–8 (Islanders Hockey Club)
2024–25	44	22	21	1	45	167	203	4th of 7, Great Lakes Div. t-45th of 73, USPHL Premier	Lost Div. Quarterfinal series, 0–2 (Cincinnati Jr. Cyclones)
2025-26	44	35	9	0	70	218	116	3rd of 9, Great Lakes Div. 13th of 77, USPHL Premier	Won Div. Play In 2-0 (Fresh Coast Freeze); Lost Div Semifinals 0-2 (Metro Jets)
