= Universel Sherbrooke =

- City: Sherbrooke, Quebec
- League: United States Premier Hockey League Premier
- Division: St. Lawrence
- Founded: 2024
- Home arena: Thibeault Sport Complex
- Colors: Black and green
- General manager: Marco Pietroniro
- Head coach: Alexandre Gagnon

Franchise history
- 2024–present: Universel Sherbrooke

Universel Sherbrooke (aka Universel Collège Sherbrooke) is a Tier III junior ice hockey team that is currently a member of the United States Premier Hockey League's (USPHL) Premier Division. The Collège play their home games at both the Aréna Jane et Eric Molson in Lennoxville, Quebec and the Thibeault Sport Complex in Sherbrooke, Quebec.

== History ==
On February 12, 2024, the USPHL announced the addition of five Canadian teams, including the Universel Sherbrooke, as an expansion franchises for the upcoming season. Sherbrooke was added as a member of the Canada division. Before the start of their second season, due to expansion and some minor realignment, Sherbrooke was named to the newly formed St Lawrence division.

For the 2025–26 season, Universel Sherbrooke is adding a team to the National Collegiate Development Conference of the USPHL, a step higher than their initial team. The NCDC team will use The Rinks At Vermont at Jay Peak Resort in Jay, Vermont as their home arena and compete in the East Division of the New England Conference.

== Season-by-season PREMIER LEAGUE ==
Season	GP	W	L	OTL	Pts	GF	GA	Finish	Playoffs
2024–25	44	22	17	5	49	173	149	3rd of 6, Canada Div. t-36th of 73, USPHL Premier	Won Div. Quarterfinal series, 2–0 (Kingston Wranglers); Won Div. Semifinal series, 2–0 (Hawkesbury Knights); Won Div. Final series, 2–1 (Montreal Black Vees); Lost Division 2 Round Robin; 3–7 (Vernal Oilers), 1–5 (Potomac Patriots), 0–9 (Fort Wayne Spacemen)
2025–26	44	18	23	3	39	121	150	6 of 9, St. Lawrence; 47th of 77, USPHL Premier	Won Div. Quarter 2-0 (Somang Hockey); Lost Div Semi 1-2 (Hawkesbury Knights)

== Season-by-season NCDC LEAGUE ==
Season	GP	W	L	OTL	SOL	Pts	GF	GA	Finish	Playoffs
2025–26	53	15	31	5	2	37	176	229	6 of 6, NE East Div. 17 of 19, New England Conf; 30th of 33, NCDC	Did Not Qualify
