= EJHL South =

- Sport: Ice Hockey
- Founded: 2006
- Folded: 2013
- CEO: Rick Ninko
- No. of teams: 8
- Country: United States
- Last champion: Atlanta Junior Knights (5)
- Website: EJHL South

The EJHL South (formerly Southeast Junior Hockey League) was an American Tier III Junior ice hockey league sanctioned by USA Hockey. The league had eight teams located in Florida, North Carolina, Virginia and Georgia. With the elimination by USA Hockey of the Junior A, B and C labels, at the start of the 2011–12 season, the SEJHL was to become the Southern Atlantic Hockey League. This progression was approved by USA Hockey as the SAHL was preparing to compete at the top level of Tier III Junior hockey. However, unprecedented developments allowed the SAHL to be included in a partnership with the Eastern Junior Hockey League and to operate under the infrastructure and guidance of the EJHL as an affiliate member organization. The EJHL agreed to govern the league for a minimum of three seasons and the league would be called the "EJHL South" as an affiliate operation of the EJHL.

== History ==
The SEJHL began play in 2006 as USA Hockey-sanctioned Tier III Junior C league. On January 18, 2010 the SEJHL, in conjunction with USA Hockey, announced that beginning with the 2010–11 season the SEJHL would be a Jr. B league. With the elimination of Junior A, B and C by USA Hockey prior to the 2011–12 season, the league began to operate as the EJHL South under an affiliation with the Eastern Junior Hockey League until its dissolution at the end of the 2012–13 season. The EJHL folded after many of its teams left to form the United States Premier Hockey League (USPHL) leading to the EJHL south to reorganize and take the name Eastern Elite Hockey League. However, prior to the EEHL's first season the league merged with the new USPHL to form the Elite Division.

== Teams ==
Team	City	Arena
Atlanta Junior Knights	Marietta, GA	Marietta Ice Center
East Coast Eagles	Wake Forest, NC	Factory Ice Arena
Florida Eels	Fort Myers, FL	Fort Myers Skatium
Hampton Roads Whalers	Chesapeake, VA	Chilled Ponds Ice Sports Complex
Palm Beach Hawks	Lake Worth, FL	Palm Beach SkateZone
Potomac Patriots	Woodbridge, VA	Prince William Ice Center
Space Coast Hurricanes	Rockledge, FL	SpaceCoast IcePlex
Tampa Bay Juniors	Ellenton, FL	Ellenton Ice and Sports Complex

== Past Champions ==
- 2006–07: Space Coast Hurricanes
- 2007–08: Atlanta Junior Knights
- 2008–09: Atlanta Junior Knights
- 2009–10: Atlanta Junior Knights
- 2010–11: Atlanta Junior Knights
- 2011–12: Hampton Roads Whalers
- 2012–13: Atlanta Junior Knights

== National Champions from the SEJHL ==
- 2006–07 Jr. C: Space Coast Hurricanes
- 2008–09 Jr. C: Atlanta Junior Knights - National Runner-up
- 2009–10 Jr. C: Atlanta Junior Knights
