= Mercer Chiefs (Tier III) =

- City: Hamilton, New Jersey
- League: United States Premier Hockey League; Premier Division
- Conference: Atlantic
- Division: Atlantic
- Founded: 2024
- Home arena: Ice Land Skating Center
- Colors: Red, black, and white
- Owner: Black Bear Sports Group
- General manager: Rob Broderick
- Head coach: Frankie Gerbasi
- Affiliates: Mercer Chiefs

Franchise history
- 2024–present: Mercer Chiefs

The Mercer Chiefs are a Tier III junior ice hockey team playing in the United States Premier Hockey League's (USPHL) Premier division. The Chiefs play their home games at Ice Land Skating Center in Hamilton, New Jersey.

== History ==
In 2022, the USPHL admitted the Mercer Chiefs as an expansion franchise for the top division of league play. At the time, the Mercer Chiefs were an established youth hockey organization but had yet to field a full junior program (under-20) The Chiefs transferred their under-18 outfit from the Atlantic Youth Hockey League to the NCDC and also founded a second team that would play in the USPHL's Premier division in 2024.

== Season-by-season records ==
Season	GP	W	L	OTL	Pts	GF	GA	Regular season finish	Playoffs
2024–25	44	23	16	5	51	163	150	5th of 11, Atlantic Div. 33rd of 73, USPHL Premier	Won Div. Quarterfinal series, 2–1 (Red Bank Generals); Lost Div. Semifinal series, 3–2 (Wilkes-Barre/Scranton Knights)
2025–26	43	24	17	2	50	192	151	6th of 10, Atlantic Div. 37rd of 77, USPHL Premier	Lost Div. Quarterfinal series, 0-2 (Connecticut Jr. Rangers)
