= Olympia Ice Center =

Hockey rink in West Springfield, Massachusetts, U.S.

Coordinates: 42°8′18″N 72°37′12″W

Olympia Ice Arena
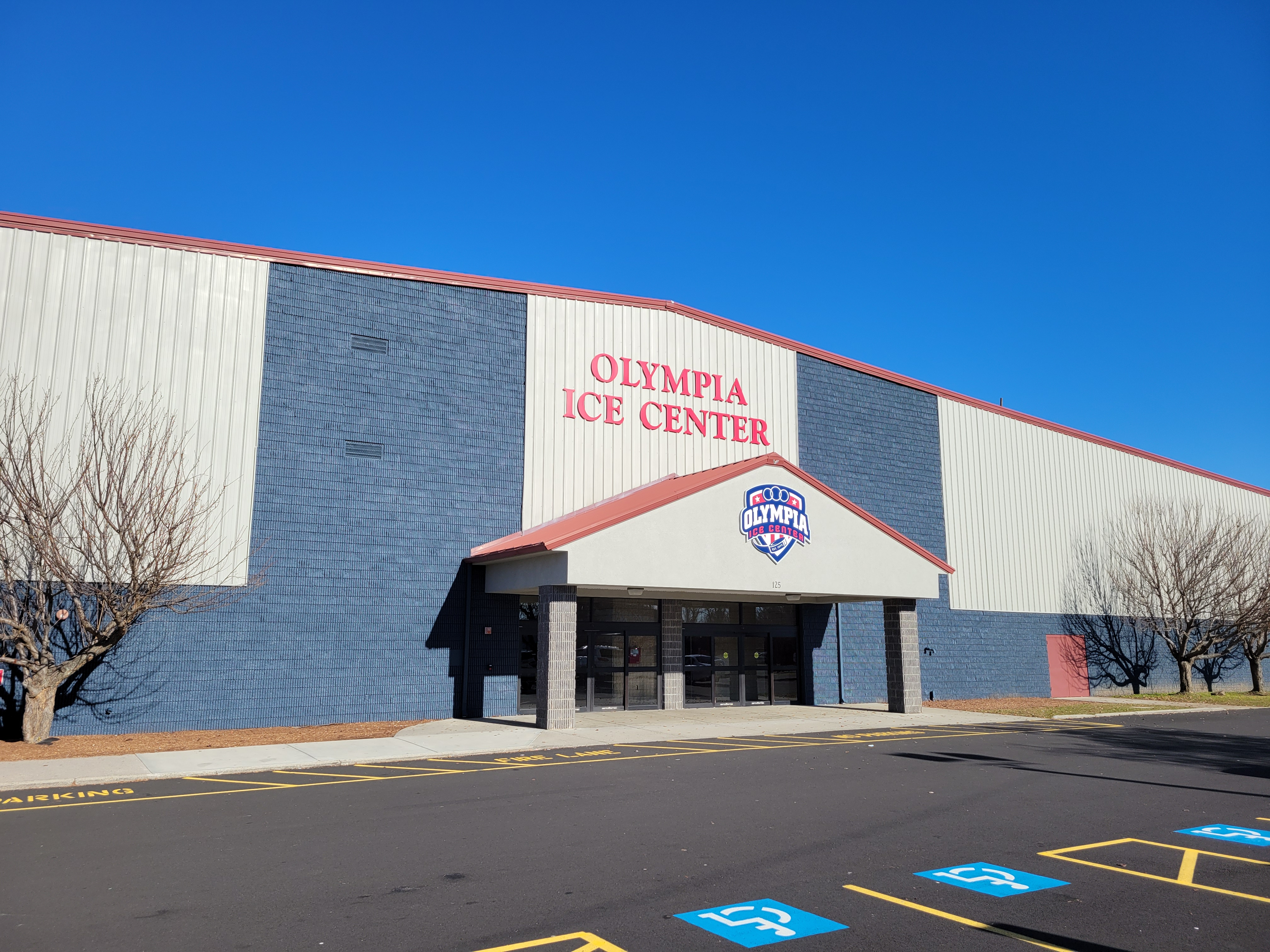
- Interactive map of Olympia Ice Arena
- Location: 125 Capital Dr, West Springfield, Massachusetts
- Capacity: 2,200
- Surface: 200x85 feet (hockey)

Tenants
- Western New England University; AIC men's ice hockey (1998–2016); Springfield Pics (USPHL)

Olympia Ice Center is a 2,200-seat hockey rink in West Springfield, Massachusetts. It is currently home to the Western New England University men's and woman's ice hockey teams. The teams compete in the Commonwealth Coast Conference of the NCAA III. It was home to the American International College Yellow Jackets men's ice hockey team from 1998 to 2016. The team began playing at the venue when they moved to Division I for ice hockey in 1998. It is located approximately six miles from the AIC campus. The building has two other ice surfaces for use as practice facilities or for local teams and also serves as an alternative site for Springfield College once to three times per season.
