= Toledo Cherokee =

- City: Toledo, Ohio
- League: USPHL Premier
- Conference: Great Lakes
- Founded: 1993
- Home arena: Team Toledo Ice House
- Colors: Red, white, and black
- Owner: Toledo Cherokee Board Of Directors (Team President Don Manders)
- General manager: Kenny Miller
- Head coach: Kenny Miller

Franchise history
- 1993–present: Toledo Cherokee

Championships
- Regular season titles: 1994–95, 1995–96, 1997–98, 1998–99
- National titles: 1997–98
- Hurster Cup: 1995, 1996, 1997, 1998, 1999

The Toledo Cherokee are a junior ice hockey team in the United States Premier Hockey League (USPHL) as part of the Premier Division. The team plays their home games at the Team Toledo Ice House in Toledo, Ohio. The team is coached by Kenny Miller since 2012.

== History ==
Before moving to Tier III Junior A hockey, the Cherokee competed in Junior B hockey, the team won the Junior B National Championship in 1998. The team was founded in the Central States Hockey League (CSHL) in 1993. In 2010, the CSHL became the North American 3 Hockey League (NA3HL). The Cherokee left the NA3HL in 2018 for the Premier Division of the United States Premier Hockey League, a non-sanctioned league.

== Season-by-season records ==
Season	GP	W	L	OTL	SOL	Pts	GF	GA	Finish	Playoffs
USPHL (Premier Div)
2018–19	44	13	28	2	1	29	111	170	6th of 6, Great Lake; 41st of 50, Premier	did not qualify
2019–20	44	31	12	0	1	63	210	141	3rd of 6, Great Lake; 12th of 52, Premier	Playoffs cancelled
2020–21	44	39	3	2	0	80	253	76	2nd of 7, Great Lake; 6th of 64, Premier	Won Div. Semifinals, 2-0 vs. Pittsburgh Vengeance; Advance to Pool 'D' Play (W 3-1 Islanders HC)(W 7-2 Fresno Monsters) (L 2-5 Carolina Hurricanes); 2-1 - 2nd of 4 -eliminated
2021–22	44	35	6	3	0	73	253	76	2nd of 7, Great Lake Div. 6th of 64, Premier	Won Div. Semifinals, 2-0 vs. Columbus Mavericks; Advance to Pool 'D' Play (W 2-1 Richmond Generals)(SOW 5-4 Fresno Monsters) (W 2-1 Minnesota Blue Ox); 3-0 - 1st of 4 Lost League Quarterfinal Gm - 1-3 Metro Jets
2022–23	44	38	6	0	0	76	250	91	1st of 5 Great Lake Div. 4th of 70, Premier	Won Div. Semifinals, 2-0 vs. Cincinnati Cyclones; Advance to Seeding Play (W 3-1 Islanders HC)(W 3-1 Vernal Oilers); Won League 1/8 finals Gm - 2-1 Islanders HC; Lost League Quarterfinal Gm - 0-2 Charlote Rush
2023–24	44	31	11	2	0	64	248	106	3rd of 6, Great Lake Div. 14th of 52, Premier	Won Div. Quarterfinals, 2-0 vs. Cincinnati Cyclones; Lost Div. Semifinals, 0-2 vs. Nashville Spartans
2024–25	44	35	8	0	1	71	238	71	2nd of 7, Great Lake Div. 8th of 73, Premier	Won Div. Semifinals, 2-0 vs. Columbus Mavericks; Lost Div. Finals, 1-2 vs. Metro Jets
2025–26	44	37	6	1	0	75	249	93	1st of 8, Great Lake Div; 5th of 77, Premier	Won Div. Semifinals, 2-0 vs. Columbus Mavericks; Lost Div. Finals, 1-2 vs. Metro Jets; Advance Nationals as Wild Card (W, 4-3 Metro))(L, 1-6 Northern)(W, 5-4 Fort Wayne); 2w-1l Pool "C" eliminated

== Alumni ==
The Cherokee have produced a number of alumni playing in higher levels of junior hockey, NCAA and ACHA college programs, and professional hockey.

- Adam Edinger — 5th round draft pick by New York Islanders, played for the Bloomington Prairie Thunder (IHL)
