= Palm Beach Hawks =

- City: Lake Worth, Florida
- League: USPHL - Premier
- Division: Florida
- Founded: 2006
- Folded: 2019
- Home arena: Palm Beach SkateZone
- Colors: Red, black, and white

Franchise history
- 2006–2009: Palm Beach Predators
- 2009–2019: Palm Beach Hawks

The Palm Beach Hawks were an Tier III junior ice hockey team located in Lake Worth, Florida. The organization fielded two Tier III teams with the primary belonging to the United States Premier Hockey League's Premier Division.

== History ==
Established in 2006 as the Palm Beach Predators, the organization was renamed as the Hawks in 2009. The organization were members of the Southeast Junior Hockey League (which became the EJHL South in 2011) from 2006 until 2011. A second team was formed for the 2009–10 season which competed in the Metropolitan Junior Hockey League and then the Empire Junior Hockey League from 2011 to 2013. In 2013, many American junior hockey leagues reorganized and both teams joined the United States Premier Hockey League in the Elite and Empire Divisions, respectively. In 2015, the Empire Division was rebranded to the USP3. In 2017, the USP3 was disbanded, the USPHL added a higher division, and the Hawks' teams were promoted to the Premier and Elite Divisions.

The junior-level Hawks in both the USPHL Premier and Elite were removed from the schedule early in the 2018–19 season.

=== Season by Season ===
Season	League	Division	GP	W	L	T	OTL	Pts	GF	GA	Standing	Playoffs
Palm Beach Predators
2006–07	SEJHL	—	12	3	7	2	—	8	55	87	4th	
2007–08	SEJHL	—	30	14	15	1	—	29	157	138	3rd	
2008–09	Did not participate											
Palm Beach Hawks
2009–10	MetJHL	Florida	35	22	10	0	3	47	181	156	2nd, Florida	
2009–10	SEJHL	—	32	24	7	1	0	49	161	88	2nd	2nd in round robin
2010–11	MetJHL	Southern	37	26	10	0	1	53	228	135	3rd, Southern	
2010–11	SEJHL	—	33	24	9	0	0	48	200	96	2nd	Lost final
2011–12	EJHL South	South	35	23	13	0	1	43	191	157	3rd, South	
2011–12	EmJHL	Southern	40	9	30	1	0	19	94	208	6th, Southern	Did not qualify
2012–13	EJHL South	South	41	11	21	3	6	31	105	162	6th, South	
2012–13	EmJHL	Southern	40	11	26	1	2	25	86	191	7th, Southern	Did not qualify
2013–14	USPHL-Elite	Southern	40	24	9	3	4	55	167	124	2nd, Southern	Eliminated in division quarterfinals
2013–14	USPHL-Empire	Southern	40	21	16	3	0	45	111	112	2nd, Southern	Eliminated in division semifinals
2014–15	USPHL-Elite	South	40	24	13	—	3	51	158	129	2nd, South	Eliminated in division quarterfinals
2014–15	USPHL-Empire	South	40	16	20	—	4	36	129	151	T-7th, South	Eliminated in division quarterfinals
2015–16	USPHL-Elite	South	40	22	12	—	6	50	145	123	T-5th, South	Eliminated in division semifinals
2015–16	USP3	South	40	20	19	—	1	41	162	156	6th, South	Eliminated in division quarterfinals
2016–17	USPHL-Elite	South	40	6	32	—	6	18	121	245	8th, South	Eliminated in division quarterfinals
2016–17	USP3	South	44	20	20	—	4	44	114	154	7th, South	Eliminated in division quarterfinals
2017–18	USPHL-Premier	Florida	44	20	20	—	4	44	182	191	3rd, Florida	Eliminated in division semifinals
2017–18	USPHL-Elite	Florida	44	17	21	—	6	40	149	175	4th, Florida	Eliminated in division semifinals
2018–19	USPHL-Premier	Florida	4	0	4	—	0	0	6	47	Ceased operations midseason	
2018–19	USPHL-Elite	Florida	8	1	7	—	0	2	13	56	Ceased operations midseason	
