= West Chester Wolves =

- City: West Chester, Pennsylvania
- League: United States Premier Hockey League; National Collegiate Development Conference (NCDC)
- Conference: Atlantic
- Founded: 2024*
- Home arena: PNY Sports Arena
- Colors: Purple, white, and black
- General manager: R. C. Lyke
- Head coach: R. C. Lyke
- Affiliates: West Chester Wolves (Tier III)

Franchise history
- 1991–2024: Boston Junior Bruins
- 2024–present: West Chester Wolves

The West Chester Wolves are a Tier II junior ice hockey team playing in the United States Premier Hockey League's (USPHL) National Collegiate Development Conference (NCDC) division. The Wolves play their home games at PNY Sports Arena in West Chester, Pennsylvania.

== History ==
On March 22, 2024, the USPHL announced the addition of the West Chester Wolves to the top division of play (National Collegiate Development Conference). A little over a week later, the Boston Junior Bruins transferred its NCDC franchise to the Wolves. Boston would continue in the USPHL with its Premier Division team that would later be promoted to NCDC.

== Season-by-season records ==
Season	GP	W	L	OTL	SOL	Pts	GF	GA	Regular season finish	Playoffs
2024–25	53	24	25	3	1	52	142	151	5th of 7, Atlantic Div. 14th of 22, NCDC	Lost Div. Qualifier series, 0–2 (Rockets Hockey Club)
2025–26	54	20	26	2	6	48	137	187	7th of 7, Atlantic Div. 23rd of 33, NCDC	Did Not Qualify for Post Season Play
