= Metro Jets =

- City: Mount Clemens, Michigan
- League: USPHL Premier
- Conference: Great Lakes
- Founded: 1989
- Home arena: Mount Clemens Ice Arena
- Colors: Navy blue, white, red
- General manager: Justin Quenneville
- Head coach: Justin Quenneville

Franchise history
- 1989–present: Metro Jets

Championships
- Regular season titles: 2000–01, 2018–19, 2020-21
- Playoff championships: Hurster Cup: 1990, 2001, 2002; Fraser Cup: 2018

The Metro Jets are a junior ice hockey team that plays their home games at Mount Clemens Ice Arena in Mount Clemens, Michigan. They are members of the Great Lakes Conference in the United States Premier Hockey League's Premier Division. Players are ages 16–20, carry amateur status under Junior A guidelines and hope to earn a spot on higher levels of junior ice hockey in the United States and Canada, Canadian major junior, collegiate, and eventually professional teams. The Jets won the 2002 USA Hockey Junior B Silver Cup national championship.

== History ==
The organization was founded by Hal "Butch" and Mary Kay Wolfe as a member of the Metro Detroit Junior Hockey League, a Junior B league sanctioned by USA Hockey, beginning with the 1989–90 season. The Metro Jets played their first season at Inkster Ice Arena in Inkster, Michigan, and then the next 25 seasons at Lakeland Arena in Waterford Township, Michigan. The Metro Detroit Junior Hockey League rebranded back to Central States Hockey League (CSHL) in 1994 and then moved up to Tier III Junior A in 2007. In 2010, the CSHL was rebranded as the North American 3 Hockey League (NA3HL).

In 2015, the Metro Jets were sold to Peter Cammick and began playing at Fraser Hockeyland in Fraser, Michigan. The Jets left the NA3HL in 2018 for the Premier Division of the United States Premier Hockey League. The Jets also added their development team to the USPHL Premier after the Lake Erie Bighorns withdrew prior to the 2018–19 season.

In 2021, the organization moved to Mount Clemens, Michigan, to play out of the Mount Clemens Ice Arena and added Professional Broadcaster, Matt Prieur to serve as the Voice of the Metro Jets Hockey Club.

2022 is the 34th year of operation for the Metro Jets Hockey Club and Fifth year of operation for MJDP (Metro Jets Development Program)

== Alumni ==
The Metro Jets have had several alumni move on to higher levels of junior ice hockey, NCAA Division I, Division III, ACHA college, at professional levels. Jon Cooper coached the Jets to the 2002 USA Hockey Silver Cup National Junior B Championship and later became the head coach of the Tampa Bay Lightning. Steven Oleksy was the first Jets' alumni to play in the National Hockey League when he made his debut with the Washington Capitals in 2013.

== Season-by-season records ==
Season	GP	W	L	OTL	SOL	Pts	GF	GA	Finish	Playoffs
2014–15	47	32	12	2	—	66	204	127	1st of 6, East Div. 7th of 31, NA3HL	Won Div. Semifinals, 2–0 vs. Southern Tier Xpress; Won Div. Finals, 2–1 vs. Pittsburgh Vengeance; 1–1–1, 4th of 4 in Silver Cup round-robin Pool A (OTL, 2–3 vs. Jr. Predators; W, 3–1 vs. Americans; L, 1–6 vs. Lumberjacks)
2015–16	47	40	5	2	—	82	244	961	1st of 6, East Div. 2nd of 34, NA3HL	Won Div. Semifinals, 2–0 vs. Wooster Oilers; Won Div. Finals, 2–0 vs. West Michigan Wolves; 3–0–0, 1st of 4 in Silver Cup round-robin Pool B (W, 7–0 vs. Jr. Brahmas; W, 2–1 vs. Steel; W, 7–3 vs. Jr. Blues); Won Semifinal, 5–4 vs. Great Falls Americans; Lost Championship game, 1–4 vs. North Iowa Bulls
2016–17	47	47	0	0	0	94	262	55	1st of 6, East Div. 1st of 48, NA3HL	Won Div. Semifinals, 2–1 vs. West Michigan Wolves; Won Div. Finals, 2–1 vs. Pittsburgh Vengeance; 2–1–0, 1st of 4 in Silver Cup round-robin Pool A (W, 3–0 vs.Lumberjacks; L, 2–3 vs. Capitals; W, 5–3 vs. Jr. Blues); Won Silver Cup semifinal game, 6–1 vs. Yellowstone Quake; Lost Silver Cup Championship game, 1–2 vs. Granite City Lumberjacks
2017–18	47	40	6	1	0	81	238	95	1st of 6, East Div. 3rd of 42, NA3HL	Won Div. Semifinals, 2–0 vs. Southern Tier Xpress; Won Div. Finals, 2–0 vs. Pittsburgh Vengeance; 3–0–0 in Fraser Cup round-robin Pool B (W, 4–1 vs. Freeze; W, 2–1 vs. Stars;W, 4–1 vs. Brahmas); Won Fraser Cup semifinal game, 3–2 vs. Granite City Lumberjacks; Won Fraser Cup Final game, 3–2 vs. St. Louis Jr. Blues
2018–19	44	39	4	1	0	79	197	79	1st of 6, Great Lakes Conf. 1st of 52, USPHL-Premier	Won Div. Nationals qualifiers, 2–0 vs. Lansing Wolves; 2–0–1 USPHL-Premier Nationals round-robin Pool A (T, 2–2 vs. Jr. Blades; W, 5–1 vs. Cougars; W, 7–3 vs. Nighthawks); Won Semifinal game, 7–1 vs. Minnesota Blue Ox; Lost Championship game, 2–5 vs. Hampton Roads Whalers
2019–20	44	36	7	1	0	73	271	87	1st of 6, Great Lakes; 3rd of 52, USPHL-Premier	Won Div. Nationals qualifiers, 2–0 vs. Lake Erie Bighorns; 0–1–0 USPHL-Premier Nationals round-robin Pool D (L, 1–2 vs. Moose; vs. Jr. Comets; vs. Whalers); Tournament cancelled due to COVID-19 pandemic
2020–21	43	38	4	1	0	77	234	74	1st of 7, Great Lakes; 1st of 63, USPHL-Premier	Won Div. Nationals qualifiers, 2–0 vs. Columbus Mavericks; 0–3–0, 4th of 4 USPHL-Premier Nationals round-robin Pool A (L, 2–4 vs. Elmira Jr. Enforcers; L, 2–4 vs. Northern Cyclones; L, 0–1 vs. Charleston Colonials)
2021–22	44	39	4	1	0	79	327	67	1st of 7, Great Lakes; 2nd of 64, USPHL-Premier	Won Div. Nationals qualifiers, 2–0 vs. Pittsburgh Vengeance; 2–1–0, 2nd of 4 USPHL-Premier Nationals round-robin Pool A (W, 2–0 vs. Florida Jr. Blades; W, 7–4 vs. Islanders Hockey Club; L, 1–3 vs. Wilkes-Barre/Scranton Knights); Won Quarterfinal game, 3–1 vs. Toledo Cherokee; Won Semifinal game, 8–1 vs. Wilkes-Barre/Scranton Knights; Lost National Finals game, 2–3 vs. New Jersey Rockets
2022–23	44	35	8	1	0	71	252	72	2nd of 4, Great Lakes; 10th of 69, USPHL-Premier	Won Div. qualifiers, 2–0 vs. Columbus Mavericks; Seeding Round: (W, 4–2 vs. Las Vegas Thunderbirds; W, 7–2 vs. New York Aviators); Won Round of 16, 4–2 vs. Ogden Mustangs; Lost Quarterfinal game, 1–5 vs. Florida Eels
2023–24	43	38	2	2	1	79	259	71	1st of 6, Great Lakes; 3rd of 61, USPHL-Premier	tbd Div. semifinals, 2–0 vs. Buffalo Stampede; Advance to Nationals
2024–25	44	36	8	—	—	72	261	70	1st of 7, Great Lakes; 5th of 71, USPHL-Premier	Won Div. semifinals, 2–0 vs. Cincinnati Jr. Cyclones; Won Div Finals 2–1 Toledo Cherokee; Divisional Round Robin 2–1 (W 4–3 Tampa Bay) (W 2–0 Islanders) (L 0–6 Springfield); 4th of 6 Pool 1 - eliminated
2025–26	44	36	7	—	—1	73	223	82	2nd of 8, Great Lakes; 9th of 77, USPHL-Premier	Won Div. semifinals, 2–0 vs. Red River Spartans; Won Div Finals 2–1 Toledo Cherokee; Nationals Pool "C" 1-2 (L 3-4 Toledo) (W 7-2 Fort Wayne) (L 1–6 Northern) eliminated
