= Cal Marvin =

American ice hockey player

- Born: April 29, 1924 Warroad, Minnesota, USA
- Died: September 5, 2004 (aged 80) Grand Forks, North Dakota, USA
- Position: Defenseman
- Played for: North Dakota
- Playing career: 1947–1951
- Military career
- Burial place: Riverside Cemetery
- Allegiance: United States
- Branch: United States Marine Corps
- Service years: 1943-1945
- Rank: Private first class

Calvin Coolidge "Cal" Marvin (April 29, 1924 – May 9, 2004) was an American ice hockey defenseman and coach who led the Warroad Lakers for nearly 50 years and was inducted into the United States Hockey Hall of Fame in 1982.

== Career ==
Marvin's father George immigrated to Warroad from Canada and bought a lumber company that would eventually become Marvin Windows. Calvin with the fifth of five boys and while three of his brothers would work for the family company, Cal would find a different career path. Cal served in the marines during World War II, fighting on Saipan during the Mariana and Palau Islands campaign. Even in the midst of the war, Marvin was enamored with hockey and wanted his small hometown to have a rink of its own; he named the Warroad Arena Fund as the beneficiary of his $10,000 life insurance policy (roughly $145,000 in 2020). After returning from the war, Marvin and Dick Roberts held several fundraisers for the community and by 1947 had raised enough money to build the city's first ice rink.

Before the rink had been built, however, Cal had put together the first Lakers team in 1946 to compete against other senior teams in north-western Minnesota. Marvin had also began attending the University of North Dakota in 1946 and with the help of Red Jarrett he brought back the varsity ice hockey team. Marvin brought in most of the players for the first few years, including many of the players on the Warroad Lakers. Marvin began playing for the team in his sophomore season and also served as an assistant coach for Don Norman. Because college games were usually only played on Friday or Saturday, Marvin and many of his Fighting Sioux teammates were able to concurrently play for both UND and the Warroad Lakers.

Cal retired as a player after the 1951 season but remained as the Lakers' head coach for most of the next 45 years, leading the team to the 1955 United States Intermediate title, and the Canadian Intermediate Championship in both 1964 and 1974. He took a short leave to coach the US National Team at the 1958 Ice Hockey World Championships, finishing fifth out of eight. With all of his accomplishments, it was the players that he coached that proved to be Marvin's greatest legacy. Over a dozen Lakers alumni played for the US National Team including Bill and Roger Christian, who won gold medals at the 1960 Winter Olympics. Several players also reached the NHL like Henry Boucha, Clarence Schmidt and Dave Christian (Bill's son).

Towards the end of the Lakers' existence, then being coached by Marvin's son David, the team produced an incredible run by winning three consecutive Allan Cups (1994-1996) and narrowly missing out on a fourth in 1997; no other team has won more than two in a row. Warroad was also one of only two American teams to win the Cup (the other being the Spokane Jets\Flyers). The Lakers suspended operating after 1997 when they couldn't find a league to play in but returned for a brief time in 2001 as the 'Islanders'. They competed in two more Allen Cup tournaments before stopping for good in 2003.

Over the course of his career Marvin was inducted into the Warroad High School Athletic Hall of Fame, North Dakota Athletic Hall of Fame (1977), United States Hockey Hall of Fame (1982) and Manitoba Hockey Hall of Fame (1997).

== Personal ==
Marvin and his wife Beth married in 1949 and had 12 children. The two remained together until his death in 2004.

== Statistics ==
=== Regular season and playoffs ===
			Regular season					Playoffs
Season	Team	League	GP	G	A	Pts	PIM	GP	G	A	Pts	PIM
1947–48	North Dakota	NCAA	10	0	1	1	2	—	—	—	—	—
1947–48	Warroad Lakers	SDHL	—	—	—	—	—	—	—	—	—	—
1948–49	North Dakota	NCAA	22	0	4	4	24	—	—	—	—	—
1948–49	Warroad Lakers	SDHL	—	—	—	—	—	—	—	—	—	—
1949–50	North Dakota	NCAA	23	0	5	5	6	—	—	—	—	—
1950–51	Crookston Pirates	NWHL-Sr.	—	—	—	—	—	—	—	—	—	—
NCAA totals			55	0	10	10	32	—	—	—	—	—
