= Warroad Lakers =

Defunct senior ice hockey club

- City: Warroad, Minnesota
- League: SEMHL
- Folded: 1998
- Home arena: Warroad Memorial Arena (1949-1992); The Gardens Arena (1993-2003)
- Colours
- General manager: Cal Marvin
- Head coach: Cal Marvin

Franchise history
- 1946–1998: Warroad Lakers
- 2001–2003: Warroad Islanders

Championships
- Allan Cups: 1994; 1995; 1996
- Hardy Cups: 1994

The Warroad Lakers were a senior ice hockey club from Warroad, Minnesota. The Lakers played in various Manitoba AHA and Thunder Bay AHA senior and intermediate leagues and were granted special eligibility for the Allan Cup and Hardy Cup by the Canadian Amateur Hockey Association. The Lakers were three-time Allan Cup Canadian National Champions, one-time Allan Cup National Finalists, one-time Hardy Cup Canadian National Champions, and one-time Hardy Cup National Finalists.

== History ==
The Lakers were Western Canada Intermediate "A" Champions in 1964, 1974, and 1977, Thunder Bay Intermediate "A" Champions in 1963 and 1964, and Manitoba Intermediate "A" Champions in at least 1971, 1974, and 1977. They were also Thunder Bay Senior "A" Champions in 1965 and Manitoba Senior "A" Champions in at least 1969, 1992, 1993, 1994, 1995, 1996, and 1997.

At the 1974 Hardy Cup, the Lakers faced the Ottawa District Hockey Association's Embrun Panthers. The Lakers swept them 3-games-to-none to win their only Hardy Cup. Three years later, the Lakers faced New Brunswick's Campbellton Tigers at the 1977 Hardy Cup, but fell 3-games-to-1.

The Warroad Lakers are only the second American team in Allan Cup history to be Canadian National Senior "AAA" Champions. They won the 1994 Allan Cup on home ice, the next year they won the 1995 Allan Cup in Stony Plain, Alberta, and then won the 1996 Allan Cup in Unity, Saskatchewan to become the only team in history to win three consecutive Allan Cups. A season later, the Lakers failed to defeat the Powell River Regals in the 1997 Allan Cup final, which would have given them four in a row if won.

In 1997, after finding themselves without a league to play in, the Warroad Lakers were forced to fold.

Around 2001, the team was resurrected and named the Warroad Islanders. They competed in the 2002 Allan Cup but failed to get out of the round robin. In 2003, the Islanders failed to get past the Ile des Chenes North Stars (who won the 2003 Allan Cup) in the Manitoba playdowns. Soon after, the team fell off the competitive hockey map.

All three of the Lakers' Allan Cup winning teams have been inducted into the Manitoba Hockey Hall of Fame.

== Season-by-season results ==
Season	GP	W	L	T	GF	GA	P	Results	Playoffs
1946-47	--	--	-	-	--	--	--	1st States Dominion League	Won Title Game 10-2 vs. Roseau
1947-48	Statistics Not Available								
1948-49	Statistics Not Available								
1949-50	Statistics Not Available								
1950-51	Statistics Not Available								
1951-52	Statistics Not Available								
1952-53	Statistics Not Available								
1953-54	Statistics Not Available								
1954-55	--	--	-	-	--	--	--	1st Northwest League	Northwest League Champions; U.S. National Open Intermediate champions
1955-56	28	21	6	1	--	--	--	1st Northwest League	Northwest League Champions
1956-57	21	18	3	0	--	--	--	1st Northwest League	Northwest League Champions
1957-58	18	12	6	0	112	53	24	1st MinOHL	Won League
1958-59	16	12	4	0	87	45	24	1st MinOHL	Won League
1959-60	18	15	3	0	--	--	30	1st MinOHL	Won League
1960-61	39	25	13	1	--	--	--	1st MinOHL	Won League
1961-62	13	11	2	0	86	43	35	1st MinOHL	Lost final
1962-63	40	26	13	1	--	--	--	1st MinOHL	Lost final
1963-64	--	--	--	-	--	--	--		Canadian Intermediate champions
1964-65	16	14	2	0	74	48	--	MIHL Exh.	Lost Western Canada Final
1965-66	24	15	4	5	127	79	35	1st MSHL	Lost semi-final
1966-67	24	15	9	0	119	105	30	3rd MSHL	Lost semi-final
1967-68	24	8	15	1	88	88	17	4th MSHL	DNQ
1968-69	23	13	10	0	--	--	26	1st MSHL	Won League
1969-70	24	18	6	0	160	90	36	1st MSHL	Lost final
1970-71	17	12	5	0	88	74	24	2nd MSHL	Won League Intermediate Final
1971-72	24	21	3	0	134	73	42	2nd CCHL	Won League Intermediate Final
1972-73	30	23	7	0	172	84	60	2nd CCHL	Won League Intermediate Final
1973-74	24	18	5	1	164	84	37	1st CCHL	Won League; Won Hardy Cup
1974-75	Statistics Not Available								
1975-76	Statistics Not Available								
1976-77	Statistics Not Available								
1977-78	Statistics Not Available								
1978-79	The Manitoba Amateur Hockey Association decided in May 1979 that Warroad would no longer be allowed to represent Manitoba in intermediate AA hockey play-off competition.								
1979-80	32	20	12	0	--	--	40	1st CASHL	Lost final
1980-81	32	15	15	2	163	152	32	3rd CASHL	Lost semi-final
1981-82	29	9	20	0	128	157	18	4th CASHL	Lost semi-final
1982-83	32	11	20	1	169	182	23	5th CASHL	Lost semi-final
1983-84	34	15	18	1	182	195	35	5th CASHL	Lost quarter-final
1984-85	Statistics Not Available								
1985-86	Statistics Not Available								
1986-87	Statistics Not Available								
1987-88	Statistics Not Available								
1988-89	Statistics Not Available								
1989-90	Statistics Not Available								
1990-91	Statistics Not Available								
1991-92	Statistics Not Available								
1992-93	46	33	11	2	--	--	--		Central Amateur Senior Hockey League; Manitoba-Saskatchewan; Western Canada Champions
1993-94	Statistics Not Available								
1994-95	12	8	3	1	--	--	--	SEMHL Exh.	Won Pattison Cup; Won Allan Cup
1995-96	36	35	1	0	--	--	--	SEMHL Exh.	Won Pattison Cup; Western Canada champions Won Allan Cup
1996-97	16	16	0	0	187	47	--	HTHL Exh.	Won Pattison Cup; Lost Allan Cup Final

== Notable alumni ==
- Henry Boucha
- Bill Christian
- Dave Christian
- Roger Christian
- Blane Comstock
- Chad Erickson
- Alan Hangsleben
- Jim Henry
- Ken Johannson
- Bob Johnson
- Julian Klymkiw
- Ed Kryzanowski
- Larry Olimb
- Dave Richardson
- Clarence Schmidt
- Wyatt Smith
- Art Stratton

== See also ==
- List of ice hockey teams in Manitoba
