= Trent Kaese =

Canadian ice hockey player

- Born: September 9, 1967 (age 58) Nanaimo, British Columbia, Canada
- Height: 6 ft 0 in (183 cm)
- Weight: 210 lb (95 kg; 15 st 0 lb)
- Position: Right wing
- Shot: Right
- Played for: Milton Keynes Kings; Peterborough Pirates; Buffalo Sabres
- NHL draft: 161st overall, 1985; Buffalo Sabres
- Playing career: 1987–1995

Trent Kaese (born September 9, 1967) is a Canadian former professional ice hockey right wing. He was drafted in the eighth round, 161st overall, by the Buffalo Sabres in the 1985 NHL entry draft. He played one game in the National Hockey League with the Sabres during the 1988–89 season, on March 25, 1989 against the Quebec Nordiques. The rest of his career, which lasted from 1987 to 1995, was spent in various minor leagues and then by several seasons in the British Hockey League.

== Career statistics ==
=== Regular season and playoffs ===
			Regular season					Playoffs
Season	Team	League	GP	G	A	Pts	PIM	GP	G	A	Pts	PIM
1983–84	Lethbridge Broncos	WHL	64	6	6	12	33	1	0	0	0	0
1984–85	Lethbridge Broncos	WHL	67	20	18	38	107	4	0	1	1	7
1985–86	Lethbridge Broncos	WHL	67	24	41	65	67	10	5	3	8	9
1986–87	Swift Current Broncos	WHL	2	1	0	1	4	—	—	—	—	—
1986–87	Calgary Wranglers	WHL	68	30	24	54	117	—	—	—	—	—
1986–87	Flint Spirits	IHL	1	0	0	0	0	6	4	1	5	9
1987–88	Flint Spirits	IHL	43	11	26	37	58	12	6	6	12	21
1987–88	Rochester Americans	AHL	37	6	11	17	32	3	2	1	3	2
1988–89	Flint Spirits	IHL	9	2	3	5	61	—	—	—	—	—
1988–89	Rochester Americans	AHL	45	9	11	20	68	—	—	—	—	—
1988–89	Buffalo Sabres	NHL	1	0	0	0	0	—	—	—	—	—
1989–90	Phoenix Roadrunners	IHL	2	0	1	1	2	—	—	—	—	—
1989–90	Winston-Salem Thunderbirds	ECHL	57	56	51	107	110	8	5	1	6	18
1990–91	Peterborough Pirates	BHL	26	68	32	100	81	8	18	7	25	14
1991–92	Columbus Chill	ECHL	28	28	22	50	56	—	—	—	—	—
1991–92	Peterborough Pirates	BHL	15	18	18	36	36	—	—	—	—	—
1992–93	Peterborough Pirates	BHL	36	81	45	126	126	—	—	—	—	—
1993–94	Milton Keynes Kings	BD1	43	96	92	188	157	—	—	—	—	—
1994–95	Milton Keynes Kings	BHL	11	7	10	17	22	—	—	—	—	—
1994–95	Blackburn Hawks	BD1	28	50	50	100	80	—	—	—	—	—
1997–98	Powell River Regals	CCHL	—	—	—	—	—	3	2	0	2	0
1997–98	Powell River Regals	Al-Cup	—	—	—	—	—	3	2	0	2	0
1998–99	Powell River Regals	CCHL	—	—	—	—	—	5	4	2	6	0
1998–99	Powell River Regals	Al-Cup	—	—	—	—	—	5	4	2	6	0
1999–00	Powell River Regals	CCHL	—	—	—	—	—	4	3	3	6	4
1999–00	Powell River Regals	Al-Cup	—	—	—	—	—	4	3	3	6	4
BHL totals			88	174	105	279	265	14	32	20	52	26
NHL totals			1	0	0	0	0	—	—	—	—	—

== See also ==
- List of players who played only one game in the NHL
