= 2002 Allan Cup =

Canadian senior ice hockey championship

The Allan Cup trophy

The 2002 Allan Cup was the Canadian senior ice hockey championship for the 2001–02 senior "AAA" season. The event was hosted by the Powell River Regals in Powell River, British Columbia. The 2002 tournament marked the 94th year that the Allan Cup has been awarded.

== Teams ==
- Powell River Regals (Host)
- St-Georges Garaga (East)
- Stony Plain Eagles (Pacific)
- Warroad Islanders (West)

== Results ==
Round Robin

Stony Plain Eagles 5 - Warroad Islanders 2
St-Georges Garaga 2 - Powell River Regals 0
St-Georges Garaga 6 - Warroad Islanders 3
Powell River Regals 5 - Stony Plain Eagles 4
Stony Plain Eagles 5 - St-Georges Garaga 2
Powell River Regals 6 - Warroad Islanders 5 (OT)

Semi-final

St-Georges Garaga 4 - Powell River Regals 3 (OT)

Final

St-Georges Garaga 4 - Stony Plain Eagles 2
