= KRRT =

KRRT may refer to:

- KRRT (FM), a radio station (90.9 FM) licensed to Arroyo Seco, New Mexico, United States
- KMYS, a television station (channel 35 analog/32 digital) licensed to Kerrville, Texas, which held the call sign KRRT from August 1984 to June 2006
- Warroad International Airport (ICAO code KRRT)
