= Brock Nelson =

American ice hockey player (born 1991)

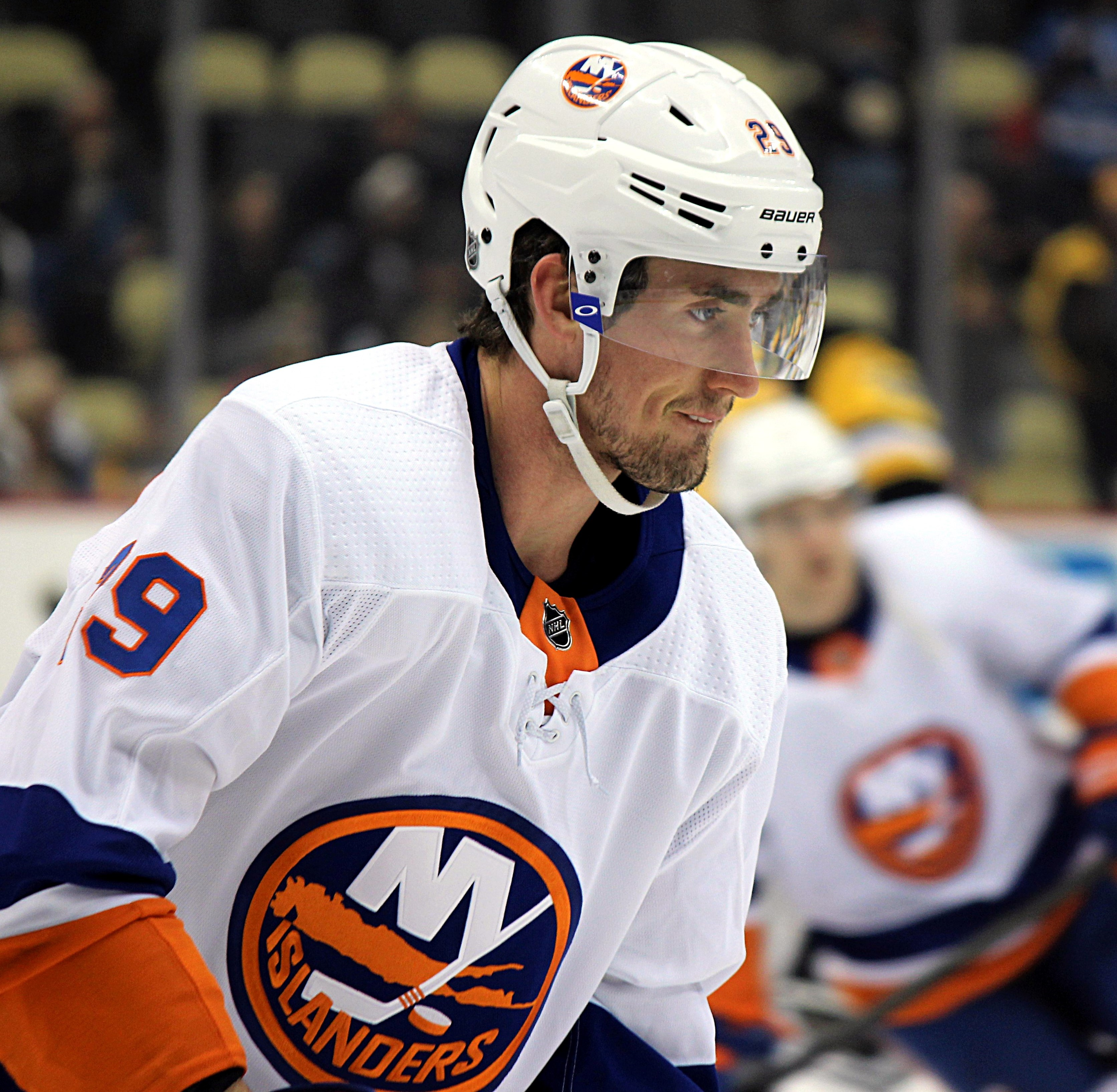
- Nelson with the New York Islanders in 2018
- Born: October 15, 1991 (age 35) Minneapolis, Minnesota, U.S.
- Height: 6 ft 3 in (191 cm)
- Weight: 205 lb (93 kg; 14 st 9 lb)
- Position: Center
- Shoots: Left
- NHL team Former teams: Colorado Avalanche; New York Islanders
- National team: United States
- NHL draft: 30th overall, 2010; New York Islanders
- Playing career: 2012–present

Brock Christian Nelson (born October 15, 1991) is an American professional ice hockey player who is a center for the Colorado Avalanche of the National Hockey League (NHL). Nelson was drafted 30th overall in the first round of the 2010 NHL entry draft by the New York Islanders. Prior to playing at professional level, Nelson played for the University of North Dakota. His first experience in professional level was in the American Hockey League (AHL) with the Islanders' affiliate, the Bridgeport Sound Tigers. Once he reached the NHL on a full-time basis, he would go on to play eleven seasons with the Islanders before being traded to the Avalanche. Nelson won a gold medal with Team USA in the 2026 Winter Olympics.

== Playing career ==
=== Early career ===
Nelson played ice hockey at Warroad High School, where he was a finalist for the Minnesota Mr. Hockey Award, given to the top Minnesota high school player. He finished the 2009–10 season with 39 goals and 34 assists for 73 points in 25 games for Warroad. On September 24, 2009, Nelson committed to play college ice hockey for the University of North Dakota after considering Bemidji State and Nebraska Omaha and later partook in the 2010 USA Hockey National Junior Evaluation Camp. Nelson was selected 30th overall by the New York Islanders of the National Hockey League (NHL) in the 2010 NHL entry draft.

=== Collegiate ===
Nelson competed with the University of North Dakota Fighting Sioux for two seasons while majoring in pre-investments. He recorded his first collegiate goal on a power play to lift the Fighting Sioux 3–2 over Minnesota Duluth. Later in the season, he recorded his first two-goal game in a win over Robert Morris Colonials. He recorded a goal off an assist from Joe Gleason to help lead the Fighting Sioux to the WCHA Final Five. Nelson ended the season with the Tom Hoghaug Memorial Scholarship as he led all Sioux freshmen in points and goals. He was also named to the All-WCHA Team and WCHA All-Tournament Team.

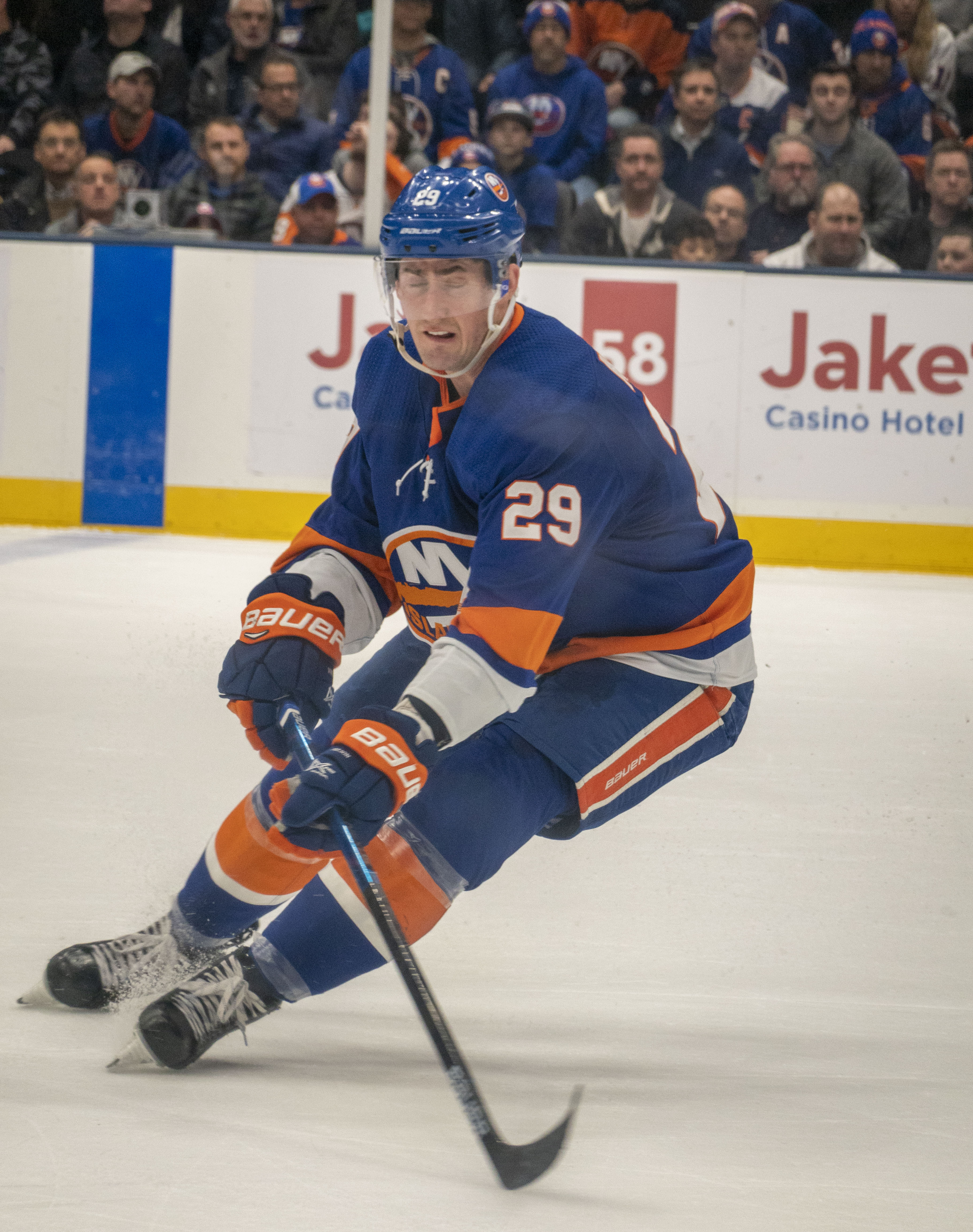
Brock Nelson with the Islanders in 2020

In his sophomore season, Nelson played on a line with Corban Knight and Danny Kristo. By the conclusion of the 2011–12 season, Nelson was named to the All-WCHA Third Team after leading all WCHA players with 20 goals and becoming UND's youngest 20 goal scorer since Jonathan Toews. He was also named a Inside College Hockey All-American, to College Hockey News Second Team, and Inside College Hockey's WCHA Breakthrough Player of the Year. Nelson ended his collegiate career by signing an Entry Level Contract with the New York Islanders on April 3, 2012.

=== Professional ===
==== New York Islanders ====
Nelson began his professional career with the Islanders' minor league affiliate, the American Hockey League's (AHL) Bridgeport Sound Tigers after the 2011–12 season, during the 2012 Calder Cup playoffs. He eventually made his NHL debut during the 2013 Stanley Cup playoffs with the Islanders after the 2012–13 regular season. He registered his first NHL point the following season on October 8, 2013, an assist on a goal by Peter Regin in a 6–1 win against the Phoenix Coyotes. His first NHL goal was scored on October 22, 2013, against Roberto Luongo of the Vancouver Canucks.

On October 9, 2017, St. Louis Blues enforcer Robert Bortuzzo cross-checked Nelson multiple times while he was down after Nelson collided with a teammate. Bortuzzo was later fined $3,091.40.

On May 23, 2019, after a career year in the 2018–19 season with 53 points under Barry Trotz, Nelson signed a six-year, $36 million contract to remain with the Islanders.

On April 5, 2021, Nelson was named alternate captain of the Islanders in absence of the injured Anders Lee.

On November 4, 2021, Nelson scored a career-high four goals in a 6-2 win against the Montreal Canadiens.

On November 23, 2021, it was announced that Nelson would be out from two to four weeks with a lower-body injury.

In the 2024–25 season, the final season of his six-year contract in New York, Nelson continued to contribute in a top-six scoring role in posting 20 goals and 43 points through 61 regular-season games. Approaching the NHL trade deadline and with the Islanders on the outside of playoff contention, Nelson's 13-year tenure with the team ended as he was traded along with Islanders' prospect William Dufour, to the Colorado Avalanche in exchange for Calum Ritchie, Oliver Kylington, a conditional first and third-round picks on March 6, 2025.

==== Colorado Avalanche ====
Nelson appeared in 19 games with the Avalanche during the 2024–25 regular season, posting six goals and seven assists in that span. He scored his 300th career NHL goal on April 12 in a game against the Los Angeles Kings. The Avalanche qualified to the 2025 Stanley Cup playoffs, but were ousted in the first round by the Dallas Stars. Nelson had two assists in seven playoff games.

On June 4, 2025, Nelson signed a 3-year, $22.5 million contract extension to remain with the Avalanche. During a November 29, 2025, game against the Montreal Canadiens, he registered the 600th point of his career with a goal scored on Jakub Dobeš. He recorded his first hat-trick with the Avalanche during a 4–1 win over the Toronto Maple Leafs on January 25, 2026. In an April 13 meeting with the Edmonton Oilers, Nelson appeared in his 1,000th NHL game, becoming the 425th player to do so. He finished the 2025–26 regular season with 33 goals and 32 assists in 81 games. His performance on Colorado's penalty kill unit was noted, and in recognition of his defensive play the Professional Hockey Writers' Association voted Nelson a finalist for the Frank J. Selke Trophy, awarded annually to the NHL's best defensive forward.

== International play ==
Medal record

Men's ice hockey

Representing the United States

Olympic Games
Gold medal – first place	2026 Milano Cortina	

World Championships
Bronze medal – third place	2015 Czech Republic	

World Junior Championships
Bronze medal – third place	2011 United States	

Nelson plays internationally for the United States. At the 2011 World Junior Championships, Nelson helped the Americans to a bronze medal, recording one assist in 5 games. Nelson was selected as an alternate captain for Team USA in the 2017 IIHF World Championship.

On January 2, 2026, he was named to Team USA's roster for the 2026 Winter Olympics.

On February 12, 2026, Nelson scored two goals (including the game winner) in a 5–1 win against Latvia. He scored another goal and assist in the game that was wiped out by two Latvia's coach's challenges.

On February 22, 2026, Nelson helped Team USA defeat Canada to win the gold medal in men's hockey during the 2026 Winter Olympics. Team USA won 2-1 in overtime, claiming gold in men's hockey for the first time 46 years. Nelson didn't score in the gold medal game, but was a key piece on Team USA's penalty kill which went a perfect 18 for 18 during the tournament. Nelson is the third generation of his family to represent and win gold for Team USA in men's hockey at the Olympics.

Amid online backlash faced by the men's Olympic hockey team regarding the inclusion of FBI director Kash Patel during their gold medal celebrations and members of the team laughing at President Trump's comments of being impeached if he did not invite the women's team to the White House, the team was invited to meet the president and attend the State of the Union. Nelson did not visit the White House or attend the State of the Union.

== Personal life ==
Nelson's uncle Dave Christian was on the U.S. Olympic Hockey Team that won the gold medal at the 1980 Winter Olympics, as well as being an NHL veteran with over 1,000 games. His grandfather, Bill Christian, and great uncle, Roger Christian, were both on the U.S. Olympic Hockey Team that won the gold medal at the 1960 Winter Olympics, America's first-ever ice hockey gold. They also founded Christian Brothers, a company that made ice hockey sticks in Warroad, Minnesota, from 1964 to 2003. Another great uncle, Gordon Christian, was on the U.S. Olympic Hockey Team that won the silver medal at the 1956 Winter Olympics. While his mother did not partake in competitive ice hockey, she was a figure skater.

Nelson's wife Karley Sylvester is a former Minnesota Ms. Hockey and competed on the University of Wisconsin's women's ice hockey team under head coach Mark Johnson, who was Dave Christian's teammate on the 1980 team. Together, they have four children.

== Career statistics ==
=== Regular season and playoffs ===
			Regular season					Playoffs
Season	Team	League	GP	G	A	Pts	PIM	GP	G	A	Pts	PIM
2007–08	Warroad High School	MNHS	24	12	7	19	2	3	1	1	2	0
2008–09	Warroad High School	MNHS	25	35	23	58	14	3	6	5	11	0
2009–10	Warroad High School	MNHS	25	39	34	73	38	3	8	4	12	6
2009–10	Team Great Plains	MHSEL	24	16	16	32	12	—	—	—	—	—
2010–11	University of North Dakota	WCHA	42	8	13	21	27	—	—	—	—	—
2011–12	University of North Dakota	WCHA	42	28	19	47	4	—	—	—	—	—
2011–12	Bridgeport Sound Tigers	AHL	4	0	0	0	0	2	0	0	0	0
2012–13	Bridgeport Sound Tigers	AHL	66	25	27	52	34	—	—	—	—	—
2012–13	New York Islanders	NHL	—	—	—	—	—	1	0	0	0	0
2013–14	New York Islanders	NHL	72	14	12	26	12	—	—	—	—	—
2013–14	Bridgeport Sound Tigers	AHL	1	0	1	1	2	—	—	—	—	—
2014–15	New York Islanders	NHL	82	20	22	42	24	6	2	0	2	2
2015–16	New York Islanders	NHL	81	26	14	40	30	11	1	4	5	6
2016–17	New York Islanders	NHL	81	20	25	45	36	—	—	—	—	—
2017–18	New York Islanders	NHL	82	19	16	35	43	—	—	—	—	—
2018–19	New York Islanders	NHL	82	25	28	53	28	8	4	0	4	2
2019–20	New York Islanders	NHL	68	26	28	54	32	22	9	9	18	12
2020–21	New York Islanders	NHL	56	18	15	33	14	19	7	5	12	4
2021–22	New York Islanders	NHL	72	37	22	59	33	—	—	—	—	—
2022–23	New York Islanders	NHL	82	36	39	75	24	6	2	3	5	4
2023–24	New York Islanders	NHL	82	34	35	69	28	5	2	2	4	10
2024–25	New York Islanders	NHL	61	20	23	43	14	—	—	—	—	—
2024–25	Colorado Avalanche	NHL	19	6	7	13	4	7	0	4	4	2
2025–26	Colorado Avalanche	NHL	81	33	32	65	36	13	2	1	3	10
NHL totals			1,001	334	318	652	358	98	29	28	57	52

=== International ===
Year	Team	Event	Result	GP	G	A	Pts	PIM
2011	United States	WJC	3rd place, bronze medalist(s)	5	0	1	1	0
2014	United States	WC	6th	8	5	2	7	20
2015	United States	WC	3rd place, bronze medalist(s)	10	6	4	10	8
2016	United States	WC	4th	6	1	3	4	2
2017	United States	WC	5th	8	4	3	7	2
2024	United States	WC	5th	8	3	4	7	4
2025	United States	4NF	2nd place, silver medalist(s)	4	0	0	0	0
2026	United States	OG	1st place, gold medalist(s)	6	2	1	3	0
Junior totals				5	0	1	1	0
Senior totals				50	21	17	38	36

== Awards and honors ==
Award	Year	Ref
College
All-WCHA Third Team	2012	
WCHA All-Tournament Team	2012	
NHL
NHL All-Star Game	2023	

Awards and achievements
Preceded by Nino Niederreiter	New York Islanders first round pick 2010	Succeeded by Ryan Strome
