= 1995 Allan Cup =

Canadian senior ice hockey championship

The Allan Cup trophy

The 1995 Allan Cup was the Canadian senior ice hockey championship for the 1994–95 senior "AAA" season. The event was hosted by the Stony Plain Eagles in Stony Plain, Alberta. The 1995 tournament marked the 87th time that the Allan Cup had been awarded.

The Warroad Lakers won their second consecutive Allan Cup title in 1995, this would mark the sixth time an American club would win the Canadian Senior "AAA" title.

== Teams ==
- Powell River Regals (Pacific)
- Stony Plain Eagles (Host)
- Truro Bearcats (East)
- Warroad Lakers (West)

== Results ==
Round Robin

Warroad Lakers 9 - Powell River Regals 1
Truro Bearcats 5 - Stony Plain Eagles 5
Powell River Regals 6 - Truro Bearcats 1
Warroad Lakers 3 - Stony Plain Eagles 2
Truro Bearcats 10 - Warroad Lakers 5
Stony Plain Eagles 5 - Powell River Regals 3

Semi-final

Stony Plain Eagles 5 - Truro Bearcats 3

Final

Warroad Lakers 3 - Stony Plain Eagles 2
