= 1994 Allan Cup =

Canadian senior ice hockey championship

The Allan Cup trophy

The 1994 Allan Cup was the Canadian senior ice hockey championship for the 1993–94 senior "AAA" season. The event was hosted by the Warroad Lakers in Warroad, Minnesota. The 1994 tournament marked the 86th time that the Allan Cup has been awarded.

The 1994 Allan Cup was a very strange year for Canadian Senior hockey. The 1994 Allan Cup marked the first time the Allan Cup round robin was hosted by an American city, although four Allan Cup playoff finals had previously been hosted in the US. It was also the fifth time in 86 championships that the Cup was won by an American team. In another strange turn of events, possibly in protest of the venue, no teams from Eastern Canada participated in the event. There was a similar problem at the 1993 Allan Cup tournament in Quesnel, British Columbia.

== Teams ==
- St. Boniface Mohawks (Manitoba)
- Stony Plain Eagles (Pacific)
- Unity Miners (Saskatchewan)
- Warroad Lakers (Host)

== Results ==
Round Robin

St. Boniface Mohawks 6 - Unity Miners 1
Warroad Lakers 6 - Stony Plain Eagles 4
St. Boniface Mohawks 5 - Stony Plain Eagles 3
Warroad Lakers 5 - Unity Miners 2
Stony Plain Eagles 7 - Unity Miners 4
St. Boniface Mohawks 7 - Warroad Lakers 5

Semi-final

Warroad Lakers 4 - Stony Plain Eagles 0

Final

Warroad Lakers 5 - St. Boniface Mohawks 2
