= Gordon Christian =

American ice hockey player

Personal information
- Full name: Gordon Eugene Christian
- Born: November 21, 1927 Warroad, Minnesota, U.S.
- Died: June 2, 2017 (aged 89)
Medal record
Men's ice hockey
Representing United States
Olympic Games
Silver medal – second place	1956 Cortina d'Ampezzo	Ice hockey

Gordon Eugene "Gordy" Christian (November 21, 1927 – June 2, 2017) was an American ice hockey player. He played with the University of North Dakota from 1947 to 1950, tying for scoring leader on the team in both the 1947–48 and 1948–49 seasons. He was a member of United States national team that won the silver medal at thr 1956 Winter Olympics.

== Personal life ==
Born in Warroad, Minnesota, Christian comes from a hockey playing family. His brothers Bill Christian and Roger Christian were on the U.S. Olympic Hockey Team that won its first-ever gold medal at the 1960 Winter Olympics, and his nephew Dave Christian was on the U.S. Olympic Team that won its second gold at the 1980 Winter Olympics. Christian's grandnephew Brock Nelson similarly was on the U.S. Olympic Team that won its third gold at the 2026 Winter Olympics.

== See also ==
- List of Olympic medalist families
