= 1996 Allan Cup =

Canadian senior ice hockey championship

The Allan Cup trophy

The 1996 Allan Cup was the Canadian senior ice hockey championship for the 1995–96 senior "AAA" season. The event was hosted by the Unity Miners in Unity, Saskatchewan. The 1996 tournament marked the 88th time that the Allan Cup has been awarded.

The Warroad Lakers wrapped up their third of three consecutive Allan Cup titles in 1996, this would mark the seventh and last time and American club would win the Canadian Senior "AAA" title.

== Teams ==
- Stony Plain Eagles (Pacific)
- Truro Bearcats (East)
- Unity Miners (Host)
- Warroad Lakers (West)

== Results ==
Round Robin

Warroad Lakers 6 - Stony Plain Eagles 2
Unity Miners 4 - Truro Bearcats 1
Warroad Lakers 11 - Truro Bearcats 3
Unity Miners 5 - Stony Plain Eagles 4
Stony Plain Eagles 4 - Truro Bearcats 4
Warroad Lakers 4 - Unity Miners 2

Semi-final

Stony Plain Eagles 4 - Unity Miners 1

Final

Warroad Lakers 6 - Stony Plain Eagles 1
