= 2006 Allan Cup =

Canadian senior ice hockey championship

The Allan Cup trophy

The 2006 Allan Cup was the Canadian senior ice hockey championship for the 2005–06 senior "AAA" season. The event was hosted by the Powell River Regals in Powell River, British Columbia. The 2006 tournament marked the 98th year that the Allan Cup has been awarded.

== Teams ==
- Fort Hotel Chiefs (Pacific)
- Powell River Regals (Host)
- Shawinigan Xtreme (Quebec)
- Trail Smoke Eaters (Wild Card)
- Weyburn Devils (West)
- Whitby Dunlops (Ontario)

== Results ==
Round Robin

Trail Smoke Eaters 4 - Weyburn Devils 2
Powell River Regals 4 - Fort Hotel Chiefs 2
Weyburn Devils 5 - Whitby Dunlops 4
Shawinigan Xtreme 8 - Fort Hotel Chiefs 2
Whitby Dunlops 9 - Trail Smoke Eaters 5
Powell River Regals 2 - Shawinigan Xtreme 1 (OT)

Quarter-final

Fort Hotel Chiefs 5 - Weyburn Devils 2
Trail Smoke Eaters 3 - Shawinigan Xtreme 2

Semi-final

Whitby Dunlops 4 - Fort Hotel Chiefs 0
Powell River Regals 7 - Trail Smoke Eaters 1

Final

Powell River Regals 7 - Whitby Dunlops 1
