= Warroad High School =

Location
- 510 Cedar Avenue; Warroad, Minnesota 56763; United States
- Coordinates: 48.9111°N 95.3298°W

Information
- Type: Public high school
- Motto: A Continuing tradition of Academic, Athletic, and Arts Excellence!
- School district: Warroad Public School District
- NCES District ID: 2741850
- NCES School ID: 274185001745
- Teaching staff: 30.02 (FTE)
- Grades: 7–12
- Enrollment: 567 (2023-2024)
- Student to teacher ratio: 18.89
- Campus type: Rural: Remote
- Colors: Black and gold
- Athletics conference: Mariucci (hockey)
- Team name: Warriors
- Website: www.warroad.k12.mn.us

Warroad High School is a public high school in Warroad, Minnesota, United States. Despite the small size of the community, the school has produced several successful hockey players.

== Academics ==
21% of Warroad students participate in the school's Advanced Placement (AP) program and have a 63% pass rate. The school has a 63% AP exam pass rate.

== Athletics ==
The Warroad Warriors are a part of the Northwest Conference of the Minnesota State High School League for most sports. For football they are a member of the Heart O'Lakes - Classic Conference. The following varsity sports teams are sanction by Warroad High School:"

- Fall
  - Cross Country
  - Football
  - Swimming - Girls'
  - Volleyball
- Winter
  - Hockey - Boys'
  - Hockey - Girls'
  - Basketball - Boys'
  - Basketball - Girls'
- Spring
  - Golf - Boys'
  - Golf - Girls'
  - Baseball
  - Softball
  - Track and Field

=== Hockey ===
In 1956, Warroad High School wanted to increase its hockey profile and hired Ken Johannson and Bob Johnson as teachers and coaches of the boys' hockey team. They had previously been roommates for two years at the University of North Dakota, and neither knew the other was hired to run the team.

Warroad hockey teams are part of the hockey only Mariucci Conference. The Warriors boys hockey team has won the Class A state hockey tournaments in 1994, 1996, 2003, and 2005. They have also made 10 appearances at the state finals as well as 21 overall tournament appearances.

The Warriors girls hockey team won back-to-back state titles in 2010 and 2011. They have participated and placed in the Minnesota state tournament seven times since 2006.

== Activities ==
- Knowledge Bowl
- Robotics
- National Honor Society
- One-Act Play
- Speech
- Student Council
- Band
- Choir

== Demographics ==
As of the 2011–2012 school year, Warroad was 82% white, 9% American Indian, 8% Asian, 1% Hispanic, 0% Black, 0% Hawaiian/Pacific Islanders, and .2% two or more races. 21% of students were eligible for the Free Lunch Program and 8% were eligible for the Reduced-Price Lunch Program.

== Notable alumni ==
- Robert Baril — stand-up comedian
- Roger Christian — 1960 U.S. Olympic hockey team gold medalist, 1964 U.S. Olympic hockey team
- Bill Christian (Class of 1956) — 1960 U.S. Olympic hockey team gold medalist
- Henry Boucha (Class of 1969) — 1972 U.S. Olympic hockey team silver medalist, NHL player
- Alan Hangsleben (Class of 1971) — US National hockey team, NHL player
- Dave Christian (Class of 1977) — 1980 U.S. Olympic hockey team gold medalist, NHL player
- Gigi Marvin (Class of 2005) — U.S. Olympic hockey team 2010 silver medalist, 2014 silver medalist, 2018 gold medalist
- T. J. Oshie (Class of 2005) (transferred sophomore year) — 2014 U.S. Olympic hockey team, NHL player
- Brock Nelson (Class of 2009) — 2026 U.S. Olympic hockey team gold medalist, NHL player
- Hampton Slukynsky (Class of 2023), college ice hockey goaltender for Western Michigan University
