= 1997 Allan Cup =

Canadian senior ice hockey championship

The Allan Cup trophy

The 1997 Allan Cup was the Canadian senior ice hockey championship for the 1996–97 senior "AAA" season. The event was hosted by the Powell River Regals in Powell River, British Columbia. The 1997 tournament marked the 89th time that the Allan Cup has been awarded.

== Teams ==
- Powell River Regals (Host)
- Stony Plain Eagles (Pacific)
- Truro Bearcats (East)
- Warroad Lakers (West)

== Results ==
Round Robin

Warroad Lakers 6 - Stony Plain Eagles 5
Powell River Regals 5 - Truro Bearcats 2
Truro Bearcats 8 - Stony Plain Eagles 3
Powell River Regals 4 - Warroad Lakers 1
Truro Bearcats 4 - Warroad Lakers 3
Stony Plain Eagles 3 - Powell River Regals 3

Semi-final

Warroad Lakers 3 - Truro Bearcats 0

Final

Powell River Regals 7 - Warroad Lakers 3
