= T. J. Oshie =

American ice hockey player (born 1986)

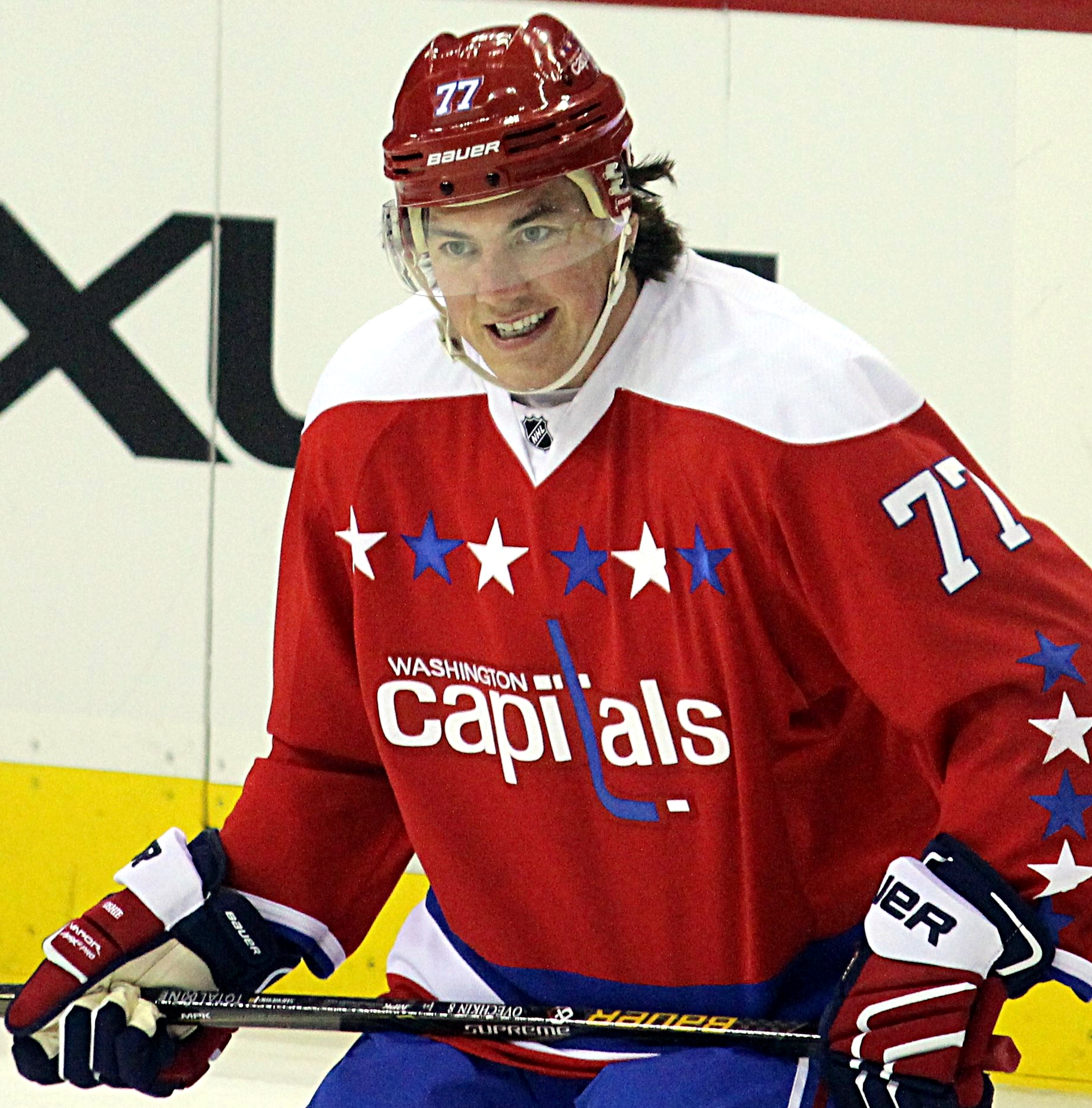
- Oshie with the Washington Capitals in 2016
- Born: December 23, 1986 (age 39) Mount Vernon, Washington, U.S.
- Height: 5 ft 11 in (180 cm)
- Weight: 196 lb (89 kg; 14 st 0 lb)
- Position: Right wing
- Shot: Right
- Played for: St. Louis Blues; Washington Capitals
- National team: United States
- NHL draft: 24th overall, 2005; St. Louis Blues
- Playing career: 2008–2024

Timothy Leif "T. J." Oshie (Note: Oshie has given differing explanations for his nickname. In a 2009 interview, Oshie claims that his mother nicknamed him "T. J.", after she saw the film The Champ, because Oshie reminded her of the main character's son, who is named T. J. Flynn. In a 2011 interview, he stated that T. J. is an abbreviation for Timothy Junior, as Oshie's father was also named Timothy.) (born December 23, 1986) is an American former professional ice hockey right winger. He was selected by the St. Louis Blues in the first round of the 2005 NHL entry draft, as the 24th overall pick. He then spent the first seven years of his NHL career with the Blues before being traded to the Washington Capitals in 2015. Oshie won the Stanley Cup as a member of the Capitals in 2018.

Oshie was widely considered a shootout specialist in the NHL and is one of the top career leaders in goals scored and scoring percentage since the league adopted shootouts in overtime for the 2005–06 season.

== Early years ==
Born in Mount Vernon, Washington, Oshie was raised in Everett, north of Seattle, and was on ice at age five in the Seattle Junior Hockey Association, where he played for ten years. Following his parents' amicable divorce, he lived in Stanwood with his mother Tina and attended Stanwood High School for his freshman year. In 2002, Oshie moved to Warroad, Minnesota, where his parents were originally from, and lived with his father, Tim, and his father's cousin.

He attended Warroad High School, where he was a star player on the hockey team for three seasons, leading the club to two Minnesota State Class A titles in 2003 and 2005. He made the state's All-Tournament Team all three years. With 100 points (37 goals and 63 assists) in 31 games as a senior, he led all Minnesota high school players in scoring, subsequently being named to the 2005 Associated Press and Pioneer Press All-State First Team and finishing as a Minnesota Mr. Hockey Finalist.

At the completion of his senior season with the Warriors in the 2004–05 season, he attended the University of North Dakota, where he played college ice hockey for the Fighting Sioux.

== Playing career ==
=== Amateur ===
Oshie started his career in the greater Seattle area, playing for the Seattle Junior Hockey Association. He then moved to Warroad, Minnesota when he was in bantam. Following his draft, Oshie played for the University of North Dakota men's ice hockey team in the Western Collegiate Hockey Association (WCHA) for three seasons. Scoring a team-leading 24 goals as a freshman, he added 21 assists for 45 points total. He also set a school record with nine game-winning goals in the season, which also led all NCAA players. At the end of his debut season, he was named to the WCHA All-Rookie Team and the WCHA Final Five All-Tournament Team.

In his sophomore year, Oshie improved to 52 points (17 goals and 35 assists), ranking second in team scoring. He earned Third Team All-WCHA and received the Fighting Sioux's Cliff "Fido" Purpur Award, given to the player who demonstrates hard work and determination while generating excitement on the ice. Following North Dakota's WCHA playoff run, Oshie led all players with eight points (four goals and four assists) in the 2006 NCAA Tournament, earning NCAA West All-Tournament honors. He played his last season with North Dakota as a junior, recording 45 points in 42 games.

=== St. Louis Blues (2008–2015) ===
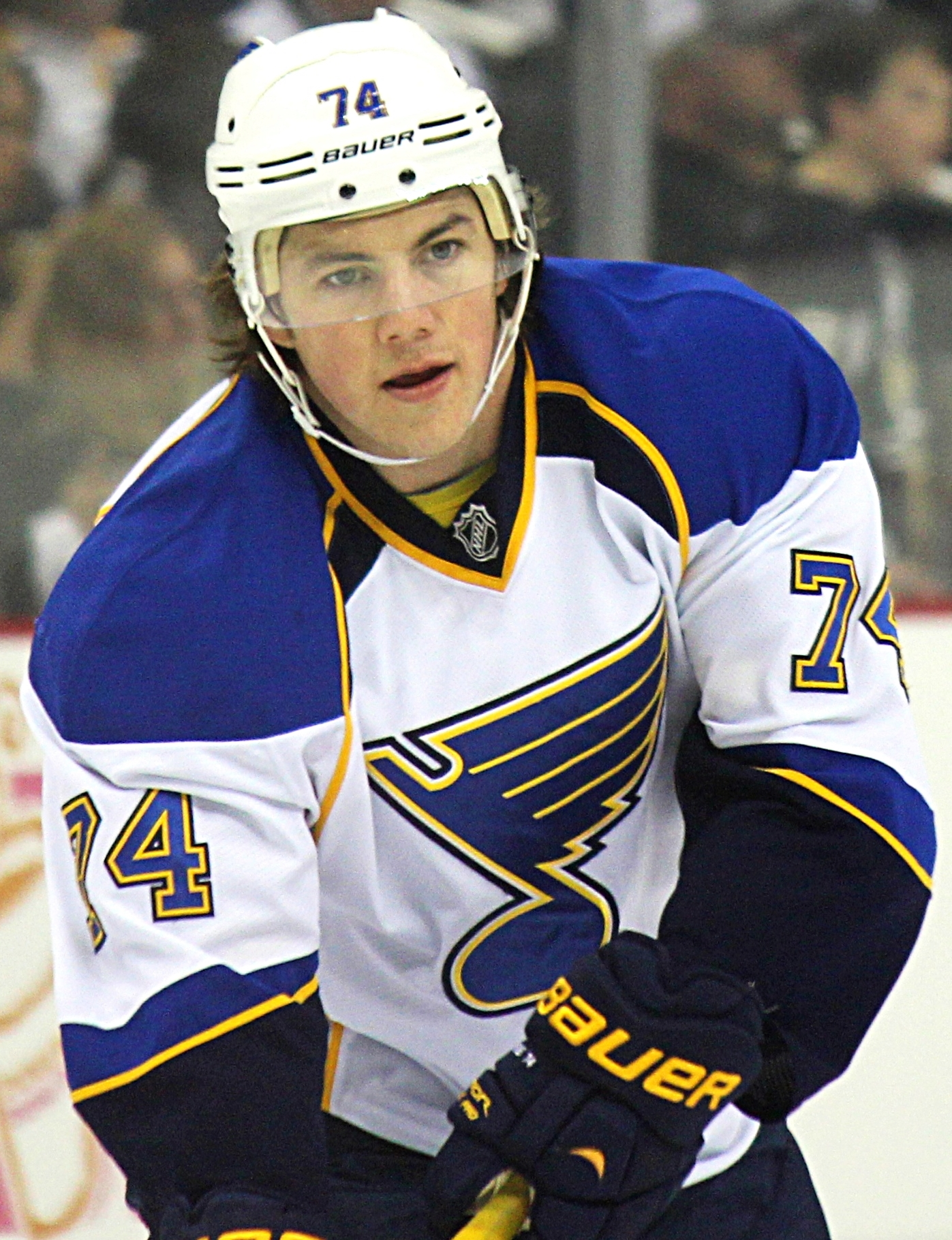
Oshie playing with St. Louis in March 2014.

On May 13, 2008, Oshie opted to forgo his senior season at North Dakota and signed with the St. Louis Blues. He scored his first career NHL goal on October 22, 2008, against the Detroit Red Wings. Oshie quickly became a fan favorite due to his fast and energetic style of play. Playing in 57 games, he scored 14 goals and 25 assists for 39 points during his rookie year. At the end of the season, he won the NHL's 2008–09 "Goal of the Year" honors, a fan-voted contest on the NHL's website.

Oshie broke his ankle in a fight with Samuel Påhlsson during a blowout loss against the Columbus Blue Jackets early in the 2010–11 season on November 10, 2010, missing three months due to the injury.

In the 2013–14 season, Oshie had 21 goals and 39 assists for a career-high 60 points.

=== Washington Capitals and retirement (2015–2025) ===
On July 2, 2015, Oshie was traded by the Blues to the Washington Capitals in exchange for Troy Brouwer, Pheonix Copley and a third-round draft pick in 2016. Oshie wore number 77 for the Capitals, as his previous number 74 was then worn by Capitals defenseman John Carlson. Oshie had a successful first season with the Capitals, often finding himself playing on the Capitals' top line with Alexander Ovechkin and Nicklas Bäckström. Oshie finished the 2015–16 season with a career high 26 goals along with 25 assists for 51 points in 80 games, helping the team win their second Presidents' Trophy. During game one of the Capitals' second round series in the 2016 playoffs against the Pittsburgh Penguins, Oshie scored a hat trick, the third goal of which came in overtime, giving the Capitals a 4–3 win. Despite this, the Capitals would lose the series in six games.

In the 2016–17 season, Oshie would further extend his career-high in goals to 33 along with 23 assists for 56 points in 68 games en route to a second consecutive President's Trophy and third altogether for the Capitals but also another second-round playoff loss to the Penguins.

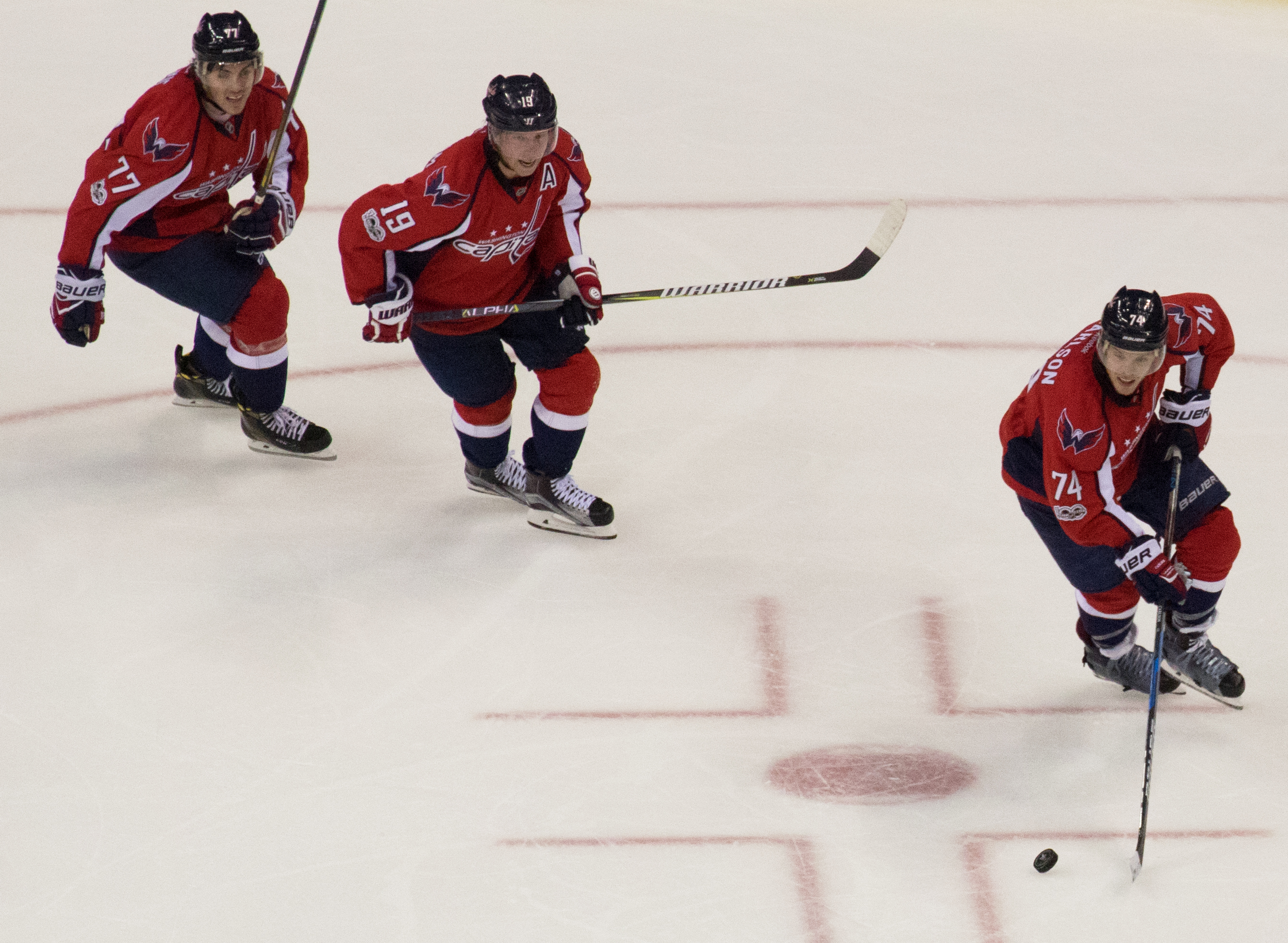
Oshie (left) with Nicklas Bäckström and John Carlson in April 2017

On June 23, 2017, Oshie signed an eight-year, $46 million contract with an annual average of $5.75 million to remain with the Capitals. Oshie saw his production drop to 18 goals, 29 assists and 47 points in 72 games in 2017–18 season but the Capitals as a team remained dominant as they would finish the season as the second seed in the Eastern Conference and once the 2018 playoffs began, Oshie would play a crucial role in the Capitals Stanley Cup victory, scoring 8 goals (including 6 on the powerplay) and 21 points in all 24 playoff games. On June 7, 2018, the Capitals defeated the first-year expansion Vegas Golden Knights in game five of the 2018 Stanley Cup Final for their first Stanley Cup in franchise history. He is one of only 43 players to ever have 6 or more power play goals in a single playoffs.

In a November 7, 2018, game against the Pittsburgh Penguins, Oshie was injured twice on the ice and came back to score the winning goal with 1:14 minutes left in the game. Oshie was sent to the training room twice, the first time requiring two stitches to a cut near his left eye created by an opponent's stick. He then took a shoulder check to the head from Evgeni Malkin. On November 14, in a 3–1 loss to the Winnipeg Jets, Oshie suffered a possible concussion when he was slammed down by the Jets' defenseman Josh Morrissey, who was later fined for unsportsmanlike conduct. Oshie has four reported concussions in his NHL career. After missing 11 games, he returned for a home game against the Detroit Red Wings on December 11, scoring a goal in the 6-2 Caps win. On April 18, 2019, during game four of the first round series between the Capitals and the Carolina Hurricanes in the 2019 playoffs, Oshie was severely injured after being cross-checked into the boards by Hurricanes forward Warren Foegele. Later tests revealed the injury to be a broken collarbone, and Oshie was ruled out indefinitely. Oshie ultimately missed the remainder of the series, which the Capitals lost in 7 games.

On January 11, 2020, Oshie was voted into the 2020 National Hockey League All-Star Game – hosted in St. Louis, home of his former team – along with Mitch Marner, Quinn Hughes and David Perron. That season, he led all Eastern Conference players with a 20.8% shooting percentage and 13 power play goals.

On March 16, 2024, Oshie played his 1,000th NHL game against the Vancouver Canucks. During the 2023–24 season, Oshie suffered multiple injuries that kept him out of the lineup for extended periods of time leading up to his 1,000th game, including an upper body injury that potentially could have made him miss the milestone by one game.

After having missed the entire 2024–25 season due to the lingering effects of his prior season's injuries, Oshie announced his retirement from hockey on June 9, 2025.

== International play ==
Medal record

Men's ice hockey

Representing the United States

World Championships
Bronze medal – third place	2013 Sweden/Finland	

Oshie represented the United States at the 2006 World Junior Championships in Vancouver. Following the Blues' elimination in the 2009 Stanley Cup playoffs, he received his first senior national team callup for the 2009 IIHF World Championship, also competing in the 2010 Championship, scoring four goals and two assists in six games. In 2012, he was the last addition of the American roster after the Blues were eliminated in the second round of the 2012 playoffs.

On January 1, 2014, Oshie was named to the American roster for the 2014 Winter Olympics, along with Blues teammates David Backes and Kevin Shattenkirk. Oshie was a player on the "bubble," as he was one of several American-born players being considered for one of Team USA's final roster spots. Oshie was eventually chosen in large part due to his high success rate in shootouts. On February 15, in a preliminary-round game against Russia, Oshie was repeatedly selected by Team USA Head Coach Dan Bylsma to participate in a shootout that ultimately resulted in a 3–2 American victory. Oshie was the first of three shooters to face goaltender Sergei Bobrovsky in the shootout, followed by teammates James van Riemsdyk and Joe Pavelski. After the score remained tied after the first three rounds, international rules stipulated that coaches could re-use players as often as desired. Oshie was subsequently tabbed by Bylsma five consecutive times, ultimately converting four of six shot attempts, including the shootout-winner in the eighth round.

== Player profile ==
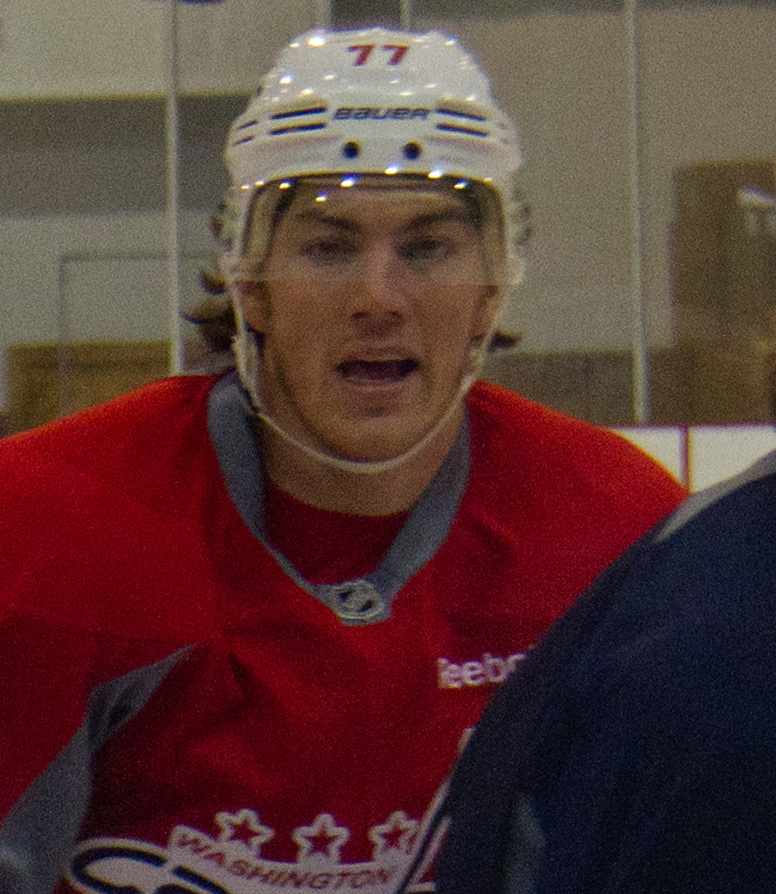
Oshie practicing with the Capitals in October 2015

Barry Trotz, former coach of the Washington Capitals from 2014–2018, described Oshie during the Capitals Stanley Cup run in 2018, "Osh is a hockey player. Obviously, he brings energy and he does all of those things, but in simplest terms, he loves playing. He enjoys being around the guys all of the time. He enjoys the battles, he enjoys the competition, and he does it with a smile on his face, you know?"

Oshie himself hoped that his approach to ice hockey inspires others: "I think you've just got to enjoy the competition in playoffs. I think it's the most fun part of our sport is when everyone's giving their best and it's you versus another guy. Sometimes, it's not always the skill. It's just the will to win a battle, and I don't know, for some reason, that gets me going. That gets me excited. When I play that way, I hope it can be somewhat of an inspiration to some of the younger guys or just even the other guys that are able to see it."

== Personal life ==
Oshie has three siblings, a brother Taylor and two sisters, Tawni and Aleah Oshie. He attended the University of North Dakota in Grand Forks for three years, majoring in general studies. His first cousin, Gary Sargent, and second cousin, Henry Boucha, played in the NHL.

Oshie is from the Anishinaabe or Ojibwe Nation; his name in Anishinaabemowin, or the Ojibwe language, "Keeway Gaaboo" means "coming home." Giiwe translates roughly as "s/he returns home." If the -aaboo in Gaaboo refers to water, then this name may evoke the poetic image of water that, by traveling downhill, will inevitably find its way home to a larger body of water, such as the Great Lakes or the sea. His father was Anishnaabe.

In January 2007, Oshie and former North Dakota teammate Jonathan Toews received alcohol-related citations for being minors in a Grand Forks, North Dakota, tavern. Oshie and Toews pleaded guilty to the charges. The two were later placed on probation and ordered to perform community service.

Oshie and his wife, Lauren Cosgrove Oshie, have three daughters and one son. In 2025, after retiring from the NHL and selling his home in McLean, Virginia, Oshie and his family moved back to the Midwest and now live in Edina, Minnesota. Their first-born daughter had been born with gastroschisis, for which she required surgery.

Oshie's father, Tim, suffered from Early-onset Alzheimer's disease. After Oshie's 2018 Stanley Cup win, he remarked "My dad's here in the crowd... he was diagnosed with Alzheimer's and he doesn't remember a lot of stuff. But...you bet your ass he's going to remember this one." Oshie later said that his father remembered the win the next day. Tim died on May 4, 2021, at the age of 56.

Oshie attracted controversy when he tweeted his support for President Donald Trump on the day of his second inauguration. He responded to the backlash by saying he loves "Americans on both sides of the aisle and always will."

== Career statistics ==
=== Regular season and playoffs ===
			Regular season					Playoffs
Season	Team	League	GP	G	A	Pts	PIM	GP	G	A	Pts	PIM
2003–04	Warroad High School	HS-MN	31	43	42	85	12	—	—	—	—	—
2004–05	Warroad High School	HS-MN	31	38	62	100	22	—	—	—	—	—
2004–05	Sioux Falls Stampede	USHL	11	3	2	5	6	—	—	—	—	—
2005–06	University of North Dakota	WCHA	43	24	21	45	33	—	—	—	—	—
2006–07	University of North Dakota	WCHA	43	17	35	52	30	—	—	—	—	—
2007–08	University of North Dakota	WCHA	42	18	27	45	57	—	—	—	—	—
2008–09	St. Louis Blues	NHL	57	14	25	39	30	4	0	0	0	2
2009–10	St. Louis Blues	NHL	76	18	30	48	36	—	—	—	—	—
2010–11	St. Louis Blues	NHL	49	12	22	34	15	—	—	—	—	—
2011–12	St. Louis Blues	NHL	80	19	35	54	50	9	0	3	3	6
2012–13	St. Louis Blues	NHL	30	7	13	20	15	6	2	0	2	2
2013–14	St. Louis Blues	NHL	79	21	39	60	42	5	2	0	2	2
2014–15	St. Louis Blues	NHL	72	19	36	55	51	6	1	1	2	0
2015–16	Washington Capitals	NHL	80	26	25	51	34	12	6	4	10	11
2016–17	Washington Capitals	NHL	68	33	23	56	36	13	4	8	12	4
2017–18	Washington Capitals	NHL	74	18	29	47	31	24	8	13	21	31
2018–19	Washington Capitals	NHL	69	25	29	54	36	4	1	1	2	4
2019–20	Washington Capitals	NHL	69	26	23	49	26	8	3	0	3	13
2020–21	Washington Capitals	NHL	53	22	21	43	18	5	1	3	4	0
2021–22	Washington Capitals	NHL	44	11	14	25	18	6	6	1	7	0
2022–23	Washington Capitals	NHL	58	19	16	35	59	—	—	—	—	—
2023–24	Washington Capitals	NHL	52	12	13	25	44	4	0	1	1	4
NHL totals			1,010	302	393	695	541	106	34	35	69	79

=== International ===
Year	Team	Event	GP	G	A	Pts	PIM
2006	United States	WJC	7	1	0	1	10
2009	United States	WC	9	1	2	3	2
2010	United States	WC	6	4	2	6	2
2013	United States	WC	4	1	0	1	2
2014	United States	OLY	3	1	3	4	2
2016	United States	WCH	3	1	0	1	0
Junior totals			7	1	0	1	10
Senior totals			25	8	7	15	8

== Awards and honors ==
Award	Year
College
All-WCHA Rookie Team	2005–06
WCHA All-Tournament Team	2006, 2008
All-WCHA Third Team	2006–07
All-WCHA First Team	2007–08
AHCA West First-Team All-American	2007–08
NHL
Stanley Cup champion	2018
All-Star Game	2020

== Notes ==
Awards and achievements
Preceded by Marek Schwarz	St. Louis Blues first-round draft pick 2005	Succeeded by Erik Johnson
