= Clarence Schmidt (ice hockey) =

American ice hockey player

- Born: September 17, 1925 Williams, Minnesota, USA
- Died: November 2, 1997 (aged 72)
- Height: 5 ft 11 in (180 cm)
- Weight: 165 lb (75 kg; 11 st 11 lb)
- Position: Right wing
- Shot: Right
- Played for: Boston Bruins
- Playing career: 1942–1945

Clarence Elmer Schmidt (September 17, 1925 – November 2, 1997) was an American professional ice hockey player who played seven games in the National Hockey League during the 1943–44 season. He played for the Boston Bruins. He had one goal and no assists with the Bruins. His lone goal came on February 5, 1944, in his team's 7–2 win over the New York Rangers at Boston Garden.

== Career statistics ==
=== Regular season and playoffs ===
			Regular season					Playoffs
Season	Team	League	GP	G	A	Pts	PIM	GP	G	A	Pts	PIM
1942–43	Boston Olympics	EAHL	36	25	12	37	22	9	4	1	5	5
1943–44	Boston Bruins	NHL	7	1	0	1	0	—	—	—	—	—
1943–44	Boston Olympics	EAHL	13	7	6	13	14	8	6	3	9	5
1944–45	Warroad Lakers	MHL Sr	—	—	—	—	—	—	—	—	—	—
EAHL totals			49	32	18	50	36	17	10	4	14	10
NHL totals			7	1	0	1	2	—	—	—	—	—

== Bibliography ==
- Clarence Schmidt Game Logs 1943–44, National Hockey League, 2020
