= Warroad International Memorial Airport =

Airport in Minnesota, United States

Warroad International Memorial Airport Swede Carlson Field
- IATA: RRT; ICAO: KRRT; FAA LID: RRT

Summary
- Airport type: Public
- Owner: City of Warroad
- Serves: Warroad, Minnesota
- Elevation AMSL: 1,076 ft (328 m)
- Coordinates: 48°56′29″N 095°20′54″W

Map
- Location of airport in Minnesota / United States RRT (the United States)

Runways
Direction	Length		Surface
Direction	ft	m	Surface
13/31	5,400	1,646	Asphalt
4/22	2,987	910	Turf

Statistics (2019)
- Aircraft operations (year ending 7/31/2019): 9,000
- Based aircraft: 19
- Sources: FAA, Minnesota DOT.

Warroad International Memorial Airport (IATA: RRT, ICAO: KRRT, FAA LID: RRT), also known as Swede Carlson Field, is a public use airport in Roseau County, Minnesota, United States. It is owned by the City of Warroad and located two nautical miles (4 km) northwest of its central business district. This airport is included in the National Plan of Integrated Airport Systems for 2017–2021, which categorized it as a general aviation facility.

== Facilities and aircraft ==
Warroad International Memorial Airport covers an area of 320 acres (129 ha) at an elevation of 1,076 feet (328 m) above mean sea level. It has two runways: 13/31 is 5,400 by 100 feet (1,646 x 30 m) with an asphalt surface and 4/22 is 2,987 by 150 feet (910 x 46 m) with a turf surface.

For the 12-month period ending July 31, 2019, the airport had 9,000 general aviation aircraft operations, an average of 25 per day. In July 2019, there were 19 aircraft based at this airport: 14 single-engine, 4 multi-engine and 1 jet.

Airport services include a US Customs office.

== See also ==
- List of airports in Minnesota
