= 2000 Allan Cup =

Canadian senior ice hockey championship

The Allan Cup trophy

The 2000 Allan Cup was the Canadian senior ice hockey championship for the 1999–2000 senior "AAA" season. The event was hosted by the Lloydminster Border Kings in Lloydminster, Saskatchewan/Alberta. The 2000 tournament marked the 92nd year that the Allan Cup has been awarded.

== Teams ==
- Lloydminster Border Kings (Host)
- Powell River Regals (Pacific)
- Regina Rangers (West)
- St-Georges Garaga (East)

== Results ==
Round Robin

Powell River Regals 10 - Regina Rangers 2
Lloydminster Border Kings 6 - St-Georges Garaga 3
St-Georges Garaga 6 - Powell River Regals 2
Lloydminster Border Kings 4 - Regina Rangers 4
St-Georges Garaga 5 - Regina Rangers 1
Lloydminster Border Kings 8 - Powell River Regals 2

Semi-final

Powell River Regals 5 - St-Georges Garaga 3

Final

Powell River Regals 4 - Lloydminster Border Kings 1
