= Alan Hangsleben =

American ice hockey player (born 1953)

- Born: July 30, 1953 (age 72) Warroad, Minnesota, U.S.
- Height: 6 ft 1 in (185 cm)
- Weight: 195 lb (88 kg; 13 st 13 lb)
- Position: Defense
- Shot: Left
- Played for: New England Whalers; Hartford Whalers; Washington Capitals; Los Angeles Kings
- National team: United States
- NHL draft: 56th overall, 1973; Montreal Canadiens
- WHA draft: 51st overall, 1973; New England Whalers
- Playing career: 1973–1984

Alan William Hangsleben (born February 22, 1953) is an American former professional ice hockey defenseman from Warroad, Minnesota. He played for the New England Whalers of the World Hockey Association between 1974 and 1979, and then in the National Hockey League with the Hartford Whalers, Washington Capitals, and Los Angeles Kings between 1979 and 1982. Internationally, Hangsleben played for the American national team at three World Championships and the 1976 Canada Cup.

== Playing career ==
Selected in 1973 by both the Montreal Canadiens of the National Hockey League and the New England Whalers of the World Hockey Association while still playing for the University of North Dakota men's ice hockey team, Hangsleben chose to sign a pro contract with the Whalers. Hangsleben made a total of 334 WHA game appearances for the Whalers from 1975 to 1979. The Canadiens, who still retained their NHL rights, left him exposed for the 1979 NHL Expansion Draft, and he was claimed by the Hartford Whalers when they were admitted into the NHL in 1979.

Hangsleben was traded to the Washington Capitals during the middle of the 1979–80 NHL season in exchange for Tom Rowe, and played for the Capitals until he was released early into the 1981–82 NHL season. Hangsleben would sign with the Los Angeles Kings and play for them for the rest of that season. He played two seasons in the American Hockey League before retiring in 1984.

== International play ==
Hangsleben played for Team USA at the 1973,1974, and 1981 Ice Hockey World Championship tournaments. He was also a member of the U.S. team at the inaugural 1976 Canada Cup tournament.

== Career statistics ==
=== Regular season and playoffs ===
			Regular season					Playoffs
Season	Team	League	GP	G	A	Pts	PIM	GP	G	A	Pts	PIM
1968–69	Warroad High School	HS-MN	—	—	—	—	—	—	—	—	—	—
1969–70	Warroad High School	HS-MN	—	—	—	—	—	—	—	—	—	—
1970–71	Warroad High School	HS-MN	—	—	—	—	—	—	—	—	—	—
1971–72	University of North Dakota	WCHA	36	13	21	34	49	—	—	—	—	—
1972–73	University of North Dakota	WCHA	36	15	18	33	77	—	—	—	—	—
1973–74	University of North Dakota	WCHA	34	9	16	25	56	—	—	—	—	—
1974–75	New England Whalers	WHA	26	0	4	4	8	6	0	3	3	19
1974–75	Cape Codders	NAHL	55	4	39	43	130	—	—	—	—	—
1975–76	New England Whalers	WHA	78	2	23	25	62	13	2	3	5	20
1975–76	Cape Codders	NAHL	1	0	0	0	9	—	—	—	—	—
1976–77	New England Whalers	WHA	74	13	9	22	79	4	0	0	0	9
1977–78	New England Whalers	WHA	79	11	18	29	140	14	1	4	5	37
1978–79	New England Whalers	WHA	77	10	19	29	148	10	1	2	3	12
1979–80	Hartford Whalers	NHL	37	3	15	18	69	—	—	—	—	—
1979–80	Washington Capitals	NHL	37	10	7	17	45	—	—	—	—	—
1980–81	Washington Capitals	NHL	76	5	19	24	198	—	—	—	—	—
1981–82	Washington Capitals	NHL	17	1	1	2	19	—	—	—	—	—
1981–82	Los Angeles Kings	NHL	18	2	6	8	65	—	—	—	—	—
1981–82	Hershey Bears	AHL	6	1	2	3	26	—	—	—	—	—
1981–82	New Haven Nighthawks	AHL	18	5	4	9	28	4	0	0	0	4
1982–83	Moncton Alpines	AHL	71	10	16	26	127	—	—	—	—	—
1983–84	New Haven Nighthawks	AHL	58	1	23	24	88	—	—	—	—	—
WHA totals			334	36	73	109	437	47	4	12	16	97
NHL totals			185	21	48	69	396	—	—	—	—	—

=== International ===
Year	Team	Event	GP	G	A	Pts	PIM
1973	United States	WC-B	7	2	4	6	—
1974	United States	WC-B	7	2	3	5	10
1976	United States	CC	5	1	1	2	12
1981	United States	WC	8	1	3	4	2
Senior totals			27	6	11	17	24

== Awards and honors ==
Award	Year
All-WCHA First Team	1971–72
AHCA West All-American	1971–72

Awards and achievements
Preceded by Mike Usitalo	WCHA Freshman of the Year; 1971–72	Succeeded by Mike Zuke
