= Bill Christian =

American ice hockey player

Personal information
- Full name: William David Christian
- Born: January 29, 1938 (age 88) Warroad, Minnesota, U.S.
Medal record
Men's ice hockey
Representing the United States
Olympic Games
Gold medal – first place	1960 Squaw Valley	Ice hockey

William David Christian (born January 29, 1938) is an American former ice hockey player. As a member of the United States hockey team, he won the gold medal at the 1960 Winter Olympics. He was inducted into the United States Hockey Hall of Fame in 1984, and the International Ice Hockey Federation Hall of Fame in 1998.

== Career ==
Christian played prep school hockey at Warroad High School where he led the team to the 1953 state tournament finals. Christian then attended the University of Minnesota. However, since freshman were not allowed to join varsity sports teams at the time, Christian describes it as a "lost season." After one year at the University of Minnesota, Christian joined the United States national team, which went on to win its first-ever ice hockey gold medal at the 1960 Winter Olympics. During the Olympics, Christian led the team with seven goals and five assists. A year earlier, they became the first American team to play exhibition games in Russia against the Soviet Union national ice hockey team. After the Olympics, Christian had a brief tryout with the minor league Seattle Totems but chose not to become a professional player, returning to build houses in Minnesota instead. He kept playing for the Warroad Lakers for 23 years before retiring after the 1980 season. Four years later, in 1984, he was inducted into the United States Hockey Hall of Fame. In 1998, Christian was inducted into the International Ice Hockey Federation Hall of Fame as a player.

== Personal life ==
Christian comes from a hockey-playing family. Both Roger (1960 and 1964 Winter Olympics) and Gordon Christian (1956 Winter Olympics) played for Team USA at the Olympic Games. His son, Dave Christian, was a member of the U.S. Olympic Hockey Team at the 1980 Winter Olympics and played in the National Hockey League (NHL). His grandson, Brock Nelson, is also an NHL player. Nelson played for the United States at the 2026 Winter Olympics, winning the family's third Olympic ice hockey gold medal.

The Christian brothers' father was a carpenter. In 1964, Christian and his brother Roger began a wooden hockey stick business called "Christian Brothers Hockey Company". The company was eventually bought out by Harrow in 2009. In 2016, both Christian and his son Dave auctioned off their gold medals.

== See also ==
- List of Olympic medalist families
