= Henry Boucha =

Native American ice hockey player (1951–2023)

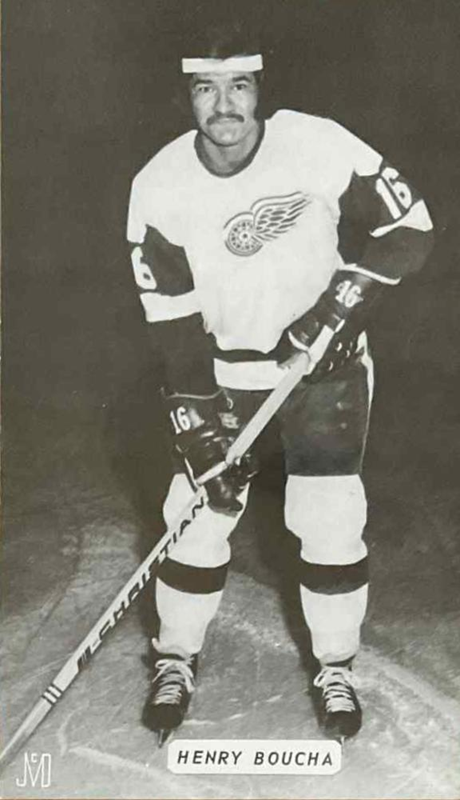
- Boucha in 1970s postcard for Detroit Red Wings
- Born: June 1, 1951 Warroad, Minnesota, U.S.
- Died: September 18, 2023 (aged 72) Warroad, Minnesota, U.S.
- Height: 6 ft 0 in (183 cm)
- Weight: 195 lb (88 kg; 13 st 13 lb)
- Position: Center
- Shot: Right
- Played for: Detroit Red Wings; Minnesota North Stars; Minnesota Fighting Saints; Kansas City Scouts; Colorado Rockies
- National team: United States
- NHL draft: 16th overall, 1971; Detroit Red Wings
- Playing career: 1971–1977
- Website: henryboucha.com

Henry Charles Boucha (/ˈbuːʃeɪ/ BOO-shay; June 1, 1951 – September 18, 2023) was a Native American professional ice hockey player. Boucha played in both the National Hockey League (NHL) and World Hockey Association (WHA) between 1971 and 1977. In the NHL he played for the Detroit Red Wings, Minnesota North Stars, Kansas City Scouts, and Colorado Rockies, while in the WHA he played for the Minnesota Fighting Saints. His career was cut short by an eye injury by Dave Forbes. Internationally Boucha played for the American national team at two World Championships and at the 1972 Winter Olympics, where he won a silver medal.

A full-blooded Ojibwe, Boucha's distant cousin Gary Sargent and his second cousin T. J. Oshie have also played in the NHL.

== Amateur career ==
Boucha played high school hockey for Warroad High School in Warroad, Minnesota, leading his team to the 1969 state tournament where he was injured during a 5–4 overtime loss to Edina. He is considered one of the best players to ever play Minnesota high school hockey.

While serving in the U.S. Army, Boucha joined the United States national ice hockey team on a full-time basis in 1970 as the U.S. won the "Pool B" qualification tournament. He participated in the 1971 Ice Hockey World Championships in Bern, Switzerland where he scored seven goals in ten games for Team USA. Boucha was also one of the biggest stars of the 1972 United States Olympic hockey team which received the silver medal.

== Professional career ==
Boucha was drafted in the second round, 16th overall by the Detroit Red Wings in the 1971 NHL entry draft (he was also drafted first overall by the Minnesota Fighting Saints of the rival WHA but chose not to defect to the WHA). Boucha scored a goal in his first NHL game after the Olympics and was voted Detroit rookie of the year in his first full NHL season. The Red Wings sent him to the Minnesota North Stars in exchange for Danny Grant in 1974. Boucha was enjoying a solid year in his home state; on January 4, 1975, he was assaulted in a highly publicized stick incident by Dave Forbes of the Boston Bruins. The attack left Boucha with a cracked bone around his eye and blurred vision. Forbes was prosecuted for aggravated assault. His trial resulted in a hung jury.

Boucha never really recovered from the injury. He attempted a comeback with the Minnesota Fighting Saints of the WHA in 1975–76 and then returned to the NHL as a free agent with the Kansas City Scouts in later 1975-76. In 1976 the franchise moved to Denver, Colorado and became the Colorado Rockies, from whom he retired from professional hockey after only nine games.

Before the NHL required players to wear a helmet, Boucha wore a headband. His nickname was "the Chief".

== Post-playing career ==
Boucha fell on hard times due to his unexpectedly early retirement from ice hockey (his agent was negotiating a four-year contract with the North Stars but the talks were never completed due to the injury). He went through a period of divorce and drug and alcohol abuse before straightening out his life in the 1980s. He re-established himself in his native community and became active in various Native American causes.

Henry Boucha died on September 18, 2023, at the age of 72.

== International play ==
Olympic medal record

Men's ice hockey

Representing United States

Olympic Games
Silver medal – second place	1972 Sapporo	Team

- Ice hockey world championships, Pool B, 1970 (first, won promotion to Pool A)
- Ice hockey world championships, Pool A, 1971 (sixth place)
- Olympic tournament, 1972 (second place)

== Career statistics ==
=== Regular season and playoffs ===
			Regular season					Playoffs
Season	Team	League	GP	G	A	Pts	PIM	GP	G	A	Pts	PIM
1965–66	Warroad High School	HS-MN	—	—	—	—	—	—	—	—	—	—
1966–67	Warroad High School	HS-MN	—	—	—	—	—	—	—	—	—	—
1967–68	Warroad High School	HS-MN	—	—	—	—	—	—	—	—	—	—
1968–69	Warroad High School	HS-MN	25	60	35	95	—	—	—	—	—	—
1969–70	Winnipeg Jets	WCHL	51	27	26	53	37	14	6	3	9	37
1971–72	Detroit Red Wings	NHL	16	1	0	1	2	—	—	—	—	—
1972–73	Detroit Red Wings	NHL	73	14	14	28	82	—	—	—	—	—
1972–73	Virginia Wings	AHL	7	3	2	5	9	—	—	—	—	—
1973–74	Detroit Red Wings	NHL	70	19	12	31	32	—	—	—	—	—
1974–75	Minnesota North Stars	NHL	51	15	14	29	23	—	—	—	—	—
1975–76	Minnesota Fighting Saints	WHA	36	15	20	35	47	—	—	—	—	—
1975–76	Kansas City Scouts	NHL	28	4	7	11	14	—	—	—	—	—
1976–77	Colorado Rockies	NHL	9	0	2	2	4	—	—	—	—	—
WHA totals			36	15	20	35	47	—	—	—	—	—
NHL totals			247	53	49	102	157	—	—	—	—	—

=== International ===
Year	Team	Event	GP	G	A	Pts	PIM
1970	United States	WC-B	7	4	1	5	4
1971	United States	WC	10	7	1	8	2
1972	United States	Oly	6	2	4	6	6
Senior totals			23	13	6	19	12

== Awards and achievements ==
- Detroit Red Wings rookie of the year – 1972–73
- Inducted into the United States Hockey Hall of Fame in 1995

== See also ==
- List of members of the United States Hockey Hall of Fame
