= Roger Christian (ice hockey) =

American ice hockey player (1935–2011)

- Born: December 1, 1935 Warroad, Minnesota, U.S.
- Died: November 9, 2011 (aged 75) Grand Forks, North Dakota, U.S.
- Height: 5 ft 9 in (175 cm)
- Weight: 150 lb (68 kg; 10 st 10 lb)
- Position: Left wing
- Shot: Left
- Played for: Huntington Hornets; Seattle Totems
- National team: United States
- Playing career: 1956–1965
Medal record
Men's ice hockey
Representing the United States
Gold medal – first place	1960 Squaw Valley	Ice hockey

Roger Allen Christian (December 1, 1935 – November 9, 2011) was an American ice hockey player. Christian played for the U.S at the 1960 and 1964 Winter Olympics, winning a gold medal in 1960. He was inducted into the United States Hockey Hall of Fame in 1989. He was also a co-founder of Christian Brother's Hockey Sticks, along with his brother Bill Christian and brother-in-law Hal Bakke.

== Early life ==
Born in Warroad, Minnesota, Christian began playing hockey at a young age. He would play on the roads, lakes, and outdoor rinks with his friends for up to five hours each day. Growing up he and his brother, Billy, would use magazines as padding. They only had one pair of skates between the two of them and would share that pair each time they would go skating. Christian also played organized hockey at Warroad High School. He began playing at Warroad in 1950 and was the leading scorer within two years. During the 1953 season, Christian led Warroad to the State Tournament. He was later selected to the All-State Team and was named All-Region twice.

== Career ==
Christian's career with the United States national team began in 1958. That year he led the team in scoring, under coach Cal Marvin and manager Don Clark. Roger played together with Billy and a third brother, Gordon, on the 1958 U.S. team. Roger then played at the 1960 Winter Olympics, alongside his brother, where the American team won its first-ever gold medal. He would go on to play on five World Championship and Olympic teams altogether.

Afterwards, Roger went on to play for nearly 20 years with his hometown Warroad Lakers, an amateur dynasty, where his number 7 jersey was later retired from the Lakers roster in 1974.

== Christian Brothers' ==
After winning gold medals in 1960, the two Christian brothers returned to their hometown of Warroad and established Christian Brothers Hockey Stick Manufacturing. The idea of this business was to produce a line of customized American hockey sticks. The slogan for this company was, "Hockey Sticks by Hockey Players." They refurbished an old building off of the highway Warroad which became the home to the first Christian Brother hockey stick plant.

In the early years of the company, they saw success and expanded into a new stick manufacturing plant in Warroad. They officially moved to this new plant in 1969 and operated there for many years. During the 1980 Winter Olympics, the business received additional attention. Roger's nephew Dave Christian led the U.S. team in assists and brought the second gold medal to Warroad. He was using a Christian Bros stick throughout the tournament. This was not only a great accomplishment for Dave but also beneficial for the family's company. After this, sales boomed to up to 40% more sticks.

Christian and his brother sold their company in 2002 because of changes in materials, multi-national competition, and increased licensing fees.

== Personal life ==
Christian and his wife, Jean, had three sons. He died on November 9, 2011, in Grand Forks, North Dakota.

== See also ==
- List of Olympic medalist families
