= Dave Christian =

American ice hockey player (born 1959)

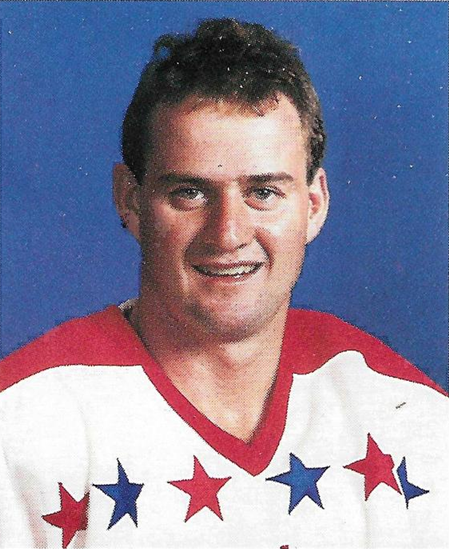
- Christian in 1986 card
- Born: May 12, 1959 (age 67) Warroad, Minnesota, U.S.
- Height: 5 ft 11 in (180 cm)
- Weight: 170 lb (77 kg; 12 st 2 lb)
- Position: Right wing
- Shot: Right
- Played for: Winnipeg Jets; Washington Capitals; Boston Bruins; St. Louis Blues; Chicago Blackhawks
- National team: United States
- NHL draft: 40th overall, 1979; Winnipeg Jets
- Playing career: 1980–1996
Medal record
Men's ice hockey
Representing the United States
Olympic Games
Gold medal – first place	1980 Lake Placid	Team competition

David William Christian (born May 12, 1959) is an American former professional ice hockey forward. He played on the 1980 U.S. Olympic hockey team that won the gold medal during the 1980 Winter Olympics. Christian went on to play for five National Hockey League teams over a 15-season career, from 1980 to 1994.

== Amateur career ==
Christian was born in Warroad, Minnesota, and grew up playing hockey, gridiron football, and baseball, as well as competing on the track and field team, for Warroad High School. He later attended the University of North Dakota in Grand Forks, where he played for the North Dakota Fighting Sioux hockey team and played in the 1979 national championship, but North Dakota lost the final to the University of Minnesota and Christian's future Olympic teammate, Neal Broten.

== Professional and international career ==
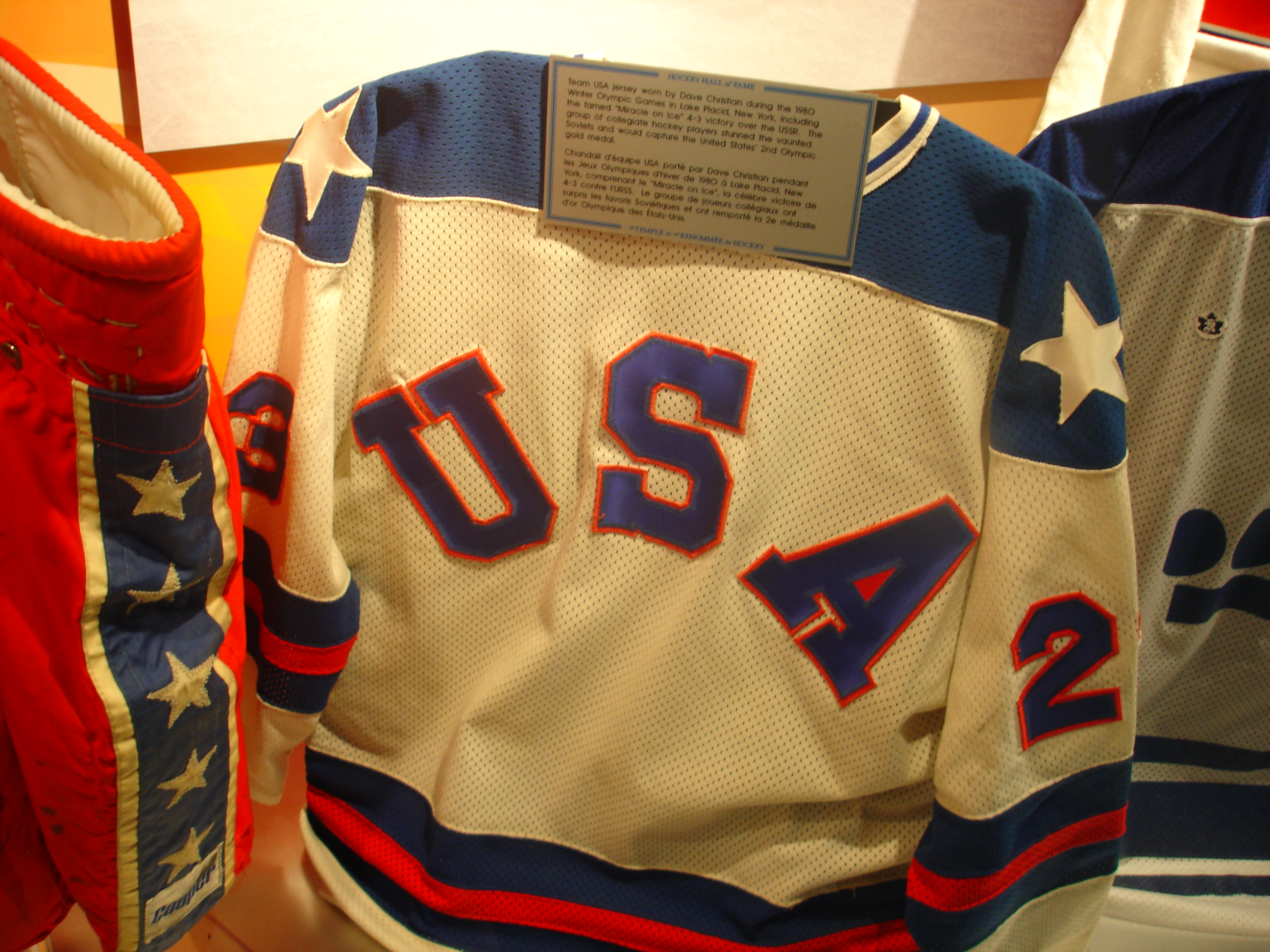
Dave Christian's jersey from the 1980 Winter Olympics on display at the Hockey Hall of Fame

Christian was a member of the 1980 U.S. Olympic hockey team that won the gold medal in an event known as the Miracle on Ice during the 1980 Winter Olympics. He also played for the U.S. national team at the 1981 Canada Cup, as well as the 1981 Ice Hockey World Championships tournaments as an NHL rookie. His international career continued in the 1984 Canada Cup, 1989 Ice Hockey World Championships and 1991 Canada Cup tournaments.

Christian's professional hockey career started one week after the Miracle on Ice when he joined the Winnipeg Jets, who drafted him 40th overall in the 1979 NHL entry draft. Christian set the record for the fastest goal by a player in his first NHL game, scoring seven seconds into his first shift. After a career in Winnipeg, where he scored 70 or more points in both seasons following the 1980 Olympics, he went on to play with the Washington Capitals, where he led the team in assists his first season there, with 52. He also added 29 goals, and after the Capitals he would go on to play with the Chicago Blackhawks, Boston Bruins, and St. Louis Blues, ending his NHL career with 340 goals and 433 assists in 1,009 NHL regular season games. He also made an appearance in the Stanley Cup Finals as a member of the Boston Bruins in 1990, losing to the Edmonton Oilers in five games.

== Post career ==
Christian was named head coach and general manager of the United States Hockey League Fargo-Moorhead Ice Sharks near the end of the 1997–98 season and held the positions through the 1999–2000 season.

== Family ==
Christian comes from a family of hockey players. His father Bill and uncle Roger were members of the 1960 U.S. Olympic Hockey Team that won the gold medal. Another uncle, Gordon, was a member of the 1956 U.S. Olympic Hockey Team that won the silver medal. Bill and Roger, along with Hal Bakke, were the founders of the Christian Brothers Hockey Company based in Warroad, which until 2009 made hockey sticks. Christian's nephew, Brock Nelson, is also an NHL player and was selected for the 2026 U.S. Olympic Hockey Team, which won the gold medal.

== Awards and achievements ==
Christian played in the 1991 NHL All-Star Game. Christian was inducted into the United States Hockey Hall of Fame in 2001.

== In popular culture ==
In the 1981 TV movie about the gold medal-winning hockey team entitled Miracle on Ice, Christian is played by Thomas F. Duffy. In the 2004 Disney film Miracle, he is played by Steve Kovalcik.

== Career statistics ==
=== Regular season and playoffs ===
			Regular season					Playoffs
Season	Team	League	GP	G	A	Pts	PIM	GP	G	A	Pts	PIM
1976–77	Warroad High School	HS-MN	—	—	—	—	—	—	—	—	—	—
1977–78	University of North Dakota	WCHA	38	8	16	24	14	—	—	—	—	—
1978–79	University of North Dakota	WCHA	40	22	24	46	22	—	—	—	—	—
1979–80	American National Team	Intl	59	10	20	30	26	—	—	—	—	—
1979–80	Winnipeg Jets	NHL	15	8	10	18	2	—	—	—	—	—
1980–81	Winnipeg Jets	NHL	80	28	43	71	22	—	—	—	—	—
1981–82	Winnipeg Jets	NHL	80	25	51	76	28	4	0	1	1	2
1982–83	Winnipeg Jets	NHL	55	18	26	44	23	3	0	0	0	0
1983–84	Washington Capitals	NHL	80	29	52	81	28	8	5	4	9	5
1984–85	Washington Capitals	NHL	80	26	43	69	14	5	1	1	2	0
1985–86	Washington Capitals	NHL	80	41	42	83	15	9	4	4	8	0
1986–87	Washington Capitals	NHL	76	23	27	50	8	7	1	3	4	6
1987–88	Washington Capitals	NHL	80	37	21	58	26	14	5	6	11	6
1988–89	Washington Capitals	NHL	80	34	31	65	12	6	1	1	2	0
1989–90	Washington Capitals	NHL	28	3	8	11	4	—	—	—	—	—
1989–90	Boston Bruins	NHL	50	12	17	29	8	21	4	1	5	4
1990–91	Boston Bruins	NHL	78	32	21	53	41	19	8	4	12	4
1991–92	St. Louis Blues	NHL	78	20	24	44	41	4	3	0	3	0
1992–93	Chicago Blackhawks	NHL	60	4	14	18	12	1	0	0	0	0
1993–94	Indianapolis Ice	IHL	40	8	18	26	6	—	—	—	—	—
1993–94	Chicago Blackhawks	NHL	9	0	3	3	0	1	0	0	0	0
1994–95	Minnesota Moose	IHL	81	38	42	80	16	3	0	1	1	0
1995–96	Minnesota Moose	IHL	69	21	25	46	8	—	—	—	—	—
NHL totals			1,009	340	433	773	284	102	32	25	57	27

=== International ===
Year	Team	Event	GP	G	A	Pts	PIM
1979	United States	WJC	5	2	1	3	0
1980	United States	OLY	7	0	8	8	6
1981	United States	WC	8	8	3	11	6
1981	United States	CC	6	1	0	1	4
1984	United States	CC	6	2	1	3	2
1989	United States	WC	6	4	3	7	2
1991	United States	CC	7	1	1	2	0
Junior totals			5	2	1	3	0
Senior totals			40	16	16	32	20

== See also ==
- List of members of the United States Hockey Hall of Fame
- List of NHL players with 1,000 games played
- List of Olympic medalist families

Preceded by Morris Lukowich	Winnipeg Jets captain 1981–82	Succeeded by Lucien DeBlois
