= Warroad, Minnesota =

City in Minnesota, United States

Warroad
- City
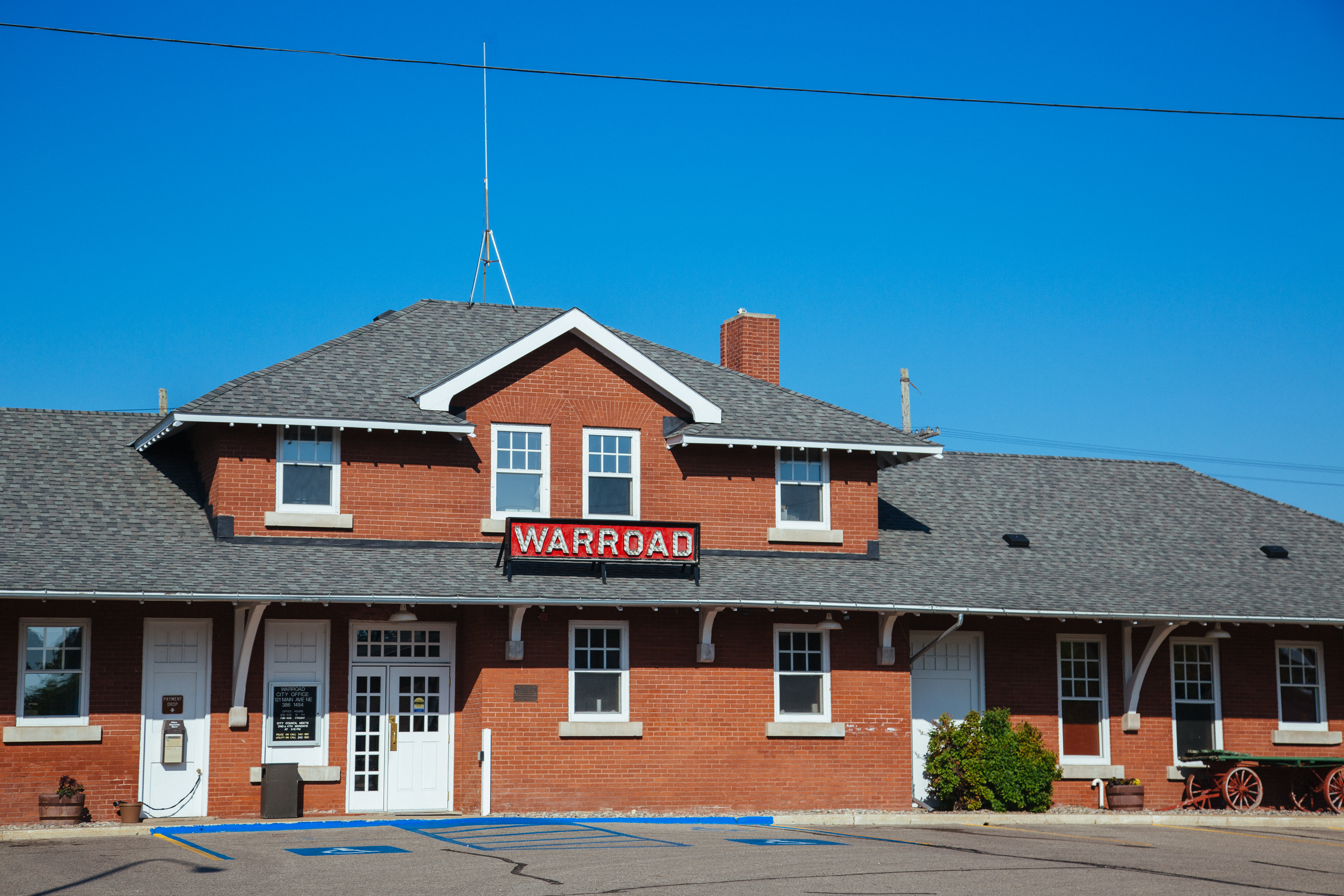
- Warroad City Hall
- Nickname: Hockeytown, USA
- Location of Warroad within Roseau County and state of Minnesota
- Coordinates: 48°54′19″N 95°18′52″W
- Country: United States
- State: Minnesota
- County: Roseau

Area
  - Total: 3.38 sq mi (8.76 km^{2})
  - Land: 3.27 sq mi (8.48 km^{2})
  - Water: 0.11 sq mi (0.29 km^{2})
- Elevation: 1,066 ft (325 m)

Population (2020)
  - Total: 1,830
  - Density: 559.1/sq mi (215.87/km^{2})
- Time zone: UTC-6 (Central (CST))
  - Summer (DST): UTC-5 (CDT)
- ZIP code: 56763
- Area code: 218
- FIPS code: 27-68224
- GNIS feature ID: 0653790
- Website: warroadmn.org

Warroad is a city in Roseau County, Minnesota, United States, at the southwest corner of Lake of the Woods, 7.5 miles (12.1 km) south of Canada. The population was 1,830 at the 2020 census. Warroad had its own newspaper before it was incorporated in 1901.

Minnesota State Highways 11 and 313 are two of the city's main routes.

== History ==
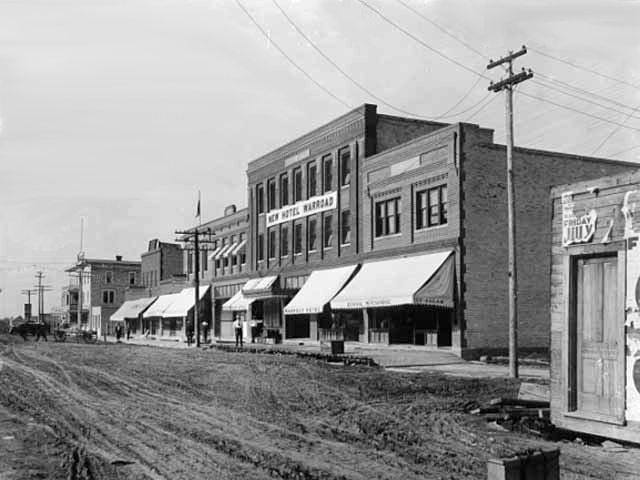
Warroad, circa 1910

Warroad was once one of the largest Ojibwe villages on Lake of the Woods. The Ojibwe fought a long war against the Sioux for the lake's rice fields. Occupying the prairies of the Red River Valley, the Sioux often invaded the territory by way of the Red and Roseau Rivers, a route that ended at the mouth of the Warroad River. This was the old "war road" from which the river and village derive their name.

In the 20th century, Warroad had a strong commercial fishing industry, which gradually turned to sport fishing and tourism. For many years, commercial boats provided regular service to the islands and to Kenora, Ontario, at the north end of Lake of the Woods. The lumber industry also boomed, bringing the Great Northern and Canadian National railways to town and seeing the beginning of one of the largest window manufacturers, Marvin Windows.

Warroad is also called "Hockeytown USA" for its strong hockey tradition. The Warroad High School program has earned five men's state championship titles (1994,1996, 2003, 2005, 2026) and four women's (2010, 2011, 2022, 2023) over 20 years, and has produced NHL and Olympic players. Up to and including 2026, no U.S. Hockey Olympic men's team has won a gold medal without a player from Warroad. Another important piece of Warroad hockey history is the Warroad Lakers amateur team, which existed from 1947 to 1997.

== Geography ==
Warroad is along the southwest shore of Lake of the Woods at Muskeg Bay, east of Roseau and west of Baudette. Warroad is 7.5 miles south of Canada. The Warroad River flows through town.

According to the United States Census Bureau, the city has an area of 2.90 square miles (7.51 km^{2}), of which 2.79 square miles (7.23 km^{2}) is land and 0.11 square miles (0.28 km^{2}) is water.

=== Climate ===
Warroad has a humid continental climate, moderately moist, in central North America but drier than those found in New England or Ontario Eastern (Dfb in the Koppen classification). It has one of the most rigorous winters in the contiguous United States, in which cold Arctic air can invade unobstructed and stay for up to a few weeks, and at its latitude, the hours of winter sunshine are relatively short, increasing the chill hours relative to other places of similar altitude. Summers are moderately hot to hot as air masses advance from the Gulf of Mexico, especially in July and August, although the average annual temperature is 36.6 °F (2.6 °C) and 27.69 inches (703.3 mm) of precipitation annually, concentrated heavily in summer.

Climate data for Warroad, Minnesota, 1991–2020 normals, extremes 1901–present
Month	Jan	Feb	Mar	Apr	May	Jun	Jul	Aug	Sep	Oct	Nov	Dec	Year
Record high °F (°C)	50 (10)	56 (13)	81 (27)	93 (34)	99 (37)	102 (39)	103 (39)	101 (38)	96 (36)	86 (30)	81 (27)	53 (12)	103 (39)
Mean maximum °F (°C)	36.4 (2.4)	40.6 (4.8)	54.4 (12.4)	72.5 (22.5)	83.1 (28.4)	86.9 (30.5)	88.0 (31.1)	88.3 (31.3)	84.3 (29.1)	73.0 (22.8)	53.9 (12.2)	37.9 (3.3)	90.9 (32.7)
Mean daily maximum °F (°C)	13.2 (−10.4)	18.9 (−7.3)	32.5 (0.3)	47.6 (8.7)	62.2 (16.8)	72.0 (22.2)	76.9 (24.9)	75.4 (24.1)	66.3 (19.1)	50.8 (10.4)	33.5 (0.8)	19.2 (−7.1)	47.4 (8.5)
Daily mean °F (°C)	2.6 (−16.3)	7.0 (−13.9)	21.0 (−6.1)	36.1 (2.3)	50.9 (10.5)	61.4 (16.3)	65.8 (18.8)	63.8 (17.7)	54.7 (12.6)	40.9 (4.9)	25.1 (−3.8)	10.3 (−12.1)	36.6 (2.6)
Mean daily minimum °F (°C)	−8.0 (−22.2)	−4.8 (−20.4)	9.6 (−12.4)	24.7 (−4.1)	39.5 (4.2)	50.7 (10.4)	54.6 (12.6)	52.1 (11.2)	43.1 (6.2)	30.9 (−0.6)	16.7 (−8.5)	1.4 (−17.0)	25.9 (−3.4)
Mean minimum °F (°C)	−30.4 (−34.7)	−26.4 (−32.4)	−14.1 (−25.6)	11.5 (−11.4)	27.0 (−2.8)	40.4 (4.7)	45.9 (7.7)	42.8 (6.0)	31.6 (−0.2)	18.9 (−7.3)	−1.7 (−18.7)	−21.2 (−29.6)	−33.3 (−36.3)
Record low °F (°C)	−55 (−48)	−55 (−48)	−42 (−41)	−18 (−28)	14 (−10)	28 (−2)	32 (0)	29 (−2)	16 (−9)	−12 (−24)	−30 (−34)	−50 (−46)	−55 (−48)
Average precipitation inches (mm)	0.77 (20)	0.56 (14)	0.81 (21)	1.59 (40)	3.49 (89)	4.77 (121)	3.69 (94)	4.30 (109)	3.00 (76)	2.52 (64)	1.26 (32)	0.93 (24)	27.69 (704)
Average snowfall inches (cm)	8.7 (22)	4.8 (12)	5.7 (14)	2.7 (6.9)	0.0 (0.0)	0.0 (0.0)	0.0 (0.0)	0.0 (0.0)	0.0 (0.0)	0.9 (2.3)	4.8 (12)	10.1 (26)	37.7 (95.2)
Average precipitation days (≥ 0.01 in)	6.7	4.0	5.1	6.3	12.3	12.8	11.6	10.1	11.0	9.4	6.5	7.5	103.3
Average snowy days (≥ 0.1 in)	5.4	3.8	2.9	1.5	0.0	0.0	0.0	0.0	0.0	0.3	3.4	5.6	22.9
Source 1: NOAA
Source 2: National Weather Service

== Demographics ==
Historical population
Census	Pop.	Note	%±
1900	238		—
1910	927		289.5%
1920	1,211		30.6%
1930	1,184		−2.2%
1940	1,309		10.6%
1950	1,276		−2.5%
1960	1,309		2.6%
1970	1,086		−17.0%
1980	1,216		12.0%
1990	1,679		38.1%
2000	1,722		2.6%
2010	1,781		3.4%
2020	1,830		2.8%
U.S. Decennial Census

=== 2020 census ===
As of the 2020 census, Warroad had a population of 1,830. The median age was 39.2 years. 25.6% of residents were under the age of 18 and 17.0% of residents were 65 years of age or older. For every 100 females there were 94.3 males, and for every 100 females age 18 and over there were 93.9 males age 18 and over.

0.0% of residents lived in urban areas, while 100.0% lived in rural areas.

There were 785 households in Warroad, of which 30.8% had children under the age of 18 living in them. Of all households, 40.0% were married-couple households, 25.1% were households with a male householder and no spouse or partner present, and 29.8% were households with a female householder and no spouse or partner present. About 38.4% of all households were made up of individuals and 15.1% had someone living alone who was 65 years of age or older.

There were 854 housing units, of which 8.1% were vacant. The homeowner vacancy rate was 1.4% and the rental vacancy rate was 11.1%.

Racial composition as of the 2020 census
Race	Number	Percent
White	1,431	78.2%
Black or African American	14	0.8%
American Indian and Alaska Native	136	7.4%
Asian	118	6.4%
Native Hawaiian and Other Pacific Islander	0	0.0%
Some other race	14	0.8%
Two or more races	117	6.4%
Hispanic or Latino (of any race)	44	2.4%

=== 2010 census ===
As of the census of 2010, there were 1,781 people, 764 households, and 452 families residing in the city. The population density was 638.4 inhabitants per square mile (246.5/km^{2}). There were 839 housing units at an average density of 300.7 per square mile (116.1/km^{2}). The racial makeup of the city was 83.3% White, 0.1% African American, 5.7% Native American, 8.5% Asian, and 2.5% from two or more races. Hispanic or Latino of any race were 1.0% of the population.

There were 764 households, of which 33.0% had children under the age of 18 living with them, 40.3% were married couples living together, 11.9% had a female householder with no husband present, 6.9% had a male householder with no wife present, and 40.8% were non-families. 36.0% of all households were made up of individuals, and 12.1% had someone living alone who was 65 years of age or older. The average household size was 2.27 and the average family size was 2.93.

The median age in the city was 38.9 years. 25% of residents were under the age of 18; 10% were between the ages of 18 and 24; 23.7% were from 25 to 44; 26.2% were from 45 to 64; and 15.2% were 65 years of age or older. The gender makeup of the city was 50.0% male and 50.0% female.

=== 2000 census ===
As of the census of 2000, there were 1,722 people, 657 households, and 419 families residing in the city. The population density was 254.7/km^{2} (660/sq mi). There were 766 housing units at an average density of 113.3/km^{2} (293/sq mi). The racial makeup of the city was 81.65% White, 0.29% Black or African American, 7.38% Native American, 9.18% Asian, 0.00% Pacific Islander, 0.00% from other races, and 1.51% from two or more races. 0.0% of the population were Hispanic or Latino of any race. According to the 2000 US Census, the town had the US's highest percentage of Laotian Americans.

There were 657 households, out of which 39.3% had children under the age of 18 living with them, 48.6% were married couples living together, 10.5% had a female householder with no husband present, and 36.1% were non-families. 32.4% of all households were made up of individuals, and 9.6% had someone living alone who was 65 years of age or older. The average household size was 2.52 and the average family size was 3.22.

In the city, the population was spread out, with 31.5% under the age of 18, 7.8% from 18 to 24, 30.3% from 25 to 44, 18.5% from 45 to 64, and 12.0% who were 65 years of age or older. The median age was 33 years. For every 100 females, there were 97.7 males. For every 100 females age 18 and over, there were 96.0 males.

The median income for a household in the city was $34,948, and the median income for a family was $44,667. Males had a median income of $27,123 versus $22,465 for females. The per capita income for the city was $16,412. 8.8% of the population and 7.3% of families were below the poverty line. Out of the total population, 10.7% of those under the age of 18 and 7.8% of those 65 and older were living below the poverty line.

== Media ==
=== Newspaper ===
The Warroad Pioneer was Warroad's newspaper for 120 years until its final edition on May 7, 2019.

=== Radio ===
- KRXW FM 103.5, KKWQ FM 92.5, and KRWB (AM) 1410, all broadcast from Warroad

== Notable people ==
- Robert Baril, stand-up comedian
- Henry Boucha, former NHL player and 1972 Winter Olympic Silver Medalist, hockey. Born and raised in Warroad. Member of the U.S. Hockey Hall of Fame.
- Bill Christian, 1960 Winter Olympian, Gold Medalist, hockey. Member of the U.S. Hockey Hall of Fame and the IIHF Hall of Fame.
- Dave Christian, former NHL player and 1980 Winter Olympic Gold Medalist, hockey. Member of the U.S. Hockey Hall of Fame.
- Gordon Christian, 1956 Winter Olympian, Silver Medalist, hockey.
- Roger Christian, 1960 Winter Olympian, Gold Medalist, hockey. Member of the U.S. Hockey Hall of Fame.
- Alan Hangsleben, former NHL player born in Warroad.
- Gigi Marvin, member of the U.S. national women's ice hockey team, and gold medalist. Marvin made a goal in the shootout against Canada in the Pyeongchang 2018 Olympic game where Team USA went on to win Gold. She also won a silver medal at the 2010 and 2014 Olympic Winter Games. Her grandfather is Cal Marvin, the coach of the 1958 United States Men's National Ice Hockey Team.
- Brock Nelson, NHL player (Colorado Avalanche) and 2026 Winter Olympic gold medalist, hockey
- T. J. Oshie, NHL player for the Washington Capitals, helped Warroad's high school hockey team win the state championship. Scored winning goal in the eighth round of the shootout in the 2014 Winter Olympics for the U.S., beating Team Russia in a preliminary game. 2018 NHL Stanley Cup Champion with the Capitals.
- Sheila Terry, actress, 1910–1957

== Infrastructure ==
=== Railway depot ===
In 1900, Warroad became a stop on the Canadian Northern Railway, and a depot opened in March. The rail line extended from Thunder Bay to Winnipeg, and eventually included Duluth. A fire destroyed the wooden depot in July 1914, and it was rebuilt using brick. The station was two stories tall and included offices for customs, immigration, a baggage area, waiting room, and a stationmaster's quarters.

After World War I, use of the station dropped due to economic stagnation, the Great Depression, and a declining lumber industry. The last passenger train to stop at Warraod was in July 1977, and the station was closed in 1978. The station was added to the National Register of Historic Places in 1982, and began renovations in 1983. By July 1985, the station was used as city offices and a public library, and from 1990 to 2005 was used as the town police station. As of 2022, the depot is used as city hall.

== Popular culture ==
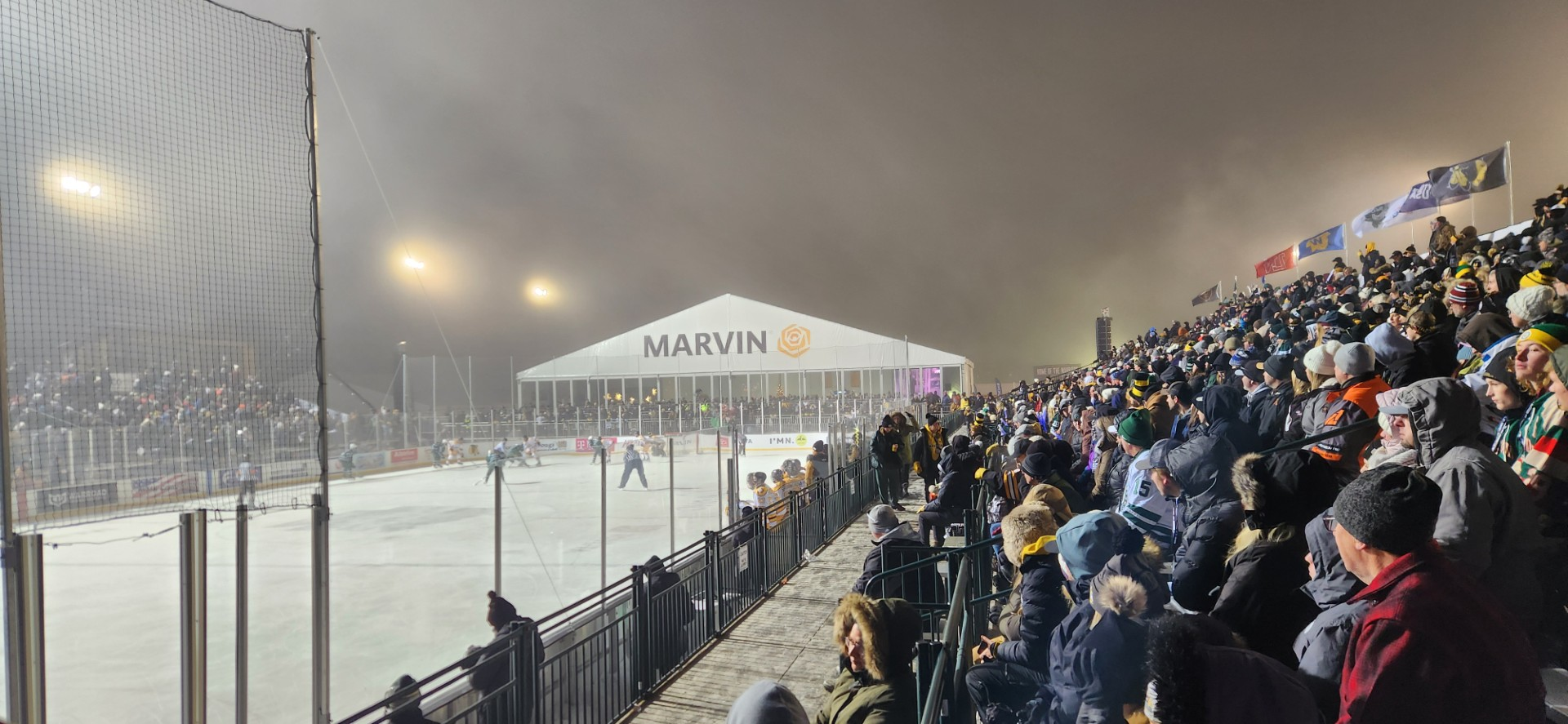
Fans in attendance for Hockey Day Minnesota 2024 in Warroad Minnesota

In the television show The West Wing, character Donna Moss claims to be from Warroad in the episode "Dead Irish Writers". She becomes classified as a non-U.S. citizen when the Canada–US border is moved such that Warroad is in Canada.

Warroad was the host of Hockey Day Minnesota in 2024.

== See also ==
- Warroad-Sprague Border Crossing
- Warroad International Memorial Airport
