= Powell River Regals =

- City: Powell River, British Columbia
- League: West Coast Senior Hockey League
- Founded: 1955
- Home arena: Hap Parker Arena
- Colours: Green, Gold, Black, and White
- General manager: Tod English
- Head coach: Tod English

Franchise history
- 1955-1957: Powell River Luckies
- 1957-present: Powell River Regals

The Powell River Regals are a Canadian Senior AA ice hockey team from Powell River, British Columbia. Since the 2025–26 season, the Regals have played in the West Coast Senior Hockey League (WCSHL), winning the league's McCallum Cup in its first season. Before that, the team played an independent schedule under the supervision of BC Hockey, also known as the BC Amateur Hockey Association. Prior to the 2015–16 season, when the team temporarily ceased operation, the Regals competed as a Senior AAA team, winning the BC Senior AAA Savage Cup 14 times between 1994–95 and 2014–15, and were three-time Allan Cup National Senior AAA Champions and one-time Hardy Cup National Intermediate "A" Champions.

== Titles ==
The Regals won the Senior "AAA" 1997 Allan Cup with a win over three-time defending champion Warroad Lakers in the final, the 2000 Allan Cup by beating the Lloydminster Border Kings in the championship game, and the 2006 Allan Cup with a 7-1 drubbing of the Whitby Dunlops. Powell River was also a finalist at the 1999 Allan Cup, losing to the Stony Plain Eagles 5–3. Earlier in their history, the Regals won the 1970 Hardy Cup championship as Intermediate "A" hockey champions of Canada with a three games to two, best-of-five series win over Val-d'Or, Quebec.

== The 1950s ==
After the Willingdon Civic Arena was completed in 1955, a three-team local league comprised Home Gas, Rodmay's and Wilshire's Variety Store. George Whyte and Vic Lupul, who later played for the Regals, were members of these teams, as were the three Hildebrand brothers. A traveling team called the Powell River Luckies was then formed. Coached by Johnny Gorman, the Luckies played in a league with Coquitlam, Nanaimo and New Westminster.

When the Rodmay Hotel, under the management of Al Mantoani, acquired the sponsorship of the team in 1957 a “name the team” contest was held with Powell River Rodmay Regals as the winning entry. This began an association that lasted for more than a decade. Under multiple sponsorship since 1972, the team is now known as the Powell River Regals. Several of the Luckies players joined the Regals including, Gene Strueby, George Whyte, Dave Kineshanko, Jim Raisbeck, Wally Anderson, Don Alsop and Wally Hretchka.

Under the direction of their first three coaches, —Jim Raisbeck, Mike Shabaga and Bob Bergeron, the team was unable to get past the Nanaimo Clippers. The Clippers, who were Hardy Cup finalists during one of those seasons, became arch-rivals for the Regals for many years to come.

== The 1960s ==
In the 1961–62 season, guided by coach Andy McCallum, the Regals advanced to the Coy Cup finals for the first time. They lost that series to the powerhouse Twin City Macs from the Okanagan.

Regals made their second and third consecutive trips to the Coy Cup finals in the following two seasons but were defeated on each occasion by the Kamloops Chiefs. Beset by insurmountable problems and without a league to play in, the Regals hung up their gear for the 1964–65 season.

The following year the Regals again reached the Coy Cup finals. Playing in Quesnel against the Kangaroos, the Regals lost a bitterly fought series. Down to nine players due to injuries, the team fought for two and a half periods of overtime before losing to the Kangaroos.

The Regals became Coy Cup champions for the first of four times in 1966-67 as they beat the Prince George Mohawks in two straight games. Their next opponents, the Lloydminster Borderkings, would become familiar to the Regals, and would defeat the team that season.

Quesnel recaptured the Coy Cup the following season, stopping the Regals’ drive for a second-straight provincial title.

In 1968–69, a serious incident in a game against the Shmyr Flyers forced Andy McCallum to retire and Bob Crawford took up the coaching reins. Crawford led the Regals to their second Coy Cup title, but the Lloydminster Borderkings once again won the game.

== 1969-70 ==
The Regals finished the mid-April 1970 season as Canadian Hardy Cup Champions of Canada. The year did not start well with players being scarce and the team seeming unable to jell. The addition of Dave Parenteau was a great help, and after Christmas the team's performance included. The Regals finished second in the regular season standings and faced, and then defeated, Comox in the first round of the playoffs. Port Alberni Labatts were the next opponents and as usual were no pushovers but the Regals did eventually prevail. The Chemanius Blues did not put up much of a fight as the Regals swept the series in high scoring, one-sided affairs. Regals and Shmyr Flyers split the first two games of their series forcing a third and deciding game. The evenly matched teams were tied at the end of regulation play, and the Regals advanced with two goals in the 10-minute overtime period. The Prince George Mohawks did not score in the next series as the Regals rode strong goaltending performances to win in two straight.

Kimberley was all that stood in the way of a third Coy Cup title and after the series victory, the Regals hosted Lloydminster in the next round. This time, the Regals won and advanced to the Canadian finals. All games were to be played in the westernmost point, and Val D’our, Quebec, came to Powell River for a best-of-five series to determine the Hardy Cup champions of Canada. The teams split the first four games, forcing a fifth and deciding game, which would be a 5-3 victory.

== The 1970s ==
Several members of the team retired in the years following the Hardy Cup championship leaving the club to undertake a rebuilding program. Regals defeated Port Alberni in the 1970-71 league final, but the following year Labatts ended a 10-year domination of the league by the Regals.

In 1972-73 many of the old-time players suited up for a game to boost the injured players fund. They included Rudy Pantuso, Andy McCallum, Barry Lang, George Whyte, Doug Lessor, Gene Strueby, Al Small, Wally Anderson, Bob Keil, Desi Lever, Orris Sage, Ev Henderson and Mel Waldron. Russell Sage joined the Regals becoming the first son to follow in his father's footsteps.

The team moved to the new Powell River Recreation Complex for the 1975–76 season and dominated the Pacific Coast Amateur Hockey League. Even with Len Pepper, the league's top scorer, the team was unable to put together a lengthy playoff run.

The Regals joined the North West Hockey League in 1976-77 and played in the North Island Intermediate Hockey league the following season before rejoining the PCAHL for the final two years of the decade. However, they made only one Coy Cup semi-final appearance.

== The 1980s ==
After ceasing operations in 1980–81, the Regals once again played in the PCAHL in 1981-82 but struggled, winning just two games all year. Legendary defenceman John Vanderkemp made his debut during that season and was a regular winner or contender for the club's best defenceman award for the next 25 seasons. Randy Casparie, also a rookie, went on to become one of only four players to score over 200 career goals in a Regal uniform. Mike Andrews, also a member of the 200 goal club, was in his second season with the club and, along with Vanderkemp and Casparie, would form the core of a team in the 1980s that, with the additions of players like Pierre Roy, Gary Pierce, Verne Kinley, Tod English, Darren Clark and Brian Inkster, would climb up the rankings and quickly become one of the top teams in both the league and the province.

The Regals' fortunes turned quickly in the 1982–83 season, as they became one of the top teams in the league and earned a trip to the league finals. The Chilliwack Royals denied the Regals of the league title that season and in each of the three seasons that followed. The 1985 series was the only time the Regals pushed the Royals to a seventh and deciding game. Trailing three games to two and playing game six at home, Brian Inkster scored the winner on a penalty shot late in regulation to send the series back to Chilliwack. In game seven, with goaltender Irv Stoddart pulled, Regals defenseman Tod Semenuk notched his fourth goal of the game and sent it to overtime. The teams battled into two periods of overtime before the Royals prevailed.

In 1986–87, the Regals made it back to the Coy Cup final for the first time since the Canadian championship season of 1969–70. They faced the Kangaroos in Quesnel, but a 7-3 third-period lead in the deciding game was not enough, and the Kangaroos stormed back to win the game, the series, and their sixth straight Coy Cup. The same two teams faced off for the title the following season, this time in Powell River. The home crowd wasn't enough and the powerful Kangaroos took the series in two straight games. Quesnel's seven-year hold on the Coy Cup ended in 1988-89, but the Abbotsford Blues claimed the trophy by defeating the Regals in Powell River, handing the local team its third-straight finals defeat.

== The 1990s ==
The BC Amateur Hockey Association adopted a four-team tournament format for the 1989–90 season to determine the Coy Cup champion. After downing Quesnel during the round-robin portion of the tournament, the Regals lost to the Kangaroos in overtime of the semi-final game.

1990-91 marked the first occasion in which the Regals played for the AAA Savage Cup provincial title. Not having a league to play in was the main reason for the step up. The team breezed through the round-robin, received a bye to the final, and were able to rest and watch the host Whitehorse Canadians fall to Abbotsford in the semi-final. However, the Regals got into early penalty trouble in the championship game, fell behind, and were never able to recover.

Regals joined the Royal City Hockey league in 1991-92 and would again play for the Coy Cup. With just 16 players on the score sheet, the team won 4-3 in the semi-finals over Sicamous and set up a final match with the host Penticton Silver Bullets. Despite a strong goaltending performance by Tyler Findlater, two timely second-period goals by Verne Kinley and a third period marker by Russ Simmons, Penticton won after an empty-net goal late in the third.

The 23-year drought ended in 1992–93. The acquisition of high-scoring defenseman Jim Smith boosted the team's offense. After taking both the league and playoff titles in the RCHL, the Regals hosted the Coy Cup tournament and received the bye to the final after round-robin wins over Sicamous and Fort St. John, and a tie with the New Westminster Beavers. The Beavers made their way to the final as well and faced the Regals for the ninth time that season. The game ended the same way as the first seven matches, a Regals victory.

The team once again moved up to the AAA level in 1993-94 and dominated the RCHL losing just two games all year and was perdicted to win the four-team Savage Cup tournament held in Prince George. They were the first team ousted after losses to the host club and similar outcomes against Quesnel and the eventual champions from Penticton. Important additions that year were Scott Mastrodonato and Trevor Forsythe who combined with Vanderkemp and Smith to form a solid core on defence for many years.

The RCHL became the West Coast Senior Hockey League in 1994-95. The Regals once again finished atop the standings just ahead of vastly improving New Westminster. In April 1995 the Regals hosted the Savage Cup tournament and earned the bye to the final with wins over Prince George, Bellingham and Quesnel. The Kangaroos reached the final as well, but the Regals coming out with a 5-4 double overtime victory on a goal by Jim Smith. The following weekend the Regals travelled to Stony Plain, Alberta, to play for a national championship for the first time in 25 years. After losing the first game to the defending champions from Warroad, Minnesota, Regals defeated Truro, Nova Scotia 6-1 before being eliminated by the host team after a 5–3 loss. Shortly after the end of the season, the club submitted a successful bid to host the 1997 Allan Cup tournament.

Regals defended their Savage Cup title in 1995–96 with a three games to one series win over the Prince George Lumber Kings. The Kings earned a split of the first two games in Powell River, and the remainder of the series would be played in the northern BC city. After taking Game 3, Regals trailed by two goals after 40 minutes of game four until Mark Bogoslowski scored twice in the third to complete his hat-trick and lead his team to victory. Their next opponent was Stony Plain in the BC/Alberta finals. All games in the best-of-five series were to be held in the town just outside Edmonton. The home team would only need three of them to secure the win and move on to the Allan Cup, edging the Regals by scores of 7–5, 5-3 and 4–2.

After two years of planning and preparation, the Allan Cup tournament took place in Powell River from April 8 to 12, 1997. Regional champions from Stony Plain (West), Truro, Nova Scotia (East) and Warroad, Minnesota (Central) joined the host Regals to battle for the Canadian Senior AAA title. Regals downed Truro and Warroad, then skated to a 3–3 tie with Stony Plain to finish atop the round-robin and secure a berth in the final. Third-place finisher and three-time defending Allan Cup champion Warroad upset second place Truro in the semi-final and joined the Regals in the championship game. Trailing 2–1, Regals scored two late second period goals and never looked back. Bob Moon scored the eventual winner early in the third followed by Rick McLaren's insurance marker, the second of the game for the team's rookie of the year. Warroad answered once more but tournament MVP Scott Mastrodonato's goal into an empty net sealed a 7–3 victory for the home team in front of a packed recreation complex arena.

The 1997–98 season once again resulted in Stony Plain representing Alberta and the Regals doing the same for British Columbia. The best-of-five series was played in Powell River with the Regals winning games 1, 2 and 4 backed by strong goaltending from Chad Vizzutti. The team went to Nova Scotia to attempt to defend their title. Competition was stiff, and the Regals finished the round-robin in fourth and would advance no further after losses to Truro and London, Ontario, and a win over Ile des Chenes, Manitoba.

Stony Plain hosted the 1999 Allan Cup tournament and finished first after edging the Regals by a goal in the final game of the round-robin. Regals got past Lloydminster in the semi-final and advanced to the final, where they played their fifth game in five days. The well-rested host team took advantage of the weary Regals with three early goals and eventually built a 5–0 lead. Rick McLaren finally got the Regals on the board in the second with a short-handed goal, building momentum for his team. Regals would get as close as 5-3 and dominated the third period, but time ran out and the home team won the Allan Cup.

== 2000 and beyond ==
The 1999–2000 season started off on a positive note as the Regals hosted a Russian Elite Division team in a pair of exhibition games. The teams skated to a 6–6 tie in the first game, which included a last-minute goal by the home team to even things up. The visitors managed a 5–3 win the following day.

In the playoffs, Stony Plain and the Regals met in the BC/Alberta final for the third time. Bill MacGillvrey and former Stanley Cup winner Ken Preistlay were key additions for the team's playoff run. The Eagles picked up one win in the best-of-five held in Powell River but series MVP Chad Vizzutti was nearly unbeatable in games one, three and four enabling the home team to take the series in four games. Next up was the Allan Cup tournament in Lloydminster. Regals skated to a 10–2 win over Regina in the first game then fell to Saint Georges, Quebec and the host club from Lloydminster in their next two outings. With Regina losing their final two games, Regals secured third place in the round-robin and a spot in the semi-final against Saint Georges. Strong goaltending, the game plan from coach Kent Lewis, and timely scoring allowed the Regals to defeat the Quebec team and move on to the final. With a sold-out crowd behind them, Lloydminster came out strong in the first period. The Regals' all-time leading scorer Tod English scored a first-period goal, and Chad Vizzutti weathered the storm, turning away each shot he faced. Lloydminster tied the game in the second but third period goals by tournament MVP Trent Kaese and right-winger Mike Hassman gave the Regals a two-goal cushion. After an empty net goal and a 37-save performance by Vizzutti, the Regals claimed the Allan Cup for the second time in four seasons.

In 2000–2001, the Canadian Amateur Hockey Association rewarded the Regals for their Allan Cup victory by sending the team to represent Canada at the Nagano Cup tournament in Japan. There, the Canadian/Regals team won 3–2 over Japan. With both Chad Vizzutti and Scott Peters hurt, Canada/Regals went with Jamie Ram in goal in the final game and after a couple bounces, Poland eked out a 6–5 win to claim the Nagano Cup. However, in the fourth BC/Alberta final between the Regals and Stony Plain, the Eagles prevented the Regals from defending their title with a three-game series sweep.

Regals hosted the Allan Cup for the second time in April 2002. Familiar foes won their way to Powell River as Stony Plain, Saint Georges and Warroad were the regional representatives. The six game round-robin ended with Warroad winless and eliminated. The three remaining teams all had 2-1 records with Stony Plain getting the bye to the final because of goal differential. During the semi-final, each team took turns holding the lead only to see their opponent fight back and tie the score. The crowd erupted in the final minute when Jim Smith's shot from the point found its way into the net to send the game into overtime. Minutes later, Saint Georges became the overtime winner on a breakaway. The Quebec champions went on to defeat Stony Plain in the final and become the first visiting team to win a national title on Powell River ice.

In 2002-2003 the club decided to ice both a AA team to play for the Coy Cup provincial title and a AAA squad to continue the quest for another Savage and Allan Cup. After advancing to the Coy Cup final game in Trail, the AA team lost 2–1 in overtime, though 23-year-old Jeffrey Parsons, fresh off his gold medal win in Sweden at Deaf world Championships, scored 12 points in four games to take Coy Cup MVP award in a dominant performance despite the loss. The AAA squad hosted the Savage Cup best-of-five final against Dawson Creek Canucks. The series was a sweep, but the scores were far from lopsided. The home team took the first game 6-3 followed by a 6–5 win in game two. The third and final game went into overtime, where Kent Lewis set up Mike Hassman for the winner, sending the Regals on to the BC/Alberta final. However, the team scored only one goal in a three-game sweep by the Eagles.

The Regals traveled to Dawson Creek for the 2003-2004 Savage Cup tournament and fell in marathon semi-final match against the host club in the fourth-overtime period. The loss ended the Regals' reign as AAA champions of British Columbia, which had begun in 1995.

The rebuilt 2004-2005 squad breezed through the Savage Cup tournament in Trail with a win over the East Kootenay Royals, as well as two victories over the host club. Awaiting the Regals in the next round, not the perennial Alberta Champion Stony Plain Eagles, but Theoren Fleury, Gino Odjick, and the Horse Lake Thunder. The visiting Regals, though, did not win a game in the best-of-five series.

The Powell River Regals Hockey Club hosted the Allan Cup for the third time in April 2006. The tournament has grown to include five regional champions along with the host club. The team started off the year with a pair of exhibition games at home versus the Victoria Salmon Kings of the East Coast Hockey League. The visitors won both games by scores of 7-3 and 6–2. The Regals then went seven wins to four losses the rest of their schedule.

Next up was a best-of-five series with the Trail Smoke Eaters for the provincial championship the Savage Cup. The teams split the first two games in Trail before the Regals captured their 12th BC title on home ice outscoring their opponent 42–13 in the four game series.

Next up was the Allan Cup. In their first game Powell River took on the Alberta Champion Fort Hotel Chiefs, defeating them 4–2. The final round robin game was against the Quebec Champion Shawinigan Extreme. With Shawinigan defeating the Chiefs 8-2 and the tie breaker being a goals for and against formula, the Regals needed to win to earn the bye to the semi-final. It was a tight battle for 60 minutes, each team scoring just once. The format called for a five-minute sudden victory overtime period after which, if there was no scoring, it would remain a tie and the Quebec champs would earn the automatic berth into the semi-final.The Regals pulled their goaltender with just over a minute remaining. Keeping the play in the zone the Extreme iced the puck, giving the Regals one last chance to score with 6.4 seconds remaining. The face-off ended up in the corner, and it looked to be over. But Jamie Leach dug the puck out and threw it into the high slot and onto the stick of Mike MacKay, whose one timer found the back of the net for the winner with just 1.7 seconds left. The Regals won the game 2-1 and had the bye.

The day off helped the hosts immensely. In their semi-final they faced the Trail Smokeaters for the first time since the Savage cup. The Regals handed them another lopsided defeat, this time 7–1. The final had the team taking on the two-time Allan Cup Champion Whitby Dunlops, and the Regals earned a 7–1 victory and their third Allan Cup in nine years.

The following season Hockey Canada once again rewarded the Regals for their Allan Cup victory by sending them to the IIHF sanctioned Polese Cup in Gomel, Belarus. Along with Canada the tournament included the Russian Super League's Salavat Yulaev and the National Teams from Latvia and Belarus. Although Canada lost all its games, they kept every game close until running out of gas in each of the third periods. Goaltender Chad Vizzutti internationally earned goaltender of the tournament honors. A month after representing their country the Regals hosted the Savage Cup. Also vying for the title were the Trail Smoke Eaters and the upstart Fort St John Flyers. The one-game final had the Regals taking on the Flyers. However, without their full lineup due to injuries and other commitments, the Regals lost the game.

The 2007–08 season had the Savage Cup hosted by the Flyers in Fort St John. It was a best of five between the Regals and Flyers. Once again. due to other commitments and injuries, the Regals were only able to bring 14 skaters. Due to strong goaltending from Chad Vizzutti and timely scoring the Regals took the first two games and were half a period away from taking back the Savage trophy, but with a lack of bodies and fatigue setting in the Regals lost game three. The Flyers took the final two games to retain the provincial crown and their second Savage Cup.

The Regals began rebuilding at the start of the 2008-09 campaign by returning full-time to the AA circuit and not icing a AAA squad for the first time since 1992-93. The club had operated separate AAA and AA clubs in 2002-2003. After qualifying for the Coy Cup in Terrace, BC, Regals went undefeated during the round-robin portion of the tournament and advanced directly to the final. A young Regals team almost pulled off an upset but fell to the Williams Lake Stampeders 5–4 in overtime. Of the game, veteran Scott Mastrodonato said, “It was a good lesson, whether it was a life lesson or a hockey lesson, you learn from your mistakes. “It was heartbreaking to lose the way we did,” he said, “but in some small way it was a good thing because since we didn’t win, we still have something to shoot for.” Mastrodonato then warned “that if they had won in their first year then everyone would have thought we’re good enough and the truth is, we’re not.”

One of the founding members of the Powell River Minor Hockey Association and a driving force in the creation of the Regals, Powell River's own Mr. Hockey, Hap Parker, died in September 2008, at the age of 94.

The 2023-24 season was the Powell River Regals first season back to competitive hockey. They played over 20 regular season games traveling all around BC, Alberta, and even had the opportunity to play a series in Jackson Hole, Wyoming. The team would then be the hosts for the 2023-24 season Coy Cup Championship. The team welcomed the Penticton Silver Bullets, Terrace River Kings, and the Williams Lake Stampeders to Powell River from March 26-30, 2024 for the Championship. The last time the Regals hosted the Coy Cup in 2010 they won on home ice. The Regals started off with a tie in their first round robin game against the Terrace River kings, ending 1-1 after two over-time periods. They were undefeated for the rest of the round robin portion. After winning 6-5 in the final round robin game against the Penticton Silver Bullets, the Regals made their way into the semi-finals. Powell River Regals opened the scoring of the game 2:11 when Ethan Schmunk set up Travis Granbois' first of two goals on the one night. Williams Lake didn't take long to respond taking the lead 2-1 later in the first period. The Stamps entered the third period with a 4-2 lead until Jack Long's one-timer (from Granbois and Riley Billy) on the power play point found the top corner of the net. The Stamps responded scoring a power play point of their own resulting in a 5-3 lead quieting the packed arena. Billy and Schmunk set up Granbois, whose shot found a spot in the net. Brett Kinley scored the goal to tie the game with 2:38 remaining in the game. Hometown skater, Hunter Findlater, scored the winning goal just over a minute later. The crowd went crazy. The Regals ended the game with a 6-5 win over Williams Lake Stampeders, making their way to the finals. Regals Head Coach and President Tod English called it a "heart and soul win."

The hometown team met the Terrace River Kings in the finals playing against each other for the second time this week. The Terrace River Kings had the bye into the finals which gave them a day off. The Hap Parker Arena was packed with more fans than ever before. The Regals had the upper hand for most of the match holding a 3-2 lead into the third period but Terrace scored to tie up the game. With less the 5 minutes on the clock the Regals took the lead again, but their momentum was broken by Terrace's fourth goal of the night. Finally, just over halfway through the third overtime, Carter Shanon found a spot in the net, earning the visiting team their first ever Coy Cup in history after Losing 7 times in the Coy Cup finals. The Powell River Regals played 5 games in 5 days and entered a 3rd overtime in the finals ending the championship with the silver medal.

After winning the McCallum Cup in 2024–25, the Regals joined the West Coast Senior Hockey League for the 2025–26 season. They repeated as McCallum Cup champions in March 2026, sweeping the Nanaimo Steelmen in the best-of-three final, and represented the league at the 2026 Coy Cup in Dawson Creek.
