= Minnesota Mr. Hockey Award =

American ice hockey award

The following is a list of ice hockey players who have been selected over the years to receive the Minnesota Minute Men Mr. Hockey Award as the most outstanding senior high school hockey player in the state of Minnesota. The recipients are reviewed and selected by a group of National Hockey League scouts, Division I & III coaches and USHL scouts.

== Mr. Hockey award winners ==
Year	Recipient	School
2026	Tyden Bergeson	Moorhead
2025	Mason Kraft	Moorhead
2024	Hagen Burrows	Minnetonka
2023	Jayson Shaugabay	Warroad
2022	Max Strand	Roseau
2021	Jack Peart	Grand Rapids
2020	Blake Biondi	Hermantown
2019	Bryce Brodzinski	Blaine
2018	Sammy Walker	Edina
2017	Casey Mittelstadt	Eden Prairie
2016	Riley Tufte	Blaine
2015	Jake Jaremko	Elk River
2014	Avery Peterson; Hunter Shepard	Grand Rapids
2013	Grant Besse	Benilde-St. Margaret's
2012	Justin Kloos	Lakeville South
2011	Kyle Rau	Eden Prairie
2010	Nick Bjugstad	Blaine
2009	Nick Leddy	Eden Prairie
2008	Aaron Ness	Roseau
2007	Ryan McDonagh	Cretin-Derham Hall
2006	David Fischer	Apple Valley
2005	Brian Lee	Moorhead
2004	Tom Gorowsky	Centennial (Blaine)
2003	Nate Dey	North (North St. Paul)
2002	Gino Guyer	Greenway (Coleraine)
2001	Marty Sertich	Roseville
2000	Paul Martin	Elk River
1999	Jeff Taffe	Hastings
1998	Johnny Pohl	Red Wing
1997	Aaron Miskovich	Grand Rapids
1996	Dave Spehar	Duluth East
1995	Erik Rasmussen	St. Louis Park
1994	Mike Crowley	Bloomington Jefferson
1993	Nick Checco	Bloomington Jefferson
1992	Brian Bonin	White Bear Lake
1991	Darby Hendrickson	Richfield
1990	Joe Dziedzic	Edison
1989	Trent Klatt	Osseo
1988	Larry Olimb	Warroad
1987	Kris Miller	Greenway (Coleraine)
1986	George Pelawa	Bemidji
1985	Tom Chorske	Southwest
