= Nick Bjugstad =

American ice hockey player (born 1992)

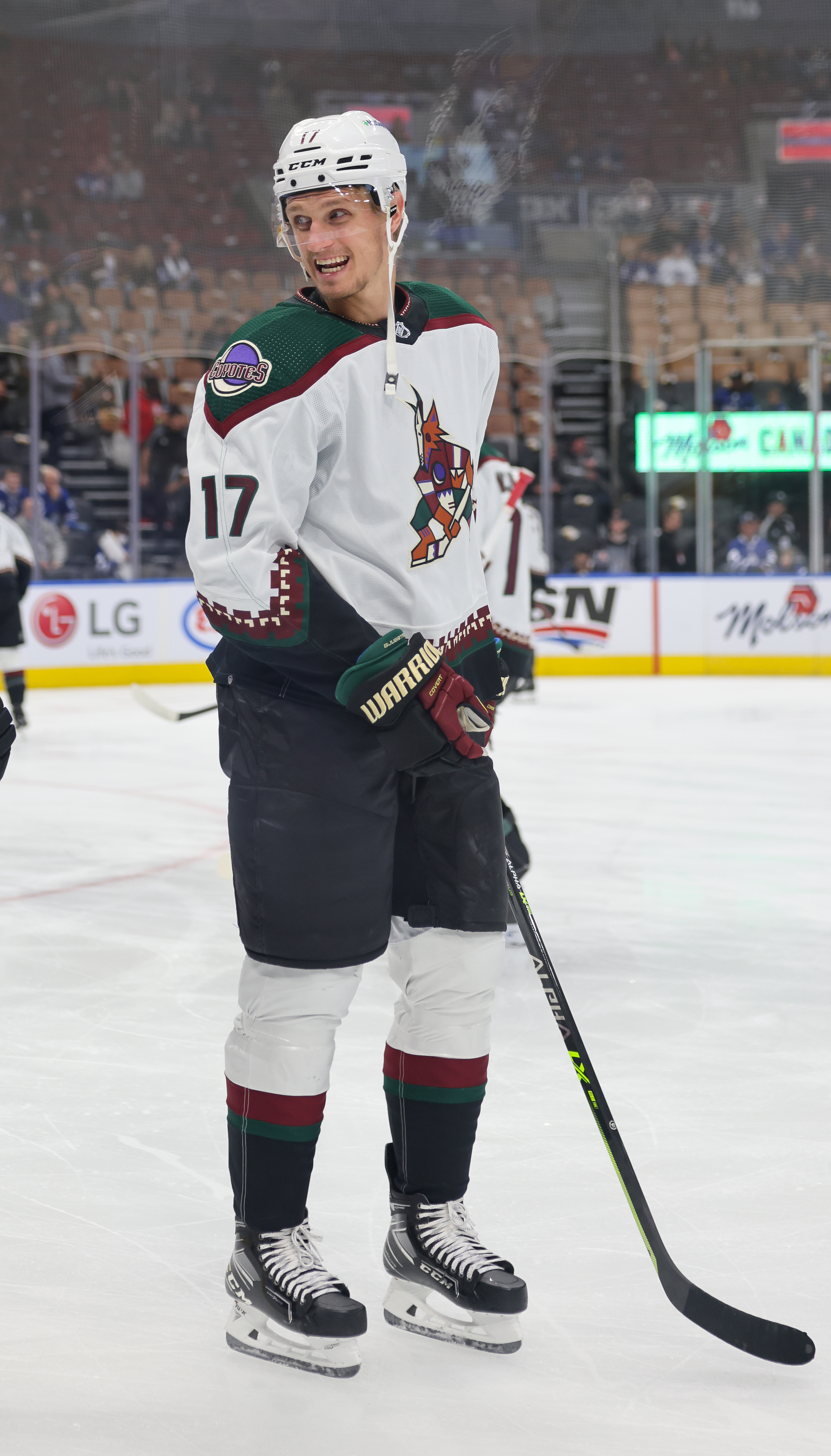
- Bjugstad with the Arizona Coyotes in 2022
- Born: July 17, 1992 (age 34) Blaine, Minnesota, U.S.
- Height: 6 ft 6 in (198 cm)
- Weight: 218 lb (99 kg; 15 st 8 lb)
- Position: Forward
- Shoots: Right
- NHL team Former teams: Winnipeg Jets; Florida Panthers; Pittsburgh Penguins; Minnesota Wild; Arizona Coyotes; Edmonton Oilers; Utah Hockey Club; St. Louis Blues; New Jersey Devils
- National team: United States
- NHL draft: 19th overall, 2010; Florida Panthers
- Playing career: 2013–present

Nicholas Jay Bjugstad (/ˈbjuːɡstæd/ BEWG-stad; born July 17, 1992) is an American professional ice hockey player who is a forward for the Winnipeg Jets of the National Hockey League (NHL). He was selected by the Florida Panthers in the first round (19th overall) of the 2010 NHL entry draft.

== Playing career ==
=== Amateur ===
During the summer of 2008, Bjugstad turned down an invitation to train with the USA Hockey National Team Development Program out of a sense of loyalty to his high school teammates. Bjugstad finished his high school career with Blaine High School in 2010 after helping to bring the school to three consecutive Minnesota State High School Hockey Tournaments. He was named Mr. Hockey in 2009–10. While in high school, Bjugstad accelerated his schooling by taking summer classes and online courses, enabling him to graduate a year earlier than expected.

Bjugstad began his collegiate career at the University of Minnesota in 2010 playing for the Golden Gophers, where he totaled 54 goals and 44 assists during his three years while the team won two WCHA championships.

=== Professional ===
==== Florida Panthers ====
Bjugstad left the Gophers after his junior season, signing a three-year entry-level deal with the Florida Panthers on April 3, 2013. He immediately joined the last-placed Panthers to end the 2012–13 season, and scored his first NHL goal against Anders Lindbäck in Florida's season finale victory over the Tampa Bay Lightning on April 27, 2013. Bjugstad led the Panthers in points with 38, and third in goals with 16, during 2013–14, his first full-length season in the NHL, where he spent the majority of the season on the team's first line. On December 31, 2014, Bjugstad signed a six-year contract extension with the Panthers worth $24.6 million.

Bjugstad's 2016–17 season was riddled with injuries including a broken hand, and a lower body injury that contributed to him setting a new career low in points since his rookie year.

Bjugstad rebounded from his disappointing previous season by setting career highs in points, assists, and games played during his 2017–18 campaign. Bjugstad recorded his first career hat trick in the NHL on March 6, 2018 against the Tampa Bay Lightning.

==== Pittsburgh Penguins ====
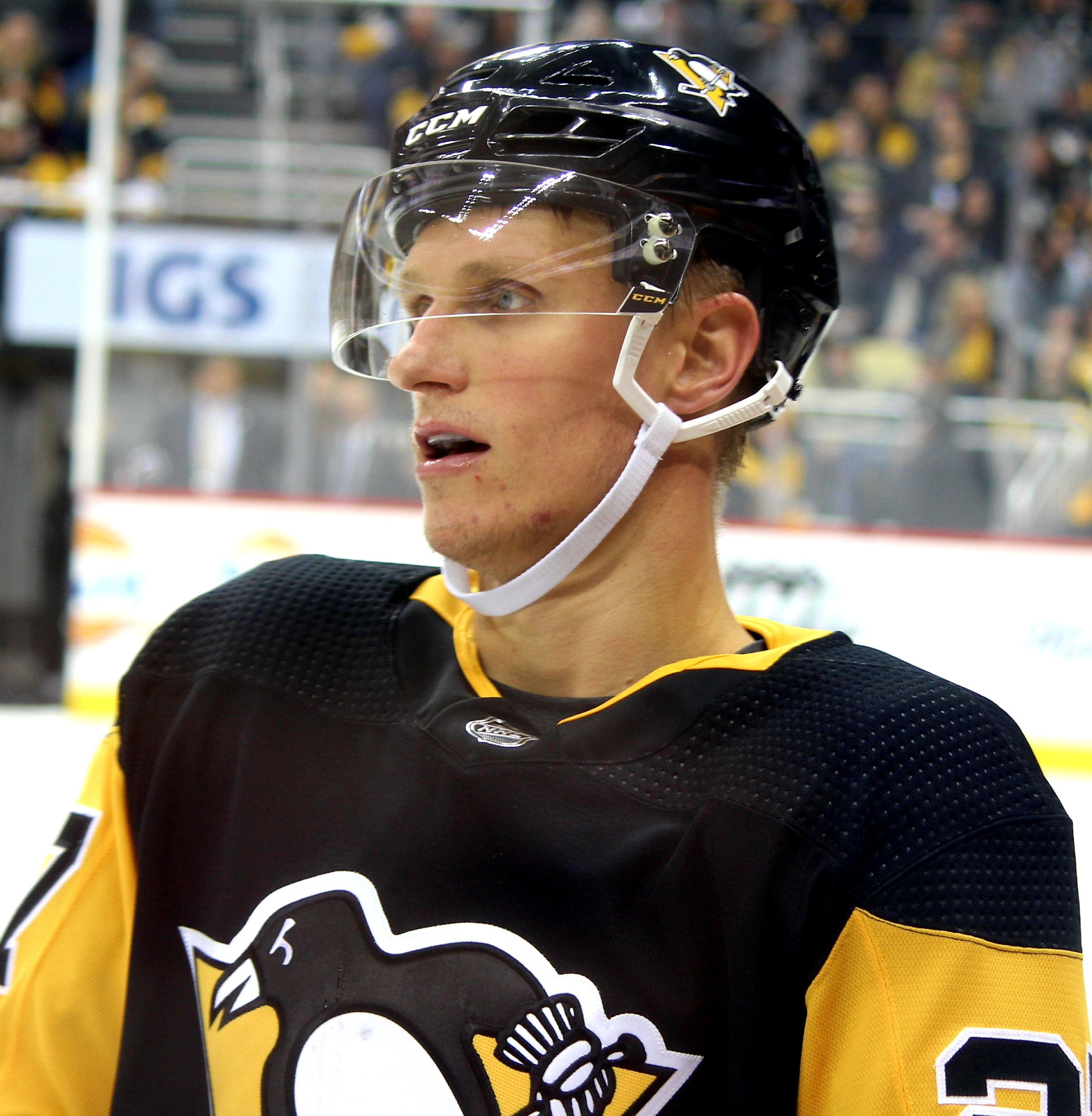
Bjugstad during his tenure with the Penguins.

On February 1, 2019, Bjugstad and teammate Jared McCann were traded to the Pittsburgh Penguins in exchange for Derick Brassard, Riley Sheahan, a 2nd round pick, and two 4th round picks in the 2019 NHL entry draft. Upon joining the team, Bjugstad immediately settled into the third-line center role. He remained in this role as the Penguins qualified for the 2019 Stanley Cup playoffs. In Game 1, Bjugstad led the team with eight hits although they fell 4–3 in overtime to the New York Islanders. Bjugstad had limited impact for the Penguins in the playoffs as he tallied no points and two penalty minutes over four games.

Bjugstad returned to the Penguins for the 2019–20 season but was limited to only 13 games. After suffering a core-muscle injury in October, he was expected to miss at least eight weeks to recover from surgery. He was out of the lineup from the end of November to early March before returning on March 5. In his return, Bjugstad recorded an assist on Hornqvist's first goal of the game to lift the Penguins 4–2 over the Buffalo Sabres. He played in three games for the Penguins before suffering an unrelated lower-body injury on March 8. When the NHL returned for the 2020 Stanley Cup playoffs, Bjugstad was ruled out for the remainder of the season.

==== Minnesota Wild ====
On September 11, 2020, Bjugstad was traded to the Minnesota Wild in exchange for a conditional pick in the 2021 NHL entry draft. In the pandemic-delayed 2020–21 season, Bjugstad recorded six goals and 17 points in 44 games.

As a pending unrestricted free agent, Bjugstad opted to remain with the Wild in signing a one-year, $900,000 contract extension on July 5, 2021.

==== Arizona Coyotes ====
On July 13, 2022, Bjugstad signed a one-year, $900,000 contract with the Arizona Coyotes.

==== Edmonton Oilers ====
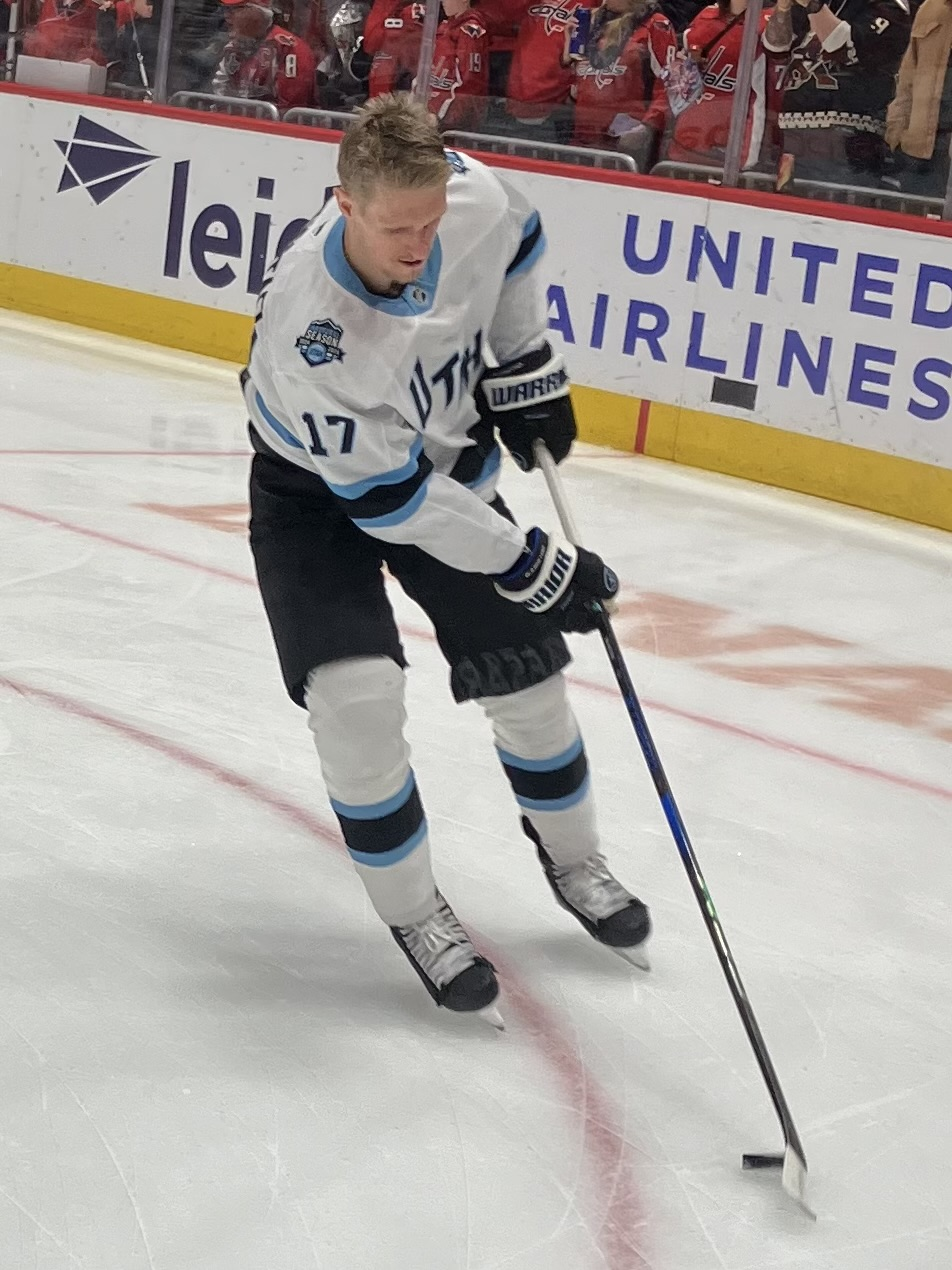
Bjugstad with the Utah Hockey Club in 2025.

On March 2, 2023, the Coyotes traded Bjugstad along with Cam Dineen to the Edmonton Oilers in exchange for a third-round pick in 2023, and prospect Michael Kesselring with Arizona retaining half of Bjugstad's salary. Bjugstad made an immediate impact to the Oilers bottom six forward group, contributing with 4 goals and 6 points through 19 regular season games. He collected a career best three postseason goals through 12 playoff games, before the Oilers were defeated in the second round to the eventual Stanley Cup Champions, the Vegas Golden Knights.

==== Return to Arizona, move to Utah ====
As a free agent from the Oilers, Bjugstad opted to return to former club, the Arizona Coyotes, in agreeing to a two-year, $4.2 million contract on July 1, 2023. At the end of the 2023–24 season, the Coyotes' franchise was suspended and team assets were subsequently transferred to the expansion Utah Hockey Club; as a result, Bjugstad became a member of the Utah team.

==== St. Louis Blues ====
Bjugstad signed as a free agent to a two-year, $1.75 million contract with the St. Louis Blues on July 1, 2025.

==== New Jersey Devils ====
On February 4, 2026, Bjugstad was traded to the New Jersey Devils, in exchange for Thomas Bordeleau and a conditional 2026 fourth-round pick.

==== Winnipeg Jets ====
On October 23, 2026, Bjugstad was traded to the Winnipeg Jets as part of a deal for Connor Hellebuyck.

== Personal life ==
Bjugstad's father, Mike, played Division-III hockey at the University of Wisconsin–Eau Claire, while his uncle, Scott, played at the University of Minnesota before going on to play in the NHL, where he spent a portion of his professional career with the Minnesota North Stars. Scott and Nick have both played for the Pittsburgh Penguins; Scott played 24 games with the team during the 1988–89 season and scored three goals.

During the 2013–14 season, Bjugstad finished his class work to graduate with a degree in Business Marketing from the University of Minnesota. Bjugstad and his wife Jackie, a kindergarten teacher, have one child together.

Bjugstad is nicknamed “Rotisserie Chicken” after he skipped dinner with his Panthers teammates and opted to purchase rotisserie chicken at Publix instead. Amused fans would often throw chicken wings onto the ice as a result.

== Career statistics ==
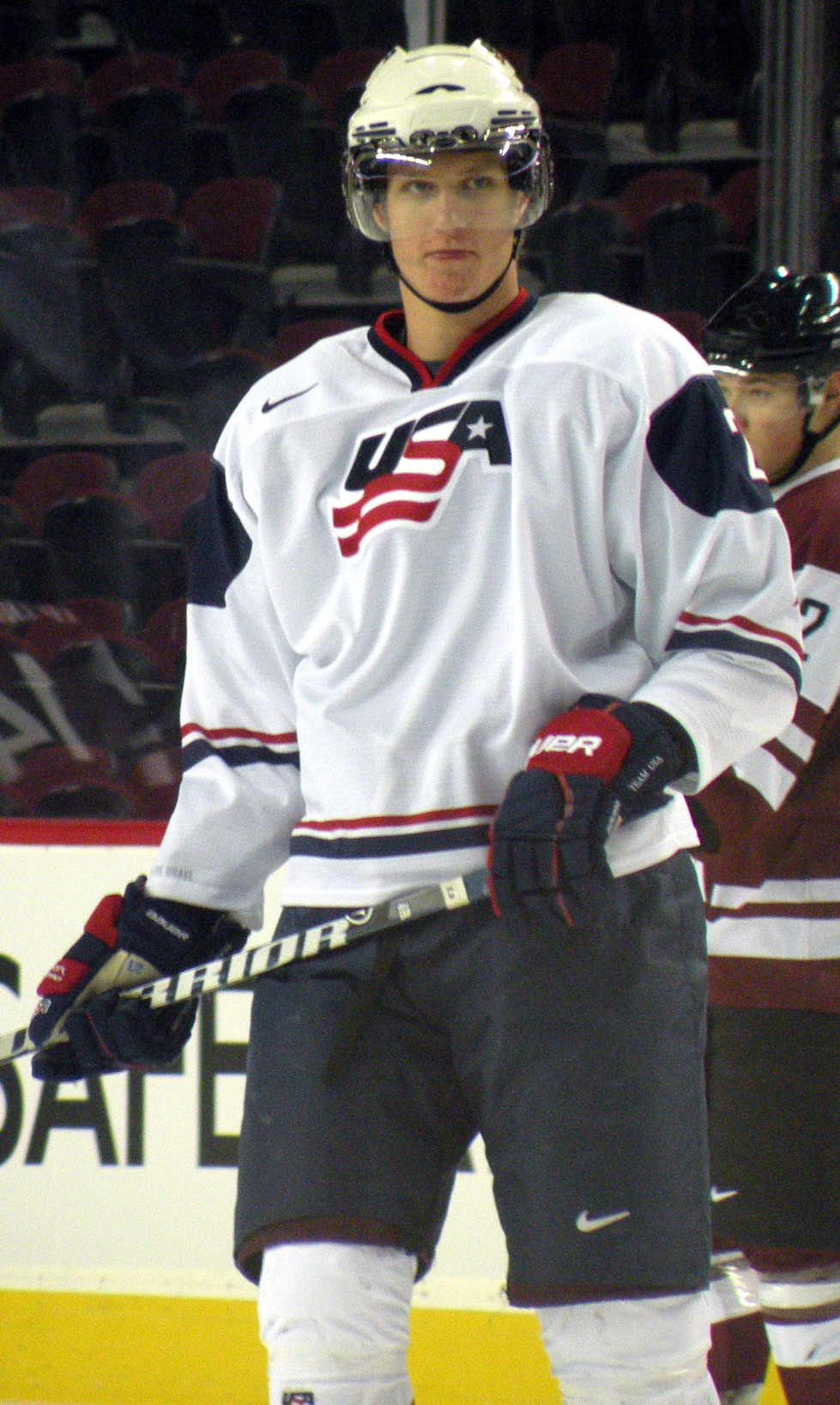
- Bjugstad at the 2012 World Junior Championships

Medal record

Men's ice hockey

Representing the United States

World Championships
Bronze medal – third place	2013 Sweden/Finland	

World Junior Championships
Bronze medal – third place	2011 USA	

=== Regular season and playoffs ===
			Regular season					Playoffs
Season	Team	League	GP	G	A	Pts	PIM	GP	G	A	Pts	PIM
2007–08	Blaine High School	MNHS	16	10	17	27	—	—	—	—	—	—
2008–09	Blaine High School	MNHS	25	26	25	51	20	—	—	—	—	—
2009–10	Blaine High School	MNHS	25	29	31	60	24	5	6	3	9	2
2010–11	University of Minnesota	WCHA	29	8	12	20	51	—	—	—	—	—
2011–12	University of Minnesota	WCHA	40	25	17	42	28	—	—	—	—	—
2012–13	University of Minnesota	WCHA	40	21	15	36	28	—	—	—	—	—
2012–13	Florida Panthers	NHL	11	1	0	1	2	—	—	—	—	—
2013–14	Florida Panthers	NHL	76	16	22	38	16	—	—	—	—	—
2014–15	Florida Panthers	NHL	72	24	19	43	38	—	—	—	—	—
2015–16	Florida Panthers	NHL	67	15	19	34	41	5	2	2	4	2
2016–17	Florida Panthers	NHL	54	7	7	14	22	—	—	—	—	—
2017–18	Florida Panthers	NHL	82	19	30	49	41	—	—	—	—	—
2018–19	Florida Panthers	NHL	32	5	7	12	16	—	—	—	—	—
2018–19	Pittsburgh Penguins	NHL	32	9	5	14	14	4	0	0	0	2
2019–20	Pittsburgh Penguins	NHL	13	1	1	2	8	—	—	—	—	—
2020–21	Minnesota Wild	NHL	44	6	11	17	17	6	1	0	1	2
2021–22	Minnesota Wild	NHL	57	7	6	13	20	—	—	—	—	—
2022–23	Arizona Coyotes	NHL	59	13	10	23	26	—	—	—	—	—
2022–23	Edmonton Oilers	NHL	19	4	2	6	8	12	3	0	3	16
2023–24	Arizona Coyotes	NHL	76	22	23	45	59	—	—	—	—	—
2024–25	Utah Hockey Club	NHL	66	8	11	19	16	—	—	—	—	—
2025–26	St. Louis Blues	NHL	35	6	1	7	25	—	—	—	—	—
2025–26	New Jersey Devils	NHL	26	0	2	2	8	—	—	—	—	—
NHL totals			821	163	176	339	377	27	6	2	8	22

=== International ===
Year	Team	Event	Result	GP	G	A	Pts	PIM
2011	United States	WJC	3rd place, bronze medalist(s)	6	2	2	4	0
2012	United States	WJC	7th	6	4	2	6	0
2013	United States	WC	3rd place, bronze medalist(s)	10	0	2	2	0
2017	United States	WC	5th	8	1	3	4	4
Junior totals				12	6	4	10	0
Senior totals				18	1	5	6	4

== Awards and honors ==
Award	Year	Ref
High school
Minnesota Mr. Hockey	2009–10	
College
All-WCHA First Team	2011–12	
AHCA West Second-Team All-American	2011–12	
All-WCHA Third Team	2012–13	

Awards and achievements
Preceded by Nick Leddy	Minnesota Mr. Hockey; 2009–10	Succeeded by Kyle Rau
Preceded by Erik Gudbranson	Florida Panthers first-round draft pick 2010	Succeeded by Quinton Howden
