= Jeff Taffe =

American ice hockey player (born 1981)

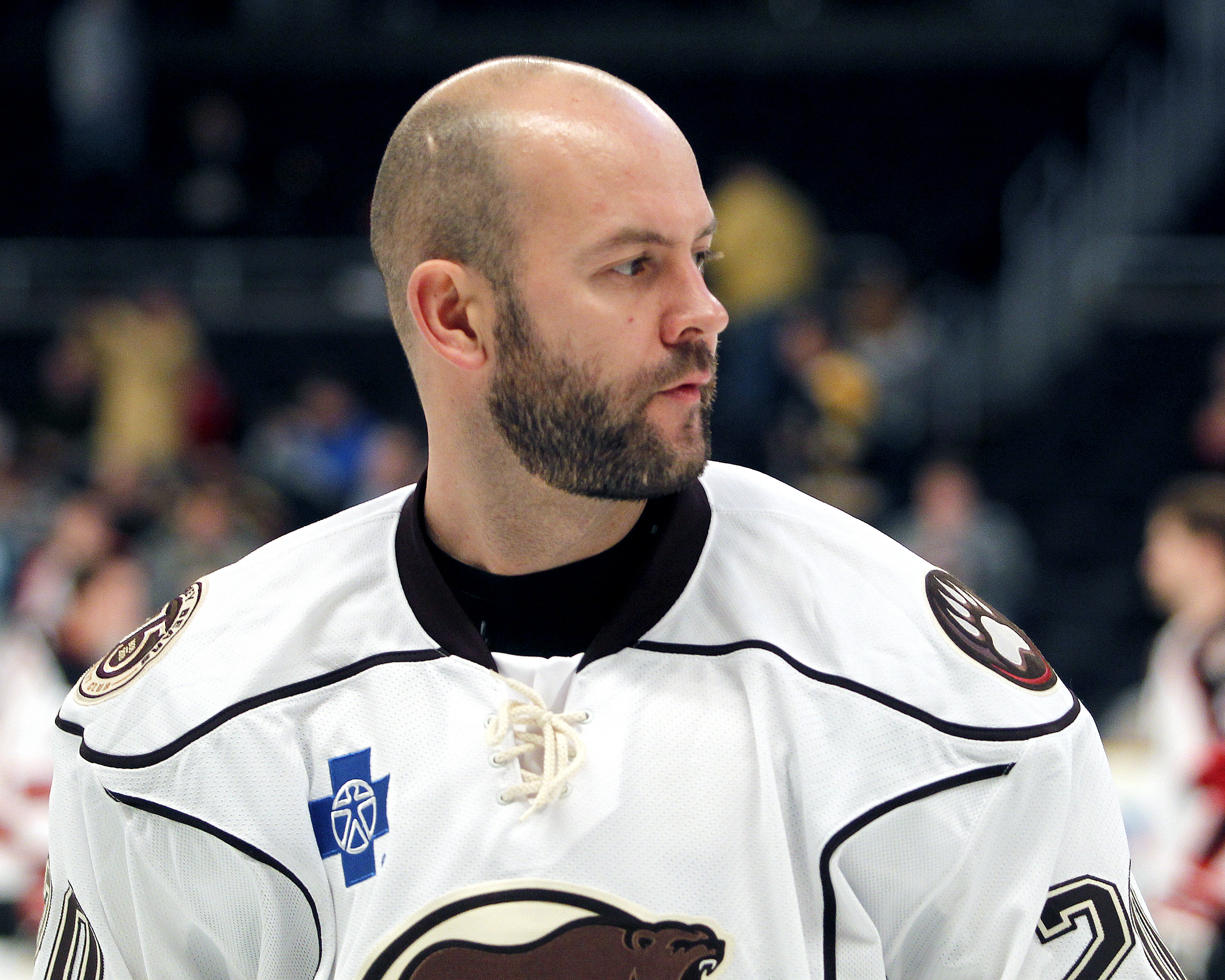
- Born: February 19, 1981 (age 45) Hastings, Minnesota, U.S.
- Height: 6 ft 3 in (191 cm)
- Weight: 207 lb (94 kg; 14 st 11 lb)
- Position: Center
- Shot: Left
- Played for: Phoenix Coyotes; New York Rangers; Pittsburgh Penguins; Florida Panthers; Chicago Blackhawks; Minnesota Wild; Linköpings HC; Neftekhimik Nizhnekamsk; HC Ambrì-Piotta; HC Slovan Bratislava
- NHL draft: 30th overall, 2000; St. Louis Blues
- Playing career: 2002–2019

Jeffrey Charles Taffe (born February 19, 1981) is an American former professional ice hockey center. Taffe was drafted in the first round, 30th overall, by the St. Louis Blues in the 2000 NHL entry draft.

== Playing career ==
After playing three seasons with the University of Minnesota, during which the Blues traded his rights to the Phoenix Coyotes in a deal involving Keith Tkachuk, Taffe made his professional debut with Coyotes' American Hockey League affiliate, the Springfield Falcons, in the 2002–03 season. He also appeared in 20 NHL games with the Coyotes that same season, scoring three goals.

Taffe spent the 2004-05 season as a member of the American Hockey League's Utah Grizzlies. On November 28, 2004, Taffe was involved in an on-ice incident where he elbowed Houston Aeros goalie Josh Harding in the back of Harding's neck, resulting in a grade two concussion to Harding. Taffe was suspended for four games by the league.

Taffe appeared in 82 games over parts of three seasons with the Coyotes before being traded to the New York Rangers in exchange for Jamie Lundmark during the 2005–06 season. He appeared in two games with the Rangers, before being traded back to Phoenix later in the season in exchange for Martin Sonnenberg.

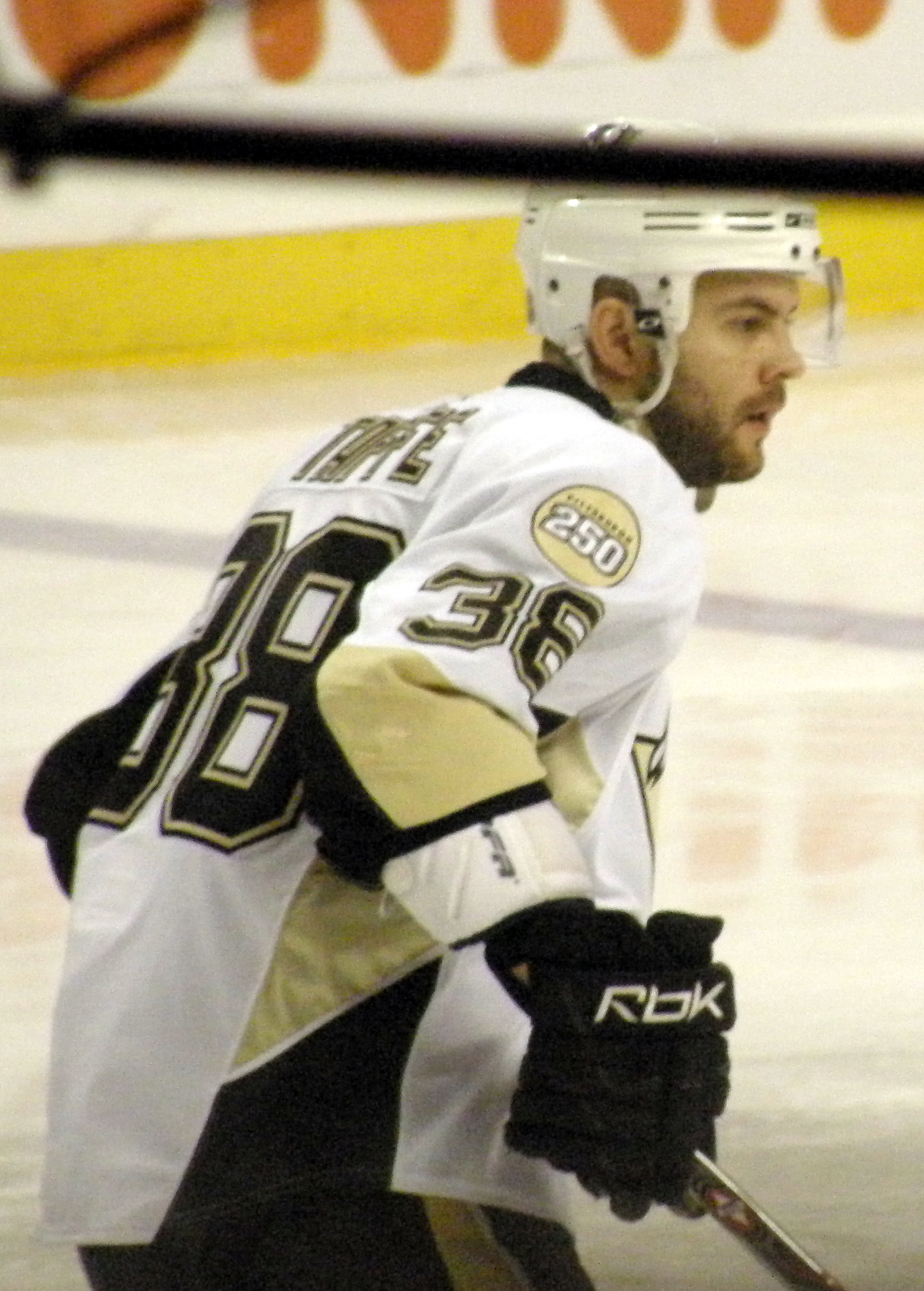
Taffe playing for the Penguins in 2008.

On July 13, 2007, Taffe signed a one-year contract with the Pittsburgh Penguins. After beginning the 2007–08 with the Wilkes-Barre/Scranton Penguins, Taffe was recalled to Pittsburgh and found a checking role on the fourth line. He remained on the team as a healthy scratch in the playoffs that year as Adam Hall was favored to fill Taffe's fourth line position.

After re-signing with the Penguins, Taffe played a handful of games with Pittsburgh during the 2008–09 season mainly playing in Wilkes-Barre. After Wilkes-Barre was eliminated from the AHL playoffs, Taffe was recalled for the Pittsburgh Penguins playoff run and eventual 2009 Stanley Cup Championship. He was on the practice squad but did not play in any games and so he did not qualify to be included on the Stanley. However, Taffe and a number of other Wilkes-Barre players and healthy scratches took part in the on-ice celebration and team photo. Taffe was also awarded a Stanley Cup Ring.

Taffe then signed a two-year, two-way deal with the Florida Panthers on July 3, 2009. At this point Taffe started to play very few NHL games and mostly played in the American Hockey League, receiving very few call-ups.

The Florida Panthers traded Jeff Taffe to the Chicago Blackhawks for Marty Reasoner on July 22, 2010. Taffe was assigned to Chicago's AHL affiliate, the Rockford IceHogs shortly before the 2010–11 season began. His only game with the Blackhawks came on February 12, 2011, in a 3–2 SO loss to the Phoenix Coyotes playing on the fourth line with Viktor Stålberg and John Scott and going pointless as he was recalled to play in the game due to center Jake Dowell being a last minute scratch due to flu-like symptoms and center Ryan Johnson due to an injury suffered in the previous game the previous day in the Hawks 4–3 SO loss to the Dallas Stars.

On July 3, 2011, Taffe signed a two-way contract with the Minnesota Wild. Taffe was familiarly assigned to the AHL, with affiliate the Houston Aeros. Through the duration of the 2011–12 season, Taffe was recalled by the Wild and appeared as a depth player in five games.

On July 2, 2012, Unable to earn an NHL contract due to the lockout, Taffe signed a one-year contract with the Hershey Bears of the AHL. During the 2012–13 season, Taffe led the Bears in scoring with 71 points in 73 games, for second overall in the AHL. In the penultimate regular season game, Taffe recorded his league leading 53rd assist in a 4-2 defeat to the Binghamton Senators for his 500th AHL point, on April 20, 2013. He was selected to the AHL Second All-Star Team at years end.

After 10 seasons of playing professionally in North America, Taffe signed his first contract abroad on a two-year deal with Swedish club Linköpings HC of the Swedish Hockey League on May 17, 2013. However just under two weeks later, citing personal reasons, Taffe was granted a release from his contract with Linköpings to remain in North America. With an amicable departure, Linköpings left the possibility open for a return at season's end.

With an additional year spent with the Hershey Bears and unable to reach the playoffs in the 2013–14 season, Taffe agreed to return to Linköpings and embark on his European career, signing a one-year contract on July 22, 2014. In the 2014–15 season, Taffe lived up to expectations, quickly adapted to produce at an elite rate of 59 points in only 54 games.

On April 7, 2015, Taffe left Sweden after the season to sign a lucrative one-year deal with Russian club, HC Neftekhimik Nizhnekamsk of the KHL. He returned for a second season in the KHL with HC Slovan Bratislava before continuing his journeyman career in signing a one-year contract with HC Ambrì-Piotta in the Swiss National League in August 2017.

As a free agent in the following off-season, Taffe opted to return to former club, HC Slovan Bratislava, in agreeing to a one-year deal on August 22, 2018.

== Career statistics ==
=== Regular season and playoffs ===
			Regular season					Playoffs
Season	Team	League	GP	G	A	Pts	PIM	GP	G	A	Pts	PIM
1996–97	Hastings High School	HS–MN	25	21	37	58		—	—	—	—	—
1997–98	Hastings High School	HS–MN	28	37	29	66		—	—	—	—	—
1998–99	Hastings High School	HS–MN	28	39	51	90		—	—	—	—	—
1998–99	Rochester Mustangs	USHL	17	12	9	21	26	—	—	—	—	—
1999–2000	University of Minnesota	WCHA	39	10	10	20	22	—	—	—	—	—
2000–01	University of Minnesota	WCHA	38	12	23	35	56	—	—	—	—	—
2001–02	University of Minnesota	WCHA	43	34	24	58	86	—	—	—	—	—
2002–03	Springfield Falcons	AHL	57	23	26	49	44	5	0	3	3	8
2002–03	Phoenix Coyotes	NHL	20	3	1	4	4	—	—	—	—	—
2003–04	Springfield Falcons	AHL	15	10	6	16	19	—	—	—	—	—
2003–04	Phoenix Coyotes	NHL	59	8	10	18	20	—	—	—	—	—
2004–05	Utah Grizzlies	AHL	27	9	10	19	35	—	—	—	—	—
2005–06	Phoenix Coyotes	NHL	2	0	0	0	0	—	—	—	—	—
2005–06	New York Rangers	NHL	2	0	0	0	0	—	—	—	—	—
2005–06	Hartford Wolf Pack	AHL	36	6	16	22	34	—	—	—	—	—
2005–06	San Antonio Rampage	AHL	33	5	6	11	29	—	—	—	—	—
2006–07	San Antonio Rampage	AHL	59	20	20	40	22	—	—	—	—	—
2006–07	Phoenix Coyotes	NHL	17	4	2	6	2	—	—	—	—	—
2007–08	Wilkes–Barre/Scranton Penguins	AHL	27	11	10	21	22	—	—	—	—	—
2007–08	Pittsburgh Penguins	NHL	45	5	7	12	8	—	—	—	—	—
2008–09	Wilkes–Barre/Scranton Penguins	AHL	74	25	50	75	65	12	5	6	11	22
2008–09	Pittsburgh Penguins	NHL	8	0	2	2	2	—	—	—	—	—
2009–10	Rochester Americans	AHL	61	28	28	56	47	7	1	6	7	9
2009–10	Florida Panthers	NHL	21	1	1	2	4	—	—	—	—	—
2010–11	Rockford IceHogs	AHL	74	30	37	67	22	—	—	—	—	—
2010–11	Chicago Blackhawks	NHL	1	0	0	0	0	—	—	—	—	—
2011–12	Houston Aeros	AHL	70	18	35	53	16	4	0	0	0	0
2011–12	Minnesota Wild	NHL	5	0	2	2	0	—	—	—	—	—
2012–13	Hershey Bears	AHL	73	18	53	71	27	5	0	4	4	2
2013–14	Hershey Bears	AHL	75	21	26	47	23	—	—	—	—	—
2014–15	Linköpings HC	SHL	54	18	41	59	43	11	1	3	4	2
2015–16	Neftekhimik Nizhnekamsk	KHL	56	12	14	26	18	4	1	0	1	0
2016–17	HC Slovan Bratislava	KHL	58	18	24	42	60	—	—	—	—	—
2017–18	HC Ambrì–Piotta	NL	32	4	15	19	12	—	—	—	—	—
2018–19	HC Slovan Bratislava	KHL	62	12	19	31	18	—	—	—	—	—
2022	Team Fuhr	3ICE	10	2	2	4	—	—	—	—	—	—
AHL totals			681	224	323	547	405	33	6	19	25	41
NHL totals			180	21	25	46	40	—	—	—	—	—

=== International ===
Year	Team	Event	Result	GP	G	A	Pts	PIM
1999	United States	WJC18	7th	6	3	2	5	29
2000	United States	WJC	4th	7	1	4	5	2
2001	United States	WJC	5th	7	6	2	8	6
Junior totals				20	10	8	18	37

== Awards and honors ==
Award	Year
USHS
Minnesota Mr. Hockey	1999
College
WCHA Third Team	2002
AHL
Second All-Star Team	2013

Awards and achievements
Preceded by Johnny Pohl	Minnesota Mr. Hockey; 1998–99 season	Succeeded by Paul Martin
Preceded by Barret Jackman	St. Louis Blues first-round draft pick 2000	Succeeded by Shawn Belle
