= Ryan McDonagh =

American ice hockey player (born 1989)

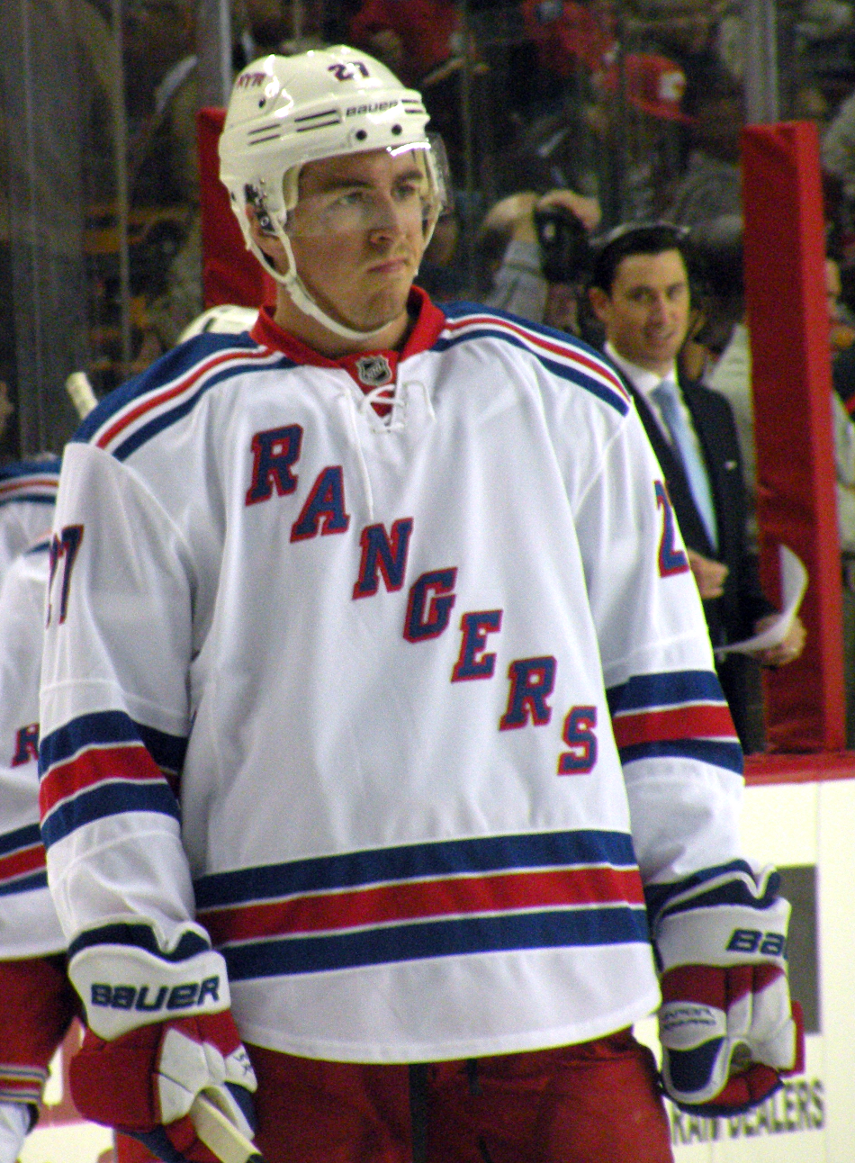
- McDonagh with the New York Rangers in October 2011
- Born: June 13, 1989 (age 37) Saint Paul, Minnesota, U.S.
- Height: 6 ft 1 in (185 cm)
- Weight: 213 lb (97 kg; 15 st 3 lb)
- Position: Defense
- Shoots: Left
- NHL team Former teams: Tampa Bay Lightning; New York Rangers; Barys Astana; Nashville Predators
- National team: United States
- NHL draft: 12th overall, 2007; Montreal Canadiens
- Playing career: 2010–present

Ryan Patrick McDonagh (born June 13, 1989) is an American professional ice hockey player who is a defenseman and alternate captain for the Tampa Bay Lightning of the National Hockey League (NHL). Drafted in the first round, 12th overall, by the Montreal Canadiens in 2007, he played college ice hockey for the University of Wisconsin–Madison. He also played for the New York Rangers, for whom he served as team captain from October 2014 until being traded to the Lightning in 2018. McDonagh won back-to-back Stanley Cups with the Lightning in 2020 and 2021, before spending two seasons with the Nashville Predators.

McDonagh also competes internationally for the United States and was a member of the men's ice hockey team at the 2014 Winter Olympics in Sochi.

== Playing career ==
=== Amateur ===
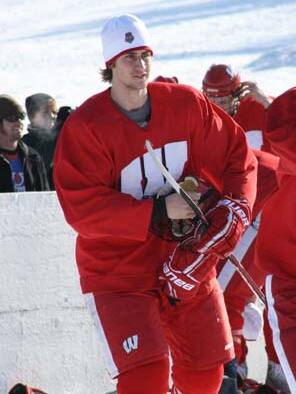
McDonagh with the Badgers in January 2010

McDonagh attended Cretin-Derham Hall High School in Saint Paul, Minnesota, where as a junior, he helped lead his team to the school's first state hockey championship. The following season, he was awarded the 2007 Minnesota Mr. Hockey award, which is given annually to the top senior high school hockey player in the state.

McDonagh was then drafted in the first round, 12th overall, by the Montreal Canadiens on June 22, 2007, in the 2007 NHL entry draft. He also won a silver medal with the United States at the 2007 IIHF World U18 Championships.

Two years later, McDonagh represented the Americans at the 2009 World Junior Ice Hockey Championships.

On June 30, 2009, McDonagh was traded (along with Chris Higgins, Pavel Valentenko and Doug Janik) to the New York Rangers in exchange for Scott Gomez, Tom Pyatt and Michael Busto.

=== Professional ===
==== New York Rangers (2010–2018) ====
On July 6, 2010, McDonagh signed an entry-level contract with the Rangers, forgoing his senior season at Wisconsin and joining childhood friend and former Wisconsin teammate Derek Stepan in New York.

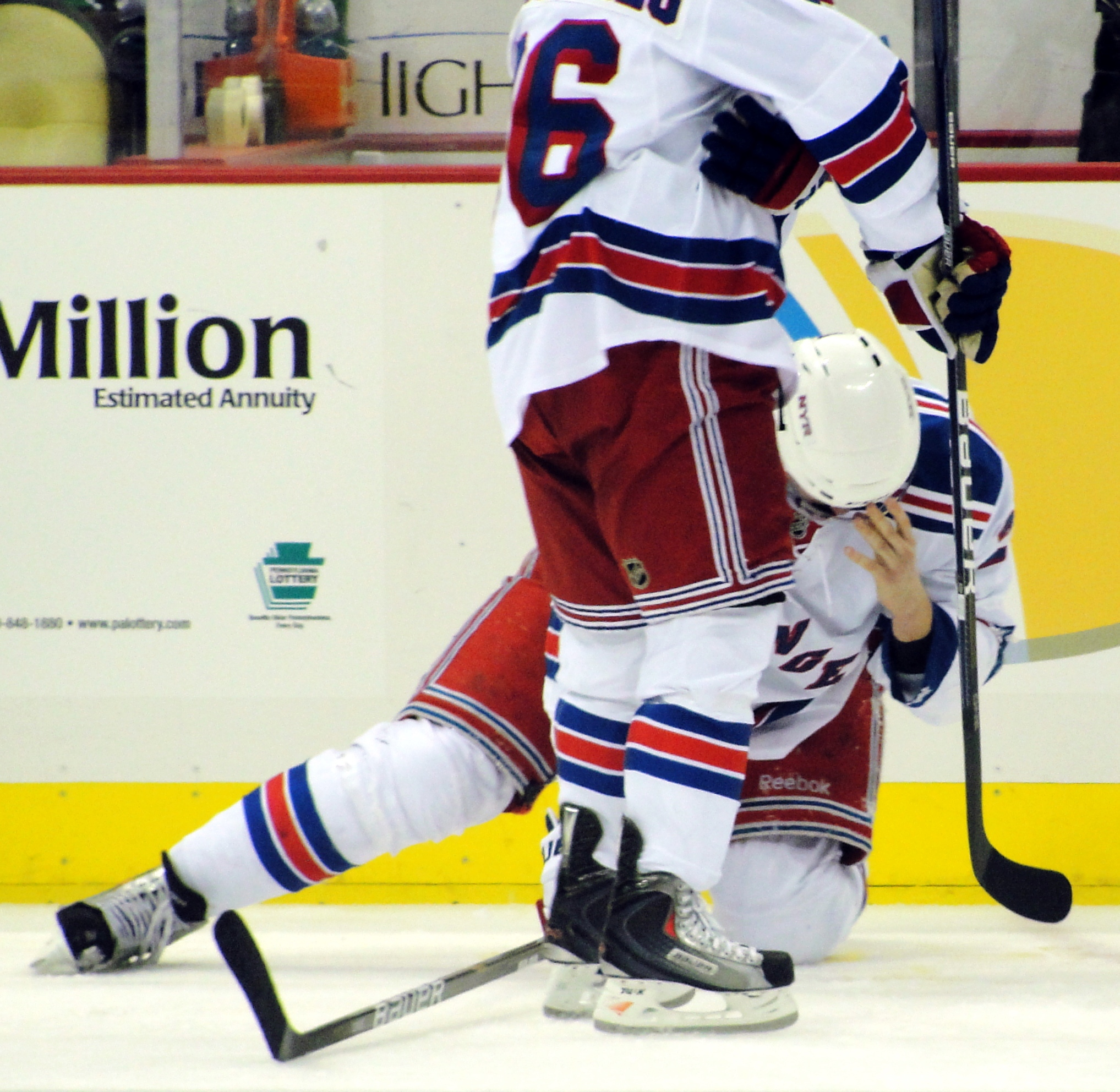
McDonagh in March 2011 slow to get up following an elbow to the head delivered by Penguins' Matt Cooke. Cooke was later suspended for 17 games.

After beginning the 2010–11 season with the Rangers' American Hockey League (AHL) affiliate, the Hartford Wolf Pack, he was promoted to the Rangers on January 3, 2011. He played his first career NHL game on January 7, 2011, against the Dallas Stars. He then earned his first NHL point on an assist of a Brandon Prust goal against the Carolina Hurricanes on January 20. On March 20, McDonagh was the victim of an elbow to the head from Pittsburgh Penguins forward Matt Cooke, who was subsequently suspended for the remainder of the regular season and the first round of the 2011 Stanley Cup playoffs.

On April 9, 2011, McDonagh scored the game-winning goal, the first of his career, against the New Jersey Devils, earning the Rangers the eighth and final playoff spot in the Eastern Conference.

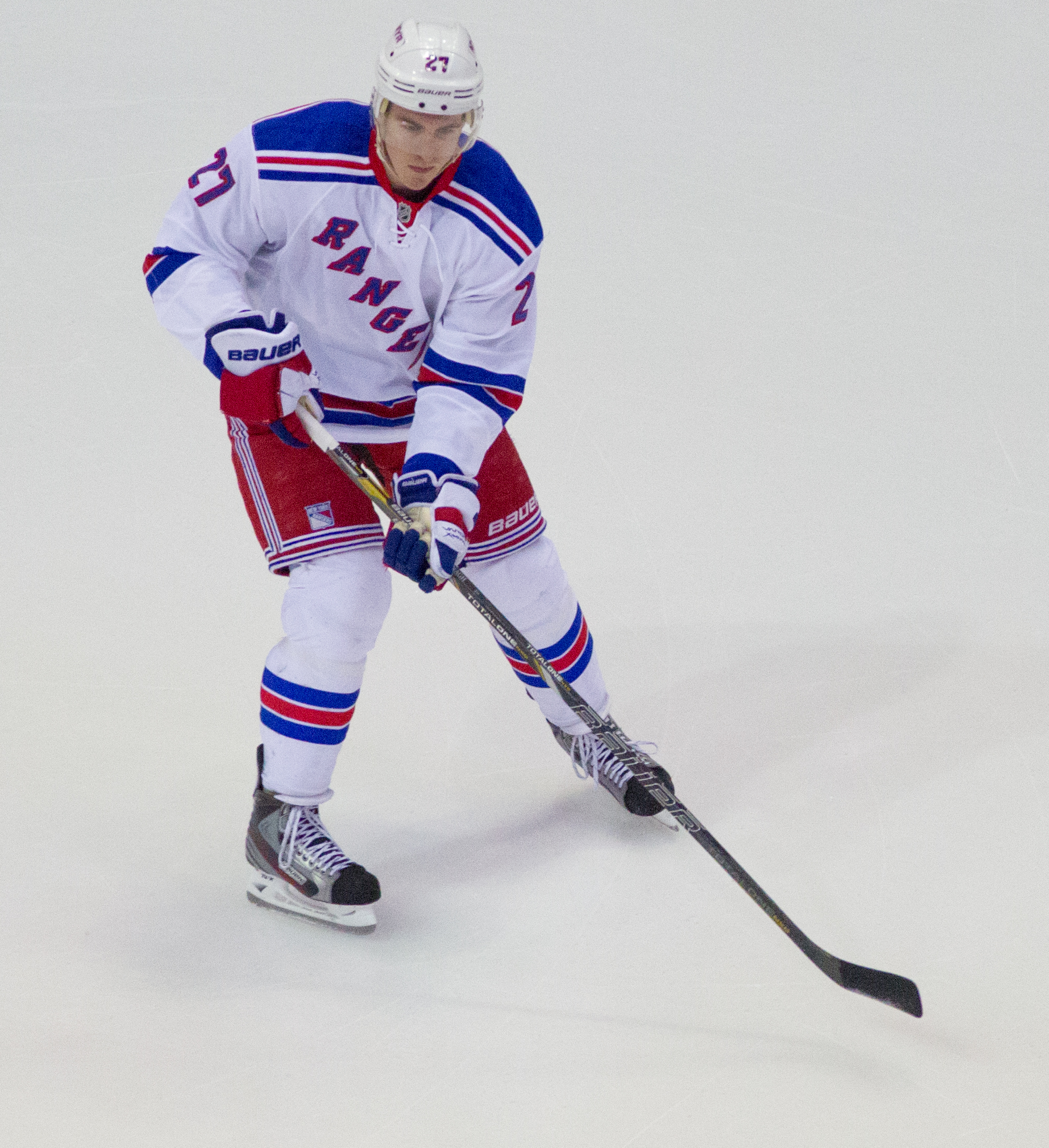
McDonagh with the Rangers in March 2013.

As a result of the 2012–13 NHL lockout, McDonagh signed a contract with Barys Astana of the Kontinental Hockey League (KHL). He became the first American NHL player to join the KHL as a result of the lockout.

On July 8, 2013, McDonagh signed a new six-year, $28.2 million contract with New York. He led all Rangers defensemen with 43 points in the 2013–14 season as the Rangers finished fifth in the Eastern Conference. The team defeated the Philadelphia Flyers, Pittsburgh Penguins and Montreal Canadiens en route to the 2014 Stanley Cup Final against the Los Angeles Kings, where the Rangers lost the series 4–1. During the playoffs, McDonagh was tied for the lead amongst defensemen in assists (13) and ranked second in points (17). For his season's efforts, McDonagh was named Rangers' MVP and the recipient of the Players' Player Award, given to the Ranger "who best exemplifies what it means to be a team player". He became just the second Rangers defenseman to hold both awards after Brian Leetch did so in the 2002–03 season.

On October 6, 2014, McDonagh was named the 27th captain in Rangers history, filling the vacancy left by Ryan Callahan the previous season, and the first defenseman since Brian Leetch in 1997 to be named captain. Martin St. Louis, Marc Staal, Dan Girardi and Derek Stepan were named his alternates. McDonagh became the fourth-youngest Ranger captain and 11th defenseman to hold the honor. In his first season as captain, he led his team to the Presidents' Trophy, but they were ultimately eliminated in the Eastern Conference Final by the Tampa Bay Lightning in seven games. On May 30, 2015, it was revealed that McDonagh had played the final three games of the series with a broken foot.

McDonagh continued his strong play and leadership into the 2015–16 season, his second as team captain. However, during a February 6, 2016, game against the Philadelphia Flyers, McDonagh suffered a concussion after getting punched by Flyers' forward Wayne Simmonds after McDonagh cross-checked Simmonds. McDonagh missed eight games as a result, including a February 14 rematch between the two teams, during which Rangers' rookie defenseman Dylan McIlrath fought Simmonds. Still feeling the effects of the concussion, McDonagh was scratched for two games of the Rangers first round playoff series against the Pittsburgh Penguins, which the Rangers ultimately lost in five games as the Penguins eventually went on to win the Stanley Cup.

==== Tampa Bay Lightning (2018–2022) ====
On February 26, 2018, McDonagh was traded (along with J. T. Miller) to the Tampa Bay Lightning in exchange for Libor Hájek, Brett Howden, Vladislav Namestnikov, a first-round pick in the 2018 NHL entry draft, and a conditional second-round pick in the 2019 NHL entry draft. The trade followed weeks of trade rumors fueled by a team letter to Rangers fans on February 8, announcing a rebuild. On April 18, McDonagh played in his 100th career NHL playoff game.

On June 1, 2018, Ryan McDonagh signed a seven-year, $47.25 million contract extension with the Lightning. During the 2018–19 season, McDonagh would enjoy the best offensive season of his career, playing all 82 games and scoring 9 goals and 46 points during his first full season in Tampa Bay, finishing 8th in Norris Trophy voting. However, McDonagh was held pointless in Tampa Bay's first-round upset loss to the Columbus Blue Jackets.

In the 2019–20 season, McDonagh embraced his role, along with his defensive partner Erik Černák, as Tampa Bay's shutdown defensive pairing. During the 2020 Stanley Cup playoffs, McDonagh would return to the Stanley Cup Final for the first time since 2014, while he was a member of the Rangers. This time, the Lightning emerged victorious, winning McDonagh his first Stanley Cup championship.

McDonagh continued his role as one of Tampa Bay's shutdown defenders in the COVID-delayed 2020–21 season. On June 8, 2021, McDonagh played in his 150th Stanley Cup playoff game against the Carolina Hurricanes. The Lightning would go on to repeat as champions in 2021, winning McDonagh his second consecutive championship. McDonagh led all skaters in plus–minus at +18 during the 2021 Stanley Cup playoffs.

==== Nashville Predators (2022–2024) ====
On July 3, 2022, McDonagh was traded to the Nashville Predators in exchange for defenseman Philippe Myers and forward Grant Mismash.

==== Return to Tampa Bay (2024–present) ====
After two seasons in Nashville, McDonagh was re-acquired by the Lightning on May 21, 2024, in exchange for a second-round pick in 2025 and a seventh-round pick in 2024.

During the 2024–25 season on March 27, 2025, McDonagh played his 1,000th NHL game.

==== 2025 Season ====
McDonagh signed a 3-year extension worth $12.3 million on December 4, 2025.

== Personal life ==
On July 19, 2013, McDonagh married long-time girlfriend Kaylee Keys at Our Lady of Victory Chapel in his hometown of Saint Paul, Minnesota. Former National Football League quarterback Steve Walsh is his uncle.

After being drafted, McDonagh attended the University of Wisconsin–Madison for three seasons, playing with their ice hockey team, before foregoing his final year to turn pro with the Rangers. In January 2021, McDonagh re-enrolled with the school, taking online classes to complete his final 18 credits and graduate with a degree in Personal Finance. McDonagh studies on days he does not have NHL games and revealed he had always planned to return to school to graduate but core courses were not available remotely while he played professionally, and was able to attend again after courses he was interested in were migrated online during the school's response to the COVID-19 pandemic in Wisconsin.

== Career statistics ==
=== Regular season and playoffs ===
| | | | Regular season | | | | | Playoffs |
| Season | Team | League | GP | G | A | Pts | PIM | GP | G | A | Pts | PIM |
|---|---|---|---|---|---|---|---|---|---|---|---|---|
| 2004–05 | Cretin-Derham Hall High School | HS-MN | 28 | 12 | 18 | 30 | | — | — | — | — | — |
| 2005–06 | Cretin-Derham Hall High School | HS-MN | 31 | 12 | 28 | 40 | 24 | — | — | — | — | — |
| 2006–07 | Cretin-Derham Hall High School | HS-MN | 23 | 10 | 23 | 33 | 44 | — | — | — | — | — |
| 2007–08 | University of Wisconsin | WCHA | 40 | 5 | 7 | 12 | 42 | — | — | — | — | — |
| 2008–09 | University of Wisconsin | WCHA | 36 | 5 | 11 | 16 | 59 | — | — | — | — | — |
| 2009–10 | University of Wisconsin | WCHA | 43 | 4 | 14 | 18 | 65 | — | — | — | — | — |
| 2010–11 | Hartford Wolf Pack/CT Whale | AHL | 38 | 1 | 7 | 8 | 12 | — | — | — | — | — |
| 2010–11 | New York Rangers | NHL | 40 | 1 | 8 | 9 | 14 | 5 | 0 | 0 | 0 | 4 |
| 2011–12 | New York Rangers | NHL | 82 | 7 | 25 | 32 | 44 | 20 | 0 | 4 | 4 | 11 |
| 2012–13 | Barys Astana | KHL | 10 | 0 | 3 | 3 | 6 | — | — | — | — | — |
| 2012–13 | New York Rangers | NHL | 47 | 4 | 15 | 19 | 22 | 12 | 1 | 3 | 4 | 6 |
| 2013–14 | New York Rangers | NHL | 77 | 14 | 29 | 43 | 36 | 25 | 4 | 13 | 17 | 8 |
| 2014–15 | New York Rangers | NHL | 71 | 8 | 25 | 33 | 26 | 19 | 3 | 6 | 9 | 8 |
| 2015–16 | New York Rangers | NHL | 73 | 9 | 25 | 34 | 22 | 3 | 0 | 0 | 0 | 0 |
| 2016–17 | New York Rangers | NHL | 77 | 6 | 36 | 42 | 37 | 12 | 2 | 5 | 7 | 12 |
| 2017–18 | New York Rangers | NHL | 49 | 2 | 24 | 26 | 20 | — | — | — | — | — |
| 2017–18 | Tampa Bay Lightning | NHL | 14 | 2 | 1 | 3 | 0 | 17 | 0 | 5 | 5 | 6 |
| 2018–19 | Tampa Bay Lightning | NHL | 82 | 9 | 37 | 46 | 34 | 4 | 0 | 0 | 0 | 2 |
| 2019–20 | Tampa Bay Lightning | NHL | 50 | 1 | 11 | 12 | 19 | 22 | 1 | 4 | 5 | 10 |
| 2020–21 | Tampa Bay Lightning | NHL | 50 | 4 | 8 | 12 | 14 | 23 | 0 | 8 | 8 | 14 |
| 2021–22 | Tampa Bay Lightning | NHL | 71 | 4 | 22 | 26 | 16 | 23 | 1 | 4 | 5 | 14 |
| 2022–23 | Nashville Predators | NHL | 71 | 2 | 18 | 20 | 22 | — | — | — | — | — |
| 2023–24 | Nashville Predators | NHL | 74 | 3 | 29 | 32 | 31 | 6 | 0 | 1 | 1 | 6 |
| 2024–25 | Tampa Bay Lightning | NHL | 82 | 4 | 27 | 31 | 22 | 5 | 0 | 3 | 3 | 0 |
| 2025–26 | Tampa Bay Lightning | NHL | 48 | 6 | 15 | 21 | 6 | 7 | 0 | 1 | 1 | 6 |
| NHL totals | | | 1,058 | 86 | 355 | 441 | 385 | 203 | 12 | 57 | 69 | 107 |

Medal record

Representing the United States

Ice hockey

World U18 Championships
| Silver medal – second place | 2007 Finland | |

=== International ===
| Year | Team | Event | Result | GP | G | A | Pts | PIM |
|---|---|---|---|---|---|---|---|---|
| 2007 | United States | U18 | 2nd place, silver medalist(s) | 7 | 0 | 3 | 3 | 4 |
| 2009 | United States | WJC | 5th | 6 | 0 | 3 | 3 | 2 |
| 2011 | United States | WC | 8th | 7 | 0 | 1 | 1 | 2 |
| 2014 | United States | OG | 4th | 6 | 1 | 1 | 2 | 0 |
| 2016 | United States | WCH | 7th | 3 | 2 | 0 | 2 | 0 |
| Junior totals | | | | 13 | 0 | 6 | 6 | 6 |
| Senior totals | | | | 16 | 3 | 2 | 5 | 2 |

== Awards and honors ==
| Award | Year |
USHS
| Minnesota Mr. Hockey | 2007 |
College
| All-WCHA Rookie Team | 2007–08 |
| All-WCHA Academic Team | 2008–09, 2009–10 |
| All-WCHA Second Team | 2009–10 |
NHL
| NHL All-Star Game | 2016, 2017 |
| Stanley Cup champion | 2020, 2021 |

Awards and achievements
| Preceded by David Fischer | Minnesota Mr. Hockey; 2006–2007 | Succeeded by Aaron Ness |
| Preceded by David Fischer | Montreal Canadiens first-round draft pick 2007 | Succeeded by Max Pacioretty |
| Preceded by Ryan Callahan | New York Rangers captain 2014–2018 | Succeeded by Jacob Trouba |
