= Paul Martin (ice hockey) =

American ice hockey player (born 1981)

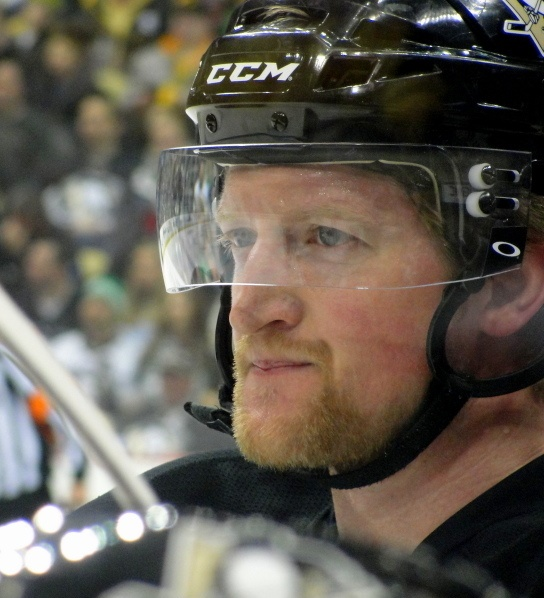
- Martin with the Pittsburgh Penguins in 2013
- Born: March 5, 1981 (age 45) Elk River, Minnesota, U.S.
- Height: 6 ft 1 in (185 cm)
- Weight: 200 lb (91 kg; 14 st 4 lb)
- Position: Defence
- Shot: Left
- Played for: New Jersey Devils; Fribourg-Gottéron; Pittsburgh Penguins; San Jose Sharks
- National team: United States
- NHL draft: 62nd overall, 2000; New Jersey Devils
- Playing career: 2003–2018 Coaching career

Current position
- Title: Graduate Assistant coach
- Team: Minnesota
- Conference: Big Ten

Biographical details
- Education: University of Minnesota

Coaching career (HC unless noted)
- 2020–2021: Minnesota (Undergrad asst.)
- 2022–Present: Minnesota (Grad asst.)

Paul Joseph Martin (born March 5, 1981) is an American former ice hockey defenseman. He was drafted by the New Jersey Devils in the second round, 62nd overall, of the 2000 NHL entry draft, playing six seasons for the organization before joining the Pittsburgh Penguins in 2010 and later the San Jose Sharks in 2015.

== Playing career ==
=== High school/collegiate ===
Martin played high school hockey at Elk River High School and was the Mr. Hockey award winner. In 2000, he was drafted in the second round, 62nd overall, by the New Jersey Devils. He has sound offensive instincts and a projectable frame, and is a classic stay at home defenseman. He was part of a successful program at the University of Minnesota in the Western Collegiate Hockey Association (WCHA). He helped his school win the 2002 and 2003 NCAA Division I National Championships.

=== Professional ===
Martin joined the Devils for the 2003–04 season, playing 70 games in his first full season, putting up 24 points. The next season, Martin played for Fribourg-Gottéron in Switzerland due to the 2004–05 NHL lockout. He returned the next season, this time appearing in 80 games while increasing his point production to 37.

During the 2006–07 season, Martin played the entire 82-game season, though his point total dropped to 26. During the 2009–10 season, Martin suffered a non-displaced fracture in his left forearm, playing in just 22 games and scoring a career-low 11 points.

Martin signed a five-year, US$25 million contract with the Pittsburgh Penguins as an unrestricted free agent on July 1, 2010. He made his Penguins regular season debut on October 7, 2010, against the Philadelphia Flyers, picking up the primary assist on Tyler Kennedy's third period goal, the Penguins' first ever at the Consol Energy Center. He returned to New Jersey to face his former team for the first time on October 11, and finished the game with a goal, an assist and over 26 minutes of ice time in a 3–1 Penguins victory.

Martin scored his first Stanley Cup playoff goal with the Penguins on April 13, 2012, against the Philadelphia Flyers in an 8–5 Penguins loss. He was scratched with an undisclosed injury for Game 4.

On July 1, 2015, Martin was signed as a free agent to a four-year, $19.4 million deal with the San Jose Sharks. He lost to his former team, the Penguins, in the 2016 Stanley Cup Finals. On January 16, 2018, the Sharks assigned Martin to their American Hockey League (AHL) affiliate, the San Jose Barracuda.

On June 22, 2018, the Sharks placed Martin on unconditional waivers for purpose of a buyout. He cleared waivers on June 23, 2018.

He announced his retirement on November 14, 2018.

== International play ==
Martin was named to Team USA for the 2006 Winter Olympics in Turin and again for the 2010 Winter Olympics in Vancouver, along with then-Devils teammates Zach Parise and Jamie Langenbrunner. Martin, however, did not see any action in the 2006 Winter Olympics, and missed the 2010 Winter Olympics due to a broken arm; he was replaced in the latter tournament by Tim Gleason.

Martin was also named to Team USA for the 2014 Winter Olympics in Sochi, where the U.S. failed to medal.

== Philanthropy ==
In 2017, Martin launched the Shine A Ligh7 Foundation, a non-profit organization that distributes funds to qualified non-profit organizations who raise awareness and reduce the stigma for those affected by bullying, depression, and mental health issues.

== Career statistics ==
=== Regular season and playoffs ===
			Regular season					Playoffs
Season	Team	League	GP	G	A	Pts	PIM	GP	G	A	Pts	PIM
1998–99	Elk River High School	HS-MN	24	9	11	20	—	—	—	—	—	—
1999–2000	Elk River High School	HS-MN	24	15	35	50	26	—	—	—	—	—
2000–01	University of Minnesota	WCHA	38	3	17	20	8	—	—	—	—	—
2001–02	University of Minnesota	WCHA	44	8	30	38	22	—	—	—	—	—
2002–03	University of Minnesota	WCHA	45	9	30	39	32	—	—	—	—	—
2003–04	New Jersey Devils	NHL	70	6	18	24	4	5	1	1	2	4
2004–05	HC Fribourg–Gottéron	NLA	11	3	4	7	2	—	—	—	—	—
2005–06	New Jersey Devils	NHL	80	5	32	37	32	9	0	3	3	4
2006–07	New Jersey Devils	NHL	82	3	23	26	18	11	0	4	4	6
2007–08	New Jersey Devils	NHL	73	5	27	32	22	5	1	2	3	2
2008–09	New Jersey Devils	NHL	73	5	28	33	36	7	0	4	4	2
2009–10	New Jersey Devils	NHL	22	2	9	11	2	5	0	0	0	0
2010–11	Pittsburgh Penguins	NHL	77	3	21	24	16	7	0	2	2	2
2011–12	Pittsburgh Penguins	NHL	73	2	25	27	18	3	1	0	1	0
2012–13	Pittsburgh Penguins	NHL	34	6	17	23	14	15	2	9	11	4
2013–14	Pittsburgh Penguins	NHL	39	3	12	15	10	13	0	8	8	6
2014–15	Pittsburgh Penguins	NHL	74	3	17	20	20	5	0	2	2	2
2015–16	San Jose Sharks	NHL	78	3	17	20	22	24	0	5	5	6
2016–17	San Jose Sharks	NHL	81	4	22	26	20	6	1	0	1	4
2017–18	San Jose Sharks	NHL	14	0	2	2	2	7	0	0	0	2
2017–18	San Jose Barracuda	AHL	18	0	2	2	0	—	—	—	—	—
NHL totals			870	50	270	320	238	122	6	40	46	44

=== International ===
Year	Team	Event	Result	GP	G	A	Pts	PIM
2001	United States	WJC	5th	7	0	4	4	0
2004	United States	WCH	4th	3	0	1	1	0
2005	United States	WC	6th	7	0	0	0	2
2008	United States	WC	6th	7	1	7	8	0
2014	United States	OG	4th	4	0	0	0	2
Junior totals				7	0	4	4	0
Senior totals				21	1	8	9	4

== Awards and honors ==
Award	Year
College
All-WCHA Rookie Team	2000–01
All-WCHA Second Team	2001–02, 2002–03
AHCA West Second-Team All-American	2002–03
All-NCAA All-Tournament Team	2003

Awards and achievements
Preceded by Jeff Taffe	Minnesota Mr. Hockey; 2000	Succeeded by Marty Sertich
