= Grant Besse =

American ice hockey player (born 1994)

- Born: July 14, 1994 (age 32) Plymouth, Minnesota, U.S.
- Height: 5 ft 10 in (178 cm)
- Weight: 187 lb (85 kg; 13 st 5 lb)
- Position: Forward
- Shot: Left
- Played for: Cleveland Monsters; Hershey Bears; Krefeld Pinguine; IF Björklöven; Vienna Capitals
- NHL draft: 147th overall, 2013; Anaheim Ducks
- Playing career: 2017–2022

Grant Besse (born July 14, 1994) is an American former professional ice hockey forward. Besse was selected in the 2013 NHL entry draft by the Anaheim Ducks in the 5th round (147th overall).

Besse was named the 2013 Minnesota Mr. Hockey.

== Playing career ==
=== Amateur ===
Playing for the Red Knights of Benilde-St. Margaret's in Minnesota, in 2012 he had 51 goals, bringing his career totals to 115 goals in 85 games. On March 11, 2012, Besse set a state tournament record when he scored five goals, including three short-handed, to power the Benilde-St. Margaret's to a 5-1 win to capture the Minnesota State boys hockey championship. As a result of the five goals, he scored 163 goals in his high school career, finishing fifth in Minnesota history, according to CBS Minnesota.

Besse was named the 2013 Minnesota Mr. Hockey as the top senior player from the state of Minnesota. It was announced in March 2013 that he had also been named Associated Press Player of the Year for Minnesota high school hockey, an award voted on by a state panel of broadcasters and sports writers.

Besse committed to attend the University of Wisconsin–Madison to play NCAA college hockey with the Wisconsin Badgers men's ice hockey team.

Besse scored in his first two career games with the Badgers. He had 14 points in his freshman season, which led all freshman on the team. In his sophomore season he led the entire team in points with 22. His junior season he was named assistant captain and lead the team again in points, but this time with 33.

Following the conclusion of his senior year in the 2016–17 season, Besse completed his four-year collegiate career, posting 37 goals and 97 points in 138 games.

=== Professional ===
With the Anaheim Ducks opting not to offer Besse a contract, he signed as a free agent to his first professional contract with the Norfolk Admirals of the ECHL on October 3, 2017. In the 2017–18 season, Besse completed the campaign as the top scoring rookie in the ECHL, compiling 30 goals and 62 points in 62 games with the Admirals. He led the team in goals and game-winning goals (4), and finished second on the club in assists and points. He was selected to play in the 2018 CCM/ECHL All-Star Classic, and earned a spot on the ECHL All-Rookie Team for his play. Besse, earned a professional tryout with the AHL's Cleveland Monsters at the tail end of the season, finishing with seven points in 11 games. He scored his first AHL goal on March 28, 2018, against the Stockton Heat, and registered three assists against the San Antonio Rampage on April 8.

As a free agent over the summer, Besse secured a one-year AHL contract with the Hershey Bears on August 23, 2018. He began the 2018–19 season familiarly in the ECHL with affiliate, the South Carolina Stingrays. He matched his rookie season totals with the Stingrays, posting 30 goals and 62 points in 60 games. He played in just 7 games with the Hershey Bears, posting 2 goals in his various call-ups.

On April 25, 2019, Besse opted to pursue a European career, signing an initial one-year contract with German club, Krefeld Pinguine of the Deutsche Eishockey Liga (DEL). In the following 2019-20 season, Besse co-led the team with 20 goals through 48 regular season games, before the playoffs were cancelled due to the COVID-19 pandemic.

Leaving Krefeld after one season, Besse signed as a free agent with Swedish second division club, IF Björklöven of the HockeyAllsvenskan (Allsv) on December 3, 2020. Besse was unable to make an impact with IF Björklöven, registering 2 assists in only 8 games before opting to mutually terminate his contract on February 9, 2021.

== Career statistics ==
			Regular season					Playoffs
Season	Team	League	GP	G	A	Pts	PIM	GP	G	A	Pts	PIM
2009–10	Benilde-St. Margaret's School	USHS	27	30	20	50	12	2	3	1	4	0
2010–11	Benilde-St. Margaret's School	USHS	27	33	20	53	18	2	4	1	5	2
2011–12	Benilde-St. Margaret's School	USHS	31	52	41	93	33	6	12	6	18	2
2012–13	Benilde-St. Margaret's School	USHS	28	48	28	76	16	3	4	3	7	2
2012–13	Omaha Lancers	USHL	7	4	0	4	0	—	—	—	—	—
2013–14	University of Wisconsin	B1G	36	8	6	14	12	—	—	—	—	—
2014–15	University of Wisconsin	B1G	32	11	11	22	6	—	—	—	—	—
2015–16	University of Wisconsin	B1G	35	11	22	33	10	—	—	—	—	—
2016–17	University of Wisconsin	B1G	35	9	19	28	8	—	—	—	—	—
2017–18	Norfolk Admirals	ECHL	62	30	32	62	26	—	—	—	—	—
2017–18	Cleveland Monsters	AHL	11	1	6	7	0	—	—	—	—	—
2018–19	South Carolina Stingrays	ECHL	60	30	32	62	33	5	2	0	2	0
2018–19	Hershey Bears	AHL	7	2	0	2	2	—	—	—	—	—
2019–20	Krefeld Pinguine	DEL	48	20	16	36	8	—	—	—	—	—
2020–21	IF Björklöven	Allsv	8	0	2	2	0	—	—	—	—	—
2020–21	Vienna Capitals	ICEHL	6	1	3	4	0	10	1	5	6	0
2021–22	Tölzer Löwen	DEL2	17	5	9	14	4	—	—	—	—	—
AHL totals			18	3	6	9	2	—	—	—	—	—

== Awards and honors ==
Award	Year
USHS
Minnesota Mr. Hockey	2013
Boys Hockey AP Player Of Year	2013
ECHL
All-Rookie Team	2017–18
