= Aaron Ness =

American ice hockey player (born 1990)

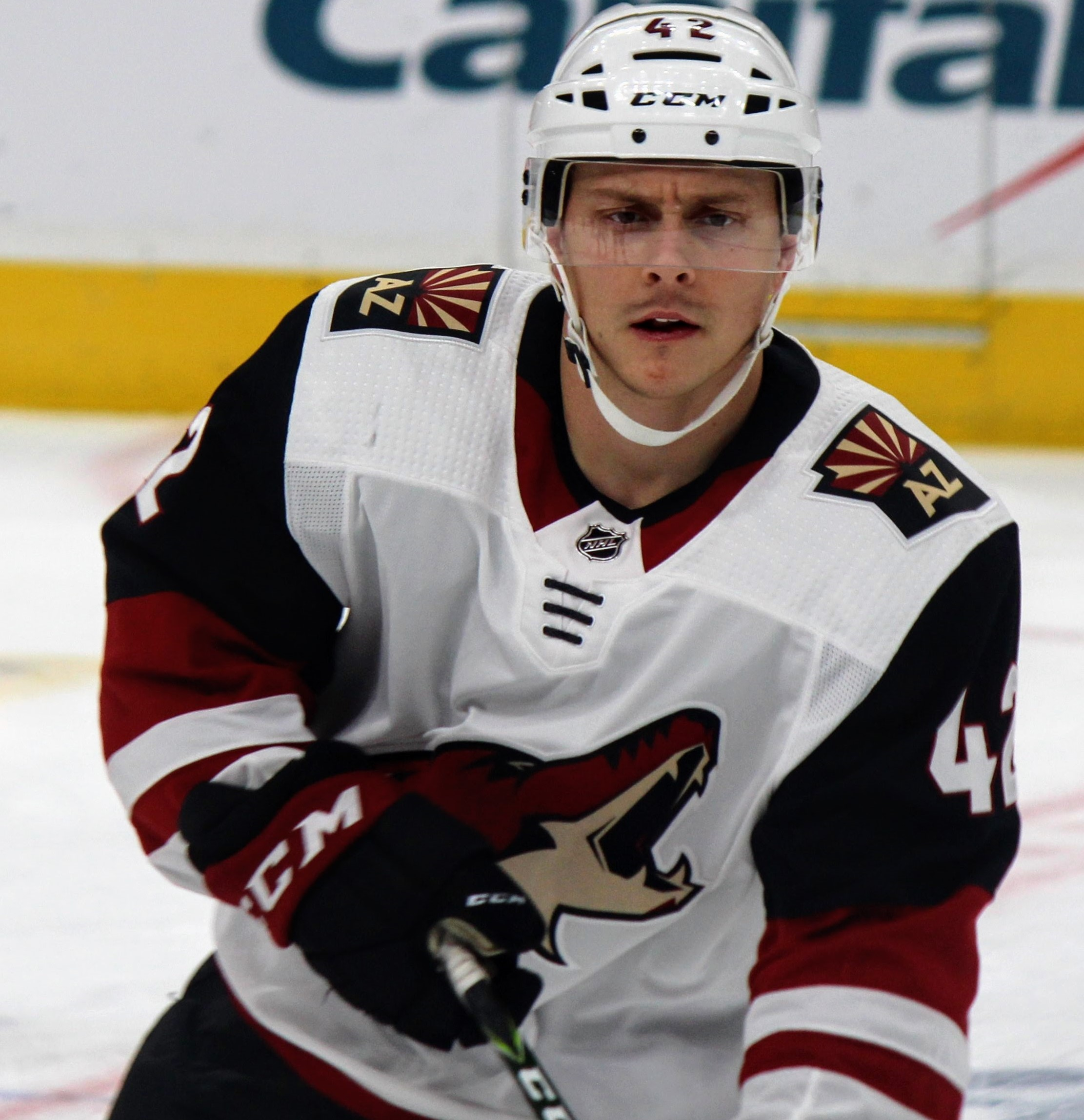
- Ness with the Arizona Coyotes in 2019
- Born: May 18, 1990 (age 36) Roseau, Minnesota, U.S.
- Height: 5 ft 10 in (178 cm)
- Weight: 170 lb (77 kg; 12 st 2 lb)
- Position: Defense
- Shot: Left
- Played for: New York Islanders; Washington Capitals; Arizona Coyotes
- National team: United States
- NHL draft: 40th overall, 2008; New York Islanders
- Playing career: 2011–2026

Aaron Douglas Ness (born May 18, 1990) is an American former professional ice hockey defenseman who played in the National Hockey League (NHL). He was selected by the New York Islanders in the 2nd round (40th overall) of the 2008 NHL entry draft.

== Playing career ==
Ness played High School hockey at Roseau High School in Roseau, Minnesota, and in 2008 he received the Minnesota Mr. Hockey award as the most outstanding senior high school hockey player in the state of Minnesota. In an effort to be able to play collegiate hockey one year earlier than projected, Ness accelerated his course load during his junior year of high school in order to graduate early. A combination of 8 classes at school as well as 3.5 credits online, however, did not stop him from leading his team to a fourth-place finish at the 2008 2A State Tournament. Ness then attended the University of Minnesota, where he played three seasons of NCAA Division I college hockey with the Minnesota Golden Gophers.

On March 16, 2011, the New York Islanders signed Ness to a three-year entry-level contract. In the 2014–15 season, Ness served as team captain of AHL affiliate, the Bridgeport Sound Tigers.

On July 1, 2015, Ness left the Islanders organization as a free agent and signed a one-year, two-way contract with the Washington Capitals. He later re-signed with the Capitals on May 16, 2018, to another one-year two-way contract.

The Capitals called Ness up from Hershey on November 8, 2018, together with fellow defenceman Jonas Siegenthaler, to be available to play against the Columbus Blue Jackets the next night at home in his first NHL game. Veteran Caps defencemen Brooks Orpik (injured reserve) and John Carlson (day-to-day) were both unavailable to play.

After four seasons within the Capitals organization, Ness left as a free agent to sign a two-year, two-way contract with the Arizona Coyotes on July 1, 2019.

Having left the Coyotes organization as a free agent, Ness was signed to a one-year AHL contract with the Providence Bruins on September 30, 2021, and was invited to the Boston Bruins training camp on a professional try-out. He was later signed to an AHL contract with affiliate, the Providence Bruins.

On July 5, 2022, Ness as a free agent, opted to continue his career in the AHL by returning to his former club, the Hershey Bears, on July 5, 2022.

On October 23, 2024, Ness was promoted to captain of the Hershey Bears, after Dylan McIlrath went up to Washington.

On June 2, 2026, Ness announced his retirement from professional ice hockey.

== Personal life ==
Aaron's father, Jay, also grew up in Roseau and played collegiate hockey for the University of North Dakota. Jay was drafted in the 7th round of the 1982 draft by the Chicago Blackhawks.

== Career statistics ==
=== Regular season and playoffs ===
			Regular season					Playoffs
Season	Team	League	GP	G	A	Pts	PIM	GP	G	A	Pts	PIM
2005–06	Roseau High School	HS-MN	30	3	18	21	8	—	—	—	—	—
2006–07	Roseau High School	HS-MN	31	13	38	51	12	—	—	—	—	—
2007–08	Roseau High School	HS-MN	31	28	44	72	16	—	—	—	—	—
2007–08	U.S. NTDP U18	USDP	9	0	6	6	2	—	—	—	—	—
2008–09	University of Minnesota	WCHA	37	2	15	17	16	—	—	—	—	—
2009–10	University of Minnesota	WCHA	39	2	10	12	24	—	—	—	—	—
2010–11	University of Minnesota	WCHA	35	2	12	14	41	—	—	—	—	—
2010–11	Bridgeport Sound Tigers	AHL	13	1	3	4	4	—	—	—	—	—
2011–12	Bridgeport Sound Tigers	AHL	69	5	22	27	36	3	0	0	0	4
2011–12	New York Islanders	NHL	9	0	0	0	2	—	—	—	—	—
2012–13	Bridgeport Sound Tigers	AHL	76	3	24	27	30	—	—	—	—	—
2013–14	Bridgeport Sound Tigers	AHL	48	6	14	20	47	—	—	—	—	—
2013–14	New York Islanders	NHL	20	1	2	3	10	—	—	—	—	—
2014–15	Bridgeport Sound Tigers	AHL	74	8	37	45	62	—	—	—	—	—
2015–16	Hershey Bears	AHL	62	6	21	27	22	21	0	12	12	12
2015–16	Washington Capitals	NHL	8	0	2	2	2	—	—	—	—	—
2016–17	Hershey Bears	AHL	51	5	12	17	24	9	0	1	1	0
2016–17	Washington Capitals	NHL	2	0	0	0	0	—	—	—	—	—
2017–18	Washington Capitals	NHL	8	0	1	1	8	—	—	—	—	—
2017–18	Hershey Bears	AHL	55	4	25	29	26	—	—	—	—	—
2018–19	Hershey Bears	AHL	71	5	50	55	40	6	0	2	2	0
2019–20	Tucson Roadrunners	AHL	17	2	7	9	14	—	—	—	—	—
2019–20	Arizona Coyotes	NHL	24	0	1	1	0	—	—	—	—	—
2020–21	Arizona Coyotes	NHL	1	0	0	0	0	—	—	—	—	—
2021–22	Providence Bruins	AHL	55	3	16	19	16	2	0	1	1	2
2022–23	Hershey Bears	AHL	69	5	14	19	44	16	1	0	1	8
2023–24	Hershey Bears	AHL	68	4	19	23	24	10	1	1	2	2
2024–25	Hershey Bears	AHL	52	3	9	12	34	8	0	0	0	10
2025–26	Hershey Bears	AHL	38	1	5	6	26	6	0	0	0	6
AHL totals			818	61	278	339	449	81	2	17	19	44
NHL totals			72	1	6	7	22	—	—	—	—	—

=== International ===
Year	Team	Event	Result	GP	G	A	Pts	PIM
2008	United States	WJC18	3rd place, bronze medalist(s)	7	0	6	6	2
2022	United States	OG	5th	4	0	1	1	2
Junior totals				7	0	6	6	2
Senior totals				4	0	1	1	2

== Awards and honors ==
Award	Year
College
WCHA All-Academic Team	2010–11
AHL
Second All-Star Team	2018–19
Calder Cup	2023, 2024

Awards and achievements
Preceded by Ryan McDonagh	Minnesota Mr. Hockey; 2007–08	Succeeded by Nick Leddy
Sporting positions
Preceded by Dylan McIlrath	Hershey Bears captain 2024–present	Incumbent
