= Nick Leddy =

American ice hockey player (born 1991)

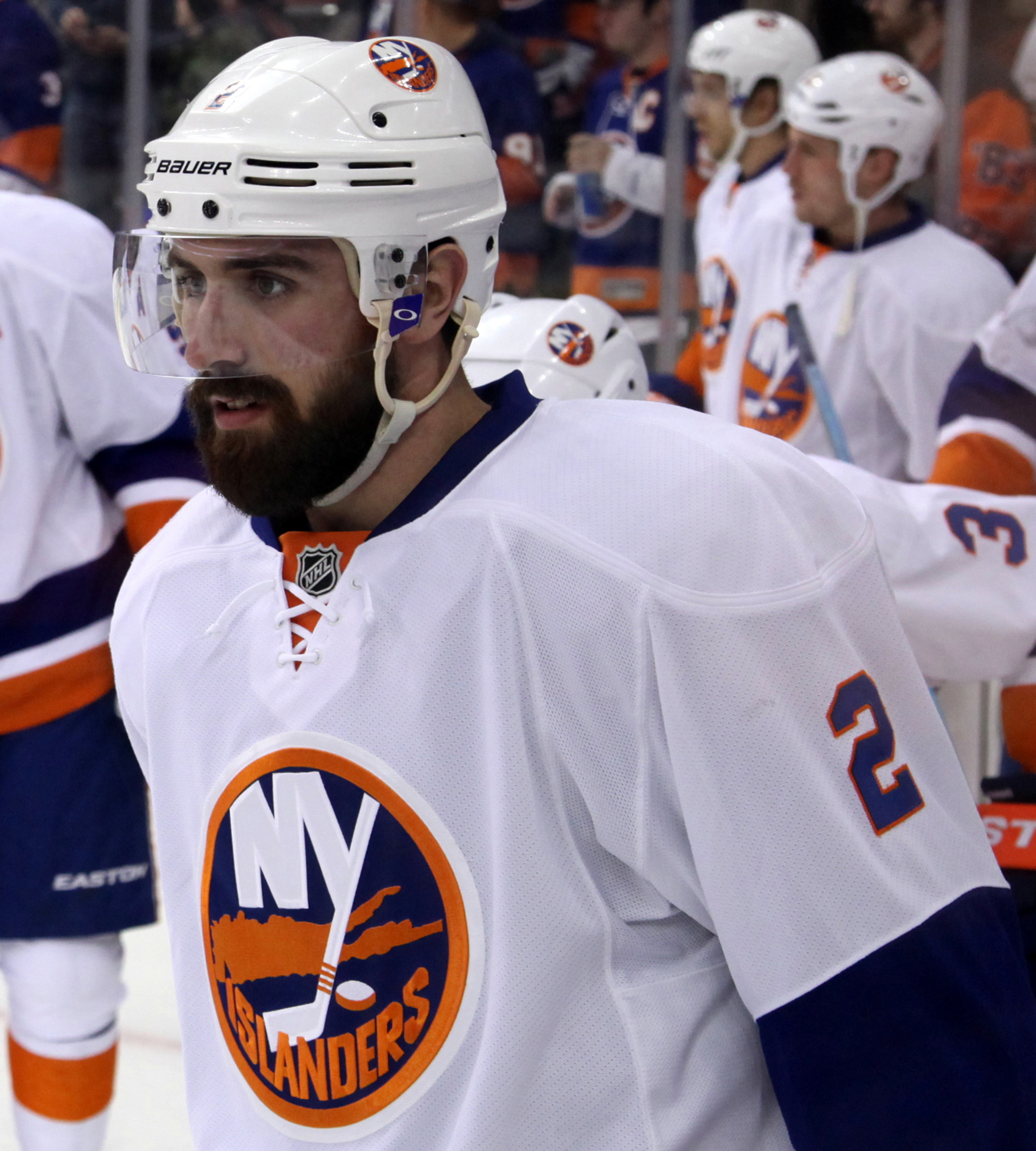
- Leddy with the New York Islanders in January 2015
- Born: March 20, 1991 (age 35) Eden Prairie, Minnesota, U.S.
- Height: 6 ft 0 in (183 cm)
- Weight: 205 lb (93 kg; 14 st 9 lb)
- Position: Defense
- Shoots: Left
- NHL team Former teams: Free agent Chicago Blackhawks; New York Islanders; Detroit Red Wings; St. Louis Blues; San Jose Sharks
- NHL draft: 16th overall, 2009; Minnesota Wild
- Playing career: 2010–present

Nicholas Michael Leddy (born March 20, 1991) is an American professional ice hockey defenseman who is currently an unrestricted free agent. He most recently played for the San Jose Sharks of the National Hockey League (NHL). He was drafted in the first round, 16th overall, by the Minnesota Wild in the 2009 NHL entry draft. He previously played for the Chicago Blackhawks, New York Islanders, Detroit Red Wings and St. Louis Blues. He won a Stanley Cup with the Blackhawks in 2013.

== Playing career ==
=== Amateur and NHL draft ===
After a solid sophomore year at Eden Prairie High School, Leddy recorded 5 goals and 22 assists for a total of 27 points in his junior year. These numbers propelled Leddy to second-team all-Metro and earned him an honorable mention for all-state honors in Minnesota. The USA Hockey National Team Development Program (U.S. NTDP) and USA Hockey acknowledged Leddy as one of the best young players in the nation, but instead of heading to Ann Arbor, Michigan, to join the U.S. NTDP, Leddy chose to finish his high school career with his teammates, and returned to Eden Prairie for his senior year. Leddy posted 12 goals and 33 assists for a total of 45 points during that 2008–09 season, earning him the prestigious Minnesota "Mr. Hockey" award and the title of Metro Player of the Year by the Minneapolis Star-Tribune en route to a state title win over Moorhead High School. In addition, the Associated Press named Leddy to first-team all-state. Leddy was also awarded a position on the Class AA all-state tournament team.

As a freshman at the University of Minnesota in 2009–10, Leddy scored a power-play goal in a 6–1 rout of the University of British Columbia in his NCAA debut. However, shortly afterward, Leddy suffered a broken jaw against University of Alaska Anchorage on October 30, 2009. This injury caused Leddy to miss eight early-season games. When he returned to the lineup Leddy scored his first career goal in his second game back in a win at Minnesota State University on December 5, 2009. In early January 2010, Leddy collected an assist in each game of the Golden Gophers' rout of Harvard University, and soon followed up with two more assists against Alaska Anchorage later in the month. He was named WCHA Rookie of the Week after a three-point game against Colorado College on February 20, 2010, scoring the game-winning goal with two assists. Shortly after having his NHL draft rights traded from Minnesota to Chicago on February 12, 2010, Leddy heated up in February, tallying four assists, five points, 21 shots on goal and a plus-4 rating for the month. He carried that momentum into March, scoring yet another power-play goal against the University of Wisconsin on March 7, 2010. Leddy ultimately was named the team's Rookie of the Year after playing 30 games and ranking third among the team's defensemen in points with 11. He led the team in plus/minus (plus-6), all while maintaining excellent discipline on the ice: Leddy committed just two penalties all season. The Golden Gophers were 7–1 when Leddy had at least one point.

Leddy was drafted in the first round, 16th overall by the Minnesota Wild in the 2009 NHL entry draft. On February 12, 2010, the Minnesota Wild traded Leddy's NHL rights to the Chicago Blackhawks, along with Kim Johnsson in exchange for Cam Barker. University of Minnesota head coach Don Lucia stated in September 2009 that he foresaw Leddy spending at least two years in development with the Golden Gophers before making his transition to the NHL and a professional career.

=== Professional (2010–present) ===
==== Chicago Blackhawks (2010–2014) ====
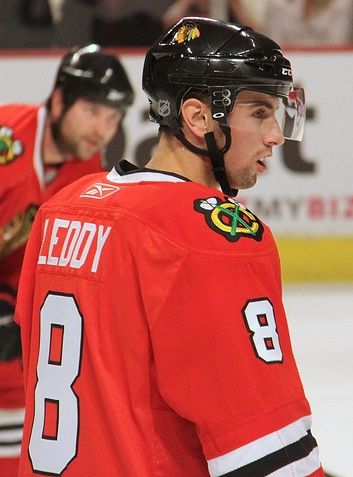
Leddy with the Chicago Blackhawks in October 2010

On July 27, 2010, it was reported by the Chicago Tribune that the Blackhawks had agreed to terms on a three-year, $2.7 million contract with defenseman Nick Leddy, who was to turn professional and leave the University of Minnesota after playing one season, according to his agent, Neil Sheehy. "[Leddy] is really smooth out there and I think he's going to be a Blackhawk for many years," Blackhawks general manager Stan Bowman said July 12 at the conclusion of the Hawks' Prospects Camp.

Leddy played his first NHL game in the 2010–11 season opener on October 7, 2010, in a 4–3 OT loss against the Colorado Avalanche and scored his first NHL goal four days later on October 11, against Ryan Miller of the Buffalo Sabres where the Blackhawks would go on to defeat the Sabres 4–3. On March 20, 2011, Leddy's 20th birthday, Leddy recorded his first career assist on a goal by Duncan Keith in a 2–1 win over the Phoenix Coyotes. After ending the 2010–11 season, his rookie season in the NHL, with the defending Stanley Cup champion Blackhawks narrowly making the playoffs as the eighth and final seed in the West and Leddy playing in 46 games with four goals, three assists and seven points, Leddy made his Stanley Cup playoff debut in the first game in the first round against the Presidents' Trophy-winning Vancouver Canucks on April 13. The defending Stanley Cup champion and eighth-seeded Blackhawks would eventually go on to lose to the Canucks in seven games with Leddy playing all seven games but being held pointless.

Leddy played all 82 games in the 2011–12 season with three goals, 34 assists and 37 points as the Blackhawks finished sixth in the West. On April 14, 2012, Leddy recorded his first career playoff assist and point with an assist on a goal scored by Brandon Bollig in a 4–3 OT win against the Phoenix Coyotes in game two of the first round of the 2012 playoffs. In game five a week later on April 21 where the Blackhawks defeated the Coyotes 2–1 in OT, Leddy scored his first career playoff goal against Coyotes goaltender Mike Smith. The Blackhawks were defeated by the third-seeded Coyotes in six games in the first round of the 2012 playoffs and Leddy would finish the series with a goal and two assists for three points in all six games played.

After playing all 48 games with six goals, 12 assists and 18 points recorded in the lockout-shortened 2012–13 season to help the Blackhawks clinch the Presidents' Trophy as the regular season champions, he was a member of the Blackhawks team that won the Stanley Cup by defeating the Boston Bruins in six games in the 2013 Stanley Cup Final. He ended the 2013 playoffs goalless with two assists and points in all 23 contests played.

On July 3, 2013, Leddy signed a two-year contract extension with the club. Leddy kept up his durability in the 2013–14 season by playing in all 82 games with seven goals, 24 assists and 31 points produced for the Blackhawks as the defending Stanley Cup champion Blackhawks finished fifth in the West. In the 2014 playoffs, Leddy and the Blackhawks would go on another lengthy playoff run beating the St. Louis Blues in six games and the Minnesota Wild in six games in the first two rounds before matching up against the Los Angeles Kings in the Western Conference Finals for the second straight year, this time getting defeated by the eventual Stanley Cup champion Kings in seven games, one win short from a second consecutive appearance in the Stanley Cup Final. Leddy ended the playoffs with a goal and four assists for five points in 18 games.

==== New York Islanders (2014–2021) ====
On October 4, 2014, just five days before the 2014–15 season began and with only one more season left on his contract, Leddy was traded to the New York Islanders in exchange for prospects, Ville Pokka, T. J. Brennan and Anders Nilsson. On February 24, 2015, Leddy and the Islanders agreed to a seven-year, $38.5 million contract.

On October 25, 2019, shortly into the 2019–20 season, Leddy registered two goals on goaltender Anders Nilsson in a 4–2 victory over the Ottawa Senators, including becoming the first Islanders defensemen in franchise history to score on a penalty shot.

==== Detroit Red Wings (2021–2022) ====
Following the pandemic-shortened 2020–21 season, Leddy, with one year remaining on his contract, was traded to the Detroit Red Wings in exchange for Richard Pánik and a 2021 second-round pick.

==== St. Louis Blues (2022–2025) ====
On March 21, 2022, at the 2022 trade deadline, he was traded to the St. Louis Blues, along with Luke Witkowski, in exchange for Oskar Sundqvist, Jake Walman and a 2023 second-round pick. Leddy signed a four-year $16 million contract extension with the Blues on July 13.

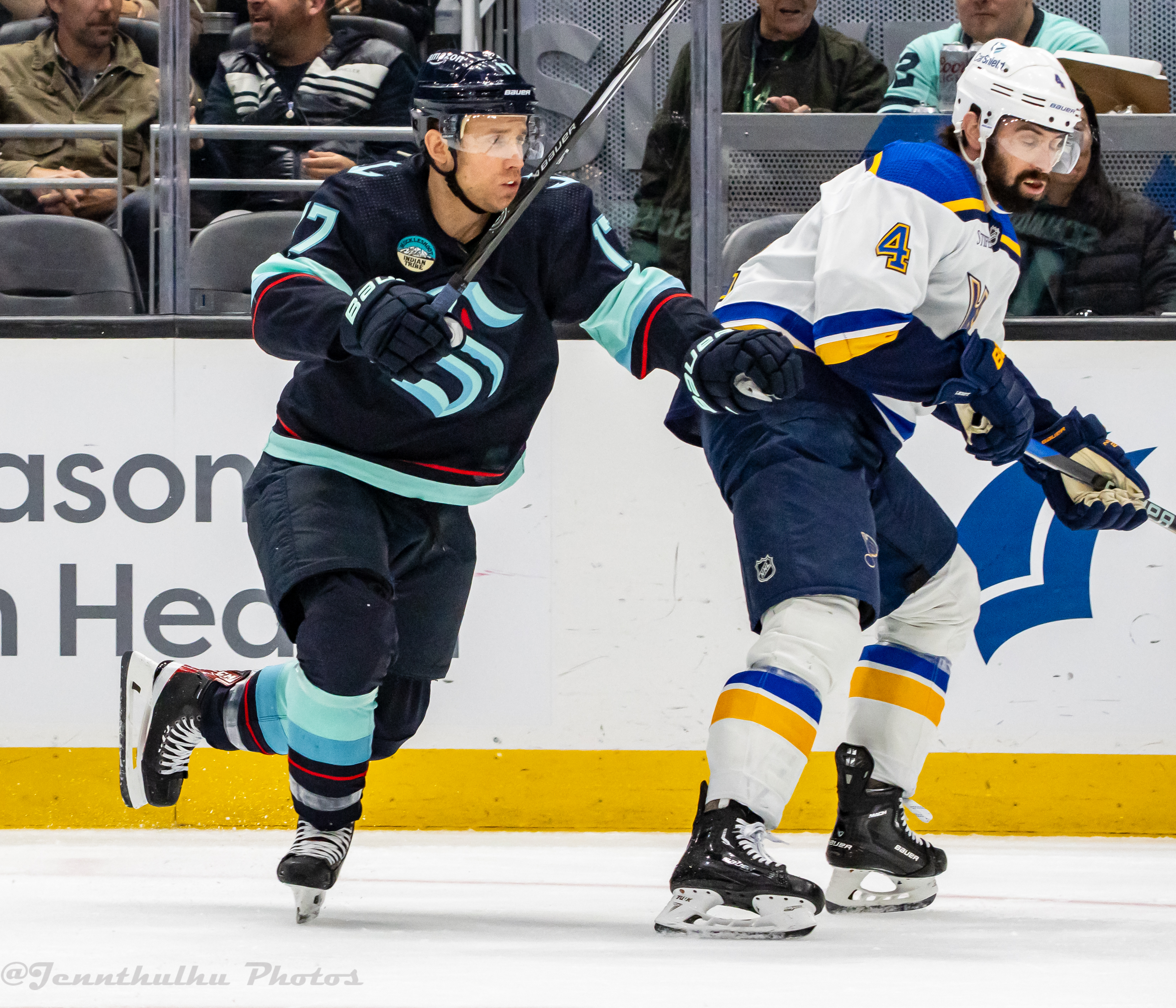
Leddy with the St. Louis Blues defending against Kraken forward Jaden Schwartz in January 2024

On March 23, 2024, Leddy played his 1,000th NHL game against his hometown team that drafted him but never played for, the Minnesota Wild.

==== San Jose Sharks (2025–2026) ====
On July 2, 2025, the Blues placed Leddy on waivers; he was subsequently claimed by the San Jose Sharks the following day.

== International play ==
Medal record

Representing (United States) USA

Ice hockey

World Junior Championships
Bronze medal – third place	2011 USA	

Leddy's high school and post-secondary career was supplemented with intermittent international play and development. He was a member of the U.S. squad in both the under-17 and under-18 Five Nations tournaments in the Czech Republic. In addition, Leddy participated in the 2009 U.S. under-18 evaluation camp in Lake Placid, New York, in association with USA Hockey and the USA Olympic team. Leddy had three goals and two assists in just five games at Lake Placid.

== Career statistics ==
=== Regular season and playoffs ===
			Regular season					Playoffs
Season	Team	League	GP	G	A	Pts	PIM	GP	G	A	Pts	PIM
2006–07	Eden Prairie Eagles	HS-MN	28	2	16	18	10	—	—	—	—	—
2007–08	Eden Prairie Eagles	HS-MN	27	6	22	28	14	—	—	—	—	—
2007–08	U.S. NTDP U18	USDP	4	0	2	2	2	—	—	—	—	—
2008–09	Eden Prairie Eagles	HS-MN	25	8	29	37	22	6	4	4	8	4
2009–10	University of Minnesota	WCHA	30	3	8	11	4	—	—	—	—	—
2010–11	Chicago Blackhawks	NHL	46	4	3	7	4	7	0	0	0	0
2010–11	Rockford IceHogs	AHL	22	2	8	10	2	—	—	—	—	—
2011–12	Chicago Blackhawks	NHL	82	3	34	37	10	6	1	2	3	0
2012–13	Rockford IceHogs	AHL	31	3	13	16	12	—	—	—	—	—
2012–13	Chicago Blackhawks	NHL	48	6	12	18	10	23	0	2	2	4
2013–14	Chicago Blackhawks	NHL	82	7	24	31	10	18	1	4	5	6
2014–15	New York Islanders	NHL	78	10	27	37	14	7	0	5	5	0
2015–16	New York Islanders	NHL	81	5	35	40	25	11	1	3	4	0
2016–17	New York Islanders	NHL	81	11	35	46	12	—	—	—	—	—
2017–18	New York Islanders	NHL	80	10	32	42	20	—	—	—	—	—
2018–19	New York Islanders	NHL	82	4	22	26	18	8	1	0	1	0
2019–20	New York Islanders	NHL	60	3	18	21	14	22	3	4	7	0
2020–21	New York Islanders	NHL	56	2	29	31	8	19	0	6	6	2
2021–22	Detroit Red Wings	NHL	55	1	15	16	16	—	—	—	—	—
2021–22	St. Louis Blues	NHL	20	2	6	8	6	9	1	4	5	2
2022–23	St. Louis Blues	NHL	78	2	21	23	20	—	—	—	—	—
2023–24	St. Louis Blues	NHL	82	3	25	28	14	—	—	—	—	—
2024–25	St. Louis Blues	NHL	31	2	3	5	2	7	0	1	1	2
2025–26	San Jose Sharks	NHL	32	1	6	7	6	—	—	—	—	—
NHL totals			1,074	76	347	423	209	137	8	31	39	16

=== International ===
Year	Team	Event	Result	GP	G	A	Pts	PIM
2008	United States	U18	7th	4	0	2	2
2011	United States	WJC	3rd place, bronze medalist(s)	6	0	3	3	0
Junior totals				10	0	5	5	0

== Awards and honors ==
Award	Year
NHL
Stanley Cup champion	2013

Awards and achievements
Preceded by Aaron Ness	Minnesota Mr. Hockey; 2008–09	Succeeded by Nick Bjugstad
Preceded by Tyler Cuma	Minnesota Wild first-round draft pick 2009	Succeeded by Mikael Granlund
