= David Fischer (ice hockey) =

American ice hockey player (born 1988)

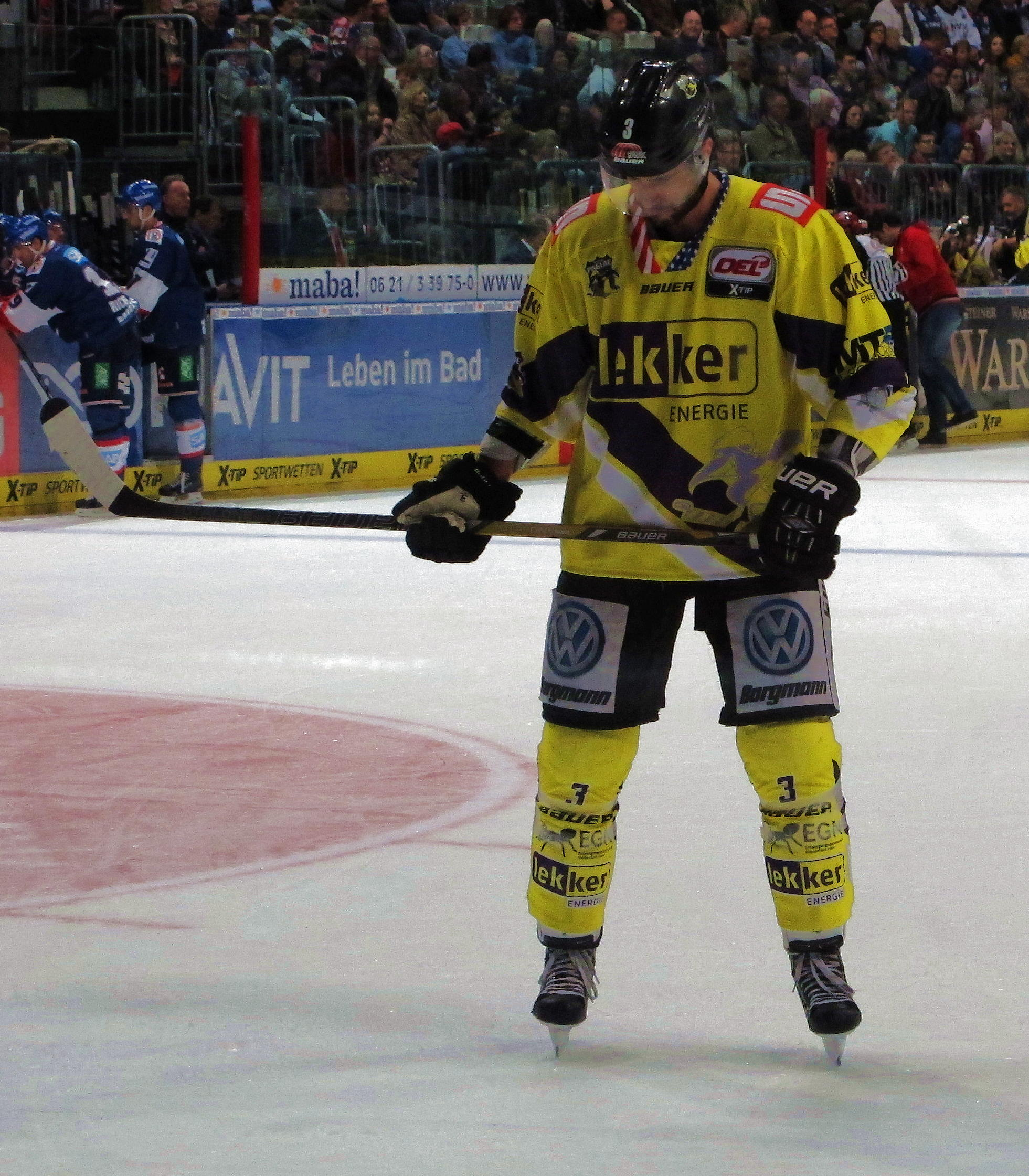
- Born: February 19, 1988 (age 38) Minneapolis, Minnesota, U.S.
- Height: 6 ft 4 in (193 cm)
- Weight: 185 lb (84 kg; 13 st 3 lb)
- Position: Defense
- Shot: Right
- Played for: Krefeld Pinguine; EC KAC
- NHL draft: 20th overall, 2006; Montreal Canadiens
- Playing career: 2010–2020

David Fischer (born February 19, 1988) is an American former professional ice hockey defenseman who is an assistant coach with EC KAC's affiliate club, KAC Future Team of the Alps Hockey League (AlpsHL). He was selected in the first round, 20th overall, by the Montreal Canadiens in the 2006 NHL entry draft.

== Playing career ==
=== Amateur ===
Fischer was born in Minneapolis, Minnesota and played for Apple Valley High School in the Minnesota State High School League. In 2006 - 2007, he played his first season as a freshman for the University of Minnesota in the WCHA. In 42 games, he recorded five assists.

=== Professional ===
Fischer attended training camp with the Vancouver Canucks in 2010, but was released. He signed with the Florida Everblades of the ECHL just over a week later. He played with Florida in both the 2010-11 and 2011-12 seasons, going to the playoffs both years, and winning the Kelly Cup in 2012.

On July 17, 2012, it was announced that Fischer had signed a contract to play with the Heilbronner Falken of the 2nd Bundesliga in Germany.

After a successful season with Heilbronner, Fischer moved up to the top German league the following 2013–14 season, signing a one-year contract for Krefeld Pinguine in the DEL on July 24, 2013. He eventually remained in Krefeld until the end of the 2015-16 campaign.

Fischer penned a deal with EC KAC of the Austrian Hockey League (EBEL) in April 2016.

Fischer missed the entirety of his fifth season with EC KAC in 2020–21 due to injury and after having the intention to resume his career in the 2021–22 season, he was announced to have suffered a setback on August 3, 2021. With a long term recovery looming, Fischer opted to end his 10-year professional playing career, and accept an assistant coaching role to continue within the EC KAC organization on August 16, 2021.

== Career statistics ==
			Regular season					Playoffs
Season	Team	League	GP	G	A	Pts	PIM	GP	G	A	Pts	PIM
2003–04	Apple Valley High School	HSMN	27	2	9	11	10	—	—	—	—	—
2004–05	Apple Valley High School	HSMN	28	8	30	38	26	—	—	—	—	—
2005–06	Apple Valley High School	HSMN	28	8	31	39	22	—	—	—	—	—
2006–07	University of Minnesota	WCHA	42	0	5	5	14	—	—	—	—	—
2007–08	University of Minnesota	WCHA	45	2	12	14	18	—	—	—	—	—
2008–09	University of Minnesota	WCHA	31	2	11	13	16	—	—	—	—	—
2009–10	University of Minnesota	WCHA	39	2	4	6	28	—	—	—	—	—
2010–11	Florida Everblades	ECHL	64	3	26	29	43	4	0	0	0	2
2011–12	Houston Aeros	AHL	2	0	0	0	0	—	—	—	—	—
2011–12	Florida Everblades	ECHL	65	6	44	50	60	13	3	9	12	8
2012–13	Heilbronner Falken	GER.2	46	7	18	25	40	5	0	1	1	2
2013–14	Krefeld Pinguine	DEL	38	6	16	22	26	4	2	3	5	4
2014–15	Krefeld Pinguine	DEL	44	1	19	20	48	3	0	0	0	8
2015–16	Krefeld Pinguine	DEL	49	2	18	20	70	—	—	—	—	—
2016–17	EC KAC	EBEL	32	3	19	22	22	14	0	9	9	8
2017–18	EC KAC	EBEL	51	6	17	23	32	6	1	1	2	6
2018–19	EC KAC	EBEL	54	5	25	30	50	15	2	8	10	24
2019–20	EC KAC	EBEL	45	3	17	20	30	3	1	1	2	4
DEL totals			131	9	53	62	144	7	2	3	5	12
EBEL totals			182	17	78	95	134	38	4	19	23	42

== Awards ==
- Minnesota Mr. Hockey (best senior high school player in Minnesota): 2005–06 season.

Awards and achievements
Preceded by Brian Lee	Minnesota Mr. Hockey; 2005–06	Succeeded by Ryan McDonagh
Preceded by Carey Price	Montreal Canadiens First Round Pick; 2006	Succeeded by Ryan McDonagh
