= Roseau High School =

Coordinates: 48°50′56″N 95°45′23″W

Location
- 509 3rd St NE; Roseau, Minnesota 56751; United States

Information
- Type: Public
- Motto: A Continuing tradition of Academic, Athletic, and Arts Excellence!
- School district: Roseau Community Schools
- Principal: Joe Broderick
- Staff: 31.83 (FTE)
- Enrollment: 535 (2023-2024)
- Student to teacher ratio: 16.81
- Athletics conference: Mariucci (hockey)
- Team name: Rams
- Rivals: Warroad Warriors
- Colors: Dark Green White
- Website: www.roseau.k12.mn.us

Roseau High School is a public high school in Roseau, Minnesota, United States serving students from grades 7 through 12. It is part of Roseau Community Schools, Minnesota ISD 682. The school's hockey program has matriculated several NHL and Olympic hockey players.

== Notable people ==
=== Alumni ===
- Mike Baumgartner (Class of 1967) — NHL player
- Earl Anderson (Class of 1968) — NHL player
- Dale Smedsmo (Class of 1967) — NHL player
- Neal Broten (Class of 1977) — 1980 US Olympic hockey team member, NHL player
- Aaron Broten (Class of 1978) — NHL player
- Butsy Erickson (Class of 1978) — NHL player
- Paul Broten (Class of 1984) — NHL player
- Josh Olson (Class of 1999) — NHL player
- Dustin Byfuglien (2001) (transferred out) — NHL player
- Aaron Ness (Class of 2008) — NHL player, New York Islanders

== Faculty ==
- Dean Blais — 1990–1991 boys' hockey coach
- Dan Fabian — member of the Minnesota House of Representatives, teacher since 1976
- Harold Paulsen — 1940s boys' hockey coach
