= Kyle Rau =

American ice hockey player (born 1992)

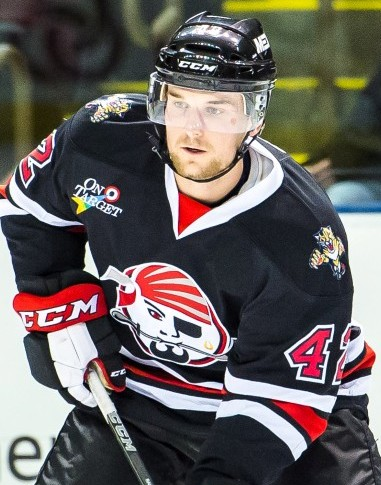
- Rau with the Portland Pirates in 2015
- Born: October 24, 1992 (age 33) Eden Prairie, Minnesota, U.S.
- Height: 5 ft 9 in (175 cm)
- Weight: 172 lb (78 kg; 12 st 4 lb)
- Position: Left wing
- Shoots: Left
- NL team Former teams: HC Fribourg-Gottéron; Florida Panthers; Minnesota Wild; Abbotsford Canucks; San Jose Barracuda; Kunlun Red Star
- NHL draft: 91st overall, 2011; Florida Panthers
- Playing career: 2015–present

Kyle Rau (born October 24, 1992) is an American professional ice hockey forward who plays for HC Fribourg-Gottéron of the National League (NL). He was selected in the third round, 91st overall, by the Florida Panthers in the 2011 NHL entry draft.

== Playing career ==
In following his family ties, Rau first established himself in being a standout player in high school with Eden Prairie High. In his final year in 2011, Rau scored 69 points in 25 games to earn selection as the Minnesota Mr. Hockey winner, as the best school player in Minnesota. Rau committed and played collegiate hockey within his home state, with the Minnesota Golden Gophers.

In his senior year, Rau captained Minnesota for the 2014–15 season. Leading the Gophers to the Big Ten Conference Championship, he compiled 20 goals and 41 points in 39 games. On March 29, 2015, Rau signalled the end of his college career, having amassed 164 points in 160 contests, in signing a three-year entry-level contract with the Florida Panthers. He was then signed to an amateur try-out contract to complete the season in making his professional debut in the American Hockey League with affiliate, the San Antonio Rampage. Rau scored in his first game with the Rampage on his first shot, in a 7–3 defeat to the Adirondack Flames on April 4, 2015.

After attending the Panthers 2015 training camp, Rau was assigned to being his rookie professional season with new AHL affiliate, the Portland Pirates on September 25, 2015. In the 2015–16 season, Rau quickly adapted to the pro level, scoring 17 goals in 48 games before he received his first NHL recall to the Panthers on February 19, 2016. He made his NHL debut in a 3–1 victory over the Winnipeg Jets on February 20, 2016.

Following the 2016–17 season with the Panthers, Rau was surprisingly not tendered a qualifying offer as a restricted free agent. On July 1, 2017 he signed as a free agent to a one-year, two-way contract with the Minnesota Wild.

Rau spent most of the 2018-19 season with the Iowa Wild placing second on the team in goals scored with 26, fourth on the team in assists at 27, and third on the team in points with 53. Rau made his debut on January 20, 2018 with the Minnesota Wild, against the Tampa Bay Lightning. He got his first point with the Wild as the secondary assist on a Nate Prosser goal. Rau stayed with the Minnesota Wild for the month of February playing in 6 games before getting sent back down to Iowa.

As a free agent from the Wild after 5 seasons within the organization, Rau remained un-signed leading into the following 2022–23 season. On October 25, 2022, he was signed to a one-year AHL contract with the Abbotsford Canucks, the primary affiliate to the Vancouver Canucks.

For the second consecutive season, Rau remained un-signed leading into the commencement of the 2023–24 season, before belatedly signing a one-year contract with the San Jose Barracuda of the AHL on December 11, 2023. He scored 7 goals and 23 assists for 30 points in 48 games, good for 6th on the team.

On December 27th, 2024, Rau signed a deal with Kunlun Red Star of the Kontinental Hockey League (KHL) to finish the 2024-25 season.

== Personal ==
Kyle's older brother, Chad Rau, played NCAA hockey with Colorado College and is a retired professional ice hockey player. He also has a brother, Matt, and a twin brother, Curt.

== Career statistics ==
=== Regular season and playoffs ===
			Regular season					Playoffs
Season	Team	League	GP	G	A	Pts	PIM	GP	G	A	Pts	PIM
2009–10	Eden Prairie High School	USHS	25	38	39	77	12	3	2	2	4	0
2010–11	Eden Prairie High School	USHS	25	33	36	69	8	6	8	4	12	2
2010–11	Sioux Falls Stampede	USHL	11	4	6	10	15	10	7	5	12	4
2011–12	University of Minnesota	WCHA	40	18	25	43	29	—	—	—	—	—
2012–13	University of Minnesota	WCHA	40	15	25	40	22	—	—	—	—	—
2013–14	University of Minnesota	B1G	41	14	26	40	16	—	—	—	—	—
2014–15	University of Minnesota	B1G	39	20	21	41	18	—	—	—	—	—
2014–15	San Antonio Rampage	AHL	7	2	1	3	0	1	0	0	0	2
2015–16	Portland Pirates	AHL	63	17	14	31	24	5	1	1	2	2
2015–16	Florida Panthers	NHL	9	0	0	0	2	—	—	—	—	—
2016–17	Springfield Thunderbirds	AHL	48	10	14	24	32	—	—	—	—	—
2016–17	Florida Panthers	NHL	24	2	1	3	4	—	—	—	—	—
2017–18	Iowa Wild	AHL	69	23	27	50	16	—	—	—	—	—
2017–18	Minnesota Wild	NHL	3	0	1	1	0	1	0	0	0	0
2018–19	Iowa Wild	AHL	69	26	27	53	24	11	4	2	6	4
2018–19	Minnesota Wild	NHL	6	0	1	1	0	—	—	—	—	—
2019–20	Iowa Wild	AHL	51	14	29	43	6	—	—	—	—	—
2020–21	Minnesota Wild	NHL	14	0	2	2	9	1	0	0	0	0
2021–22	Iowa Wild	AHL	55	25	28	53	56	—	—	—	—	—
2021–22	Minnesota Wild	NHL	5	0	0	0	0	—	—	—	—	—
2022–23	Abbotsford Canucks	AHL	68	16	19	35	24	6	1	5	6	2
2023–24	San Jose Barracuda	AHL	48	7	23	30	18	—	—	—	—	—
2024–25	Kunlun Red Star	KHL	20	6	5	11	6	—	—	—	—	—
NHL totals			61	2	5	7	15	2	0	0	0	0

=== International ===
Year	Team	Event	Result	GP	G	A	Pts	PIM
2012	United States	WJC	7th	6	3	2	5	4
Junior totals				6	3	2	5	4

== Awards and honors ==
Award	Year
USHS
Minnesota Mr. Hockey	2011
College
All-WCHA Rookie Team	2011–12
WCHA All-Academic Team	2013
B1G Second All-Star Team	2014
NCAA All-Tournament Team	2014
NCAA West Second All-American Team	2014
B1G Second All-Star Team	2015
NCAA All-Americans 2nd Team	2015
