= Ice hockey in Minnesota =

- Flag of Minnesota
- Country: United States
- Governing body: USA Hockey
- National teams: Men's national team Women's national team
- First played: 1883

Club competitions
- List: NHL / PWHL (major professional) NCAA (collegiate) NAHL / NA3HL / USPHL / USHS (junior)

Minnesota, more so than any other state, is a major focal point for ice hockey in the United States. Since the late-19th century, the cold, winter weather enabled the state to be a natural home for ice hockey, and many residents have invested a notable amount of time, effort, and energy into the game.

== History ==
=== Origins ===
1883 saw the first ice rink built in Saint Paul to host game of ice polo (an early derivation of shinny). The local tournaments were so popular that within a decade, an artificial indoor rink was built to support the series. In 1895, piggybacking on the popularity of ice polo, a championship ice hockey team from Winnipeg travelled south to take on a team made up of students from the University of Minnesota. This is the earliest recorded official game of ice hockey in the state. The following winter, several new teams appeared and a tournament was held in Saint Paul. Former polo player Ed Murphy was a key contributor in driving the transition from polo to hockey. Over the next several years, many amateur teams appeared all over the state as did several indoor rinks. The early adoption of ice hockey in Minnesota didn't appear to catch the attention of outsiders, as most professional leagues ignored Minnesota, but that didn't deter the locals.

After the end of World War I, colleges around the state began to formally support ice hockey programs. The flagship school, Minnesota was the centerpiece for this expansion and the Gophers swiftly became one of the top college teams in the country. The other programs were scattered all over the state from Eveleth to Duluth to St. Cloud and helped to ensure that every region in the state had a local team they could call their own. The college programs were fed by a series of high schools that increased as additional rinks were built in the state. High school hockey had its origins dating back to 1905 but began to see rapid expansion in the 1920s.

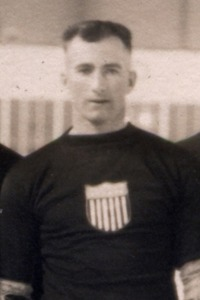
Moose Goheen at the 1920 Summer Olympics

Coinciding with the proliferation of junior and college teams, amateur and professional hockey also took off during the interwar period. The St. Paul Saints, who played their first game before the war, became one of the top amateur clubs in the country and provided four players for the inaugural US national team at the 1920 Olympics. Cyril Weidenborner, Edward Fitzgerald, Moose Goheen and Anthony Conroy were all Minnesota natives and earned silver medals in Antwerp.

The Saints would later become a professional team and join the American Hockey Association, the nation's first minor ice hockey league. They were able to form a natural rivalry with the cross-town Minneapolis Millers but professional hockey in Minnesota experienced a few bumps in the road. The Great Depression forced several teams to cease operations and made many others switch back to amateur hockey, as they could not afford to pay the players. Both Saint Paul and Minneapolis, along with the Eveleth Rangers, left the AHA to found the Central Hockey League during the darkest days of the depression and kept senior hockey alive in the early 1930s. Fortunately, the economic situation improved by the middle of the decade and the CHL was absorbed back into the AHA in 1935.

=== Postwar years ===
When the United States entered World War II, many leagues and teams across Minnesota suspended operations for the duration. The University of Minnesota was one of the few programs in the country to continue playing during the war. After the end of the war, the proliferation of ice hockey resumed and the first state high school tournament was held. Since the mid-40s, Minnesota high schools have been one of the biggest producers of American ice hockey players and have become a point of pride for the state. While USA Hockey has assumed control of most junior organizations throughout the country, the state's secondary schools have remained staunchly independent and been ranked among the best junior programs in the nation. In 2023, a poll was released, ranking the more than 2,000 high school ice hockey programs in the nation. The top 13 high schools were all from Minnesota, demonstrating just how important Minnesota's high school system is to American ice hockey.

With the grassroots of ice hockey well established after the war, Minnesota was producing a great deal of local talent. Unfortunately, at this time there were only 6 NHL teams and there was a de facto ban on American players. From 1945 through 1967 the rosters of NHL teams were made up almost entirely by Canadians. Even the four American clubs, who were run by Canadian managers and coaches, followed this pattern. This effect was also felt in the minor leagues, who largely employed Canadians regardless of their location. With little chance of playing at the highest levels of the sport, Minnesota players had few options to choose from during this time. Many choose to leverage their high school exploits into college scholarships but, there too was a problem. While American colleges had used mostly American players prior to World War II, an arms race of sorts began after the war. Many western colleges began to recruit more of their players from Canada, taking advantage of lax NCAA rules that permitted overage junior players to attend college. Spearheaded by Vic Heyliger at Michigan, college rosters became increasingly Canadian throughout the 1950s with a few glaring exceptions.

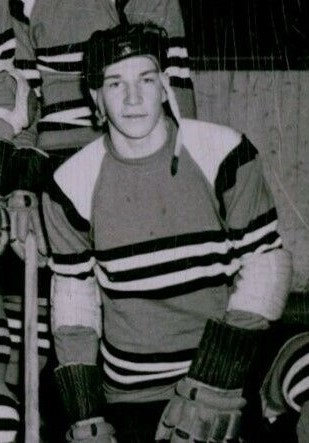
John Mayasich

Elwin Romnes, a Minnesota native and former NHL player, took over as head coach at Minnesota in 1947. He rejected the new trend of importing Canadian players and continued to rely upon home-grown talent. After his departure 5 years later, that policy was reinforced by John Mariucci, another former NHLer who had won an intercollegiate title with Minnesota in 1940. Mariucci was a vocal critic of using Canadian players and achieved more notability for his commitment when Minnesota's American roster was able to match and even surpass other schools. In 1953 and 1954, the Gophers finished as the national runners-up thanks in large part to John Mayasich, the best college player at the time. Mayasich had been a star high school player and went on to set numerous records at the college level. He was so well regarded that in 2011, Mayasich was ranked as the best high school player in the history of Minnesota hockey. Despite his exploits, Mayasich didn't receive a single offer from an NHL team. While that was not wholly unexpected, Mayasich would later express regret in an interview with Sports Illustrated.

"It wasn't a source of bitterness, since no college players were being given a chance...but there's still regret, even to this day, not knowing if I could have done it."

While Mayasich, as well as many other players, couldn't pursue a professional career at the time, they were able to continue playing in other avenues. Mayasich joined the US national team and, because the IOC only permitted amateurs at the time, the lack of professional opportunities helped the national program. With a roster made up of the best players in the country, the United States won a silver medal in ice hockey in 1956 and followed that up with their first gold medal in 1960. Of the 17 players on the roster, 7 were from Minnesota (including Mayasich).

After the AHA failed to return after the war, the teams that had survived the hibernation formed a new circuit called the United States Hockey League. That minor league lasted just 6 years and the revivals of both the Saints and Millers didn't extend beyond the league's end. After several failed attempts with pro hockey, Minnesota turned to senior amateur leagues and saw a good deal of success. The most storied senior team is probably the Warroad Lakers who won many championships in its 50-year history, including three when it was invited to participate in Canada's national senior tournament.

=== Professional opportunities ===
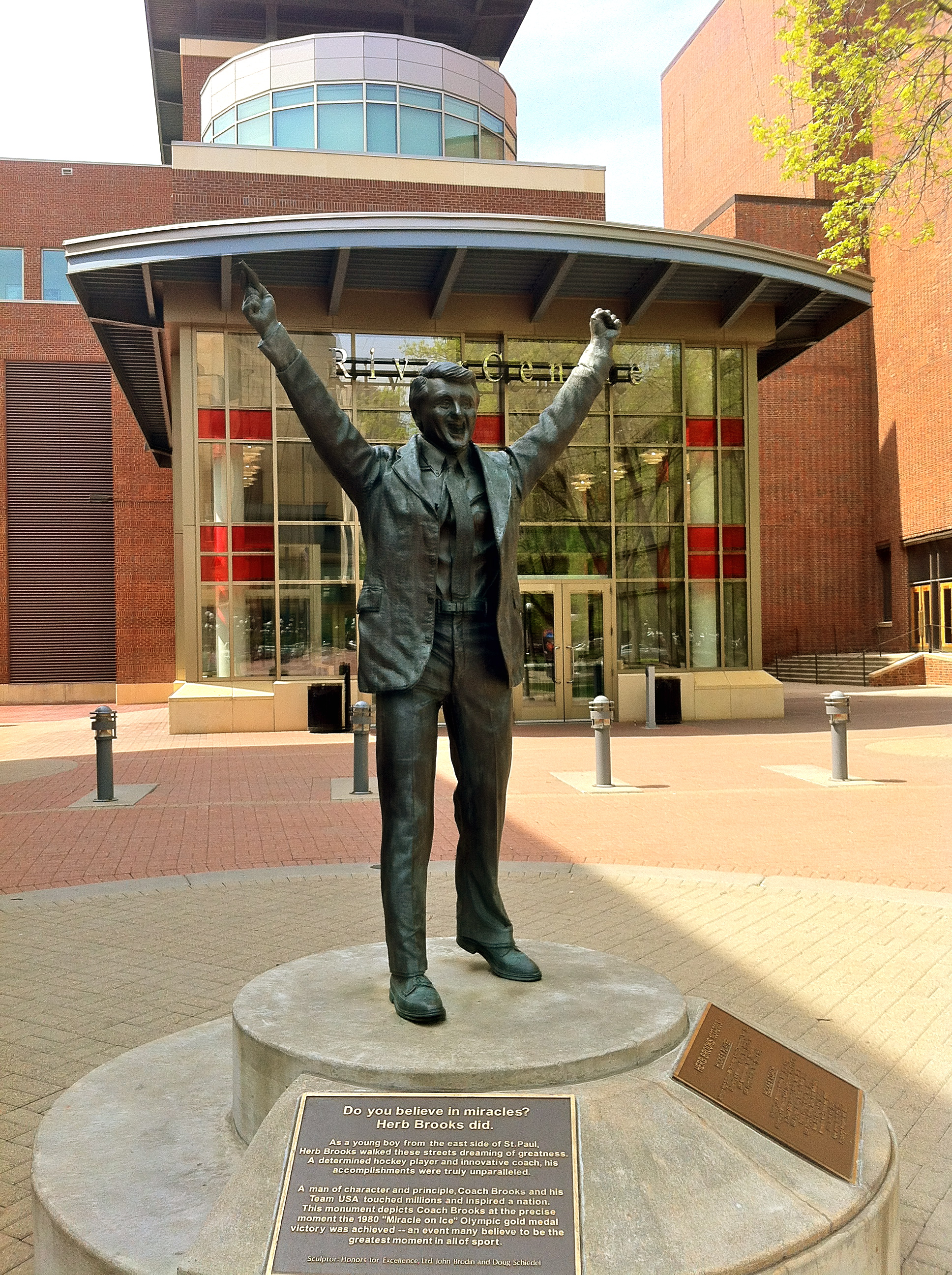
A statue of Herb Brooks outside RiverCentre, in Saint Paul

After 1960, the NHL began to soften its uncharitable view of US colleges but only towards Canadian players. It wasn't until the league expanded to 12 teams in 1967 that American players had a chance to play at the professional level once more. Despite one of the NHL's expansion teams being the Minnesota North Stars, not a single player from the state made the roster in the first season. However, the doubling of the NHL also required a complimentary increase in the minor leagues and many American players were finally able to get into the pro ranks in either the AHL, IHL, or CPHL. As the NHL continued to expand throughout the 60s and 70s, the addition of the World Hockey Association in 1972 raised the number of major professional teams in North American teams to 28. With nearly 5 times as many positions to fill as there had been just 5 years prior, American players could no longer be frozen out of any level of the sport.

Coinciding with the rapid professional expansion was the arrival of Herb Brooks as coach at Minnesota. While Brooks continued the established policy of native Minnesotans only, he was the first coach to lead the Gophers to a national championship. That summer, eight players were selected in the NHL Draft, a stark increase from the two who had been taken in the previous five drafts combined. Brooks kept Minnesota as one of the top teams in the nation for the rest of the decade, winning two more championships, before taking over as head coach for the US national team. He would become legendary at the 1980 Olympics, leading a team made entire out of college players to a win over the juggernaut Soviet Union team in the Miracle on Ice. It is widely regarded as the most stunning upset of the 20th century. Similar to the gold medal team in 1960, the Miracle squad had 12 of its 20 players hail from Minnesota.

1980 was a turning point in the history of Minnesota hockey. While the success at the Olympics was national news and spawned the professional careers of Brooks as well as players like Rob McClanahan, Mike Ramsey and Mark Pavelich, other events were also occurring. A second USHL had been started in 1961 and served as a senior league until 1979. That summer, the league changed to become the nation's first major junior circuit and develop American junior players for the professional level. While the league was a competitor to the CHL, the USHL structured itself so that its players would still be eligible to play collegiately, something that the CHL players had been barred from accomplishing since 1973. The league was initially centered in and around Minnesota, however, by 2000 not a single USHL team was left in Minnesota. Direct competition from Minnesota high schools was largely responsible for the change, however, the USHL continues to be populated my many players from Minnesota seeking a larger national profile.

Over the succeeding years, ice hockey has continued its place as the most popular sport in Minnesota. In 2009, Governor Tim Pawlenty signed a bill officially making ice hockey the state sport. Despite the unquestioned support, Minnesota has seen some surprising turn of events. The most obvious counterpoint being the departure of the North Stars. In 1992, the North Stars were suffering from low attendance, having finished with a losing record in each of their previous six seasons. Even a surprise run to the 1991 Stanley Cup Final was able to turn the team around. At the time, many pointed out that the team's poor on-ice performance wasn't the only issue, with team owner Norman Green's much-publicized fight with the Target Center being top of mind. Regardless of the reasons, the North Stars were in financial trouble and Green sought to move the team. After his first choice of Los Angeles was blocked by the impending arrival of the Anaheim Mighty Ducks, Green moved the team to Dallas in 1993. The NHL swiftly returned to the twin cities with the Minnesota Wild debuting in 2000. However, that did little to mollify the local fans who were forced to watch the Dallas Stars win the Stanley Cup in 1999.

=== Women's hockey ===
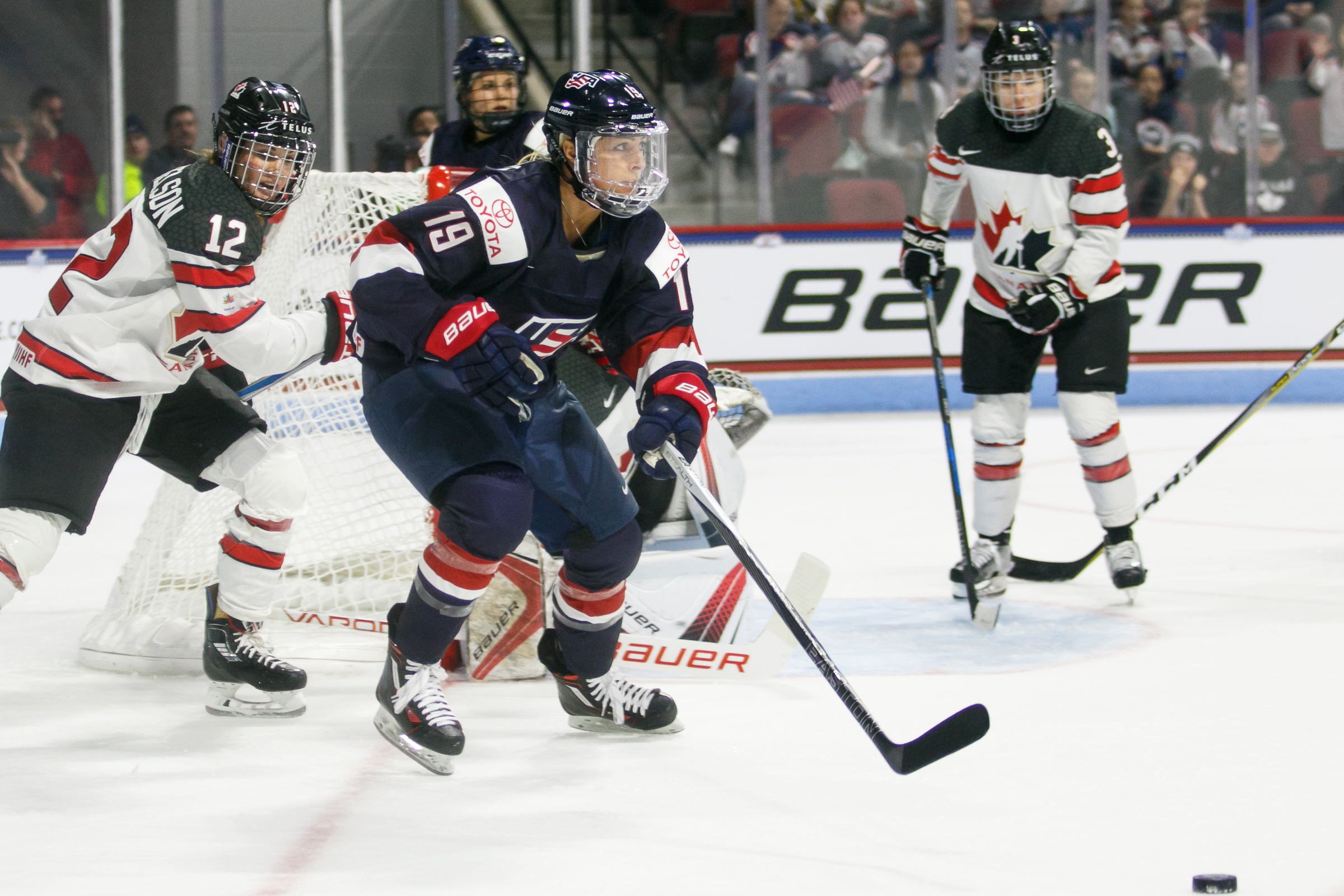
Gigi Marvin, from Warroad, playing for the US national team

While Minnesota was one of the first states to begin playing ice hockey, they were a little slower with the addition of the women's game. Some high schools added girls programs in the 1970s but there weren't sufficient teams to start a state tournament until 1995. That same year, the first varsity women's program was begun at Augsburg. Again, however, that came nearly 30 years after the start of the first collegiate women's program.

When women's hockey debuted at the 1998 Winter Olympics, just two players on Team USA's gold-medal-winning squad hailed from Minnesota. Fourteen separate college programs were started over a three-year period and helped to close the gap in women's hockey. Adding to that was the success of the women's team at Minnesota, who won seven national championships over a 16-year span. The vast increase in investment and opportunity for women's hockey in Minnesota produced tangible results; when the US won its second Olympic gold in 2018, seven of team's players came from the North Star state while a further three played collegiately in the state.

In the first season of the Professional Women's Hockey League (PWHL), one of the six original teams hailed from Minnesota. On May 30, 2024, Minnesota Frost won the inaugural Walter Cup and became the first PWHL champions. On May 26, 2025, the Frost defended their title and repeated as Walter Cup champions.

== Teams ==
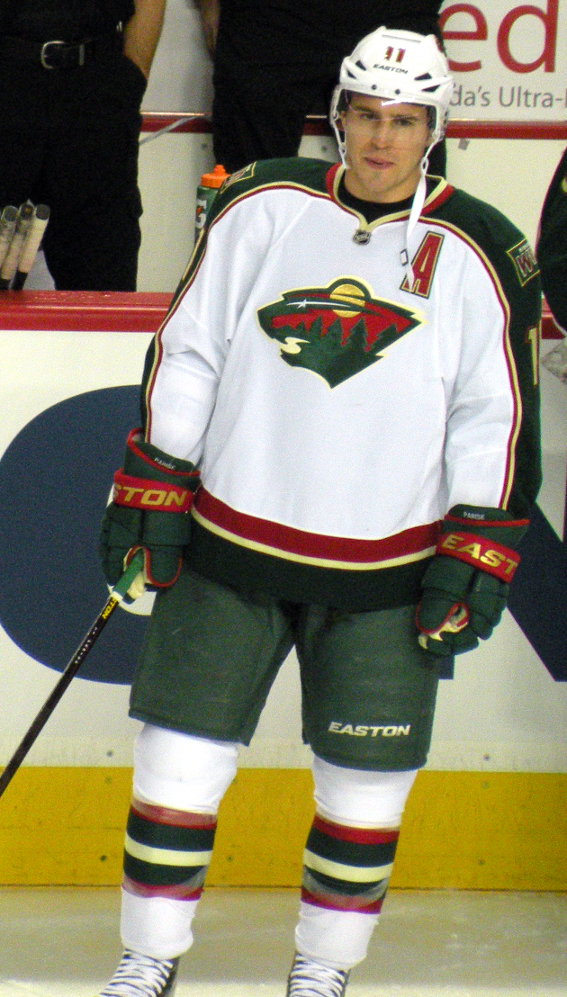
Zach Parise, with the Minnesota Wild

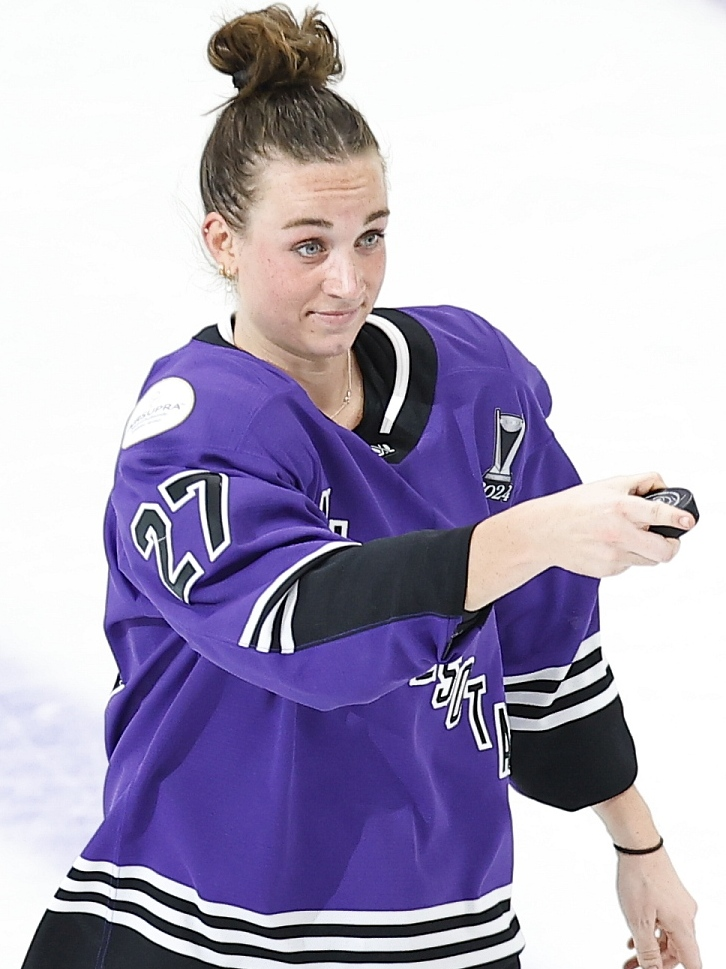
Taylor Heise with PWHL Minnesota in 2024

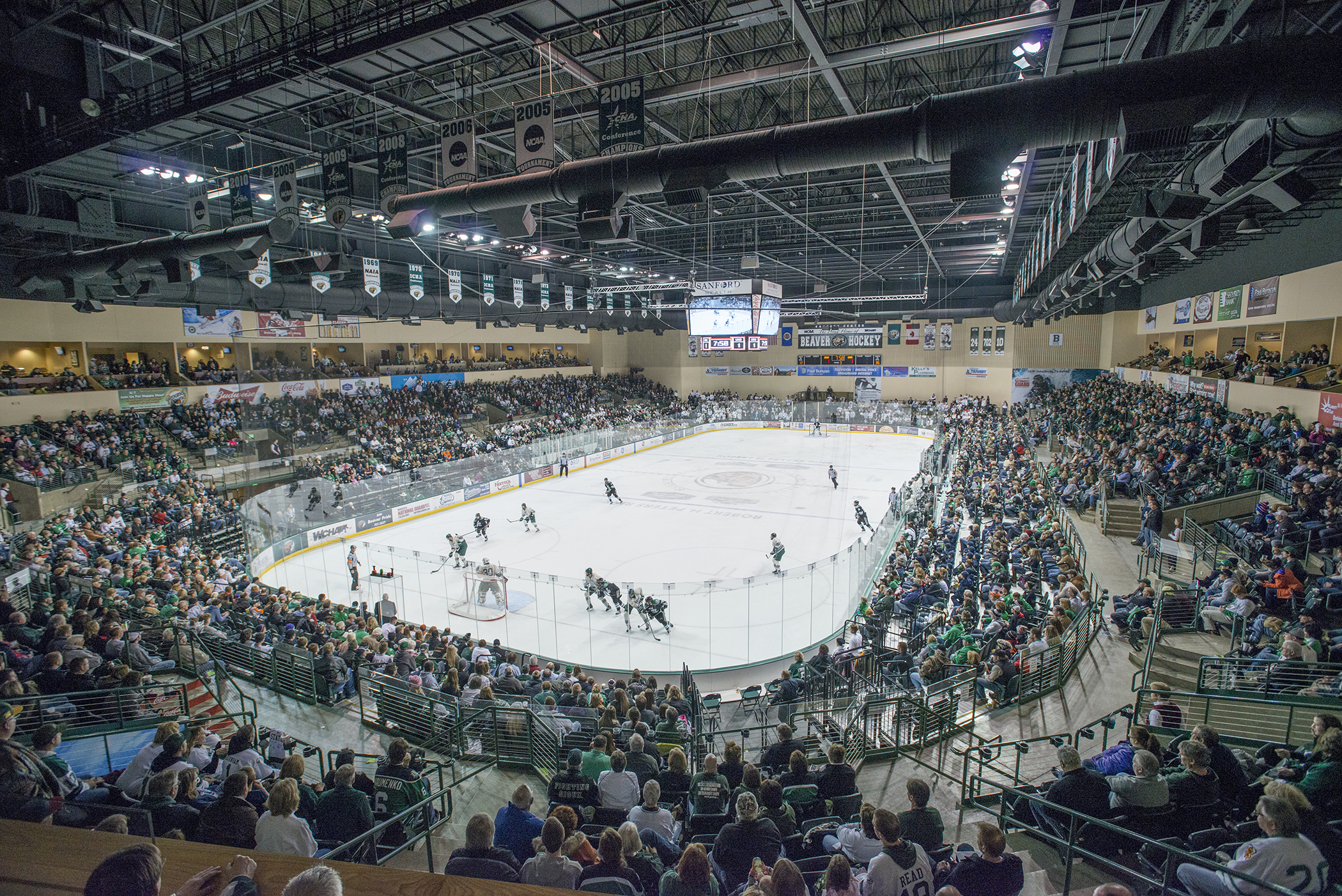
A game at the Sanford Center in Bemidji

=== Active ===
Professional

| Team | City | League | Arena | Founded |
|---|---|---|---|---|
| Minnesota Wild | Saint Paul | NHL | Grand Casino Arena | 2000 |
| Minnesota Frost | Saint Paul | PWHL | Grand Casino Arena | 2023 |

Collegiate

| Team | City | Gender | Division | League | Arena | Founded |
|---|---|---|---|---|---|---|
| Minnesota | Minneapolis | Men's | NCAA Division I | Big Ten | 3M Arena at Mariucci | 1920 |
| Minnesota | Minneapolis | Women's | NCAA Division I | WCHA | Ridder Arena | 1997 |
| St. Thomas | Minneapolis | Men's | NCAA Division I | CCHA | St. Thomas Ice Arena | 1920 |
| St. Thomas | Minneapolis | Women's | NCAA Division I | WCHA | St. Thomas Ice Arena | 1998 |
| Minnesota Duluth | Duluth | Men's | NCAA Division I | NCHC | AMSOIL Arena | 1930 |
| Minnesota Duluth | Duluth | Women's | NCAA Division I | WCHA | AMSOIL Arena | 1999 |
| St. Cloud State | St. Cloud | Men's | NCAA Division I | NCHC | Herb Brooks National Hockey Center | 1931 |
| St. Cloud State | St. Cloud | Women's | NCAA Division I | WCHA | Herb Brooks National Hockey Center | 1998 |
| Bemidji State | Bemidji | Men's | NCAA Division I | CCHA | Sanford Center | 1947 |
| Bemidji State | Bemidji | Women's | NCAA Division I | WCHA | Sanford Center | 1998 |
| Minnesota State | Mankato | Men's | NCAA Division I | CCHA | Mayo Clinic Health System Event Center | 1969 |
| Minnesota State | Mankato | Women's | NCAA Division I | WCHA | Mayo Clinic Health System Event Center | 1998 |
| Hamline | Saint Paul | Men's | NCAA Division III | MIAC | TRIA Rink | 1919 |
| Hamline | Saint Paul | Women's | NCAA Division III | MIAC | TRIA Rink | 2000 |
| Saint John's | Collegeville | Men's | NCAA Division III | MIAC | Herb Brooks National Hockey Center | 1920 |
| Saint Benedict | St. Joseph | Women's | NCAA Division III | MIAC | St. Cloud Municipal Athletic Complex | 1997 |
| Saint Mary's | Winona | Men's | NCAA Division III | MIAC | SMU Ice Arena | 1926 |
| Saint Mary's | Winona | Women's | NCAA Division III | MIAC | SMU Ice Arena | 1998 |
| Augsburg | Minneapolis | Men's | NCAA Division III | MIAC | Augsburg Ice Arena | 1927 |
| Augsburg | Minneapolis | Women's | NCAA Division III | MIAC | Augsburg Ice Arena | 1995 |
| Concordia | Moorhead | Men's | NCAA Division III | MIAC | Moorhead Sports Center | 1927 |
| Concordia | Moorhead | Women's | NCAA Division III | MIAC | Moorhead Sports Center | 1999 |
| St. Olaf | Northfield | Men's | NCAA Division III | MIAC | St. Olaf Ice Arena | 1927 |
| St. Olaf | Northfield | Women's | NCAA Division III | MIAC | St. Olaf Ice Arena | 2000 |
| Gustavus Adolphus | St. Peter | Men's | NCAA Division III | MIAC | Student Center Drive | 1936 |
| Gustavus Adolphus | St. Peter | Women's | NCAA Division III | MIAC | Student Center Drive | 1997 |
| St. Scholastica | Duluth | Men's | NCAA Division III | MIAC | Mars-Lakeview Arena | 1972 |
| St. Scholastica | Duluth | Women's | NCAA Division III | MIAC | Mars-Lakeview Arena | 2010 |
| Bethel | Arden Hills | Men's | NCAA Division III | MIAC | Bethel University Arena @ National Sports Center | 1979 |
| Bethel | Arden Hills | Men's | NCAA Division III | MIAC | Bethel University Arena @ National Sports Center | 1999 |
| St. Catherine | Saint Paul | Women's | NCAA Division III | MIAC | Drake Arena | 1998 |

Junior

| Team | City | League | Arena | Founded |
|---|---|---|---|---|
| Granite City Lumberjacks | Sauk Rapids | NA3HL | Armadillo Deck Sports Arena | 2007 |
| Alexandria Blizzard | Alexandria | NA3HL | Runestone Community Center | 2012 |
| Minnesota Mullets | Minneapolis | USPHL | Augsburg University Ice Arena | 2017 ^{†} |
| Rochester Grizzlies | Rochester | NA3HL | Rochester Rec Center | 2018 ^{†} |
| Minnesota Loons | Breezy Point | NA3HL | Breezy Point Ice Arena | 2021 ^{†} |
| Isanti Outlaws | Isanti | USPHL | Isanti Ice Arena | 2022 ^{†} |
| Minnesota Mallards | Forest Lake | NAHL | Forest Lake Sports Center | 2024 |

=== Inactive ===
Professional

| Team | City | League | Years active | Fate |
|---|---|---|---|---|
| Duluth Hornets | Duluth | AAHA; USAHA; CAHL; AHA | 1914–1916; 1920–1925; 1925–1926; 1926–1932 | Wichita Blue Jays |
| St. Paul Saints | Saint Paul | AAHA; USAHA; CAHL; AHA; CHL; AHA | 1915–1916; 1920–1925; 1925–1926; 1926–1931; 1931–1935; 1935–1942 | Defunct |
| Eveleth Reds | Eveleth | Independent; USAHA; CAHA | 1919–1920; 1920–1925; 1925–1926 | Eveleth Rangers |
| Minneapolis Millers | Minneapolis | CAHL; AHA; CHL; AHA | 1925–1926; 1926–1931; 1931–1935; 1935–1942 | Defunct |
| Eveleth Rangers | Eveleth | CHL; IAHL; NAHL | 1931–1935; 1936–1939; 1946–1951 | Defunct |
| St. Paul Saints (second) | Saint Paul | USHL | 1945–1951 | Defunct |
| Minneapolis Millers (second) | Minneapolis | IHL | 1959–1963 ^{†} | Defunct |
| St. Paul Saints (third) | Saint Paul | IHL | 1959–1963 | Defunct |
| Minneapolis Bruins | Minneapolis | CPHL | 1963–1965 | Oklahoma City Blazers |
| St. Paul / Minnesota Rangers | Saint Paul | CPHL | 1963–1966 | Defunct |
| Minnesota North Stars | Bloomington | NHL | 1967–1993 | Dallas Stars |
| Minnesota Fighting Saints | Saint Paul | WHA | 1972–1976 | Defunct |
| Minnesota Fighting Saints (second) | Saint Paul | WHA | 1976–1977 ^{†} | Defunct |
| St. Paul Fighting Saints | Saint Paul | AHA | 1992–1993 | Defunct |
| Minnesota Iron Rangers | Hibbing | AHA | 1992–1993 | Defunct |
| Minnesota Moose | Saint Paul | IHL | 1994–1996 | Manitoba Moose |
| Minnesota Whitecaps | Richfield | WWHL; Independent; PHF | 2004–2011; 2011–2018; 2018–2023 | Defunct |

Senior

| Team | City | League | Years active | Fate |
|---|---|---|---|---|
| Warroad Lakers | Warroad | Various | 1946–1997 | Warroad Islanders |
| Rochester Mustangs | Rochester | USHL | 1961–1970 | Defunct |
| Warroad Islanders | Warroad | Independent | 2001–2003 | Defunct |

Collegiate

| Team | City | Gender | Division | League | Years active |
|---|---|---|---|---|---|
| Carleton | Northfield | Men's | NCAA Division I | MIAC | 1919–1925 |
| Macalester | Saint Paul | Men's | NCAA Division II | MIAC | 1919–1975 |
| Minnesota–Crookston | Crookston | Men's | NCAA Division II | MCHA | 1998–2009 |

Junior

| Team | City | League | Years active | Fate |
|---|---|---|---|---|
| Minnesota / Saint Paul Jr. Stars | Saint Paul | TBJHL | 1971–1973 | St. Paul Vulcans |
| St. Paul / Twin Cities Vulcans | Saint Paul | MWJHL; USHL | 1973–1978; 1978–2000 ^{†} | Tri-City Storm |
| Austin Mavericks | Austin | MWJHL; USHL | 1974–1977; 1977–1985 | Rochester Mustangs |
| Bloomington Junior Stars | Bloomington | MWJHL; USHL | 1975–1977; 1977–1984 | Minneapolis Junior Stars |
| Minneapolis Junior Stars | Minneapolis | USHL | 1984–1985 | Defunct |
| Rochester Mustangs | Rochester | USHL | 1985–2000 ^{†} | Defunct |
| East Metro Lakers | White Bear Lake | MnJHL | 1993–2000 | St. Paul Lakers |
| North Metro / Minnesota Owls | Isanti | MnJHL | 1993–2015 | Defunct |
| Fargo-Moorhead Bears | Moorhead | USHL | 1995–1996 | Defunct |
| Fargo-Moorhead Ice Sharks | Moorhead | USHL | 1996–2000 | Chicago Steel |
| Minnesota Ice Hawks | Le Sueur; Rochester | MnJHL | 1996–2002; 2002–2009 | Rochester Ice Hawks |
| Iron Range Yellow Jackets | Coleraine | MnJHL | 1999–2002 | Defunct |
| St. Paul Lakers | Saint Paul | MnJHL | 2000–2009 ^{†} | Edina Lakers |
| Minnesota Wildcats | Maple Grove | MnJHL | 2005–2011 ^{†} | Defunct |
| Edina Lakers | Edina | MnJHL | 2009–2014 ^{†} | Forest Lake Lakers |
| Rochester Ice Hawks | Rochester | MnJHL; NA3HL | 2009–2015 ^{†} 2015–2018 | Rochester Grizzlies |
| Maple Grove Energy | Maple Grove | MnJHL | 2011–2015 | Blaine Energy |
| Breezy Point North Stars | Breezy Point | NA3HL | 2012–2020 | Minnesota Loons |
| Minnesota Magicians | Richfield | NAHL | 2013–2022 ^{†} | Wisconsin Windigo |
| Forest Lake Lakers | Forest Lake | MnJHL; USPHL | 2014–2015 ^{†} 2015–2017 | Minnesota Mullets |
| Blaine Energy | Blaine | USPHL | 2015–2017 ^{†} | Defunct |
| Rum River Mallards | Isanti | USPHL | 2018–2022 ^{†} | Isanti Outlaws |

† relocated from elsewhere

=== Timeline ===
Active Active (out of state)

== Players ==
Minnesota has by far the largest number of hockey players in the United States. With more the 58,000 people associated with USA Hockey in 2023, Minnesota is home to more the 10% of the nation's registered ice hockey players. That number is nearly 13,000 more than the next closest state (Massachusetts) but does not include the approximately 6,500 high school players who are not directly affiliated with the national program. While a few other states have comparable percentages in terms of engagement, Minnesota still heads the list with about 1.14% of residents being active hockey players, or about 1 out of every 90 people.

Unsurprisingly, as the largest population area in the state, the Minneapolis-Saint Paul region is home to a majority of the players from Minnesota. Outside its confines, several regions have and continue to produce notable ice hockey players. The Iron Range, between Grand Rapids and Hoyt Lakes, has long been a font of ice hockey talent. Many others have come from along the northern border and the Mississippi River. However. not every portion of the state has seen success in this respect. The southwest corner of the state, between the borders with Iowa, South Dakota and the Minnesota River has yet to produce any notable players.

This high and prolonged interest in the game has resulted in many native Minnesotans achieving notoriety in the sport with some being known nationally or even internationally.

- Frank Brimsek: perhaps the first American player to become a star in the NHL, Brimsek led the league with 10 shutouts as a rookie, earning him the nickname "Mr. Zero". He would backstop the Boston Bruins to two Stanley Cup championships and was inducted into the Hockey Hall of Fame in 1966. He is routinely rated as the best American goaltender of the 20th century.
- Herb Brooks: led Minnesota to its first three national championships in the 1970s before coaching the Miracle on Ice team to the gold medal. He continued to coach afterwards, leading three separate teams over the next 20 years and was inducted into the Hockey Hall of Fame in 2006.
- Neal Broten: a star player at the University of Minnesota, Broten was a member of the US Olympic team in 1980. He returned to Minnesota and was named as the first recipient of the Hobey Baker Award in 1981. After graduating he embarked on a long professional career that culminated with a Stanley Cup championship with the New Jersey Devils in 1995.
- Phil Housley: Long-time NHL defenseman, amassed over 1,200 points in his career. Made many appearances for the U.S. national team over the years and helped the team win the 1996 World Cup. Was inducted into both the IIHF Hall of Fame (2012) and Hockey Hall of Fame (2015).
- Willard Ikola: starred as the starting goaltender for Eveleth High School leading the team to three consecutive undefeated seasons (1948–50). He continued that success at Michigan, helping the team win back-to-back national championships. In 1958 he became the head coach at Edina High School and become one of the most successful high school coaches in the history of Minnesota hockey, winning eight state championships in his 33-year tenure.
- Jamie Langenbrunner: a star in high school, he was drafted by the Dallas Stars after averaging over 3 points per game as a junior. Langenbrunner would go on to have a 16-year career in the NHL, winning 2 Stanley Cups and won a silver medal at the 2010 Winter Olympics.
- John Mayasich: the all-time leading scorer at the University of Minnesota. Mayasich led the team to consecutive runner-up finishes in 1953 and 1954 while becoming the first person to lead the nation in scoring for consecutive seasons. He won a silver medal at the 1956 Olympic Games and a gold in 1960.

=== Notable players by city ===
Location of cities
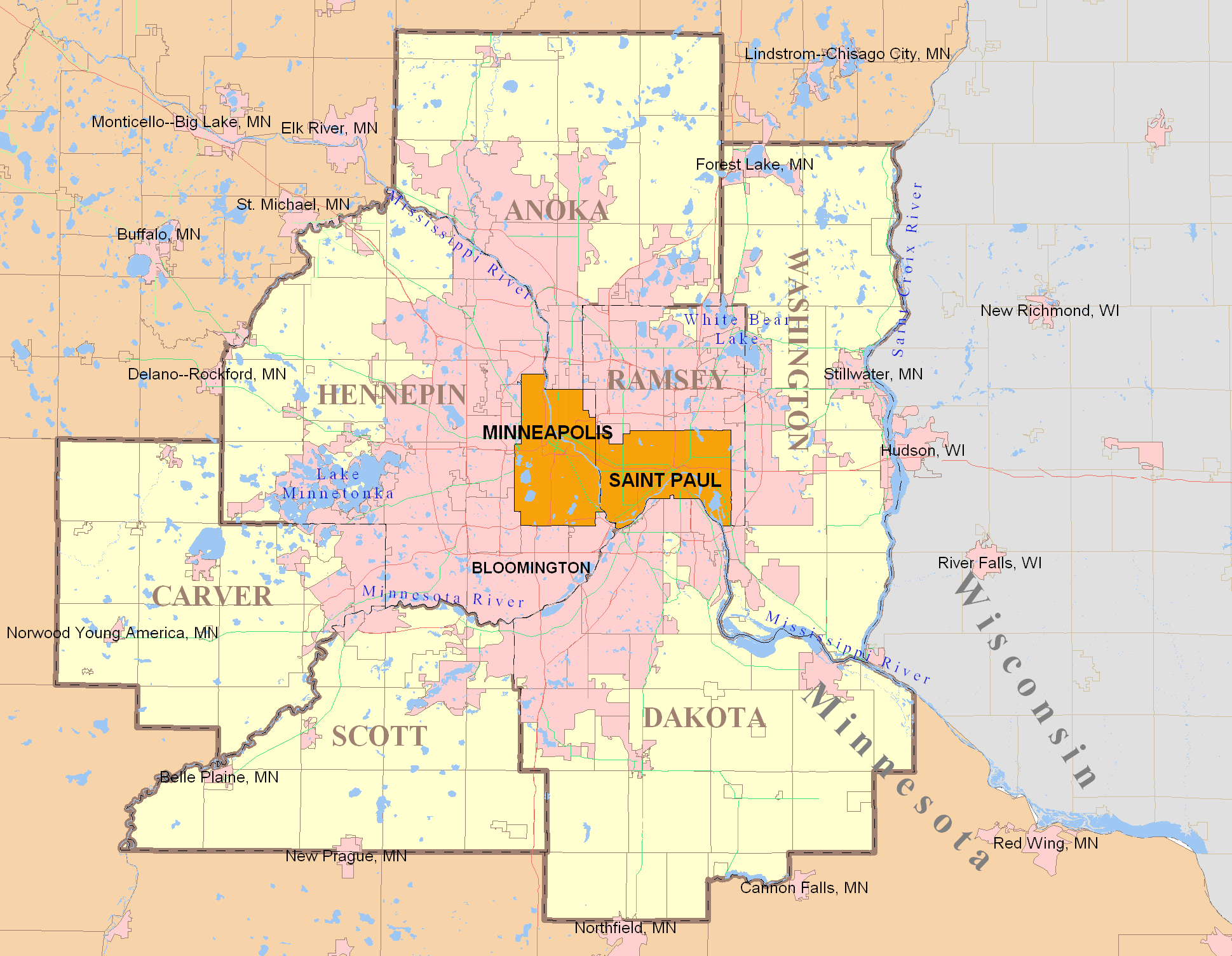
Minneapolis–Saint Paul region

Ada

- Keith Hanson

Albert Lea

- Craig Dahl

Alexandria

- Josh Meyers

Andover

- Wyatt Kaiser
- Amanda Trunzo

Anoka

- Steve Alley
- Jeffrey Hymanson
- Matt Sorteberg

Apple Valley

- Mike Carman ^{†}
- Daniel Daikawa
- Hudson Fasching ^{†}
- Karl Goehring
- Roger Grillo
- Josh Hauge
- Dan Sexton

Appleton

- Don Roberts

Aurora

- Bob Lakso

Austin

- Tim Kirby
- Bob Motzko

Babbitt

- Buzz Schneider

Baudette

- Keith Ballard
- Alex Lyon
- Wally Olds ^{†}

Baxter

- Mitch McLain

Bemidji

- Matt DeMarchi
- Joe Motzko
- George Pelawa

Blaine

- Nick Bjugstad
- Brandon Bochenski
- Jonny Brodzinski
- Emily Brown
- Matt Hendricks
- Mike Pudlick
- Taylor Turnquist

Bloomington

- Bob Bergloff ^{†}
- Ben Clymer
- Brian Connelly
- Mike Crowley
- Joseph Cure
- Tom Gilbert
- Tim Harrer
- Tyler Hirsch
- Don Jackson ^{†}
- Erik Johnson
- Peter Mueller
- Mark Parrish
- Tom Pederson
- Bryan Schmidt
- Ryan Stoa
- Dan Trebil

Bovey

- Adam Hauser

Brainerd

- Josh Archibald ^{†}
- Cole Smith

Brooklyn Park

- Casey Borer ^{†}
- Tim Jackman ^{†}
- Kate Schipper
- Krissy Wendell-Pohl
- Ben Youds

Buffalo

- David Marshall

Burnsville

- Brock Boeser
- Sean Curry
- Nate DiCasmirro
- Mike Lundin
- Todd Okerlund
- Mark Osiecki
- Tyler Sheehy
- Jarred Tinordi
- Eddie Wittchow

Calumet

- Mike Antonovich

Cambridge

- Jake Bischoff

Centerville

- Tyler Pitlick

Chanhassen

- Stu Bickel
- Rory Guilday
- Rachel Ramsey
- Mike Reilly ^{†}

Chaska

- Bobby Brink
- Jimmy Snuggerud
- Odeen Tufto

Chisago City

- Chad Anderson

Chisholm

- Rob Pallin
- David Tomassoni ^{†}

Cloquet

- Teemu Kivihalme
- Jamie Langenbrunner ^{†}
- Sadie Lundquist
- Corey Millen
- Derek Plante

Coleraine

- Ken Gernander
- Gino Guyer
- Frank Serratore
- Tom Serratore
- Andy Sertich

Coon Rapids

- Josh Langfeld
- Matt Loen
- Riley Tufte

Cottage Grove

- Seth Appert
- Jack Dougherty ^{†}
- Allie Morse
- Scott Swanson

Crookston

- Tim Bergland
- Everett McGowan
- John Noah

Crystal

- Todd Richards
- Travis Richards

Delano

- Ben Meyers

Detroit Lakes

- Garrett Raboin
- Barry Tallackson ^{†}

Duluth

- Nicholas Angell
- Philip Beaulieu
- Ashley Birdsall
- Rob Bordson
- Jack Connolly
- Cade Fairchild ^{†}
- Zack Fitzgerald
- Derek Forbort
- Stan Gilbertson
- Bob Hall
- Mark Heaslip
- Bob Hill
- Sean Hill
- Phil Hoene
- Rusty Ingersoll
- Mike Kemp
- Brett Larson
- Drew LeBlanc
- Rick Mrozik
- Ralph Romano ^{†}
- Maddie Rooney
- Larry Ross
- Dan Stauber
- Emma Stauber
- Robb Stauber
- Dean Talafous
- Dominic Toninato
- Phil Verchota
- Jim Watt
- Andy Welinski
- Burr Williams ^{†}
- Butch Williams
- Tom Williams
- Frank Winters

Eagan

- Dan Bjornlie
- Joseph LaBate
- Rob Rankin
- Natalie Snodgrass

East Grand Forks

- Haley Mack

Eden Prairie

- Carly Bullock
- Danny Kristo
- Jackson LaCombe
- Nick Leddy
- Casey Mittelstadt ^{†}
- Chad Rau
- Kyle Rau
- Naomi Rogge
- Nick Seeler

Edina

- Kieffer Bellows
- Corinne Buie
- Dick Burg
- Brian Burke ^{†}
- Brad DeFauw
- Dave Dornseif
- Mike Farrell
- Joe Finley
- Steven Fogarty ^{†}
- Jeff Frazee
- Ben Hankinson
- Casey Hankinson
- Chris Hartsburg
- Michael Lauen
- Anders Lee
- David Maley ^{†}
- Jamie McBain
- Bruce McIntosh
- Mike Muller
- Marty Nanne
- Craig Norwich
- Kevin Nugent ^{†}
- Bill Nyrop ^{†}
- Mel Pearson ^{†}
- Chase Polacek
- Paul Ranheim ^{†}
- Jenny Schmidgall-Potter ^{†}
- Luc Snuggerud
- Ben Stafford
- Jeff Teal
- Ryan Thang ^{†}
- J. T. Wyman

Elk River

- Blake Hillman
- Matt Kiersted
- Joel Otto
- Nick Perbix
- Nate Prosser

Ely

- David Merhar

Esko

- Karson Kuhlman

Eveleth

- Rudy Ahlin
- Frank Brimsek
- Neil Celley
- Chuck Delich
- Roland DePaul
- Pat Finnegan
- Andy Gambucci
- Gus Hendrickson
- Craig Homola
- Willard Ikola
- Bill Kangas
- Mike Karakas ^{†}
- Sam LoPresti ^{†}
- John Mariucci
- John Matchefts
- John Mayasich
- Aldo Palazzari
- Doug Palazzari
- Joe Papike
- Mark Pavelich
- Connie Pleban
- Norbert Sterle
- Al Suomi
- Ronn Tomassoni
- Tom Yurkovich

Excelsior

- Andy Jones
- Vinni Lettieri
- Sydney Rossman
- Grace Zumwinkle

Faribault

- Ben Barr
- Patrick Eaves ^{†}
- Seth Helgeson
- Brady Murray ^{†}
- Sarah Murray
- Drew Stafford ^{†}

Farmington

- Drew Helleson

Forest Lake

- C. J. Suess ^{†}

Fridley

- Mikey Anderson
- Chris Dahlquist
- Jarod Palmer

Gilbert

- Dave Skalko

Golden Valley

- Jordan Leopold

Grand Rapids

- Bill Baker
- Jon Casey
- Alex Goligoski
- Mike Guentzel
- Adam Johnson
- Kurt Kleinendorst
- Scot Kleinendorst
- Don Lucia
- Chris Marinucci
- Jeff Nielsen
- Kirk Nielsen
- Tom Peluso
- Jon Rohloff ^{†}
- Todd Rohloff
- Hunter Shepard
- Steve Wagner
- Patrick White

Ham Lake

- Trevor Frischmon

Hastings

- Taylor Chorney
- Aaron Fox
- Derek Stepan
- Jeff Taffe
- Daniel Welch

Hermantown

- Cole Koepke
- Neal Pionk
- Dylan Samberg

Hibbing

- Joe Bretto
- Milton Brink
- Bob Collyard
- Kelly Fairchild
- Gary Gambucci
- Chuck Grillo
- Joe Micheletti ^{†}
- Pat Micheletti
- Eddie Miller
- John Perpich
- Scott Perunovich
- John Petroske
- John Polich
- Mike Polich
- Scott Sandelin

Hinckley

- Paul Schaeffer

Hopkins

- Travis Boyd
- Jim Korn

Hoyt Lakes

- Matt Christensen

International Falls

- Dean Blais
- Kevin Constantine
- Mike Curran
- Dan Dilworth
- Richard Dougherty ^{†}
- Brady Hjelle
- Dave Laurion
- Bob Mason
- Jack McDonald
- Robert Rompre
- Gary Sampson ^{†}
- Cal Sandbeck
- Neil Sheehy ^{†}
- Tim Sheehy ^{†}

La Crescent

- Eriah Hayes

Lake City

- Taylor Heise

Lakeville

- Justin Kloos
- Chelsea Laden
- Charlie Lindgren
- Sam Malinski
- Jake Oettinger
- Ryan Poehling
- Jordan Schroeder
- Brady Skjei

Leonidas

- Wally Grant

Little Falls

- Ben Hanowski

Mahtomedi

- Jim Boo ^{†}
- Mike Greeder

Mankato

- Rebekah Kolstad

Maple Grove

- Brock Faber
- Jordan Gross
- Joe Jensen

Maplewood

- Audra Morrison
- Jim O'Brien
- Allie Thunstrom

Medina

- Ryan Bischel

Mendota Heights

- George Awada

Minneapolis

- Andrew Alberts
- Russ Anderson
- David Backes
- Todd Bjorkstrand
- Jack Blatherwick
- Robert Boeser
- John C. Burton
- Walter Bush
- Gene Campbell
- Tom Chorske
- Cully Dahlstrom
- Joe Dziedzic
- Ben Eaves
- David Fischer
- Jake Gardiner
- Brian Halonen
- Peter Hayek
- Mike Hiltner
- Tom Hirsch
- David Jensen
- Paul Jensen
- Bob Johnson
- Virgil Johnson
- Bill Klatt
- Tom Kurvers
- Philip LaBatte
- Reed Larson
- Bob Lindberg
- Bob Lundeen
- Paul Martin
- Jake McCoy
- Bill Moe ^{†}
- John Morrison
- Ronald Naslund
- Hub Nelson
- Allan Opsahl
- Arnold Oss
- Zach Parise
- Toby Petersen
- Lance Pitlick
- Mike Ramsey
- Troy Riddle
- Jeff Rotsch
- Marsh Ryman
- Shaun Sabol
- Ed Saugestad
- Mike Schwartz
- Brad Shelstad
- John Sheridan
- John Simus
- Matt Smaby
- Larry H. Smith
- John Taft
- Matt Tennyson
- Hal Trumble
- Jim Westby
- Erik Westrum
- Pat Westrum
- Mike Wong

Minnetonka

- Sydney Baldwin
- Jack Hillen
- Steve Martinson
- Sidney Morin
- Jimmy Schuldt
- Dave Snuggerud

Minnetrista

- Emma Polusny

Moorhead

- Michael Bitzer
- Jason Blake
- Will Borgen
- Mark Cullen
- Ryan Kraft ^{†}
- Brian Lee
- Chris VandeVelde

Moose Lake

- Mark Vichorek
- Taylor Vichorek

Mound

- Chris Kenady
- Taylor Matson

Mounds View

- Meghan Lorence
- Oliver Moore

New Brighton

- Scott Bjugstad
- Steve Freeman
- Sam Hentges
- Ric Schafer

New Hope

- Jim Johnson
- Chris Olson

New Ulm

- Jamie Hoffmann

Nisswa

- Carl Sneep

North Oaks

- Sydney Brodt
- Mike Hoeffel

North St. Paul

- Stephanie Anderson

Northfield

- Edward Fitzgerald

Oakdale

- Peter Krieger
- Frank Sanders

Orono

- Rachael Drazan

Osseo

- Andy Hedlund

Park Rapids

- McKenna Brand

Pengilly

- Mike Peluso

Plymouth

- Grant Besse
- Ben Blood
- Dani Cameranesi
- Laura Halldorson
- Matt Hussey ^{†}
- Evan Kaufmann
- Kent Patterson
- Derek Peltier
- Rem Pitlick ^{†}
- Dennis Vaske ^{†}
- Blake Wheeler
- Maddie Woo

Prior Lake

- Scott Reedy

Red Lake

- Gary Sargent

Red Wing

- Rose Alleva
- Nicole Schammel

Richfield

- Steve Christoff
- Mark Guggenberger
- Brett Hauer
- Darby Hendrickson
- Troy Jutting
- Lynn Olson
- David Shute
- Tim Thomas

Robbinsdale

- Trent Klatt
- Leonard Lilyholm

Rochester

- Andy Canzanello
- Pat Ferschweiler
- Guy Gosselin
- Jeff Jakaitis
- Jim Johannson
- John Johannson
- Bryce Lampman
- Shjon Podein
- John Pohl
- Eric Strobel
- Colin Stuart
- Mark Stuart
- Mike Stuart
- Jake Taylor
- Doug Zmolek

Rogers

- Matt Hellickson
- Dan Hinote ^{†}

Roseau

- Earl Anderson
- Mike Baumgartner
- Rube Bjorkman
- Aaron Broten
- Neal Broten
- Paul Broten
- Dustin Byfuglien ^{†}
- Blane Comstock
- Bryan Erickson
- Luke Erickson
- Mike Lee ^{†}
- Bryan Lundbohm
- David Lundbohm
- Aaron Ness
- Dale Smedsmo

Rosemount

- J. T. Brown ^{†}
- Tim Conboy
- Tom Preissing ^{†}
- Charlie Stramel
- Ryan Walters

Roseville

- Joey Anderson
- Winny Brodt-Brown
- Chelsey Brodt-Rosenthal
- Ronda Curtin Engelhardt
- Chris McAlpine
- Marty Sertich
- Steve Short
- Lee Stecklein
- Steve Ulseth
- Mark Van Guilder

Saint Paul

- Wendell R. Anderson
- Les Auge
- Adam Berkhoel
- Alana Blahoski
- Bud Boeringer
- Brian Bonin
- David Brooks
- Herb Brooks
- Brad Buetow
- Bill Butters
- Paul Castner
- Anthony Conroy
- Jim Cunningham
- Luke Curtin
- Natalie Darwitz
- Doc DelCastillo
- Bob Dill
- Derek Eastman
- Craig Falkman
- Ryan Flynn
- Tom Gorence
- Craig Hanmer
- David Hanson ^{†}
- Bret Hedican
- Paul Holmgren
- Phil Housley
- Steve Janaszak
- Nick Jensen
- Craig Johnson
- Matt Koalska
- Dave Langevin
- Jack McCartan
- Rob McClanahan
- Ryan McDonagh
- Jim McElmury
- K'Andre Miller
- Warren Miller
- Kyle Okposo
- Bob Paradise
- Dick Paradise
- Jeff Parker
- Dave Peterson ^{†}
- Chris Pryor
- Tom Quinlan
- Jim Rantz
- Damian Rhodes
- Tom Roe
- Steve Rohlik
- Jeff Romfo
- Craig Sarner
- Bill Schafhauser
- Gary Schmalzbauer
- James Sedin
- Ray Shero
- Terry Skrypek
- Lefty Smith
- Alex Stalock
- Warren Strelow
- Kay Todd Jr.
- Sean Toomey
- Jerry Trooien
- Tom Vannelli
- Tom Wahman
- Jim Warner
- Cyril Weidenborner
- Doug Woog
- Ken Yackel
- John Young
- Tom Younghans

Sauk Rapids

- Ethan Prow
- Nate Raduns

Savage

- Jack Ahcan
- A. J. Thelen

Shoreview

- Andrew Carroll

Shorewood

- John Curry

Silver Bay

- Rusty Fitzgerald ^{†}

South St. Paul

- Terry Abram
- Justin Faulk
- Zach Palmquist
- Adam Wilcox

St. Cloud

- Chris Harrington
- Cory Laylin
- Kurt Sauer
- Michael Sauer
- Anne Schleper
- Nate Schmidt

St. Louis Park

- Don Brose
- Angie Keseley
- Jim Mattson
- Edwyn Owen
- Erik Rasmussen ^{†}

St. Michael

- Ben Gordon
- Paige Voight

Stacy

- Hunter Miska

Stillwater

- Sara Bustad
- Chris Casto
- Jackson Cates
- Noah Cates
- Casey Nelson
- Tom Porter
- Mitch Reinke

Sturgeon Lake

- Clay Wilson

Thief River Falls

- Robert Baker
- Michael Forney
- Wyatt Smith

Tonka Bay

- Justin Holl

Two Harbors

- Leroy Goldsworthy
- Frank Pond

Vadnais Heights

- Justin Bostrom
- Hannah Brandt
- Marissa Brandt ^{†}
- Justin Braun

Virginia

- Jack Carlson
- Jeff Carlson
- Steve Carlson
- Matt Cullen
- John Gruden
- John Harrington
- Pete LoPresti
- Matt Niskanen
- Harold Paulsen
- Mike Sertich
- Steve Sertich

Wayzata

- Jaxson Stauber

Warroad

- Henry Boucha
- Bill Christian
- Dave Christian
- Gordon Christian
- Roger Christian
- Chad Erickson ^{†}
- Alan Hangsleben
- Cal Marvin
- Gigi Marvin ^{†}
- Brock Nelson ^{†}
- Larry Olimb

West St. Paul

- Paul Johnson
- Randy Skarda

White Bear Lake

- Ryan Carter
- Mike Gibbons
- Moose Goheen
- Tim Hambly
- Eric Hartzell
- Matt Henderson
- Elwin Romnes
- Pat Shea ^{†}
- David Tanabe

Williams

- Clarence Schmidt

Woodbury

- David Eddy
- Jake Guentzel ^{†}
- Gabe Guentzel
- Brennan Menell

Raised Elsewhere

- Will Acton
- Roxy Beaudro
- Mark Johnson
- Mike McNeill
- Jason Zucker

† relocated from elsewhere.
