= List of Phoenix Roadrunners (IHL) players =

This is a list of players who have played at least one game for the Phoenix Roadrunners (1989–90 to 1996–97) of the International Hockey League (IHL).

:Name: (years played): position: birth date: Home Town

== A ==
- Peter Ahola (1991–1992) – defense, 1968-05-14 Espoo, Finland
- Brad Aitken (1989–1990) – left wing, 1967-10-30 Scarborough, ONT
- Mel Angelstad (1995–1996) – left wing, 1971-10-31 Saskatoon, SASK
- Mark Astley (1996–1997) – defense, 1969-03-30 Calgary, ALTA

== B ==
- Ruslan Batyrshin (1995–1997) – defense, 1975-02-19 Moscow, Russia
- Darren Beals (1989–1990) – goalie, 1968-08-28 Dartmouth, NS
- Frederik Beaubien (1995–1996) – goalie, 1975-04-01 Lauzon, PQ
- Nick Beaulieu (1989–1991) – left wing, 1968-08-19 Rimouski, PQ
- Jerome Bechard (1990–1991) – left wing, 1969-03-30 Regina, SASK
- Hugo Belanger (1996–1997) – left wing, 1970-05-28 St. Hubert, PQ
- Aki-Petteri Berg (1995–1997) – defense, 1977-07-28 Turku, Finland
- Bob Berg (1991–1993) – left wing, 1970-07-02 Beamsville, ONT
- Mike Berger (1989–1990) – defense, 1967-06-02 Edmonton, ALTA
- Jean-Claude Bergeron (1996–1997) – goalie, 1968-10-14 Hauterive, PQ
- Andy Bezeau (1994–1995) – left wing, 1970-03-30 Saint John, NB
- Scott Bjugstad (1990–1993) – forward, 1961-06-02 St. Paul, MN
- Arto Blomsten (1994–1996) – defense, 1965-03-16 Vaasa, Finland
- John Blue (1989–1996) – goalie, 1966-02-19 Huntington Beach, CA
- Mike Boback (1995–1996) – centre, 1970-08-13 Mt. Clemens, MI
- Mike Bodnarchuk (1993–1994) – right wing, 1970-03-26 Bramalea, ONT
- Derek Booth (1991–1992) – defense, 1970-07-19 Niagara Falls, ONT
- Philippe Boucher (1995–1996) – defense, 1973-03-24 St. Apollinaire, PQ
- Bruce Boudreau (1989–1990) – centre, 1955-01-09 Toronto, ONT
- Frank Breault (1991–1993) – right wing, 1967-05-11 Acton Vale, PQ
- Tim Breslin (1991–1994) – left wing, 1967-12-08 Downers Grove, IL
- Dan Brierly (1996–1997) – defense, 1974-01-23 Brewster, NY
- Neal Broten (1996–1997) – centre, 1959-11-29 Roseau, MN
- Scott Brower (1989–1990) – goalie, 1964-09-26 Viking, ALTA
- Kevin Brown (1994–1996) – right wing, 1974-05-11 Birmingham, England
- Rob Brown (1994–1995) – right wing, 1968-04-10 Kingston, ONT
- Sean Brown (1994–1995) – right wing, 1973-03-30 Oshawa, ONT
- Jim Burton (1995–1996) – defense, 1963-11-06 Brantford, ONT
- Dan Bylsma (1994–1996) – right wing, 1970-09-19 Grand Haven, MI

== C ==
- Rene Chapdelaine (1990–1993) – defense, 1966-09-27 Weyburn, SASK
- Brian Chapman (1993–1997) – defense, 1968-02-10 Brockville, ONT
- Stephane Charbonneau (1993–1994) – right wing, 1970-06-27 St. Adele, PQ
- Jeff Chychrun (1991–1993) – defense, 1966-05-03 LaSalle, PQ
- Kerry Clark (1989–1990) – right wing, 1968-08-21 Kelvington, SASK
- Sylvain Couturier (1990–1993) – left wing, 1968-04-23 Greenfield Park, PQ
- Rob Cowie (1994–1996) – defense, 1967-11-03 Willowdale, ONT
- Phil Crowe (1992–1994) – right wing, 1970-04-14 Nanton, ALTA
- Ted Crowley (1996–1997) – defense, 1970-05-03 Concord, MA
- Dan Currie (1993–1995) – left wing, 1968-03-15 Burlington, ONT

== D ==
- Byron Dafoe (1994–1995) – goalie, 1971-02-25 Sussex, England
- Andrew Dale (1996–1997) – centre, 1976-02-16 Sudbury, ONT
- Mike DeCarle (1989–1990) – right wing, 1966-08-20 Covina, CA
- Shawn Dineen (1989–1990) – defense, 1958-03-01 Detroit, MI
- Paul DiPietro (1996–1997) – centre, 1970-09-08 Sault Ste. Marie, ONT
- Wayne Doucet (1994–1995) – left wing, 1970-06-19 Mississauga, ONT
- Scott Drevitch (1990–1991) – defense, 1965-09-09 Brookline, MA
- John Druce (1993–1994) – right wing, 1966-02-23 Peterborough, ONT
- Stan Drulia (1989–1990) – right wing, 1968-01-05 Elmira, NY
- Iain Duncan (1991–1992) – left wing, 1963-08-04 Toronto, ONT

== E ==
- Devin Edgerton (1994–1996) – centre, 1970-06-11 Kindersley, SASK
- David Emma (1996–1997) – right wing, 1969-01-14 Cranston, RI
- Randy Exelby (1989–1990) – goalie, 965-08-13 Toronto, ONT

== F ==
- Scott Feasby (1994–1995) – defense, 1970-11-20 Port Perry, ONT
- Craig Ferguson (1995–1996) – centre, 1970-04-08 Castro Valley, CA
- Larry Floyd (1989–1990) – right wing, 1961-05-01 Peterborough, ONT
- Marc Fortier (1992–1994) – centre, 1966-02-26 Windsor, PQ
- Joe Frederick (1996–1997) – right wing, 1969-06-08 Madison, WI

== G ==
- Michael Gaul (1994–1995) – defense, 1973-04-28 Lachine, PQ
- Todd Gillingham (1996–1997) – left wing, 1970-01-31 Labrodor City, NF
- Darryl Gilmour (1990–1993) – goalie, 1967-02-13 Winnipeg, MAN
- Mike Glover (1989–1990) – right wing, 1968-07-23 Ottawa, ONT
- Mario Gosselin (1990–1991) – goalie, 1963-06-15 Thetford Mines, PQ
- David Goverde (1990–1995) – goalie, 1970-04-09 Toronto, ONT
- Kevin Grant (1992–1994) – defense, 1969-01-09 Toronto, ONT
- Steve Graves (1990–1991) – left wing, 1964-04-07 Trenton, ONT
- Keith Gretzky (1989–1990) – centre, 1967-02-16 Brantford, ONT
- Brent Grieve (1995–1997) – left wing, 1969-05-09 Oshawa, ONT
- Brad Guzda (1996–1997) – goalie, 1973-04-28 Banff, ALTA

== H ==
- David Haas (1993–1994) – left wing, 1968-06-23 Toronto, ONT
- Bob Halkidis (1990–1991) – defense, 1966-03-05 Toronto, ONT
- Mark Hardy (1993–1994) – defense, 1959-02-01 Semaden, Switzerland
- Todd Harkins (1996–1997) – centre, 1968-10-08 Cleveland, OH
- Scott Harlow (1990–1991) – left wing, 1963-10-11 East Bridgewater, MA
- Rick Hayward (1990–1991) – defense, 1966-02-25 Toledo, OH
- Jamie Hearn (1996–1997) – defense, 1971-02-23 Quesnel, BC
- Jim Hiller (1992–1993) – right wing, 1969-05-15 Port Alberni, BC
- Justin Hocking (1993–1995) – defense, 1974-01-09 Stettler, ALTA
- Paul Holden (1991–1993) – defense, 1970-03-15 Kitchener, ONT
- Kelly Hrudey (1995–1996) – goalie, 1961-01-13 Edmonton, ALTA
- Mike Hudson (1996–1997) – centre, 1967-02-06 Guelph, ONT
- Dean Hulett (1993–1994) – right wing, 1971-07-25 San Juan, PR

== J ==
- Pauli Jaks (1993–1995) – goalie, 1972-01-25 Schaffhausen, Switzerland
- Steve Jaques (1990–1992) – defense, 1969-02-21 Burnaby, BC
- Bob Jay (1993–1994) – defense, 1965-11-18 Burlington, MA
- Matt Johnson (1995–1996) – left wing, 1975-11-23 Welland, ONT
- Steve Johnson (1989–1990) – forward, 1966-03-03 Grand Forks, ND

== K ==
- Trent Kaese (1989–1990) – right wing, 1967-09-09 Nanaimo, BC
- Tom Karalis (1989–1990) – defense, 1964-05-24 Montreal, PQ
- Kyosti Karjalainen ( 1990–1992) – forward, 1967-06-19 Gavle, Sweden
- Ed Kastelic (1992–1993) – right wing, 1964-01-29 Toronto, ONT
- Paul Kelly (1989–1990) – right wing, 1967-04-17 Hamilton, ONT
- Bob Kennedy (1989–1990)
- Kevin Kerr (1989–1994) – right wing, 1967-09-18 North Bay, ONT
- Rick Knickle (1993–1994) – goalie, 1960-02-26 Dartmouth, NS
- Fred Knipscheer (1996–1997) – centre, 1969-09-03 Ft. Wayne, IN
- Chris Kontos (1990–1991) – left wing, 1963-12-10 Toronto, ONT
- Dave Korol (1989–1990) – defense, 1965-03-01 Winnipeg, MAN
- Igor Korolev (1996–1997) – centre, 1970-09-06 Moscow, Russia
- Ted Kramer (1992–1993) – right wing, 1969-10-29 Findlay, OH

== L ==
- Eric Lacroix (1994–1995) – left wing, 1971-07-15 Montreal, PQ
- Nathan LaFayette (1996–1997) – centre, 1973-02-17 New Westminster, BC
- Jason Lafreniere (1989–1990) – centre, 1966-12-06 St. Catharines, ONT
- Tom Laidlaw (1990–1991) – defense, 1958-04-15 Brampton, ONT
- Jeff Lamb (1989–1990)
- Robert Lang (1992–1994) – centre, 1970-12-19 Teplice, Czech
- Marc Laniel (1989–1990) – defense, 1968-01-16 Oshawa, ONT
- Rick Lanz (1991–1992) – defense, 1961-09-16 Karlovy Vary, Czech
- Steve Larouche (1995–1996) – centre, 1971-04-14 Rouyn-Noranda, PQ
- Eric Lavigne (1993–1995) – defense, 1972-11-14 Victoriaville, PQ
- Dominic Lavoie (1993–1994) – defense, 1967-11-21 Montreal, PQ
- Brian Lawton (1990–1991) – left wing, 1965-06-29 New Brunswick, NJ
- Guy Leveque (1992–1995) – centre, 1972-12-28 Kingston, ONT
- Mikael Lindholm (1990–1991) – left wing, 1964-12-19 Brynas, Sweden
- David Littman (1989–1990) – goalie, 1967-06-13 Cranston, RI
- Lonnie Loach (1992–1993) – left wing, 1968-04-14 New Liskeard, ONT
- Chris Luongo (1989–1990) – defense, 1967-03-17 Detroit, MI

== M ==
- Kevin MacDonald (1989–1993) – defense, 1966-02-24 Prescott, ONT
- Andrew MacVicar (1989–1990) – left wing, 1969-03-12 Dartmouth, NS
- Mike MacWilliam (1996–1997) – left wing, 1967-02-14 Burnaby, BC
- Jeff Madill (1996–1997) – right wing, 1965-06-21 Oshawa, ONT
- Jim Maher (1991–1994) – defense, 1970-06-30 Warren, MI
- Jacques Mailhot (1989–1990) – right wing, 1961-12-05 Shawnigan, PQ
- Kurt Mallett (1996–1997) – right wing, 1971-03-27 Saugus, MA
- George Maneluk (1992–1993) – goalie, 1967-07-25 Winnipeg, MAN
- Chris Marinucci (1996–1997) – centre, 1971-12-29 Grand Rapids, MN
- Don Martin (1989–1990) – defense, 1968-03-29 London, ONT
- Ivan Matulik (1989–1990) – right wing, 1968-06-17 Nitra, Slovakia
- Roger Maxwell (1996–1997) – right wing, 1975-11-21 Brampton, ONT
- Daryn McBride (1990–1991) – right wing, 1968-03-29 Fort Saskatchewan, ALTA
- Brad McCaughey (1992–1993) – centre, 1966-06-10 Ann Arbor, MI
- Shawn McCosh (1991–1993) – centre, 1969-06-05 Oshawa, ONT
- Jim McGeough (1989–1990) – centre, 1963-04-13 Regina, SASK
- Brian McKee (1994–1995) – defense, 1964-12-13 Willowdale, ONT
- Steve McKenna (1996–1997) – defense, 1973-08-21 Toronto, ONT
- Ken McRae (1994–1997) – right wing, 1968-04-23 Winchester, ONT
- Brian McReynolds (1993–1995) – centre, 1965-01-05 Penetanguishene, ONT
- Kris Miller (1991–1992) – defense, 1969-03-30 Bemidji, MN
- Jaroslav Modry (1996–1997) – defense, 1971-02-27 Ceske-Budejovice, Czech Rep.
- Carl Mokosak (1989–1990) – left wing, 1962-09-22 Fort Saskatchewan, ALTA
- John Mokosak (1992–1993) – defense, 1963-09-07 Edmonton, ALTA
- Michel Mongeau (1996–1997) – centre, 1965-02-09 Nun's Island, PQ
- Jason Morgan (1996–1997) – centre, 1976-10-09 St. John's, NFLD
- Dave Moylan (1990–1991) – defense, 1967-08-13 Tillsonburg, ONT
- Rob Murphy (1993–1995) – centre, 1969-04-07 Hull, PQ
- Pat Murray (1993–1994) – left wing, 1969-08-20 Stratford, ONT

== N ==
- Vaclav Nedomansky (1994–1996) – right wing, 1971-01-05 Bratislava, Slovakia
- Jan Nemecek (1996–1997) – defense, 1976-02-14 Pisek, Czech
- Robbie Nichols (1989–1990) – right wing, 1964-08-04 Hamilton, ONT
- Barry Nieckar (1991–1992) – left wing, 1967-12-16 Rama, SASK
- Chris Norton (1991–1992)
- Richard Novak (1989–1990) – right wing, 1966-02-19 Kamloops, BC

== O ==
- Sean O'Brien (1996–1997) – left wing, 1972-02-09 Boston, MA
- Sean O'Donnell (1994–1995) – defense, 1971-10-13 Ottawa, ONT
- Billy O'Dwyer (1990–1992) – forward, 1960-01-25 South Boston, MA
- Mike O'Neill (1994–1995) – goalie, 1967-11-03 Montreal, PQ

== P ==
- Dave Pasin (1990–1991) – centre, 1966-07-08 Edmonton, ALTA
- Joe Paterson (1991–1992) – left wing, 1960-06-25 Toronto, ONT
- Davis Payne (1993–1994) – right wing, 1970-10-24 King City, ONT
- Randy Pearce (1994–1996) – left wing, 1970-02-23 Kitchener, ONT
- Yanic Perreault (1994–1995) – centre, 1971-04-04 Sherbrooke, PQ
- Bryant Perrier (1989–1990) – defense, 1965-05-17 Vancouver, BC
- Barry Potomski (1994–1997) – right wing, 1972-11-24 Windsor, ONT
- Petr Prajsler (1990–1991) – defense, 1965-09-21 Hradec Kralove, Czech

== R ==
- Andre Racicot (1994–1995) – goalie, 1969-06-09 Rouyn-Noranda, PQ
- Eldon "Pokey" Reddick (1989–1990) – goalie, 1964-10-06 Halifax, NS
- Keith Redmond (1992–1996) – left wing, 1972-10-25 Richmond Hill, ONT
- Carl Repp (1989–1990) – goalie, Kimberley, BC
- Eric Ricard (1990–1991) – defense, 1969-02-16 St. Cesaire, PQ
- Stephane Richer (1990–1991) – defense, 1966-04-28 Hull, PQ
- Dave Richter (1989–1990) – defense, 1960-04-08 Winnipeg, MAN
- Trevor Roenick (1996–1997) – right wing, 1974-10-07 Derby, CT
- Jeff Rohlicek (1990–1992) – centre, 1966-01-27 Park Ridge, IL
- Steve Rooney (1990–1991) – forward, 1963-06-28 Canton, MA
- Serge Roy (1990–1991) – defense, 1962-06-25 Sept-Iles, PQ
- Mike Ruark (1991–1993) – defense, 1971-04-18 Calgary, ALTA
- Daniel Rydmark (1995–1996) – centre, 1970-02-23 Vasteras, Sweden

== S ==
- Brent Sapergia (1989–1990) – right wing, 1962-11-16 Flin Flon, MAN
- Marc Saumier (1990–1993) – centre, 1969-04-18 Hull, PQ
- Rob Schena (1989–1990) – defense, 1967-02-05 Saugus, MA
- Chris Schmidt (1996–1997) – centre, 1976-03-01 Beaver Lodge, ALTA
- Doug Searle (1995–1996) – defense, 1972-03-21 Toronto, ONT
- Brett Seguin (1992–1995) – centre, 1972-02-20 St. Mary's, ONT
- Brandy Semchuk (1991–1994) – right wing, 1971-09-22 Calgary, ALTA
- Peter Sentner (1990–1991) – defense, 1969-06-13 Boston, MA
- Daniel Shank (1993–1994) – right wing, 1967-05-12 Montreal, PQ
- Oleg Shargorodsky (1995–1996) – defense, 1969-11-18 Kharkov, Ukraine
- Jeff Shevalier (1994–1997) – left wing, 1974-03-14 Mississauga, ONT
- Gary Shuchuk (1994–1996) – centre, 1967-02-17 Edmonton, ALTA
- Ilkka Sinisalo (1991–1992) – forward, 1958-07-10 Valkeakoski, Finland
- John Slaney (1996–1997) – defense, 1972-02-07 St. John's, NFLD
- Doug Smith (1994–1995) – right wing, 1964-12-27 Hanover, MA
- Vern Smith (1989–1992) – defense, 1964-05-30 Lethbridge, ALTA
- Brad Smyth (1996–1997) – right wing, 1973-03-13 Ottawa, ONT
- Chris Snell (1994–1996) – defense, 1971-07-12 Regina, SASK
- Stephane Soulliere (1995–1997) – centre, 1975-05-30 Greenfield Park, PQ
- Ken Spangler (1989–1990) – defense, 1967-05-02 Edmonton, ALTA
- Graham Stanley (1990–1991) – right wing, 1966-03-19 St. Catharine's, ONT
- Sergei Stas (1995–1996) – defense, 1974-04-28 Minsk, Belarus
- Robb Stauber (1990–1994) – goalie, 1967-11-25 Duluth, MN
- Dave Stewart (1992–1994) – defense, 1972-01-11 Norwood, ONT
- Jamie Storr (1995–1997) – goalie, 1975-12-28 Brampton, ONT
- Brian Straub (1994–1995) – defense, 1968-07-02 Elizabeth, NJ
- Marc Straub (1994–1995)
- Steve Strunk (1993–1994) – centre, 1968-08-01 Wausau, WI
- Ron Sutter (1995–1996) – centre, 1963-12-02 Viking, ALTA

== T ==
- Patrice Tardif (1996–1997) – centre, 1970-10-30 Saint-Methode-de-Fro, PQ
- Dave Thomlinson (1993–1997) – left wing, 1966-10-22 Edmonton, ALTA
- Brent Thompson (1990–1997) – defense, 1971-01-09 Calgary, ALTA
- Jim Thomson (1991–1993) – right wing, 1965-12-30 Edmonton, ALTA
- Brad Tiley (1992–1997) – defense, 1971-07-05 Markdale, ONT
- Grant Tkachuk (1989–1990) – left wing, 1968-09-24 L.L. Biche, ALTA
- Doug Torrel (1996–1997) – right wing, 1969-04-29 Hibbing, MN
- Dave Tretowicz (1991–1993)
- Soren True (1991–1992) – left wing, 1968-02-09 Aarhus, Denmark
- Denis Tsygurov (1995–1996) – defense, 1971-02-26 Chelyabinsk, Russia

== V ==
- Nicholas Vachon (1994–1997) – left wing, 1972-07-20 Montreal, PQ
- John Van Kessel (1990–1992) – right wing, 1969-12-19 Bridgewater, NS
- John Vary (1992–1993) – defense, 1972-02-11 Owen Sound, ONT
- Darren Veitch (1995–1996) – defense, 1960-04-24 Saskatoon, SASK
- Mike Vellucci (1989–1990) – defense, 1966-08-11 Farmington, MI
- Jim Vesey (1993–1995) – centre, 1965-09-29 Charlestown, MA
- Mark Vichorek (1989–1990) – defense, 1963-01-05 Moose Lake, MN
- Mickey Volcan (1990–1991) – defense, 1962-03-03 Edmonton, ALTA
- Jan Vopat (1995–1997) – defense, 1973-03-22 Most, Czech Rep.
- Roman Vopat (1996–1997) – centre, 1976-04-21 Litvinov, Czech
- Mike Vukonich (1991–1994) – centre, 1968-11-05 Duluth, MN
- Igor Vyazmikin (1991–1992) – left wing, 1966-01-08 Moscow, Russia

== W ==
- Tim Watters (1991–1995) – defense, 1959-07-25 Kamloops, BC
- Sean Whitham (1989–1990) – defense, 1967-03-13 Verdun, PQ
- Sean Whyte (1990–1996) – right wing, 1970-05-04 Sudbury, ONT
- Darryl Williams (1990–1994) – left wing, 1968-02-29 Labrador City, NF
- Ross Wilson (1991–1992) – right wing, 1969-06-26 The Pas, MAN
- Steve Wilson (1994–1996) – defense, 1968-09-03 Belleville, ONT

== Y ==
- Vitali Yachmenev (1994–1995) – left wing, 1975-01-08 Chelyabinsk, Russia
- Scott Young (1990–1991) – defense, 1965-05-26 Oakville, ONT

== Z ==
- Rick Zombo (1996–1997) – defense, 1963-05-08 Des Plaines, IL
