= Larry Olimb =

American ice hockey player (born 1969)

- Born: August 11, 1969 (age 57) Warroad, Minnesota, USA
- Height: 5 ft 10 in (178 cm)
- Weight: 180 lb (82 kg; 12 st 12 lb)
- Position: Defenseman/Center
- Shot: Left
- Played for: Minnesota; Kansas City Blades; St. Paul Fighting Saints; Toledo Storm; Warroad Lakers; Minnesota Arctic Blast; Minnesota Moose
- NHL draft: 193rd, 1987; Minnesota North Stars
- Playing career: 1988–1995

Lawrence Olimb is an American retired ice hockey defenseman and center who was an All-American for Minnesota.

== Career ==
Olimb was a star player in high school, helping Warroad High School reach the state tournament twice. Because he turned 18 before the start of his senior season, Olimb was eligible for the 1987 NHL entry draft and became one of the few high school players to have already been drafted after the Minnesota North Stars selected him in the 10th round. He continued to show his talent that season and received the Mr. Hockey Award as the top player in the state. He would later be ranked as the 33rd best player in the history of Minnesota High School Hockey.

With his highly successful junior career, there was little surprise that Olimb ended up going to Minnesota. In his freshman season, Olimb moved to center and helped the Gophers reach the 1989 championship game. He assisted on the game's opening goal but couldn't prevent Harvard from winning the title in overtime. He remained a key contributor for Minnesota for the next three years, helping the Golden Gophers reach the NCAA Tournament every year he was with the program. Olimb was named team captain for his senior season and responded with his best performance. He scored nearly two points per game and became the Gophers' all-time leader in assists, surpassing the legendary John Mayasich.

After graduating, Olimb played professionally for a few seasons, including a stint in Roller Hockey International, retiring from the game in 1995.

== Statistics ==
=== Regular season and playoffs ===
			Regular Season					Playoffs
Season	Team	League	GP	G	A	Pts	PIM	GP	G	A	Pts	PIM
1986–87	Warroad High School	MN–HS	—	—	—	—	—	—	—	—	—	—
1987–88	Warroad High School	MN–HS	—	—	—	—	—	—	—	—	—	—
1988–89	Minnesota	WCHA	47	10	29	39	50	—	—	—	—	—
1989–90	Minnesota	WCHA	46	6	36	42	44	—	—	—	—	—
1990–91	Minnesota	WCHA	45	19	38	57	52	—	—	—	—	—
1991–92	Minnesota	WCHA	44	24	56	80	72	—	—	—	—	—
1992–93	Toledo Storm	ECHL	5	3	2	5	2	—	—	—	—	—
1992–93	Kansas City Blades	IHL	11	0	6	6	4	—	—	—	—	—
1992–93	St. Paul Fighting Saints	AHA	3	2	1	3	0	—	—	—	—	—
1993–94	Warroad Lakers	Sr. Hockey	—	—	—	—	—	—	—	—	—	—
1994	Minnesota Arctic Blast	RHI	22	26	39	65	26	—	—	—	—	—
1994–95	Minnesota Moose	IHL	75	13	14	27	34	1	0	0	0	2
NCAA totals			182	59	159	218	218	—	—	—	—	—
IHL totals			86	13	20	33	38	1	0	0	0	2

== Awards and honors ==
Award	Year
All-WCHA Second Team	1990–91
WCHA All-Tournament Team	1991
All-WCHA First Team	1991–92
AHCA West Second-Team All-American	1991–92

Awards and achievements
Preceded by Kris Miller	Minnesota Mr. Hockey; 1988–89	Succeeded by Trent Klatt
