= Nick Beaulieu =

Canadian ice hockey player

- Born: August 19, 1968 (age 57) Rimouski, Quebec, Canada
- Height: 6 ft 1 in (185 cm)
- Weight: 207 lb (94 kg; 14 st 11 lb)
- Position: Left wing
- Shot: Left
- Played for: Cape Breton Oilers; Phoenix Roadrunners; Albany Choppers; Kalamazoo Wings
- NHL draft: 168th overall, 1986; Edmonton Oilers
- Playing career: 1988–1993

Nick Beaulieu (born August 19, 1968, in Rimouski, Quebec) is a retired Canadian ice hockey left winger.

Beaulieu played 143 games (regular season and playoff) in the International Hockey League (1945–2001) and 60 regular season games in the American Hockey League. In addition, Beaulieu played for the Tulsa Oilers in the inaugural season of the Central Hockey League (1992–2014) and the Green Bay Ice in the only season of the American Hockey Association (1992–93).

Beaulieu was drafted in the 8th round, 168th pick overall, in the 1986 NHL entry draft by the Edmonton Oilers.

Beaulieu was signed by the Los Angeles Kings organization, but never played in the National Hockey League.
