= Minnesota Iron Rangers (AHA) =

- City: Hibbing, Minnesota
- League: American Hockey Association
- Operated: 1992–1993
- Home arena: Hibbing Memorial Building

The Minnesota Iron Rangers are a defunct professional ice hockey team. Based in Hibbing, Minnesota, their only season of play was 1992–93 in the American Hockey Association. The Iron Rangers played their home games at the Hibbing Memorial Building. The team was coached by Mike Antonovich, who also played in two games during the season.

== Notable players ==
- Mike Antonovich
- Doug Keans
