= American Hockey Association =

American Hockey Association may refer to:

- American Hockey Association (1926–1942), a minor pro league existing between 1926 and 1942
- American Hockey Association (1992–93), a minor pro league existing between 1992 and 1993
