= Vyazmikin =

Vyazmikin (Russian: Вязьми́кин) is a Russian surname. Notable people with the surname include:

- Dmitri Vyazmikin (born 1972), Russian footballer and manager
- Igor Vyazmikin (1966–2009), Soviet and Russian ice hockey player and coach
