= Petr Prajsler =

Czech ice hockey player

- Born: 21 September 1965 (age 60) Hradec Králové, Czechoslovakia
- Height: 6 ft 2 in (188 cm)
- Weight: 200 lb (91 kg; 14 st 4 lb)
- Position: Defence
- Shot: Left
- Played for: Tesla Pardubice; Los Angeles Kings; Boston Bruins
- NHL draft: 93rd overall, 1985; Los Angeles Kings
- Playing career: 1984–1994

Petr Prajsler (born 21 September 1965) is a Czech former professional ice hockey defenceman who played in the National Hockey League for the Los Angeles Kings between 1987 and 1990 and the Boston Bruins in 1991. He also played several seasons in the Czech Republic. Internationally Prajsler played for the Czechoslovak national junior team at the 1985 World Junior Championships, winning a silver medal.

Prajsler began his career with Tesla Pardubice in 1984 where he spent three seasons. He was drafted 93rd overall by Los Angeles in the 1985 NHL entry draft and played 43 regular season games for the Kings over three seasons, scoring three goals and ten assists. In 1990, Prajsler moved to the International Hockey League and joined the Phoenix Roadrunners where in 77 games, he scored 13 goals and 47 points, his most productive season.

He was signed by the Boston Bruins as a free-agent the next year, but only managed to play three more NHL games, going pointless. He did though have another highly productive season, this time for the Maine Mariners where he scored 12 goals and 45 points in just 61 games.

He returned to his homeland in 1992, playing for his hometown team Stadion Hradec Králové, who were playing in the Czechoslovak Second Division. The team won promotion to the newly formed Czech Extraliga which was formed after the breakup of Czechoslovakia in 1993, but only managed to play 17 games in a season which saw them relegated. It was his final season as he retired shortly afterwards.

== Career statistics ==
=== Regular season and playoffs ===
			Regular season					Playoffs
Season	Team	League	GP	G	A	Pts	PIM	GP	G	A	Pts	PIM
1983–84	HK Hradec Králové U20	CSSR Jr	24	15	10	25	—	—	—	—	—	—
1983–84	TJ Stadion Hradec Králové	CSSR-2	—	1	—	—	—	—	—	—	—	—
1984–85	TJ Tesla Pardubice	CSSR	29	4	1	5	24	—	—	—	—	—
1985–86	TJ Tesla Pardubice	CSSR	43	8	—	—	—	—	—	—	—	—
1985–86	TJ Stadion Hradec Králové	CSSR-2	—	1	—	—	—	—	—	—	—	—
1986–87	TJ Tesla Pardubice	CSSR	32	2	3	5	49	9	1	1	2	—
1987–88	Los Angeles Kings	NHL	7	0	0	0	2	—	—	—	—	—
1987–88	New Haven Nighthawks	AHL	41	3	8	11	58	—	—	—	—	—
1988–89	Los Angeles Kings	NHL	2	0	3	3	0	1	0	0	0	0
1988–89	New Haven Nighthawks	AHL	43	4	6	10	96	16	3	3	6	34
1989–90	Los Angeles Kings	NHL	34	3	7	10	47	3	0	0	0	0
1989–90	New Haven Nighthawks	AHL	6	1	7	8	2	—	—	—	—	—
1990–91	Phoenix Roadrunners	IHL	77	13	34	47	140	9	1	9	10	18
1991–92	Boston Bruins	NHL	3	0	0	0	2	—	—	—	—	—
1991–92	Maine Mariners	AHL	61	12	33	45	88	—	—	—	—	—
1992–93	HC Stadion Hradec Králové	CSSR-2	—	—	—	—	—	—	—	—	—	—
1993–94	HC Stadion Hradec Králové	CZE	17	0	5	5	26	—	—	—	—	—
2007–08	Stadion Nový Bydžov	CZE-4	12	3	1	4	8	—	—	—	—	—
2008–09	Stadion Nový Bydžov	CZE-4	11	3	1	4	33	—	—	—	—	—
2009–10	HC VCES Hradec Králové	CZE-2	1	0	0	0	0	8	0	1	1	16
2009–10	SC Kolín	CZE-3	1	0	0	0	2	—	—	—	—	—
2009–10	SK Třebechovice pod Orebem	CZE-4	10	3	2	5	8	—	—	—	—	—
2010–11	SK Třebechovice pod Orebem	CZE-4	9	1	2	3	18	—	—	—	—	—
2015–16	Dammarie	FRA-4	1	1	0	1	4	—	—	—	—	—
CSSR totals			121	14	9	23	99	9	1	1	2	—
NHL totals			77	13	34	47	140	9	1	9	10	18

=== International ===
Medal record

Representing Czechoslovakia

Ice hockey

World Junior Championships
Silver medal – second place	1985 Finland	

European Junior Championships
Bronze medal – third place	1983 Norway	

Year	Team	Event	GP	G	A	Pts	PIM
1983	Czechoslovakia	EJC	5	1	0	1	4
1985	Czechoslovakia	WJC	6	1	2	3	4
Junior totals			11	2	2	4	8
