= Mark Vichorek =

American ice hockey player

- Born: June 6, 1963 (age 63) Moose Lake, Minnesota, US
- Height: 6 ft 3 in (191 cm)
- Weight: 205 lb (93 kg; 14 st 9 lb)
- Position: Defense
- Shot: Right
- Played for: AHL; Binghamton Whalers; New Haven Nighthawks; IHL; Salt Lake Golden Eagles; Milwaukee Admirals; Flint Spirits; Phoenix Roadrunners; Fort Wayne Komets; Kansas City Blades; San Diego Gulls; ECHL; Nashville Knights; CoHL; St. Thomas Wildcats; Flint Generals; AHA; Green Bay Ice
- NHL draft: 245th overall, 1982; Philadelphia Flyers
- Playing career: 1986–1995

Mark Vichorek (born January 5, 1963) is an American retired professional ice hockey player. He was selected by the Philadelphia Flyers in the 12th round (245th overall) of the 1982 NHL entry draft.

== Early life ==
Vichorek was born in Moose Lake, Minnesota. He attended Lake Superior State University where he played college hockey with the Lake Superior State Lakers men's ice hockey team from 1982 to 1986. Vichorek set an all-time consecutive game played record at LSSU of 161 games. He was also the freshman of the year in 1982–1983 and runner-up for athlete of the year in his senior year of 1986. Vichorek is also the only LSSU hockey player to be named a captain for three seasons at LSSU.

== Career ==
Vichorek was drafted by the Philadelphia Flyers from the Sioux City Musketeers of the United States Hockey League. The Musketeers lost in the Robertson Cup finals to the Paddock Pool Saints in the 1981–1982 season. Vichorek was only one of three players drafted that year out of the USHL.

In 1986, following his college career, the unsigned defenseman was offered and signed a professional contract by the Hartford Whalers and assigned to play in the AHL with the Binghamton Whalers and later assigned to the Salt Lake Golden Eagles where he was part of the Turner Cup Championship team in 1987–1988. Mark also played in a Calder Cup championship with the New Haven Nighthawks in the 1988–1989 season, where they lost to the Adirondack Redwings in six games, that included players Barry Melrose and Robbie Nichols.

Upon retiring, Vichorek began his coaching career at the minor professional level of the defunct American Hockey Association. After one year with the AHA, he was hired at Michigan Technological University as an assistant coach of the Michigan Tech Huskies. Vichorek returned home to his hometown of Moose Lake to coach his former high school team for six seasons. Vichorek also coached several International Cup teams, winning four championships with boys and girls teams. In one stretch, his women's teams won three International Cups in a row, between 1998 and 2000.

== Career statistics ==
			Regular season					Playoffs
Season	Team	League	GP	G	A	Pts	PIM	GP	G	A	Pts	PIM
1981–82	Sioux City Musketeers	USHL	48	11	27	38	111	—	—	—	—	—
1982–83	Lake Superior State University	NCAA	36	2	13	15	24	—	—	—	—	—
1983–84	Lake Superior State University	NCAA	40	3	8	11	14	—	—	—	—	—
1984–85	Lake Superior State University	NCAA	44	4	11	15	36	—	—	—	—	—
1985–86	Lake Superior State University	NCAA	39	9	11	20	38	—	—	—	—	—
1986–87	Salt Lake Golden Eagles	IHL	16	1	0	1	32	17	0	8	8	23
1986–87	Binghamton Whalers	AHL	64	1	12	13	63	2	0	0	0	0
1987–88	Binghamton Whalers	AHL	26	0	4	4	48	—	—	—	—	—
1987–88	Milwaukee Admirals	IHL	49	4	5	9	67	—	—	—	—	—
1988–89	Flint Spirits	IHL	44	4	9	13	47	—	—	—	—	—
1988–89	New Haven Nighthawks	AHL	23	1	5	6	26	17	2	4	6	18
1989–90	Phoenix Roadrunners	IHL	29	2	8	10	57	—	—	—	—	—
1989–90	Fort Wayne Komets	IHL	31	2	4	6	30	5	0	1	1	19
1990–91	Kansas City Blades	IHL	10	0	1	1	4	—	—	—	—	—
1990–91	San Diego Gulls	IHL	14	1	4	5	20	—	—	—	—	—
1990–91	Nashville Knights	ECHL	36	6	29	35	70	—	—	—	—	—
1991–92	St. Thomas Wildcats	CoHL	60	13	28	41	86	12	1	8	9	18
1992–93	Green Bay Ice	AHA	12	3	8	11	40	—	—	—	—	—
1992–93	St. Thomas Wildcats	CoHL	12	5	10	15	14	14	1	4	5	18
1994–95	Flint Generals	CoHL	7	0	1	1	10	6	0	2	2	4
AHL totals			113	2	21	23	137	19	2	4	6	18
IHL totals			193	14	31	45	257	22	0	9	9	42
