= Fargo–Moorhead Express =

- City: Moorhead, Minnesota
- League: American Hockey Association
- Operated: 1992–1993
- Home arena: Moorhead Sports Center

The Fargo–Moorhead Express are a defunct professional ice hockey team. Based in Moorhead, Minnesota, their only season of play was 1992–93 in the American Hockey Association. The Express played their home games at the Moorhead Sports Center.

The team's roster was composed mostly of former college players, none of whom played above the minor-league level. The lone exception to this was Igor Vyazmikin, who played major professional hockey for many years. The only other person of note associated with the team was its head coach, Scott Sandelin, who was a former NHL player and later led Minnesota Duluth to multiple national championships.
