= Jeff Romfo =

American ice hockey right winger

- Born: February 9, 1974 (age 52) Saint Paul, Minnesota, U.S.
- Height: 5 ft 11 in (180 cm)
- Weight: 197 lb (89 kg; 14 st 1 lb)
- Position: Right wing
- Shot: Left
- Played for: South Carolina Stingrays; Lowell Lock Monsters
- NHL draft: 226th overall, 1992; Minnesota North Stars
- Playing career: 1996–2000

Jeff Romfo (born February 9, 1974) is an American former professional ice hockey and roller hockey right winger.

== Career ==
Romfo was drafted 226th overall by the Minnesota North Stars in the 1992 NHL entry draft from Blaine High School. He then spent four seasons with the Minnesota Duluth Bulldogs before turning professional in 1996, spending four seasons with the South Carolina Stingrays of the East Coast Hockey League. He also played three games in the American Hockey League for the South Carolina Stingrays during the 1998–99 AHL season

Romfo also played two seasons in Roller Hockey International, playing the 1996 season with the Minnesota Arctic Blast and the 1999 season with the Minnesota Blue Ox.

== Career statistics ==
			Regular season					Playoffs
Season	Team	League	GP	G	A	Pts	PIM	GP	G	A	Pts	PIM
1992–93	University of Minnesota Duluth	NCAA	38	4	4	8	8	—	—	—	—	—
1993–94	University of Minnesota Duluth	NCAA	38	7	4	11	16	—	—	—	—	—
1994–95	University of Minnesota Duluth	NCAA	35	6	8	14	32	—	—	—	—	—
1995–96	University of Minnesota Duluth	NCAA	37	19	15	34	53	—	—	—	—	—
1996–97	South Carolina Stingrays	ECHL	51	15	33	48	36	15	4	4	8	10
1997–98	South Carolina Stingrays	ECHL	70	14	26	40	82	5	1	1	2	8
1998–99	South Carolina Stingrays	ECHL	69	25	44	69	124	3	1	0	1	0
1999–00	Lowell Lock Monsters	AHL	3	0	0	0	2	—	—	—	—	—
1999–00	South Carolina Stingrays	ECHL	59	10	14	24	71	10	0	0	0	6
ECHL totals			249	64	117	181	313	33	6	5	11	24
