= Igor Vyazmikin =

- Born: January 8, 1966 Moscow, Soviet Union
- Died: October 30, 2009 (aged 43) Moscow, Russia
- Height: 6 ft 1 in (185 cm)
- Weight: 190 lb (86 kg; 13 st 8 lb)
- Position: Left wing
- Shot: Left
- Played for: HC CSKA Moscow; Khimik Voskresensk; Cape Breton Oilers; Edmonton Oilers; Milwaukee Admirals; Phoenix Roadrunners; Fargo-Moorhead Express; HC Fassa (Italy); Hermes HT; Ilves; HC Severstal
- National team: Soviet Union
- NHL draft: 252nd overall, 1987; Edmonton Oilers
- Playing career: 1983–1999

Igor Viktorovich Vyazmikin (Russian: Игорь Викторович Вязьмикин; January 8, 1966 – October 30, 2009) was a Russian professional ice hockey forward, who played for CSKA. He was the final player selected in the 1987 NHL entry draft, going in the twelfth round, 252nd overall, to the Edmonton Oilers, and went on to play four NHL games with that team. Additionally, Vyazmikin played extensively in European and North American minor leagues.

Vyazmikin was born in Moscow, Soviet Union, and represented the Soviet Union twice internationally, at the 1984 and 1986 World Junior Championships. He died on October 30, 2009, from a long illness. He was 43 years old.

== Career statistics ==
=== Regular season and playoffs ===
			Regular season					Playoffs
Season	Team	League	GP	G	A	Pts	PIM	GP	G	A	Pts	PIM
1983–84	CSKA Moscow	Soviet	38	8	12	20	4	—	—	—	—	—
1984–85	CSKA Moscow	Soviet	26	6	5	11	6	—	—	—	—	—
1985–86	CSKA Moscow	Soviet	19	7	6	13	6	—	—	—	—	—
1986–87	CSKA Moscow	Soviet	4	0	0	0	0	—	—	—	—	—
1987–88	CSKA Moscow	Soviet	8	1	0	1	16	—	—	—	—	—
1988–89	CSKA Moscow	Soviet	30	10	7	17	20	—	—	—	—	—
1989–90	Khimik Voskresensk	Soviet	34	11	13	24	26	—	—	—	—	—
1990–91	Khimik Voskresensk	Soviet	23	7	12	19	17	—	—	—	—	—
1990–91	Edmonton Oilers	NHL	4	1	0	1	0	—	—	—	—	—
1990–91	Cape Breton Oilers	AHL	33	12	19	31	21	4	3	2	5	10
1991–92	Milwaukee Admirals	IHL	8	3	5	8	2	—	—	—	—	—
1991–92	Phoenix Roadrunners	IHL	6	0	3	3	8	—	—	—	—	—
1992–93	Fargo-Moorhead Express	AmHA	24	17	39	56	57	—	—	—	—	—
1993–94	Rungsted Ishockey Klub	DNK	28	28	31	59	60	—	—	—	—	—
1994–95	HC Fassa	ITA	12	8	17	25	6	—	—	—	—	—
1994–95	HC Selva	ITA.2	—	—	—	—	—	12	10	20	30	24
1995–96	Hermes	FIN.2	29	18	20	38	129	10	7	14	21	22
1996–97	Ilves	SM-l	36	8	13	21	76	3	0	0	0	2
1997–98	CSKA Moscow	RSL	25	6	7	13	16	—	—	—	—	—
1998–99	Severstal Cherepovets	RSL	18	3	4	7	31	3	1	0	1	10
Soviet totals			182	50	55	105	95	—	—	—	—	—
NHL totals			4	1	0	1	0	—	—	—	—	—

=== International ===
Year	Team	Event	GP	G	A	Pts	PIM
1983	Soviet Union	EJC	5	9	3	12	8
1984	Soviet Union	WJC	7	6	3	9	6
1984	Soviet Union	EJC	5	11	4	15	8
1986	Soviet Union	WJC	7	5	5	10	6
Junior totals			24	31	15	46	28

== Awards ==
- EJC-A All-Star Team (1983, 1984)
- Named Best Forward at EJC-A (1983)
- WJC-A All-Star Team (1986)
