= Bismarck Bulls =

- City: Bismarck, North Dakota
- League: American Hockey Association
- Operated: 1992–1993
- Home arena: Schaumberg Ice Arena

The Bismarck Bulls are a defunct professional ice hockey team. Based in Bismarck, North Dakota, their only season of play was 1992–93 in the American Hockey Association. The Bulls played their home games at the Schaumberg Ice Arena. The team was coached by Bill LaForge, who had previously coached the Vancouver Canucks.
