= Marsh Ryman =

American ice hockey player and coach, college athletics administrator

Marshall W. "Marsh" Ryman (June 26, 1910 – January 31, 1992) was a collegiate hockey coach and athletic director at the University of Minnesota. Ryman played baseball and hockey for Minnesota and was the hockey team captain for the 1931–32 season. Ryman coached the Minnesota Golden Gophers men's hockey team in the 1955–56 season to a 16–12–1 record while John Mariucci coached the United States national men's ice hockey team at the 1956 Winter Olympics. Subsequently, Ryman served as the national team coach himself, from 1958–59. in 1960, Ryman was a referee at the 1960 Winter Olympics. Later, Ryman became the Gophers' athletic director from 1963 to 1972, when the University forced Ryman to resign. He won the 1972 George Eldridge Distinguished Service Award for his work in that position. In 1978, he was elected to the National Association of College Athletic Directors Hall of Fame. Ryman died of pneumonia in St. Louis Park, Minnesota in 1992. He is interred in Lakewood Cemetery in Minneapolis.

== Head coaching record ==
Statistics overview
Season	Team	Overall	Conference	Standing	Postseason
Minnesota Golden Gophers (WIHL) (1955–1956)
1955–56	Minnesota	16–12–1	11–10–1	4th	
Minnesota:		16–12–1	11–10–1		
Total:		16–12–1			
National champion Postseason invitational champion Conference regular season champion Conference regular season and conference tournament champion Division regular season champion Division regular season and conference tournament champion Conference tournament champion
