= Trent Klatt =

American ice hockey player (born 1971)

- Born: January 30, 1971 (age 55) Robbinsdale, Minnesota, U.S.
- Height: 6 ft 1 in (185 cm)
- Weight: 205 lb (93 kg; 14 st 9 lb)
- Position: Right wing
- Shot: Right
- Played for: Minnesota North Stars; Dallas Stars; Philadelphia Flyers; Vancouver Canucks; Los Angeles Kings
- National team: United States
- NHL draft: 82nd overall, 1989; Washington Capitals
- Playing career: 1992–2004

Trent Thomas Klatt (born January 30, 1971) is an American former professional ice hockey right winger who played 14 seasons in the National Hockey League (NHL) for the Minnesota North Stars, Dallas Stars, Philadelphia Flyers, Vancouver Canucks and Los Angeles Kings.

== Playing career ==
Klatt played his college hockey at the University of Minnesota. He was drafted in the fourth round of the 1989 NHL entry draft by the Washington Capitals. He was traded on June 21, 1991, with Steve Maltais to the North Stars for Shawn Chambers. Klatt played four and a half years with the Stars and was traded to the Flyers in December 1995. It was in Philadelphia that Klatt enjoyed his finest offensive season in 1996–97 scoring 24 goals with 21 assists. On October 19, 1998, Klatt was traded to the Canucks for a draft pick. Klatt ended up playing five seasons with Vancouver, where he was perhaps best known for playing on a line with Daniel and Henrik Sedin in the twins' first three NHL seasons. During the 2003 offseason, Klatt signed a free agent contract with the Kings.

During the NHL lockout of 2004–05, Klatt served on the NHLPA bargaining committee. However, less than a month before the NHL was to restart for the 2005–06 season, Klatt announced his retirement from the NHL, citing family issues as the reason. Klatt coached Bantam A hockey in Grand Rapids, Minnesota along with fellow former NHL player Scot Kleinendorst.. Klatt is Director of Amateur Scouting for the New York Islanders, where he has assumed responsibility for running the Islanders' draft table following the dismissal of former Islanders Asst. GM Ryan Jankowski.

== Coaching career ==
Klatt started as the Junior Varsity and Varsity coach for Grand Rapids High School in the 2015-2016 season, where they finished 3rd in State. He won his 1st Class AA Minnesota State High School Championship on Saturday, March 11, 2017, with a 6-3 win over the Moorhead Spuds.

== Career statistics ==
=== Regular season and playoffs ===
			Regular season					Playoffs
Season	Team	League	GP	G	A	Pts	PIM	GP	G	A	Pts	PIM
1986–87	Osseo Senior High School	HS-MN	22	9	27	36	—	—	—	—	—	—
1987–88	Osseo Senior High School	HS-MN	22	19	17	36	—	—	—	—	—	—
1988–89	Osseo Senior High School	HS-MN	22	24	39	63	—	—	—	—	—	—
1989–90	University of Minnesota	WCHA	38	22	14	36	16	—	—	—	—	—
1990–91	University of Minnesota	WCHA	39	16	28	44	58	—	—	—	—	—
1991–92	University of Minnesota	WCHA	44	30	36	66	78	—	—	—	—	—
1991–92	Minnesota North Stars	NHL	1	0	0	0	0	6	0	0	0	2
1992–93	Kalamazoo Wings	IHL	31	8	11	19	18	—	—	—	—	—
1992–93	Minnesota North Stars	NHL	47	4	19	23	38	—	—	—	—	—
1993–94	Kalamazoo Wings	IHL	6	3	2	5	4	—	—	—	—	—
1993–94	Dallas Stars	NHL	61	14	24	38	30	9	2	1	3	4
1995–96	Michigan K-Wings	IHL	2	1	2	3	5	—	—	—	—	—
1995–96	Dallas Stars	NHL	22	4	4	8	23	—	—	—	—	—
1995–96	Philadelphia Flyers	NHL	49	3	8	11	21	12	4	1	5	0
1996–97	Philadelphia Flyers	NHL	76	24	21	45	20	19	4	3	7	12
1997–98	Philadelphia Flyers	NHL	82	14	28	42	16	5	0	0	0	0
1998–99	Philadelphia Flyers	NHL	2	0	0	0	0	—	—	—	—	—
1998–99	Vancouver Canucks	NHL	73	4	10	14	12	—	—	—	—	—
1999–00	Syracuse Crunch	AHL	24	13	10	23	6	—	—	—	—	—
1999–00	Vancouver Canucks	NHL	47	10	10	20	26	—	—	—	—	—
2000–01	Vancouver Canucks	NHL	77	13	20	33	31	4	3	0	3	0
2001–02	Vancouver Canucks	NHL	34	8	7	15	10	—	—	—	—	—
2002–03	Vancouver Canucks	NHL	82	16	13	29	8	14	2	4	6	2
2003–04	Los Angeles Kings	NHL	82	17	26	43	46	—	—	—	—	—
NHL totals			782	143	200	343	307	74	16	9	25	20

=== International ===
Year	Team	Event	GP	G	A	Pts	PIM
1991	United States	WJC	7	6	6	12	6
1999	United States	WC	6	3	0	3	0

Preceded by Larry Olimb	Minnesota Mr. Hockey; 1988–89 season	Succeeded by Joe Dziedzic
