= Scott Sandelin =

American ice hockey player and coach

- Born: August 8, 1964 (age 62) Hibbing, Minnesota, U.S.
- Height: 6 ft 0 in (183 cm)
- Weight: 200 lb (91 kg; 14 st 4 lb)
- Position: Defense
- Shot: Right
- Played for: Montreal Canadiens; Philadelphia Flyers; Minnesota North Stars
- National team: United States
- NHL draft: 40th overall, 1982; Montreal Canadiens
- Playing career: 1986–1992
- Coaching career

Current position
- Title: Head coach
- Team: Minnesota Duluth
- Conference: NCHC

Biographical details
- Education: University of North Dakota

Playing career
- 1982–1986: North Dakota
- Position: Defenceman

Coaching career (HC unless noted)
- 1992–1993: Fargo–Moorhead Express
- 1993–1994: Fargo–Moorhead jr. Kings
- 1994–2000: North Dakota (assistant)
- 2000–present: Minnesota Duluth
- 2005: US World Junior Team
- 2012: US World Junior Team (assistant)
- 2020: US World Junior Team

Head coaching record
- Overall: 469–408–104 (.531) [college]
- Tournaments: 23–8 (.742)

Accomplishments and honors

Championships
- As an assistant coach 2× NCAA national champion (1997, 2000) As a head coach 3× NCAA national champion (2011, 2018, 2019); 6× NCAA Frozen Four Appearances (2004, 2011, 2017-2019, 2021); NCHC tournament champion (2017, 2019, 2022) WCHA tournament champion (2009)

Awards
- Spencer Penrose Award (2004); WCHA Coach of the Year (2004)

Scott Alan Sandelin (born August 8, 1964) is an American former professional ice hockey player. He is currently the head coach of the Minnesota-Duluth Bulldogs men's ice hockey team. In 2011, he became the first coach in Bulldog history to lead them to a national title, in a 3–2 overtime game against the University of Michigan at the Xcel Energy Center in Saint Paul, Minnesota. In the 2018 NCAAs, he led the Bulldogs to a second national title, over Notre Dame 2–1, also played at the Xcel Energy Center. The following season, in the 2019 NCAAs, he led the Bulldogs to a third national title. Sandelin grew up in Hibbing, Minnesota, where he went on to be drafted in the second round by the Montreal Canadiens (40th overall) and play collegiate hockey for the North Dakota Fighting Sioux.

== Collegiate career ==
During his senior year at North Dakota, Sandelin was chosen as a finalist for the Hobey Baker Award, ALL-WCHA First Team, All American Second Team, and the MVP of the Fighting Sioux.

== Professional career ==
Sandelin's NHL career totaled seven seasons with the Canadiens (1986–88), Philadelphia Flyers (1990–91), and his home state team, the Minnesota North Stars (1991–92). His career was cut short with continuous injuries, but he managed four assists in 25 games. His playing years also included stints with the US World Junior Championship team in 1984 and World Championships in 1986.

== Coaching ==
Sandelin started his coaching career with the Fargo-Moorhead Junior Kings of the Junior Elite Hockey League, which he was with from 1993 to 1994. From there he went to work on the North Dakota staff from 1994 to 2000. The first three as a recruiter and assisting with games and practices. The last three were spent as an associate head coach to Dean Blais. In his years with Fighting Sioux, they went on to make four NCAA from (1996 to 2000), win two National Champions in (1996–97 and 1999–2000), three WCHA regular season champions from (1996–99) and two WCHA conference tournament champions in (1996–97 and 1999–2000).

=== Minnesota-Duluth ===
On March 30, 2000, Sandelin accepted the job as the head coach of the University of Minneasota-Duluth Bulldogs for long time Bulldog coach Mike Sertich. As head coach he has led the Bulldogs to six 22+ win seasons, eight NCAA tournament appearances (2003–04, 2008–09, 2010–2012, 2015–2019). In 2008–09, he knocked off his former North Dakota team to become the WCHA Final Five Champions. Then in 2010–2011 the Bulldogs made a run in the NCAA tournament to become the 2011 NCAA Champions, beating Yale, Union, Notre Dame and Michigan for the title. He made the Bulldogs the second Division I collegiate team in Minnesota to take home the Frozen Four Title, after the Minnesota Golden Gophers. In 2003–04, he was named the WCHA Coach of the year and the National Coach of the year posting a 28–13–4 record and leading the Bulldogs to a third-place finish in the Frozen Four. He has also produced four Hobey Baker winners in Junior Lessard in 2004, Jack Connolly in 2012, Scott Perunovich in 2020, and Max Plante in 2026, along with 15 future NHL hockey players and 17 All WCHA selections. During the stretch he was the US National Junior coach in 2005 and assistant coach in 2012. In the 2011–12 season he led the Bulldogs to a 17-game unbeaten streak, and the first time in Bulldog history at the number one in the USCHO polls for 9 straight weeks. In 2016, he signed a 4-year extension, keeping him under contract until the 2020–2021 season.

He led the 2017 Bulldogs to an NCHC conference tournament championship, the season ended in 3–2 loss to conference foe Denver as NCAA Runner up. In 2018 he led the Bulldogs to a 2nd National Title beating Notre Dame 2–1. The Bulldogs made the 2018 NCAA Hockey Tournament by 0.0001% besting in state rival Minnesota for the last at-large tournament bid. Scott's 2nd National championship as head coach in 2018 was unexpected by many in the hockey community after losing to Denver in the 2017 title game, losing many key players to graduation and early departures to the NHL. Until 2024, each time the NCAA Frozen Four had been held at the Xcel Energy Center in Saint Paul, a Minnesota team has won in overtime, University of Minnesota in (2001–02) beating the University of Maine 4–3 and the Bulldogs in (2010–11) against the University of Michigan 3–2, and again in 2017–2018 beating Notre Dame 2–1.

Sandelin led the 2018-19 Bulldogs to an NCHC conference championship, besting St. Cloud 3–2 in a 2 OT game. The Bulldog's earned a trip to the Frozen Four by beating Bowling Green (2-1 OT) and Quinnipiac (3–1). The semifinal match-up with Providence ended in a 4–1 win. The Bulldog's finished the season by beating UMass (3–0) earning Sandelin's third coaching championship.

Sandelin led the 2019-20 Bulldogs to 2nd place in the NCHC regular season, but due to the COVID-19 pandemic the conference and NCAA tournaments were cancelled. His team goes into the next season still the reigning NCAA hockey champions.

== Career statistics ==
=== Regular season and playoffs ===
			Regular season					Playoffs
Season	Team	League	GP	G	A	Pts	PIM	GP	G	A	Pts	PIM
1981–82	Hibbing High School	HS-MN	20	5	15	20	30	—	—	—	—	—
1982–83	University of North Dakota	WCHA	30	1	6	7	10	—	—	—	—	—
1983–84	University of North Dakota	WCHA	41	4	23	27	24	—	—	—	—	—
1984–85	University of North Dakota	WCHA	38	4	17	21	30	—	—	—	—	—
1985–86	University of North Dakota	WCHA	40	7	31	38	38	—	—	—	—	—
1985–86	Sherbrooke Canadiens	AHL	6	0	2	2	2	—	—	—	—	—
1986–87	Sherbrooke Canadiens	AHL	74	7	22	29	35	16	2	4	6	2
1986–87	Montreal Canadiens	NHL	1	0	0	0	0	—	—	—	—	—
1987–88	Montreal Canadiens	NHL	8	0	1	1	2	—	—	—	—	—
1987–88	Sherbrooke Canadiens	AHL	58	8	14	22	35	4	0	2	2	0
1988–89	Sherbrooke Canadiens	AHL	12	0	9	9	8	—	—	—	—	—
1988–89	Hershey Bears	AHL	39	6	9	15	38	8	2	1	3	4
1989–90	Hershey Bears	AHL	70	4	27	31	38	—	—	—	—	—
1990–91	Hershey Bears	AHL	39	3	10	13	21	7	1	2	3	0
1990–91	Philadelphia Flyers	NHL	15	0	3	3	0	—	—	—	—	—
1991–92	Kalamazoo Wings	IHL	49	3	18	21	32	11	1	1	2	2
1991–92	Minnesota North Stars	NHL	1	0	0	0	0	—	—	—	—	—
NHL totals			25	0	4	4	2	—	—	—	—	—

=== International ===
Year	Team	Event	GP	G	A	Pts	PIM
1984	United States	WJC	7	0	1	1	10
1986	United States	WC	10	2	0	2	2
Junior totals			7	0	1	1	10
Senior totals			10	2	0	2	2

== Head coaching record ==
Record table
Season	Team	Overall	Conference	Standing	Postseason
Minnesota–Duluth Bulldogs (WCHA) (2000–2013)
2000–01	Minnesota–Duluth	7–28–4	3–22–3	10th	WCHA first round
2001–02	Minnesota–Duluth	13–24–3	6–19–3	9th	WCHA first round
2002–03	Minnesota–Duluth	22–15–5	14–10–4	5th	WCHA third-place game (win)
2003–04	Minnesota–Duluth	28–13–4	19–7–2	2nd	NCAA Frozen Four
2004–05	Minnesota–Duluth	15–17–6	11–13–4	6th	WCHA first round
2005–06	Minnesota–Duluth	11–25–4	6–19–3	9th	WCHA Quarterfinal
2006–07	Minnesota–Duluth	13–21–5	8–16–4	9th	WCHA first round
2007–08	Minnesota–Duluth	13–17–6	9–14–5	9th	WCHA first round
2008–09	Minnesota–Duluth	22–13–8	10–11–7	7th	NCAA West Regional Final
2009–10	Minnesota–Duluth	22–17–1	16–11–1	t-4th	WCHA Quarterfinal
2010–11	Minnesota–Duluth	26–10–6	15–8–5	4th	NCAA national champion
2011–12	Minnesota–Duluth	25–10–6	16–7–5	2nd	NCAA Northeast Regional Final
2012–13	Minnesota–Duluth	14–19–5	10–13–5	9th	WCHA first round
Minnesota–Duluth:		231–229–63	143–170–51		
Minnesota Duluth Bulldogs (NCHC) (2013–present)
2013–14	Minnesota–Duluth	16–16–4	11–11–2–2	t-4th	NCHC Quarterfinals
2014–15	Minnesota–Duluth	21–16–3	12–9–3–0	5th	NCAA Northeast Regional Final
2015–16	Minnesota–Duluth	19–16–5	11–10–3–1	4th	NCAA Northeast Regional Final
2016–17	Minnesota–Duluth	28–7–7	15–5–4–3	2nd	NCAA runner-up
2017–18	Minnesota–Duluth	25–16–3	13–11–0–0	3rd	NCAA national champion
2018–19	Minnesota–Duluth	29–11–2	14–9–1–0	2nd	NCAA national champion
2019–20	Minnesota Duluth	22–10–2	17–5–2–0	2nd	Tournament Cancelled
2020–21	Minnesota Duluth	15–11–2	13–9–2	3rd	NCAA Frozen Four
2021–22	Minnesota Duluth	22–16–4	10–10–4	T–4th	NCAA West Regional Final
2022–23	Minnesota Duluth	16–20–1	10–14–0	T–5th	NCHC Quarterfinals
2023–24	Minnesota Duluth	12–20–5	8–14–2	7th	NCHC Quarterfinals
2024–25	Minnesota Duluth	13–20–3	9–13–2	7th	NCHC Quarterfinals
Minnesota Duluth:		238–179–41	144–120–25		
Total:		469–408–104			
National champion Postseason invitational champion Conference regular season champion Conference regular season and conference tournament champion Division regular season champion Division regular season and conference tournament champion Conference tournament champion

== Awards and honors ==
Award	Year
All-WCHA First Team	1985–86
AHCA West Second-Team All-American	1985–86

== See also ==
- List of college men's ice hockey coaches with 400 wins

Awards and achievements
Preceded by Bob Daniels	Spencer Penrose Award; 2003–04	Succeeded by George Gwozdecky
Preceded by Troy Jutting	WCHA Coach of the Year; 2003–04	Succeeded by George Gwozdecky
