= Green Bay Ice =

- City: Green Bay, Wisconsin
- League: American Hockey Association
- Operated: 1992–1993
- Home arena: Brown County Veterans Memorial Arena

The Green Bay Ice are a defunct professional ice hockey team. Based in Green Bay, Wisconsin, their only season of play was 1992–93 in the American Hockey Association. The Ice played their home games at the Brown County Veterans Memorial Arena.

== Notable players ==
- Paul Constantin
- Mark Vichorek
- Mikhael Zakharov
