= Ashley Birdsall =

American ice hockey player (born 1990)

- Born: April 19, 1990 (age 35) Duluth, Minnesota, United States
- Height: 160 cm (5 ft 3 in)
- Position: Defender
- Shoots: Right
- NWHL team: Buffalo Beauts
- Played for: Minnesota Whitecaps; University of Wisconsin-Superior
- Playing career: 2019–present

Ashley Birdsall is an American ice hockey defender, currently playing for the Buffalo Beauts in the NWHL.

== Career ==
Birdsall had originally committed to the University of Minnesota-Duluth, before the team scaled back their offers to new players. Instead she chose to go to the University of Wisconsin-Superior, where she would play for a year and a half before leaving to join the military. She would return in 2013, and finished her university career with 15 points in 74 games.

After university, she would play for the independent Minnesota Whitecaps for three years. In August 2019, she signed a professional contracts with the Beauts.

== Personal life ==
Birdsall is a captain in the Minnesota Army National Guard.
