= Hibbing Memorial Building =

Coordinates: 47.4233°N 92.9371°W

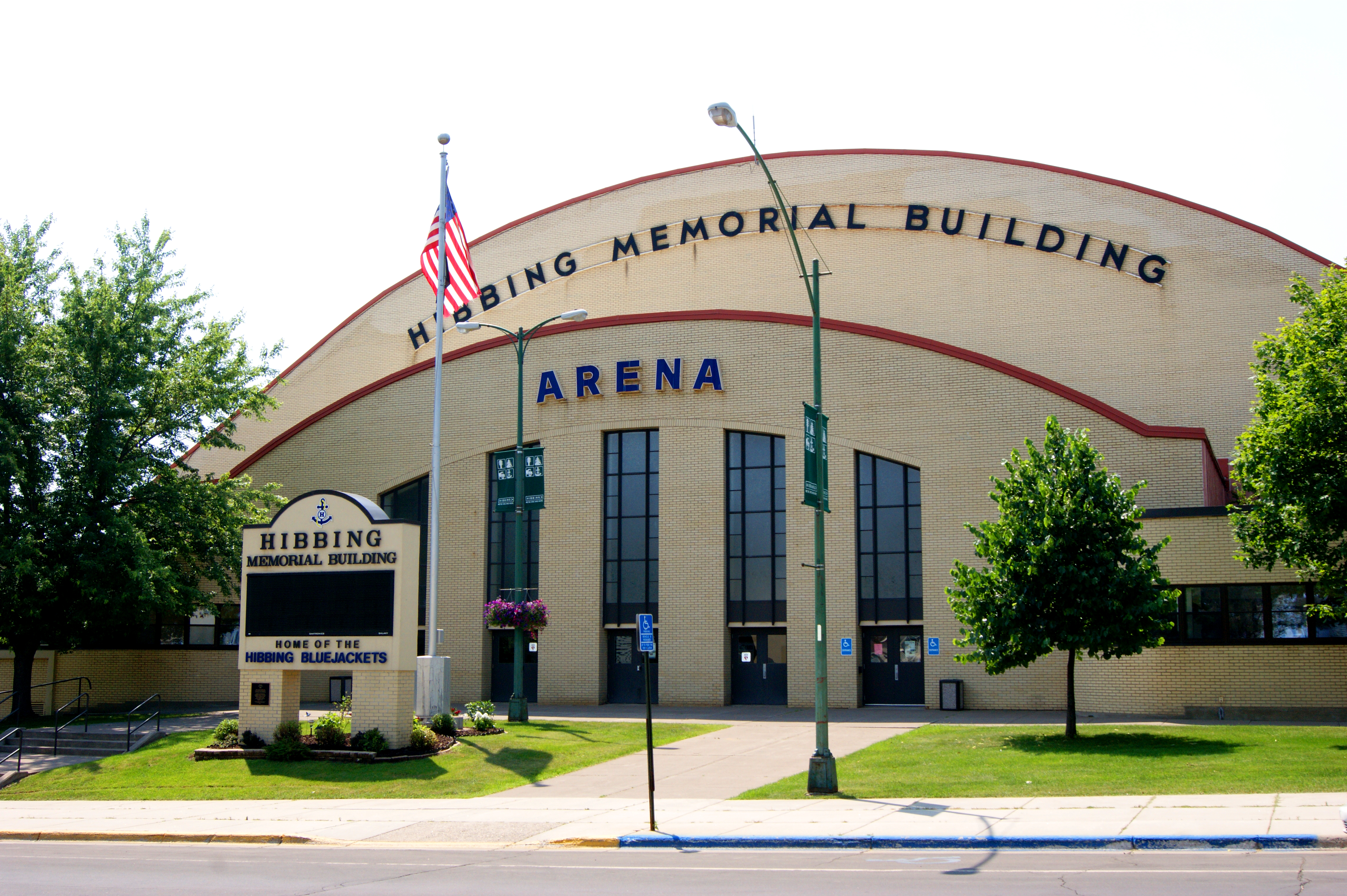
- Interactive map of the Hibbing Memorial Building area

General information
- Location: Hibbing, Minnesota
- Governing body: City of Hibbing

Design and construction
- Architects: E. R. Erickson (rebuilding), Clark Henry (engineer)

The Hibbing Memorial Building is a civic and recreational facility in Hibbing, Minnesota. It was originally constructed in 1925 as a memorial to veterans of World War I, then rebuilt in 1935 after a fire destroyed the original structure. The building has served as a hub for athletic events, political gatherings, community programming, and historical preservation on Minnesota’s Iron Range.

== History ==
The original Hibbing Memorial Building was completed and dedicated on September 18, 1925, in a ceremony attended by an estimated 5,000 people. The structure included a skating rink, curling rinks, a bowling alley, an auditorium, and veterans’ meeting rooms, and was financed at a cost of approximately $400,000.

On December 28, 1933, a fire broke out due to faulty electrical wiring. Firefighters battled the blaze for more than 12 hours in subzero temperatures, and the building was declared a total loss. Insurance paid out $312,995, and salvage from steel components was estimated at $100,000.

Public support and federal funds allowed for reconstruction. A $123,400 grant was awarded in 1934 by the Public Works Administration (PWA). The new structure was designed by Hibbing architect E. R. Erickson with engineer Clark Henry. The updated building emphasized fire-resistant materials and reinforced concrete construction.

The new building opened on December 2, 1935. A formal rededication ceremony was held on November 20, 1935.

During World War II, the building was repurposed for use by the U.S. Army Air Corps, providing barracks and classrooms for trainees stationed in Hibbing.

== Design and facilities ==
The building was constructed using steel-reinforced concrete and features terrazzo flooring. Its roof is dome-shaped and was installed during a particularly cold winter, with temperatures reportedly below –30 °F.

The arena contains a 200×90 ft ice sheet, with artificial refrigeration — the first of its kind on the Iron Range. The facility includes 3,460 permanent seats, with additional space for standing or floor seating raising capacity to approximately 5,460.

Additional features include:

- Seven-sheet curling facility operated by the Hibbing Curling Club
- The Little Theater, seating approximately 260
- Multiple banquet and meeting rooms, formerly used as bowling alleys and veterans' quarters

== Events and usage ==
The arena has hosted MSHSL hockey and basketball games, figure skating competitions, trade shows, rodeos, and concerts. It is also used for graduations and public gatherings.

In professional sports history, the NHL’s Chicago Blackhawks used the building for six training camps in the 1930s and 1940s. The WHA’s Chicago Cougars also held training there in the 1970s. The Hibbing Maroons, a Central Hockey League team, played there until the 1933 fire.

Notable political events include speeches by President Harry S. Truman in 1952, Senator John F. Kennedy in 1960 to a crowd of over 10,000, and campaign events by John Edwards (2004) and Hillary Clinton (2008).

== Current use ==
Today, the Memorial Building remains a multipurpose space managed by the City of Hibbing. It houses the Hibbing Curling Club, local parks and recreation offices, and serves as a venue for a variety of civic, cultural, and sporting events.

== See also ==
- East Howard Street Commercial Historic District
- Hull–Rust–Mahoning Open Pit Iron Mine
