= Troy Jutting =

American ice hockey player and coach

Biographical details
- Born: Richfield, Minnesota, U.S.
- Education: Minnesota State University, Mankato

Playing career
- 1982–1986: Minnesota State
- Position: Center

Coaching career (HC unless noted)
- 1987–1989: Minnesota State (graduate assistant)
- 1989–2000: Minnesota State (assistant)
- 2000–2012: Minnesota State
- 2012–2016: Omaha (assistant)

Head coaching record
- Overall: 184–224–55 (.457)
- Tournaments: 0–1 (.000)

Accomplishments and honors

Awards
- 2003 WCHA Coach of the Year; 2008 WCHA Coach of the Year

Troy Jutting is an American former ice hockey player and coach who was the head coach for Minnesota State for twelve seasons.

== Career ==
Jutting arrived at Mankato State in 1982 and played for years for the program. The Mavericks were one of the better Division III teams during that time, making the NCAA tournament in three seasons and reached the frozen four in his senior year. Jutting graduated a year after his eligibility ended and began attending graduate school at his alma mater, serving concurrently as a graduate assistant for the program for two years. In 1989 Jutting became a full-time assistant for the Mavericks and remained in that position while the team moved up to Division II and finally Division I in 1996. When long-time head coach Don Brose retired after the 1999–00 season Jutting was named as his successor.

In the early years the team played well under Jutting. His teams posted two winning campaigns in the first three seasons and made the 2003 NCAA tournament but after that the results turned bad. In twelve seasons behind the bench Jutting recorded only three winning records and was among the worst programs in the WCHA for his last four years. Minnesota State reassigned him to an administrative position with a year left on his contract in the summer of 2012 but a few months later he was hired by Omaha as an assistant coach. Jutting worked for the Omaha Mavericks for four years before being fired along with the other Omaha assistant coach Alex Todd in the spring of 2016.

== Head coaching record ==
Record table
Season	Team	Overall	Conference	Standing	Postseason
Minnesota State Mavericks (WCHA) (2000–2012)
2000–01	Minnesota State	19–18–1	13–14–1	7th	WCHA first round
2001–02	Minnesota State	16–20–2	11–15–2	t-6th	WCHA first round
2002–03	Minnesota State	20–11–10	15–6–7	t-2nd	NCAA East Regional semifinals
2003–04	Minnesota State	10–24–5	6–18–4	9th	WCHA first round
2004–05	Minnesota State	13–19–6	8–13–4	8th	WCHA first round
2005–06	Minnesota State	17–18–4	12–13–3	7th	WCHA first round
2006–07	Minnesota State	13–19–6	10–13–5	8th	WCHA first round
2007–08	Minnesota State	19–16–4	12–12–4	t-4th	WCHA first round
2008–09	Minnesota State	15–17–6	11–13–4	8th	WCHA first round
2009–10	Minnesota State	16–20–3	9–17–2	t-8th	WCHA first round
2010–11	Minnesota State	14–18–6	8–16–4	11th	WCHA first round
2011–12	Minnesota State	12–24–2	8–18–2	11th	WCHA first round
Minnesota State:		184–224–55	123–168–42		
Total:		184–224–55			
National champion Postseason invitational champion Conference regular season champion Conference regular season and conference tournament champion Division regular season champion Division regular season and conference tournament champion Conference tournament champion

Awards and achievements
Preceded by George Gwozdecky; Jamie Russell/Bob Motzko	WCHA Coach of the Year; 2002–03; 2007–08	Succeeded by Scott Sandelin; Dave Hakstol
