= Pat Finnegan =

American ice hockey player (1927–1989)

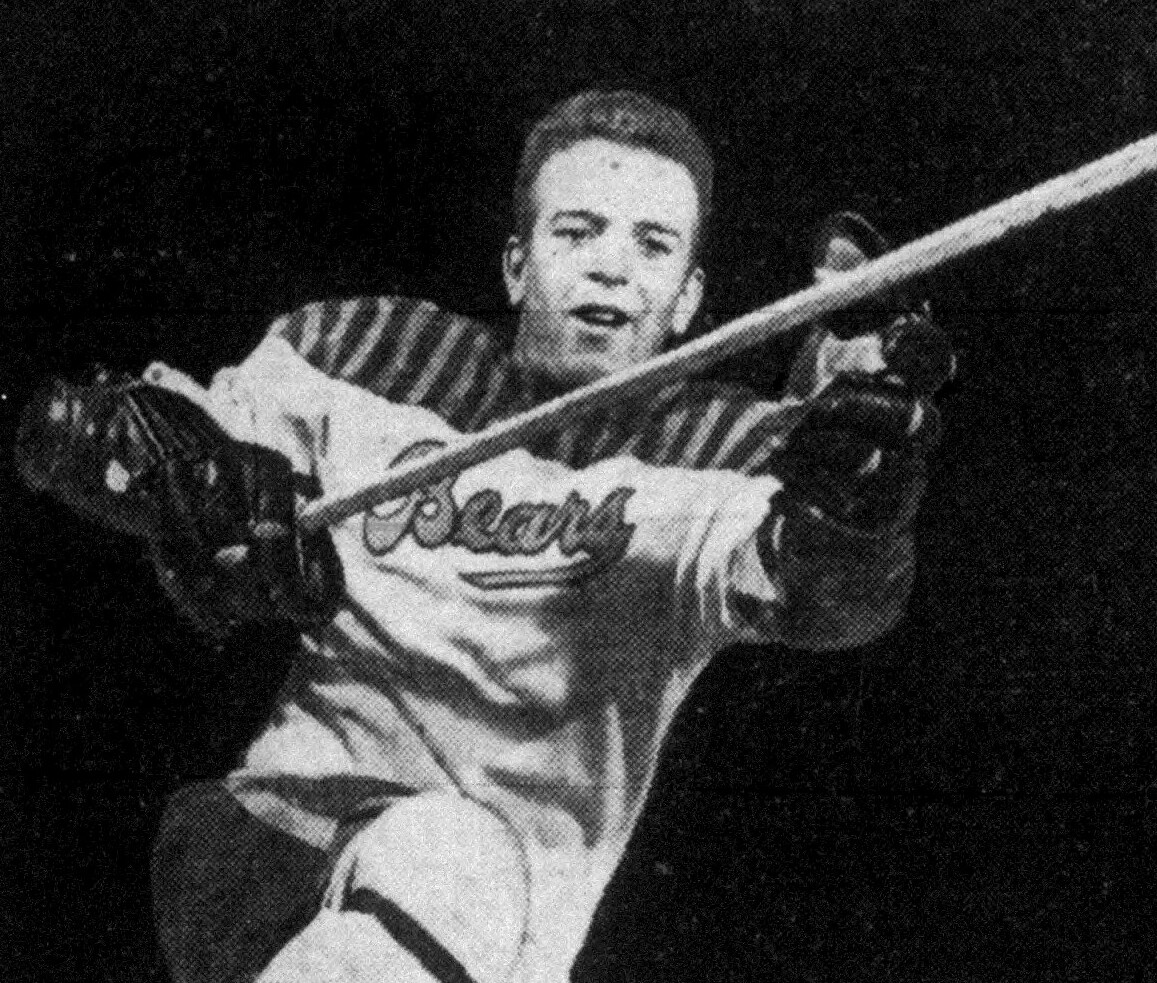
- Finnegan, circa 1947
- Born: December 18, 1927 Eveleth, Minnesota, USA
- Died: February 2, 1989 (aged 61) Duluth, Minnesota, USA
- Position: Center
- Played for: Minnesota; California; Rochester Mustangs; Sioux City Sunhawks
- Playing career: 1945–1952
Medal record
Men's ice hockey
Representing United States
World Championships
Bronze medal – third place	1949 Stockholm	Team

Patrick Henry Finnegan (1927-1989) was an American ice hockey center who won a bronze medal at the 1949 World Championships.

== Career ==
After winning the first State Championship for Eveleth High School Finnegan joined the program at Minnesota. After only a year with the Gophers, Finnegan transferred to California and performed remarkably for the Golden Bears, earning AHCA First Team All-American honors.

Finnegan would move on swiftly once more, leaving the team after 1948 to prepare for the 1949 World Championships. He played for the US National Team with legends like Charlie Holt, Jack Riley, Jack Kelley and Bruce Mather. The team swept through the preliminary round with ease, scoring 12 goals in all three games. In the first game of the final round they suffered a stunning defeat at the hands of Switzerland, whom they had defeated three days before by a score of 12–5. The team could ill afford another loss but their next opponent was Canada and the US's gold medal hopes were ended with a 7–2 loss. The team recovered with three consecutive wins, including over gold-medalist Czechoslovakia, to earn a bronze medal.

== Awards and honors ==
Award	Year
AHCA First Team All-American	1947–48
