= Minnesota Outlaws =

- City: East Bethel, Minnesota
- League: United States Premier Hockey League Premier Division
- Division: North
- Founded: 2014
- Home arena: East Bethel Ice Arena
- Owner: Jason Porter
- Head coach: Don Babineau

Franchise history
- 2014–2018: Ironwood Fighting Yoopers
- 2018–2022: Rum River Mallards
- 2022–2025: Isanti Outlaws
- 2025–present: Minnesota Outlaws

The Isanti Outlaws are a junior ice hockey team based in Isanti, Minnesota. They compete in the United States Premier Hockey League (USPHL) Premier Division. The team plays its home games at Isanti Ice Arena.

== History ==
Formed in the summer of 2018, the Rum River Mallards joined the United States Premier Hockey League (USPHL) Premier Division as a member of the Midwest-West Division. The team was initially led by team president Glen Lucken and Brad Zangs as its first head coach and general manager. A group of investors, including Zangs, purchased the Ironwood Fighting Yoopers who were established in 2014 competing in the Minnesota Junior Hockey League (MnJHL) one season before joining the USPHL from 2016 to 2018.

Rum River earned their first victory on September 28, 2018, defeating the host Hudson Havoc 6–4. After 17 games played, the team was sold to local businessman Eddy Wilkinson who hired new head coach, Jimmy Jensen.

The Mallards' inaugural season ended with 51 points, one point back of the Minnesota Blue Ox, despite two regular season games being cancelled. Unable to reschedule those games before the playoffs, the Blue Ox hosted the best-of-three series as the higher seed. The Mallards defeated the Blue Ox in the second game 11–6 before being eliminated the following night.

After a good start to their second season, Jimmy Jensen stepped away from the bench for family reasons. He was replaced in early December by Triston Jensen, a former goaltender who played in both the MnJHL and USPHL. Triston played collegiate hockey at the ACHA level with Saginaw Valley State University. Rum River ended the 2019–20 season as the fifth seed with another playoff matchup against the Blue Ox. After winning the first game, the Minnesota Blue Ox responded by winning the final two games to advance in the division playoffs.

After four seasons as the Mallards team owner Jason Porter announced a new identity, Isanti Outlaws, in April 2022. Three years later, the Franchise relocated to East Bethel, Minnesota and rebranded as the Minnesota Outlaws.

== Season-by-season ==
Season	GP	W	L	OTL	Pts	GF	GA	Finish	Playoffs
Ironwood Fighting Yoopers
Minnesota Junior Hockey League
2014–15	42	3	37	2	8	96	371	8th of 8, Minnesota Div. 13th of 14, MJHL	Lost Div. Quarterfinal series, 0–2 (Rochester Ice Hawks)
USPHL Midwest
2015–16	dormant								
United States Premier 3 Hockey League
2016–17	41	19	16	6	44	155	168	4th of 7, Midwest Div. t-15th of 27, USP3HL	Lost Div. Quarterfinal series, 0–2 (Alpena Flyers)
USPHL Premier
2017–18	43	16	25	2	34	164	208	t-6th of 9, Midwest-West Div. t-33rd of 44, USPHL Premier	Lost Div. Quarterfinal series, 0–2 (Minnesota Blue Ox)
Rum River Mallards
2018–19	42	25	16	1	51	170	108	5th of 9, Midwest-West Div. 23rd of 52, USPHL-Premier	Lost Div. Quarterfinal series, 1–2 (Minnesota Blue Ox)
2019–20	44	26	17	1	53	207	154	5th of 9, Midwest-West Div. 20th of 52, USPHL-Premier	Lost Div. Quarterfinal series, 1–2 (Minnesota Blue Ox)
2020–21	44	9	33	2	20	123	222	7th of 9, Midwest-West Div. 52nd of 62, USPHL-Premier	Lost Div. Quarterfinal series, 0–2 (Minnesota Moose)
2021–22	44	11	31	2	24	143	245	7th of 8, Midwest-West Div. 55th of 64, USPHL-Premier	Lost Div. Quarterfinal series, 0–2 (Wisconsin Rapids Riverkings)
Isanti Outlaws
2022–23	44	20	23	1	41	149	200	7th of 9, Midwest-West Div. 45nd of 70, USPHL-Premier	Lost Div. Quarterfinal series, 0–2 (Minnesota Squatch)
2023–24	44	13	30	1	27	129	222	7th of 9, Midwest-West Div. 47th of 61, USPHL-Premier	Lost Div. Quarterfinal series, 0–2 (Minnesota Squatch)
2024–25	44	7	34	3	17	106	274	8th of 9, North Div. 65th of 73, USPHL-Premier	Lost Div. Quarterfinal series, 0–2 (Minnesota Squatch)
Minnesota Outlaws
2025–26	15	1	14	0	2	38	127	Folded	

== Former logos ==
Isanti Outlaws
