= Minnesota Arctic Blast =

- City: Minneapolis, Minnesota
- Founded: 1994
- Home arena: Target Center
- Colors: Black, Blue, Silver, Red, White
- Murphy Cups: None
- Conference Championships: None
- Division Championships: 1994, 1996

Franchise history
- Minnesota Arctic Blast (1994, 1996)

The Minnesota Arctic Blast were a professional roller hockey team based in Minneapolis, Minnesota, United States, that played in the Central Division of the Eastern Conference of the Roller Hockey International League.

The team's home arena was the Target Center.

== See also ==
- Minnesota Blue Ox
