= St. Paul Fighting Saints =

The St. Paul Fighting Saints are a defunct professional ice hockey team. Based in Saint Paul, Minnesota, they played the 1992–93 season in the American Hockey Association. The Fighting Saints played home games at the Minnesota State Fair coliseum, now known as the Lee & Rose Warner Coliseum.

Coached by Dave Langevin, the team compiled a record of 21 wins, 5 losses, and 4 overtime losses in its only season of play. The league, along with all teams, suspended operations on January 29, 1993.
