= Phoenix Roadrunners (IHL) =

Defunct American ice hockey team

- City: Phoenix, Arizona, United States
- League: International Hockey League
- Division: South
- Founded: 1979
- Folded: 1997
- Home arena: Arizona Veterans Memorial Coliseum
- Colors: Blue, gold, white
- Affiliates: Mississippi Sea Wolves (ECHL)

Franchise history
- 1979–1987: Indianapolis Checkers
- 1987–1988: Colorado Rangers
- 1988–1989: Denver Rangers
- 1989–1997: Phoenix Roadrunners

The Phoenix Roadrunners were a minor league professional ice hockey team in the International Hockey League. The team was housed at Arizona Veterans Memorial Coliseum. The team played in the IHL from 1989 to 1997. The IHL Roadrunners were named for a World Hockey Association team of the same name. The IHL Roadrunners used a similar skating cartoon bird logo as the WHA team with different colors, without the outline of the state of Arizona.

In 1996, the original Winnipeg Jets relocated to Phoenix, becoming the Phoenix Coyotes, now the Arizona Coyotes. After one year competing with the Coyotes for fans, the Roadrunners folded at the end of the 1996-97 season. Coincidentally, the Coyotes' former American Hockey League affiliate, the Tucson Roadrunners, share the name and similar logo to the displaced IHL team.

== Notable NHL alumni ==
List of Phoenix Roadrunners alumni who played more than 100 games in Phoenix and 100 or more games in the National Hockey League.

- Dan Bylsma
- Ken McRae
- Brent Thompson
- Yanic Perreault
- Byron Dafoe

== See also ==
- List of Phoenix Roadrunners (IHL) players
