= American Hockey Association (1992–93) =

The American Hockey Association (AHA) was a semi-professional ice hockey league that operated for the 1992–93 season. The league operated independently, and was not affiliated with any higher league. The league operated with central ownership of teams, presided over by Charlie Hodgins. The league scheduled exhibition games with the Russian Red Army team, and also played against them in the all-star game. The league suspended operations on January 29, 1993, resulting in no champion being declared.

== Teams ==
Five teams participated in the league.

Team	City
Bismarck Bulls	Bismarck, North Dakota
Fargo–Moorhead Express	Moorhead, Minnesota
Green Bay Ice	Green Bay, Wisconsin
Minnesota Iron Rangers	Hibbing, Minnesota
St. Paul Fighting Saints	Saint Paul, Minnesota

== Final standings ==
Final standings as of January 29, 1993.

Teams	GP	Wins	Losses	OTL	GF	GA	Points
Fargo–Moorhead Express	30	23	7	0	169	117	46
St. Paul Fighting Saints	30	21	5	4	181	111	46
Green Bay Ice	30	17	13	0	181	144	34
Minnesota Iron Rangers	27	8	18	1	101	144	17
Bismarck Bulls	35	7	27	1	149	265	15
