= Terrace River Kings =

Senior ice hockey team

- City: Terrace, British Columbia
- League: CIHL
- Founded: 2004
- Home arena: Terrace Sportsplex
- Colours
- General manager: Tammy Braid
- Head coach: Stephen Turner
- Website: terraceriverkings.net

Championships
- League: 2015; 2017; 2018; 2022; 2024; 2025
- Provincial: 2025

The Terrace River Kings are a senior ice hockey team in the Central Interior Hockey League (CIHL) based in Terrace, British Columbia.

== History ==
The team debuted in the 2004–05 CIHL season. In 2024, the team defeated the Williams Lake Stampeders in a best-of-3 playoff series to win the CIHL championship Cameron Kerr Memorial Cup. The trophy's namesake was a former River Kings player who was struck and killed by an automobile in a hit-and-run while walking in 2018. The team then went on to win the BC Hockey Senior AA championship Coy Cup after beating the Powell River Regals 5-4 in triple overtime. The team won its second Cameron Kerr Memorial Cup in 2025.

Season-by-season record
Season	GP	W	L	T	OTL	GF	GA	Pts	Finish	Playoffs
2004–05	16	7	6	3	-	83	79	17	3rd place	Semifinal loss
2005–06	20	11	4	5	-	83	72	27	2nd place	Final loss
2006–07	20	6	13	1	-	83	107	13	4th place	Did not make playoffs
2007–08	16	7	9	-	-	47	64	14	3rd place	Did not make playoffs
2008–09	18	9	7	-	2	75	81	20	2nd place	Quarterfinal loss
2009–10	16	3	12	-	1	54	97	7	5th place	Did not make playoffs
2010–11	16	7	9	-	-	55	55	14	3rd place	Quarterfinal loss
2011–12	18	8	10	-	-	71	58	16	2nd place	Semifinal loss
2012–13	18	9	7	-	2	81	74	20	2nd place	Quarterfinal loss
2013–14	18	12	5	-	1	97	59	25	1st place	Semifinal loss
2014–15	16	14	2	-	-	104	58	28	1st place	League champions
2015–16	16	11	3	-	2	87	48	24	2nd place	Semifinal loss
2016–17	16	11	3	-	2	83	53	24	3rd place	League champions
2017–18	16	10	4	1	1	99	68	22	1st place	League champions
2018–19	16	8	8	-	-	83	77	16	4th place	Final loss
2019–20	16	14	2	-	-	121	73	28	1st place	Final loss
2020–21	Season cancelled									
2021–22	14	11	2	-	-	74	38	23	1st place	League champions
2022–23	16	9	4	-	3	102	80	21	2nd place	Final loss
2023–24	18	15	3	-	-	96	47	30	1st place	League champions
2024–25	18	16	2	-	-	108	57	32	1st place	League champions
2025–26	18	14	4	-	-	98	51	29	1st place	Final loss

Source: "Terrace River Kings - Roster, News, Stats & more". eliteprospects.com.

== Sources ==
- "CIHL Archives: 2023–24 season". North Coast Review. 11 September 2023.
- Bogstie, Ben (25 November 2020). "Central Interior Hockey League cancels 2020/21 season". Terrace Standard. Black Press Media.
- Bogstie, Ben (19 October 2021). "Skeena Voices | The man behind the Terrace River Kings". Terrace Standard. Black Press Media.
- Carlson, Shane (27 March 2024). "Powell River Regals open 2024 Coy Cup with tie versus Terrace". The Peak. Glacier Media Group.
- Waddell, Justin (28 March 2024). "Regals poised for another Coy Cup win as tournament gets underway in Powell River". My Powell River Now.
- "BC Hockey 2023–2024 handbook" (PDF). British Columbia Amateur Hockey Association.
- Bhathal, Harvin (17 March 2025). "Terrace River Kings win second straight Cameron Kerr Trophy". Terrace Standard. Black Press Media.
