= Yukon Huskies =

Yukon Huskies may refer to:

- UConn Huskies, the intercollegiate athletic teams representing the University of Connecticut, USA ("UConn" being a homophone for "Yukon")
- Whitehorse Huskies, an ice hockey team based in Whitehorse, Yukon, Canada

== See also ==
- Husky, a type of dog associated with polar regions such as the Yukon territory of Canada
