= Kenora Thistles (disambiguation) =

Kenora Thistles is the name of several Canadian ice hockey teams based in Kenora, Ontario and may refer to:

- Kenora Thistles - Defunct Senior professional ice hockey club, 1907 Stanley Cup champions.
- Kenora Thistles (1910s) - Defunct Senior ice hockey club, challenged for Allan Cup in 1911 and 1914.
- Kenora Thistles (1926–1940) - Defunct Junior A ice hockey club, 1940 Abbott Cup champions.
- Kenora Thistles (intermediate) - Defunct Intermediate A ice hockey club, 1953 Edmonton Journal Trophy champions.
- Kenora Thistles (1968–1982) - Defunct Junior A ice hockey club, founded as the "Muskies".
- Kenora Thistles (CCHL) - Defunct Senior ice hockey club, 1971–1973 in Canadian Central Hockey League.
- Kenora Thistles (senior) - Defunct Senior 'AAA' ice hockey club that competed for the Allan Cup.
- Kenora Thistles - A current team competing in the Manitoba Midget 'AAA' Hockey League
