= Mary Dunn (sports executive) =

Canadian sports executive (1903–1965)

- Born: February 7, 1903; Roland, Manitoba, Canada
- Died: January 10, 1965 (aged 61); Winnipeg, Manitoba, Canada
- Education: University of Manitoba
- Known for: Dominion Women's Amateur Hockey Association; Women's Amateur Athletic Federation of Canada
- Spouse: Jimmy Dunn

Mary Dunn (née Armitage; February 7, 1903 – January 10, 1965) was a Canadian sports executive. She played on the Manitoba Bisons women's ice hockey team while in university, then became an executive with the Winnipeg Women's Senior Hockey League and the Manitoba Ladies' Hockey Association. She later served as vice-president, and then president of the Dominion Women's Amateur Hockey Association, where she arranged playoffs for the Canadian women's hockey championship. She was married to fellow sports executive Jimmy Dunn, and co-ordinated amateur sports for ladies as the vice-president then president of the Manitoba branch of the Women's Amateur Athletic Federation of Canada. She later served as president of the Winnipeg Community Chest, the Central Volunteer Bureau of Manitoba, and the Oriole Community Club in Winnipeg.

== Early life and education ==
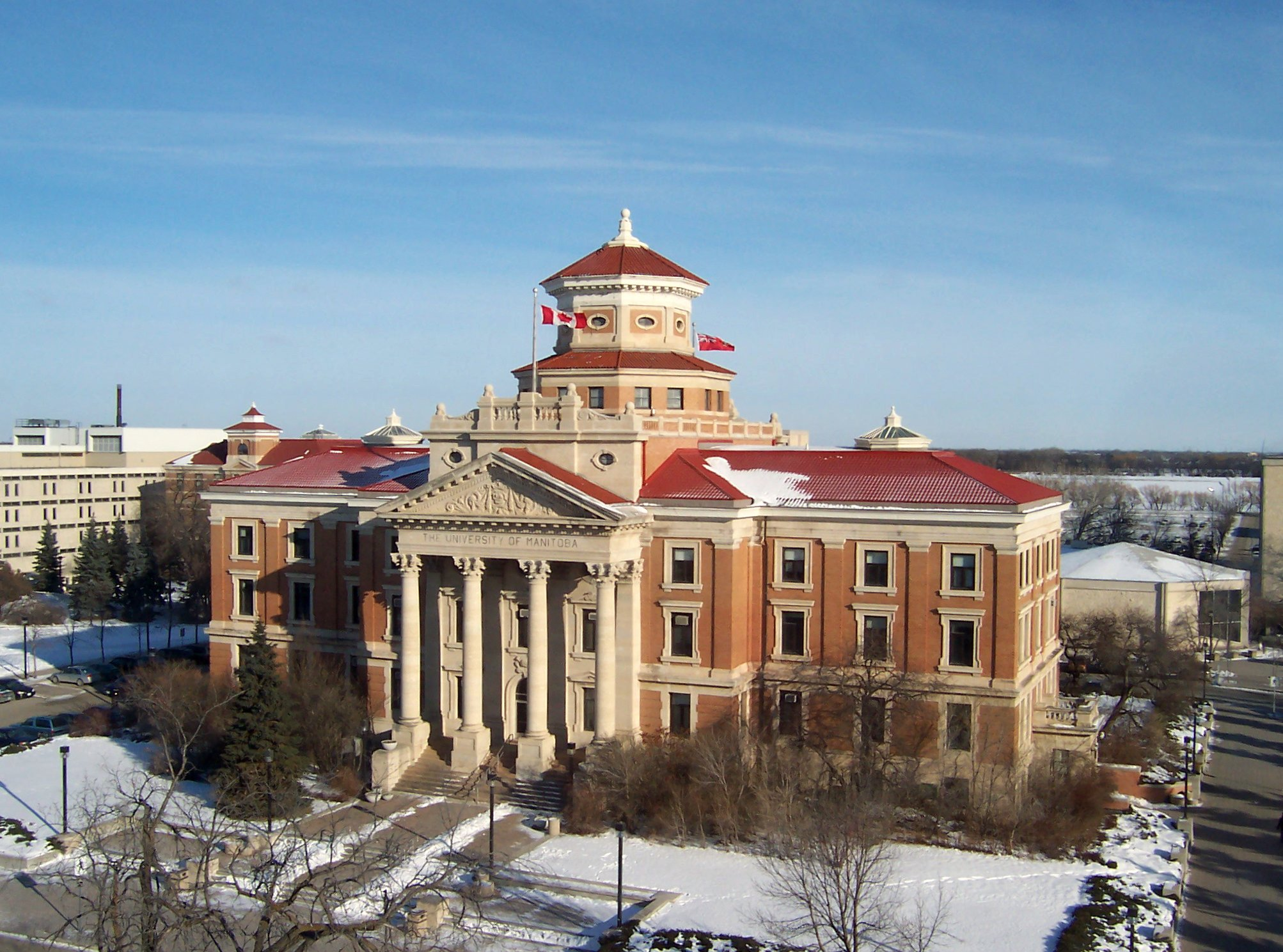
University of Manitoba administration building

Mary Armitage was born on February 7, 1903, in the Rural Municipality of Roland, Manitoba. She grew up on the family farm southeast of the village of Roland as the youngest of two daughters to Robert and Annie Armitage who had English heritage.

Armitage moved to Winnipeg in 1921, attended the Manitoba Agricultural College at the University of Manitoba, and was elected president of student athletics in 1924. She played as a centre on the Manitoba Bisons women's ice hockey team, and scored the winning goal in a 1926 Banff Winter Carnival semi-final game versus the Vancouver Amazons. Her team practiced with Andy Blair and other members of the Bison men's hockey team. She recalled in a 1938 interview that if a girl got in their way, the men "would just lift her up and dump her elsewhere". Journalist Jimmy Coo quipped that as a result, Armitage "got many a free ride".

Armitage graduated from the University of Manitoba with a Bachelor of Science and later married Jimmy Dunn, a sports executive from Winnipeg.

== Sports and athletics executive ==
During the mid-1930s, Dunn was vice-president of the Manitoba branch of the Women's Amateur Athletic Federation of Canada (WAAF of C), which oversaw all amateur sport for ladies in the province, and sought to organize a women's softball organization for Manitoba. She helped plan the Manitoba Girls' Track and Field Championships and implemented the same events as the Canadian Track and Field Championships. The Manitoba championships were realized as a two-person effort co-ordinated by Dunn and Edith McKenzie at Sargent Park in Winnipeg. Dunn also served as an on-field timing and scoring official for track and field events at municipal and provincial competitions. Dunn co-ordinated fundraising efforts to send Manitoba's best track and field athletes to London, Ontario, for the Canadian national team trials in advance of the 1934 British Empire Games.

By May 1935, the Manitoba branch of WAAF of C was operated solely by Dunn and McKenzie after all of the remaining executive officers had retired. In 1936, Dunn was awarded the first honorary life membership in the Manitoba branch of the WAAF of C, for contributions to women's sport in Manitoba. She later served as president of the Winnipeg Branch of the WAAF of C for one season, and focused her efforts on basketball, softball, and track and field. The Great Depression and World War II led to the end of the WAAF of C, but Vince Leah wrote in The Winnipeg Tribune that Dunn was one of the association's more aggressive officials and was not to blame for its demise.

== Ice hockey executive ==
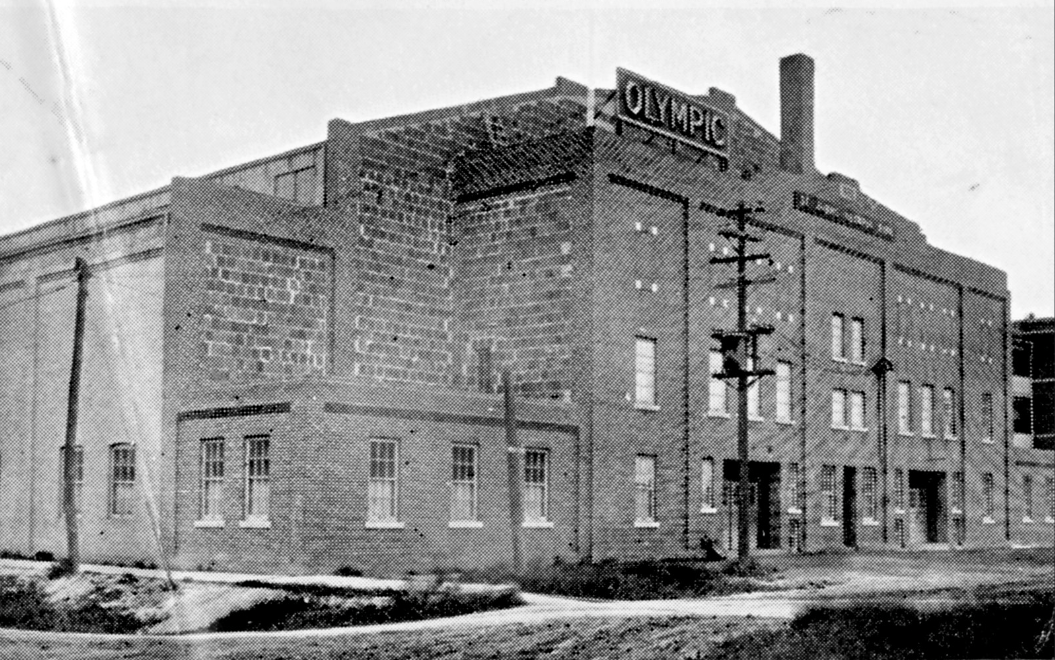
Olympic Rink c. 1925

Dunn was secretary of the Manitoba Ladies' Hockey Association formed in 1933, which sought to organize provincial playoffs and enter a Manitoba team into the Dominion Women's Amateur Hockey Association (DWAHA) championship. She also served as the secretary-treasurer and timekeeper of the Winnipeg Women's Senior Hockey League, and regularly attended games at the Olympic Rink where her husband was a timekeeper and junior ice hockey convenor.

At the 1935 DWAHA annual meeting in Winnipeg, Dunn was elected one of three vice-presidents. The DWAHA sought to grow its membership across Canada, expected Saskatchewan to join the six provinces already represented, and to use the national playoffs for the Lady Bessborough Trophy to raise funds and increase the profile of women's hockey in Canada. The DWAHA wanted to showcase its talents by sending an all-star team to Europe to play against teams in France and England; and to petition the Canadian Olympic Committee and the International Olympic Committee for women's hockey to be a demonstration sport at the 1940 Winter Olympics.

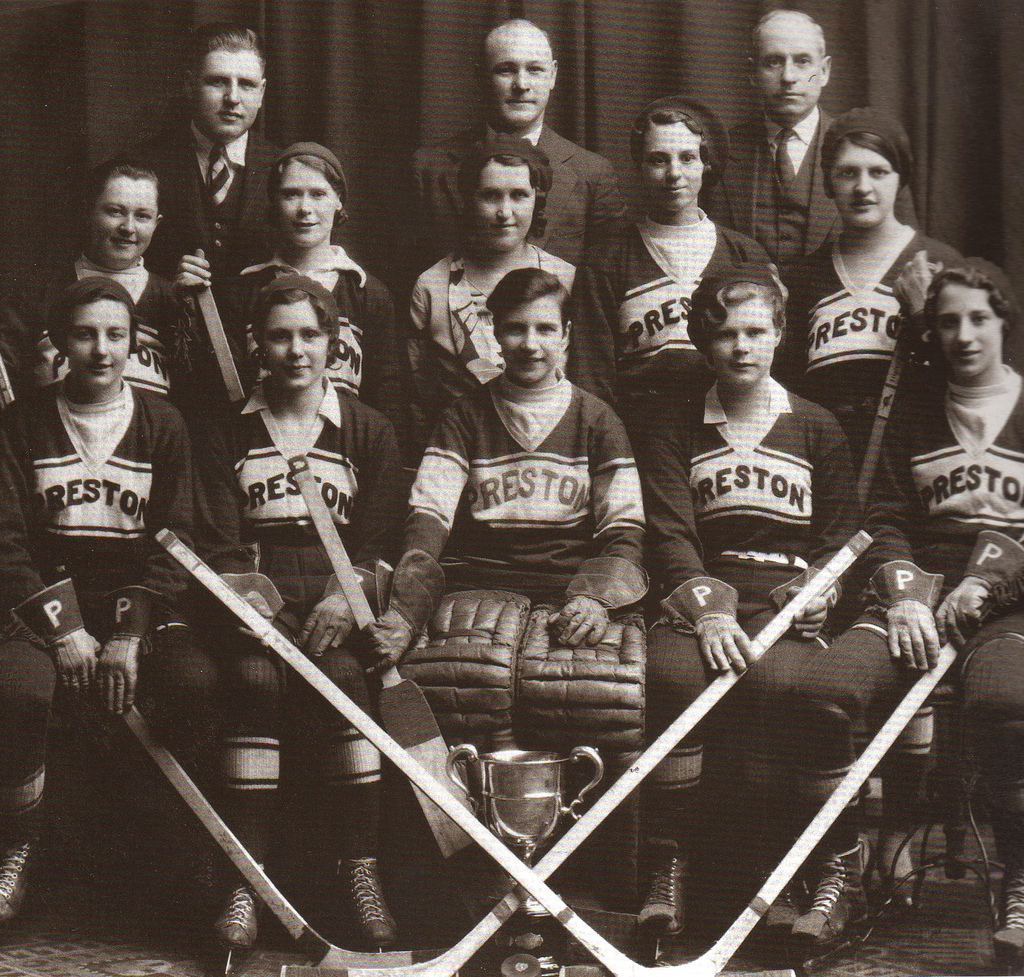
Preston Rivulettes

Dunn attended the WAAF of C general meeting in November 1938, and her application for the DWAHA to affiliate was approved after two seasons without such an agreement. The renewed affiliation then allowed the DWAHA to partake in internationally sanctioned hockey. At the same meeting, she supported the Ladies Ontario Hockey Association who threatened to withdraw if not given an increased number of votes based on proportional representation of registered members. When the issue was suggested to be resolved by a mail-in vote, Dunn did not understand why the men should get one month to decide the matter, as she had mistakenly interpreted the proposal to be a "male" vote.

Dunn oversaw the playoffs in Western Canada as the vice-president of the DWAHA, and according to the Winnipeg Free Press, "did everything in her power" to assist the Winnipeg Olympics in going to Ontario to play the Preston Rivulettes for the Lady Bessborough Trophy. After she succeeded Bobbie Rosenfeld as the DWAHA president for the 1940 season, Dunn was unable to organize a national championship when the Winnipeg Olympics and the Preston Rivulettes were unable to reach an agreement to guarantee travel expenses. When the Winnipeg Olympics declined to accept the Lady Bessborough Trophy by default of the Rivulettes not travelling west, Dunn declared the title undecided and no team was awarded the trophy.

The DWAHA ceased operations after the 1940 season. After the war, Dunn was the hockey representative to the Canadian Federation of University Women, and presented the Lady Bessborough Trophy to the Winnipeg All-stars who won the senior women's championship in 1950. Winnipeg Free Press sports editor Maurice Smith summarized Dunn's career as a lifetime contributor to sports, and that she was "one of the boys". Dunn and her husband were both credited by The Winnipeg Tribune for their tremendous contributions to sport in Winnipeg.

== Community service ==
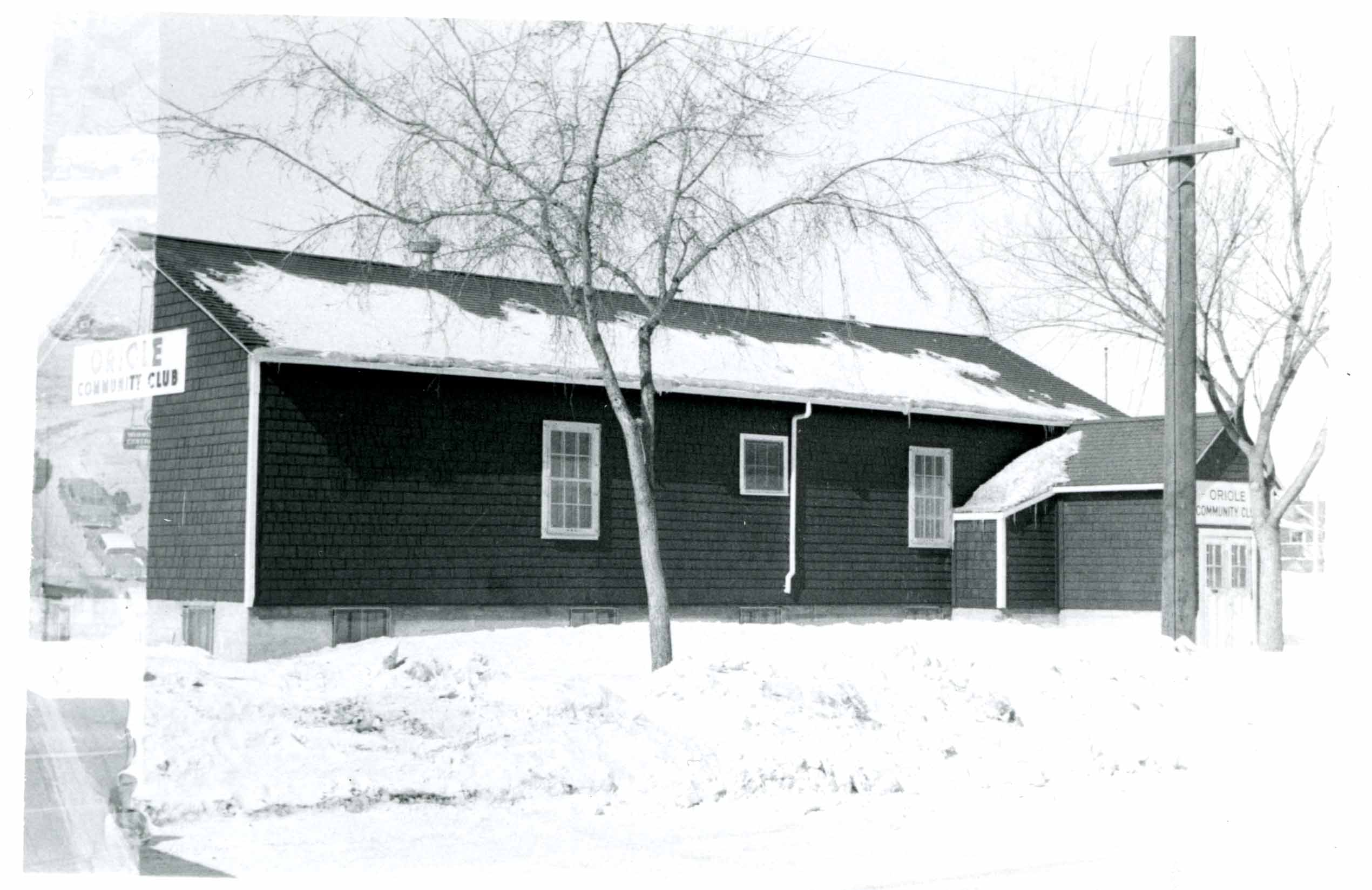
Oriole Community Club c. 1948

Dunn was one of the founding officers of the Oriole Community Club in Winnipeg in 1948. She was president of its women's auxiliary in 1953, and oversaw the club's annual May Day tea social. She served as a vice-president of the club from 1959 to 1961, and as president from 1961 to 1964. Under her leadership, the club operated a youth sports program and had seven minor ice hockey teams as of 1961.

Vince Leah of The Winnipeg Tribune praised Dunn's volunteer work, and wrote that her efforts had made the Oriole Community Club "one of the city's better community centres". She received a citation from the National Recreation Association of America in July 1959, in recognition of her career of contributions to athletics and recreation in Winnipeg.

Dunn also served as a president of the Winnipeg Community Chest and the Central Volunteer Bureau of Manitoba. The bureau maintained a pool of volunteers to provide help to 94 health and welfare organizations in Winnipeg including the Canadian Red Cross, and Dunn assisted with the Winnipeg Block Plan that co-ordinated the city-wide collection of donations for local charities and service organizations.

== Personal life ==
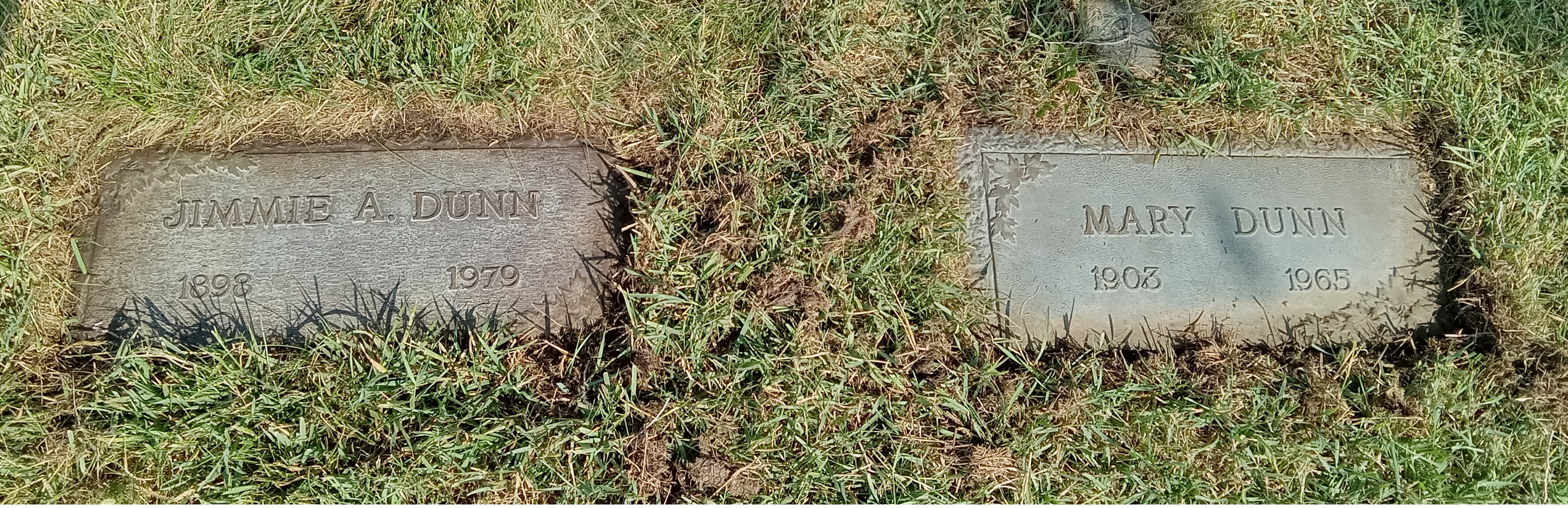
Dunn's grave marker

The Dunns had one son named Gary, born in Winnipeg on July 8, 1936. Her father died in Roland during the morning on July 19, 1936, and her mother died 13 hours later at the hospital in Carman, Manitoba. The Dunns participated in five-pin bowling with the Canadian National Railway mixed league. She later played in a five-pin bowling league with an Orioles CC ladies team. They had a summer cottage in Sandy Hook, Manitoba, and were members of the Sandy Hook Community Club and the Harstone United Church in Winnipeg. She died on January 10, 1965, at the Winnipeg General Hospital at age 61, and was interred in Garry Memorial Park in Winnipeg – later known as Thomson in the Park Cemetery.
