= Nelson Cubs =

Canadian ice hockey team

The Nelson Cubs were a Canadian Senior ice hockey team based in Nelson, British Columbia, Canada. The Cubs were one-time British Columbia Coy Cup Senior Champions.

== History ==
In 1921-22 the Nelson Cubs won the Coy Cup as the Senior B Amateur Hockey Champions of British Columbia.

In the following year (1922–23), this senior men's team won the inaugural league championship of the West Kootenay League, which at that time was the top tier senior ice hockey league operating in eastern British Columbia. Its teams played hockey at the highest level of competition of its day.

That season the Cubs advanced to the British Columbia senior hockey playoffs. They won the first three rounds of the playoffs but lost the finals series (a two-game total-goals affair) 14 goals to 4 to the Vancouver Young Liberals team.
