= Cariboo Hockey League =

The Cariboo Hockey League was a senior and intermediate ice hockey league in the Cariboo District of British Columbia. It operated within the British Columbia Amateur Hockey Association.

The league started in 1936. It was the major Senior A League in the Cariboo Region of British Columbia for a long time. In 1979, the league merged with other shrinking leagues to form the British Columbia Senior Hockey League. The league returned for one season in 1983–84 before disappearing.

== Teams ==
- 100 Mile House Blazers
- Kamloops Cowboys
- Prince George Mohawks
- Quesnel Kangaroos
- Vanderhoof Bears
- Williams Lake Stampeders
