= Jimmy Dunn (sports executive) =

Canadian sports executive (1898–1979)

- Born: James Archibald Dunn; March 24, 1898; Winnipeg, Manitoba, Canada
- Died: January 7, 1979 (aged 80); Winnipeg, Manitoba, Canada
- Occupation: Canadian National Railway clerk
- Known for: Canadian Amateur Hockey Association; Manitoba Amateur Hockey Association; Manitoba Junior Hockey League; Mandak League
- Spouse: Mary Dunn
- Awards: Hockey Hall of Fame; Manitoba Hockey Hall of Fame
- Military career
- Allegiance: Canada
- Branch: Canadian Expeditionary Force
- Service years: 1916–1918
- Rank: Lieutenant
- Conflicts: World War I

James Archibald Dunn (March 24, 1898 – January 7, 1979) was a Canadian sports executive involved in ice hockey, baseball, fastpitch softball, athletics, football and curling. He was president of the Canadian Amateur Hockey Association (CAHA) from 1955 to 1957, after five years as vice-president. He assumed control of the CAHA when it failed to produce a Canada men's national team which would win the Ice Hockey World Championships, and recommended forming a national all-star team based on the nucleus of the reigning Allan Cup champion. Wanting to create goodwill in international hockey, accompanied the Kenora Thistles on an exhibition tour of Japan, then arranged for the Japan men's national team to tour Canada. In junior ice hockey, he was opposed mass transfers of players to the stronger teams sponsored by the National Hockey League, and supported weaker provincial champions to have additional players during the Memorial Cup playoffs. He later represented the CAHA as a member of the Hockey Hall of Fame selection committee for 15 years.

Dunn began in hockey as secretary of the Winnipeg Junior and Juvenile Hockey League, followed by 17 years as secretary, convenor and timekeeper at the Olympic Rink after joining the Manitoba Junior Hockey League (MJHL). He sat on the Manitoba Amateur Hockey Association (MAHA) executive from 1929 to 1954, and was president from 1945 to 1950. He openly discussed hockey issues with the press, and encouraged rural Manitoba communities to develop hockey programs. His presidency coincided with the MAHA's biggest growth, best financial situation, and grants to develop minor ice hockey. He later served as commissioner of the MJHL from 1964 to 1966, agreed to televise games and sought to increase attendance. He co-founded an annual golf tournament to benefit retired hockey players, which led to the establishment of the Manitoba Hockey Players' Foundation.

After managing a baseball team in the 1930s, Dunn served on the Manitoba Diamond Ball Association executive, and was president of the Greater Winnipeg Senior Baseball League from 1942 to 1946. He helped establish the Western Canada Baseball Association to govern senior and junior baseball, as its first vice-president in 1945. He oversaw girls' fastpitch softball and served as president of the Greater Winnipeg Senior Girls' Softball League from 1941 to 1946. He led efforts to establish a provincial governing body for men's and women's fastpitch softball, then became the founding president of the Manitoba Fastball Association. He was elected the first president the Manitoba Senior Baseball League, and oversaw its reorganization into the Mandak League with expansion into North Dakota in 1950, then served as league president for two seasons.

Dunn was a lieutenant with the Canadian Expeditionary Force during World War I, and a Canadian Army Reserve commanding officer during World War II. He was an executive with the Manitoba branch of the Amateur Athletic Union of Canada, and the original timekeeper of the Winnipeg Blue Bombers for 42 years. He was president of the Winnipeg Thistle Curling Club, and served on the Manitoba Curling Association executive. He was married to fellow sports executive Mary Dunn, and was known locally as "Mr. Hockey". The Winnipeg Tribune wrote that "no single individual in Manitoba has made a more significant contribution to sport", and that his leadership assured the success of any sport organization. He was a life member of multiple sporting organizations, and was inducted into the builder category of the Hockey Hall of Fame and the Manitoba Hockey Hall of Fame.

== Early life ==
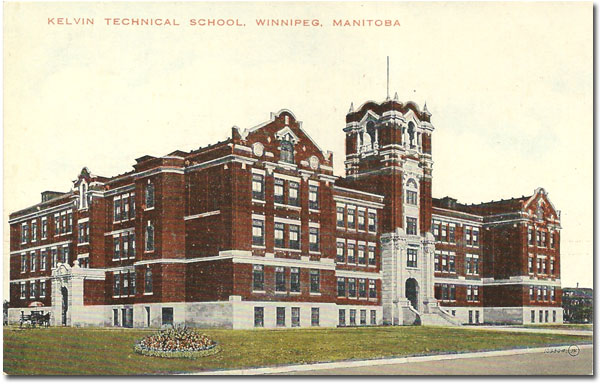
Kelvin Technical High School c. 1912

James Archibald Dunn was born on March 24, 1898, in Winnipeg, Manitoba. He grew up as the youngest in a family of four daughters and three sons to parents John and Christina Dunn. His family had Scottish heritage, and his father worked as a pipefitter and a Canadian Pacific Railway foreman. Dunn played soccer and lacrosse as a youth. He attended Kelvin Technical High School during its inaugural year of operation in 1912, and claimed to have begun the school's athletic cheer while he was a student.

Dunn worked as a law clerk when he enlisted in the Canadian Expeditionary Force (CEF) in Winnipeg on February 25, 1916. He was assigned to 184th Battalion, CEF, where he played ice hockey and served in France during World War I. He stated that his most cherished memory while in France was playing baseball against Hank Gowdy of the New York Giants, who was stationed at an American aerodrome. Dunn had achieved the rank of lieutenant when discharged in 1918. During his service, he was wounded and earned a military medal which he would not talk about, and quit playing hockey as a result of trench foot. After the war, he began a career working for the Canadian National Railway (CN) in 1920 as a clerk at the Fort Rouge railway yard in Winnipeg.

== Ice hockey career ==
=== Winnipeg league executive ===
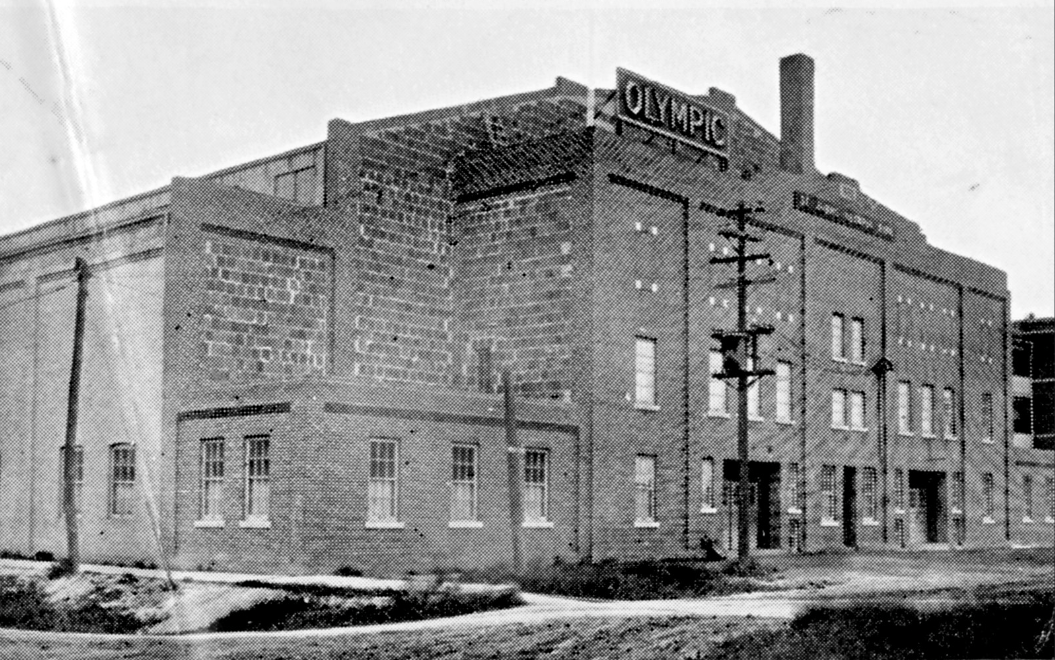
Olympic Rink c. 1925

Dunn began his ice hockey executive career as the secretary of the Winnipeg Junior and Juvenile Hockey League during the 1926–27 season. The league became the north division of the Manitoba Junior Hockey League (MJHL) when it affiliated with the Manitoba Amateur Hockey Association (MAHA) in 1927, and he served as the league's secretary, convenor and timekeeper at the Olympic Rink until 1943. He helped oversee revisions to the league's constitution in 1929, and was a member of the MAHA executive representing the league and junior ice hockey in Manitoba from 1929 to 1942.

The league had it greatest number of teams during the 1930–31 season when it welcomed the Kenora Thistles as an out-of-province team, then divided its 16 teams into two divisions. The Great Depression reduced the league to eight teams for the 1936–37 season when it accepted another out-of-town team in the Brandon Wheat Kings. Both the north and south divisions wanted to play games at the larger Winnipeg Amphitheatre since they could increase their share of the gate receipts. Multiple disputes arose over the scheduling of games, which led to Dunn and fellow MAHA executives forming a special committee to arbitrate that all north division games be played at the Olympic Rink.

Teams in the north division of the MJHL struggled financially during World War II and sought a new financial arrangement for the 1940–41 season. The teams also disagreed on who played in which division, with some teams threatening to disband if their demands were not met. Dunn recommended to split the gate receipts evenly between the teams and the rink owners, and for the MAHA to subsidize the teams as needed. The north division played the season reduced to four teams. In the next season, Dunn arranged a three-day carnival at the Olympic Rink as a fundraiser to benefit the teams in the north division.

During his time with the Winnipeg Junior and Juvenile Hockey League, Dunn oversaw applications for the on-ice officials, and implemented a two-man refereeing system. He was credited by journalist Ralph Allen in The Winnipeg Tribune for employing more on-ice officials so they were not overworked, and that spectators had not developed any hatred towards any single referee. Dunn experimented with coloured hockey pucks in the midget age group of minor ice hockey, and had the CN paint shop prepare pucks in orange and later in yellow.

In the 1940–41 season, Dunn was elected president of the Winnipeg and District Intermediate League which included six teams at the Olympic Rink, and also served as president of the CN Hockey Club that played in the intermediate league. Dunn later organized the Big Four Hockey League, which included teams from CN, the Hudson's Bay Company and Eaton's. He recalled in a 1954 interview, that enthusiasm was high for the league and once the door of his office was torn off in a rush to buy tickets for a game.

=== Manitoba Amateur Hockey Association ===
==== Vice-president ====
Dunn served as second vice-president of the MAHA from 1942 to 1945, was chairman of the junior hockey committee and sat on the registration committee. The MAHA agreed to his recommendation to subsidize and maintain junior hockey during the war for the morale of the people and players. At the Canadian Amateur Hockey Association (CAHA) general meeting in 1944, Dunn supported resolutions to strictly enforce the ice hockey rules due to rough play in the 1944 Memorial Cup and for consistency in officiating. For the MJHL 1944–45 season, he oversaw negotiations that resulted in the first interlocking schedule between the north and south divisions, implemented of limits on the number of player transfers for balanced competition, encouraged rural communities to establish hockey programs, and rearranged divisions in the provincial playoffs to give rural teams a better chance against urban teams.

==== President ====
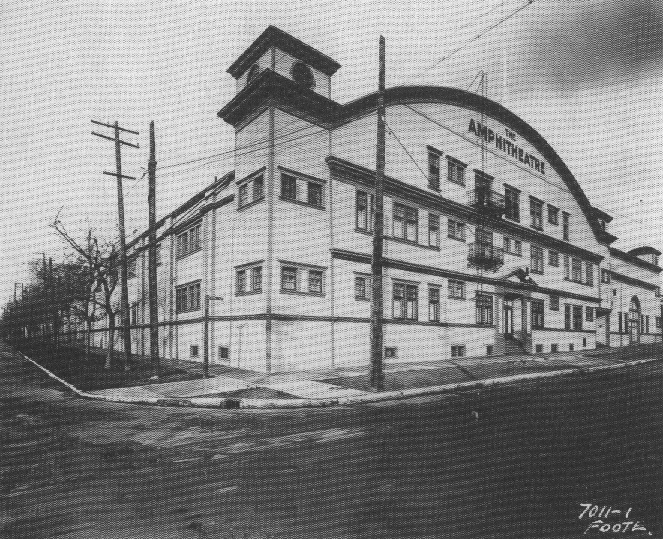
Winnipeg Amphitheatre

Dunn was elected president of the MAHA at the general meeting in October 1945, and served five consecutive one-year terms until 1950. He was immediately faced with an ultimatum from the north division teams of the MJHL who threatened to withdraw from the MAHA unless several demands were met. The teams felt that the south division was given preferential treatment, and sought to equally share games at the larger Winnipeg Amphitheatre and the profits from gate receipts. The north division complained about the lack of available ice time for practices and the deplorable dressing room conditions at the Olympic Rink, and felt that the MAHA had an obligation to make the upgrades if the rink would not. The Winnipeg Tribune reported that the concerns had developed over years of mismanagement and that Dunn committed the MAHA to discussing issues openly instead of closed-door meetings without the local press invited. After negotiations broke down, three junior teams withdrew and the MJHL operated with five teams in one division. Despite the loss of teams, MAHA registrations grew by more than 600 players and profits increased sixfold.

The stronger MJHL teams — the Winnipeg Rangers, Winnipeg Monarchs, Brandon Wheat Kings and Portage Terriers — were sponsored by National Hockey League (NHL) clubs and wanted to form an "A" division and play all games at the Winnipeg Amphitheatre for the 1946–47 season, and relegate all other teams to the "B" division at the Olympic Rink. The four teams were also opposed to any other teams being added to their division. The Winnipeg Tribune felt that these teams had pursued their own selfish interests with disregard for the general welfare of the league, and that creating the division would perpetuate the previous issues unless Dunn could negotiate a "minor miracle". Dunn and the MAHA executive chose to include the St. James Orioles as a fifth team in the "A" division after being convinced that the team was soundly operated and would be able to compete.

The Memorial Cup was the championship trophy for junior hockey overseen by the CAHA.

The MAHA implemented a 10-minute overtime period for all tied games as of the 1946–47 season. Dunn felt it was best for the teams to get used to the rules in place for the playoffs, and that spectators wanted to see overtime "to get their money's worth". During the same season, the MAHA executive encouraged construction of community rinks and targeted rural regions of Manitoba for growth. The MAHA also divided the juvenile, midget and bantam age groups of minor hockey into tiers, to give teams based in rural Manitoba an opportunity to enter the provincial playoffs at a lower calibre than urban teams. The MAHA established a "C" division of the MJHL to play at the Olympic Rink and retain more players who had graduated from minor hockey. Dunn felt that the 1947–48 season had been the most successful yet, praised rural communities for building rinks, and sought more rural leagues to operate for the whole season instead of forming a team solely for the provincial playoffs.

The Allan Cup was the championship trophy for senior hockey overseen by the CAHA.

Dunn represented the MAHA at general meetings of the CAHA, was a member of the national rules committee, sat on the Western Canada intermediate hockey committee to oversee the inter-provincial playoffs, and sought to establish a juvenile championship for minor hockey in Western Canada. His recommendation to the CAHA was approved that the location of the Allan Cup and Memorial Cup finals alternate between Eastern and Western Canada annually as of 1947. Dunn was one of three nominees from Western Canada to be second vice-president of the CAHA in a vote which elected Doug Grimston in 1947.

Dunn wanted the professional-amateur agreement between the CAHA and the NHL to benefit minor hockey in addition to junior and senior ice hockey. In 1948, the CAHA placed limits on the number of players which a junior hockey league could import from any minor hockey organization. He was pleased with the changes since he felt that Manitoba's players had been targeted by other parts of Canada and that losing fewer players would improve the MAHA's chances in the Memorial Cup or Allan Cup playoffs. He was opposed to players from Western Canada being transferred to the wealthy junior teams in Ontario and Quebec supported by the NHL, but his motion to stop the professional influence in junior hockey and the movement of players was defeated at the CAHA general meeting in 1949.

By the 1949–50 season, registrations with the MAHA had grown to exceed 4,000 players and included 125 teams outside of Winnipeg for the intermediate and minor hockey playoffs. Grants by the MAHA for the development of minor hockey in Manitoba grew from C$1,525 in 1946, to more than $6,000 by the end of the 1949–50 season. The Winnipeg Free Press wrote that Dunn's presidency coincided with the MAHA's biggest growth and best financial situation that was driven by profits from the junior hockey playoffs. Journalist Maurice Smith credited Dunn's leadership for the sustained growth, and that "when it came to making an important decision he has been unafraid upon whose toes he might tread".

==== Past-president ====
Dunn declined a sixth term as MAHA president and was succeeded by Harry Foxton in October 1950. In the 1950–51 season, Dunn was named to an executive position within the Winnipeg Buffaloes senior hockey team, and was president of the States-Dominion Hockey League which included teams in Manitoba and North Dakota. He remained involved with the MAHA and served as its convenor of senior hockey and chairman of the finance committee from 1951 to 1954. He advocated for small towns to develop their own talent in local leagues rather than importing players, and noted that hockey in rural Manitoba had continued to grow and compensated for poor attendance in Winnipeg.

The City of Winnipeg held a referendum during the civic elections on October 26, 1955, to decide whether to allow sports on a Sunday afternoon between 1:30pm and 6:00pm. Dunn was elected chairman of the Manitoba Sunday Sports Association which represented multiple local sporting organizations in favour games on Sundays. He argued that amateur sports were driven by gate receipts and felt that games on a Sunday "would be a God-send to local amateur sports". He felt that Sunday sports "would also counter juvenile delinquency [and] get the kids off the corners". The referendum was defeated by 147 votes after a recount and the issue referred back to the Winnipeg City Council for further discussion. Dunn hoped for another referendum and a longer campaign to convince more to vote in favour of Sunday sports.

=== Canadian Amateur Hockey Association ===
==== Second vice-president ====
Dunn served two one-year terms as the second vice-president of the CAHA beginning in June 1950, and was chairman of both the Allan Cup and Memorial Cup playoffs for Western Canada during 1951 and 1952. He was a member of the CAHA's committee to negotiate relations with the NHL, and helped reach an agreement to set a January deadline for the NHL to call up players from the Major Series of senior hockey and avoid a shortage of players during the Alexander Cup playoffs. He also voiced opposition to raising the age limit in junior hockey to 21 years old, since he did not want to give professional teams more control over junior-aged players without signing them to a contract.

==== First vice-president ====
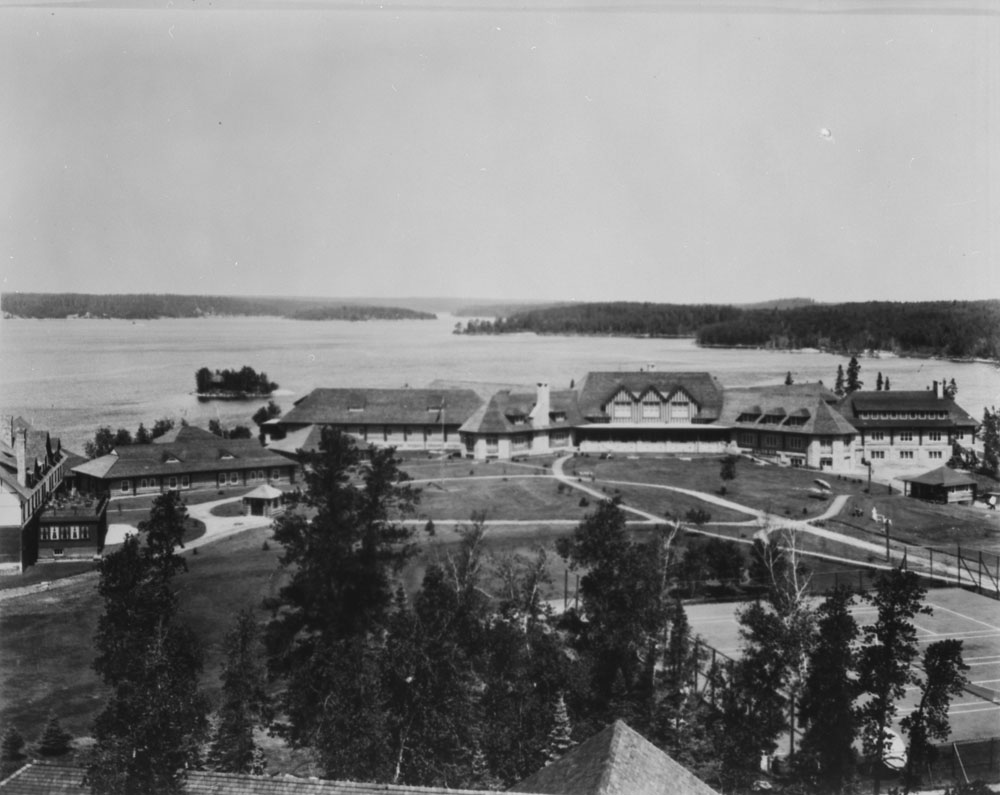
Minaki Lodge hosted the CAHA general meeting in 1952.

Dunn was elected first vice-president of the CAHA in June 1952, and served three one-year terms in the position. As chairman of the junior and senior playoffs in 1953, Dunn was faced with multiple branches of the CAHA not participating. He wanted to include as many teams as possible since the CAHA and all of its branches were primarily funded by gate receipts from the playoffs and could not afford the loss of income. The CAHA had suspended the Quebec Amateur Hockey Association for the season due to registration violations, and the Alberta Amateur Hockey Association chose to withdraw from senior hockey. Dunn went to extraordinary efforts to retain the Saskatchewan Amateur Hockey Association teams, which included rescheduling multiple series due to delays in the Saskatchewan playoffs and demands to play against the MAHA champion rather than the British Columbia Amateur Hockey Association champion.

The CAHA wanted to renegotiate its professional-amateur agreement with the NHL to have more say into the operation of amateur hockey and to regulate the signing of junior-aged players to contracts. Dunn sat on the negotiation committee and did not envision junior hockey in Canada being operated on a professional basis. The NHL wanted a better financial arrangement for the junior teams it sponsored, usage of the same rules of play in professional and amateur hockey, and to remove restrictions on the transfer of junior players between teams. The CAHA had placed a moratorium on transferring players to Eastern Canada as supported by Dunn, to prevent the loss of talent in Western Canada and to counteract Eastern Canadian teams dominating the Memorial Cup playoffs. In January 1954, a new financial agreement gave the junior teams sponsored by the NHL a greater proportionate share of playoffs profits, but Dunn and the CAHA continued to resist the movement of players to Eastern Canada and sought further discussion.

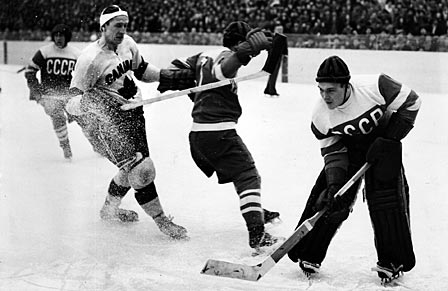
Canada versus the Soviet Union at the 1954 Ice Hockey World Championships

In 1952 and 1953, Dunn and the CAHA debated the financial merits of international tours by Canadian hockey teams and whether or not the tours created goodwill towards Canada. The CAHA chose not to participate at the 1953 World Championships since it struggled to finance the Canada men's national ice hockey team and because of persistent criticism by Europeans on the physical playing style of Canada. The CAHA settled on sending the senior B-level East York Lyndhursts as Canada's representative at the 1954 World Championships when it had become too expensive to fund a higher-level team for an international tour. The Lyndhursts lost by a 7–2 score to the Soviet Union men's national ice hockey team and placed second at the World Championships, which led to public dissatisfaction and widespread media criticism of the CAHA in Canada.

The CAHA chose Dunn as its representative to accompany the Kenora Thistles on an international goodwill exhibition tour of Japan in March 1954. Journalist Ted Bowles of the Winnipeg Free Press wrote that Dunn's selection to represent the CAHA "could be classed as a reward for his labours in the cause of sport for many years, especially the sport of hockey". On the seven-week tour, Dunn handled the business affairs for the Kenora Thistles and travelled with the team aboard the Japanese ocean liner Hikawa Maru from Vancouver.

Dunn had been expected to become CAHA president in May 1954, but was re-elected to the first vice-president position instead of the customary change of presidents every two years. He accepted the decision and since the second vice-president Wilfrid Duranceau had been ill for most of his two-year term, the CAHA opted to keep the same slate of officers for a third term instead of promoting Dunn to president and having an inexperienced first vice-president and newly elected second vice-president.

In August 1954, Dunn attended a meeting with junior hockey representatives from the five CAHA branches in Western Canada in addition to the Western Canada Junior Hockey League and the Saskatchewan Junior Hockey League (SJHL). Western Canada sought permission for any of its league champions to add three players during the inter-provincial playoffs for the Memorial Cup. They contended that the imbalance in competition compared to Eastern Canada teams had caused lack of spectator interest and less prestige for the event, and suggested that the Abbott Cup champion to have an additional three players added for the Memorial Cup final. The CAHA decided to allow the Abbott Cup champion to add three players from its own branch as of the 1955 Memorial Cup.

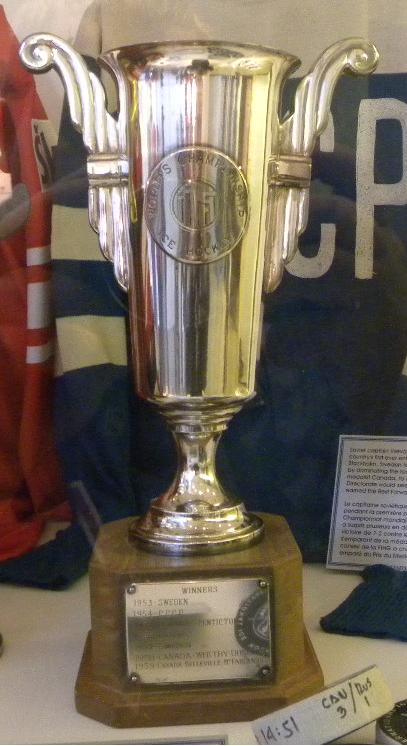
Ice Hockey World Championships trophy

At the semi-annual meeting in January 1955, the CAHA discussed cost-cutting measures when its budget was reduced from $70,000 to $55,000. Dunn extended another invitation to the Japan Ice Hockey Federation to send a team on an exhibition tour of Canada after a planned tour in 1955 failed due to lack of funding. The CAHA felt it had to send the most competitive team possible to the 1955 World Championships, and spared no expense in selecting the Penticton Vees since regaining the World Championships title was a matter of national pride. The CAHA lost $5,000 in sending the team to the 1955 World Championships, but Penticton regained the title for Canada with a 5–0 victory over the Soviet Union in the decisive game.

==== President ====
===== First term =====
The CAHA elected Dunn as president to succeed W. B. George on May 27, 1955. Dunn became the first Manitoban elected to the position since E. A. Gilroy in 1936, and assumed control of the CAHA at a time when it had lost the confidence of Canadians to produce a winning national team. The CAHA looked for private sponsorships to fund the national team, considered garnishing a greater portion of gate receipts for amateur games in Canada, and resolved to pay for the national team ice hockey at the 1956 Winter Olympics only as necessary. The Kitchener-Waterloo Dutchmen were chosen to represent Canada, and Dunn travelled with the team on their two-week European exhibition tour through Scotland and England on route to the Olympics in Cortina d'Ampezzo, Italy.

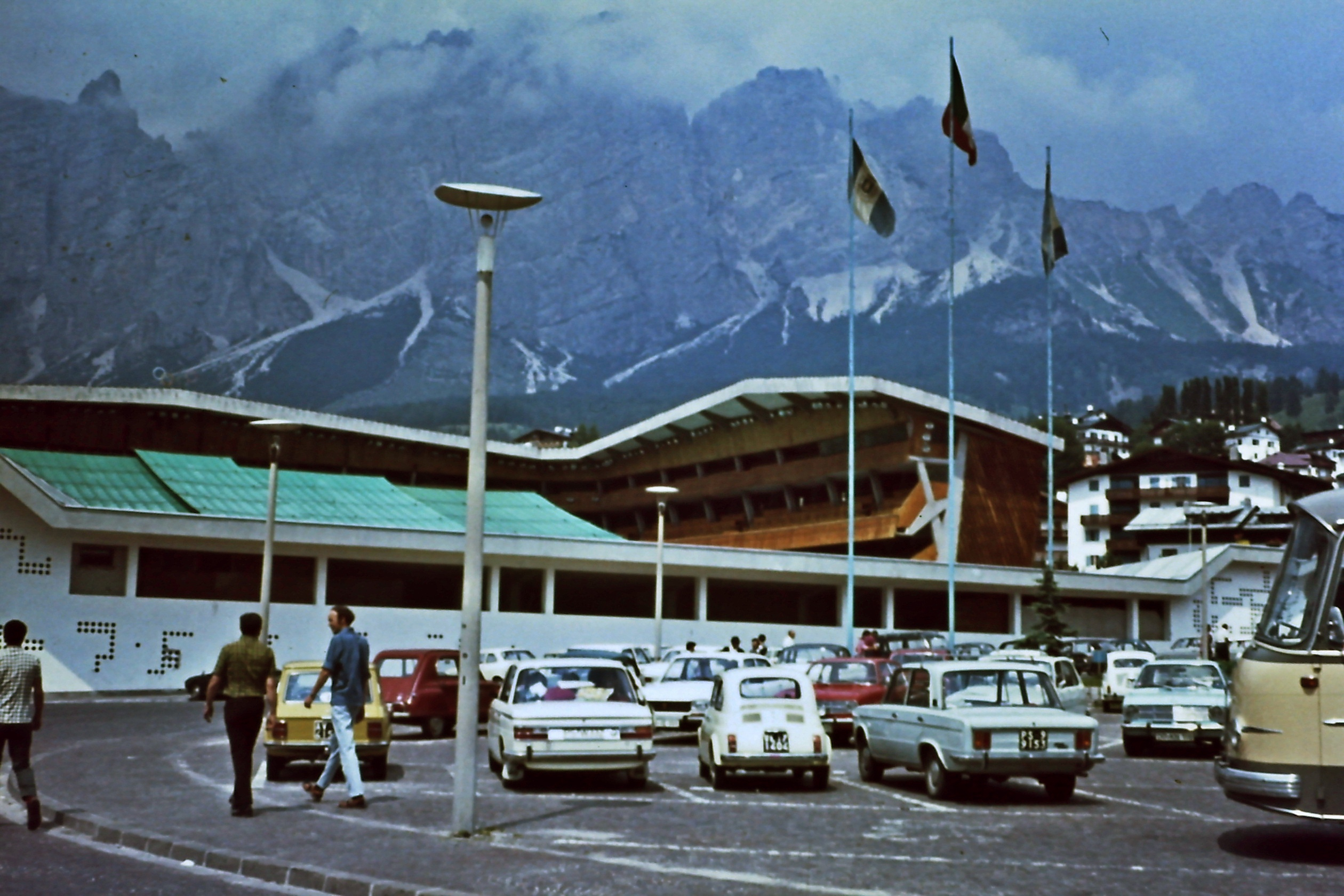
Olympic Ice Stadium in Cortina d'Ampezzo

During the Olympics, Dunn stated that the standard of officiating in Europe needed to improve and that it had been an ongoing issue anytime when Canada played. After a victory versus the Italy men's national ice hockey team where Canada was assessed 11 of the 15 penalties called, he protested against the future use of German referee Hans Unger and described the game as "one of the worst exhibitions of refereeing I have ever had the misfortune of seeing". Despite that Canada won the bronze medal with a third-place finish, Dunn praised the team and said "I am proud to say that although we were not successful in winning the Olympic title, the players and team executives were wonderful ambassadors for Canada at all times".

Dunn felt that Canada lost due to the Soviet Union's superior physical conditioning, skating abilities and textbook defending. He noted that the national teams from the Soviet Union and Czechoslovakia were operated by the state with the players individually selected. He recommended that Canada send a national all-star team to future international hockey events as did all other nations at the Olympics. He suggested that the reigning Allan Cup champion could be used as the nucleus to add the best players from across Canada, and that simply sending an intact senior hockey team was no longer good enough to win. He sought for the team to be a truly national effort supported by all since the CAHA could not finance the venture itself.

The CAHA and Dunn sought to negotiate a greater portion of the gate receipts from games played in Europe by the Canadian team. He felt that trips to Europe were too costly and did not create any goodwill for Canada, and stated that there was a "strong possibility" of Canada not attending future World Championships and only playing at the Olympic Games. At a special meeting of the International Ice Hockey Federation, he said that Canada would only attend the 1957 World Championships in Moscow if all expenses were guaranteed for the return trip to and from the Soviet Union since Canada was a major drawing card at games in Europe.

===== Second term =====
Dunn was re-elected president of the CAHA in May 1956. His recommendation for a national all-star team was approved, to be based on the nucleus of the 1956 Allan Cup champions Vernon Canadians for the 1957 World Championships. The CAHA sought financial backing from corporate sponsorships in addition to fundraising efforts pledged by supporters in Vernon, British Columbia. A committee was established to choose the best coaches, and CAHA teams all age groups from senior to junior were asked to nominate their best players for a one-month training camp prior to a North American exhibition tour. Despite the approval of the all-star team, the CAHA decided it would only send a team to the Olympics or World Championships if it did not have to pay all of the expenses due to budget constraints.

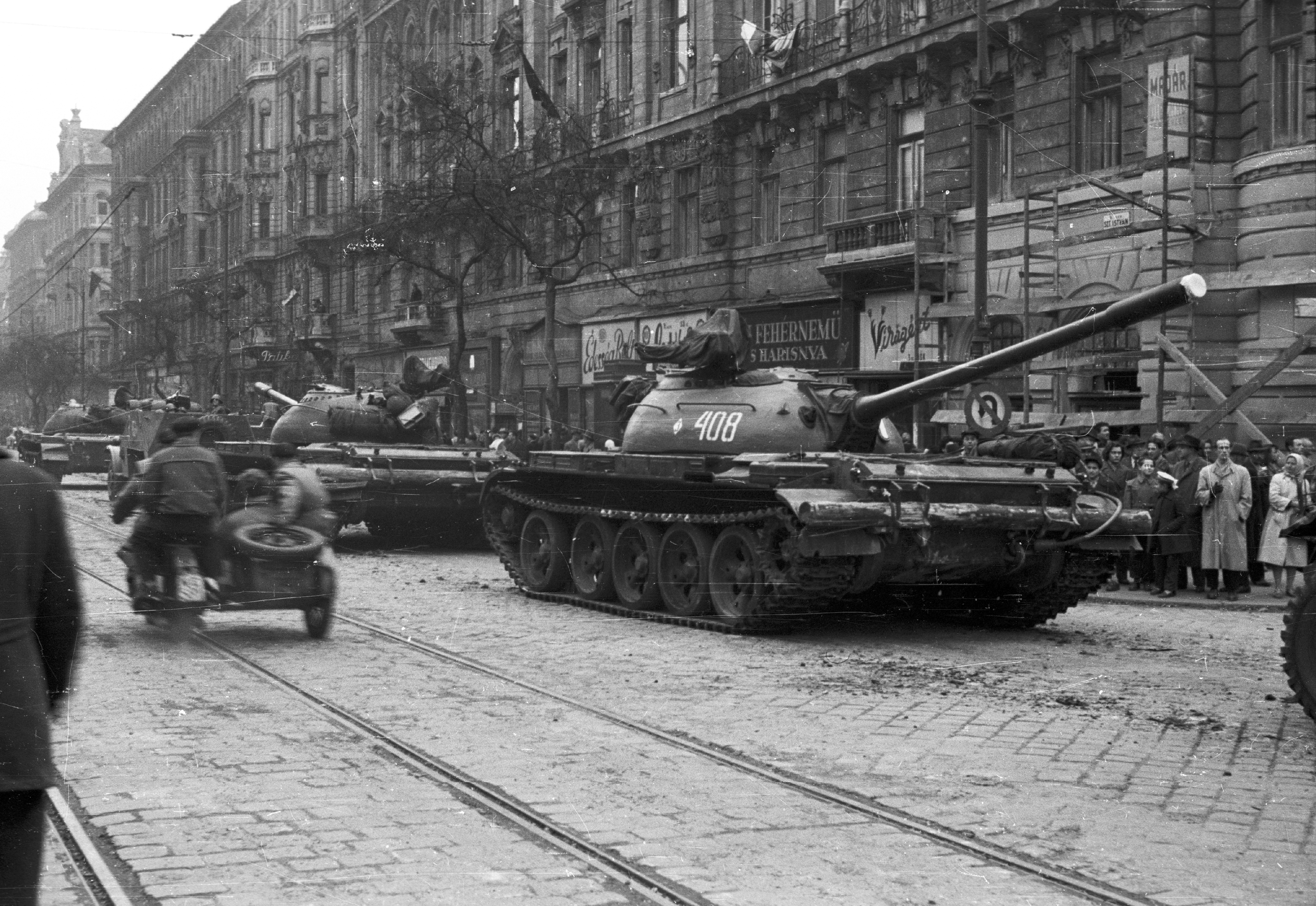
Soviet invasion of Hungary in October 1956

The CAHA executive met in November 1956 to discuss whether to continue with plans to raise the $75,000 required to send the Vernon Canadians to Moscow, or whether to send an intact senior team or no team at all. Dunn announced that the CAHA deemed the all-star team no longer feasible since it lacked organization and public support, and recommended that the Vernon Canadians and the Ottawa Junior Canadiens meet in a special series to decide Canada's representative. Later in November, Dunn and the CAHA abandoned plans to attend the 1957 World Championships when several Western Bloc countries agreed to boycott event in response to the 1956 Soviet invasion of Hungary.

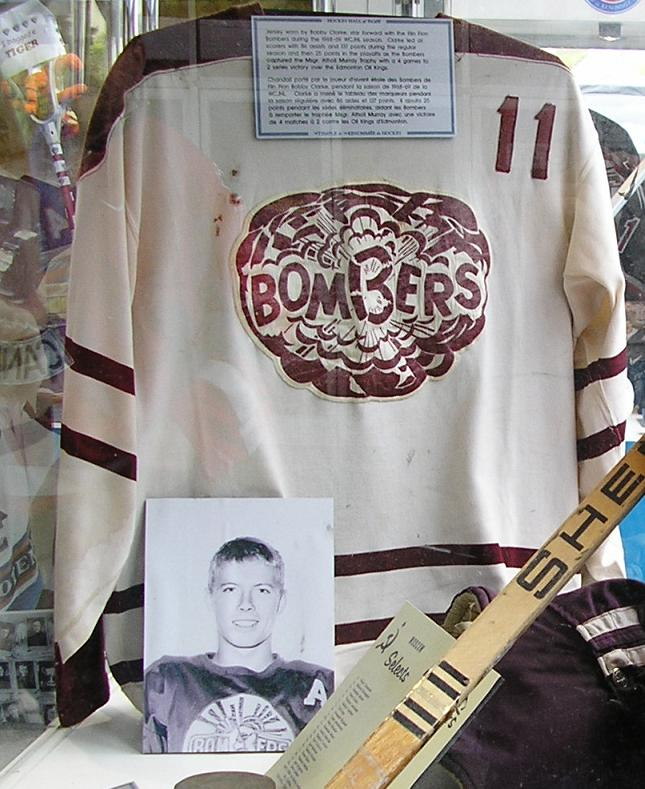
Flin Flon Bombers jersey c. 1967

Prior to the 1957 Memorial Cup playoffs, the MJHL requested permission for its champion to be allowed three additional players if the team reached the Abbot Cup final. When the request was approved by a vote of CAHA branch presidents, the Flin Flon Bombers and the SJHL objected despite a ruling by Dunn that the decision was made according to the constitution. The Winnipeg Tribune reported that the decision had "started the old country-city mud-slinging campaign". Flin Flon Daily Miner editor Harry Miles wrote that, "Jimmy Dunn in Winnipeg [was] shovelling new players into the Winnipeg junior club with reckless abandon", and implied that Winnipeg had long dominated amateur sports in Manitoba and that the decisions of various sports associations made it more difficult for Flin Flon to compete. When supporters of the Bombers hanged Dunn in effigy, he responded by saying "All I hope is that the effigy looked like me. I'd hate to think they had hanged somebody else by mistake".

At the 1957 general meeting, Dunn felt that relations with the NHL were the most important item on the agenda since the bodies had operated for two seasons without a written agreement. Discussions were held behind closed doors without a resolution finalized. The CAHA attempted to correct the imbalance in Memorial Cup competition and approved additional players for the weaker provincial champions during the national playoffs. Dunn continued to make plans for a Japanese team to visit Canada and named a CAHA committee to explore how to finance a proposed exhibition tour.

==== Past-president ====
Dunn was succeeded by Robert Lebel as president. Dunn was placed in charge of the senior and junior playoffs for Western Canada in 1959. He oversaw arrangements for the Japan men's national ice hockey team tour of Canada in January 1960, which included entertainment and luncheons during a four-day stopover in Winnipeg. He later represented the CAHA serving as a member of the Hockey Hall of Fame inductee selection committee from June 1961 until June 1976.

=== MJHL commissioner ===
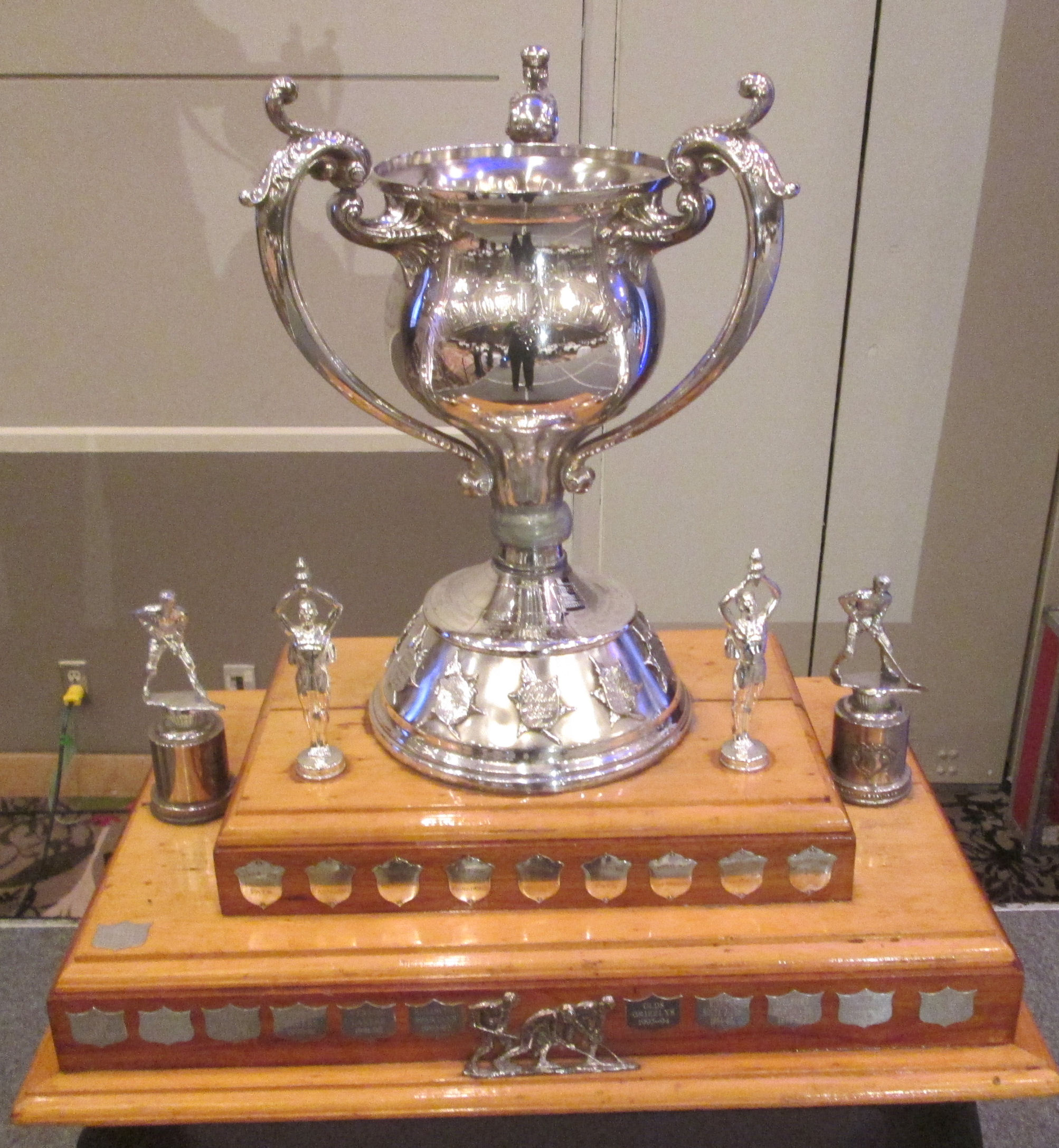
The Abbott Cup was the championship trophy for junior hockey in Western Canada overseen by the CAHA.

Dunn was hired as commissioner of the MJHL in May 1964. The league had been reduced to four teams based in the Greater Winnipeg area after the withdrawal of the Brandon Wheat Kings and the Fort Frances Royals. The MJHL transitioned from a draft of players in the Greater Winnipeg Minor Hockey Association, into a system where each team chose players from a set geographic district. The new "zoning" arrangement was planned to be in effect for three seasons to stimulate more localized interest in junior hockey and aimed to keep teammates together from the minor hockey level to the junior hockey level. Dunn supported the change and noted that the concept had produced forward lines on previous Memorial Cup championship teams from Winnipeg.

For the 1964–65 MJHL season, the Charlie Gardiner Memorial Trophy series was revived as a preseason tournament for the league's teams. Dunn reached an agreement to televise MJHL games on CJAY-TV, and the league experimented with playing games on Sunday evenings instead of afternoons to increase its attendance and avoid competing with televised football games. Dunn requested to the CAHA that the MJHL waive its bye into the Abbott Cup finals and its playoffs champion meet the Thunder Bay Junior A Hockey League champion in the first round. He felt that the loss of gate receipts from a bye was a financial hardship for the MJHL, and shorten the league's playoffs to accommodate the change approved by the CAHA.

For the 1965–66 MJHL season, Dunn implemented an automatic one-game minimum suspension for any player who received a match penalty. He felt that professional hockey influenced fisticuffs in junior hockey and said that, "Any time there's a big fight in the National Hockey League, the kids drop their sticks and put up their dukes in the next game. It happens almost every time".

The MJHL expanded from four to six teams for the 1966–67 MJHL season when it readmitted the Brandon Wheat Kings and accepted the Selkirk Steelers. Dunn announced his resignation as commissioner on October 24, 1966, and cited personal reasons. Despite being offered a pay raise, he felt that the increase in teams made the job too much for him and had "taken the fun out of it". His resignation came shortly after a game between the Winnipeg Rangers and the Brandon Wheat Kings in which 242 penalty minutes were given in the first period.

=== Later hockey career ===
Dunn was the commissioner of both the 1967 Canadian Centennial tournament hosted in Winnipeg, and the Manitoba Senior Hockey League for the 1967–68 season. From 1968 to 1972, he was one of four citizen members who sat on the board of directors of the Winnipeg Enterprises Corporation which oversaw the operation and management of sports stadiums in Winnipeg. For the 1970–71 season, he was appointed by the MJHL to a committee for handling appeals to regulations and constitutional matters.

When the 1970 World Championships were scheduled to be hosted in Winnipeg, Dunn sat on the ticket sales committee and travelled to the 1969 World Championships in Stockholm as part of a sales campaign. He later stated that the biggest disappointment of his hockey career was Winnipeg's loss of hosting the World Championships when the Canadian national team withdrew from international play in 1970.

In 1967, the Manitoba Old Timers' Association named Dunn to a committee to establish a benevolent association for Manitoba's hockey players and a hall of fame for hockey in Manitoba; and to provide more places to play hockey, and social, educational and coaching benefits. The Manitoba Hockey Players' Foundation was established in September 1968, and Dunn volunteered for eight years as its secretary-treasurer until 1975. The new foundation assumed control of the annual hockey-golf tournament which Dunn had co-founded with Johnny Petersen in 1937. Dunn assisted in co-ordinating annual fundraising dinners for the foundation, and helped arrange exhibition games for Manitoba's professional all-stars versus the Canadian national team. In 1972, he arranged and travelled with a team of NHL old-timers from Manitoba on a European exhibition tour.

== Baseball career ==
=== Greater Winnipeg leagues ===
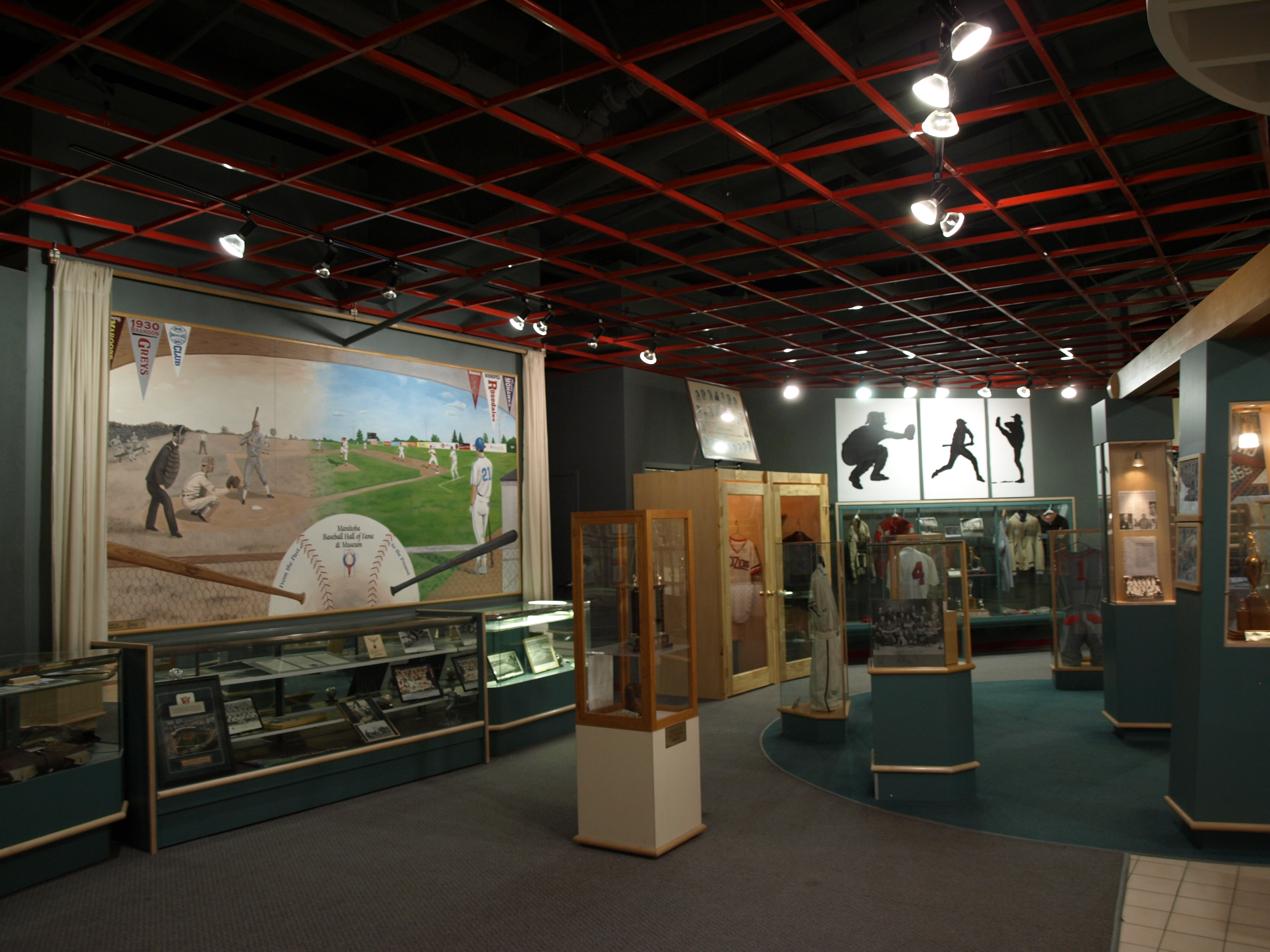
Manitoba Baseball Hall of Fame exhibits

In 1928, Dunn became president of the Uneeda Club in Winnipeg and was involved with its amateur baseball teams for seven years. He managed the team for two seasons which saw regular attendance between 4,000 and 5,000 spectators per game at Wesley Park. The Uneeda Club reached the league's championship finals in 1929, and played in an international tournament in Minneapolis. In an interview in 1954, Dunn stated that he probably gave up the longest home run hit while pitching at Wesley Park.

Dunn was elected to the executive of the Manitoba Diamond Ball Association in 1934. The Greater Winnipeg Senior Baseball League elected him its second vice-president in 1936, and then its vice-president in 1941. He served as president of the league from May 1942, until he resigned in April 1946. The Western Canada Baseball Association was founded in September 1945 to govern senior and junior baseball in Western Canada, then immediately named Dunn its first vice-president, and welcomed the Greater Winnipeg Senior Baseball League into its membership in the 1946 season.

During World War II, Dunn represented baseball in Winnipeg on the Athletic Patriotic Association which sought to donate sporting equipment to servicemen in the Canadian Armed Forces. After resigning as a league executive, he was a regular behind the microphone at Osborne Stadium and entertained spectators during baseball games. Winnipeg Free Press journalist Harvey Dryden described his style by writing that, "Dunn's quips are very sharp indeed and keep the crowd in good humour".

=== Manitoba and Dakota leagues ===
Dunn was elected the first president the newly established Manitoba Senior Baseball League in May 1948, which returned an independent baseball league to Manitoba since the Winnipeg Maroons of the Northern League folded in 1942. The new league included three teams in Winnipeg and one in Brandon, Manitoba, but plans for a team based in Grand Forks, North Dakota were not realized. Dunn was re-elected president in 1949, and continued negotiations for a team in Grand Forks in addition to the four returning teams. When negotiations failed, an entry from Carman, Manitoba, was admitted as the fifth team in the league.

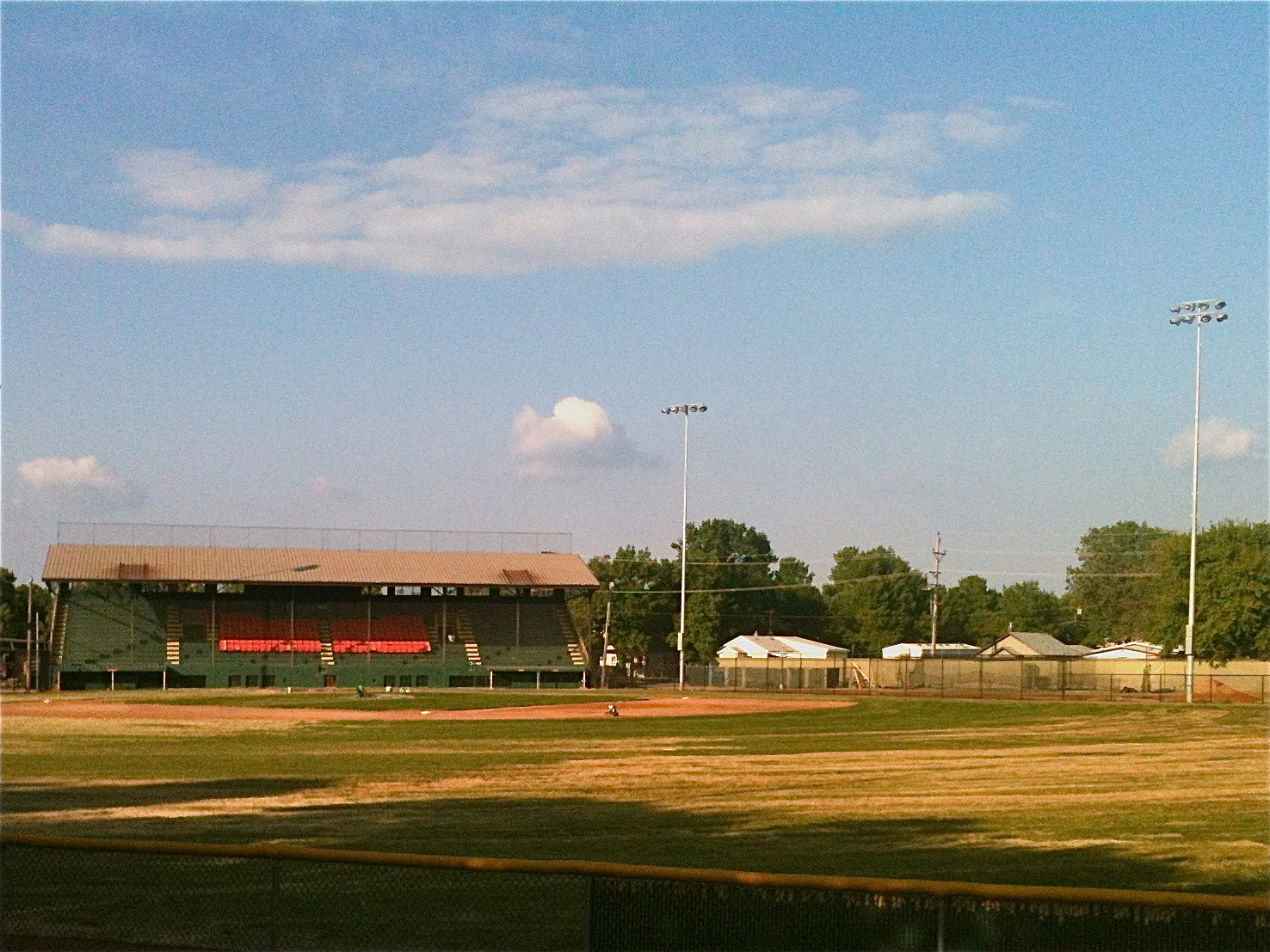
Corbett Field was the home stadium of the Minot Mallards.

In January 1950, the Manitoba Senior Baseball League added a team from Minot, North Dakota, and was reorganized into the Mandak League with Dunn elected as president for the season. The league drafted a new constitution, decided that its teams would wear a patch including both the flags of Canada and the United States, and planned a parade with a marching band through downtown Winnipeg on its opening day. Dunn described the opening day plans by saying that, "the Mandak baseball league this year will be more colourful than a Scotman's kilt".

Opening day was postponed due to the 1950 Red River flood inundating Osborne Stadium, and the schedule was changed for the Winnipeg teams begin on the road. Dunn and the league arranged several benefit games to raise money for local charities. Dunn planned a league all-star game in mid-June as a fundraiser for Winnipeg's Flood Fund, with the players picked by the Winnipeg Free Press and The Winnipeg Tribune.

In July 1950, Dunn stated that the Mandak League planned to speak with Major League Baseball commissioner Happy Chandler about joining the professional baseball structure for the following season. The Winnipeg Free Press expressed concerns that the Korean War could negatively affect the league, but also that the popularity of the Mandak League had led to decreased attendance for women's softball in Manitoba.

After the season, team executives lauded Dunn for his leadership of the league despite that only one of the five teams made a profit. He was unanimously re-elected as president and the league assumed the control of scheduling umpires instead of the home teams doing so. The league's schedule was increased from 48 to 64 games with the hope that more games would make the season profitable. Dunn resigned as Mandak League president at the conclusion of the 1951 season.

== Softball career ==
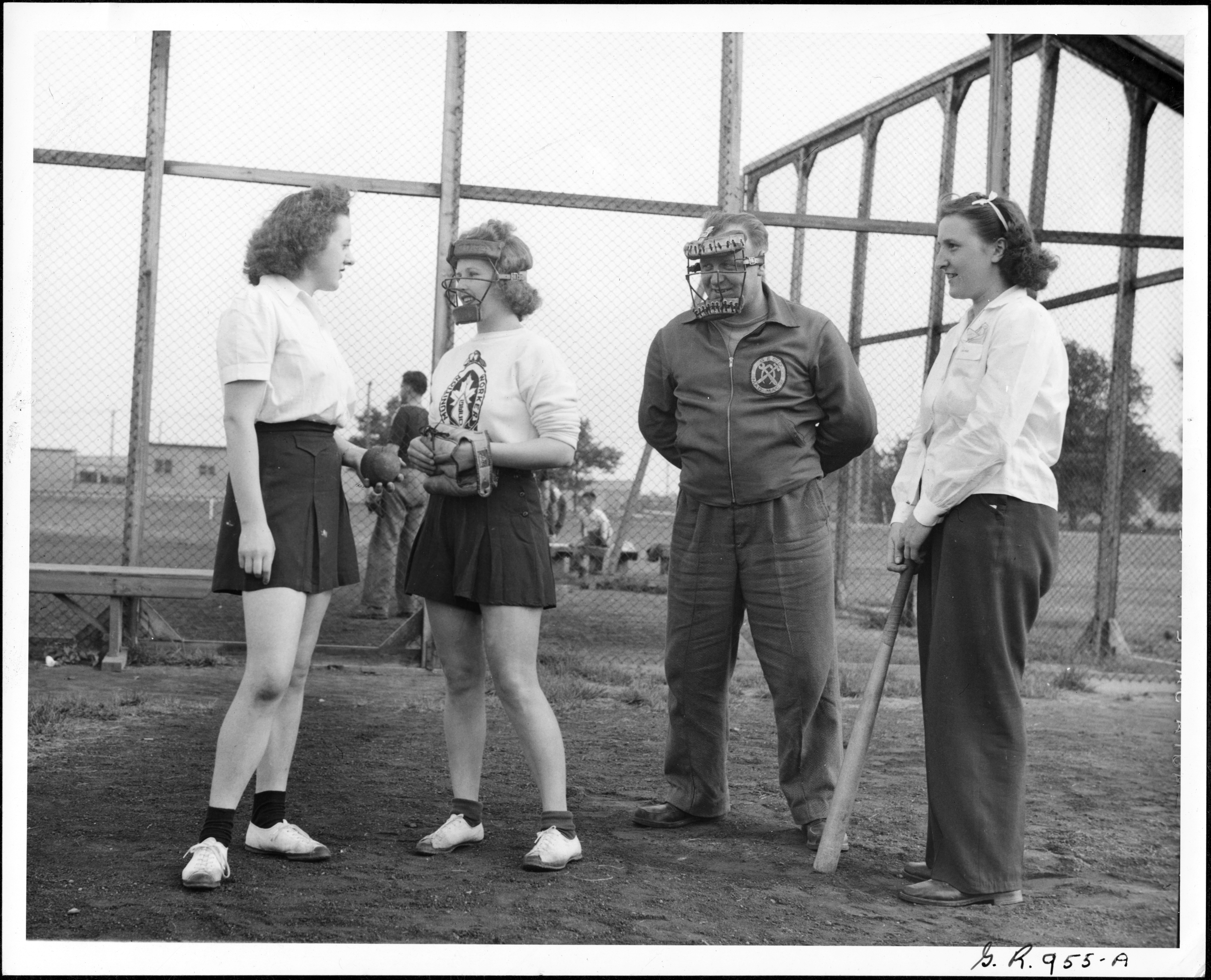
Women playing softball c. 1943

Dunn served as president of the Greater Winnipeg Senior Girls' Softball League from 1941 to 1946. He oversaw girls' fastpitch softball games at Osborne Stadium, and operated the league with four or five teams playing each season. He convinced owners of the teams to continue on with playing the 1942 season despite the economic struggles during the World War II, but withdrew the league from the Western Canada playoffs that season since paying the travel costs was not feasible. The league had recovered by the 1944 season which Dunn felt was the most successful yet in terms of talent and finances, then renamed itself to the Greater Winnipeg Girls' Fastball League as of the 1945 season.

Dunn led efforts to establish a provincial governing body for men's and women's fastpitch softball, and became the founding president of the Manitoba Fastball Association in April 1946. He laid out plans for a constitution and the provincial playoffs, and sought to increase participation in the game from the rural areas of Manitoba. As a delegate to the Western Canada Fastball Association, he assisted in enacting uniform playing rules for men and women, and convinced the association to award hosting duties of the 1947 women's Western Canada championship to Winnipeg. After one season as president, he retired from the Manitoba Fastball Association in 1947.

== Athletics and football career ==
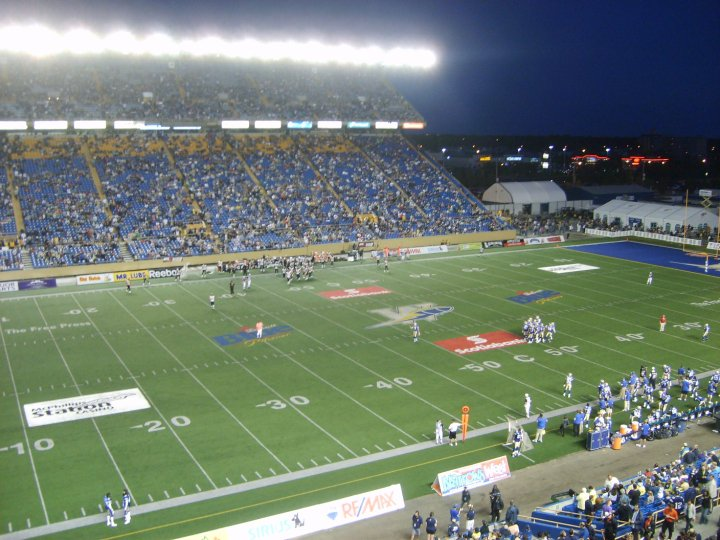
A Winnipeg Blue Bombers home game

Dunn served as secretary of the Manitoba branch of the Amateur Athletic Union of Canada (AAU of C) from 1930 until succeeded by Sydney Halter in 1932. Dunn later served on the board of governors for the Manitoba branch of the AAU of C from 1935 to 1942, and sat on the executive committee of the Winnipeg Athletic Association for two years beginning in 1936. He was named to the track and field record keeping committee of the Manitoba branch of the AAU of C in 1937, and to the national record keeping committee of the AAU of C in 1939. From 1931 until 1942, he served as a timekeeper at wrestling and boxing events, and was an on-field official and a public address announcer at provincial track and field events.

Dunn began working regularly as a timekeeper for high school football games in Winnipeg in 1926, and later did the same job with the Manitoba Rugby Football Union. He was the original timekeeper of the Winnipeg Blue Bombers when the team was founded in 1930, and never missed a home game until he retired before the 1972 season. The Winnipeg Tribune journalist Vince Leah wrote that, "if [Dunn] had a dime for every football and hockey game he has timed in the past 40 years he could buy the Arena". The Winnipeg Tribune reported that during a Blue Bombers home game on October 20, 1956, Dunn fired his timekeeper's pistol for the end of a quarter and killed two birds with one shot when a spectator threw a dead duck onto the field at the same time.

== Curling career ==
Dunn was the skip of a curling rink within the Transcona and Fort Rouge CN Curling League. He also curled with the Fidelity Masonic Lodge, and regularly at the Thistle Curling Club in Winnipeg. As of 1941, Dunn was an executive in the CN league and the Masonic Curling Club.

The Thistle Curling Club elected Dunn its second vice-president for the 1960–61 season, and its first vice-president for the 1961–62 season, when the club sought to build a new six-sheet rink in the West End neighbourhood. He served as president of the Winnipeg Thistle Curling Club during the 1962–63 season and co-ordinated its 75th anniversary celebration at the Fort Garry Hotel. He also served on the Manitoba Curling Association executive council during the same season.

== Personal life ==
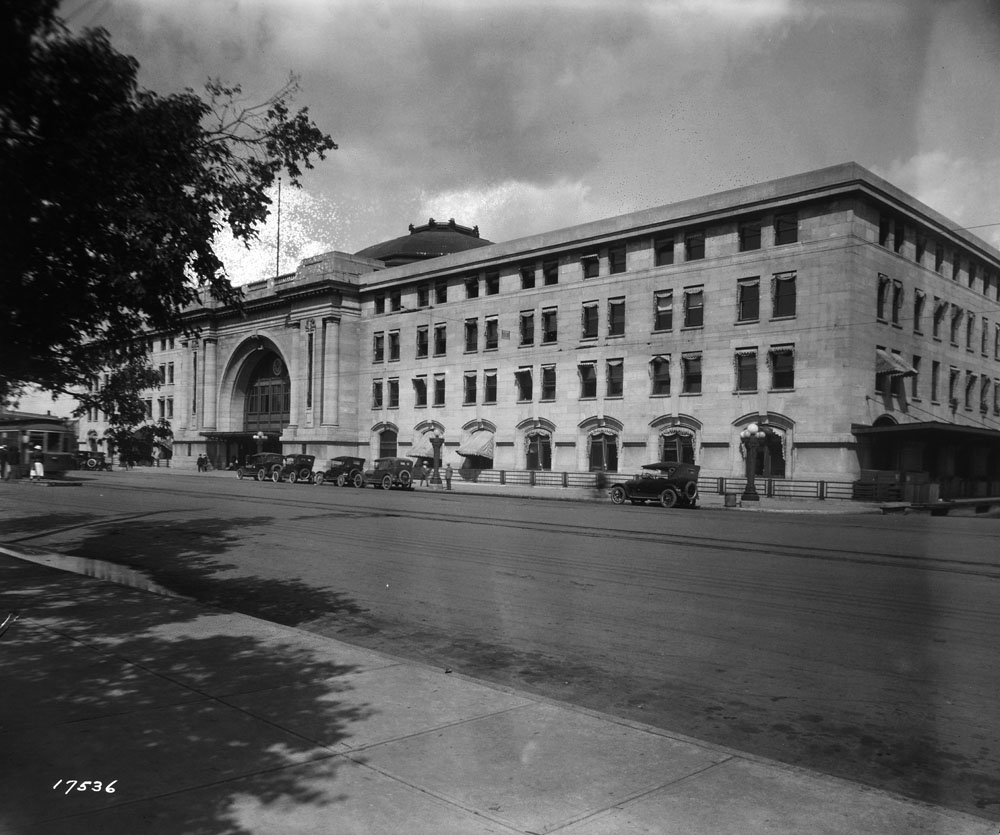
Union Station, CN headquarters in Winnipeg

After World War I, Dunn played basketball with the YMCA Argonauts in Winnipeg, and won a couple of trophies played golf. He later participated in the CN five-pin bowling league, and once had the highest individual men's score for a season at 327.

Dunn was married to Mary Dunn (née Armitage). She was a former university athlete who served as president of the Manitoba branch of the Women's Amateur Athletic Federation of Canada and the Dominion Women's Amateur Hockey Association. They had one child together, a son named Gary born in 1936. Dunn coached his son on a team of nine-year-olds at the West End Athletic Club c. 1945.

In February 1944, Dunn accepted a Canadian Army Reserve commission as the commanding officer of the Fort Garry Horse Cadet Corps. He formed a softball team for the horse cadets and coached them in the local Army Cadets' Softball League. He was a charter member of the Royal Canadian Legion in Fort Rouge and was a member of the Fidelity Masonic Lodge No. 145.

The Dunns maintained a summer cottage in Sandy Hook, Manitoba, and he served as a treasurer of the Sandy Hook Community Club.

Dunn retired from CN in February 1963 after 43 years of service. He had been promoted to chief clerk at the Fort Rouge Yards in 1941, then became the chief clerk at the CN motive power and car department office at the Transcona Yard in 1960.

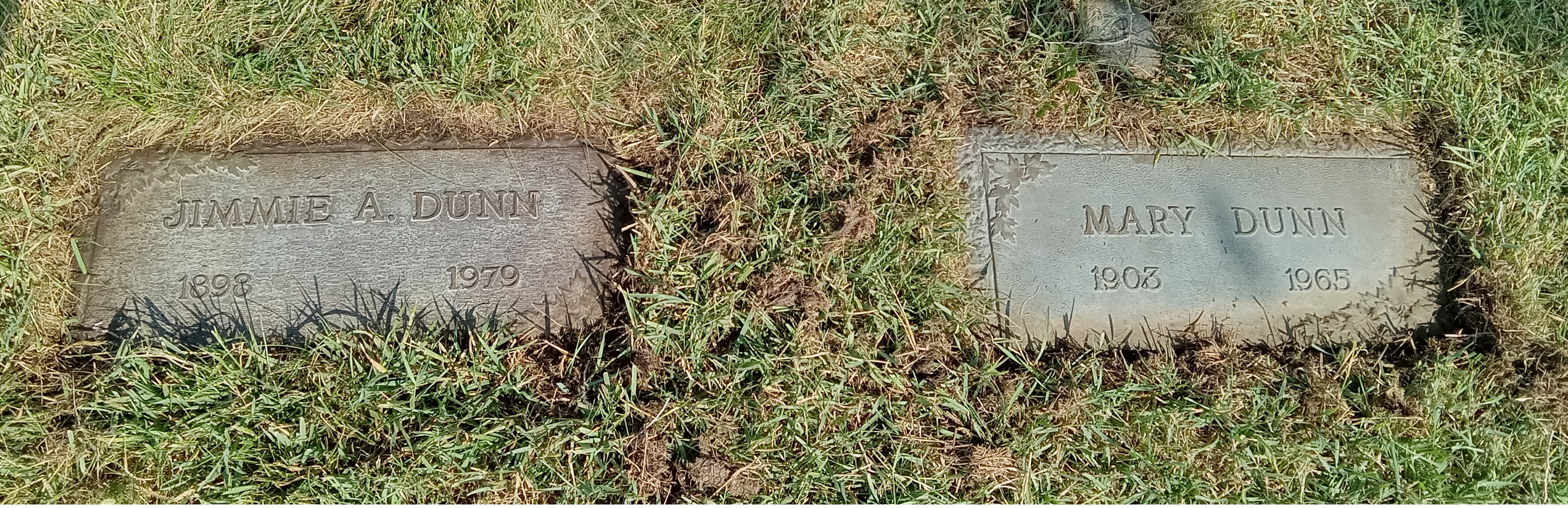
Dunn's grave marker

Mary Dunn died at age 61 on January 10, 1965. He died at age 80 on January 7, 1979, at the Health Sciences Centre in Winnipeg. He was interred with his wife in Garry Memorial Park in Winnipeg – later known as Thomson in the Park Cemetery.

== Honours and legacy ==
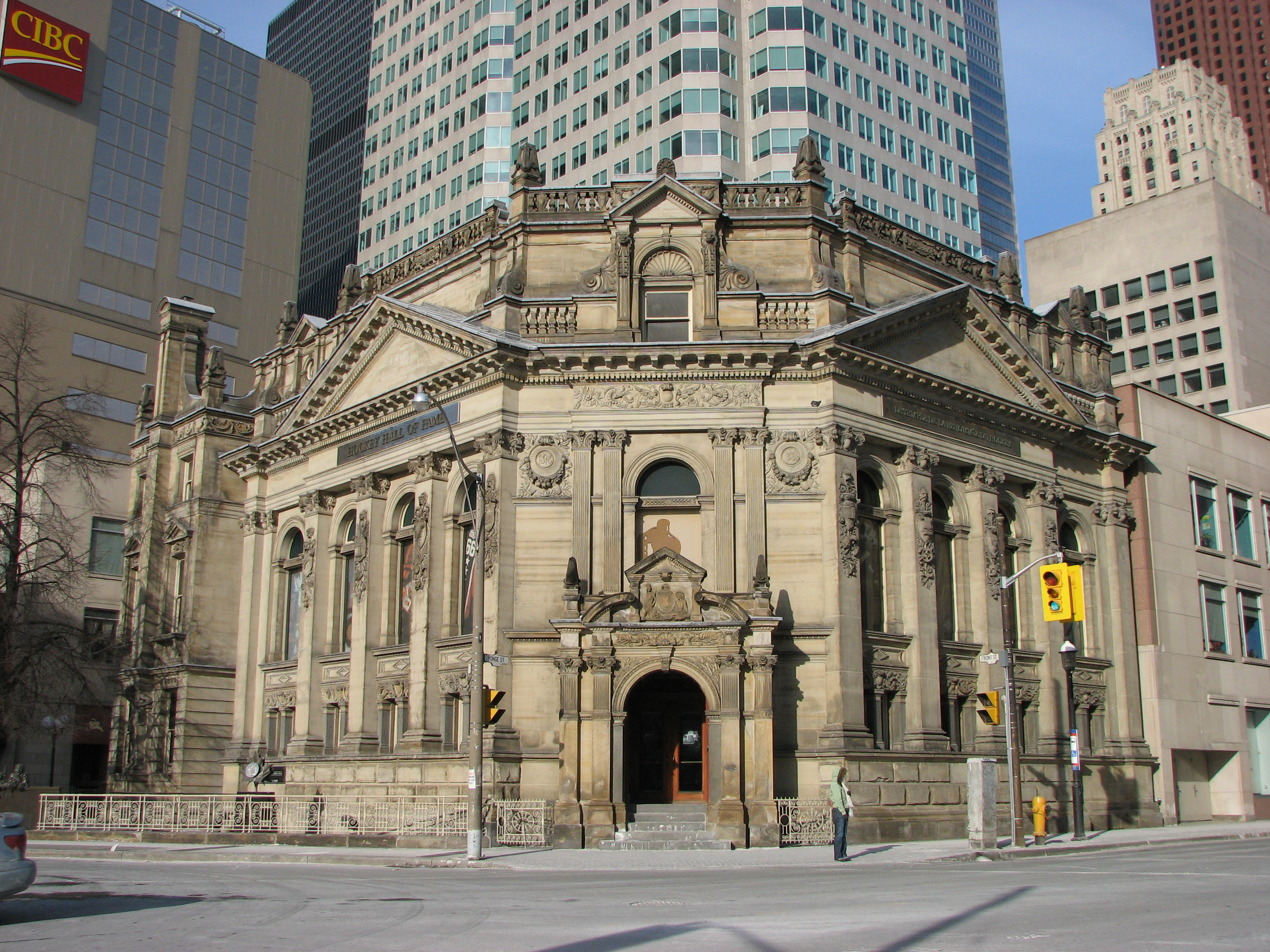
Hockey Hall of Fame building

Dunn was known as "Mr. Hockey" in Winnipeg and Manitoba. Ted Bowles wrote in the Winnipeg Free Press that, "Dunn had a thankless job and had always worked in the best interest of hockey, and tried to please as many people as possible", and The Winnipeg Tribune sports editor Jack Matheson wrote that "no single individual in Manitoba has made a more significant contribution to sport". Vince Leah of The Winnipeg Tribune credited Dunn for "seeing the job is done right", and his leadership assured the success of any sport organization. Leah also wrote that, "When you mention the name "Dunn" you automatically think of Jimmy Dunn, who has been around the local sports scene for so long there is a grave suspicion he invented it"; but felt that both Dunn and his wife deserved recognition for "tremendous contributions to sport in Winnipeg".

The Greater Winnipeg Senior Girls Softball League bestowed a life membership on Dunn in 1947. He received the Amateur Hockey Association of the United States citation award in 1956, in recognition of his contributions to ice hockey internationally and in the United States. He was made a life member of the CAHA in May 1974, and was the first person to be appointed a life member of the Manitoba Hockey Players' Foundation when the honour was established in 1975. He was made an honorary president of the MAHA in June 1975, and received past-president's rings from both the CAHA and the MAHA.

Dunn was elected to the builder category of the Hockey Hall of Fame on June 12, 1968, and was formally inducted during a ceremony at Exhibition Place in Toronto on August 25, 1968. He was the guest of honour at a testimonial dinner on October 29, 1970, which included more than 400 guests from the various sports he had been involved with. Winnipeg City Council honoured him in 1976 with a 50-year service plaque for local sports. He was posthumously inducted into the builder category of the Manitoba Hockey Hall of Fame in 1985.
