= Whitehorse Huskies =

Ice hockey team from Yukon, Canada

- City: Whitehorse, Yukon
- League: Independent
- Founded: 1992
- Home arena: Takhini Arena
- Colours: Green, Gray, and White
- General manager: Dan Johnson
- Head coach: Michael Tuton

The Whitehorse Huskies are a Senior "AAA" ice hockey team that is based in Whitehorse, Yukon, Canada. They are one-time Allan Cup National Champions.

== History ==
In 1993 the Whitehorse Huskies won the Allan Cup by defeating the Quesnel Kangaroos in the Final. After taking the coveted Allan Cup back to the Yukon, the team hung up their skates. The Huskies are the only teams from the Yukon, Northwest Territories, or Nunavut to have ever won the Allan Cup.

In 2009, after a 16-year hiatus, Hockey Canada approved the revival of the Huskies, and the team was subsequently sanctioned by the British Columbia Amateur Hockey Association to compete during the 2009-10 season. The current edition of the Triple A men's hockey team, coached by Dan Johnson, plays its home games at the Takhini Arena.

In the 2009-10 playoffs, the Huskies were eliminated from 2010 Allan Cup contention when they were swept 3-games-to-none by the Powell River Regals in the Pacific finals.

The franchise played in the AAA level league through the 2013-14 season, after which they moved to the AA level for 2014-15, playing in the BC Senior Hockey League. They went on to win the Coy Cup Championship in 2016, but could not find enough players for the 2016-17 season, and had to withdraw from competition as a result.

== Takhini Arena ==
Takhini Arena
- Location: 345 Range Road
- Owner: City of Whitehorse
- Capacity: 1,535

Construction
- Opened: 1984

Tenant
- Whitehorse Huskies (various times since 1992)

Takhini Arena is the home of the Huskies. It opened in 1984 and currently seats 1,535. The arena hosted hockey and ringette in the 2007 Canada Winter Games.
