= 1993 Allan Cup =

Canadian senior ice hockey championship

The Allan Cup trophy

The 1993 Allan Cup was the Canadian senior ice hockey championship for the 1992–93 senior "AAA" season. The event was hosted by the Quesnel Kangaroos in Quesnel, British Columbia. The 1993 tournament marked the 85th time that the Allan Cup has been awarded.

The 1993 Allan Cup was an absolute rarity, as for the first time a team from the Yukon Territory won the Allan Cup. Absent from the tournament were any teams from Eastern Canada.

== Teams ==
- Quesnel Kangaroos (Host)
- Stony Plain Eagles
- Warroad Lakers
- Whitehorse Huskies

== Results ==
Round Robin

Whitehorse Huskies 5 - Stony Plain Eagles 4
Warroad Lakers 9 - Quesnel Kangaroos 6
Stony Plain Eagles 6 - Warroad Lakers 5
Whitehorse Huskies 6 - Quesnel Kangaroos 2
Whitehorse Huskies 8 - Warroad Lakers 8
Quesnel Kangaroos 7 - Stony Plain Eagles 4

Semi-final

Quesnel Kangaroos 9 - Warroad Lakers 6

Final

Whitehorse Huskies 7 - Quesnel Kangaroos 4
