= Quesnel Kangaroos =

Senior ice hockey team

- City: Quesnel, British Columbia
- League: Central Interior Hockey League
- Division: East
- Home arena: West Fraser Centre
- Colours
- Head coach: Harley Gilks
- Website: quesnelkangaroos.ca

The Quesnel Kangaroos are a senior ice hockey team in the Central Interior Hockey League (CIHL) based in Quesnel, British Columbia that played as an Intermediate team at least as far back as 1965. In 1979, they became a member of the now-defunct British Columbia Senior Hockey League (BCSHL). After the demise of the BCSHL (after just two seasons), the Kangaroos continued on as either an independent Senior or Intermediate club. In 1993 the team played in the Allan Cup final but lost to the Whitehorse Huskies in the final game.

The team was named the Millionaires Hockey Team before being renamed the Kangaroos in 1947 when new uniforms were purchased in Australia.

== Awards ==
=== Allan Cup (Canadian Senior Championship) ===
- 1993: Hosted
- 1993: Lost final

=== Hardy Cup (Canadian Intermediate Championship) ===
- 1979: Lost Finals
- 1982: Lost Finals
- 1988: Lost Finals

=== Edmonton Journal Trophy (Western Canada Intermediate Championship) ===
- 1979: Won
- 1982: Won
- 1988: Won

=== Coy Cup (British Columbia Intermediate Champions) ===
- 1966: Won
- 1968: Won
- 1979: Won
- 1982: Won
- 1988: Won

== See also ==
- Allan Cup
- Coy Cup
- Hardy Cup
- Central Interior Hockey League
- Cariboo Hockey League

== Sources ==
- Kelly, Austin (26 August 2024). "Artist calls out Quesnel Kangaroos' complicated path to new logo". Quesnel Cariboo Observer. Black Press Media. Archived from the original on 18 September 2024.
- "History - Quesnel Kangaroos". quesnelkangaroos.ca.
- Kelly, Austin (25 October 2024). "Quesnel Kangaroos' Tomassetti smashes CIHL record". Williams Lake Tribune. Black Press Media.
- McMillan, Rob (26 January 2024). "LETTER: Junior hockey dream for Quesnel possibly dashed by local gov". Quesnel Cariboo Observer. Black Press Media. Archived from the original on 17 September 2024.
- "LETTER: Quesnel Kangaroos support idea of Junior hockey, but only if paid $100k". Quesnel Cariboo Observer. Black Press Media. 29 January 2024. Archived from the original on 10 September 2024.
- Henderson, George (29 January 2024). "Quesnel Kangaroos clear the air over junior hockey proposal". My Cariboo Now. Archived from the original on 31 January 2024.
- Peebles, Frank (31 January 2024). "Financial guarantee is a shot way wide of the Quesnel net: KIJHL". Quesnel Cariboo Observer. Black Press Media. Archived from the original on 3 February 2024.
- Henderson, George (13 February 2024). "Quesnel is one step closer to getting a junior hockey team". My Cariboo Now. Archived from the original on 15 February 2024.
- Kelly, Austin (8 October 2024). "Quesnel Kangaroos take massive win at home opener". Quesnel Cariboo Observer. Black Press Media. Archived from the original on 9 October 2024.

As of this edit, this article uses content from "Quesnel Kangaroos", which is licensed in a way that permits reuse under the Creative Commons Attribution-ShareAlike 3.0 Unported License, but not under the GFDL. All relevant terms must be followed.
