= Coy Cup =

Senior ice hockey trophy

- Sport: Ice hockey
- Awarded for: Regional championship
- Country: Canada
- Presented by: BC Hockey

History
- First award: 1923
- First winner: Enderby Hockey Club
- Most recent: Dawson Creek Canucks (2026)

The Coy Cup is awarded to the Senior AA ice hockey champions of British Columbia. Teams from the Yukon have also competed. It is awarded annually to the winners of a round-robin tournament between the champions of the Central Interior Hockey League (CIHL), the champions of the North Peace Hockey League (NPHL), a qualifier from another part of British Columbia or the Yukon, and the designated host city team.

== History ==
The trophy was donated to the British Columbia Amateur Hockey Association by Colonel Coy of the 50th Gordon Highlanders (now the 16th Scottish) of Victoria, British Columbia. The Coy Cup was first awarded to the Enderby Hockey Club in the 1922–23 season.

The Coy Cup is the Senior AA championship of British Columbia, formerly known as Senior B until 1983. The winner of the Coy Cup for some time competed for the now-defunct Hardy Cup National Championship.

In 2017, the Whitehorse Huskies became the first team from outside BC to win the Coy Cup.

== Champions ==
- 1922–23 - Enderby Hockey Club
- 1924–25 - Ex-King George Hockey Club
- 1926–27 - Prince George Hockey Club
- 1927–28 - Vernon
- 1928–29 - Vernon Hockey Club
- 1929–30 - Vernon Hockey Club
- 1930–31 - Lumby Flying Frenchmen
- 1931–32 - Vernon and Prince George, jointly
- 1932–33 - Kimberley Hockey Club
- 1933–34 - Vernon
- 1934–35 - Vernon
- 1935–36 - Merritt Hockey Club
- 1936–37 - Pioneer Mines Hockey Club
- 1937–38 - Bralorne Golddiggers
- 1938–39 - Bralorne Golddiggers
- 1939–40 - No Competition
- 1940–41 - Nanaimo Clippers
- 1941–42 - Nanaimo Clippers
- 1942–43 - Vernon Hockey Club
- 1943–44 - Vernon Legionnaires
- 1944–45 - No Competition
- 1945–46 - Vernon
- 1946–47 - Trail All-Stars
- 1947–48 - New Westminster Hillsides
- 1948–49 - Nanaimo Clippers
- 1949–50 - Trail All-Stars
- 1950–51 - Trail Smoke Eaters
- 1951–52 - Kamloops Loggers
- 1952–53 - Trail All-Stars
- 1953–54 - Trail All-Stars
- 1954–55 - Trail All-Stars
- 1955–56 - Nanaimo Clippers
- 1956–57 - Kimberley Dynamiters
- 1957–58 - Nanaimo Clippers
- 1958–59 - Vancouver Carlings
- 1959–60 - Nanaimo Labatts
- 1960–61 - Trail Oilers
- 1961–62 - Summerland Macs
- 1962–63 - Kamloops Chiefs
- 1963–64 - Kamloops Chiefs
- 1964–65 - Vernon Luckies
- 1965–66 - Quesnel Kangaroos
- 1966–67 - Powell River Regals
- 1967–68 - Quesnel Kangaroos
- 1968–69 - Powell River Regals
- 1969–70 - Powell River Regals (National champions)
- 1970–71 - Prince George Mohawks
- 1971–72 - Shmyr Flyers
- 1972–73 - Prince George Mohawks
- 1973–74 - Coquitlam Canadians
- 1974–75 - Prince George Mohawks
- 1975–76 - Prince George Mohawks
- 1976–77 - North Shore Hurry Kings
- 1977–78 - Prince George Mohawks (National champions)
- 1978–79 - North Shore Hurry Kings
- 1979–80 - Burnaby Lakers (National champions)
- 1980–81 - Victoria Athletics
- 1981–82 - Quesnel Kangaroos
- 1982–83 - Quesnel Kangaroos
- 1983–84 - Quesnel Kangaroos
- 1984–85 - Quesnel Kangaroos
- 1985–86 - Quesnel Kangaroos
- 1986–87 - Quesnel Kangaroos
- 1987–88 - Quesnel Kangaroos
- 1988–89 - Abbotsford Blues
- 1989–90 - Quesnel Kangaroos
- 1990–91 - Revelstoke Merchants
- 1991–92 - Penticton Silver Bullets
- 1992–93 - Powell River Regals
- 1993–94 - Sicamous Eagles
- 1994–95 - No Competition
- 1995–96 - New Westminster Beavers
- 1996–97 - Fort St. James Stars
- 1997–98 - Quesnel Kangaroos
- 1998–99 - Ft. St. James Stars
- 1999–00 - No Competition
- 2000–01 - New Westminster Beavers
- 2001–02 - Trail Smoke Eaters
- 2002–03 - Trail Smoke Eaters
- 2003–04 - East Kootenay Royals
- 2004–05 - Kitimat Ice Demons
- 2005–06 - Kitimat Ice Demons
- 2006–07 - Rossland Warriors
- 2007–08 - Kitimat Ice Demons
- 2008–09 - Williams Lake Stampeders
- 2009–10 - Powell River Regals
- 2010–11 - Kitimat Ice Demons
- 2011–12 - Smithers Steelheads
- 2012–13 - Williams Lake Stampeders
- 2013–14 - Williams Lake Stampeders
- 2014–15 - Fort St. John Flyers
- 2015–16 - Fort St. John Flyers
- 2016–17 - Whitehorse Huskies
- 2017–18 - Dawson Creek Canucks
- 2018–19 - Dawson Creek Canucks
- 2019–20 - No competition
- 2020–21 - No competition
- 2021–22 - Dawson Creek Canucks
- 2022–23 - Quesnel Kangaroos
- 2023–24 - Terrace River Kings
- 2024–25 - Terrace River Kings
- 2025–26 - Dawson Creek Canucks

== Sources ==
- Pelletier, Joe (17 March 2013). "Williams Lake Stampeders win 2013 Coy Cup". Terrace Standard. Black Press Media.
- "Williams Lake Stampeders history". Williams Lake Stampeders. 27 January 2011. Archived from the original on 27 January 2011.
- Carlson, Shane (29 September 2023). "Powell River Regals announced as 2024 Coy Cup hosts". The Peak. Glacier Media Group.
- "River Kings advance to Coy Cup following OT thriller in Williams Lake". North Coast Review. 19 March 2024.
- Carlson, Shane (27 March 2024). "Powell River Regals open 2024 Coy Cup with tie versus Terrace". The Peak. Glacier Media Group.
- Waddell, Justin (28 March 2024). "Regals poised for another Coy Cup win as tournament gets underway in Powell River". My Powell River Now.
- Carlson, Shane (31 March 2024). "Terrace wins Coy Cup over Powell River Regals". The Peak. Glacier Media Group.
- "Prince Rupert rampage to host 2025 Coy Cup BC Hockey". bchockey.net (Press release). Saanichton, B.C.: BC Hockey. 3 October 2024.
- "Terrace River Kings to host 2027 Coy Cup". bchockey.net (Press release). Saanichton, B.C.: BC Hockey. 13 August 2026.
