= Williams Lake Stampeders =

Defunct senior ice hockey club

- City: Williams Lake, British Columbia
- League: CIHL
- Founded: 1996
- Folded: 2026
- Home arena: Cariboo Memorial Complex
- Colours
- Website: wlstampeders.ca

Championships
- League: 2010
- Provincial: 2009; 2013; 2014

The Williams Lake Stampeders is a defunct senior ice hockey club and former franchise of the Central Interior Hockey League (CIHL) based in Williams Lake, British Columbia.

The senior team played in the Cariboo Hockey League from the league's founding in 1936 until 1979. The Stampeders won the league title twice, in 1960–61 and 1962–63.

The Stampeders CIHL franchise was established in 1996, the same year that the Williams Lake Mustangs (1978–1996) of the Rocky Mountain Junior Hockey League (RMJHL) folded.

In 2009, the Stampeders won the provincial championship Coy Cup. In 2010 the Stampeders won their first CIHL championship with a two-game sweep of the Kitimat Ice Demons. The team then went on to a third-place finish in the Coy Cup.

The Stampeders won consecutive provincial championships in 2013 and 2014.

The club folded in 2026 citing a shortage of players.
