= Vanderhoof Bears =

Ice hockey team in British Columbia

The Vanderhoof Bears were a senior and intermediate ice hockey team in Vanderhoof, British Columbia. They played in the Cariboo Hockey League and the Pacific Northwest Hockey League until 1983-84. The team folded in 1984.

The name is currently used by several local teams, including a midget hockey team.
