= Central Interior Hockey League =

Senior ice hockey league

- Current season or competition: 2025–26
- Official logo
- Countries: Canada
- Region: British Columbia
- President: Adam Moreash
- No. of teams: 5
- Championship: Cameron Kerr Cup
- Associated title: Coy Cup
- Recent champions: Quesnel Kangaroos (2026)
- Website: Official website

The Central Interior Hockey League is a senior ice hockey loop with 5 teams based in British Columbia.

== Cameron Kerr Memorial Cup ==
CIHL teams play for the league championship Cameron Kerr Memorial Cup. Cameron Kerr was a former member of the Terrace River Kings when he was struck and killed by an automobile in a hit-and-run while walking in 2018.

== Coy Cup ==
The Coy Cup is awarded to the BC Hockey senior men's 'AA' championship team. It was donated by its namesake, Colonel Coy of the 50th Gordon Highlanders regiment. It was first awarded in the 1922–23 season. It is traditionally contested in a four-team round-robin tournament between the champions of the CIHL, the champions of the NPHL, a qualifier from another part of the province and the host city team.

== Teams ==
The league had five teams as of 2026.

League
Team	Home	Arena
Kitimat Ice Demons	Kitimat	Tamitik Arena
Prince Rupert Rampage	Prince Rupert	Jim Ciccone Civic Centre
Quesnel Kangaroos	Quesnel	West Fraser Centre
Smithers Steelheads	Smithers	Smithers Civic Centre
Terrace River Kings	Terrace	Terrace Sportsplex

== See also ==
- Allan Cup
- Allan Cup Hockey
- BC Hockey
- Coy Cup
- Hockey Canada
- North Peace Hockey League
- Rossland Warriors
- Savage Cup
- Senior ice hockey

== Sources ==
- "Getting together with old friends for the Appollos Alumni Hockey Game". Lake Cowichan Gazette. Black Press Media. 7 March 2011.
- Pelletier, Joe (13 February 2013). "It's all about the hometown heroes". Terrace Standard. Black Press Media.
- Sabatino, Greg (4 March 2013). "Steelheads beat Stamps for second straight SMP Cup". The Williams Lake Tribune. Black Press Media.
- "Smithers Steelheads win CIHL trophy". Terrace Standard. Black Press Media. 8 March 2016.
- Lieuwen, Jackie (18 July 2017). "CIHL shrinking next season". The Northern View. Black Press Media.
- Kurial, Alex (2 August 2019). "Expansion newcomers bolster CIHL". The Northern View. Black Press Media.
- Bakker, Marisca (4 September 2019). "Steelheads return to CIHL is official". The Interior News. Black Press Media.
- Parhar, Aman (14 March 2020). "New CIHL team being built with players from Vanderhoof and Fort St. James". Vanderhoof Omineca Express. Black Press Media.
- Bogstie, Ben (25 November 2020). "Central Interior Hockey League cancels 2020/21 season". Terrace Standard. Black Press Media.
- Dyok, Rebecca (16 June 2021). "Nechako North Stars preparing for regular season play with Central Interior Hockey League". Vanderhoof Omineca Express. Black Press Media.
- Bogstie, Ben (19 October 2021). "Skeena Voices | The man behind the Terrace River Kings". Terrace Standard. Black Press Media.
- Paul, Binny (19 January 2022). "'It's out of everyone's control': Northern B.C. hockey teams ask league to reconsider fines for COVID-19 cancellations". Prince George Citizen.
- Millar, Kimberley (3 October 2022). "Prince Rupert Rampage to start new CIHL season at home". The Northern View. Black Press Media.
- Peebles, Frank (2 April 2023). "Kangaroos win Coy Cup on Quesnel home ice". Terrace Standard. Black Press Media.
- Peebles, Frank (6 August 2023). "Quesnel Kangaroos player becomes coach, stays player". Quesnel Cariboo Observer. Black Press Media.
- Carlson, Shane (29 September 2023). "Powell River Regals announced as 2024 Coy Cup hosts". The Peak. Glacier Media Group.
- Henderson, George (5 February 2024). "Quesnel Kangaroos ready to defend Central Interior Hockey League title". My Cariboo Now.
- Barker, Thom (21 February 2024). "CIHL divisional final matchups decided". The Interior News. Black Press Media.
- "River Kings advance to Coy Cup following OT thriller in Williams Lake". North Coast Review. 19 March 2024.
- Carlson, Shane (27 March 2024). "Powell River Regals open 2024 Coy Cup with tie versus Terrace". The Peak. Glacier Media Group.
- Waddell, Justin (28 March 2024). "Regals poised for another Coy Cup win as tournament gets underway in Powell River". My Powell River Now.
- Carlson, Shane (31 March 2024). "Terrace wins Coy Cup over Powell River Regals". The Peak. Glacier Media Group.
- "Terrace River Kings Win Coy Cup". CFTK-TV. Bell Media. 1 April 2024.
- "Regals gear up for season opener". The Peak. Glacier Media Group. 25 April 2024.
- Carlson, Shane (25 April 2024). "25 years ago in the Peak: Powell River Regals at 1999 Allan Cup". The Peak. Glacier Media Group.
- Simpson, Sarah (29 August 2024). "Lake Cowichan Appollos hockey club resurrected". Cowichan Valley Citizen. Black Press Media.
- Barker, Thom (9 September 2024). "Rampage season opener scheduled for Sept. 28". The Northern View. Black Press Media.
- Simpson, Sarah (11 October 2024). "Appollos start comeback season with OT victory". Chemainus Valley Courier. Black Press Media.
- Simpson, Sarah (19 October 2024). "Lake Cowichan Appollos win second straight OT thriller". Lake Cowichan Gazette. Black Press Media.
- Kelly, Austin (25 October 2024). "Quesnel Kangaroos' Tomassetti smashes CIHL record". Williams Lake Tribune. Black Press Media.
- Bhathal, Harvin (31 March 2025). "Terrace repeats as Coy Cup champions". Terrace Standard. Black Press Media.
- Smith, Damian (1 April 2025). "Rampage host, River Kings win Coy Cup". CFTK-TV | Terrace News. Bell Media.
- Bhathal, Harvin (17 March 2025). "Terrace River Kings win second straight Cameron Kerr Trophy". Terrace Standard. Black Press Media.
- "Terrace River Kings to host 2027 Coy Cup". bchockey.net (Press release). Saanichton, B.C.: BC Hockey. 13 August 2026.
