= Kenora Thistles (intermediate) =

- City: Kenora, Ontario
- League: Thunder Bay Intermediate Hockey League
- Operated: 1950s–1970s
- Home arena: Kenora Arena
- Colours: Maroon and White

The Kenora Thistles were a Canadian ice hockey team based in Kenora, Ontario. The team competed at the intermediate hockey of the Canadian Amateur Hockey Association, one level below the senior ice hockey leagues. The team won the Edmonton Journal Trophy as the intermediate level champions of Western Canada in 1953.

== History ==
In the 1950s the Kenora Thistles moniker was resurrected by a team that participated in the Thunder Bay Intermediate Hockey League. They also spent time in Manitoba's Big Six Intermediate Hockey League. Kenora is more local to the Winnipeg-based Manitoba Senior Leagues, but were constantly snubbed when applying to join. In with Marathon, Keewatin, Fort Frances, Fort William, and Port Arthur, the Thistles did quite well winning the league in 1953, 1955, 1957, and 1958 and winning the Edmonton Journal Trophy as the top Intermediate team in Western Canada in 1953.

In the 1952–53 season, the Thistles won their first ever Thunder Bay district championship and moved on to the Western Canadian championships. In the semifinal, the Thistles met the Manitoba champion Dauphin Kings who they defeated three-games-to-none with 4–2, 7–3, and 5–4 victories. In the Edmonton Journal Trophy finals, the Thistles met the Alberta champion Ponoka Stampeders. Kenora won game on 7–4, but were blown out 8–1 in game two. The Thistles rebounded and took game three 5–3 and game four 8–4 before Ponoka could respond with a 3–2 win in game five to make the series three-games-to-two for Kenora. Game six was another do-or-die game for the Stampeders, but the Thistles were victorious winning the game 5–1 to take the series.

The Thistles were considered by the Canadian Amateur Hockey Association (CAHA) to represent Canada at the 1954 Ice Hockey World Championships, but the team opted instead for a tour of Japan. CAHA vice-president Jimmy Dunn accompanied the Thistles on an international goodwill exhibition tour, which was the first trip to Japan by a Canadian team since 1936. On the seven-week tour, Dunn handled the business affairs for the Thistles which included travel aboard the Japanese ocean liner Hikawa Maru from Vancouver. From March 24 until April 3, the Thistles played against the best Japan had to offer in Osaka and Tokyo. They defeated the Japan College All-Stars 23–1, the "All Japan" team 5 times (11–2, 4–2, 9–3, 8–2, 12–7), Nikko Electric 17–2, Hokkaido All-Stars 8–1, and the Kanto All-Stars 13–6.

In 1955, the Thistles entered the Thunder Bay district championship as the Western representatives in a best-of-5 series against the Marathon Mercurys, North Shore champions. The Thistles destroyed the Mercurys with scores of 6–1, 11–1, and 5–0 to take the series and another Thunder Bay title. In the Edmonton Journal Trophy semi-final, the Thistles met Manitoba's Brandon Wheat Kings in a best-of-five series. Kenora led the series after game one with a 6–3 win, they lost game two 5–0, but led again after game three with a 4–1 victory. Brandon then, with their backs to the wall, came back to tie the series with a 6–2 win and then took it with a final 5–1 victory in game five. Brandon went on to win the Edmonton Journal Trophy.

In the late 1950s, the Thistles became members of the Minnesota-Ontario Hockey League. This lasted until the early 1960s. The 1956 Thunder Bay district semifinal was won over the Thistles by the Fort Frances Canadians 3-games-to-2.

The 1957 Thunder Bay district semifinal was between Kenora and the Fort Frances Canadians. Fort Frances took game one 8–5 and Kenora took game two 8–4. Fort Frances took game three, but Kenora came back and won game four 8–2 and game five 3–2 to win the series. In the district final, the Thistles took on the Marathon Mercurys in a best-of-five series. Kenora won game one 9–0 and then the two teams tied game two 3–3. In game three Kenora won 6–2 and Marathon won game four 5–4 to stay alive. Game five was the clincher for Kenora as they won 4–0 to take a third district title. In the Edmonton Journal Trophy semifinals, the Thistles were swept three-games-to-none by Manitoba's Pine Falls Paper Kings (2–1, 7–3, 5–3).

In 1958, the Kenora Thistles joined the Ontario-Minnesota Hockey League. In the Thunder Bay district final, they faced the town of Red Rock in a best-of-five series. The Thistles won three-games-to-two. In the Western Canadian semi-final, the Thistles played Saskatchewan's Yorkton Millers in a best-of-three series. Game one was a 4–4 tie, game two was won by Yorkton 4–2, and game three was won by Kenora 4–0. All tied up, the Millers and Thistles tied again in game four 1–1, but game five was won by Kenora 2–0 to win the series two-games-to-one with 2 ties. Then the Thistles made their last ever appearance in the Edmonton Journal Trophy finals against Alberta's Olds Elks. Kenora took game one 4–2, but Olds swept the next four games 6–3, 5–3, 4–1, and 7–6 to win the Western Canadian crown.

Kenora lost the 1959 Thunder Bay district semi-final to the Fort Frances Canadians 4-games-to-2.
