= Olympic Rink =

Demolished indoor ice rink

Coordinates: 49.9227°N 97.1288°W

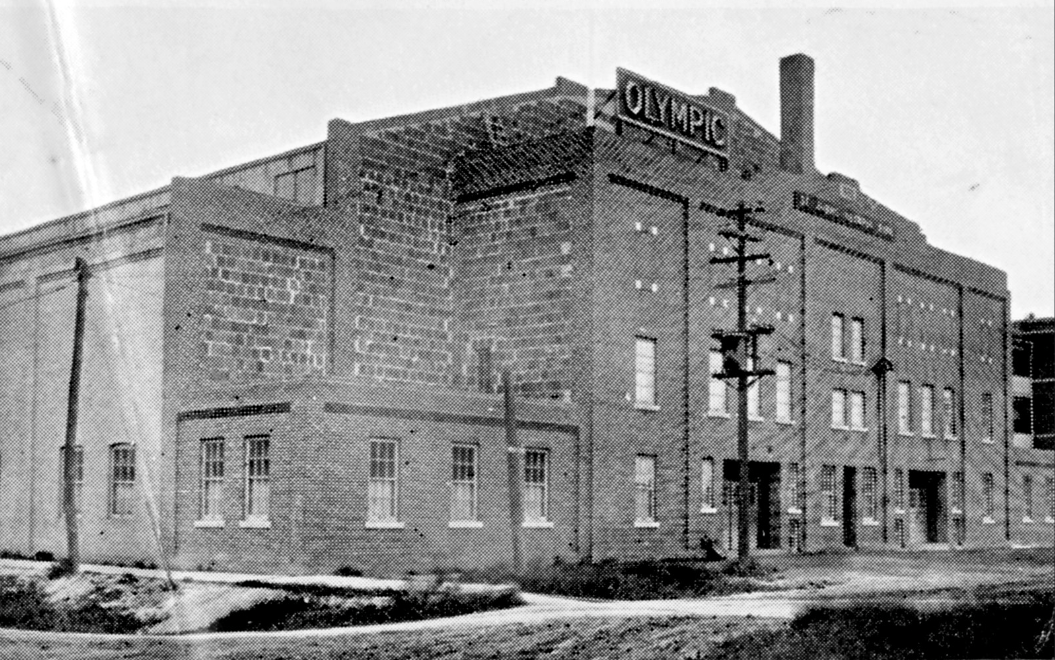
Olympic Rink c. 1925

The Olympic Rink was an indoor ice hockey arena in Winnipeg, Manitoba, Canada. It was located at the corner of Church Avenue and Charles Street in the North End neighbourhood. The site of the former rink was later occupied by the Olympic Towers apartments.

== History ==
The Olympic Rink was home to several leagues including the Winnipeg Junior and Juvenile Hockey League, convened by Jimmy Dunn as the north division of the Manitoba Junior Hockey League from 1926 onward. The rink was also home to the Winnipeg and District Intermediate League during the 1940s. In 1945, junior ice hockey teams complained to the Manitoba Amateur Hockey Association about the unsanitary dressing room conditions and felt that the association had an obligation to make the necessary upgrades if the rink's ownership did not.

The rink operated from its construction without artificial ice until 1955. The winter temperatures in Winnipeg allowed this even though it was indoors. In 1955, it rink acquired by the owners of the Winnipeg Warriors after the demolition of the Shea's Amphitheatre. The ice-making facility from the Amphitheatre was purchased and relocated to the Olympic Rink. The Warriors relocated their associated teams, the Winnipeg Braves and the St. Boniface Canadiens to the rink.

In the 1960s, the Olympic was converted to a curling rink. When this use no longer proved economical, the rink was offered by its owners to the City of Winnipeg to be used as a recreational facility. This offer was not taken up and the Olympic was demolished and the site was later occupied by the Olympic Towers apartments.
