= British Columbia Senior Hockey League =

The British Columbia Senior Hockey League is a defunct men's senior ice hockey league that operated within the British Columbia Amateur Hockey Association for only two seasons, 1979–80 and 1980–81.

== Teams ==
The league included the following teams:

- Kamloops Cowboys
- North Delta Hurry Kings
- Prince George Mohawks
- Quesnel Kangaroos

== List of champions ==
- 1979-80: Delta Hurry Kings
- 1980-81: Quesnel Kangaroos
