= British Columbia Amateur Hockey Association =

Ice hockey governing body of British Columbia and Yukon Territory

BC Hockey
- Sport: Ice hockey
- Jurisdiction: British Columbia and Yukon
- Abbreviation: BC Hockey
- Founded: 1919
- Headquarters: Victoria
- Chairman: Stephanie White
- CEO: Cameron Hope

Official website
- bchockey.net
- (Canada)
- (British Columbia)
- (Yukon)

The British Columbia Amateur Hockey Association, more commonly known as BC Hockey, is a non-profit organization and member branch of Hockey Canada in charge of governing amateur hockey at all levels in British Columbia and Yukon Territory. It comprises approximately 150 minor hockey associations, 55,000 players, 4,500 referees, and 20,000 official volunteers.

== History ==
Founded in 1919 as the British Columbia Amateur Hockey Association, BC Hockey has seen many changes and substantial growth over the years. The organization continues to strive to provide training and resources for volunteers so that they may better serve the amateur hockey community.

In 2023, the "junior A" British Columbia Hockey League withdrew from BC Hockey and Hockey Canada to become an independent league. The league cited improved recruitment opportunities for 16 and 17 year old players in Canada as well as anticipated improved interest from Americans and players outside of North America as important reasons for the decision. BC Hockey then announced plans to restructure its junior hockey framework. The three Junior B leagues (PJHL, KIJHL and VIJHL) were summarily designated as "Junior A Tier 2", with plans to conduct an independent evaluation of those teams seeking to be promoted to "Junior A Tier 1". It was expected that those teams promoted to Tier 1 would eventually apply for membership in the CJHL. The league expected the evaluations to be completed during the 2024-25 season. In April 2024, the VIJHL announced that it would also withdraw from the Hockey Canada framework and become an independent farm league for the BCHL beginning in the 2024-25 season.

In the 2024–25 season, Hockey Canada and its four western affiliates – BC Hockey, Hockey Alberta, Hockey Saskatchewan and Hockey Manitoba – will pilot the Western Canadian Development Model (WCDM). Under the WCDM, junior leagues will adopt most of the Western Hockey League rulebook, excluding some sections, and restrictions on 15-year-old affiliate players in the Western Hockey League will be loosened. Players that will be 18-years of age or older in the calendar year will be allowed to choose whether to use full-face protection or half-face protection, whilst younger players will be required to use full-face protection.

The WCDM was expanded in the 2025–26 season to include the following rules changes:

- Western Junior A teams will be permitted to register up to five U.S.-born players at one time on their active roster, a decrease from the previous six.
- 16- and 17-year-old U.S.-born players who have been drafted, listed or signed by a WHL team will be eligible to be rostered by any Western Junior A team.
- Each Western Junior A team will be eligible to roster one 16- or 17-year-old player whose parent(s) reside(s) outside of their province or region, if the player has been drafted, listed or signed by a WHL team
  - Up to a maximum of 23 such players across all Western Junior A teams, or one player from each WHL team.
- Out-of-province players who participate in the Canadian Sport School Hockey League (CSSHL) will be eligible to affiliate with Western Junior A teams in their school’s respective province or region.
- No more than eight players born in a province not participating in the WCDM may be registered on the active roster of a Western Junior A team.

== Governance ==
The organization is overseen by a board of directors composed of 9 elected members.

=== Notable executives ===
- Doug Grimston (1900–1955), BCAHA president from 1942 to 1947, and Canadian Amateur Hockey Association president from 1950 to 1952

== Leagues ==
- British Columbia Hockey Conference
- Kootenay International Junior Hockey League
- Pacific Junior Hockey League
- BC Elite Hockey League - U18 "AAA"
- Pacific Coast Amateur Hockey Association

=== Independent teams ===
- Fort St. John Flyers Senior "AAA" (North Peace Hockey League)
- Powell River Regals Senior "AA"

=== Defunct Leagues ===
- British Columbia Senior Hockey League
- Cariboo Hockey League
- Central Interior Hockey League
- Okanagan Mainline League
- Pacific Coast Junior Hockey League
- Pacific Northwest Hockey League
- Rocky Mountain Junior Hockey League
- West Kootenay League
- Western International Hockey League

== See also ==
- List of ice hockey teams in British Columbia
