= Mason City Toros =

- City: Mason City, Iowa
- League: North American 3 Hockey League
- Division: Central
- Founded: 2011
- Home arena: Mason City Arena
- Colors: Green, blue, white
- Owners: Alberto Fernandez, F&S Management
- General manager: Nick Fabrizio
- Head coach: Alex North
- Affiliates: Houston Bulls
- Website: www.northiowabulls.com

Franchise history
- 2011–2021: North Iowa Bulls
- 2021–2026: Mason City Toros
- 2026–present: North Iowa Bulls

Championships
- Regular season titles: 2: 2014, 2016
- League champions: 4: 2013, 2014, 2016, 2021
- Division titles: 8: 2013, 2014, 2015, 2016, 2017, 2018, 2020, 2021

The Mason City Toros are a Tier III junior ice hockey team in the North American 3 Hockey League (NA3HL). The Toros play their home games at the Mason City Arena in Mason City, Iowa. The organization was previously known as the North Iowa Bulls before it acquired a Tier II franchise, the Amarillo Bulls, relocated it to Mason City, and transferred its previous name to the new club.

== History ==
=== Tier III: 2011–present ===
The Bulls began playing in 2011, losing their first game to the Chicago Hitmen 3–1 before earning their first win on October 2, 2011, with a 5–4 win over the Peoria Mustangs. After losing seven of their first eight, the team finished 29–15–0–4 and second place in the West Division. The Bulls won their first round series over the Twin City Steel two-games-to-none, but lost their division final series to the Granite City Lumberjacks two-games-to-one. The teams traded overtime victories in the first two games before the Lumberjacks took the final game by a score of 3–2.

The Bulls won their first division championship the following year finishing 41–4–1–2. They swept the Minnesota Flying Aces in three games in the first round before advancing through round-robin play at the Silver Cup tournament to beat Granite City 3–2 in overtime. An 11–0 win over the Peoria Mustangs gave the team its first league championship. The Bulls then advanced to the USA Hockey Tier III Junior National Championships in Rochester, Minnesota, sweeping all three games in pool play. The Bulls defeated the Helena Bighorns in double-overtime in the semifinal and won their first Tier III Junior National Championship with a 6–2 win over the Twin Cities Northern Lights.

In the 2013–14 season, North Iowa set an NA3HL record with 90 points, finishing with a 45–3 record and their second straight West Division title. The team's top line of Matt Kroska, Rihards Marenis, and Timothy Santopoalo combined for 353 points, with Kroska's 122 points and Marenis's 55 goals setting the league records in both categories. After sweeping the Twin City Steel in the first round of the NA3HL playoffs, they once again met the Lumberjacks in the West Division finals, winning the decisive third game by a 9–5 score to advance to their second straight Silver Cup Tournament. The Bulls then outscored their opponents 24–4 over the next four games. They defeated the Flint Jr. Generals 3–0 to win their second straight Silver Cup. North Iowa advanced to the Tier III Junior National Championships in Simsbury, Connecticut, again going 3–0 in round-robin play against the Florida Jr. Blades, Dells Ducks, and Boston Bandits. The Bulls defeated the Northern Cyclones 5–1 in the semifinal game before losing 2–1 in the championship game to the Boston Junior Bruins of the USPHL Premier Division.

In 2014–15, the Bulls had a record of 6–4 through the first ten games on the road before returning home and winning 11 straight games. The Bulls and Lumberjacks led the West Division throughout the entire season, leading up to the final weekend series between the two teams to end the regular season with the Bulls winning to finish with a 37–9–1 record and the West Division title. In the playoffs, the Bulls swept the Twin City Steel in two games then defeated Granite City in three games in the division finals. In round-robin play at the Silver Cup Tournament, the Bulls defeated Granite City, the West Michigan Wolves, and the Great Falls Americans. The Bulls then lost the Silver Cup championship game to the Lumberjacks. The Bulls still advanced to the Tier III national championship as the league runners-up in Simsbury, Connecticut. The tournament was split into an "A" and "B" division with the Bulls in the "A" Division with the Granite City Lumberjacks, Dells Ducks, and Northern Cyclones. The Bulls would go 2–1 in the tournament, losing only to the Lumberjacks once again. The Bulls advanced to the title game over the Lumberjacks due to a higher score differential. The Bulls won their second Tier III national championship over the Northern Cyclones, 2–1.

North Iowa finished the 2015–16 season with a 42–2–3 record after moving to the Central Division, including a 27-game winning streak and a league-record 57 goals from captain Brett Gravelle. The Bulls defeated the Rochester Ice Hawks and La Crosse Freeze in two-game sweeps to reach the Silver Cup Tournament for the fourth straight year. The Bulls defeated the Yellowstone Quake and Great Falls Americans in the round-robin, followed by an overtime win against Twin City in the semifinal and a 4–1 victory over the Metro Jets for their third league championship in four seasons.

The Bulls earned their fifth straight trip to the Silver Cup tournament the following 2016–17 season, with another division title and a 35–10–1–1 finish in the regular season. North Iowa swept Rochester and La Crosse in two games each to advance to the Silver Cup tournament. The Bulls won two games against the Long Beach Sharks and Binghamton Jr. Senators but lost to Yellowstone in the round-robin and did not advance. North Iowa won one more Central Division title in 2017–18, going 39–4–2–2 and sweeping the Wausau RiverWolves in two games in the first round. The La Crosse Freeze then defeated the Bulls with a two-game sweep in the Central Division finals, failing to make a tournament appearance for the first time since their inaugural season.

North Iowa finished in second place in their return to the West Division in 2018–19, going 32–12–3 and finishing behind Granite City with 67 points. The Bulls defeated the Rochester Grizzlies in a three-game series. The Alexandria Blizzard beat the top-seeded Granite City in a three-game first-round series, advancing to the West Division Finals before the Bulls swept them in two games. North Iowa split its first two games at the Fraser Cup tournament, formerly known as the Silver Cup, with a loss to the Lewiston/Auburn Nordiques and a win over the Helena Bighorns, but ended their season with a 3–1 loss to the eventual champion Texas Jr. Brahmas in the semifinal.

The Bulls took the West Division title in 2019–20, going 38–7–2 for the season and winning their final eight games. The team also moved out of its longtime home at the North Iowa Ice Arena, moving downtown to the new Mason City Multipurpose Arena at midseason. The team drew record crowds in its new home, averaging 1,585 fans over its first 11 games. Prior to the start of the playoffs, the onset of the COVID-19 pandemic caused the playoffs to be cancelled.

At the time of the announcement that the North Iowa Bulls would be promoted to Tier II, it had not been decided if the organization would continue to have a Tier III team as well in 2021–22, originally deciding to only have the Tier II team in Mason City. The NA3HL Bulls won the Fraser Cup championship in their final season. The organization the stated it will still operate a Tier III team, but has not determined a brand or location. On June 1, 2021, the organization announced the Tier III team had been rebranded the Mason City Toros and would remain in Mason City for at least one more season. With Sanden staying on as head coach of the Tier II Bulls, the Toros hired Nick Bruneteau as the next head coach.

The 2024-2025 season would be the first season that the junior tier III Mason City team would not make playoffs.

In the summer of 2025. The Mason City Toros announced they hired Alex North as their next head coach. North had previously worked as an assistant coach for the North Iowa Bulls the season prior. North had also previously coached for the tier III Bulls in 2014 as an assistant, where he won a championship.

On March 18th, 2026. The Mason City Toros announced they would change their name back to the North Iowa Bulls in conjunction with the tier II NAHL North Iowa Bulls moving to Houston, TX. Keeping the Bulls name in Mason City.

== Season-by-season records ==
Season	GP	W	L	OTL	PTS	GF	GA	Regular season finish	Playoffs
2011–12	48	29	15	4	62	172	156	2nd of 4, West Div. 4th of 16, NA3HL	Won Division Semifinals, 2–0 vs. Twin City Steel; Lost Division Finals, 1–2 Granite City Lumberjacks
2012–13	48	41	4	3	85	297	114	1st of 5, West Div. 2nd of 17, NA3H	Won Division Semifinals, 3–0 vs. Minnesota Flying Aces; 2–0–0 in Silver Cup round-robin (W, 5–0 vs. Flint Jr. Generals; OTW, 3–2 vs. Granite City Lumberjacks); Won Silver Cup Championship game, 11–0 vs. Peoria Mustangs
2013–14	48	45	3	0	90	334	92	1st of 5, West Div. 1st of 21, NA3HL	Won Division Semifinals, 2–0 vs. Twin City Steel; Won Division Finals, 2–1 vs. Granite City Lumberjacks; 3–0–0 in Silver Cup round-robin (W, 7–1 vs. Euless Junior Stars; W, 7–0 vs. St. Louis Jr. Blues; W, 7–3 vs. Flint Jr. Generals); Won Silver Cup Championship game, 3–0 vs. Flint Jr. Generals
2014–15	47	37	9	1	75	245	109	1st of 6, West Div. 2nd of 31, NA3HL	Won Division Semifinals, 2–0 vs. Twin City Steel; Won Division Finals, 2–1 vs. Granite City Lumberjacks; 3–0–0 in Silver Cup round-robin (W, 7–4 vs. Granite City Lumberjacks; W, 2–0 vs. West Michigan Wolves; W, 6–1 vs. Great Falls Americans); Lost Championship game, 2–3 vs. Granite City Lumberjacks
2015–16	47	42	2	3	87	301	63	1st of 5, Central Div. 1st of 34, NA3HL	Won Division Semifinals, 2–0 vs. Rochester Ice Hawks; Won Division Finals, 2–0 vs. La Crosse Freeze; 2–1–0 in Silver Cup round-robin (W, 6–2 vs. Yellowstone Quake; W, 4–1 vs. Great Falls Americans; L, 3–4 vs. Point Mallard Ducks); Won Silver Cup Semifinal game, 4–3 OT vs. Twin City Steel; Won Silver Cup Championship game, 4–1 vs. Metro Jets
2016–17	47	35	10	2	72	268	111	1st of 5, Central Div; 8th of 48, NA3HL	Won Division Semifinals, 2–0 vs. Rochester Ice Hawks; Won Division Finals, 2–0 vs. La Crosse Freeze; 2–1–0 in Silver Cup round-robin (L, 2–4 vs. Yellowstone Quake; OTW, 3–2 vs. Binghamton Jr. Senators; W, 8–4 vs. Long Beach Sharks)
2017–18	47	39	4	4	82	304	92	1st of 5, Central Div; 2nd of 42, NA3HL	Won Division Semifinals, 2–0 vs. Wausau RiverWolves; Lost Division Finals, 0–2 vs. La Crosse Freeze
2018–19	47	32	12	3	67	228	121	2nd of 7, West Div; 11th of 36, NA3HL	Won Division Semifinals, 2–1 vs. Rochester Grizzlies; Won Div. Finals, 2–0 vs. Alexandria Blizzard; 1–1–0 in Fraser Cup round-robin (L, 4–7 vs. Lewiston/Auburn Nordiques; W, 8–2 vs. Helena Bighorns); Lost Semifinal game, 1–3 vs. Texas Jr. Brahmas
2019–20	47	38	7	2	78	272	96	1st of 6, West Div; 4th of 34, NA3HL	Playoffs cancelled
2020–21	40	27	11	2	56	182	104	1st of 5, West Div; 8th of 31, NA3HL	Won Div. Semifinals, 2–1 vs. Alexandria Blizzard; Won Div. Finals, 2–1 vs. Willmar WarHawks; 2–0–0 in Fraser Cup round-robin Pool A (OTW, 2–1 vs. Sheridan Hawks; W, 8–1 vs. Northeast Generals); Won Semifinal game, 2–1 vs. Oklahoma City Jr. Blazers; Won Fraser Cup Championship game, 5–1 vs. Rochester Grizzlies
2021–22	47	33	13	1	67	241	217	2nd of 6, West Div; 8th of 31, NA3HL	Won Div. Semifinals, 2–0 vs. Willmar WarHawks; Lost Div. Finals, 1–2 vs. Granite City Lumberjacks
2022–23	47	30	16	1	61	183	156	3rd of 6, West Div; 12th of 34, NA3HL	Lost Div. Semifinals, 1–2 vs. Alexandria Blizzard
2023–24	47	24	20	3	51	201	167	4th of 6, West Div; 18th of 34, NA3HL	Lost Div. Semifinals, 1-2 vs. Granite City Lumberjacks
2024–25	47	17	23	7	41	160	196	6th of 6, West Div; 25th of 35, NA3HL	Did not qualify
2025–26	47	20	22	5	45	169	196	4th of 6, West Div; 22nd of 38, NA3HL	Lost Div. Semifinals, 0-2 vs. Granite City Lumberjacks
North Iowa Bulls

== USA Hockey Tier III Junior Hockey National Championship ==
Year	Round-Robin	Record	Place	Semifinal	Championship
2013	W, 5–2 vs. New Hampshire Jr. Monarchs (EmJHL); W, 7–0 vs. Bellingham Blazers (NPHL); W, 5–1 vs. Twin Cities Northern Lights (MnJHL)	3–0–0	1st of 4 National Pool	OTW, 3–2 vs. Helena Bighorns (AWHL)	W, 6–2 vs. Twin Cities Northern Lights (MnJHL); National champions
2014	W, 5–0 vs. Florida Jr. Blades (USPHL-Empire); W, 5–1 vs. Dells Ducks (MnJHL); W, 11–2 vs. Boston Bandits (MetJHL)	3–0–0	1st of 4 Pool C	W, 5–1 vs. Northern Cyclones (EHL)	L, 1–4 vs. Boston Junior Bruins (USPHL-Premier)
2015	W, 3–1 vs. Northern Cyclones (EHL); W, 2–1 vs. Dells Ducks (MnJHL); L, 3–4 vs. Granite City Lumberjacks (NA3HL)	2–1–0	2nd of 4 Div. 1	Not played	W, 2–1 vs. Northern Cyclones (EHL); National champions
