= 2024–25 NA3HL season =

2024–25 NAHL season
- League: North American 3 Hockey League
- Sport: Ice hockey
- Duration: Regular season September 6, 2024 – March 9, 2025; Postseason; March 12 – March 30, 2025
- Games: 47
- Teams: 35

Regular season
- Season champions: Helena Bighorns
- Season MVP: Adam Prokop (West Bend Power)
- Top scorer: Joesph Crowley (Texas Jr. Brahmas)

Fraser Cup Playoffs
- Finals champions: Louisiana Drillers
- Runners-up: West Bend Power

NA3HL seasons
- ← 2023–24 2025–26 →

The 2024–25 NA3HL season is the 15th season of the North American 3 Hockey League. The regular season ran from September 6, 2024 to March 9, 2025 with a 47-game schedule for each team. The Helena Bighorns won the regular season championship. The Louisiana Drillers defeated the West Bend Power 5–1 in the Championship game to capture the Fraser Cup.

== Showcases ==
The league held a showcase tournament at the Schwan Super Rink in Blaine, Minnesota from December 15 to 17.

A prospect tournament was also held in mid-February at the USA Hockey Arena.

== Member changes ==
- The league reached an affiliation agreement with the ECHL's Tulsa Oilers in December of 2023. The Tulsa Jr. Oilers played their inaugural season this year.
- In April of 2024, the NAHL's Minnesota Wilderness purchased the dormant Minnesota Loons franchise and moved the club to Eveleth, Minnesota. The team took on both the name and colors of the parent club and would resume play this season. Less than a week later, the Maine Nordiques, also of the NAHL, purchased another dormant NA3HL team, the Lewiston/Auburn Nordiques. The new franchise would also possess the same name as its parent club but would use different colors.
- The NA3HL announced the addition of the Binghamton Buzz as an expansion franchise on May 9, 2025.
- The following day, the Oregon Tradesmen announced that they were relocating to Blaine, Minnesota and would become the Minnesota Moose.
- One day on, the league expanded again with the transfer of the Carolina Rage from the Carolinas Hockey League, a midget-level (under-18) circuit. Due to the team's inactivity for the previous season, their entry was delayed until the 2025–26 season.
- When the league released this season's schedule in July, neither the Danbury Jr. Hat Tricks nor the Mid-Cities Jr. Stars were included. The league did not comment on the removal of either team from the league.

== Regular season ==
The standings at the end of the regular season were as follows:

Note: x = clinched playoff berth; y = clinched division title; z = clinched regular season title

=== Standings ===
==== Central Division ====
Team	GP	W	L	OTL	SOL	Pts	GF	GA
xy – West Bend Power	47	35	8	2	2	74	194	109
x – Wausau Cyclones	47	33	11	2	1	69	194	121
x – Rochester Grizzlies	47	28	14	3	2	61	179	139
x – Wisconsin Woodsmen	47	24	16	4	3	55	200	176
St. Louis Jr. Blues	47	15	25	6	1	37	137	200
Peoria Mustangs	47	12	35	0	0	24	139	260

==== East Division ====
Team	GP	W	L	OTL	SOL	Pts	GF	GA
xy – Binghamton Buzz	47	38	8	1	0	77	224	101
x – Northeast Generals	47	28	18	1	0	57	151	145
x – Norwich Sea Captains	47	24	16	4	3	55	142	124
x – New Hampshire Jr. Mountain Kings	47	25	19	2	1	53	149	141
New Jersey Titans	47	16	27	4	0	36	112	187
Maine Nordiques	47	17	29	1	0	35	129	170
Long Beach Sharks	47	8	32	7	0	23	90	185

==== Frontier Division ====
Team	GP	W	L	OTL	SOL	Pts	GF	GA
xyz – Helena Bighorns	47	41	4	1	1	84	228	95
x – Sheridan Hawks	47	28	15	3	1	60	212	133
x – Great Falls Americans	47	25	15	4	3	60	183	134
x – Badlands Sabres	47	25	15	4	3	57	192	134
Bozeman Icedogs	47	26	18	2	1	55	185	164
Butte Irish	47	19	24	1	3	42	209	230
Gillette Wild	47	20	26	1	0	41	186	186
Yellowstone Quake	47	1	45	1	0	3	65	380

==== South Division ====
Team	GP	W	L	OTL	SOL	Pts	GF	GA
xy – Louisiana Drillers	47	40	3	3	1	84	240	89
x – New Mexico Ice Wolves	47	37	6	2	2	78	245	97
x – Texas Jr. Brahmas	47	34	11	2	0	70	216	100
x – Austin Ice Bats	47	32	13	1	1	66	190	116
Texas RoadRunners	47	16	27	4	0	36	144	178
El Paso Rhinos	47	15	29	2	1	33	116	195
Atlanta Capitals	47	11	35	1	0	23	105	269
Tulsa Jr. Oilers	47	5	40	2	0	12	75	282

==== West Division ====
Team	GP	W	L	OTL	SOL	Pts	GF	GA
xy – Granite City Lumberjacks	47	35	7	3	2	75	216	113
x – Alexandria Blizzards	47	27	18	2	0	56	174	134
x – Minnesota Moose	47	23	19	4	1	51	147	154
x – Willmar WarHawks	47	22	24	1	0	45	142	193
Minnesota Winderness	47	20	23	2	2	44	153	175
Mason City Toros	47	17	23	5	2	41	160	196

=== Statistics ===
==== Scoring leaders ====
The following players led the league in regular season points at the completion of games played on April 12, 2025.

Player	Team	GP	G	A	Pts	PIM
Joesph Crowley	Texas Jr. Brahmas	47	37	47	84	34
Josh Serino	Sheridan Hawks	47	39	43	82	28
Loghan Weber	Butte Irish	45	26	54	80	182
Vincent Leaf	Sheridan Hawks	42	34	42	76	100
Max Arlt	New Mexico Ice Wolves	46	23	52	75	14
Marcus Fritel	Mason City Toros	42	34	37	71	42
Ethan Miller	Binghamton Buzz	44	34	35	69	48
Adrian Browe	Butte Irish	44	23	45	68	30
Brody Neish	Louisiana Drillers	42	28	39	67	53
Jake Bergstrom	Louisiana Drillers	46	26	41	67	73

==== Leading goaltenders ====
Note: GP = Games played; Mins = Minutes played; W = Wins; L = Losses; OTL = Overtime losses; SO = Shutouts; GAA = Goals against average; SV% = Save percentage

Player	Team	GP	Mins	W	L	OTL	SO	GA	SV	SV%	GAA
Branson Appelman	Helena Bighorns	17	1316:53	14	2	0	3	23	368	.941	1.48
Adam Prokop	West Bend Power	20	1215:07	16	1	3	3	32	517	.938	1.58
Ryan Wallin	New Mexico Ice Wolves	31	1811:59	24	3	1	1	56	656	.915	1.85
Connor Broderick	Texas Jr. Brahmas	21	1122:50	13	3	2	0	38	536	.929	2.03
Cole Schmidt	Louisiana Drillers	23	1349:08	20	2	1	0	46	554	.917	2.05

== Fraser Cup playoffs ==
=== Divisional rounds ===
==== Central Division ====
Division Semifinals (Best-of-3)
C1	West Bend Power	3*	5*	-
C4	Wisconsin Woodsmen	2	4	-
Central Division
C2	Wausau Cyclones	2	5	1
C3	Rochester Grizzlies	3*	2	5

Division Finals (Best-of-3)
C1	West Bend Power	0	3*	3
C3	Rochester Grizzlies	4	2	2

Note: * denotes overtime period(s)

=== Central Division Semifinals ===
==== (C1) West Bend Power vs. (C4) Wisconsin Woodsmen ====
March 13	West Bend Power	3 – 2	OT	Wisconsin Woodsmen	Kettle Moraine Ice Center
No scoring		First period		No scoring
18:30 - Mike Sobaski (1)		Second period		Cole Schreiber (1) - 14:28
19:43 - Jackson Hoem (1)		Third period		Nolan Mix (1) - pp - 19:20
7:44 - pp - Jackson Hoem (2)		First overtime period		No scoring
Adam Prokop (27 saves / 29 shots)		Goalie stats		Steven Kelley (47 saves / 50 shots)

March 14	Wisconsin Woodsmen	4 – 5	OT	West Bend Power	Tomah Ice Center

West Bend wins series 2 – 0

==== (C2) Wausau Cyclones vs. (C3) Rochester Grizzlies ====
March 14	Wausau Cyclones	2 – 3	OT	Rochester Grizzlies	Marathon Park

March 15	Wausau Cyclones	2 – 5	Rochester Grizzlies	Marathon Park

March 16	Rochester Grizzlies	1 – 5	Wausau Cyclones	Rochester Recreation Center

Rochester wins series 2 – 1

=== Central Division Finals ===
==== (C1) West Bend Power vs. (C3) Rochester Grizzlies ====
March 21	West Bend Power	0 – 4	Rochester Grizzlies	Kettle Moraine Ice Center

March 22	Rochester Grizzlies	2 – 3	OT	West Bend Power	Rochester Recreation Center

March 16	West Bend Power	3 – 2	Rochester Grizzlies	Kettle Moraine Ice Center

West Bend wins series 2 – 1

==== East Division ====
Division Semifinals (Best-of-3)
E1	Binghamton Buzz	6	6	-
E4	New Hampshire Jr. Mountain Kings	2	4	-
East Division
E2	Northeast Generals	1	3	-
E3	Norwich Sea Captains	0	2	-

Division Finals (Best-of-3)
E1	Binghamton Buzz	2	4	-
E2	Northeast Generals	1	0	-

Note: * denotes overtime period(s)

=== East Division Semifinals ===
==== (E1) Binghamton Buzz vs. (E4) New Hampshire Jr. Mountain Kings ====
March 13	Binghamton Buzz	6 – 2	New Hampshire Jr. Mountain Kings	Broome Ice Center
7:46 - Keegan Elliot (1); 16:57 - Trent Midura (1)		First period	Noah Levesque (1) - 3:16
No scoring		Second period	No scoring
10:03 - Brody Bess (1); 10:17 - Owen McAlister (1); 12:05 - pp - Preston Peterson (1); 18:33 - Joey Roselli (1)		Third period	Aidan Palmeter (1) - sh - 12:21
Dalton Elliot (31 saves / 33 shots)		Goalie stats	Charlie Donoghue (32 saves / 38 shots)

March 14	New Hampshire Jr. Mountain Kings	4 – 6	Binghamton Buzz	Broome Ice Center
Xander St. Pierre (1) - pp - 16:45		First period	0:31 - Tyler Hamlin (1); 11:45 - Daniel Tirendi (1)
Nick Cox (1) - 12:41; Gabriel Leclerc (1) - pp - 13:36; Jacob Landry (1) - pp - 17:54		Second period	3:32 - Trent Midura (2); 12:10 - Ethan Miller (1)
No scoring		Third period	9:01 - Brody Bess (1); 19:48 - en - Trent Midura (3)
Charlie Donoghue (43 saves / 48 shots)		Goalie stats	Andrew Peterson (22 saves / 26 shots); Dalton Elliot (9 saves / 9 shots)

Binghamton wins series 2 – 0

==== (E2) Wausau Cyclones vs. (E3) Rochester Grizzlies ====
March 13	Northeast Generals	1 – 0	Norwich Sea Captains	Canton Ice House
16:44 - Liam Schaentzler (1)		First period	No scoring
No scoring		Second period	No scoring
No scoring		Third period	No scoring
Jascha Grossenbacher (37 saves / 37 shots)		Goalie stats	Peter Alfano (18 saves / 19 shots)

March 14	Norwich Sea Captains	2 – 3	Northeast Generals	RoseGarden Ice Arena
No scoring		First period	5:47 - pp - Easton Sankey (1); 12:46 - Ruslan Tuchyn (1); 19:49 - pp - Ryan Solari (1)
Glen Farmer (1) - 0:09		Second period	No scoring
Andrew Hill (1) - 7:44		Third period	No scoring
Peter Alfano (13 saves / 16 shots); Presley Patrin (17 saves / 17 shots)		Goalie stats	Nathan McFall (38 saves / 40 shots)

Northeast wins series 2 – 0

==== (E1) Binghamton Buzz vs. (E3) Northeast Generals ====
March 20	Binghamton Buzz	2 – 1	Northeast Generals	Broome Ice Center
12:31 - Ethan Miller (2)		First period	No scoring
15;53 - Preston Peterson (2)		Second period	Mason Frary (1) - 11:27
No scoring		Third period	No scoring
Dalton Elliot (40 saves / 41 shots)		Goalie stats	Jascha Grossenbacher (37 saves / 39 shots)

March 21	Binghamton Buzz	4 – 0	Northeast Generals	Broome Ice Center
12:22 - pp - Jason DiMatteo (1)		First period	No scoring
5:49 - sh - Griffin Gagnon (1)		Second period	No scoring
0:38 - Joey Roselli (2); 18:42 - pp - Joey Roselli (3)		Third period	No scoring
Dalton Elliot (41 saves / 41 shots)		Goalie stats	Nathan McFall (28 saves / 32 shots)

Binghamton wins series 2 – 0

==== Frontier Division ====
Division Semifinals (Best-of-3)
F1	Helena Bighorns	4	5	7
F4	Badlands Sabres	5	1	2
Frontier Division
F2	Sheridan Hawks	4	2	0
F3	Great Falls Americans	0	4	1

Division Finals (Best-of-3)
F1	Helena Bighorns	2	4	-
F3	Great Falls Americans	1	1	-

Note: * denotes overtime period(s)

==== South Division ====
Division Semifinals (Best-of-3)
S1	Louisiana Drillers	3	2	-
S4	Austin Ice Bats	0	0	-
South Division
S2	New Mexico Ice Wolves	5	2	-
S3	Texas Jr. Brahmas	2	0	-

Division Finals (Best-of-3)
S1	Louisiana Drillers	4	2	-
S2	New Mexico Ice Wolves	1	1	-

Note: * denotes overtime period(s)

==== West Division ====
Division Semifinals (Best-of-3)
W1	Granite City Lumberjacks	5	6	-
W4	Willmar WarHawks	2	1	-
South Division
W2	Alexandria Blizzard	1	0	1
W3	Minnesota Moose	0	1	2**

Division Finals (Best-of-3)
W1	Granite City Lumberjacks	8	4	-
W3	Minnesota Moose	2	2	-

Note: * denotes overtime period(s)

The winners of the five division brackets as well as the loser of the division finals with the best regular season record advanced to the national round robin series.

=== National tournament ===
	Pool A	WBP	HEL	NMW	Overall
1	West Bend Power		W 2–1	L 3–4 *	1–1
4	Helena Bighorns	L 1–2		L 2–4	0–2
5	New Mexico Ice Wolves	W 4–3 *	W 4–2		2–0

	Pool B	LOU	GCL	BIN	Overall
2	Louisiana Drillers		L 2–6	W 5–1	1–1
3	Granite City Lumberjacks	W 6–2		W 6–1	2–0
6	Binghamton Buzz	L 1–5	L 1–6		0–2

Semifinals
A1	New Mexico Ice Wolves	4
B2	Louisiana Drillers	5
B1	Granite City Lumberjacks	0
A2	West Bend Power	2

Championship
B2	Louisiana Drillers	5
A2	West Bend Power	1

Note: * denotes overtime period(s)

=== Semifinals ===
==== (A1) New Mexico Ice Wolves vs. (B2) Louisiana Drillers ====
March 29	New Mexico Ice Wolves	4 – 5	Louisiana Drillers	St. Peters Rec-Plex South
12:13 - Braeden Whitesell (2)		First period	Dayton Ruppel (1) - 0:27; Jake Bergstrom (3) - 9:43; Alexander Thomas (4) - 12:07; Carson Spear (2) - 15:59
No scoring		Second period	Casper Rys Sakrisvold (2) - pp - 12:43
2:22 - Jake Wenner (3); 18:21 - sh - Connor Hanley (1); 19:34 - sh - Braeden Whitesell (3)		Third period	No scoring
Ryan Wallin (6 saves / 9 shots); Connor Roff (19 saves / 21 shots)		Goalie stats	Cole Schmidt (19 saves / 23 shots)

==== (B1) Granite City Lumberjacks vs. (A2) West Bend Power ====
March 29	Granite City Lumberjacks	0 – 2	West Bend Power	St. Peters Rec-Plex South
No scoring		First period	No scoring
No scoring		Second period	Trace Shumlas (1) - 15:48
No scoring		Third period	Teagan Scheurer (3) - en - 19:53
Connor Miller (3 saves / 3 shots); Trent Peterson (22 saves / 23 shots)		Goalie stats	Adam Prokop (23 saves / 23 shots)

=== Fraser Cup Finals ===
==== (B2) Louisiana Drillers vs. (A2) West Bend Power ====
March 29	Louisiana Drillers	5 – 1	West Bend Power	St. Peters Rec-Plex South
15:17 - Cameron McEwan (2)		First period	Michael Maillette (1) - 19:43
7:00 - Cameron McEwan (3); 15:16 - Skylar Bawcom (3)		Second period	No scoring
10:56 - Alexander Thomas (5); 17:51 - en - Johnathon Berndt (2)		Third period	No scoring
Cole Schmidt (33 saves / 34 shots)		Goalie stats	Adam Prokop (23 saves / 27 shots)
