= Dayton Falcons =

- City: Centerville, Ohio
- League: NA3HL
- Division: Midwest
- Founded: 2007
- Home arena: South Metro Sports
- Owner(s): Ryan Colville; Jim Colville (minority)
- General manager: Ryan Colville (2015–16)
- Head coach: Ryan Colville (2015–16)
- Affiliate: Wilkes-Barre/Scranton Knights

Franchise history
- 2007–2013: Queen City Steam
- 2013–2015: Cincinnati Swords
- 2015–2017: Cincinnati Thunder
- 2017: Dayton Falcons

The Dayton Falcons were a USA Hockey-sanctioned Tier III junior ice hockey team that competed in the North American 3 Hockey League (NA3HL). The team was based in Centerville, Ohio, a suburb of Dayton, Ohio, and the team's home ice was South Metro Sports.

== Franchise history ==
The team was previously known as the Queen City Steam from 2007 to 2013 after replacing the former Cincinnati Jr. Cyclones that had folded at the end of the previous season. In 2013, the Steam re-branded as the Cincinnati Swords after the merger of two youth hockey programs in the Cincinnati area. The Swords name is a homage to the former American Hockey League team of the same name. On August 14, 2014, the NA3HL approved the sale of the Cincinnati Swords to the Miami Valley Hockey Association owned by Ryan and Jim Colville.

On April 10, 2015, the Swords announced that it would be renamed and called the Cincinnati Thunder beginning with the 2015–16 season. On June 2, 2015 the Thunder announced that they will be playing out of the historic Cincinnati Gardens for the 2015–16 season. With the sale and closing of the Cincinnati Gardens in the summer of 2016, the team began playing home games at South Metro Sports in Centerville, Ohio, near Dayton, Ohio, for the 2016–17 season. In 2017, the team stayed at South Metro and rebranded as the Dayton Falcons. After 11 games into the season with only one win using a team of about ten skaters, the team forfeited its twelfth game and was removed from the NA3HL schedule.

== Season-by-season records ==
Season	GP	W	L	OTL	SOL	Pts	GF	GA	PIM	Regular season finish	Playoffs
Queen City Steam
2007–08	48	29	16	0	3	61	220	193	1191	6th of 13, CSHL	0–3 in Hurster Cup Round Robin (L, 1–3 vs. Jr. Generals; L, 4–6 vs. Cherokee; L, 0–4 vs. Mustangs)
2008–09	45	27	15	1	2	57	212	150	1026	6th of 12, CSHL	Lost Round 1, 1–2 vs. Dubuque Thunderbirds
2009–10	48	28	18	1	1	58	191	156	1035	6th of 13, CSHL	Lost Round 1, 1–2 vs. Cleveland Jr. Lumberjacks
2010–11	45	24	18	2	1	51	152	133	893	7th of 12, NA3HL	Won Round 1, 2–0 vs. Cleveland Jr. Lumberjacks; 2–1 in Hurster Cup Round Robin (W, 2–1 vs. Mustangs; W, 5–2 vs. Jr. Flames; OTL, 4–5 vs. Hitmen); Lost Championship game, 0–4 vs. Chicago Hitmen
2011–12	48	21	25	2	0	44	157	166	877	2nd of 4, North Div. 13th of 16, NA3HL	Won Div. Semifinals, 2–0 vs. Michigan Mountain Cats; Lost Div. Finals, 0–2 vs. Flint Jr. Generals
2012–13	48	17	27	0	4	38	126	175	878	3rd of 5, Central Div. 13th of 17, NA3HL	Lost Div. Semifinals, 0–3 vs. Peoria Mustangs
Cincinnati Swords
2013–14	48	25	19	4	—	54	175	164	616	5th of 6, Central Div. 12th of 21, NA3HL	Did not qualify
2014–15	47	6	38	3	—	15	95	248	616	6th of 6, East Div. 31st of 31, NA3HL	Did not qualify
Cincinnati Thunder
2015–16	47	13	28	6	—	32	137	219	962	4th of 5, Midwest Div. 25th of 34, NA3HL	Lost Div. Semifinals, 0–2 vs. St. Louis Jr. Blues
2016–17	47	18	25	2	2	40	131	196	1203	4th of 5, Midwest Div. 33rd of 48, NA3HL	Lost Div. Semifinals, 0–2 vs. St. Louis Jr. Blues
Dayton Falcons
2017–18	12	1	10	1	0	3	15	73	215	Folded mid-season	
