= Coulee Region Chill (NA3HL) =

- City: La Crosse, Wisconsin
- League: NA3HL
- Division: Central
- Founded: 1998
- Home arena: Green Island Ice Arena
- Colors: Black, ice blue, white
- Owner(s): Michelle Bryant
- General manager: Don Babineau
- Head coach: Don Babineau

Franchise history
- 1998–2014: Flint Jr. Generals
- 2014–2018: La Crosse Freeze
- 2018–2020: Coulee Region Chill
- 2020–2021: Oklahoma City Jr. Blazers
- 2021–2022: Oklahoma City Ice Hawks
- 2022–present: New Mexico Ice Wolves

The Coulee Region Chill was a Tier III junior ice hockey team that played at the Green Island Ice Arena in La Crosse, Wisconsin. The team played in the North American 3 Hockey League. The franchise was previously known as the Flint Jr. Generals based in Flint, Michigan, and the La Crosse Freeze. Due to the loss of the Chill's home arena, the team ceased operations and the franchise was sold to the Oklahoma City Jr. Blazers organization in 2020.

== History ==
=== Flint Junior Generals ===
In 1998, Gale and Kelly Cronk, a father and son, purchased the team placing it in the Flint area. The team played at the Iceland Arena in Clayton Township.

Despite on-ice success and their age, the Jr. Generals attendance dwindled, causing long-time owners Kelly and Gale Cronk to pursue selling the team. In 2013, the Cronks declined to sell to a buyer in Fort Wayne, Indiana, as they wanted the team to stay in Michigan and handed over operations to Fairland Management, managing company of the Michigan Warriors and Perani Arena. That season, the Generals were the NA3HL playoffs runner-up and won the East Division. With no Michigan-based interest, the Cronks sold the franchise to the owners of the Coulee Region Chill of the North American Hockey League.

=== La Crosse Freeze/Coulee Region Chill ===
With the league's approval of the sale to Michelle Bryant on May 6, 2014, the Flint Junior Generals became the La Crosse Freeze and relocated to the Green Island Ice Arena in La Crosse, Wisconsin. In 2018, Bryant sold her Tier II North American Hockey League team, the Coulee Region Chill and it was relocated to become the Chippewa Steel. Bryant then renamed the Freeze to the Coulee Region Chill. In early April 2020, Bryant announced the team would not play during the 2020–21 season due to the city's decision to no longer operate Green Island Ice Arena.

On May 19, 2020, the NA3HL announced the purchase and relocation of the Chill to become the Oklahoma City Jr. Blazers.

== Season records ==
Season	GP	W	L	OTL	SOL	Pts	GF	GA	PIM	Regular season finish	Playoffs
Flint Jr. Generals
2006–07	45	31	14	0	0	62	180	129	1132	1st of 7, East; 3rd of 14, CSHL	Won Hurster Cup Qualifier series, 2–0 vs. Michigan Ice Dogs; 1–2–0 in Hurster Cup Round Robin (W, 4–2 vs. Cherokee; L, 0–4 vs. Thunderbirds; L, 2–4 vs. Jr. Blues)
2007–08	48	34	14	0	0	68	209	133	1123	2nd of 13, CSHL	1–2–0 in Hurster Cup Round Robin (W, 3–2 vs. Steam; OTL, 2–3 vs. Mustangs; L, 2–8 vs. Cherokee)
2008–09	45	17	27	1	0	35	177	228	1359	9th of 12, CSHL	Did not qualify
2009–10	48	16	31	1	0	33	188	235	1264	9th of 13, CSHL	Did not qualify
2010–11	45	21	21	1	2	45	175	180	1034	9th of 12, NA3HL	Did not qualify
2011–12	48	35	10	3	0	73	207	127	1526	1st of 4, East; 1st of 16, NA3HL	Won Div. Semifinals, 2–0 vs. Pittsburgh Jr. Penguins; Won Div. Finals, 2–0 vs. Cleveland Jr. Lumberjacks; 1–2–0 in Silver Cup Round Robin (W, 2–1 vs. Cherokee; L, 3–4 vs. Jr. Blues; L, 2–3 vs. Lumberjacks)
2012–13	48	27	17	2	2	58	168	141	1426	3rd of 6, East; 7th of 17, NA3HL	Won Div. Semifinals, 3–0 vs. Three Rivers Vengeance; 0–2–0 in Silver Cup Round Robin (L, 0–5 vs. Bulls; L, 2–5 vs. Lumberjacks)
2013–14	48	42	4	2	—	86	216	80	1080	1st of 6, East; 2nd of 21, NA3HL	Won Div. Semifinals, 2–0 vs. Metro Jets; Won Div. Finals, 2–0 vs. Cleveland Jr. Lumberjacks; 2–1–0 in Silver Cup Round Robin (W, 3–1 vs. Jr. Blues; W, 5–2 vs. Jr. Stars; L, 3–7 vs. Bulls); Lost Championship game, 0–3 vs. North Iowa Bulls
La Crosse Freeze
2014–15	47	28	14	5	—	61	160	155	913	3rd of 6, Central; 11th of 31, NA3HL	Lost Div. Semifinals, 0–2 vs. Wisconsin Whalers
2015–16	47	32	15	0	—	64	200	125	1161	2nd of 5, Central; 13th of 34, NA3HL	Won Div. Semifinals, 2–0 vs. Wisconsin Whalers; Lost Div. Finals, 0–2 vs. North Iowa Bulls
2016–17	47	23	22	2	—	48	199	169	1079	2nd of 5, Central; 27th of 48, NA3HL	Won Div. Semifinals, 2–1 vs. Wisconsin Whalers; Lost Div. Finals, 0–2 vs. North Iowa Bulls
2017–18	47	34	12	1	0	69	240	124	847	2nd of 5, Central; 10th of 42, NA3HL	Won Div. Semifinals, 2–0 vs. Wisconsin Whalers; Won Div. Finals, 2–0 vs. North Iowa Bulls; 2–1–0 in Fraser Cup round-robin Pool B (L, 1–4 vs. Jets; OTW, 3–2 vs. Brahmas; OTW, 4–3 vs. Stars); Lost Fraser Cup Semifinal game, 0–5 vs. St. Louis Jr. Blues
2018–19	47	36	9	1	1	74	340	98	745	1st of 7, Central; 7th of 36, NA3HL	Won Div. Semifinals, 2–1 vs. Peoria Mustangs; Lost Div. Finals, 0–2 vs. St. Louis Jr. Blues
2019–20	47	29	18	0	0	58	192	159	640	3rd of 6, Central; 13th of 34, NA3HL	Playoffs cancelled
