= Pittsburgh Vengeance =

- City: Harmar Township, Pennsylvania
- League: USPHL Premier
- Conference: Great Lakes
- Founded: 1997
- Home arena: Alpha Ice Complex
- Colors: Black, red, silver, white
- Owner(s): Glen Miske
- General manager: Dave Dorsey
- Head coach: Dave Dorsey

Franchise history
- 1997–2012: Pittsburgh Jr. Penguins
- 2012–2013: Three Rivers Vengeance
- 2013–2022: Pittsburgh Vengeance

The Pittsburgh Vengeance were a non-sanctioned junior ice hockey team and are members of the Great Lakes Conference in the United States Premier Hockey League's Premier Division. The team plays at the Alpha Ice Complex in Harmar Township, Pennsylvania, a township outside of Pittsburgh. In addition to the junior team, the organization also fields teams at the former Tier III Junior B/C levels and various youth levels of play. From 1997 until 2012, the team was known as the Pittsburgh Jr. Penguins. Some people find it odd that although the team is not located in Pittsburgh. They use the city’s name.

== History ==
The Pittsburgh Jr. Penguins entered the Metro Junior A Hockey League in 1997. After a good inaugural season including a playoff run, under head coach John Vivian, the league merged with the Ontario Provincial Junior A Hockey League. The Penguins opted not to join and entered the more local Empire Junior B Hockey League (EmJHL). In 2006, the Penguins fielded a second Junior B team in the Continental Hockey Association's Premier Junior B Division. In 2007, the Penguins created a third and fourth entry for the CHA's Major and Minor Junior C leagues. In 2009 the organization added a Tier III Junior A team that began play in Fall 2009 in the Central States Hockey League (CSHL). In 2010, the CSHL became the North American 3 Hockey League (NA3HL) after the Tier II North American Hockey League took control of the CSHL. In 2012, the team was rebranded the Three Rivers Vengeance for one season before it changed to the Pittsburgh Vengeance in 2013. The Vengeance left the NA3HL in 2018 for the Premier Division of the United States Premier Hockey League.

The Jr. Penguins fielded Junior B teams in CHA Premier (later called Eastern States Hockey League and the Empire Junior B Hockey League, and a Junior C team in the CHA Selects. In 2006, USA Hockey dropped the Junior C designation and those teams became Tier III Junior B. In 2011, USA Hockey dropped both the Junior A and B designations and called all the leagues as just Tier III, but since many organizations still fielded teams in the former lower leagues most were still referred to as their former designation.

== Season-by-season records ==
Flagship team's statistics.

Season	GP	W	L	T	OTL	Pts	GF	GA	Regular season finish	Playoffs
1997–98	50	21	26	3	—	45	168	240	9th Metro A	Lost in 1st round to Quinte Hawks
1998–99	28	19	9	0	—	38	156	112	3rd EmJHL	3rd in Championship round-robin (W, 5–2 vs. Jr. Stars; W, 8–4 vs. Blades; L, 4–0 vs. Jr. Americans)
1999–00	28	19	7	2	—	40	140	83	3rd EmJHL	3rd in Championship round-robin (L, 4–7 vs. Jr. Americans; W, 7–4 vs. Maple Leafs; L, 2–4 vs. Blades)
2000–01	30	21	8	1	—	43	193	98	2nd EmJHL	1st in Championship round-robin (W, 5–2 vs. Jr. Stars; L, 2–6 vs. Jr. Americans; W, 17–2 vs. Tornadoes); Lost Final game, 1–2 vs. Mass Maple Leafs
2001–02	36	20	14	2	—	42	204	126	6th EmJHL	Lost Second Round game vs. Binghamton Tornadoes
2002–03	32	20	9	3	—	43	195	101	2nd of 8, West; 4th of 12, EmJHL	4th in Championship round-robin (L, 2–5 vs. Jr. Stars; L, 0–6 vs. Apple Core; L, 5–6 vs. Tornadoes)
2003–04	38	30	6	2	—	62	204	107	2nd of 8, West; 2nd of 12, EmJHL	Lost Div. Semifinals, 0–2 vs. Connecticut Lazers
2004–05	44	29	12	3	—	61	211	129	3rd of 8, West; 5th of 16, EmJHL	Lost Div. Semifinals, 1–2 vs. Rochester Jr. Americans
2005–06	42	22	16	3	1	48	159	132	2nd of 4, West; 8th of 19, EmJHL	Won Div. Semifinals, 2–1 vs. Rochester Jr. Americans; Lost Div. Finals, 0–2 vs. Syracuse Jr. Stars
2006–07	38	32	6	0	0	64	195	86	1st of 5, West; 4th of 21, EmJHL	Won Div. Semifinals, 2–0 vs. Tri-State Selects; Won Div. Finals, 2-1 vs. Syracuse Jr. Stars; 4th in Championship round-robin (L, 2–3 vs. Jr. Monarchs; L, 3–6 vs. Apple Core; L, 1–3 vs. Jr. Bruins)
2007–08	44	32	9	3	0	67	194	110	2nd of 4, West; 4th of 19 EmJHL	Won Conf. Semifinals, 2–0 vs. Jersey Wildcats; 4th in Championship round-robin (L, 2–4 vs. Jr. Monarchs; L, 3–7 vs. Jr. Bruins; L, 1–2 vs. Jr. Stars)
2008–09	44	35	6	1	2	73	190	89	1st of 5, West; 2nd of 21, EmJHL	Lost in Final Four (L, 3–6 vs. Jr. Bruins; L, 1–2 vs. Jr. Monarchs)
2009–10	48	34	12	2	0	70	235	109	3rd of 13, CSHL	Won Round 1, 2–0 vs. Toledo Cherokee; 3rd in Hurster Cup round-robin (T, 2–2 vs. Thunderbirds; T, 0–0 vs. Jr. Lumberjacks; L, 2–5 vs. Jr. Blues)
2010–11	45	29	16	—	0	58	237	152	5th of 12, NA3HL	Lost Round 1, 0–2 vs. Chicago Hitmen
2011–12	48	26	19	—	3	55	188	165	4th of 4, East; 8th of 16, NA3HL	Lost Div. Semifinals, 0–2 vs. Flint Jr. Generals
2012–13	48	28	18	—	2	58	178	162	2nd of 6, East; 6th of 17, NA3HL	Lost Div. Semifinals, 0–3 vs. Flint Jr. Generals
2013–14	48	25	15	—	8	58	156	130	3rd of 6, East; 10th of 21, NA3HL	Lost Div. Semifinals, 0–2 vs. Cleveland Jr. Lumberjacks
2014–15	47	30	11	—	6	66	169	117	2nd of 6, East; 8th of 31, NA3HL	Won Div. Semifinals, 2–0 vs. Toledo Cherokee; Lost Div. Finals, 1–2 vs. Metro Jets
2015–16	47	19	25	—	3	41	132	157	5th of 6, East; 23rd of 34, NA3HL	Did not qualify
2016–17	47	28	16	—	3	59	159	120	2nd of 6, East; 14th of 48, NA3HL	Won Div. Semifinals, 2–1 vs. Toledo Cherokee; Lost Div. Finals, 1–2 vs. Metro Jets
2017–18	47	34	12	—	1	69	172	108	2nd of 6, East; 9th of 42, NA3HL	Won Div. Semifinals, 2–0 vs. Lansing Wolves; Lost Div. Finals, 0–2 vs. Metro Jets
2018–19	44	26	12	—	6	58	158	109	2nd of 6, Great Lakes; 16th of 52, USPHL Premier	Won Div. Nationals qualifiers, 2–0 vs. Metro Jets Development Program; 1–2–0 USPHL-Premier Nationals round-robin Pool B (W, 4–2 vs. Eels; L, 1–5 vs. Whalers; L, 1–2 vs. Stars)
2019–20	44	33	7	—	3	69	199	84	2nd of 6, Great Lakes; 6th of 52, USPHL Premier	Won Div. Nationals qualifiers, 2–0 vs. Toledo Cherokee; 1–0–0 USPHL-Premier Nationals round-robin Pool B (W, 5–1 vs. Pics; vs. Havoc; vs. Rush); Tournament cancelled due to COVID-19 pandemic
2020–21	43	30	11	—	2	62	155	100	3rd of 7, Great Lakes; 12th of 62, USPHL Premier	Won First Round, 2–0 vs. Wooster Oilers; Lost Div. Nationals qualifiers, 0–2 vs. Toledo Cherokee
2021–22	44	21	20	—	3	45	168	175	4th of 7, Great Lakes; 37th of 64, USPHL Premier	Won Div. Semifinal, 2–0 vs. Cincinnati Jr Cyclones; Lost Div. Final qualifier, 0–2 vs. Metro Jets
