= Granite City Lumberjacks =

- City: Sauk Rapids, Minnesota
- League: NA3HL
- Division: West
- Founded: 2007
- Home arena: Sports Arena East
- Colors: Red, blue, white
- General manager: Brad Willner
- Head coach: D.J. Vold
- Asst. coach: Dylan Borseth

Franchise history
- 2007–present: Granite City Lumberjacks

The Granite City Lumberjacks are a Tier III Junior A ice hockey team playing in the North American 3 Hockey League (NA3HL) and plays their home games at the Armadillo Deck Sports Arena, located in Sauk Rapids, Minnesota. The Lumberjacks play 48 regular season games, in addition to showcase and post-season tournament games.

== History ==
The team was founded in 2007 as a member of the Minnesota Junior Hockey League (MnJHL).

The Granite City Lumberjacks were the 2008–09 MnJHL regular season champions and qualified for the USA Hockey Tier III Jr. A National Championship Tournament, joining the 2009 playoff champions, the Minnesota Ice Hawks. The team won the MnJHL championship in the 2010–11 season with a 2-1 overtime win over the Rochester Ice Hawks.

In 2011, the Lumberjacks and MnJHL rival, the Minnesota Flying Aces, announced a move from the MnJHL to the NA3HL as part of the league's expansion to 16 teams for the 2011–12 season. The two teams joined two expansion teams, the Twin City Steel and North Iowa Bulls, to form the NA3HL West Division.

In the 2011–12 Season, the Lumberjacks claimed the West Division Title, West Division Playoff Title and the 2012 NA3HL Silver Cup Championship. However, they did not participate in the 2012 USA Hockey Tier III National Tournament.

The Lumberjacks would also win the 2015 Silver Cup Championship over the North Iowa Bulls. The Lumberjacks only qualified for the Silver Cup Tournament as wildcard after losing in the Divisional Finals to the Bulls. In 2017, the Lumberjacks won their third Silver Cup Championship with a 2–1 game against the Metro Jets.

== Season-by-season records ==
| Season | GP | W | L | OTL | Pts | GF | GA | Regular season finish | Playoffs |
|---|---|---|---|---|---|---|---|---|---|
Minnesota Junior Hockey League
| 2007–08 | No statistics available | | | | | | | | |
| 2008–09 | 48 | 41 | 5 | 2 | 84 | 238 | 109 | 1st, MnJHL | |
| 2009–10 | 50 | 36 | 12 | 2 | 74 | 258 | 121 | 2nd, MnJHL | Lost in Semifinals |
| 2010–11 | 45 | 36 | 8 | 1 | 73 | 215 | 100 | 1st, MnJHL | Bush Cup Champions |
North American 3 Hockey League
| 2011–12 | 48 | 33 | 11 | 4 | 70 | 199 | 106 | 1st of 4, West Div. 2nd of 16, NA3HL | Won Div. Semifinals, 2–0 vs. Minnesota Flying Aces; Won Div. Finals, 2–1 vs. North Iowa Bulls; Advance to Silver Cup; Won Silver Cup Championship |
| 2012–13 | 48 | 36 | 8 | 4 | 76 | 212 | 122 | 2nd of 6, West Div. 4th of 17, NA3HL | Won Div. Semifinals, 3–1 vs. Alexandria Blizzard; Won Div. finals, ?-? vs. unlisted Advance to Silver Cup |
| 2013–14 | 48 | 36 | 12 | 0 | 72 | 249 | 124 | 2nd of 6, West Div. 3rd of 21, NA3HL | Won Div. Semifinals, 2–1 vs. Alexandria Blizzard; Lost Div. Finals, 1–2 vs. North Iowa Bulls |
| 2014–15 | 47 | 33 | 9 | 5 | 71 | 197 | 113 | 2nd of 6, West Div. 4th of 31, NA3HL | Won Div. Semifinals, 2–1 vs. Alexandria Blizzard; Lost Div. Finals, 1–2 vs. North Iowa Bulls; Advance to Silver Cup (as wild card); Won Silver Cup Championship |
| 2015–16 | 47 | 33 | 11 | 3 | 69 | 196 | 112 | 1st of 5, West Div. 9th of 34, NA3HL | Won Div. Semifinals, 2–1 vs. Alexandria Blizzard; Lost Div. Finals, 0–2 vs.Twin City Steel |
| 2016–17 | 47 | 32 | 8 | 7 | 71 | 188 | 111 | 1st of 5, West Div. 11th of 48, NA3HL | Won Div. Semifinals, 2–0 vs. Breezy Point North Stars; Won Div. Finals, 2–1 vs. New Ulm Steel; Advance to Silver Cup; Won Silver Cup Championship |
| 2017–18 | 47 | 33 | 14 | 0 | 66 | 225 | 107 | 1st of 5, West Div. 12th of 42, NA3HL | Won Div. Semifinals, 2–0 vs. Willmar WarHawks; Won Div. Finals, 2–0 vs. New Ulm Steel; Advance to Fraser Cup |
| 2018–19 | 47 | 37 | 8 | 2 | 76 | 239 | 98 | 1st of 7, West Div. 6th of 36, NA3HL | Lost Div. Semifinals, 1–2 vs. Alexandria Blizzard |
| 2019–20 | 47 | 33 | 13 | 1 | 67 | 229 | 107 | 2nd of 6, West Div. 9th of 34, NA3HL | Playoffs cancelled |
| 2020–21 | 40 | 27 | 12 | 1 | 55 | 156 | 105 | 2nd of 5, West Div. 10th of 31, NA3HL | Lost Div. Semifinals, 0–2 vs. Willmar WarHawks |
| 2021–22 | 47 | 44 | 3 | 0 | 88 | 284 | 67 | 1st of 6, West Div. 2nd of 34, NA3HL | Won Div. Semifinals, 2–0 vs. Alexandria Blizzard; Won Div. Finals, 2–1 vs. Mason City Toros; Advance to Fraser Cup |
| 2022–23 | 47 | 39 | 6 | 2 | 80 | 233 | 111 | 1st of 6, West Div. 2nd of 34, NA3HL | Won Div. Semifinals, 2–0 Willmar WarHawks; Lost Div. Finals, 1-2 Alexandria Blizzard; Advance to Fraser Cup (Wild Card Qualifier); Fraser Cup Champions |
| 2023–24 | 47 | 36 | 9 | 2 | 74 | 244 | 104 | 1st of 6, West Div. 5th of 34, NA3HL | Won Div. Semifinals, 2-1 Mason City Toros; Won Div. Finals 2-0 Rochester Grizzlies; Advance to Fraser Cup |
| 2024–25 | 47 | 35 | 7 | 5 | 75 | 216 | 135 | 1st of 6, West Div. 5th of 35, NA3HL | Won Div. Semifinals, 2-0 Wilmar WarHawks; Won Div. Finals 2-0 Minnesota Moose; Advance to Fraser Cup |
| 2025–26 | 47 | 35 | 7 | 5 | 75 | 216 | 135 | 1st of 6, West Div. 3rd of 38, NA3HL | Won Div. Semifinals, 2-0 Wilmar WarHawks; Won Div. Finals 2-0 Minnesota Moose; Advance to Fraser Cup |

== USA Hockey Tier III Junior Hockey National Championship ==
| Year | Round Robin | Record | Standing | Semifinal Game | Championship Game |
|---|---|---|---|---|---|
| 2009 | T, 2–2 vs. Dubuque Thunderbirds (CSHL); W, 3–2 vs. Seattle Totems (NorPac); OTW, 6–5 vs. Northern Cyclones (AtJHL) | 2–0–1 | 2nd of 4 Div. II | L, 2–4 vs. New Hampshire Jr. Monarchs (EJHL) | — |
| 2011 | T, 4–4 vs. El Paso Rhinos (WSHL); W, 8–2 vs. Chicago Hitmen (NA3HL); L, 2–3 vs. Northern Cyclones (AtJHL) | 1–1–1 | 2nd of 4 Pool II | Did not advance | |
| 2015 | W, 3–1 vs. Dells Ducks (MnJHL); L, 3–6 vs. Northern Cyclones (EHL); W, 4–3 vs. North Iowa Bulls (NA3HL) | 2–1–0 | 3rd of 4 Div. 1 | Not played | Did not advance |

== NA3HL FRASER CUP Championship ==
| Year | Round Robin | Record | Place | Semifinal | Championship |
|---|---|---|---|---|---|
| 2012 | L, Jr Blues 1-2; W, Cherokee) 5-2; W, Chill) 3-2 | 2-1-0 | ?? of 4 Pool | No semis | W, St. Louis Jr. Blues 2-1; Silver Cup Champions |
| 2013 | W, Chill 5-2; OTL, Bulls 2-3 | 1-1-0 | ??? of 3 Pool | Did not advance | |
| 2015 | L, Bulls 4-7; W, Jr Predators 2-0; W, Jets 6-1 | 2-1-0 | ?? of 4 Pool | No semis | W, North Iowa Bulls 2-1; Silver Cup Champions |
| 2017 | L, Jets 0-3; W, Jr Blues 4-3; W, Capitals 6-2 | 2-1-0 | 2nd of 4 Pool B | W, Senators 3-2 | W, Metro Jets 2-1; Silver Cup Champions |
| 2018 | W, Senators 3-2; OTW, Jr Blues 3-2; OTL, Quake 1-2 | 2-0-1 | ?? of 4 Pool A | L, Metro Jets 2-3 | Did not advance |
| 2022 | L, Bighorns 0-2; W, El Paso Rhinos) 5-0 | 1-1-0 | 2nd of 3 Pool B | Won Semi Final, 4-3; Northeast Generals | L, Rochester Grizzlies 0-4 |
| 2023 | L, Blizzard 1-3; W, Jr. Brahmas 6-1 | 1-1-0 | 2nd of 3 Pool W | Won Semi Final, 4-2; Helena Bighorns | W, Blizzard 6-5; Fraser Cup Champions |
| 2024 | W, West Bend Powwer 4-2; W, Gillette Wild 6-1 | 2-0-0 | 1st of 3 Pool A | Lost, Semi Final, 1-2; Northeast Generals | Did not advance |
| 2025 | W, Louisiana Drillers 6-2; W, Binghamton Buzz 6-1 | 2-0-0 | 1st of 3 Pool B | L, Semi Final, 0-2; West Bend Power | Did not advance |
| 2026 | L, Jr. Brahmas 2-5; W, Long Beach Sharks 10-2 | 1-1-0 | 2nd of 3 Pool B | OTW, Semi Final, 5-4; Rochester Grizzlies | W, Finals, 4-0 Louisiana Drillers; Fraser Cup Champions {#2} |

== Alumni ==
The Lumberjacks have produced a number of alumni playing in higher levels of junior hockey, NCAA Division I, Division III, and ACHA college programs.
