= Nashville Junior Predators =

- City: Franklin, Tennessee
- League: NA3HL
- Division: Midwest
- Founded: 2014
- Home arena: Ford Ice Center
- Owner: TPH Nashville
- General manager: J.P. Dumont (2014–15)
- Head coach: Patrick Borer (2017–18)

The Nashville Junior Predators were a USA Hockey-sanctioned Tier III ice hockey team in the North American 3 Hockey League (NA3HL). The team played their home games at Ford Ice Center in Antioch, Tennessee, after spending their first two seasons at A-Game SportsPlex in Franklin, Tennessee. At the end of October 2017, Jr. Predators games were cancelled by the league before the team was eventually removed from the NA3HL at the end of November.

The players, ages 16–20, carried amateur status under Junior A guidelines and hoped to earn a spot on higher levels of junior ice hockey in the United States and Canada, Canadian major junior, collegiate, and eventually professional teams. The organization also fields teams at the pee wee, squirt, and midget levels of youth hockey.

== Season-by-season records ==
Season	GP	W	L	OTL	SOL	Pts	GF	GA	PIM	Regular season finish	Playoffs
2014–15	47	42	4	1	—	85	227	79	750	1st of 6, South Div. 1st of 31, NA3HL	Won Div. Semifinals, 2–1 vs. Point Mallard Ducks; Won Div. Finals, 2–0 vs. Texas Jr. Brahmas; 2–1–0, 3rd of 4 in Silver Cup Round Robin Pool A (OTW, 3–2 vs. Jets; L, 0–3 vs. Lumberjacks; W, 3–1 vs. Wolves)
2015–16	47	31	13	3	—	65	177	121	729	3rd of 5, Midwest Div. 11th of 34, NA3HL	Won Div. Semifinals, 2–0 vs. Peoria Mustangs; Lost Div. Finals, 1–2 vs. St. Louis Jr. Blues
2016–17	47	25	15	5	2	57	206	161	742	3rd of 5, Midwest Div. 18th of 48, NA3HL	Lost Div. Semifinals, 0–2 vs. Peoria Mustangs
2017–18	8	1	6	1	0	3	18	46	299	Folded midseason	
