= Lansing Wolves =

- City: Dimondale, Michigan
- League: USPHL Premier
- Conference: Great Lakes
- Founded: 2010
- Home arena: Summit Sports and Ice Complex
- Colors: Blue, silver, white
- Owner: Meijer Hockey

Franchise history
- 2010–2014: Battle Creek Jr. Revolution
- 2014–2017: West Michigan Wolves
- 2017–2020: Lansing Wolves

The Lansing Wolves were a junior ice hockey team and member of the United States Premier Hockey League (USPHL) as part of the Premier Division. The team played its home games at the Summit Sports and Ice Complex in Dimondale, Michigan, a suburb of Lansing. The franchise was previously a member of the North American 3 Hockey League (NA3HL) from 2010 to 2018 as the Battle Creek Jr. Revolution and the West Michigan Wolves.

== History ==
The team began as the Battle Creek Jr. Revolution in 2010 joining the independent Northern Junior Hockey League (NJHL) for the 2010–11 season. In August 2010, with rumors of the league folding, the Jr. Revolution left the NJHL and joined the USA Hockey-sanctioned Tier III Central States Hockey League. The Jr. Revolution replaced the Grand Rapids Owls, who suspended operations, as the 12th team in the Central States Hockey League. In November 2010, the CSHL changed its name to the North American 3 Hockey League after the Tier II North American Hockey League took over operations of the CSHL.

The team ownership was initially the Revolution Advertising LLC. until acquired by Dr. Joseph Burkhardt in 2014. On April 1, 2014, the team re-branded itself as the West Michigan Wolves.

In 2017, the franchise relocated the Lansing suburb of Dimondale, Michigan, and were renamed Lansing Wolves.

In 2018, the Wolves left the NA3HL for United States Premier Hockey League's Premier Division, a non-sanctioned league. During the COVID-19 pandemic, the Wolves were not listed as members of the USPHL prior to the 2020–21 season. In February 2021, their home arena in Dimondale, Summit Sports and Ice Complex, closed.

== Season-by-season records ==
Season	GP	W	L	OTL	SOL	Pts	GF	GA	Regular season finish	Playoffs
Battle Creek Jr. Revolution
2010–11	45	0	44	0	1	1	85	277	12th of 12, NA3HL	Did not qualify
2011–12	48	0	48	0	0	0	62	348	4th of 4, North; 16th of 16, NA3HL	Did not qualify
2012–13	48	7	38	1	2	17	106	259	5th of 5, Central; 16th of 17, NA3HL	Did not qualify
2013–14	48	1	47	0	—	2	53	341	6th of 6, Central; 21st of 21, NA3HL	Did not qualify
West Michigan Wolves
2014–15	47	31	15	1	—	63	152	128	1st of 6, Central; 10th of 31, NA3HL	Won Div. Semifinals, 2–1 vs. Peoria Mustangs; Won Div. Finals, 2–1 vs. Wisconsin Whalers; 1–2–0 in Silver Cup Round Robin (W, 3–1 vs. Americans; L, 0–2 vs. Bulls; L, 1–3 vs. Jr. Predators)
2015–16	47	26	17	4	—	56	170	161	3rd of 6, East; 17th of 34, NA3HL	Won Div. Semifinals, 2–0 vs. Toledo Cherokee; Lost Div. Finals, 0–2 vs. Metro Jets
2016–17	47	22	22	1	2	47	152	147	4th of 6, East; 29th of 48, NA3HL	Lost Div. Semifinals, 1–2 vs. Metro Jets
Lansing Wolves
2017–18	47	26	17	1	3	56	152	125	3rd of 6, East; 19th of 42, NA3HL	Lost Div. Semifinals, 0–2 vs. Pittsburgh Vengeance
2018–19	44	23	18	2	1	49	140	151	4th of 6, Great Lakes Div. 26th of 52, USPHL-Premier	Lost Div. Semifinal series, 0–2 (Metro Jets)
2019–20	44	14	27	2	1	31	123	198	5th of 6, Great Lakes Div. 39th of 52, USPHL-Premier	Lost Div. Semifinal series, 1–2 (Lake Erie Bighorns)
