= Oklahoma City Blazers =

Oklahoma City Blazers has been the name of multiple ice hockey franchises:

- Oklahoma City Blazers (1965–1977), a team which played in the Central Professional Hockey League from 1965 to 1977
- Oklahoma City Blazers (1992–2009), a team which played in the Central Hockey League from 1992 to 2009
- Oklahoma City Jr. Blazers, a team that played in the Western States Hockey League from 2014 to 2020; renamed to the Oklahoma City Ice Hawks in the North American 3 Hockey League in 2021.
