= Mason City Arena =

- Interactive map of Mason City Arena
- Location: 111 S. Washington Avenue; Mason City, IA, 50401
- Coordinates: 43.1503°N 93.2020°W
- Owner: Mason City Council
- Operator: Southbridge Mall
- Capacity: 4,200; 2,058 (ice hockey)

Construction
- Groundbreaking: February 2019
- Opened: 2019
- Cost: $18 million

Tenants
- North Iowa Bulls (NA3HL) (2019–2021, 2026–present); North Iowa Bulls (NAHL) (2021–2026)

The Mason City Arena is a multipurpose arena located in Mason City, Iowa featuring fixed seating for 2,058 for ice events and 4,200 for non-ice events. The arena is attached to the Southbridge Mall on the site of a former JCPenney department store.

== History ==
The Mason City Arena was constructed by renovating a vacant JCPenney department store in Southbridge Mall as part of the River City Renaissance Project, breaking ground in February 2019 and opening in late 2019. Designed by ICON Architectural Group, the $18 million project, led by Dean Snyder Construction, transformed the 52,500-square-foot store into a year-round multipurpose venue with fixed seating for 2,058 and capacity for 4,200 of attendees for concerts and other events. The Mason City Arena is currently the largest entertainment venue in North Iowa.

As of 2025, Mason City Arena is the home of the North Iowa Bulls NAHL Team, the Mason City Toros NA3HL team, Mason City Youth Hockey, Mohawk High School Hockey Team, and North Iowa Figure Skating Club. The Mason City Arena features an NHL sized ice rink (200' x 85') from September - May each year.

Besides ice events, the Arena also hosts concerts, MMA events, graduation, high school choir concerts, and National Night Out.
