= Sheridan Hawks =

- City: Sheridan, Wyoming
- League: North American 3 Hockey League
- Home arena: Sheridan Ice M&M's Center
- Colors: Blue, gold, white
- General manager: Brenton Milner
- Head coach: J.J. Santagata

Franchise history
- 2004–2007: Quad City Express
- 2007–2013: Quad City Jr. Flames
- 2013–2019: Wisconsin Whalers
- 2019–present: Sheridan Hawks

The Sheridan Hawks are a USA Hockey-sanctioned Tier III junior ice hockey team in the North American 3 Hockey League (NA3HL). The team plays home games at the Sheridan Ice M&M’s Center in Sheridan, Wyoming.

== History ==
The team previously played at The River's Edge Ice Arena in Davenport, Iowa, where it was known as the Quad City Express and the Quad City Jr. Flames. In May 2013, the team announced that the Quad City Jr. Flames were granted approval by the NA3HL Board of Governors and the USA Hockey Junior Council to relocate to Madison, Wisconsin, for the 2013–14 season and play out of Hartmeyer Ice Arena as the Wisconsin Whalers. The team began playing out of the Oregon Ice Arena in nearby Oregon, Wisconsin, in the 2015–16 season.

Following the 2018–19 season, the Whalers were sold to the Sheridan Hawks Junior Hockey Club, a 501(c)(3) nonprofit organization, based in Sheridan, Wyoming. The team was then branded as the Sheridan Hawks.

The players, ages 16–20, carried amateur status under Junior A guidelines and would hope to earn a spot on higher levels of junior ice hockey in the United States and Canada, collegiate, and eventually professional teams.

== Season-by-season records ==
Season	GP	W	L	OTL	SOL	Pts	GF	GA	PIM	Regular season finish	Playoffs
Quad City Express
2006–07	44	10	30	3	1	24	132	203	1339	6th of 7, West; 13th of 14, CSHL	Lost Divisional Series, 0–2 vs. St. Louis Jr. Blues
Quad City Jr. Flames
2007–08	48	17	26	2	3	39	194	233	1414	10th of 13, CSHL	Did not qualify
2008–09	45	23	19	2	1	49	167	149	965	7th of 12, CSHL	Lost Round 1, 0–2 vs. Toledo Cherokee
2009–10	48	25	20	0	3	53	174	157	929	8th of 13, CSHL	Lost Round 1, 0–2 vs. St. Louis Jr. Blues
2010–11	45	22	19	2	2	48	171	171	770	8th of 12, NA3HL	Won Round 1, 2–1 vs. St. Louis Jr. Blues; 0–3 in Hurster Cup Round Robin (L, 3–6 vs. Hitmen; L, 2–5 vs. Steam; OTL, 3–4 vs. Mustangs)
2011–12	48	14	28	3	3	34	128	167	895	4th of 4, Central Div. 14th of 16, NA3HL	Lost Div. Semifinals, 1–2 vs. St. Louis Jr. Blues
2012–13	48	8	38	1	1	18	83	222	825	4th of 5, Central Div. 15th of 17, NA3HL	Lost Div. Semifinals, 0–3 vs. St. Louis Jr. Blues
Wisconsin Whalers
2013–14	48	26	15	7	—	59	221	167	852	3rd of 6, Central Div. 9th of 21, NA3HL	Lost Div. Semifinals, 0–2 vs. St. Louis Jr. Blues
2014–15	47	29	13	5	—	63	186	128	683	2nd of 6, Central Div. 11th of 31, NA3HL	Won Div. Semifinals, 2–0 vs. La Crosse Freeze; Lost Div. Finals, 1–2 vs. West Michigan Wolves
2015–16	47	31	16	0	—	62	246	136	980	3rd of 5, Central Div. 16th of 34, NA3HL	Lost Div. Semifinals, 0–2 vs. La Crosse Freeze
2016–17	47	19	23	5	0	43	172	194	1165	3rd of 5, Central Div. 32nd of 48, NA3HL	Lost Div. Semifinals, 1–2 vs. La Crosse Freeze
2017–18	47	18	27	1	1	38	176	227	918	3rd of 5, Central Div. 29th of 42, NA3HL	Lost Div. Semifinals, 0–2 vs. La Crosse Freeze
2018–19	47	23	24	0	0	46	186	218	639	5th of 7, Central Div. 23rd of 36, NA3HL	Did not qualify
Sheridan Hawks
2019–20	47	35	10	1	1	72	250	118	1428	2nd of 8, Frontier Div. 6th of 34, NA3HL	Trailed Div. Semifinals, 0–1 vs. Great Falls Americans; Playoffs cancelled
2020–21	40	39	1	0	0	78	289	81	976	1st of 8, Frontier Div. 1st of 31, NA3HL	Won Div. Semifinals, 2–0 vs. Missoula Junior Bruins; Won Div. Finals, 2–1 vs. Great Falls Americans; 1–0–1 in Fraser Cup round-robin Pool A (W, 13–2 vs. Generals; OTL, 1–2 vs. Bulls); Lost Semifinal game, 1–7 vs. Rochester Grizzlies
2021–22	47	6	40	1	0	13	112	283	904	8th of 8, Frontier Div. 32nd of 34, NA3HL	Did not qualify
2022–23	47	27	18	2	0	56	206	209	1005	3rd of 8, Frontier Div. 14th of 34, NA3HL	Lost Div. Semifinals, 0-2 Gillette Wild
2023–24	47	19	24	2	2	42	158	198	888	6th of 8, Frontier Div. 24th of 34, NA3HL	Did Not Qualify
2024–25	47	28	15	3	1	60	212	133	560	2nd of 8, Frontier Div. 11th of 35, NA3HL	Lost Div. Semifinals, 1-2 (Great Falls Americans)
2025–26	47	33	8	2	1	69	204	91	791	1st of 8, Frontier Div. 5th of 38, NA3HL	Won Div. Semifinals, 2-0 (Badland Sabres); Lost Div Finals 1-2 (Helena Bighorns)

== Previous Logos ==
Jr. Flames logo

Whalers logo
