= Planet Ice Skating and Hockey Arena =

Recreational facility in Lafayette, Louisiana

Coordinates: 30°11′37″N 92°3′19″W

- Planet Ice
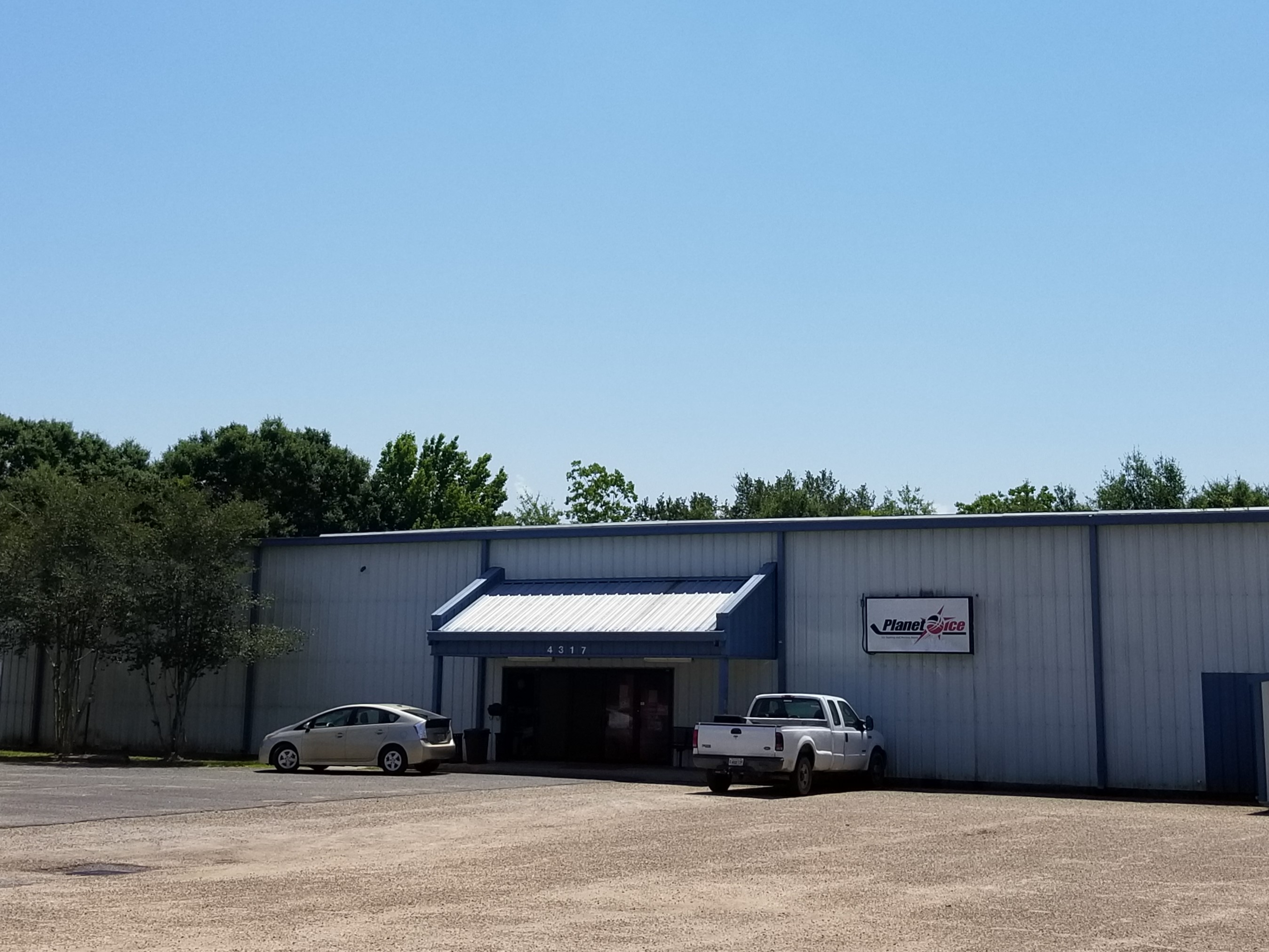
- Interactive map of Planet Ice Skating and Hockey Arena
- Location: 4317 Johnston St. Lafayette, LA 70503
- Surface: 200' x 85'(hockey)

Construction
- Opened: 2011

Tenants
- LSU Tigers men's hockey (SECHC) (2011–present); Louisiana Ragin' Cajuns men's hockey (2011–present); Louisiana Drillers (NA3HL) (2015–present)

The Planet Ice Skating and Hockey Arena or Planet Ice is a multi-purpose ice arena and recreational facility located in Lafayette, Louisiana.

== Hockey ==
It is the home game and practice rink for the college LSU Tigers men's hockey team of the South Eastern Collegiate Hockey Conference (SECHC) and the Louisiana Ragin' Cajuns men's hockey team.

Since 2015, the facility has also been the home venue for the Louisiana Drillers of the North American 3 Hockey League (NA3HL).
