= Fox Cities Forge =

- City: Appleton, Wisconsin
- League: North American 3 Hockey League
- Division: Central
- Founded: March 12, 2026
- Home arena: Appleton Family Ice Center
- Colors: Orange, light blue, dark blue, black
- Owners: Darrell LaCrosse; Jeff Lindemann; Mark Mazzoleni
- General manager: Chase Crawshaw
- Head coach: Logan Wilt
- Affiliates: Janesville Jets (NAHL)

Franchise history
- 2026–present: Fox Cities Forge

The Fox Cities Forge are a Tier III junior ice hockey team based in Appleton, Wisconsin. They are members of the Central Division of the North American 3 Hockey League (NA3HL).

== History ==
On March 12, 2026, the North American 3 Hockey League (NA3HL) announced that they had awarded a franchise to Appleton-based Fox Cities, LLC, to begin play in 2026. The team's home venue was announced as the Appleton Family Ice Center, a 1,200-seat arena and home to the hockey teams of Lawrence University. The team is owned by former Harvard and Green Bay Gamblers head coach Mark Mazzoleni, Neenah High School boys hockey coach Jeff Lindemann, and Darrell LaCrosse. On April 17, the team announced its name as the Fox Cities Forge.

On June 16, the Forge announced an affiliation agreement with the Janesville Jets of the tier II North American Hockey League. On June 24, the team was confirmed to be joining the Central Division.

== Season-by-season records ==
Season	GP	W	L	OTL	SOL	Pts	GF	GA	PIM	Regular season finish	Playoffs
Fox Cities Forge
2026–27										TBD, Central; TBD, NA3HL	
