= North American 3 Hockey League =

Tier III junior ice hockey league

NA3HL
- Current season, competition or edition: 2024–25 NA3HL season
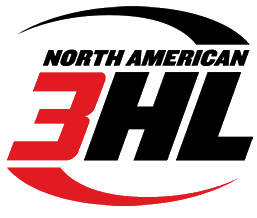
- Sport: Ice hockey
- Founded: 1970s
- No. of teams: 38
- Country: United States
- Most recent champion: Granite City Lumberjacks (2026)
- Website: www.na3hl.com

CSHL logo

The North American 3 Hockey League (NA3HL) is an American Tier III junior ice hockey league that consists of teams from Connecticut, Georgia, Illinois, Iowa, Louisiana, Maine, Massachusetts, Minnesota, Missouri, Montana, New Jersey, New Mexico, New York, Oklahoma, South Dakota, Texas, Wisconsin, and Wyoming. Sanctioned by USA Hockey, for most of the league's existence, the winner of the NA3HL playoffs would advance to play for the Tier III National Championship, however, this has not been held since 2015.

== History ==
Originally formed in the early 1970s as a Junior B-level league known as the Central States Hockey League (CSHL), the league evolved into the Metro Detroit Junior Hockey League in the early 1980s. The CSHL name was used again from 1994 until 2010. The league was reclassified from Tier III Junior B to Tier III Junior A in the summer of 2007 by USA Hockey.

During the 2008–09 season, it was announced that the Pittsburgh Jr. Penguins would join the CSHL for the 2009–10 season, bringing the number of teams to 13. The league returned to 12 teams for 2010–11, as the Dubuque Thunderbirds franchise folded to make way for the return of the Dubuque Fighting Saints in the United States Hockey League.

On November 1, 2010, it was announced that the North American Hockey League would take control of the CSHL. The NAHL-CSHL affiliation intends for a more structured junior hockey system to provide athletes with more opportunities to advance to college and professional hockey, including a draft of CSHL players into the NAHL. At the time of the take over, the league was renamed to the North American 3 Hockey League (NA3HL).

In May 2011, it was announced that the Granite City Lumberjacks, Minnesota Flying Aces, North Iowa Bulls and the Twin City Steel would join the league beginning with the 2011–12 season bringing the total number of teams in the NA3HL to 16.

In March 2013, the NA3HL announced that its Board of Governors has accepted the membership application for the Chicago Jr. Bulldogs, which began play in the NA3HL during the 2013–14 season. Owned by Ken Kestas, the Bulldogs played home games out of Canlan Ice Sports in Romeoville, Illinois.

Quad City Jr. Flames (Davenport, Iowa) relocated to Madison, Wisconsin, in May 2013 and were renamed the Wisconsin Whalers.

In May 2014, the Flint Jr. Generals were purchased and relocated to La Crosse, Wisconsin, and renamed the La Crosse Freeze. The NA3HL announced that the Texas Jr. Brahmas would transfer from the Western States Hockey League and join the South Division. The expansion Nashville Junior Predators and Point Mallard Ducks (Decatur, AL) also joined the South Division bringing its total up to six teams. The American West Hockey League moved to the NA3HL to form new Frontier Division. The Battle Creek Revolution announced it was re-branding as the West Michigan Wolves. The Michigan Mountain Cats were sold and relocated to Jamestown, NY, and called the Southern Tier Xpress.

In April 2015, the NA3HL announced an expansion team in Evansville, Indiana, called the Thunderbolts, to play in the South Division beginning in the 2015–16 season. On May 21–22 of 2015, two additional expansion teams were announced: Rochester Ice Hawks, a member of the former Minnesota Junior Hockey League, was added the West Division, and the Louisiana Drillers playing out of Lafayette, Louisiana was added to the South Division.

On March 4, 2016, it was formally announced that the North American Hockey League's other Tier III league, the North American 3 Eastern Hockey League (NA3EHL), would be added to the NA3HL beginning with the 2016–17 season. The former NA3EHL teams became two new divisions within the NA3HL. On May 21, 2016, the Missoula Bruins youth hockey organization from Missoula, Montana, announced it had been approved as an expansion team in the Frontier Division of the NA3HL. The Missoula Junior Bruins replaced the Missoula Maulers of the Western States Hockey League after arena negotiations with the Maulers' owner fell through.

Prior to the 2017–18 season, the Lockport Express relocated to become the Niagara Falls PowerHawks, the Syracuse Stampede relocated to become the Oswego Stampede, and the West Michigan Wolves relocated to become the Lansing Wolves. The Chicago Jr. Bulldogs, Euless Jr. Stars, and L/A Fighting Spirit franchises were sold; the Bulldogs were relocated as the Wausau RiverWolves, the Jr. Stars re-branded as the Mid-Cities Jr. Stars, and the Fighting Spirit re-branded as the Lewiston/Auburn Nordiques. The Cincinnati Thunder, which had already been playing out of Dayton, re-branded as the Dayton Falcons. The Butte Cobras, formerly of the Western States Hockey League (WSHL), purchased the Glacier Nationals franchise in order to join the NA3HL. The schedule was set with 47 teams, however, the Butte Cobras and Billings Bulls would both fold prior to playing a game, while the Dayton Falcons, Nashville Junior Predators, and Jersey Shore Wildcats were also removed from the schedules during the season.

In April 2018, the NA3HL announced the entire East Division had left the league including the reigning champions, the Metro Jets, and joined the United States Premier Hockey League (USPHL). The Butte Cobras were also announced as returning and the Point Mallard Ducks were purchased and relocated to become the Milwaukee Power.

In 2020, the WSHL's Oklahoma City Jr. Blazers purchased the dormant Coulee Region Chill franchise to join the league for 2020 and the El Paso Rhinos announced an agreement to add expansion teams to both the NA3HL in 2020 and the NAHL in 2021. The Coastal and Northeast divisions merged into a new East Division beginning with the 2020–21 season following several teams withdrawing.

In 2023, the New Ulm Steel moved to Tomah, Wisconsin, becoming the Wisconsin Woodsmen. With the moved, they were transferred from the West Division to the Central Division. They hired head coach Jon Vaillancourt. In their first season, they placed 4th and made the playoffs, playing the Wausau Cyclones. They got swept, 2-0.

In 2024, the Minnesota Loons were sold and moved to Eveleth, Minnesota, and went under the same umbrella as the NAHL's Minnesota Wilderness, taking the same name, logo, colors, and uniforms. Similarly, the Maine Nordiques of the NAHL added a NA3HL franchise as an expansion team. Also joining as an expansion team is the Tulsa Jr. Oilers.

== Alumni ==
Many prominent college and pro hockey players have played in the CSHL at one point in their careers, including 2007 Hobey Baker finalist Eric Ehn (Metro Jets), St. Louis Blues forward and 2010 and 2014 U.S. Olympian Paul Stastny (St. Louis Jr. Blues) and Chris Butler (St. Louis Jr. Blues), now in the St. Louis Blues' organization.

== Teams ==
- 1-6 Central Division
- 7-12 East Division
- 13-20 Frontier Division
- 21-26 South Division
- 27-32 Southeast Division
- 33-38 West Division
- 39-42 Future teams

Division	Team	Location	Arena	Founded	Joined
Central	Fox Cities Forge	Appleton, Wisconsin	Appleton Family Ice Center	2026	
Central	Peoria Mustangs	Peoria, Illinois	Owens Center	2000	
Central	Rochester Grizzlies	Rochester, Minnesota	Rochester Recreation Center	1996	2015
Central	St. Louis Jr. Blues	Affton, Missouri	Affton Ice Rink	1978	1987
Central	Wausau Cyclones	Wausau, Wisconsin	Marathon County Arena	2013	2017 (Note: As the Chicago Jr. Bulldogs.)
Central	West Bend Power	West Bend, Wisconsin	Kettle Moraine Ice Center	2014 (Note: As the Point Mallard Ducks.)	
Central	Wisconsin Woodsmen	Tomah, Wisconsin	Tomah Ice Center	2011 (Note: As Twin City Steel-2016 as New Ulm Steel)	
East	Garden City Gamblers	Brick Township, New Jersey	The Ice Palace	2026	
East	Long Beach Sharks	Long Beach, New York	Long Beach Ice Arena	2010	2016 (Note: Briefly joined as the New York Aviators.)
East	New Hampshire Jr. Mountain Kings	Hooksett, New Hampshire	Tri Town Ice Arena	2023	
East	New Jersey Titans	Middletown Township, New Jersey	Middletown Ice Arena	2008 (Note: As the New England Stars.)	2016
East	Norwich Sea Captains	Norwich, Connecticut	RoseGarden Ice Arena	2015	2016 (Note: As the Skylands Kings.)
Frontier	Badlands Sabres	Rapid City, South Dakota	Roosevelt Park Ice Arena	2016 (Note: As the Missoula Junior Bruins.)	
Frontier	Bozeman Icedogs	Bozeman, Montana	Haynes Pavilion	1996	2014
Frontier	Butte Irish	Butte, Montana	Butte Community Ice Center	2011	2014 (Note: The Butte Cobras bought the Glacier Nationals in 2017 to join the league.)
Frontier	Gillette Wild	Gillette, Wyoming	Campbell County Ice Arena	2011	2014
Frontier	Great Falls Americans	Great Falls, Montana	Great Falls Ice Plex	2011	2014
Frontier	Helena Bighorns	Helena, Montana	Helena Ice Arena	2004	2014
Frontier	Sheridan Hawks	Sheridan, Wyoming	Sheridan Ice M&M’s Center	2004 (Note: As the Quad City Express.)	
Frontier	Yellowstone Quake	Cody, Wyoming	Victor J. Riley Arena	2001	2014
South	Oklahoma City Warriors	Oklahoma City, Oklahoma	Blazers Ice Centre	2026	
South	New Mexico Ice Wolves	Albuquerque, New Mexico	Outpost Ice Arenas	1998 (Note: Franchise founded as the Flint Jr. Generals in the CSHL. The OKC Jr. Blazers/Ice Hawks organization was founded in 2014 and bought the franchise to join the NA3HL in 2020.)	
South	Phoenix Inferno	Phoenix, Arizona	Fire 'n' Ice Arena	2026	
South	Texas Jr. Brahmas	North Richland Hills, Texas	NYTEX Sports Centre	2010	2014
South	Tulsa Jr. Oilers	Tulsa, Oklahoma	WeStreet Ice Center	2024	
South	West Texas Wranglers	Amarillo, Texas	Amarillo Ice Ranch	2025	
Southeast	Atlanta Capitals	Duluth, Georgia	Atlanta IceForum	2013 (Note: As the Topeka Capitals.)	
Southeast	Austin Ice Bats	Cedar Park, Texas	Chaparral Ice at The Crossover	2021	
Southeast	Bayou State Rougarou	Monroe, Louisiana	Monroe Civic Center	2025	
Southeast	Louisiana Drillers	Lafayette, Louisiana	Planet Ice Skating and Hockey Arena	2015	
Southeast	Pelham Prowlers	Pelham, Alabama	Pelham Civic Center	2025	
Southeast	Texas RoadRunners	College Station, Texas	Spirit Ice Arena	2013 (Note: As the Sugar Land Imperials.)	
West	Alexandria Blizzard	Alexandria, Minnesota	Runestone Community Center	2012	
West	Granite City Lumberjacks	Sauk Rapids, Minnesota	Armadillo Deck Sports Arena	2007	2011
West	Minnesota Vulcans	Blaine, Minnesota	Fogerty Arena	2015 (Note: As the Evansville Jr. Thunderbolts via Oregon Tradesmen.)	
West	Minnesota Wilderness	Eveleth, Minnesota	Eveleth Hippodrome	2012 (Note: As the Breezy Point North Stars.)	
West	North Iowa Bulls	Mason City, Iowa	North Iowa Ice Arena	2011	
West	Willmar WarHawks	Willmar, Minnesota	Willmar Civic Center	2007	2011 (Note: As the Minnesota Flying Aces.)

=== Future teams ===
Team	Location	Arena	Founded	Joined
Fox Cities Forge	Appleton, Wisconsin	Appleton Family Ice Center	2026	
Garden City Gamblers	Brick Township, New Jersey	The Ice Palace	2026	
Oklahoma City Warriors	Oklahoma City, Oklahoma	Blazers Ice Centre	2026	
Phoenix Inferno	Phoenix, Arizona	Fire 'n' Ice Arena	2026	

== Champions ==
The league championship trophy is the Fraser Cup. It was originally called the Hurster Cup during the league's time as the Central States Hockey League. In 2012, the cup was then renamed to the Silver Cup. In 2017, the league again renamed the championship to the Fraser Cup after long-time NAHL, NA3HL, and NAPHL Director of Hockey Administration, Robert ‘Fraser’ Ritchie. The winner of the Cup typically receives a bid to compete in the USA Hockey Tier III junior hockey National Championship Tournament, however, the tournament has not been held since 2015.

Season	Playoffs winner	Nationals results					
Season	Playoffs winner	Tournament	Top qualifier results		Runner up qualifier results		
1988	St. Louis Jr. Blues	Jr. B					
1989	Lytes Rustlers	Jr. B					
1990	Metro Jets	Jr. B					
1991	Wayne Chiefs	Jr. B					
1992	Downriver Blades	Jr. B					
1993	Wayne Chiefs	Jr. B					
1994	St. Louis Jr. Blues	Jr. B					
1995	Toledo Cherokee	Jr. B					
1996	Motor City Chiefs	Jr. B					
1997	Toledo Cherokee	Jr. B					
1998	Motor City Chiefs	Jr. B	Toledo Cherokee won Jr. B National Championship				
1999	Toledo Cherokee	Jr. B					
2000	St. Louis Jr. Blues	Jr. B					
2001	Metro Jets	Jr. B					
2002	Metro Jets	Jr. B	Metro Jets won Tier III Jr. B National Championship				
2003	St. Louis Jr. Blues	Jr. B	St. Louis Jr. Blues lost Championship game to Phoenix Polar Bears				
2004	St. Louis Jr. Blues	Jr. B	St. Louis Jr. Blues won Tier III Jr. B National Championship				
2005	St. Louis Jr. Blues	Jr. B	St. Louis Jr. Blues won Tier III Jr. B National Championship				
2006	St. Louis Jr. Blues	Jr. B	St. Louis Jr. Blues; 3-0-0 in Round Robin, 1st of 4, Pool I Won Semifinal (6-2 vs. Twin Cities Northern Lights); Tier III Jr. B National Champions (5-4 vs. Toledo Cherokee)		Toledo Cherokee; 3-0-0 in Round Robin, 1st of 4, Pool III; Won Semifinal 3-2 vs. Minnesota Ice Hawks); Lost Championship game (4-5 vs. St. Louis Jr. Blues)		
2007	Dubuque Thunderbirds	Jr. B	Dubuque Thunderbirds; 2-1-0 in Round Robin, 1st of 4, Pool II; Lost Semifinal (0-3 vs. New Hampshire Jr. Monarchs)		St. Louis Jr. Blues; 2-1-0 in Round Robin, 2nd of 4, Pool I Won Semifinal (6-1 vs. Suffolk PAL); Tier III Jr. B National Champions (4-0 vs. New Hampshire Jr. Monarchs)		
2008	Dubuque Thunderbirds	Jr. A	Dubuque Thunderbirds; Eliminated 0-2-1 in Round Robin, 3rd of 4, Pool III		Cleveland Jr. Lumberjacks; Eliminated 0-3-0 in Round Robin, 4th of 4, Pool II		
2009	Dubuque Thunderbirds	Jr. A	Dubuque Thunderbirds; 2-0-1 in Round Robin, 1st of 4, Pool II; Lost Semifinal (1-5 vs. New Jersey Hitmen)		St. Louis Jr. Blues; Eliminated 0-2-1 in Round Robin, 3rd of 4, Pool III		
2010	St. Louis Jr. Blues	Jr. A	St. Louis Jr. Blues; 2-1-0 in Round Robin, 1st of 4, Pool III; Won Semifinal (2-1 vs. New Hampshire Jr. Monarchs); Tier III Jr. A National Champions (4-3 vs. South Shore Kings)		Dubuque Thunderbirds; Eliminated 2-1-0 in Round Robin, 2nd of 4, Pool I		
2011	Chicago Hitmen	Jr. A	Chicago Hitmen; Eliminated 0-2-1 in Round Robin, 4th of 4, Pool II		St. Louis Jr. Blues; Eliminated 2-1-0 in Round Robin, 2nd of 4, Pool I		
2012	Granite City Lumberjacks	Tier III	No representatives sent to tournament				
2013	North Iowa Bulls	Tier III	North Iowa Bulls; 3-0-0 in Round Robin, 1st of 4, American Div. Won Semifinal (3-2 vs. Helena Bighorns); Tier III National Champions (6-2 vs. Twin Cities Northern Lights)		No runner up teams in tournament for 2013		
2014	North Iowa Bulls	Tier III	North Iowa Bulls; 3-0-0 in Round Robin, 1st of 4, Pool C Won Semifinal (5-1 vs. Northern Cyclones); Lost Championship (1-4 vs. Boston Jr. Bruins)		Flint Jr. Generals; Eliminated 2-1-0 in Round Robin, 3rd of 4, Pool B		
2015	Granite City Lumberjacks	Division 1	Granite City Lumberjacks; Eliminated 2-1-0 in Round Robin, 3rd of 4		North Iowa Bulls; 2-1-0 in Round Robin, 2nd of 4 Tier III National Champions (2-1 vs. Northern Cyclones)		
2016	North Iowa Bulls	Tier III Nationals not held					
2017	Granite City Lumberjacks	Tier III Nationals not held					
2018	Metro Jets	Tier III Nationals not held					
2019	Texas Jr. Brahmas	Tier III Nationals not held					
2020	Not awarded	Tier III Nationals not held					
Season	CHAMPION	Fraser Cup Qualifiers					
Season	CHAMPION	Central Div	East Div	Frontier Div	South Div	West Div	Wildcard
2021	North Iowa Bulls	Rochester Grizzlies	Northeast Generals	Sheridan Hawks	Texas Brahmas	North Iowa Bulls	Oklahoma City Blazers
2022	Rochester Grizzlies	Rochester Grizzlies	Northeast Generals	Helena Bighorns	El Paso Rhinos	Granite City Lumberjacks	Gillette Wild
2023	Granite City Lumberjacks	Oregon Tradesman	Northeast Generals	Helena Bighorns	Texas Brahmas	Alexandria Blizzard	Granite City Lumberjacks
2024	Helena Bighorns	West Bend Power	Northeast Generals	Helena Bighorns	Louisiana Drillers	Granite City Lumberjacks	Gillette Wild
2025	Louisiana Drillers	West Bend Power	Binghamton Buzz	Helena Bighorns	Louisiana Drillers	Granite City Lumberjacks	New Mexico Ice Wolves
Season	CHAMPION	Central Div	East Div	Frontier Div	South Div	West Div	Southeast Div
2026	Granite City Lumberjacks	Rochester Grizzlies	Long Beach Sharks	Helena Bighorns	Texas Brahmas	Granite City Lumberjacks	Louisiana Drillers

== Former teams ==
- Battle Creek Jr. Revolution (Battle Creek, Michigan; 2010–2014). Joined as an expansion team in 2010 after initially planning on joining the Northern Junior Hockey League. Renamed West Michigan Wolves in 2014.
- Bay State Bobcats (Holyoke, Massachusetts) joined 2013 as the Barres-Wilkes Mines and joined NA3HL as the Binghamton Jr. Senators 2016[g] - replaced by New Hampshire Mountain Kings 2023
- Billings Bulls (Billings, Montana; 2014–2017). Joined from the American West Hockey League; ceased operations at the start of the 2017–18 season due to lack of players.
- Binghamton Buzz (Binghamton, New York) 2024-2026 No explanation - but not listed for 2026-27 season
- Binghamton Jr. Senators (Binghamton, New York; 2016–2019) Relocated after the 2018–19 season as the Elmira Jr. Soaring Eagles.
- Breezy Point North Stars (Breezy Point, Minnesota; 2012–2020). Not listed as a member after the 2019–20 season. Sold and reactivated as the Minnesota Loons in 2021.
- Butte Cobras (Butte, Montana). Organization joined from the Western States Hockey League after purchasing the Glacier Nationals NA3HL franchise in 2017. The Cobras failed to play a game and ceased operations during the opening weekend of the 2017–18 season due to lack of players. Returned to the NA3HL for the 2018–19 season. The Cobras were renamed as the Butte Irish prior to the 2023–24 season.
- Cape Cod Islanders (Falmouth, Massachusetts; 2016–2019) Franchise joined from the NA3EHL in 2016. Relocated as the Canton Cubs after the 2018–19 season but were removed from the league before playing in Canton.|
- Carolina Rage (Greer, South Carolina) 2025-26 -folded after one season

|-

- Chicago Force (Rolling Meadows, Illinois; 2004–2010). Organization obtained a Tier II North American Hockey League franchise and named it the Chicago Hitmen. The organization would also rename its Tier III CSHL franchise to match.
- Chicago Hitmen (Rolling Meadows, Illinois; 2010–2012). Organization ceased operations of both their Tier II and Tier III franchises prior to the 2012–13 season.
- Chicago Jr. Bulldogs (Romeoville, Illinois; 2013–2017). Franchise was sold and re-located to Wausau, Wisconsin, as the Wausau RiverWolves following the 2016–17 season.
- Cincinnati Cobras (Cincinnati, Ohio; 1999–2006). Renamed Cincinnati Jr. Cyclones.
- Cincinnati Jr. Cyclones (Cincinnati, Ohio; 2006–2007). Folded and replaced by Queen City Steam.
- Cincinnati Swords (Cincinnati, Ohio; 2013–2015). Renamed Cincinnati Thunder in 2015.
- Cincinnati Thunder (Cincinnati, Ohio, for 2015–16; Centerville, Ohio, for 2016–17). Renamed to Dayton Falcons when the team remained in the Dayton suburb of Centerville instead of returning to Cincinnati after the 2016–17 season.
- Cleveland Jr. Lumberjacks (Strongsville, Ohio; 2004–2015). Franchise purchased by the Wooster Oilers.
- College Station Spirit (College Station, Texas; 2016–2019). Became Texas RoadRunners.
- Columbus Crush (Columbus, Ohio; 1998–2003). Became Columbus Stars.
- Columbus Jr. "B" Blue Jackets (Columbus, Ohio; 2004–2007)
- Columbus Stars (Columbus, Ohio; 2003–2004). Became Jr. "B" Blue Jackets.
- Coulee Region Chill (La Crosse, Wisconsin; 2014–2020). Relocated to La Crosse as the Freeze in 2014; rebranded in 2018 taking its name from the former Coulee Region Chill of the NAHL; arena was closed and the team withdrew from NA3HL after the 2019–20 season. Franchise sold to the Oklahoma City Jr. Blazers, formerly of the Western States Hockey League, prior to the 2020–21 season.
- Danbury Colonials (Danbury, Connecticut; 2019–2020). Rebranded to Danbury Jr. Hat Tricks when the organization added an NAHL team in 2020 to match the professional team, the Danbury Hat Tricks.
- Danbury Jr. Hat Tricks (NA3HL) - 2019-2024 - retained their NAHL franchise
- Dayton Falcons (Centerville, Ohio; 2017). Folded after 12 games into the 2017–18 season.
- Dubuque Thunderbirds (Dubuque, Iowa; 2006–2010). Joined from the Minnesota Junior Hockey League. Ceased operations after they were replaced by a Tier I United States Hockey League team, the Dubuque Fighting Saints.
- East Coast Minutemen (Salem, New Hampshire; 2016–2017). Franchise joined from the NA3EHL in 2016; folded in 2017.
- Dallas Jr. Stars (Euless, Texas; 2013–2015). Renamed to Euless Junior Stars in 2015 by new owners.
- Elmira Jr. Soaring Eagles (Horseheads, New York; 2019–2020). Relocated after the 2019–20 season as the Bay State Bobcats.
- El Paso Rhinos (El Paso, Texas) 2006-2026 Feilding only a NAHL team 2026-27 season
- Euless Junior Stars (Euless, Texas; 2015–2017). Renamed to Mid-Cities Junior Stars in 2017 by new owners.
- Evansville Jr. Thunderbolts (Evansville, Indiana; 2015–2019). Franchise sold and re-activated as the Oregon Tradesmen in Oregon, Wisconsin, for the 2020–21 season. 2024 relocated to Blaine, Minnesota as the Minnesota Moose
- Flint Jr. Generals (Clayton Township, Michigan; 1998–2014). Sold and relocated to La Crosse, Wisconsin, and became the La Crosse Freeze.
- Glacier Nationals (Havre, Montana; 2014–2017). Joined from the American West Hockey League in 2014. Purchased and relocated to Butte, Montana, as the Butte Cobras, an organization that left the Western States Hockey League in 2017.
- Grand Rapids Owls (Byron Center, Michigan; 1993–2010). Suspended operations prior to the start of the 2010–11 season.
- Jersey Shore Wildcats (Wall Township, New Jersey; 2016–2017). Franchise joined from the NA3EHL in 2016; played the first 22 games into the 2017–18 season before being removed from the league.
- L/A Fighting Spirit (Lewiston, Maine; 2016–2017). Franchise joined from the NA3EHL in 2016. Sold and renamed Lewiston/Auburn Nordiques after one season.
- Lansing Wolves (Dimondale, Michigan; 2017–2018). Was previous known as the West Michigan Wolves. Left the NA3HL along with the entire East Division in 2018 to join the United States Premier Hockey League.
- Lewiston/Auburn Nordiques (Lewiston, Maine; 2017–2020). Ceased operations after the 2019–20 season.
- Lockport Express (Lockport, New York; 2016–2017). Franchise joined from the NA3EHL in 2016. Relocated to Niagara Falls, New York, as the Niagara Falls PowerHawks after one season in the NA3HL.
- Maine Nordiques (Auburn, Maine) 2024-2026 forced out of Lewiston for 25-26 season. Folded end of season.
- Maine Wild (Biddeford, Maine; 2016–2020). Franchise joined from the NA3EHL in 2016. Not listed as a member as of the 2020–21 season.
- Metro Jets (Fraser, Michigan; 1989–2018). Left the NA3HL along with the entire East Division in 2018 after winning the league championship. Joined the United States Premier Hockey League.
- Michigan Ice Dogs (Farmington Hills, Michigan; 2003–2008). Moved to the Great Lakes Junior Hockey League (2008–12), then the Midwest Junior Hockey League (2012–15), and then joined the USPHL-Midwest Division for 2015–16 as the Michigan Wild.
- Michigan Mountain Cats (Farmington Hills, Michigan; 2010–2014). Franchise sold and relocated to Jamestown, New York, as the Southern Tier Xpress
- Mid-Cities Junior Stars Euless, Texas - 2013-2024
- Milwaukee Power (Milwaukee, Wisconsin; 2018–2023). Organization was bought and moved to West Bend, Wisconsin, as the West Bend Power.
- Minnesota Flying Aces (Little Falls, Minnesota; 2011–2016). Joined from the Minnesota Junior Hockey League in 2011, franchise purchased and relocated to Willmar, Minnesota, in 2016.
- Missoula Junior Bruins (Missoula, Montana; 2016–2021). Replaced the Missoula Maulers of the Western States Hockey League in 2016; sold franchise in 2021 and was relocated to Rapid City, South Dakota, as the Badlands Sabres.
- Motor City Chiefs (Dearborn Heights, Michigan; 1985–2010). Franchise was sold and renamed Michigan Mountain Cats.
- Nashville Junior Predators (Franklin, Tennessee; 2014–2017). Games cancelled at the end of October during the 2017–18 season; removed from the league one month later.
- New England Knights (Raynham, Massachusetts; 2019–2020). After purchasing and relocating the Oswego Stampede franchise in 2019, the team was not listed as a member of the league for the 2020–21 season.
- New England Sharks (2020–2021). The Long Beach Sharks were temporarily renamed during the 2020–21 season.
- New England Stars (Tyngsboro, Massachusetts; 2016–2020). Franchise joined from the NA3EHL in 2016; franchise sold to the New Jersey Titans organization in 2020.
- New York Jr. Aviators (Brooklyn/Brewster, New York). Franchise joined from the NA3EHL in 2016. Relocated to Long Beach, New York, to become the Long Beach Sharks after joining the NA3HL.
- New Ulm Steel (New Ulm, Minnesota; 2016–2023). Bought and moved to Tomah, Wisconsin, as the Wisconsin Woodsmen.
- Niagara Falls PowerHawks (Niagara Falls, New York; 2017–2019) Relocated after the 2018–19 season as the Danbury Colonials.
- North Iowa Bulls (Mason City, Iowa; 2011–2021). Organization purchased a North American Hockey League (NAHL) franchise and promoted the Bulls to the NAHL; the NA3HL team was then rebranded as the Mason City Toros.
- Northeast Generals (2015-2025) Attleboro, Massachusetts Was the minor affiliate to the NAHL team by same name. NAHL Generals purchased the Bridgewater Bandits for affiliate to start of 2025-26 season.
- Oklahoma City Jr. Blazers (Edmond, Oklahoma; 2020–2021). Joined from the Western States Hockey League by purchasing the franchise used by the Coulee Region Chill; played most of the season as the "Oklahoma City Hockey Club" and had removed most of its branding; renamed as Oklahoma City Ice Hawks in 2021.
- Oklahoma City Ice Hawks (Edmond, Oklahoma; 2021–2022). Franchise was purchased by the New Mexico Ice Wolves NAHL team.
- Oregon Tradesmen Oregon, Wisconsin - 2020-24 (formerly Evansville) - re-located to Blaine Minnesota as Minnesota Moose.
- Oswego Stampede (Oswego, New York; 2017–2019). Franchise purchased and relocated to Raynham, Massachusetts, as the New England Knights.
- Pittsburgh Jr. Penguins (Harmarville, Pennsylvania; 2009–2012). The Pittsburgh Jr. Penguins organization created a Junior A level team to compete in the CSHL in 2009. Renamed to Three Rivers Vengeance in 2012.
- Pittsburgh Vengeance (Harmarville, Pennsylvania; 2012–2018). Left with the entire East Division in 2018 to join the United States Premier Hockey League.
- Point Mallard Ducks (Decatur, Alabama; 2014–2018). Expansion team for the 2014–15 season, sold and relocated as the Milwaukee Power.
- Quad City Express (Davenport, Iowa; 2004–2007). Renamed Jr. Flames after the American Hockey League team, the Quad City Flames.
- Quad City Jr. Flames (Davenport, Iowa; 2007–2013). Relocated to Madison, Wisconsin, and renamed to the Wisconsin Whalers.
- Queen City Steam (Cincinnati, Ohio; 2007–2013) Renamed Cincinnati Swords after the merger of two youth hockey programs in the Cincinnati area.
- Roc City Royals (Rochester, New York; 2016–2018). Team founded in 2014 in the North American 3 Eastern Hockey League and joined the NA3HL in 2016. Franchise was announced to be replaced by a team called the Rochester Riverman in 2018, but the Rivermen never played a game.
- Rochester Ice Hawks (Rochester, Minnesota; 2015–2018). Joined from the Minnesota Junior Hockey League in 2015. The franchise was purchased and became the Rochester Grizzlies in 2018.
- Skylands Kings (Stockholm, New Jersey; 2016–2020). Joined from the NA3EHL in 2016; not listed as a member after the 2019–20 season. Franchise membership purchased by the Norwich Sea Captains organization to join the league in 2021.
- Southern Tier Xpress (Jamestown, New York; 2014–2018). Formerly the Michigan Mountain Cats, left the NA3HL along with the entire East Division in 2018 to join the United States Premier Hockey League. Never played in the USPHL because they were replaced in their arena by the Jamestown Rebels of the Tier II North American Hockey League.
- Sugar Land Imperials (Sugar Land, Texas; 2013–2016). An expansion team from 2013, the franchise was purchased and relocated to College Station, Texas, and renamed College Station Spirit in 2016.
- Syracuse Stampede (Morrisville, New York; 2016–2017). Joined the NA3HL in 2016 from the NA3EHL. Relocated and rebranded to become the Oswego Stampede.
- Three Rivers Vengeance (Harmarville, Pennsylvania; 2012–2013). Renamed Pittsburgh Vengeance after one season.
- Toledo Cherokee (Toledo, Ohio; 1993–2018). Left the NA3HL along with the entire East Division in 2018 to join the United States Premier Hockey League.
- Topeka Capitals (Topeka, Kansas; 2013–2015). Franchise relocated to Sandy Springs, Georgia, and renamed to Atlanta Capitals in 2015.
- Twin City Steel (White Bear Lake, Minnesota; 2011–2016). Franchise relocated to New Ulm, Minnesota, and renamed New Ulm Steel in 2016.
- Wausau RiverWolves (Wausau, Wisconsin; 2017–2021). Sold and renamed the Wausau Cyclones.
- Wayne Wheels/Wheelers (Wayne, Michigan; 1998–2003). Renamed Michigan Ice Dogs.
- West Michigan Wolves (Battle Creek, Michigan; 2014–2017). Relocated to the Dimondale, Michigan in the Lansing-area and renamed Lansing Wolves.
- Wilkes-Barre/Scranton Miners (Wilkes-Barre, Pennsylvania). Franchise joined from the NA3EHL in 2016. Relocated to Binghamton, New York, to become the Binghamton Jr. Senators. after joining the NA3HL.
- Wisconsin Whalers (Madison/Oregon, Wisconsin; 2013–2019). Franchise played in Madison from 2013 to 2015 before moving to Oregon, Wisconsin. Sold and relocated to Sheridan, Wyoming, as the Sheridan Hawks.
- Wooster Oilers (Wooster, Ohio; 2015–2018). Joined from the Minnesota Junior Hockey League in 2015. Left along with the entire East Division in 2018 to join the United States Premier Hockey League.
