= Binghamton Buzz =

- City: Binghamton, New York
- League: North American 3 Hockey League
- Division: East
- Founded: 2024
- Home arena: The Ice Center
- Colors: Black, yellow and white
- Head coach: Gaetano Moirano
- Affiliates: Elmira Aviators

Franchise history
- 2024–2025: Binghamton Buzz
- 2025–2026: Buzz Hockey Club

Championships
- Division titles: 1: 2025

The Binghamton Buzz are a Tier III junior ice hockey team playing in the North American 3 Hockey League. The Buzz play their home games at The Ice Center in Binghamton, New York.

== History ==
On May 9, 2024, the NAHL approved the addition of the Binghamton Buzz as an expansion franchise to the league.

No definitive information on why the franchise was not listed on the 2026-27 NA3HL schedule.

== Season-by-season records ==
Season	GP	W	L	OTL	SOL	Pts	GF	GA	Regular season finish	Playoffs
2024–25	47	38	8	1	0	77	194	109	1st of 7, East Div. 4th of 35, NA3HL	Won Div. Semifinal series, 2–0 (New Hampshire Jr. Mountain Kings); Won Div. Finals series, 2–0 (Northeast Generals); Lost Pool B Round Robin Quarterfinal, 1–5 (Louisiana Drillers), 1–6 (Granite City Lumberjacks)
2025–26	47	22	21	4	0	48	148	158	3rd of 6, East Div. 21st of 38, NA3HL	Lost Div. Semifinal series, 0-2 (New Hampshire Jr. Mountain Kings)
