= Oklahoma City Ice Hawks =

Ice Hockey team from Edmond, Oklahoma

- City: Edmond, Oklahoma
- League: North American 3 Hockey League
- Division: South
- Founded: 2014 (organization); 1998 (current franchise)
- Home arena: Arctic Edge Ice Arena
- Colors: Black, red, yellow, white
- Owner: Jake Runey
- Website: www.okcicehawks.com

Franchise history
- WSHL franchise
- 2014–2020: Oklahoma City Jr. Blazers
- NA3HL franchise
- 1998–2014: Flint Jr. Generals
- 2014–2018: La Crosse Freeze
- 2018–2020: Coulee Region Chill
- 2020–2021: Oklahoma City Jr. Blazers
- 2021–2022: Oklahoma City Ice Hawks
- 2022–Present: New Mexico Ice Wolves

Championships
- Division titles: 1 (2015–16)

The Oklahoma City Ice Hawks, formerly the Oklahoma City Jr. Blazers, were a Tier III junior ice hockey team, based in Edmond, Oklahoma, in the Oklahoma City metropolitan area. The Ice Hawks competed in the USA Hockey-sanctioned North American 3 Hockey League (NA3HL) after playing as a member of the United Hockey Union-sanctioned Western States Hockey League (WSHL) from 2014 to 2020. Their home games were played at the Arctic Edge Ice Arena.

== History ==
Oklahoma City Blazers logo from 2014 to 2017.

The Jr. Blazers were announced in February 2014, founded by former Central Hockey League (CHL) Oklahoma City Blazers captain Tyler Fleck. The team began play in the 2014–15 season, playing in the United Hockey Union (UHU) junior Western States Hockey League with most of its home games at the Blazers Ice Centre.

On October 25, 2014, the Blazers set the WSHL's attendance record while playing at the Cox Convention Center in downtown Oklahoma City. The team defeated the Dallas Snipers in front of a crowd of 7,109 by a score of 8–3.

For the 2015–16 season, the WSHL announced that they would be playing under an UHU Tier II status. The Blazers hosted the 2016 WSHL All-Star Game, the first time that the league had held the event. The format for the 2016 All-Star Game featured the Blazers taking on a team of WSHL All-Stars.

On September 5, 2016, the United Hockey Union announced the formation of a new Tier I junior hockey league called the Central One Hockey League (C1HL). The league was announced to begin with the 2017–18 season. However, some of the announced C1HL teams backed out and the launch of the new league was initially postponed to the 2018–19 season.

After the 2016–17 season, Fleck sold the WSHL team to Gary Gill and Cole Hudek, with Gill set to be the head coach for the 2017–18 season. Fleck remained with the team as a consultant, but would focus on the promotion of the Blazers to the new C1HL in 2018, although there was never any mention of the C1HL afterwards.

After four seasons in the Blazers Ice Centre, the Jr. Blazers moved their home games to the Arctic Edge Ice Arena in nearby Edmond, Oklahoma, for the 2018–19 season with a few games at the Blazers Ice Centre.

In 2019, Gary Gill left the coaching position to become the associate head coach with the Columbus River Dragons in the Federal Hockey League and he named Ty Smith as the head coach for the 2019–20 season. On January 1, 2020, Gill relinquished his ownership stake in the franchise altogether and the WSHL took over operations of the team. Subsequently, the league named Rick Gowin as general manager and released head coach Ty Smith to replace him with assistant Daniel Armstrong. On January 27, the league announced Jake Runey as the new owner who released coach Armstrong after the season was cancelled.

Following the 2019–20 WSHL season, the team announced Josh Berge as the new head coach and general manager and that the team was joining North American 3 Hockey League (NA3HL) for the 2020–21 season. The WSHL then announced it would go dormant for the season one week later. During their first season in the NA3HL, the team removed most of the Jr. Blazers branding from the logos and uniforms, often simply using "Oklahoma City Hockey Club" in its communications. Before the 2021–22 season, the team was rebranded the Oklahoma City Ice Hawks as the new ownership were unable to acquire the "Blazers" name and other related trademarks from the owners of the former Oklahoma City Blazers that still owned the trademarks and hope to sell them a future professional team.

After the completion of the 2021-22 season, it was announced that the North American Hockey League's Wichita Falls Warriors would be relocating to Oklahoma City and the Blazers Ice Centre, beginning play as the Oklahoma Warriors in the 2022-23 season. Following the announcement of the New Mexico Ice Wolves NAHL team securing an NA3HL franchise, the Ice Wolves later confirmed the purchase of the franchise from the Ice Hawks.

== Season-by-season results ==
Season	GP	W	L	OTW	OTL	Pts	GF	GA	Standing	Playoffs
2014–15	46	34	12	—	0	68	224	158	2nd of 6, Midwest Div.	Div. Quarterfinals bye Won Div. Semifinals, 2–1 vs. Springfield Express; Lost Div. Finals, 1–2 vs. El Paso Rhinos
2015–16	52	42	8	—	2	86	274	147	1st of 6, Midwest Div.	Div. Quarterfinals bye Won Div. Semifinals, 2–1 vs. Springfield Express; Won Div. Finals, 2–0 vs. El Paso Rhinos; Lost Conf. Finals, 1–2 vs. Colorado Jr. Eagles
2016–17	52	37	14	—	1	75	276	145	2nd of 6, Midwest Div. 7th of 27, WSHL	Div. Quarterfinals bye Lost Div. Semifinals, 0–2 vs. Wichita Jr. Thunder
2017–18	51	42	7	—	2	86	379	106	2nd of 6, Midwest Div. 3rd of 23, WSHL	Won Div. Semifinals, 2–1 vs. Springfield Express; Lost Div. Finals, 0–2 vs. El Paso Rhinos; Advanced to Thorne Cup as El Paso is host 1–2–0, 5th of 6, Thorne Cup round-robin (L, 2–4 vs. IceCats; W, 4–3 vs. Rhinos; L, 3–5 vs. Mustangs)
2018–19	50	39	10	2	1	116 (Note: Beginning with the 2018–19 season, the WSHL awarded 3pts for a win, 2pts for an overtime win, and 1pt for an overtime loss.)	256	112	2nd of 5, Midwest Div. 5th of 23, WSHL	Won Div. Semifinals, 2–1 vs. Northern Colorado Eagles; Lost Div. Finals, 0–2 vs. El Paso Rhinos; 2–1–0–0, 4th of 6, Thorne Cup round-robin (as wildcard) (L, 2–4 vs. Mustangs; W, 6–4 vs. B. Blazers; W, 6–1 vs. Bombers); Lost Thorne Cup semifinal game, 2–7 vs. El Paso Rhinos
2019–20	51	20	26	1	4	66	192	179	5th of 6, Midwest Div. 14th of 20, WSHL	Did not qualify
2020–21	40	29	7	—	4	62	189	97	2nd of 7, South Div. 5th of 31, NA3HL	Won Div. Semifinals, 2–0 vs. El Paso Rhinos; Lost Div. Finals, 1–2 vs. Texas Jr. Brahmas; 1–1–0 in Fraser Cup round-robin Pool B (as wildcard) (L, 1–3 vs. Grizzlies; W, 5–1 vs. Jr. Brahmas); Lost Semifinal game, 1–2 vs. North Iowa Bulls
2021–22	47	33	23	—	2	68	286	158	2nd of 8, South Div. 8th of 34, NA3HL	Lost Div. Semifinals, 2–1 vs. El Paso Rhinos

== Team records ==
=== Single season ===
Goals: Ivan Bondarenko, 61 (2017–18)
Assists: Joshua Chamberlain, 73 (2017–18)
Points: Ivan Bondarenko, 126 (2017–18)
Penalty minutes: Michal Beranek, 205 (2015–16)
Wins: Bobby Cloutier, 31 (2017–18)
Shutouts: Bobby Cloutier, 7 (2017–18)
GAA: Xavier Garneau, 1.86 (2018–19)

=== Career ===
Career games: Drake Johnson, 190 (2014–18)
Career goals: Vitali Mikhailov, 114 (2016–19)
Career assists: Ivan Bondarenko, 126 (2016–18)
Career points: Ivan Bondarenko, 235 (2016–18)
Career penalty minutes: Kirill Romanov, 395 (2014–17)
Career wins: Bobby Cloutier, 49 (2017–19)
Career shutouts: Bobby Cloutier, 8 (2017–19)
