= Texas Jr. Brahmas =

Texas Junior Brahmas
- City: North Richland Hills, Texas
- League: NA3HL
- Division: South
- Founded: 2010
- Home arena: NYTEX Sports Centre
- Colors: Black, purple, white
- Owners: Dr. Salvatore Trazzera & Frank Trazzera
- General manager: Ryan Anderson
- Head coach: Nicholas Cammarata
- Affiliates: Lone Star Brahmas (NAHL)

Franchise history
- 2010–present: Texas Junior Brahmas

The Texas Junior Brahmas are a Tier III junior ice hockey team based in North Richland Hills, Texas, that plays in the North American 3 Hockey League (NA3HL) South Division. The team plays in the NYTEX Sports Centre and is owned by NYTEX Sports. NYTEX Sports also owns the NYTEX Sports Centre and the North American Hockey League's Lone Star Brahmas, with whom the Jr. Brahmas share the NYTEX Sports Centre.

== History ==
The Jr. Brahmas were founded in 2010 and played in the Western States Hockey League (WSHL) for four seasons. They advanced to the WSHL Thorne Cup finals after the 2013–14 season.

The Jr. Brahmas then joined the North American 3 Hockey League (NA3HL) prior to the 2014–15 season. As a member of the NA3HL, they have advanced to the Silver Cup round-robin in the 2015–16 season.

The organization also fields youth hockey teams at the Midget, Bantam, Peewee, and Squirt and other various levels as part of the Texas Brahmas Youth Hockey Association.

== Season-by-season records ==
Season	GP	W	L	OTL	SOL	Pts	GF	GA	PIM	Regular season finish	Playoffs
Western States Hockey League
2010–11	48	23	20	5	—	51	190	197		3rd of 5, Midwest; 6th of 13, WSHL	Lost Division Semifinals, 0–2 vs. Boulder Jr. Bison
2011–12	46	28	17	0	1	57	199	148	1276	3rd of 5, Midwest; 6th of 16, WSHL	Lost Division Semifinals, 1–2 vs. Dallas Ice Jets
2012–13	46	22	22	2	0	46	172	205	988	2nd of 5, Midwest; 12th of 22, WSHL	Won Division Semifinals, 2–0 vs. Dallas Snipers; Lost Division Finals, 0–2 vs. Dallas Ice Jets
2013–14	46	26	17	3	0	55	207	173	1150	3rd of 6, Midwest; 13th of 24, WSHL	Won Division Semifinals, 2–1 vs. Dallas Ice Jets; Lost Division Finals, 0–2 vs. El Paso Rhinos; Lost in Thorne Cup Finals round-robin tournament (L, 3–6 vs. Monsters; W, 3–2 vs. Mustangs; L, 3–9 vs. Rhinos)
North American 3 Hockey League
2014–15	47	26	15	6	—	58	179	138	516	3rd of 6, South; 15th of 31, NA3HL	Won Division Semifinals, 2–0 vs. Topeka Capitals; Lost Division Finals, 0–2 vs. Nashville Junior Predators
2015–16	47	35	9	3	—	73	231	88	522	2nd of 6, South; 5th of 34, NA3HL	Won Div. Semifinals, 2–1 vs. Atlanta Capitals; Lost Div. Finals, 0–2 vs. Point Mallard Ducks; 1–2–0 in Silver Cup Round-robin (as wild card) (L, 0–7 vs. Jets; W, 4–2 vs. Jr. Blues; L, 2–5 vs. Steel)
2016–17	47	37	9	1	0	75	184	83	522	1st of 6, South; 5th of 48, NA3HL	Won Div. Semifinals, 2–1 vs. Point Mallard Ducks; Lost Div. Finals, 0–2 vs. Atlanta Capitals
2017–18	47	40	7	0	0	80	239	76	887	1st of 6, South; 4th of 42, NA3HL	Won Div. Semifinals, 2–1 vs. Point Mallard Ducks; Won Div. Finals, 2–0 vs. Mid-Cities Junior Stars; 1–1–1 in Fraser Cup round-robin Pool B (W, 5–2 vs. Stars; OTL, 2–3 vs. Freeze; L, 1–4 vs. Jets)
2018–19	47	38	8	2	3	81	230	94	652	1st of 5, South; 3rd of 36, NA3HL	Won Div. Semifinals, 2–0 vs. Mid-Cities Junior Stars; Won Div. Finals, 2–0 vs. Atlanta Capitals; 2–0–0 in Fraser Cup round-robin (W, 6–1 vs. Jr. Senators; W, 3–1 vs. Jr. Blues); Won Semifinal game, 3–1 vs. North Iowa Bulls; Won Fraser Cup Final game, 2–1 vs. Lewiston/Auburn Nordiques
2019–20	47	40	5	2	0	82	231	81	839	1st of 5, South; 1st of 34, NA3HL	Playoffs cancelled
2020–21	40	34	5	0	1	69	189	70	943	1st of 7, South; 3rd of 31, NA3HL	Won Div. Semifinals, 2–0 vs. Atlanta Capitals; Won Div. Finals, 2–1 vs. Oklahoma City Jr. Blazers; Fraser Cup round-robin Pool B 0-2 (L, 3–4 vs. Grizzlies; L, 1–5 vs. Jr. Blazers)
2021–22	47	40	6	0	1	82	285	114	845	1st of 8, South; 5th of 34, NA3HL	Lost Div. Semifinals, 1-2 vs. Texas Roadrunners
2022–23	47	34	11	0	2	70	219	100	526	2nd of 8, South; 7th of 34, NA3HL	Won Div. Semifinals, 2-1 Louisiana Drillers; Won Div. Finals 2-0 New Mexico Ice Wolves; Fraser Cup round-robin Pool A (L, 1–4 Blizzard; L, 1–6 vs. Lumberjacks)
2023–24	47	28	13	3	3	62	198	98	765	4th of 8, South; 13th of 34, NA3HL	Lost Div. Semifinals, 0-2 New Mexico Ice Wolves
2024–25	47	34	11	2	0	70	216	100	963	3rd of 8, South; 7th of 35, NA3HL	Lost Div. Semifinals, 0-2 New Mexico Ice Wolves
2025–26	44	36	5	1	2	75	232	89	664	1st of 6, South; 3rd of 38, NA3HL	Won Div. Semifinals, 2-1 (New Mexico Ice Wolves); Won Div Finals 2-1 (Austin Ice Bats); Won Fraser Pool "B" 2-0 (W,5-2 (Granite City Lumberjacks); W, 6-3 (Long Beach Sharks); Lost Cup Semifinal Gm 0-4 (Louisiana Drillers)
