= Rochester Grizzlies =

- City: Rochester, Minnesota
- League: NA3HL
- Division: Central
- Founded: May 1996
- Home arena: Rochester Rec Center
- Colors: Black, gold, white
- Mascot: Boomer
- Owner: Brian Raduenz
- General manager: Tyler Veen (2023-present)
- Head coach: Tyler Veen (2023-present)
- Media: The Rochester Post-Bulletin, KTTC, KAAL
- Affiliates: Austin Bruins (NAHL)

Franchise history
- 1996–2009: Minnesota Ice Hawks
- 2009–2018: Rochester Ice Hawks
- 2018–present: Rochester Grizzlies

The Rochester Grizzlies (formerly the Rochester Ice Hawks) are a Tier III junior ice hockey team in the North American 3 Hockey League (NA3HL). The team plays their home games at the 2,600-seat Rochester Recreation Center, located in Rochester, Minnesota. The team typically plays more than 45 regular season games, in addition to showcase and postseason games.

== History ==
Rochester Ice Hawks logo

The franchise originally joined the Minnesota Junior Hockey League (MnJHL) in May 1996 as the Minnesota Ice Hawks and played in Le Sueur, Minnesota, until 2002. The team was owned and managed by Michael Fatis and coached by Nick Fatis (after previous seasons under Coach Josh Leal). The franchise moved to Rochester, Minnesota, in 2002 after the Rochester Mustangs of the United States Hockey League ceased operations. They officially changed their name prior to the 2009–10 season to the Rochester Ice Hawks.

Following the 2014–15 season, most of the active members of the Minnesota Junior Hockey League moved to the United States Premier Hockey League as part of a new Midwest Division. In May, the Ice Hawks were accepted as an expansion team into the North American 3 Hockey League (NA3HL) for the 2015–16 season.

In November 2016, head coach Nick Fatis, the second head coach (after Coach Josh Leal) in the history of the Ice Hawks franchise, stepped down for personal reasons. He was replaced by assistant Eric Hofmann. Hofmann was replaced by Chris Blaisius, formerly the head coach of the Willmar WarHawks, in December 2017.

After the completion of the 2017–18 season, Michael Fatis sold the franchise to the ownership of the Tier II North American Hockey League's Austin Bruins, consisting of Craig Patrick and Mike Cooper. The new ownership rebranded the franchise to match the Bruins and the team was changed to the Rochester Grizzlies. On April 23, they named Casey Mignone as the new head coach and general manager for the 2018–19 season. After one season, Mignone was hired as an assistant with the St. Cloud Blizzard in the NAHL and was replaced by Chris Ratzloff.

== Season-by-season records ==
Season	GP	W	L	T	OTL	Pts	GF	GA	Finish	Playoffs
Minnesota Junior Hockey League
1999–00	36	14	21	0	1	29	146	226	5th, MnJHL	
2000–01	36	12	24	—	0	24	130	229	5th, MnJHL	
2001–02	42	11	26	—	5	27	122	216	7th, MnJHL	
2002–03	42	15	23	—	4	34	163	195	5th, MnJHL	
2003–04	40	27	10	3	0	57	205	130	2nd, MnJHL	Nationals semifinalist
2004–05	48	36	7	4	1	77	261	124	1st, MnJHL	Won Bush Cup; Nationals appearance
2005–06	48	40	7	1	0	81	251	124	1st, MnJHL	Won Bush Cup; Nationals semifinalist
2006–07	40	32	4	2	2	68	259	110	1st, MnJHL	Won Bush Cup; Nationals appearance
2007–08	48	43	5	0	0	86	300	125	1st, MnJHL	Won Bush Cup; Nationals appearance
2008–09	48	41	7	0	0	82	330	100	2nd, MnJHL	Won Bush Cup; Nationals appearance
2009–10	50	41	8	0	1	83	288	138	1st, MnJHL	Won Bush Cup; Nationals semifinalist
2010–11	45	34	9	—	2	70	216	116	2nd, MnJHL	Nationals appearance (host)
2011–12	48	35	11	—	2	72	295	145	2nd, MnJHL	Nationals semifinalist
2012–13	50	42	5	—	3	87	338	128	2nd, MnJHL	Lost Division Semifinal
2013–14	46	22	17	—	7	51	194	181	5th, MnJHL	Lost Division Semifinal
2014–15	42	35	6	—	1	71	272	89	2nd, MnJHL	Won Div. Quarterfinals, 2–0 vs. Ironwood Fighting Yoopers; Won Div. Semifinals, 2–0 vs. Hudson Crusaders; Won Crossover Semifinals, 2–0 vs. Illiana Blackbirds; Lost League Finals, 1–2 vs. Dells Ducks
North American 3 Hockey League
2015–16	47	10	36	—	1	21	123	272	4th of 5, Central; 29th of 34, NA3HL	Lost Div. Semifinals, 0–2 vs. North Iowa Bulls
2016–17	47	10	36	—	1	21	101	250	4th of 5, Central; 44th of 48, NA3HL	Lost Div. Semifinals, 0–2 vs. North Iowa Bulls
2017–18	47	6	39	—	1	13	93	327	5th of 5, Central; 39th of 42, NA3HL	Did not qualify
2018–19	47	31	15	—	1	63	206	134	3rd of 7, West; 13th of 36, NA3HL	Lost Div. Semifinals, 1–2 vs. North Iowa Bulls
2019–20	47	37	8	—	2	76	233	94	1st of 6, Central; 5th of 34, NA3HL	Playoffs cancelled
2020–21	40	34	5	—	1	69	185	63	1st of 6, Central; 2nd of 31, NA3HL	Won Div. Semifinals, 2–0 vs. Oregon Tradesmen; Won Div. Finals, 2–1 vs. Peoria Mustangs; 2–0–0 in Fraser Cup round-robin Pool B (W, 4–3 vs. Jr. Brahmas; W, 3–1 vs. Jr. Blazers); Won Semifinal game, 7–1 vs. Sheridan Hawks; Lost Fraser Cup Championship game, 1–5 vs. North Iowa Bulls
2021–22	47	38	6	—	3	79	207	81	1st of 6, Central; 6th of 34, NA3HL	Won Div. Semifinals, 2-0 Wausau Cyclones; Won Div. Finals, 2-1Oregon Tradesmen; 1–1–0 in Fraser Cup round-robin Pool A (L, 2-5 vs. Generals; W, 4-2 vs. Wild); Won Semifinal game, 4–1 vs. Helena Bighorns; Won Fraser Cup Championship game, 4-0 vs. Granite City Lumberjacks; NA3HL CHAMPIONS
2022–23	47	33	9	—	5	71	191	107	1st of 6, Central; 6th of 34, NA3HL	Won Div. Semifinals, 2-1 Peoria Mustangs; Lost Div. Finals, 0-2 Oregon Tradesmen
2023–24	47	35	9	1	2	73	222	120	2nd of 6, West; 7th of 34, NA3HL	Won Div. Semifinals, 2-0 Alexandria Blizzard; Lost Div. Finals. 0-2 Granite City Lumberjacks
2024–25	47	28	14	3	2	61	179	139	3rd of 6, West; 10th of 35, NA3HL	Won Div. Semifinals, 2-1 Wausau Cyclones; Lost Div. Finals. 1-2 West Bend Power
2025–26	47	29	17	1	02	59	204	149	2nd of 6, West; 15th of 38, NA3HL	Won Div. Semifinals, 2-0 Wausau Cyclones; Won Div. Finals 2-1 West Bend Power; Won Pool "A" 2-0; Won Game 6-5 Helena Bighorns; Won Game 5-4 Louisiana drillers Lost Fraser Cup semifinal Granite City Lumberjacks
