= St. Louis Jr. Blues =

- City: St. Louis, Missouri
- League: NA3HL
- Founded: 1978
- Home arena: Affton Ice Rink
- Colors: Navy blue, white, and red
- Owner: Affton Hockey Club
- General manager: Scott Sanderson
- Head coach: Matt Ocello
- Media: NAHLTV.com

The St. Louis Jr. Blues are a Tier III ice hockey team in the North American 3 Hockey League (NA3HL). The team plays their home games at the Affton Ice Rink in Affton, Missouri, a suburb of St. Louis, Missouri.

== History ==
The team was formed in 1978 in the St. Louis Metro Junior B Hockey League by the St. Louis Blues president and general manager Emile Francis. In 1987, the Jr. Blues merged with the Affton Americans organization and competed in the North American Junior Hockey League, Junior B Division. The Jr. Blues competed in junior B division of USA Hockey's Tier III level. During this time, the team won the Jr. B National Championship in 2004, 2005, 2006, and 2007. In 2007, the Jr. Blues and their league, the Central States Hockey League, were promoted to Jr. A status. In 2010, the Jr. Blues won the Tier III Jr. A National Championship.

== Season-by-season records ==
Season	GP	W	L	OTL	SOL	Pts	GF	GA	Regular season finish	Playoffs
2014–15	47	13	30	4	—	30	131	228	6th of 6, Central Div. 25th of 31, NA3HL	Did not qualify
2015–16	47	35	8	4	—	74	262	129	1st of 5, Midwest Div. 3rd of 34, NA3HL	Won Div. Semifinals, 2–0 vs. Cincinnati Thunder; Won Div. Finals, 2–1 vs. Nashville Junior Predators; 1–2–0, 3rd of 4 in Silver Cup round-robin Pool B (W, 4–3 vs. Steel; L, 2–4 vs. Jr. Brahmas; L, 3–7 vs. Jets)
2016–17	47	36	9	0	2	74	324	122	1st of 5, Midwest Div. 6th of 48, NA3HL	Won Div. Semifinals, 2–0 vs. Cincinnati Thunder; Won Div. Finals, 2–1 vs. Peoria Mustangs; 1–2–0, 3rd of 4 in Silver Cup round-robin Pool A (W, 4–2 vs. Capitals; L, 3–4 vs. Lumberjacks; L, 3–5 vs. Jets)
2017–18	47	38	9	0	0	76	280	117	1st of 3, Midwest Div. 5th of 42, NA3HL	Div. Semifinals bye Won Div. Finals, 2–0 vs. Peoria Mustangs; 2–0–1 in Fraser Cup round-robin Pool A (W, 4–0 vs. Quake; OTL, 2–3 vs. Lumberjacks; W, 4–0 vs. Jr. Senators); Won Fraser Cup Semifinal game, 5–0 vs. LaCrosse Freeze; Lost Fraser Cup Final game, 2–3 vs. Metro Jets
2018–19	47	35	9	1	2	73	266	105	2nd of 7, Central Div. 8th of 36, NA3HL	Won Div. Semifinals, 2–0 vs. Milwaukee Power; Won Div. Finals, 2–0 vs. Coulee Region Chill; 1–1–0 in Fraser Cup round-robin (W, 6–2 vs. Jr. Senators; L, 1–3 vs. Jr. Brahmas); Lost Semifinal game, 2–3 (OT) vs. Lewiston/Auburn Nordiques
2019–20	47	29	17	0	1	59	189	123	2nd of 6, Central Div. 12th of 34, NA3HL	Playoffs cancelled
2020–21	40	21	16	3	0	45	130	113	3rd of 6, Central Div. 14th of 31, NA3HL	Lost Div. Semifinals, 0–2 vs. Peoria Mustangs
2021–22	47	6	38	1	2	15	85	251	6th of 6, Central Div. 31st of 34, NA3HL	Did not qualify
2022–23	47	8	39	0	0	16	103	296	6th of 6, Central Div. 32nd of 34, NA3HL	Did not qualify
2023–24	47	8	35	1	3	20	106	227	6th of 6, Central Div. 29th of 34, NA3HL	Did not qualify
2024–25	47	15	25	6	1	37	137	200	5th of 6, Central Div. 26th of 35, NA3HL	Did not qualify
2025–26	47	23	21	2	1	49	183	165	4th of 6, Central Div. 20th of 38, NA3HL	Lost Div Semifinals 0-2 West Bend Power

=== USA Hockey Tier III Junior A National Championships ===
Year	Round Robin	Record	Standing	Semifinal	Championship
2009	L, Minnesota Ice Hawks (MnJHL) 1–5; L, Jersey Hitmen (EJHL) 4–3; T, Phoenix Polar Bears (WSHL) 2–2	0–2–1	3rd of 4 Div. III	Did not advance	
2010	L, New York Bobcats (AtJHL) 3–4; W, Seattle Totems (NorPac) 10–3; W, Rochester Ice Hawks (MnJHL) 4–3	2–1–0	1st of 4 Div. III	W, New Hampshire Jr. Monarchs (EJHL) 2–1	W, South Shore Kings (EJHL) 4–3; National champions
2011	W, Hudson Crusaders (MnJHL) 10–2; W, Seattle Totems (NorPac) 4–3; L, Idaho Jr. Steelheads (WSHL) 1–6	2–1–0	2nd of 4 Pool I	Did not advance	

== Alumni ==
The Jr. Blues have had many alumni move on to, higher levels of junior ice hockey, NCAA Division I, Division III, ACHA College, at professional levels, including the NHL.

Notable alumni include:

- Chris Butler – St. Louis Blues (NHL), University of Denver (WCHA)
- Michael Davies – Bridgeport Sound Tigers (AHL), University of Wisconsin- Madison (WCHA)
- Cal Heeter – Ohio State University (CCHA), Philadelphia Flyers (NHL), Grand Rapids Griffins (AHL)
- Paul Stastny – St. Louis Blues (NHL), University of Denver (WCHA)
- Yan Stastny – St. Louis Blues (NHL)
- Travis Turnbull – Portland Pirates (AHL), University of Michigan (CCHA)
- Joe Vitale – Arizona Coyotes (NHL), Northeastern University (Hockey East)
- Sean Gammage – Pensacola Ice Flyers (ECHL), University of Wisconsin-Stevens Point
