= Dubuque Thunderbirds =

Former Tier III junior ice hockey team based in Iowa, USA

- Sport: Ice hockey
- Founded: 2001
- Folded: 2010
- League: MnJHL (2001-2006); CSHL (2006-2010)
- Location: Dubuque, Iowa, USA
- Arena: Five Flags Event Center
- League titles: 4

The Dubuque Thunderbirds were a Tier III junior ice hockey team based in Dubuque, Iowa that played in the multipurpose Five Flags Event Center from 2001 through 2010.

The Thunderbirds franchise was formed to fill a vacancy for Dubuque hockey fans after the original Dubuque Fighting Saints of the United States Hockey League relocated operations to Tulsa, Oklahoma as the Tulsa Crude.

The Dubuque Thunderbirds were a locally owned franchise that played in the Minnesota Junior Hockey League and the Central States Hockey League. The Thunderbirds played for 9 seasons in the Dubuque Five Flags Civic Center arena, often averaging crowds of between 1600 and 2400, which far surpassed all of the teams in both leagues. After the departure of the Fighting Saints, it took only a few short weeks for the upstart Thunderbirds to start finding success, which would follow the franchise its entire existence; winning 4 league playoff titles, twice finishing as league playoff runner-up, and 7 invitations to the USA Junior Hockey National Tournament.

== Dubuque Thunderbirds in the Minnesota Junior Hockey League (MnJHL) ==
2001-02 (30-11-1)
3rd place in MnJHL

- League attendance records of 25,000+ fans
- 13 game & 10 game winning streaks

Quarterfinals (best of 3): 2-0 (W) vs St. Paul Lakers (St. Paul, MN)
Semifinals (best of 3 ): 1-2 (L) vs NW Wisconsin Knights (Spooner, WI)

2002-03 ( 30-10-2 )
2nd place in MnJHL
Quarterfinals: bye
Semifinals (best of 3): 2-0 (W) vs NW Wisconsin Knights (Spooner, WI)
Bush Cup Finals (best of 3): 0-2 (L) vs Twin Cities Northern Lights (Bloomington, MN)
USA Jr. C National Tournament Qualifier

2003-04 (30-6-3-1)
1st place in MnJHL
Quarterfinals: bye
Semifinals (best of 3): 3-0 (W) vs Twin cities Northern Lights (Bloomington, MN)
Bush Cup Finals (best of 3): 2-1 (W) vs Minnesota Ice Hawks (Rochester, MN)
USA Jr. C National Tournament Qualifier - National Semifinalist

2004-05 ( - - - )
__ place in MnJHL
Quarterfinals:
Semifinals:
USA Jr. C National Tournament Qualifier

2005-06 ( - - - )
__ place in MnJHL

== Dubuque Thunderbirds in the Central States Hockey League (CSHL) ==
The Thunderbirds moved to the Central States Hockey League (CSHL) in 2006 (Junior B). In 2007, the entire CSHL was promoted to Junior A status. During their four years in the CSHL, the Dubuque Thunderbirds shattered individual franchise attendance records for the league, often recording close to four times the number of fans at home games than the second highest team. Because of their success on the ice and getting fans into the seats, the CSHL twice awarded the city of Dubuque the opportunity to host the entire Hurster Cup playoff tournament (2008 & 2009), with local hockey fans filling the seats to support teams throughout the tournaments in games that did not even feature the home team.

The Thunderbirds were incredibly successful in the CSHL. They compiled a 151-26-4-5 record, which would be the best in the league during their tenure, winning the Hurster Cup Playoff Championship three times in four years, and receiving four consecutive invites to the USA Junior National Tournament.

2006-07 (34-6-3-2)
2nd place in CSHL

- Home Attendance - 24,913 (13 other CSHL teams combined 39,208)

2007 Hurster Cup Playoff Champions
USA Jr. B National Tournament Qualifier

2007-08 (43-3-1-1)
1st Place in CSHL

- Home Attendance - 32,960 (12 other CSHL teams combined 48,323)

2008 Hurster Cup Champions
USA Jr. A National Tournament Qualifier

2008-09 (36-8-0-1)
3rd place in CSHL

- Home Attendance - 32,082 (11 other CSHL teams combined 43,488)

2009 Hurster Cup Champions
USA Jr. A National Tournament Qualifier

2009-10 (38-9-0-1)
2nd place in CSHL

- Home Attendance - 32,962 (12 other CSHL teams combined 42,518)

2010 Hurster Cup Runner-up
USA Jr. A National Tournament Qualifier

== Return of the Dubuque Fighting Saints ==
During the 2009-10 season, with a new 3,000+ seat ice arena in Dubuque under construction, it was announced that the Thunderbirds ownership group would dissolve the Dubuque Thunderbirds hockey franchise as they added several key partners to form a new ownership group, Northern Lights Hockey Foundation, in a bid to get a USHL expansion team. The Dubuque Fighting Saints returned to USHL play in the new Mystique Community Ice Center in the fall of 2010.
