= Houston Bulls =

- City: Richmond, Texas
- League: North American Hockey League
- Division: Central
- Founded: 2008
- Home arena: Deep South Ice & Sports Center
- Colors: Maroon, blue, white
- Owners: Alberto Fernandez, F&S Management
- General manager: Nick Fabrizio (2024–25)
- Head coach: Nathan Oystrick (2026–27)
- Affiliates: Mason City Toros, Lincoln Stars
- Website: houstonbullsnahl.com

Franchise history
- 2008–2010: Albert Lea Thunder
- 2010–2021: Amarillo Bulls
- 2021–2026: North Iowa Bulls
- 2026–present: Houston Bulls

The Houston Bulls are a Tier II junior ice hockey team in the North American Hockey League (NAHL). They play their home games in Houston. The organization also operates a Tier III junior team in the North American 3 Hockey League (NA3HL) that was known as the North Iowa Bulls from 2011 to 2021 before the club relocated from Amarillo, Texas. The Bulls were coached by Todd Sanden, who has been with the North Iowa team since its inception in 2011. The Bulls are now coached by Nathan Oystrick. The team moved to Houston in 2026.

== History ==
In 2019, owners of the North Iowa Bulls, F&S Management Company LLC, acquired the Amarillo Bulls of the North American Hockey League (NAHL) and the North Iowa Bulls gained a Tier II affiliation. On March 5, 2021, it was announced that the Amarillo team would relocate to Mason City starting in the 2021–22 season as the North Iowa Bulls. Todd Sanden remained the head coach and general manager of the North Iowa Bulls after joining the NAHL. On March 18, 2026, it was announced that the North Iowa Bulls would relocate to Houston, Texas, becoming the Houston Bulls beginning in the 2026-27 season.

== Season-by-season records ==
Season	GP	W	L	OTL	SOL	PTS	GF	GA	PIM	Regular season finish	Playoffs
2021–22	60	22	28	10	2	54	194	234	857	6th of 6, Central; 25th of 29, NAHL	Did not qualify
2022–23	60	29	27	4	2	62	167	179	647	6th of 6, Central; 23rd of 29, NAHL	Did not qualify
2023–24	59	11	46	2	2	24	108	259	1403	6th of 6, Central; 32nd of 32, NAHL	Did not qualify
2024–25	59	19	34	4	2	44	159	212	973	7th of 8, Central; 32nd of 35, NAHL	Did not qualify

== Alumni ==
The Bulls have advanced a number of players on to higher levels of junior hockey including the North American Hockey League, as well as NCAA Division I, NCAA Division III and ACHA college programs.

=== Division I ===
- Adam Carlson (2012–13); Mercyhurst University
- Aaron Davis (2012–13); Lake Superior State University
- Dominik Florian (2013–14); American International College
- Greg Ogard (2011–12); University of Denver
- Kohei Sato (2014–16); University of New Hampshire
- Jeff Solow (2015–16); Merrimack College
- Josh Benson (2016–17); Sacred Heart University
- Seth Eisele (2016–17); Lake Superior State University
