= Peoria Mustangs =

- City: Peoria, Illinois
- League: NA3HL
- Founded: 2000
- Home arena: Owens Center
- Colors: Navy, white, light tan, light blue
- Owners: <!Steve Ortman, Jean-Guy Trudel, Jason & Becki Walley-->
- General manager: Blake Ortman (2024-present)
- Head coach: Luke Gruden (2025–26)

Franchise history
- 2000–present: Peoria Mustangs

The Peoria Mustangs are a USA Hockey-sanctioned Tier III ice hockey team in the North American 3 Hockey League (NA3HL). The team plays their home games at the Owens Center in Peoria, Illinois. The players, ages 16–20, carry amateur status under Junior A guidelines and hope to earn a spot on higher levels of junior ice hockey in the United States and Canada, Canadian major junior, collegiate, and eventually professional teams.

== Alumni ==
The Mustangs have had many alumni move on to higher levels of junior ice hockey, NCAA Division I and Division III, ACHA college, and at professional levels, including:

- Logan Bittle - Bloomington PrairieThunder (IHL), US National Under 18 Team
- Aaron Dawson - Carolina Hurricanes 2003 NHL entry draft, Idaho Steelheads (ECHL)

== Season-by-season records ==
Season	GP	W	L	OTL	SOL	Pts	GF	GA	Regular season finish	Playoffs
Previous seasons not recorded
2024–25	47	12	35	0	0	24	139	260	6th of 6, Central Div. 31st of 35, NA3HL	Did not qualify
2025–26	47	7	32	2	0	16	138	280	6th of 6, Central Div. 36st of 38, NA3HL	Did not qualify
