= Maine Moose =

- City: Hallowell, Maine (2006–2014)
- League: NSHL
- Division: East
- Founded: 2006
- Home arena: Bank of Maine Ice Vault
- Colors: Black, gold, white
- Website: Maine Timberwolves Website

Franchise history
- 2006–2014: Maine Moose
- never played: Maine Timberwolves

The Maine Moose were a Tier III Junior "A" ice hockey team from Hallowell, Maine in the AAU-sanctioned Northern States Junior Hockey League. They played home games in at the Bank of Maine Ice Vault in Hallowell, Maine. The organization continued to operate several youth teams.

== History ==
Logo for the Maine Timberwolves

The team was founded in 2006 by local businessmen Steve Levesque and Tom McBrierty. Originally slated to play in the America East Hockey League the league folded prior to the start of the first campaign and was reformed by remaining teams into the International Junior Hockey League where the Moose played in the New England Division of the Super Elite League.

The inaugural season (2006–07) for the Maine Moose was led by head coach Paul Contreras. Amidst the early season struggles and some off-ice issues, Contreras was let go in mid-October. Assistant coach Glenn Carey took over as interim head coach and the team responded by winning eight straight games finishing the regular season in third place in the standings (although they were awarded the second seed as the Montreal team was not able to meet its financial obligations and was removed prior to the playoffs). The Moose made it to the finals but lost to the Springfield Pics by a score of 6–2.

In 2007–08, the Moose struggled to .500 record. Several mid-season departures left the roster depleted and many games were played with less than four full lines for the remainder of the year. The Moose finished the season in third place but were ousted in two games by the Exeter Freeze.

In 2008–09, Ben Gray was hired as co-coach along with Glenn Carey, and the team had its strongest regular season. Despite a slow start to the first six games, the Moose would be one of the league's best teams for the rest of the season. Led by the line of Jamie Osbourne, Blaine Cardali and Dan Dearing, with converted forward Andy Harrington on defense and a strong goalie tandem in nets made up of Charles White and Zack Parent, the Moose missed out on the regular season title by two points to the New England Stars. They would go on to play the Stars in the finals, but the best-of-three series would be won by the Stars on a game three win. After the completion of the season, it was announced that coach Glenn Carey would be leaving the organization to take over the coaching duties of the New Jersey Kings in Monmouth, New Jersey.

Chad Foye and Ben Gray co-coached the Moose in 2009–10.

The team was sold in 2010, and did not play in the 2010–11 season. The team's home rink collapsed in March 2011, and therefore did not play in the 2011–12 season. The team announced in 2012, that former Lewiston Maineiacs coach Jeff Guay had been named as the new head coach. The Moose played their first home game in two years on October 19, 2012, as an independent team affiliated with the Northern States Junior Hockey League (NSHL). It joined the NSHL as a full member for the 2013–14 season.

The team was co-owned by Ben Gray and Charlie Davis. The Maine Moose also operate Peewee, Bantam, U16 Midget, and U18 Midget youth hockey teams. In 2011, the Maine Moose U18 Midget team won the state championship, beating the previous season's champions Lewiston Gladiators 3-0.

In spring 2014, the Maine Moose junior franchise was sold to Jeff Dupere and renamed the Maine Timberwolves as well as a relocation to Lewiston, Maine, to play in the Androscoggin Bank Colisée. Their logo is exactly like that of the NBA's Minnesota Timberwolves, with "Minnesota" replaced with "Maine" and "Hockey" underneath.

On September 17, 2014, the NSHL suspended the Timberwolves operations indefinitely for failure to meet financial obligations prior to ever playing a game.

== Season-by-season records ==
Season		W	L	T	PTS	GF	GA	Finish	Playoffs
2006–07	52	32	15	7	71			1st	Lost in finals
2007–08	50	27	20	3	55			3rd	Eliminated in first round
2008–09	52	38	11	3	81	152	125	2nd	Lost in finals
2009–10	45	27	15	3	57	175	144	5th	Eliminated in first round
2012–13	Played as an independent								
2013–14	40	8	31	1	17	118	226	8th of 8	Did not qualify

== Arena ==
The Moose played home games at the Bank of Maine Ice Vault located in Hallowell, Maine, which opened in 2012. They previously played in the Kennebec Ice Arena, which was originally built in 1973 on the same site. It was destroyed after a roof collapse on March 2, 2011.

== Coaches ==
- 2006 Paul H. Contreras
- 2006–2009 Glenn Carey
- 2009–2010 Chad Foye
- 2010–2012 seasons not played
- 2012–2014 Jeff Guay
- 2014–suspension Jeff Dupere
