= New York Jr. Aviators =

- City: Brooklyn, New York
- League: North American 3 Eastern Hockey League (NA3EHL)
- Founded: 2010
- Home arena: Aviator Sports & Events Center
- Colors: Red, black, gray

Franchise history
- 2010–2016: New York Jr. Aviators
- 2016–present: Long Beach Sharks

Championships
- League champions: 1: 2015

The New York Jr. Aviators were a Tier III junior ice hockey team last playing in the North American 3 Eastern Hockey League. The Aviators play their home games at the Aviator Sports & Events Center in Brooklyn, New York.

== History ==
The New York Jr. Aviators were founded as members of the International Junior Hockey League with ties to the New York Aviators, a minor professional team in Brooklyn, New York. After its second season, both the IJHL and the parent club both folded, leaving the fate of the junior team uncertain. In December 2012, the club's owners purchased the franchise rights of the Buffalo Stars, who had folded in the middle of the season. Their spot in the Empire Junior Hockey League was then assumed by the 'New York Aviators' who were set to resume play the following year. That summer, the EmJHL agreed to a new structure where they came under the oversight of the newly-formed United States Premier Hockey League.

The Aviators played for two seasons in the league's new Emprire Division, winning the championship in 2015. That summer, the Aviators left the USPHL and transferred to the North American 3 Eastern Hockey League, which was under control of the rival North American 3 Hockey League. After one year, team owner Jim Loughran announced that the team was moving to Long Beach and would become the Sharks.

== Season-by-season records ==
Season	GP	W	L	T	OTL	SOL	Pts	GF	GA	Regular season finish	Playoffs
International Junior Hockey League
2010–11	44	9	32	3	-	-	21	77	140	4th of 5, Mid-Atlantic Div. 7th of 10, IJHL Super Elite	Did not qualify
2011–12	Missing information										
Empire Junior Hockey League
2012–13	Inactive										
United States Premier Hockey League – Empire
2013–14	40	22	16	-	0	2	46	192	164	5th of 9, Western Conf. 10th of 26, USPHL Empire	Lost First Round Robin, 4–5 (Jersey Hitmen), 4–10 (Rochester Jr. Americans), 2–7 (Florida Eels)
2014–15	40	31	8	-	1	-	63	192	164	t-2nd of 13, North Conf. t-3rd of 22, USPHL Empire	Won North Pool A Round Robin, 7–4 (Islanders Hockey Club), 2–0 (Springfield Pics), 4–3 (Jersey Shore Whalers); Won North Semifinal, 10–1 (Jersey Hitmen); Won Semifinal Round Robin, 2–1 (Syracuse Stars), 7–3 (Florida Jr. Blades), 6–3 (Atlanta Jr. Knights); Won Championship, 6–3 (Florida Jr. Blades)
North American 3 Eastern Hockey League
2015–16	44	31	9	-	4	-	66	224	143	2nd of 6, Western Conf. 5th of 13, NA3EHL	Won Quarterfinal, ? (Roc City Royals); Lost Semifinal, ? (Jersey Shore Wildcats)
