= Row House (Hallowell, Maine) =

Historic house in Maine, United States

- U.S. National Register of Historic Places
- U.S. Historic district – Contributing property
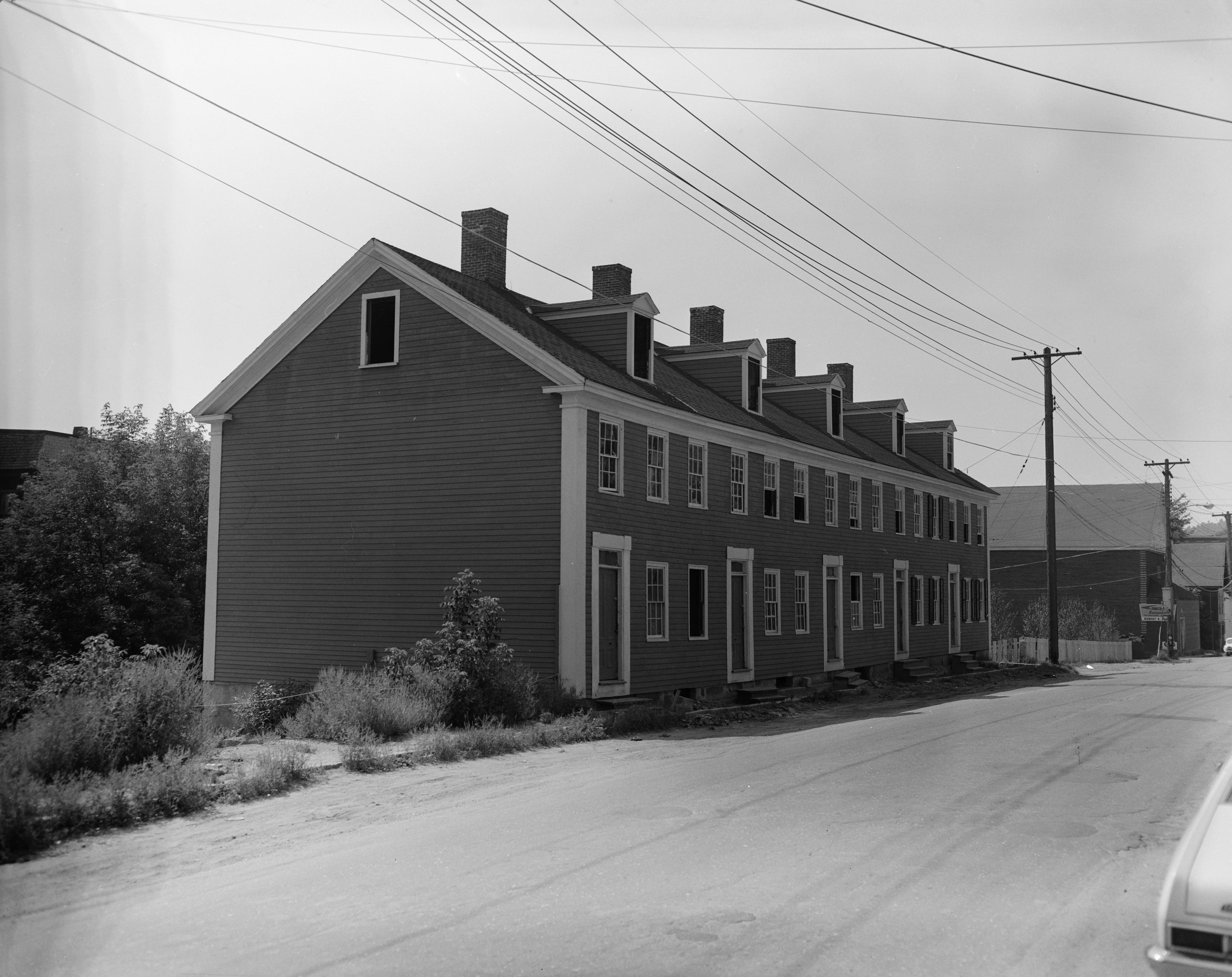
- HABS photo, 1971

- Location within Maine
- Location: 106-114 2nd St., Hallowell, Maine
- Coordinates: 44°17′11.6″N 69°47′27″W
- Area: 0.2 acres (0.081 ha)
- Built: 1840
- Architectural style: Greek Revival
- Part of: Hallowell Historic District (ID70000076)
- NRHP reference No.: 70000047

Significant dates
- Added to NRHP: July 1, 1970
- Designated CP: October 28, 1970

The Row House is a historic multiunit tenement house at 106-114 2nd Street in downtown Hallowell, Maine. Built in 1840, it is one of a small number of row houses built in 19th-century Maine, and is believed to be the oldest built of wood. It was listed on the National Register of Historic Places in 1970.

== Description and history ==
The Row House stands on the east side of 2nd Street, between Winthrop and Central Streets, and just west of Water Street, the city's main commercial thoroughfare. It is a long rectangular 2 1/2-story wood-frame building, with a gabled roof and clapboard siding. It houses for essentially identical units, each three bays wide with the entrance in the left bay. Windows are sash, and the doors are framed by broad molding with square corner blocks, and a simple narrow entablature runs below the main roof. Each unit has a single gabled dormer piercing the roof. Interiors feature period fireplaces and woodwork, the latter apparently machined.

The row house was built about 1840 for Isaac Gage, a prominent local landowner based in Boston, Massachusetts. Gage may have known architect Charles Bulfinch, a proponent of row houses whose family often summered in Hallowell because both were members of Boston's Old South Meeting House. Bulfinch's row houses were predominantly designed for upper-class owners, while this one was clearly built as a rental property for workers in Hallowell's industries. The building underwent a major restoration in the early 1970s.

This restoration was part of the national project from Row House Inc. Which has restored these houses and utilized these houses to make the area a historic area. These houses were utilized for their representation of the upper-class lifestyles shown from the 19th and 20th centuries.

== See also ==
- National Register of Historic Places listings in Kennebec County, Maine
