= Shawn Simpson =

Canadian ice hockey player (1968–2025)

- Born: August 10, 1968; Vancouver, British Columbia, Canada
- Died: January 29, 2025 (aged 56); Ottawa, Ontario, Canada
- Height: 5 ft 11 in (180 cm)
- Weight: 155 lb (70 kg; 11 st 1 lb)
- Position: Goaltender
- Caught: Right
- Played for: AHL; Baltimore Skipjacks
- National team: Canada
- NHL draft: 60th overall, 1986; Washington Capitals
- Playing career: 1988–1991

Shawn Simpson (August 10, 1968 – January 29, 2025) was a Canadian ice hockey player and on-air personality with TSN 1200 radio in Ottawa. After retiring as a player, Simpson worked in the front office for both the Washington Capitals and the Toronto Maple Leafs organizations.

== Early life ==
Simpson was born and adopted in Vancouver, British Columbia, and never knew his birth parents. His family relocated to Chatham, Ontario. When he was 5 years old, his family moved to Canadian Forces Base - Rockcliffe. His parents Lyle and Shirley divorced when he was 10 years old. His father remarried and his mother moved several more times between the time Simpson was 10 to 16 years old.

== Playing career ==
=== Junior ===
Simpson was a member of the 1987 Canadian national junior team that was disqualified from the World Junior Championship for their involvement in the infamous "Punch-up in Piestany". He was also a first-team OHL all-star in 1987. Simpson was drafted 60th overall in the 1986 NHL draft by the Washington Capitals, the first goaltender selected that year.

=== Professional ===
Simpson's professional playing career was short, with only 35 games played over three seasons for the Baltimore Skipjacks, the AHL affiliate of the Washington Capitals. Although he never officially played a National Hockey League game, Simpson dressed in 1988 and 1990 as a back-up goaltender for the Capitals for several playoff games.

== Executive career ==
=== Washington Capitals ===
After retiring due to injury, Simpson joined the Capitals' television network, where he worked for two years as a colour commentator while completing law school at Georgetown University. He then served as a scout in the Washington Capitals organization for the next six years. In 1997, Simpson was promoted to director of hockey operations for the Capitals, and he also served as the general manager of the AHL's Portland Pirates, the Capitals' main affiliate.

=== Toronto Maple Leafs ===
In 2004, Simpson left the Capitals organization and joined the Toronto Maple Leafs as a professional scout. In June 2008, Simpson was fired as part of a general shake-up in the Leafs organization.

=== Other ventures ===
In April 2009, Simpson was hired by Glen Hanlon, with whom he had previously worked in Washington, to be the deputy director of hockey operations for HC Dinamo Minsk in the KHL. Both men were fired in October 2009. Later that same year, Simpson became the president of the Cape Cod Cubs of the International Junior Hockey League.

== Broadcasting career ==
Simpson began working for sports radio station The Team 1200 in Ottawa in January 2012, where he co-hosted "The Drive" with Ian Mendes, as well as the Ottawa Senators post-game broadcasts. In October 2013, The Team 1200 was rebranded as TSN 1200. Simpson hosted "Mornings" with co-host John Rodenburg. He was terminated by Bell Media on June 14, 2023.

== Death ==
Simpson died in Ottawa on January 29, 2025, at the age of 56. His death was confirmed by the Ottawa Senators through their X account the following day.
