= Farmingdale =

Farmingdale is the name of several places in the United States of America:

- Farmingdale, Illinois
- Farmingdale, Maine
  - Farmingdale (CDP), Maine
- Farmingdale, New Jersey
- Farmingdale, New York
  - Farmingdale (LIRR station)
- Farmingdale, South Dakota
