= Northeast Generals (NA3HL) =

- City: Attleboro, Massachusetts
- League: North American 3 Hockey League
- Division: East
- Founded: 2010
- Home arena: New England Sports Village
- Colors: Orange, navy blue, and white
- Affiliate: Northeast Generals

Franchise history
- 2015–2025: Northeast Generals

Championships
- Regular season titles: 2: 2022, 2023
- Division titles: 5: 2020, 2021, 2022, 2023, 2024

The Northeast Generals are a Tier III junior ice hockey team playing in the North American 3 Hockey League. The Generals play their home games at the New England Sports Village in Attleboro, Massachusetts.

== History ==
The North American 3 Eastern Hockey League announced the addition of the Northeast Generals as an expansion franchise. The following summer, the entire league was absorbed into the parent North American 3 Hockey League. The Generals swiftly became one of the top teams in the NA3HL, winning 5 consecutive division titles beginning in 2020 that also included two league titles. Northeast was able to reach the third round of the NA3HL tournament on four occasions, the national semifinal twice and played in the championship game in 2024.

Prior to the start of the 2025-26 season the Northeast Generals of the NAHL dropped their NA3HL affiliate and purchased the Bridgewater Bandits as their feeder club.

== Season-by-season records ==
Season	GP	W	L	OTL	SOL	Pts	GF	GA	Regular season finish	Playoffs
North American 3 Eastern Hockey League
2015–16	44	9	32	3	-	21	113	239	6th of 7, East Div. 11th of 13, NA3EHL	Did not qualify
North American 3 Hockey League
2016–17	47	24	18	4	1	53	161	143	4th of 7, Coastal Div. t–20th of 48, NA3HL	Lost Div. Semifinal series, 0–2 (Long Beach Sharks)
2017–18	47	27	17	2	1	57	199	164	3rd of 6, Coastal Div. 18th of 42, NA3HL	Lost Div. Semifinal series, 1–2 (Lewiston/Auburn Nordiques)
2018–19	47	33	12	1	1	68	234	145	2nd of 6, Coastal Div. t–9th of 36, NA3HL	Won Div. Semifinal series, 0–2 (New England Stars); Lost Div. Final series, 0–2 (Lewiston/Auburn Nordiques)
2019–20	47	40	6	0	1	81	321	100	1st of 5, Coastal Div. 2nd of 34, NA3HL	Led Div. Semifinal series, 1–0 (New England Knights); Remainder of postseason cancelled
2020–21	41	32	9	0	0	64	245	108	1st of 5, East Div. 4th of 31, NA3HL	Won Div. Semifinal series, 2–1 (New England Sharks); Won Div. Final series, 2–1 (Mass Titans); Lost Pool A Quarterfinal Round Robin, 2–13 (Sheridan Hawks), 1–8 (North Iowa Bulls)
2021–22	47	45	2	0	0	90	251	83	1st of 6, East Div. 1st of 34, NA3HL	Won Div. Semifinal series, 2–0 (Bay State Bobcats); Won Div. Final series, 2–1 (Danbury Jr. Hat Tricks); Won Pool A Quarterfinal Round Robin, 5–2 (Rochester Grizzlies), 3–2 (Gillette Wild); Lost Semifinal, 3–4 (Granite City Lumberjacks)
2022–23	47	41	4	1	1	84	241	80	1st of 6, East Div. 1st of 34, NA3HL	Won Div. Semifinal series, 2–0 (Long Beach Sharks); Won Div. Final series, 2–0 (Danbury Jr. Hat Tricks); Lost Pool B Quarterfinal Round Robin, 2–3 (Oregon Tradesmen), 1–4 (Helena Bighorns)
2023–24	47	41	5	0	1	83	191	90	1st of 6, East Div. 2nd of 34, NA3HL	Won Div. Semifinal series, 2–0 (New Hampshire Jr. Mountain Kings); Won Div. Final series, 2–0 (Norwich Sea Captains); Won Pool B Quarterfinal Round Robin, 1–4 (Helena Bighorns), 3–0 (Louisiana Drillers); Won Semifinal, 2–1 (Granite City Lumberjacks); Lost Championship, 1–3 (Helena Bighorns)
2024–25	47	28	18	1	0	57	151	145	2nd of 7, East Div. t–13th of 35, NA3HL	Won Div. Semifinal series, 2–0 (Norwich Sea Captains); Lost Div. Final series, 0–2 (Binghamton Buzz)
2025–26	see - Bridgewater Bandits									
