= Kennebec Intra-District Schools =

School district in Maine, United States

Address
- 7 Reed Street Hallowell, Maine, 4347; United States

District information
- Type: Public
- Grades: PreK–12
- Superintendent: Rick Amero
- NCES District ID: 2314776

Students and staff
- Students: 1,883
- Teachers: 179.97
- Staff: 217.3
- Student–teacher ratio: 10.46

Other information
- Website: www.kidsrsu.org

Kennebec Intra-District Schools (KIDS) a.k.a. Regional School Unit 2 (RSU 2) is a school district headquartered in Hallowell, Maine. In addition to Hallowell it serves Dresden, Farmingdale and Monmouth.

== History ==
Superintendents:

- 2007-2011: Donald Siviski
- 2011-2015: Virgel Hammonds
- 2015-2019: Bill Zima
- August, 2019-April 2020: Cheri Towle
- April 2020-August 2020: Mary Paine (interim)
- August 2020-February, 2022: Tonya Arnold
- February, 2022-October, 2022: Matt Gilbert
- October, 2022–present: Rick Amero

== District boundary ==
Part of the district is in Kennebec County, where it includes the city of Hallowell and the towns of Farmingdale and Monmouth. Farmingdale town includes the Farmingdale census-designated place.

Another part of the district is in Lincoln County, where it includes the town of Dresden.

Another part is in Sagadahoc County, where it includes Richmond town. Richmond CDP is within Richmond town.

== Curriculum ==
Circa 1993 the district (then MSAD 16, which included only Hallowell and Farmingdale) received a grant to teach languages that are different from indo-European languages that were key to foreign relations and trade and selected Japanese after considering Maine's foreign trade and conducting a survey of area businesses. Its first Japanese teacher, Naoto Kobayashi, had a wife who vacationed in Maine. The program was for grades 3-7 initially but extended up to grade 12.

== Schools ==
High schools:

- Hall-Dale High School
- Monmouth Academy

K-8:

- Monmouth Memorial School

Middle and schools:

- Hall-Dale Middle School

Elementary schools:

- Dresden Elementary School
- Hall-Dale Elementary School
