= Jersey Shore Wildcats =

- City: Wall Township, New Jersey
- Founded: 2009
- Folded: 2017
- Home arena: Jersey Shore Arena
- Colors: Black, red, white

Franchise history
- 2009–2013: Trenton Habs
- 2013–2017: Jersey Shore Wildcats

The Jersey Shore Wildcats were a Tier III Junior "A" ice hockey team from Trenton, New Jersey.

== History ==
The team was founded in 2009 as the Trenton Habs and joined the International Junior Hockey League (IJHL) for the 2008–09 season as an associate member, playing a season of exhibition games against IJHL teams as well as participating in league showcase and national championship tournament. The team joined the IJHL as a full member for the 2010–11 season in the IJHL's Jr. Super Elite League. The Habs finished the 2009–10 season winning the IJHL Super Elite National Championship. In the summer of 2012, the IJHL folded causing the Habs and many former teams of the IJHL Super Elite Division to form the Northern States Hockey League (NSHL) under the AAU.

In May 2013, it was announced that the organization joined forces with the Wichita Falls Wildcats of the North American Hockey League to give players more opportunities and exposure and renamed the team the Jersey Shore Wildcats.

The Jersey Shore Wildcats were a Tier III Junior "A" ice hockey team from Wall Township, New Jersey. They were a members of the International Junior Hockey League, Northern States Hockey League, North American 3 Eastern Hockey League, and the North American 3 Hockey League.

In 2014, the NSHL left AAU sanctioning with the intention of joining USA Hockey. The Tier II North American Hockey League (NAHL) then took over operations during the 2014–15 season and changed the name of the league to the North American 3 Eastern Hockey League (NA3EHL). Prior to the 2016–17 season, the Wildcats became part of the North American 3 Hockey League (NA3HL) when it absorbed the NA3EHL.

In 2017, their NAHL affiliate, the Wichita Falls Wildcats, folded during the offseason. The Jersey Shore Wildcats continued into the 2017–18 NA3HL season, but games were cancelled in mid-November 2017. By December, the team was removed from the league due to apparently owing the league compensation even though the team was in second place in their division at the time. The organization continued to operate teams at the youth level.

== Season-by-season records ==
Season	GP	W	L	OTL	Pts	GF	GA	PIM	Regular season finish	Playoffs
Northern States Hockey League
2012–13	42	24	16	2	50	163	121	—	3rd of 7, NSHL	Lost Quarterfinal game vs. Eastern Kodiaks
Jersey Shore Wildcats
2013–14	40	19	18	3	41	129	134	—	5th of 9, NSHL	Won Round 1 series, 2–1 vs. Junior Mariners; Won Semifinal game vs. AHI Fighting Spirit; Won League Championship game vs. Wilkes-Barre Miners; League champions
North American 3 Eastern Hockey League
2014–15	41	40	1	0	80	217	79	843	1st of 5, Western Div. 1st of 10, NA3EHL	Won Div. Semifinals, 2–1 vs. Roc City Royals; Won Div. Finals, 2–0 vs. Wilkes-Barre Miners; Won League Championships, 2–1 vs. New Hampshire Fighting Spirit; League champions
2015–16	44	37	7	0	74	258	111	973	1st of 6, Western Div. 1st of 13, NA3EHL	Won Div. Semifinals, 2–0 vs. Lockport Express; Won Div. Finals, 2–1 vs. New York Aviators; Won League Championships, 2–0 vs. Cape Cod Islanders; League champions
North American 3 Hockey League
2016–17	47	26	20	1	53	165	165	775	2nd of 6, Northeast Div. 20th of 48, NA3HL	Won Div. Semifinals, 2–0 vs. Syracuse Stampede; Lost Div. Finals, 0–2 vs. Binghamton Jr. Senators
2017–18	22	15	7	0	30	98	68	335	Removed from league midseason	

=== United Hockey Union Nationals ===
AAU Sanctioned Junior A National Championship
In 2013 & 2014, the MWJHL, NSHL, & WSHL advanced two teams each.

Year	Round Robin	Record Ranking	Semifinal	Championship
2014	L, El Paso Rhinos (WSHL) 1–3; L, AHI Fighting Spirit (NSHL) 1–5; L, Traverse City Hounds (MWJHL) 3–6	0–3–0; 6th of 6	Did not advance	
