= Bank of Maine Ice Vault =

American ice hockey arena

- Interactive map of Bank of Maine Ice Vault
- Location: 203 Whitten Road, Hallowell, Maine, United States
- Coordinates: 44.303857°N 69.809789°W
- Owner: Steven Prescott
- Operator: Kennebec Ice Arena Inc
- Capacity: 536 plus mezzanine standing platform
- Surface: Ice

Construction
- Groundbreaking: February 16, 2012
- Opened: July 7, 2012
- Cost: $4 million

Tenants
- Maine Moose of NSHL; Skating Association of Maine

Bank of Maine Ice Vault is an indoor ice arena located in Hallowell, Maine. It is the home of the Maine Moose ice hockey team which plays in the Northern States Junior Hockey League, and the Skating Association of Maine.

The arena stands on the site of a prior arena, called the Kennebec Ice Arena. It was built in 1973 and collapsed under the weight of snow on March 2, 2011.

The Maine Moose played their first home game in the new arena against the New York Aviators on October 19, 2012.
