= Long Beach Sharks (NA3HL) =

- City: Long Beach, New York
- League: North American 3 Hockey League
- Division: East
- Founded: 2010
- Home arena: Long Beach Municipal Ice Arena
- Colors: Blue, gray, black and white
- Owner: George Chalos
- General manager: Jeff Tory
- Head coach: Jeff Tory
- Affiliates: Oklahoma Warriors

Franchise history
- 2010–2016: New York Jr. Aviators
- 2016–2020: Long Beach Sharks
- 2020–2021: New England Sharks
- 2021–present: Long Beach Sharks

Championships
- Division titles: 2: 2017, 2026

The Long Beach Sharks are a Tier III junior ice hockey team playing in the North American 3 Hockey League. The Sharks play their home games at the Long Beach Municipal Ice Arena in Long Beach, New York.

== History ==
In 2016, team owner Jim Loughran announced that the team was moving to Long Beach and would become the Sharks. During the COVID-shorted 2020–21, the team was forced to play the entire season on the road due to health restrictions. For a brief time, the team was called the 'New England Sharks' due to these COVID restrictions.

== Season-by-season records ==
Season	GP	W	L	OTL	SOL	Pts	GF	GA	Regular season finish	Playoffs
2016–17	47	35	10	1	1	72	260	161	1st of 5, Coastal Div. 6th of 48, NA3HL	Won Div. Semifinal series, 2–0 (Northeast Generals); Won Div. Final series, 2–1 (New England Stars); Lost Silver Cup Round Robin, 1–8 (Binghamton Jr. Senators), 2–5 (Yellowstone Quake), 4–8 (North Iowa Bulls)
2017–18	47	6	39	1	0	13	93	298	6th of 6, Coastal Div. 39th of 42, NA3HL	Did not qualify
2018–19	47	15	30	2	0	32	162	263	4th of 6, Coastal Div. 27th of 36, NA3HL	Lost Div. Semifinal series, 0–2 (Lewiston/Auburn Nordiques)
2019–20	47	3	42	2	0	8	99	342	4th of 4, Northeast Div. 34th of 34, NA3HL	Did not qualify
2020–21	38	9	24	1	4	23	102	177	5th of 5, East Div. 25th of 31, NA3HL	Won Play-in series, 2–0 (Bay State Bobcats); Lost Div. Semifinal series, 1–2 (Northeast Generals)
2021–22	47	28	14	4	3	63	150	122	2nd of 6, East Div. 13th of 34, NA3HL	Lost Div. Semifinal series, 0–2 (Danbury Jr. Hat Tricks)
2022–23	47	20	22	3	2	45	129	153	4th of 6, East Div. 22nd of 34, NA3HL	Lost Div. Semifinal series, 0–2 (Northeast Generals)
2023–24	47	12	33	1	1	26	108	171	5th of 6, East Div. 28th of 34, NA3HL	Did not qualify
2024–25	47	8	32	7	0	23	137	200	7th of 7, East Div. t–32th of 35, NA3HL	Did not qualify
2025–26	47	32	13	2	1	65	133	46	1st of 6, East Div. 9th of 38, NA3HL	Won Div. Semifinal series, 2–1 (New Jersey Titans (NA3HL)); Won Div. Final series, 2–0 (New Hampshire Jr. Mountain Kings); Lost Pool B Fraser Cup Round Robin, 10–2 (Granite City Lumberjacks), 6–3 (Texas Jr. Brahmas)
