= IJHL =

IJHL may refer to:

- Island Junior Hockey League, a Junior "B" ice hockey league in Prince Edward Island, Canada founded in 1996
- Island Junior Hockey League (1973–1991), the original IJHL in Price Edward Island
- International Junior Hockey League, an independent Tier III Junior A ice hockey league in the northeastern United States
