= The Colisée =

Stadium in Lewiston, Maine, U.S.

Coordinates: 44°5′44″N 70°12′19″W

- Colisée, The ABC
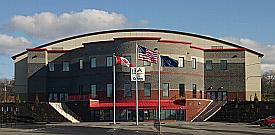
- The Colisée
- Interactive map of The Colisée
- Former names: Central Maine Youth Center (1958–1989); Central Maine Civic Center (1989–2004); Lewiston Colisée (2004–2006); Androscoggin Bank Colisée (2006–2021)
- Location: Lewiston, Maine
- Owner: Mill Town Sports and Entertainment, LLC
- Capacity: 3,677 (2,634 hockey)

Construction
- Groundbreaking: 1956
- Opened: 1958
- Cost: $1 million, with $5 million renovations

Tenants
- Maine Nordiques (NAHL) (1973–1977); Lewiston Maineiacs (QMJHL) (2003–2011); Portland Pirates (AHL) (2013–2014); Maine Nordiques (NAHL) (2019–2025); Maine Nordiques (NA3HL) (2024–2025); Lewiston MAINEiacs (USPHL) (2025–present)

The Colisée, formerly Androscoggin Bank Colisée, Central Maine Youth Center, Central Maine Civic Center, and Lewiston Colisée, is a 4,000 capacity (3,677 seated) multi-purpose arena, in Lewiston, Maine, United States that was built from 1956 to 1958 and opened in the latter year to replace the Dominics Regional High School Arena and was initially constructed and operated by the Catholic parish of SS. Peter and Paul. Notably, it was used as a replacement venue for the boxing match between Muhammad Ali and Sonny Liston in 1965.

The Colisée is used for concerts, conventions and trade shows. There is 17,000 square feet (1600 m^{2}) of exhibit space. For conventions, it can accommodate up to 4,800 patrons.

== History ==
The Maine Nordiques of the former professional North American Hockey League were the primary tenant at the Civic Center from 1973 to 1977. The Boston Celtics of the National Basketball Association played exhibition games at the Civic Center.

In 2003, the Lewiston Maineiacs came to the Central Maine Civic Center. The Central Maine Civic Center was renamed to the Lewiston Colisée (from the French word for colosseum, similar to the Colisée de Québec) to distinguish it from the Cumberland County Civic Center, the Augusta Civic Center, and the Bangor Civic Center. In 2007, the Maineiacs won the Presidents Cup, the QMJHL league championship. They remain the only U.S.-based QMJHL team to win the Presidents Cup. The Maineiacs folded at the end of the 2010–11 QMJHL season and the Sherbrooke Phoenix was created in its place.

The Federal Hockey League held five home games at the arena in 2011 and 2012. Due to renovations to the Cumberland County Civic Center, the American Hockey League's Portland Pirates played at the Colisée during the 2012–13 AHL season for six games. The Pirates also played at the Colisée for the all but one of their home games for the 2013–14 AHL season due to a lease dispute with Cumberland County.

On December 16, 2014, it was announced the New Hampshire Fighting Spirit from the North American 3 Eastern Hockey League, a Tier III junior league, would relocate to Lewiston and play home games at the Colisee as the L/A Fighting Spirit (with the L/A standing for Lewiston-Auburn) beginning with the 2015–16 season. In 2016, the Fighting Spirit joined the North American 3 Hockey League.

Firland Management, which had acquired the Colisée from the City of Lewiston in 2008, bought the Fighting Spirit in 2017 and rebranded the team as the Lewiston/Auburn Nordiques after the former professional team. In 2019, Cain, Darryl Antonacci, and Nolan Howe were granted an expansion team in the Tier II junior North American Hockey League and named the team the Maine Nordiques. In March 2020, Antonacci agreed to purchase the Colisée and the Tier III Nordiques from Cain. Later that year, Antonacci folded the Tier III junior team and replaced it with Tier I youth teams.

The naming rights to the venue were sold to Androscoggin Bank in 2006. In 2020, the rights expired, and the bank's name was removed from the venue the following year.

On May 5, 2023, the North American Hockey League announced that Maine Nordiques owner Darryl Antonacci had sold the team to Shift Sports and Entertainment, LLC. The agreement included a five-year lease renewal at the Colisée. Shortly thereafter, the Nordiques agreed to terminate their five-year lease extension in order to facilitate a sale of the Colisée. A sale to Mill Town Sports and Entertainment was finalized in July 2025. Shortly thereafter, Mill Town Sports and Entertainment announced that they could not come to a lease extension with the Nordiques, citing unpaid bills from Shift Sports and Entertainment. The Nordiques will instead play the 2025–26 season at the Norway Savings Bank Arena in neighboring Auburn, Maine. Mill Town Sports and Entertainment subsequently moved their Eastern Hockey League team, the Boston Dukes, from Tewksbury, Massachusetts to Lewiston to play in the Colisée. Mill Town rebranded the Dukes to the Lewiston Maineiacs, and the new Maineiacs joined the United States Premier Hockey League's National Collegiate Development Conference.

== Other uses ==
=== Ali vs. Liston fight ===
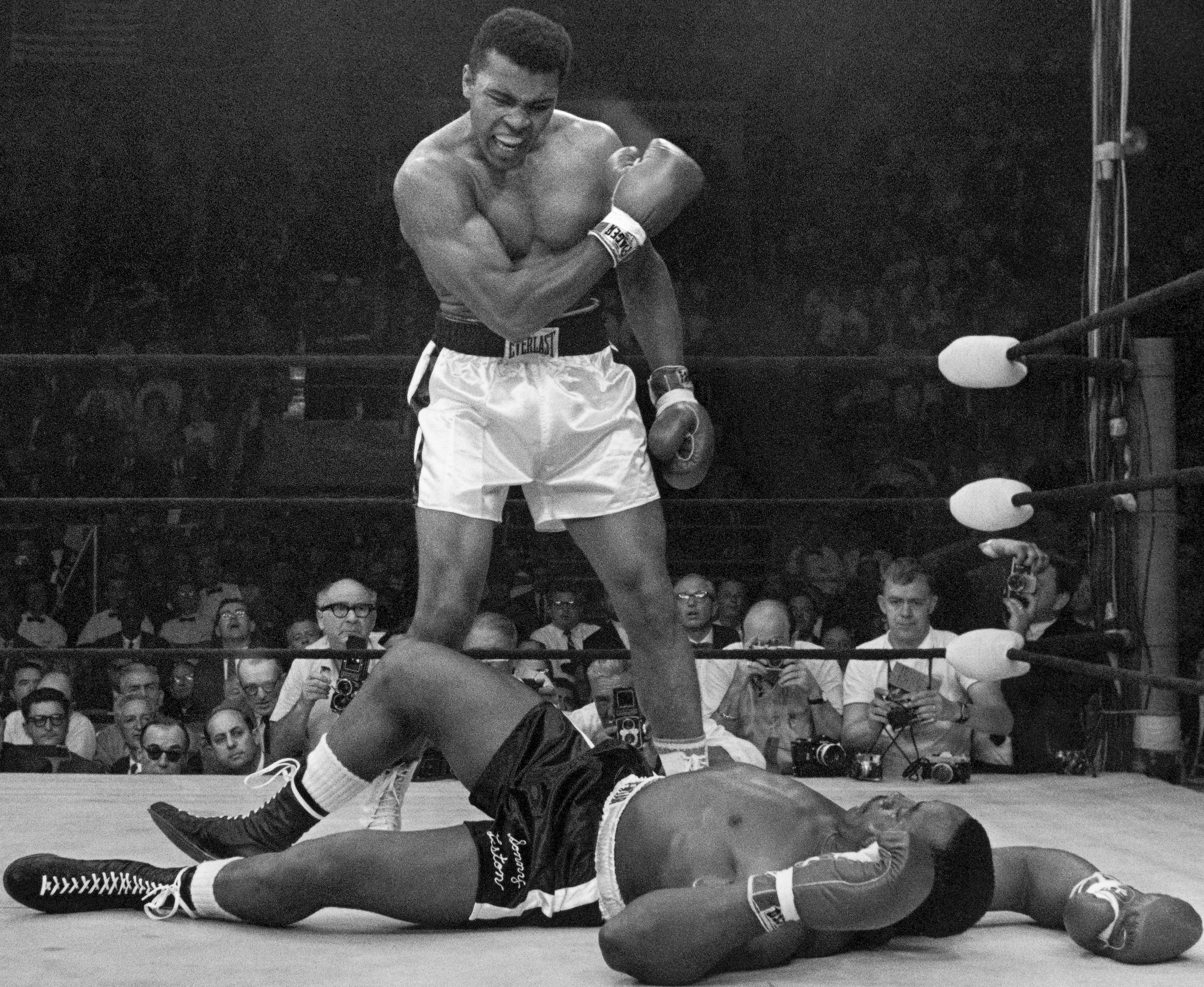
Muhammad Ali standing over Sonny Liston

On May 25, 1965, the Youth Center was the venue for the WBC heavyweight boxing championship rematch between 34-year old former champ Sonny Liston and 23-year-old reigning champion Muhammad Ali. It was at this fight that Sports Illustrated photographer Neil Leifer took what Time magazine has called the "perhaps the greatest sports photo of the century."

=== Concerts ===
On March 19, 1977, Bruce Springsteen and the E Street Band played at the venue. Bob Dylan performed at the venue on November 13, 2000, May 17, 2008 and on April 10, 2013.

=== Mixed martial arts ===
Bellator MMA held their first event in Maine on March 21, 2013, Bellator 93.

=== Ring of Honor/New Japan Pro-Wrestling ===
On November 7, 2018, Ring of Honor made its Maine debut at the Coliseé. As a co-promoted Global Wars show with New Japan Pro-Wrestling, it also marked the Japanese promotion's first event in New England.

Sporting positions
Preceded by Herb Brooks Arena	Host of the Division III men's Frozen Four; 2014	Succeeded by Ridder Arena
