= Capt. Nathaniel Stone House =

Historic house in Maine, United States

- U.S. National Register of Historic Places
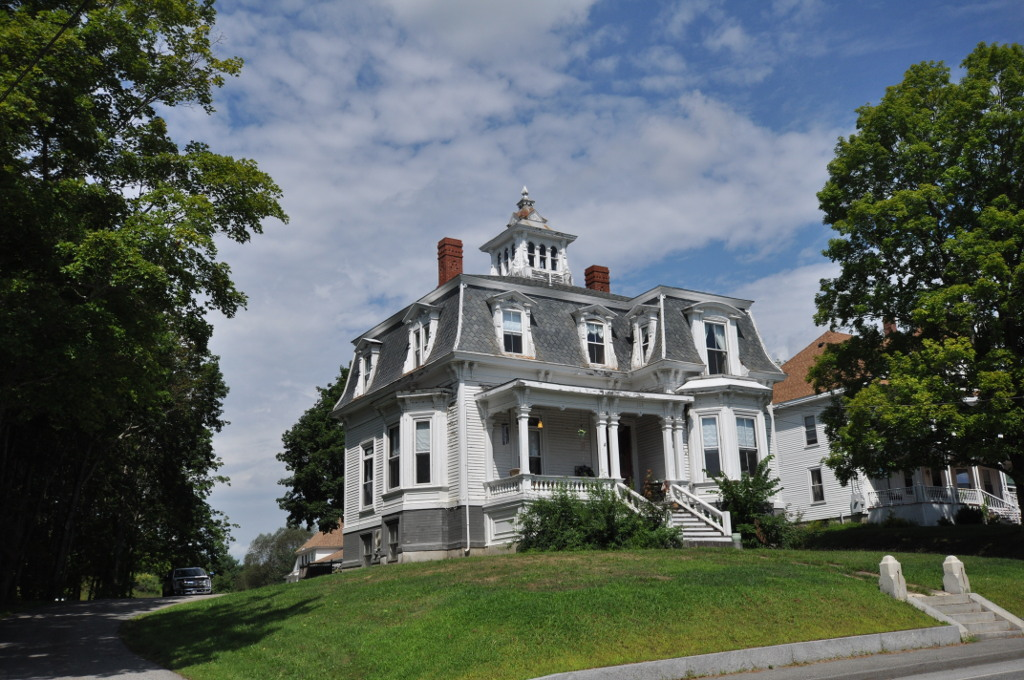

- Location within Maine Location within the United States
- Location: 268 Maine Ave., Farmingdale, Maine
- Coordinates: 44°14′21″N 69°46′19″W
- Area: 0.7 acres (0.28 ha)
- Built: 1872
- Built by: Nathaniel Stone
- Architectural style: Second Empire, Italianate
- NRHP reference No.: 03000292
- Added to NRHP: April 22, 2003

The Capt. Nathaniel Stone House, also known as the Ring House, is a historic house at 268 Maine Street (Maine State Route 27) in Farmingdale, Maine. Built in 1872, it is the small community's only significant example of Second Empire architecture. It was listed on the National Register of Historic Places in 2003.

== Description and history ==
The Stone House stands on the west side of Maine Street in southeastern Farmingdale, just north of its junction with Sheldon Street. It is a 1 1/2-story wood-frame structure, with a flared mansard roof providing space for a full second floor. It is topped by an elaborately decorated cupola. It is three bays wide, with the right bay projecting forward to give the building an L shape, with a single-story porch extending across the rest of the front. Roof eaves are studded with paired brackets, as are the cornices of projecting window bays on the front and side. The porch is supported by chamfered square posts, and features a low balustrade and a decorative valance. The roof is broken by gabled dormers with decorative hooded windows. The house's interior features original ornate wooden finishes, and fine fireplace mantels, including one of delicately veined black marble. The interior was damaged by fire in 1912, and some of its features reflect the design aesthetic of that period.

The house was built in 1872 by Nathaniel Stone and his son Uriah. Stone, retired at the time, had conducted a successful business career as a chandler and real estate investor, operating in Gardiner and Boston. They also built a similarly styled carriage barn, which was torn down in 1950. Uriah Stone sold the house in 1886 to William Ring. The house was set to be auctioned for unpaid taxes in 1912 when the fire broke out, claiming Ring's life. Although significantly damaged, it was largely rebuilt to its original appearance by its eventual buyer.

== See also ==
- National Register of Historic Places listings in Kennebec County, Maine
