= Maine Industrial School for Girls =

- Maine Industrial School for Girls Historic District
- U.S. National Register of Historic Places
- U.S. Historic district
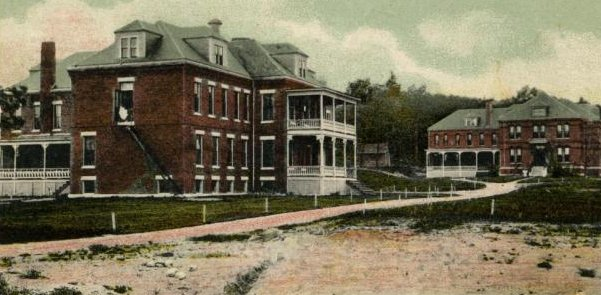
- c. 1900 postcard view of the school

- Location within Maine Location within the United States
- Location: Winthrop St., 0.5 mi. W of jct. with Water St., Hallowell, Maine
- Coordinates: 44°17′31″N 69°47′50″W
- Area: 5.7 acres (2.3 ha)
- Built: 1898
- Built by: Thissel, J. & Sons; et.al.
- Architectural style: Italian Villa, Colonial Revival
- NRHP reference No.: 03000289
- Added to NRHP: April 22, 2003

The Maine Industrial School for Girls, also once known as the Stevens School and the State School for Girls in Hallowell, is a former juvenile detention and education facility on Winthrop Street in Hallowell, Maine. The school operated from its founding in 1874 until the mid-1970s. Its campus, listed on the National Register of Historic Places, housed a variety of state offices, and a state Department of Corrections pre-release center until 2003 when the state put the complex up for sale and began moving offices off campus. The site remained unsold until 2016, when it was purchased by Mastway Development, LLC of Winthrop, Maine. Since then the main building has been completely renovated to serve as a 36-bed student dormitory for the University of Maine at Augusta which opened in August 2019.

== Description and history ==
The former Maine Industrial School for Girls campus is located just northwest of downtown Hallowell, on the north side of Winthrop Street. It occupies about 6 acres (2.4 ha), set on an east-facing hillside overlooking the downtown and the Kennebec River beyond. The campus buildings are generally rectangular brick structures, aligned with the long axis running north–south. They are organized around a central grassy area. The oldest surviving building, located near the southeastern edge of the campus, dates to 1898. The most prominent buildings are the former Central Building (1917–19) on the east side of the green, and Stevens Hall (1936–38) on the west side. Most of the buildings have some measure of Colonial Revival styling, although the 1898 Baker Building has an Italianate corbelled cornice. The 1905-06 Administration was designed by Lewiston architect William R. Miller.

The school was established by an act of the state legislature in 1874, as a place where "wayward girls" could be given a proper moral education, in a facility similar to one that had previously been established for boys. It was roughly modeled on the Lancaster Industrial School for Girls in Massachusetts. The school was at first considered to be a nominally secure educational facility or reform school, and not a correctional facility. This view evolved over time, and by the time of its closure in the 1970s it was viewed more as a penal institution.

The school's earliest buildings were either destroyed by fire or torn down. Following the school's closure, its buildings were repurposed by the state to house offices of some of its departments. The campus was listed on the National Register of Historic Places in 2003. Following closure of the Stevens School in the mid-1970s, the buildings were repurposed for state offices until 2003 when state put the complex up for sale and began moving offices off campus. The site remained unsold until 2016, when it was purchased by Mastway Development, LLC. By this time, most of the long vacant buildings, considered an eyesore by the community, has suffered from neglect and considerable deferred maintenance. The Administration Building was the first rehabilitation project to be completed at the Stevens School campus in 2018 using state and federal historic tax credits. The building is now professional office space on the first floor with four apartments filling the upper stories. In 2018 Mastway Development also collaborated with the city to site and build a new Hallowell Fire Station on the campus. The City of Hallowell has contributed to the rehabilitation of the campus with more than a half million dollars in infrastructure improvements funded by a citizen-supported bond issue.

Erskine Hall, sitting at the head of the common green will house the second student housing building for University of Maine at Augusta with accommodations for 47 more students in the Fall of 2020. The former dormitory building is being converted into new apartments with classic finishes and modern amenities, porches, patios and student lounges. This building abuts Stevens Hall which currently houses 36 students from the University of Maine at Augusta. Next door to Erskine Hall is the Central Commons building which will boast 29 new apartments through CHOM, Community Housing of Maine's affordable senior housing project opening in 2020. Behind Erskine Hall is the Flagg Dummer building, which is under development for housing.

== See also ==
- National Register of Historic Places listings in Kennebec County, Maine
