= Cape Cod Islanders =

US junior ice hockey team

- League: North American 3 Hockey League
- Founded: 2008
- Colors: Black, gold, and white
- Owner(s): CC Hockey Group LLC (Scott Hogan, Dan Hodge, Alex Druila)

Franchise history
- 2008–2011: Cape Cod Cubs
- 2011–2019: Cape Cod Islanders
- Announced: Canton Cubs

The Cape Cod Islanders were a Tier III junior ice hockey team from Massachusetts. They were most recently a member of the North American 3 Hockey League and played at the Falmouth Ice Arena in Falmouth, Massachusetts. In 2019, they announced they were relocating to Canton, Massachusetts, as the Canton Cubs, but were removed from the league schedule at the beginning of the season.

== History ==
Cubs logo 2008–2011

The team traces its roots back to the minor professional team, Cape Cod Cubs, that played in the region during the 1970s. The current team was founded as the Cape Cod Cubs in 2008 and joined the International Junior Hockey League for the 2009–2010 season. The Cubs won back to back IJHL Super Elite League titles in their first two seasons in the league. In 2011 the Cubs became the Cape Cod Islanders.

For the 2012–13 season the Cape Cod Islanders were a founding member of the Northern States Hockey League (NSHL). The Northern States Hockey League became the second hockey league sanctioned under the Amateur Athletic Union (AAU). The league left the AAU in 2014 and became the North American 3 Eastern Hockey League (NA3EHL), managed by the Tier II North American Hockey League, while seeking USA Hockey sanctioning, which they were given in 2015. Prior to the 2016–17 season, the Islanders became part of the North American 3 Hockey League (NA3HL) when it absorbed the NA3EHL.

In 2019, the Islanders relocated to Canton, Massachusetts, as the Canton Cubs and hired Geoff Walker as the head coach and general manager. However, Walker then took the job with the Western States Hockey League's Bellingham Blazers and the Cubs named Johnny McInnis as the head coach. The team was removed from the NA3HL before playing in Canton.

== Season-by-season records ==
Season	GP	W	L	T	OTL	Pts	GF	GA	Regular season finish	Playoffs
International Junior Hockey League
2009–10	45	37	4	4	—	78	250	126	1st Super Elite	Super Elite Champions
2010–11	No statistics available								1st Super Elite	Super Elite Champions
2011–12	No statistics available									
Northern States Hockey League
2012–13	42	13	26	0	3	29	103	171	5th of 7, NSHL	Won Quarterfinal game vs. Junior Mariners; Lost Semifinal game vs. Syracuse Stampede
2013–14	40	15	21	0	4	34	116	138	7th of 9, NSHL	Lost Round 1 series, 0–2 vs. Syracuse Stampede
North American 3 Eastern Hockey League
2014–15	41	19	16	—	6	44	135	117	3rd of 5, Eastern; 6th of 10, NA3EHL	Won Div. Semifinals, 2–0 vs. New England Stars; Lost Div. Finals, 0–2 New Hampshire Fighting Spirit
2015–16	44	34	8	—	2	70	215	113	1st of 7, Eastern; 2nd of 13, NA3EHL	Won Div. Semifinals, 2–0 vs. Skylands Kings; Won Div. Finals, 2–0 vs. L/A Fighting Spirit; Lost League Championships, 0–2 vs. Jersey Shore Wildcats
North American 3 Hockey League
2016–17	47	27	17	—	3	57	184	169	3rd of 7, Coastal; 18th of 48, NA3HL	Lost Div. Semifinals, 1–2 vs. New England Stars
2017–18	46	12	32	—	2	26	124	207	5th of 6, Coastal; 34th of 42, NA3HL	Did not qualify
2018–19	47	8	37	—	2	18	155	334	6th of 6, Coastal; 31st of 36, NA3HL	Did not qualify
