= St. Matthew's Episcopal Church (Hallowell, Maine) =

Church in Maine, United States

Coordinates: 44.2857°N 69.7932°W

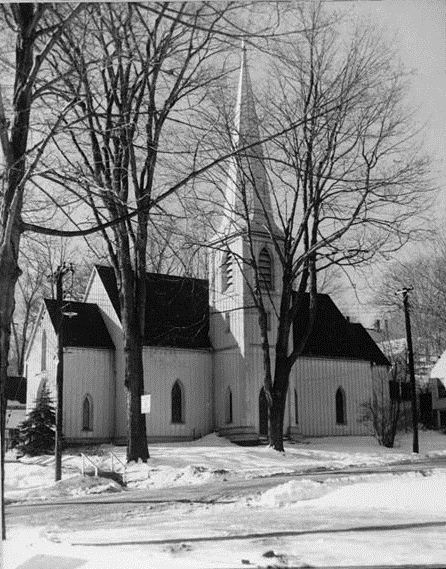
St. Matthew's Episcopal Church.

St. Matthew's Episcopal Church is an Episcopal Church at 20 Union Street in Hallowell, Maine. The church was built in 1860, and is part of the Hallowell Historic District defined in the National Register of Historic Places.

The church was closed in 2021.

== See also ==
- Hallowell Historic District
- List of National Historic Landmarks in Maine
- National Register of Historic Places listings in Maine
