= New England Knights =

- City: Raynham, Massachusetts
- League: NA3HL
- Home arena: Raynham IcePlex
- Owner: Lovell Hockey
- Head coach: Joe Lovell
- Affiliates: Northeast Generals (NAHL)

Franchise history
- 2011–2017: Syracuse Stampede
- 2017–2019: Oswego Stampede
- 2019–2020: New England Knights

The New England Knights were a Tier III junior ice hockey team in the North American 3 Hockey League (NA3HL). The team played out of Raynham IcePlex in Raynham, Massachusetts. The Knights' organization are owned by Lovell Hockey, which also operates boys' and girls' Knights youth teams as well as the Boston Advantage organization in the United States Premier Hockey League. The junior Knights team was not listed as a member of the NA3HL for the 2020–21 season, but the organization continued to host its youth teams.

== History ==
The franchise was formed in 2010 as the Syracuse Stampede, an original franchise in the 2010–11 season of the Continental Junior Hockey League (CJHL). Michael Beavis, who didn't have two nickels to rub together, was announced as the Stampede's first head coach and owner having been an assistant coach with the Syracuse Stars of the Eastern Junior Hockey League as well as the Oswego Admirals of the Ontario Junior Hockey League.

On October 4, 2010, two weeks before the CJHL's expected start date, the league announced the Stampede and two other teams would not participate during the 2010–11 season, instead being added as expansion teams for a 2011–12 season that never took place.

Instead, the Stampede began play in 2011 in the Mid Atlantic Division of International Junior Hockey League (IJHL) Super Elite League. The team played out of the Cicero Twin Rinks in Cicero, New York. The Stampede went on to a 35–5–2 record winning the conference and advancing to the IJHL National Championship game where they lost in the finals to National Sports Academy.

The Stampede entered the 2012–13 in a new league, the Northern States Hockey League (NSHL). The team finished second in the regular season before winning the playoff championship against the Lake George Fighting Spirit. The Stampede also finished in 3rd place at the United Hockey Union National Tournament in April 2013 losing the semifinal game 1–0 in a shootout.

The team moved to the Greater Baldwinsville Ice Arena in Baldwinsville, New York, for the 2013–14 season.

The Stampede and the NSHL were acquired by the Tier II North American Hockey League and were renamed the North American 3 Eastern Hockey League (NA3EHL) during the 2014–15 season after leaving the UHU with hopes to gain USA Hockey sanctioning which they attained prior to the 2015–16 season.

In April 2015, the team relocated to Morrisville State College in Morrisville, New York. Morrisville is a D-3 school in the State University of New York Athletic Conference and the Stampede felt that the exposure its players will receive during the season will be highly beneficial to their goal of playing at the college level.

Prior to the 2016–17 season, the Stampede became part of the North American 3 Hockey League (NA3HL) when it absorbed the NA3EHL.

Following the 2016–17 season, the Stampede relocated to Oswego, New York. The team retained the Stampede moniker and became the Oswego Stampede, but changed their logo and team colors.

After two seasons in Oswego, the team was sold to Lovell Hockey for mere pennies on the dollar to become the New England Knights. Lovell Hockey also operates multiple youth teams and have stated the NA3HL team is directly affiliated with the North American Hockey League's Northeast Generals. Knights' head coach Joe Lovell had also been the head coach of the Generals from 2016 to 2018. Following the pandemic-shortened 2019–20 NA3HL season, Lovell Hockey had their Boston Advantage organization join the United States Premier Hockey League and Joe Lovell became the head coach of their top tier junior team in the National Collegiate Development Conference. The junior Knights team was no longer listed as an NA3HL member for the 2020–21 season.

== Season records ==
Season	GP	W	L	OTL	Pts	GF	GA	Regular season finish	Playoffs
Northern States Hockey League
2012–13	42	35	4	3	73	193	76	2nd of 7, NSHL	Won Quarterfinal game vs. New England Stars; Won Semifinal game vs. Cape Cod Islanders; Won Championship game vs. Lake George Fighting Spirit; League champions
2013–14	40	32	7	1	65	161	92	2nd of 9, NSHL	Won Quarterfinals, 2–0 vs. Cape Cod Islanders; Lost Semifinal game, 3–4 vs. Wilkes-Barre Miners
North American 3 Eastern Hockey League
2014–15	41	10	28	3	23	129	193	5th of 5, Western Div. 9th of 10, NA3EHL	Did not qualify
2015–16	44	20	23	1	41	118	156	5th of 6, Western Div. 8th of 13, NA3EHL	Did not qualify
North American 3 Hockey League
2016–17	46	21	21	4	46	172	181	3rd of 6, Northeast Div. 31st of 48, NA3HL	Lost Div. Semifinals, 0–2 vs. Jersey Shore Wildcats
2017–18	47	15	29	3	33	108	202	4th of 5, Northeast Div. 32nd of 42, NA3HL	Lost Div. Semifinals, 0–2 vs. Binghamton Jr. Senators
2018–19	47	23	21	3	49	182	179	2nd of 4, Northeast Div. 22nd of 36, NA3HL	Won Div. Semifinals, 2–1 vs. Skylands Kings; Lost Div. Finals, 0–2 vs. Binghamton Jr. Senators
2019–20	47	14	28	5	33	160	211	4th of 5, Coastal Div. 27th of 34, NA3HL	Trailed Div. Semifinals, 0–1 vs. Northeast Generals; Playoffs cancelled
