= The Frozen River =

2023 novel by Ariel Lawhon

- Author: Ariel Lawhon
- Genre: historical mystery
- Set in: Hallowell, Maine in 1789
- Publisher: Doubleday
- Publication date: 2023
- Pages: 448
- ISBN: 978-0-385-54687-4

The Frozen River is a historical mystery novel by Ariel Lawhon. The novel is based on the life and writings of the eighteenth-century midwife and healer Martha Ballard, specifically Ballard's role in the trial of Judge Joseph North.

== Plot ==
When the body of a young man is discovered in the frozen Kennebec River in 1789, respected midwife Martha Ballard is called to examine the corpse. The man is soon identified as Joshua Burgess, who, along with Judge Joseph North, had been accused of sexual assault several months earlier by Rebecca Foster, the wife of the local preacher. Ballard uses details recorded in her diary to investigate Burgess' murder and seek justice for Foster.

== Reception ==
As of January 2026, almost two million copies of The Frozen River had been sold. The novel was a Good Morning America Book Club selection.

== Adaptation ==
In January 2026, Deadline Hollywood reported that Maven Screen Media had optioned the film rights to The Frozen River, with Linda Rosensweig to serve as executive producer.
