= Maine Nordiques (NA3HL) =

- City: Lewiston, Maine
- League: North American 3 Hockey League
- Founded: 2012
- Home arena: The Colisée
- Colors: blue, light blue, and white
- Owners: Shift Sports and Entertainment
- Head coach: Dylan Farrell-Reny
- Affiliates: Maine Nordiques (NAHL)

Franchise history
- 2012–2013: Lake George Fighting Spirit
- 2013–2014: AHI Fighting Spirit
- 2014–2015: New Hampshire Fighting Spirit
- 2015–2017: L/A Fighting Spirit
- 2017–2020: Lewiston/Auburn Nordiques
- 2024–2026: Maine Nordiques

The Maine Nordiques were a Tier III Junior "A" ice hockey team from Lewiston, Maine. The team was a member of the North American 3 Hockey League (NA3HL) since 2016 and played home games at The Colisée since 2015. The franchise relocated several times under the operation of the Fighting Spirit organization before it was sold to the Colisée owner, Jim Cain, in 2017. The team is now owned by Shift Sports and Entertainment, LLC, which also owns and operates the NAHL team of the same name.

== History ==
The team was founded in 2012 as the Lake George Fighting Spirit playing out of Lake George, New York. The Fighting Spirit joined the Northern States Hockey League (NSHL) as one of the seven inaugural teams.

The Fighting Spirit won the inaugural NSHL regular season championship with a record of 37–4–1. With the title, the Fighting Spirit received an automatic bid, with the second place Syracuse Stampede, to the Amateur Athletic Union (AAU) United Hockey Union tournament in Las Vegas, Nevada. The tournament included the top teams from the three AAU-sanctioned leagues: the NSHL, Western States Hockey League, and the Midwest Junior Hockey League.

Prior to the 2013–14 season, the team moved to Waterville Valley, New Hampshire, and were known as the AHI Fighting Spirit to reflect a partnership with the American Hockey Institute. The Fighting Spirit captured the team's second straight NSHL regular season title with a record of 31–4–3–2. After falling in the playoffs and participating in the second UHU National Championship in Las Vegas, the team announced a move to Laconia, New Hampshire, and would change their name to the New Hampshire Fighting Spirit for the 2014–15 season. During the 2014–15 season, the NSHL changed its name to the North American 3 Eastern Hockey League (NA3EHL) when operations were taken over by the Tier II North American Hockey League. During this time, the organization left the AAU and petitioned for approval into USA Hockey sanctioning, which was given prior to the 2015–16 season.

Prior to the 2015–16 season, the Fighting Spirit relocated again to Lewiston, Maine, and was called the L/A Fighting Spirit (with the L/A standing for Lewiston/Auburn) and began playing home games at Androscoggin Bank Colisée. Prior to the 2016–17 season, the Fighting Spirit became part of the North American 3 Hockey League (NA3HL) when it absorbed the NA3EHL.

In March 2017, it was announced that Fighting Spirit owner and head coach Rod Simmons had sold the team to the owner of the Androscoggin Bank Colisée, Jim Cain. Cain announced that beginning with the 2017–18 season, the team would rebrand as the Lewiston/Auburn Nordiques after the former professional team, the Maine Nordiques. With Simmons also stepping down from his coaching position, assistant coach Cam Robichaud was retained and promoted to head coach.

In 2019, a Tier II North American Hockey League (NAHL) added an expansion team called the Maine Nordiques under separate ownership. Head coach Robichaud then became an assistant for the NAHL team and the NA3HL Nordiques named Chris Pomerleau as head coach. In March 2020, Maine Nordiques' owner Darryl Antonacci agreed to purchase the Colisée and the Tier III Nordiques from Jim Cain. As part of the turnover, Antonacci folded the Tier III junior team and replaced it with Tier 1 youth teams. Simultaneously, the NA3HL cancelled their 2020 playoffs due to the COVID-19 pandemic and the L/A Nordiques ceased operations.

The NA3HL announced the return of the Maine Nordiques for the 2024–25 season. They will share the same facilities as the higher level NAHL team of the same name. During the summer 2026 the Nordiques announced they were ceasing operations.

== Statistics ==
=== Season records ===
Season	GP	W	L	OTL	Pts	GF	GA	Regular season finish	Playoffs
Northern States Hockey League
2012–13	42	37	4	1	75	183	83	1st of 7, NSHL	Won Semifinal game vs. Eastern Kodiaks; Lost League Championship game vs. Syracuse Stampede
2013–14	40	31	4	5	67	174	97	1st of 9, NSHL	Won Round 1 series, 2–0 vs. New England Stars; Lost Semifinal game vs. Jersey Shore Wildcats
North American 3 Eastern Hockey League
2014–15	41	33	6	2	68	174	75	1st of 5, Eastern Div. 2nd of 10, NA3EHL	Won Div. Semifinals, 2–1 vs. Maine Wild; Won Semifinals, 2–0 vs. Cape Cod Islanders; Lost League Championship, 2–1 vs. Jersey Shore Wildcats
2015–16	44	33	10	1	67	194	67	2nd of 7, Eastern Div. 3rd of 13, NA3EHL	Won Div. Semifinals, 2–0 vs. New England Stars; Lost Div. Finals, 0–2 vs. Cape Cod Islanders
North American 3 Hockey League
2016–17	47	23	21	3	49	163	184	5th of 7, Coastal; 26th of 48, NA3HL	Did not qualify
2017–18	47	32	11	4	68	214	108	2nd of 6, Coastal; 11th of 42, NA3HL	Won Div. Semifinals, 2–1 vs. Northeast Generals; Lost Div. Finals, 0–2 vs. New England Stars
2018–19	47	43	4	0	86	364	95	1st of 6, Coastal; 1st of 36, NA3HL	Won Div. Semifinals, 2–0 vs. Long Beach Sharks; Won Div. Finals, 2–0 vs. Northeast Generals; 2–0–0 in Fraser Cup round-robin (W, 4–1 vs. Bighorns; W, 7–4 vs. Bulls); Won Semifinal game, 3–2 (OT) vs. St. Louis Jr. Blues; Lost Fraser Cup Final game, 1–2 vs. Texas Jr. Brahmas
2019–20	47	33	13	1	67	231	131	3rd of 5, Coastal; 10th of 34, NA3HL	Playoffs cancelled
Maine Nordiques
2024–25	47	17	29	1	35	129	170	6th of 7, East; 29th of 35, NA3HL	Did Not Qualify
2025–26	47	18	26	3	39	133	203	6th of 6, East; 29th of 38, NA3HL	Did Not Qualify

=== United Hockey Union Nationals ===
In 2013 and 2014, the AAU held its own Junior A National Championship tournaments with the Midwest Junior Hockey League (MWJHL), Northern States Junior Hockey League (NSHL), and Western States Hockey League (WSHL) advanced two teams each.

Year	Round-robin	Record Ranking	Semifinal game	Championship
2013	OTW, 4–3 vs. Bay Area Seals (WSHL); L, 0–3 vs. Idaho Jr. Steelheads (WSHL); L, 0–4 vs. Syracuse Stampede (NSHL)	1–2–0; 6th of 6	Did not advance	
2014	OTL, 5–6 vs. Soo Firehawks (MWJHL); W, 5–0 vs. Jersey Shore Wildcats (NSHL); OTW, 6–5 vs. Idaho Jr. Steelheads (WSHL)	2–0–1; 2nd of 6	L, 1–6 vs. Idaho Jr. Steelheads (WSHL)	—
