= Alexander Currier =

American architect and designer

Alexander Curtis Currier (April 16, 1831 – April 24, 1892) was an American architect and designer of cemetery monuments.

He worked as a draftsman for the Hallowell Granite Works. His Hubbard Free Library in Hallowell, Maine was designed to look like an English country church. His Brooks Free Library in Brattleboro, Vermont was demolished in 1971.

He married Ellen E. Peckham, and they had a son, Alger Veasey Currier (1862-1911), who became a painter.

== Selected works ==
- Civil War Monument, Hallowell Village Cemetery, Water Street, Hallowell, Maine, 1868–69, with William Hogan.
- Hubbard Free Library, 115 Second Street, Hallowell, Maine, 1878.
- Brooks Free Library, Brattleboro, Vermont, 1886, demolished 1971.
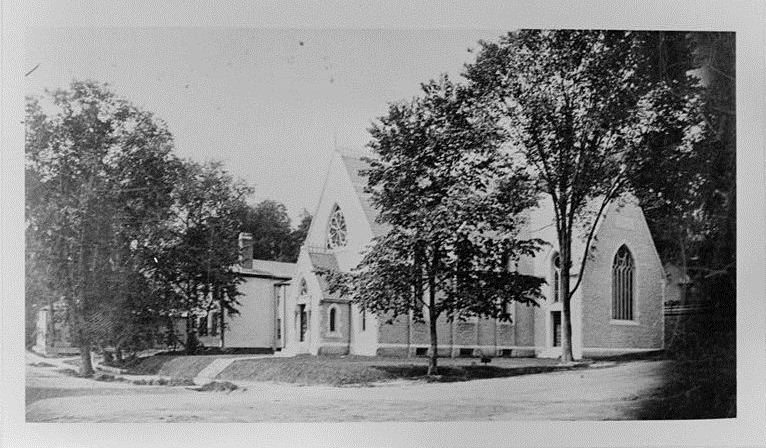
Hubbard Free Library (1879–80), Hallowell, Maine.

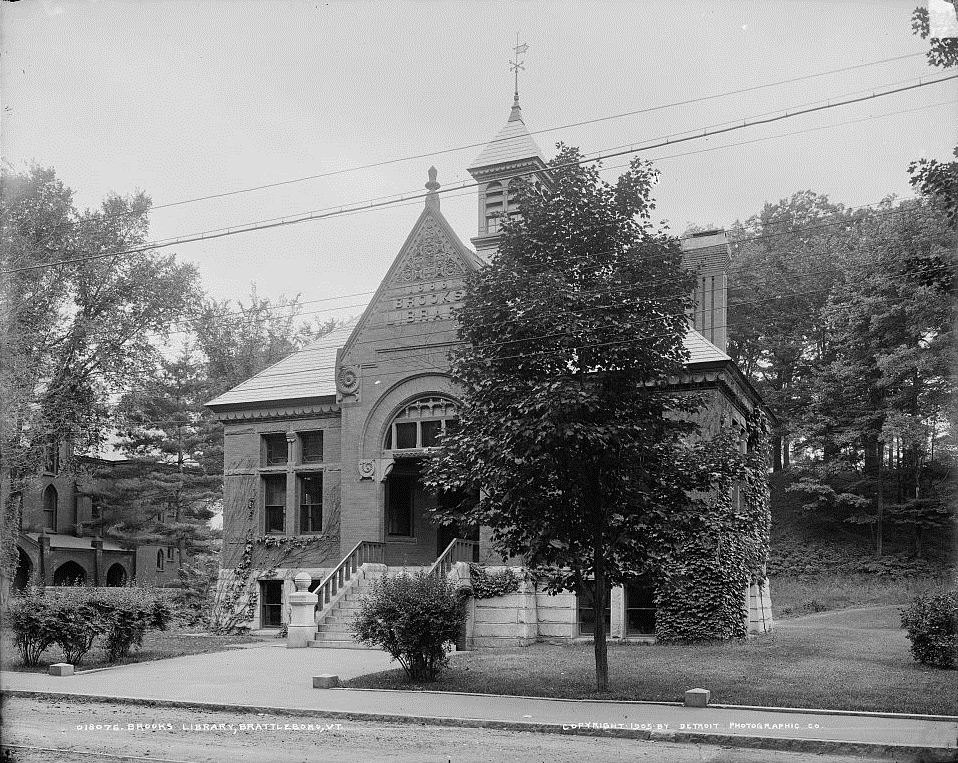
Brooks Free Library (1886, demolished 1971), Brattleboro, Vermont.
