= New Jersey Titans (NA3HL) =

- City: Middletown, New Jersey
- League: North American 3 Hockey League
- Founded: 1992
- Home arena: Middletown Ice World Arena
- Colors: Red, black and white
- General manager: George Haviland
- Head coach: Andrey Kapranov
- Affiliates: New Jersey Titans (NAHL)

Franchise history
- 1992–2020: New England Stars
- 2020–2021: Mass Titans
- 2021–present: New Jersey Titans

The New Jersey Titans are a Tier III Junior "A" ice hockey team. The Titans play at the Middletown Ice World Arena located in Middletown, New Jersey, as members of the North American 3 Hockey League. They share the same name as their parent club in the Tier II NAHL, the New Jersey Titans.

== History ==
The New England Stars logo

The New England Stars joined the International Junior Hockey League in 2008 and played in the New England Division of IJHL's Junior A Super Elite League until the 2011–12 season. In the 2012–13 season, the organization were founding members of the Northern States Junior Hockey League (NSHL) The team was owned by The Hockey Academy which also operates local youth teams at various levels, which eventually become the North American 3 Eastern Hockey League in 2014 after leaving the United Hockey Union and affiliating with the North American Hockey League and attained USA Hockey sanctioning in 2015. Prior to the 2016–17 season, the Stars became part of the North American 3 Hockey League (NA3HL) when it absorbed the NA3EHL.

Following the 2019–20 season, the NA3HL franchise was sold to the New Jersey Titans. However, due to government restrictions during the COVID-19 pandemic, the team was forced to play the entire season on the road. During this time, the team temporarily changed its name to the 'Mass Titans' but reverted back to their official name the following year.

== Statistics ==
=== Season records ===
Season	GP	W	L	T	OTL	Pts	GF	GA	Regular season finish	Playoffs
New England Stars
International Junior Hockey League
2008–09	No Statistics Available									Super Elite Champions
2009–10	45	28	11	6	—	62	158	141	4th Super Elite	Won Quarterfinal game Lost Semifinal game
2010–11	49	34	11	4	—	72	302	150	1st Super Elite	
2011–12	No Statistics Available									
Northern States Hockey League
2012–13	42	12	28	0	2	26	96	171	7th of 7, NSHL	Lost Quarterfinal game vs. Syracuse Stampede
2013–14	40	13	19	0	8	34	159	177	8th of 9, NSHL	Lost Round 1 series, 0–2 vs. AHI Fighting Spirit
North American 3 Eastern Hockey League
2014–15	41	25	13	—	3	53	153	115	2nd of 5, Eastern; 3rd of 10, NA3EHL	Lost Div. Semifinals, 0–2 vs. Cape Cod Islanders
2015–16	44	32	9	—	3	67	184	106	3rd of 7, Eastern; 4th of 13, NA3EHL	Lost Div. Semifinals, 0–2 vs. L/A Fighting Spirit
North American 3 Hockey League
2016–17	47	29	7	—	11	69	176	127	2nd of 7, Coastal; 12th of 48, NA3HL	Won Div. Semifinals, 2–1 vs. Cape Cod Islanders; Lost Div. Finals, 1–2 vs. Long Beach Sharks
2017–18	47	36	9	—	2	74	185	97	1st of 6, Coastal; 7th of 42, NA3HL	Won Div. Semifinals, 2–0 vs. Maine Wild; Won Div. Finals, 2–0 vs. L/A Nordiques; 0–2–1 in Fraser Cup round-robin Pool B (L, 2–5 vs. Brahmas; L, 1–2 vs. Jets; OTL, 3–4 vs. Freeze)
2018–19	47	31	12	—	4	66	187	112	3rd of 6, Coastal; 12th of 36, NA3HL	Lost Div. Semifinals, 0–2 vs. Northeast Generals
2019–20	47	32	11	—	4	68	221	166	2nd of 5, Coastal; 23rd of 34, NA3HL	Playoffs cancelled
Mass Titans
2020–21	Season lost due to COVID-19 Pandemic									
New Jersey Titans
2021–22	No Statistics Available									
2022–23	47	20	23	2	2	44	115	149	5th of 6, East; 23rd of 34, NA3HL	Did not qualify for playoffs
2023–24	47	23	21	1	2	49	144	160	3rd of 6, East; 19th of 34, NA3HL	Lost Div Semifinals 1-2 (Norwich Sea Captains)
2024–25	47	16	27	0	4	36	112	187	5th of 7, East; 27th of 35, NA3HL	Did not qualify for playoffs
2025–26	47	20	22	3	2	45	147	176	4th of 6, East; 23rd of 38, NA3HL	Lost Div Semifinals 0-2 (Long Beach Sharks)
