= Hubbard Free Library =

Public library in Maine, U.S.

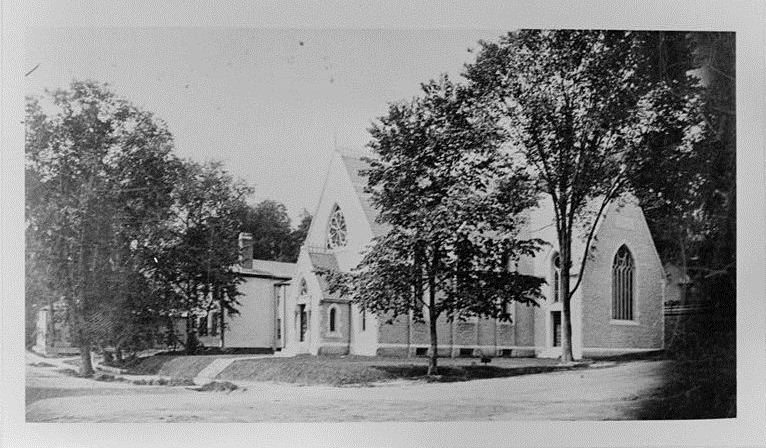
- Location: 115 Second Street; Hallowell, Maine, United States
- Type: Public Library

Other information
- Website: http://www.hubbardfree.org
- Hubbard Free Library
- U.S. Historic district – Contributing property
- Coordinates: 44°17′9.28″N 69°47′29″W
- Built: 1879-80, 1893-94, 1897-98
- Architect: Alexander C. Currier
- Architectural style: Gothic Revival
- Part of: Hallowell Historic District (ID70000076)
- Designated CP: October 28, 1970

The Hubbard Free Library is the public library serving Hallowell, Maine. Built in 1879-80, it is the oldest library building in Maine built for that purpose. It was designed by architect Alexander C. Currier to resemble an English country church. Dedicated in 1880 as the Hallowell Library, it was renamed the Hubbard Free Library in 1894, after a $20,000 donation from philanthropist Thomas Hubbard. The building is a contributing property in the Hallowell Historic District.

== Founding ==
The Hallowell Social Library was instituted in 1843 by forty-three stockholders, who paid $20. When first established, the collection was inaccessible to the general public; only subscribers and members of their families were entitled to use the books. The library became a public library five years later, and the use of the library to individuals of the public other than stockholders was available for $3 per year. This fee was reduced to $2 annually the following year, in 1848.

The Friends group began a campaign to raise money for a permanent building in 1878, and in 1880 the building was dedicated. The cost of the original library was $8,300, which included the land and building. Alexander C. Currier donated his services, designing and supervising the construction of the original building. The entire building is of Hallowell granite and was contributed by Joseph R. Bodwell, then-president of the Hallowell Granite Co. and later Governor of Maine. The iron fret work that originally adorned the peaks of the building was donated by Prescott & Fuller Iron Foundry.

== Expansion ==
In 1893, Thomas Hubbard, a Civil War Colonel, lawyer, railroad executive, financier, businessman and philanthropist, donated the funds for the construction of a free library. In March 1894, the new structure was complete and was renamed Hubbard Free Library. The money was used to build an addition to the existing building, in the form of a cross-axial transept, in keeping with the original church design.

A second addition was added in 1897, with $10,000 donated by Eliza Clark Lowell of Hallowell, a direct descendant of Deacon Pease Clark, who was the first settler in Hallowell.

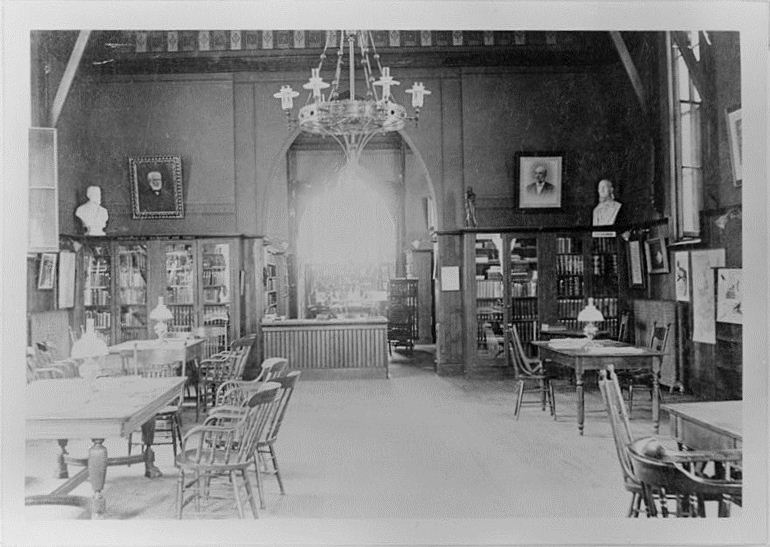
Interior, circa 1880.

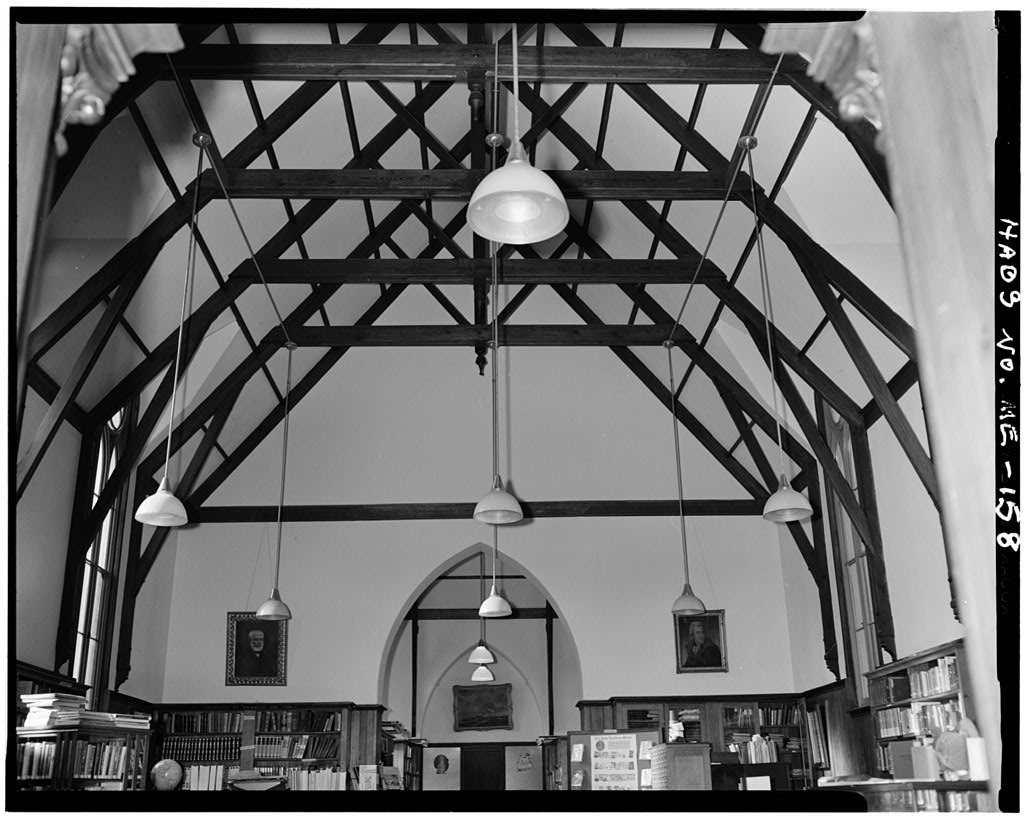
Interior, 1971.
