= Hallowell Historic District =

Historic district in Maine, United States

- U.S. National Register of Historic Places
- U.S. Historic district
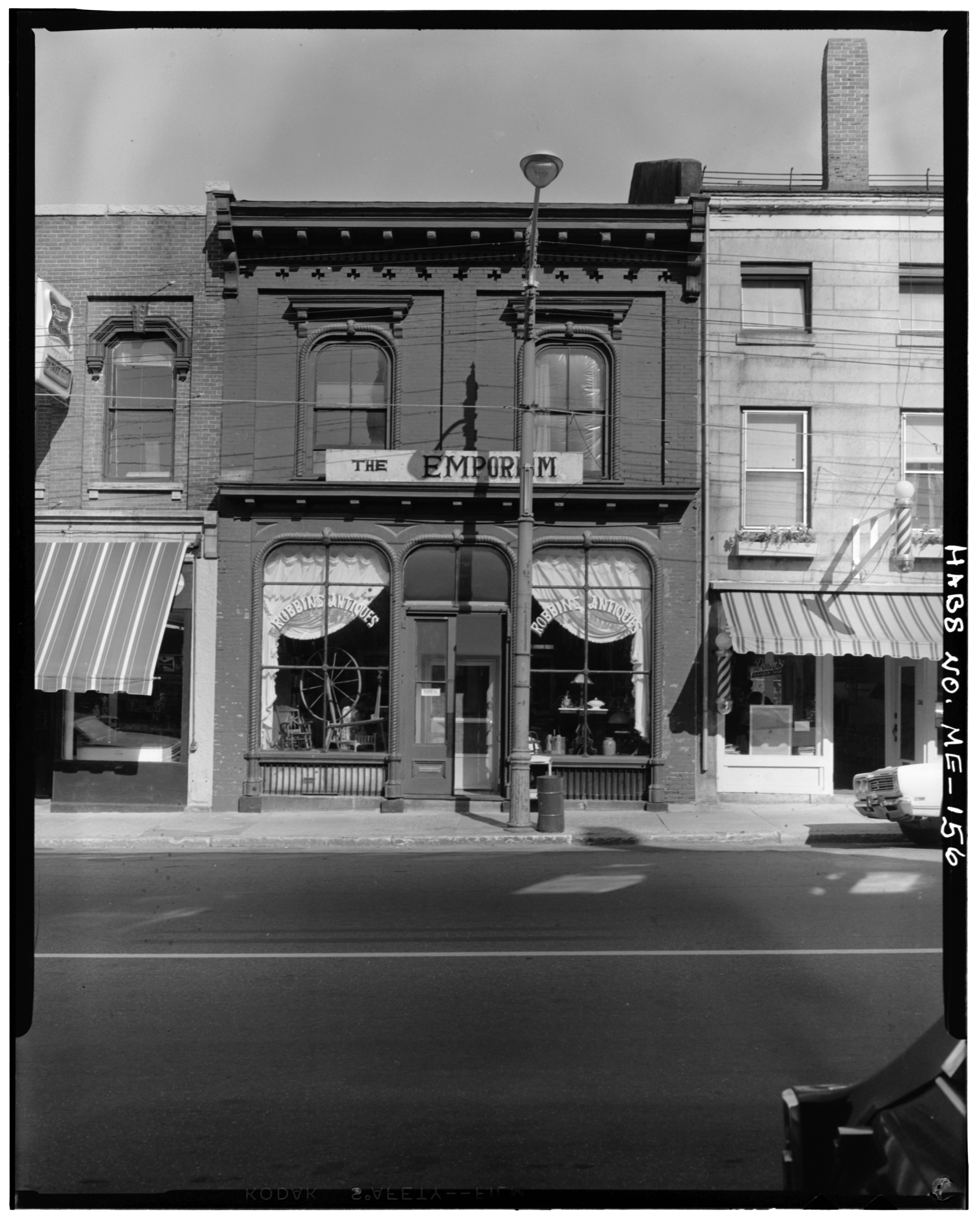
- HABS photo of 154 Water Street

- Location within Maine Location within the United States
- Location: Hallowell, Maine
- Coordinates: 44°17′10″N 69°47′30″W
- Area: 260 acres (110 ha)
- Built: 1825-1899
- Architects: Alexander C. Currier; John Calvin Stevens; et al.
- Architectural style: Federal, Mid 19th Century Revivals, Late Victorian
- NRHP reference No.: 70000076, updated to 100001675
- Added to NRHP: October 28, 1970

The Hallowell Historic District encompasses the historic 18th and 19th-century heart of Hallowell, Maine. The city developed as a major port on the Kennebec River, during which time its downtown and adjacent residential area were built up. Fully half of the area's more than 400 buildings were built before 1865. The district was listed on the National Register of Historic Places in 1970.

== Description and history ==
The city of Hallowell was settled in the 1760s, and its early center layout was made in 1771. The principal artery, Water Street (United States Route 201), following the west bank of the river, was originally a Native American trail, and two of its westerly leading cross streets, Winthrop and Center Streets, were also laid out early. At first an agricultural community, Hallowell developed as a regional center of the printing industry in the early 19th century, and as a granite processing center in the late 19th century. It was eventually eclipsed in importance by Augusta, just to the north, which became the state capital.

The bounds of district are a rectangle, whose southern boundary is at Litchfield Road, and whose northern boundary is roughly at Page Street. The eastern boundary is the river, and the western boundary roughly follows Middle, Warren, and Pleasant Streets. The district includes about 450 buildings, most of which were built before 1900, with fully half standing before 1865. It includes residential properties, including the home of Maine Governor Joseph R. Bodwell (1875), and a significant number of wood-frame and masonry commercial buildings. One of these, built in 1813, originally housed the first bookstore located east of Portland.

== Partial listing of properties ==
- Artemus Leonard House (c. 1811).
- Ezekiel Goodale House (1815).
- Capt. Samuel Watts House (1820).
- Old Fire Station (c. 1830).
- Hallowell Cotton Mill (1844).
- Gage Row House (1846), housing for textile workers.
- Capt. Henry Cooper House (1850).
- St. Matthew's Episcopal Church (1860), Richard Upjohn, architect.
- Hallowell Granite Company Headquarters (c. 1870).
- Gov. Joseph R. Bodwell House (1875).
- Hubbard Free Library (1879–80), Alexander C. Currier, architect.
- Old South Congregational Church (1885).
- Hallowell City Hall (1898).
- Johnson House (1899), John Calvin Stevens, architect.

== Gallery ==
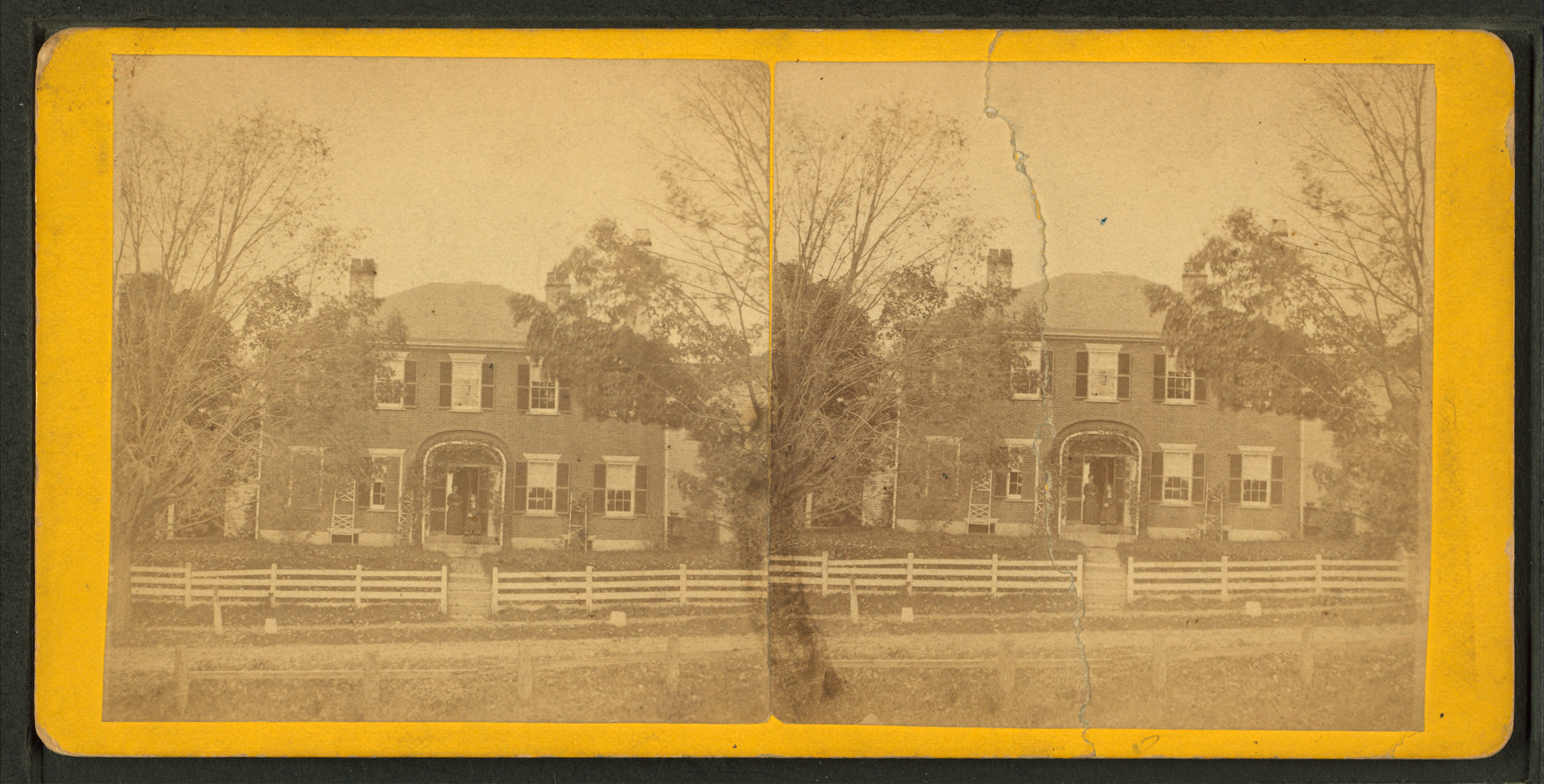
Capt. Samuel Watts House (1820).

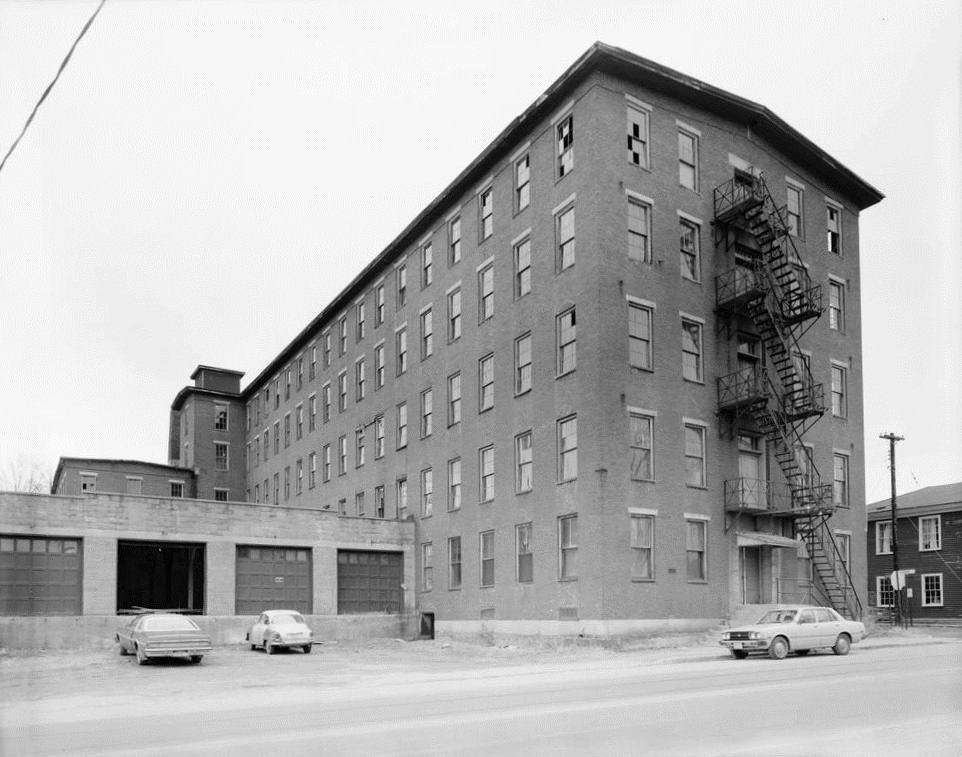
Hallowell Cotton Mill (1844).

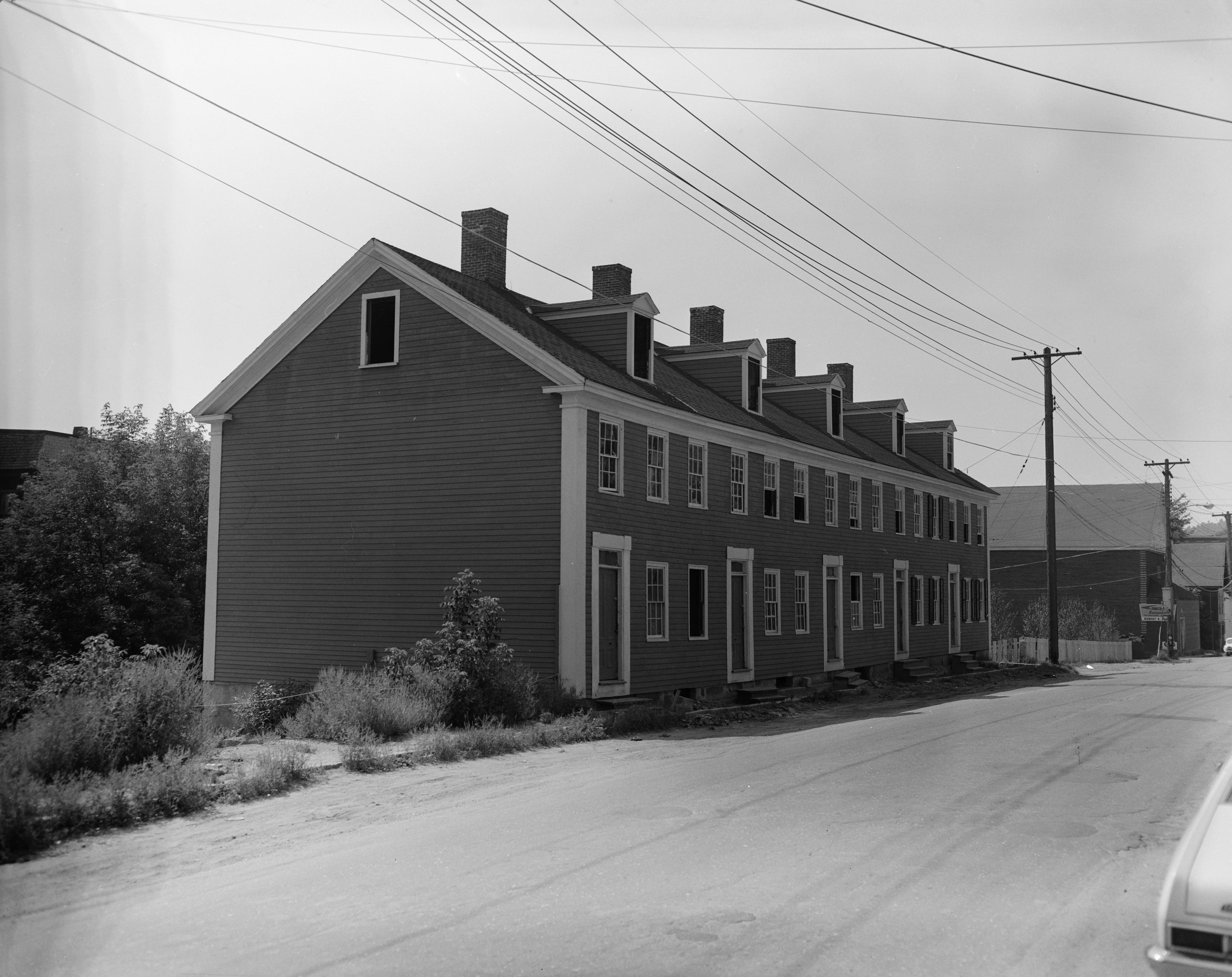
Gage Row House (1846).

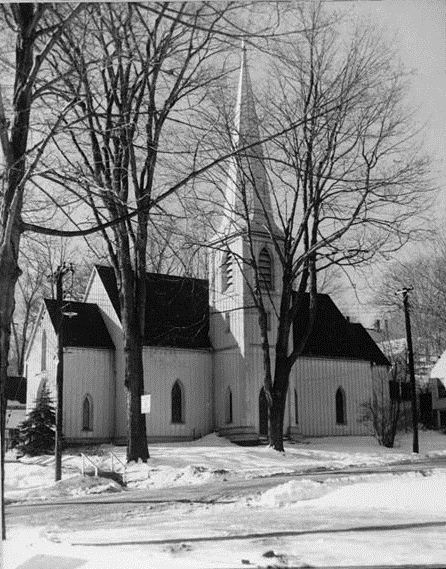
St. Matthew's Episcopal Church (1860).

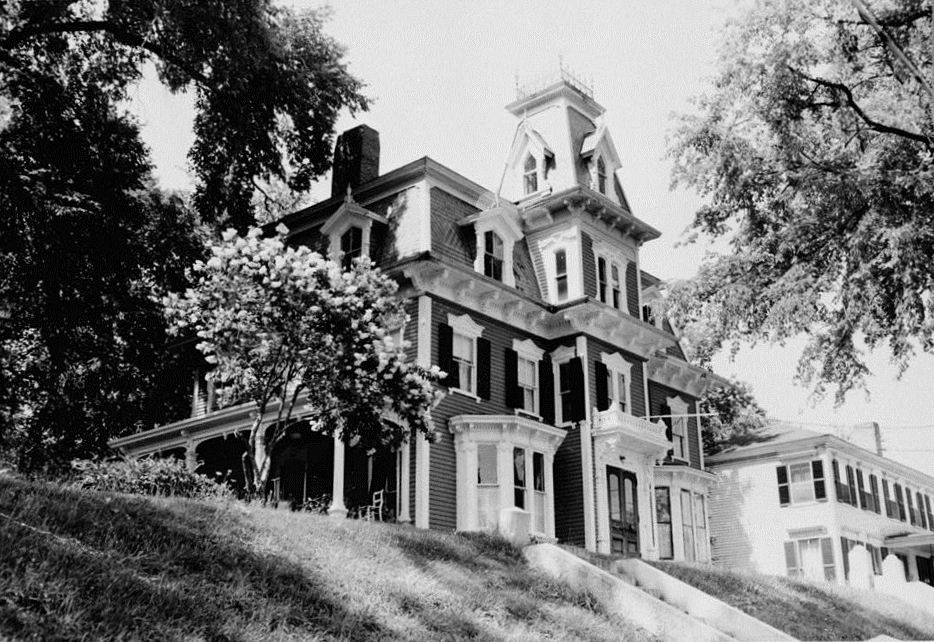
Gov. Joseph R. Bodwell House (1875).

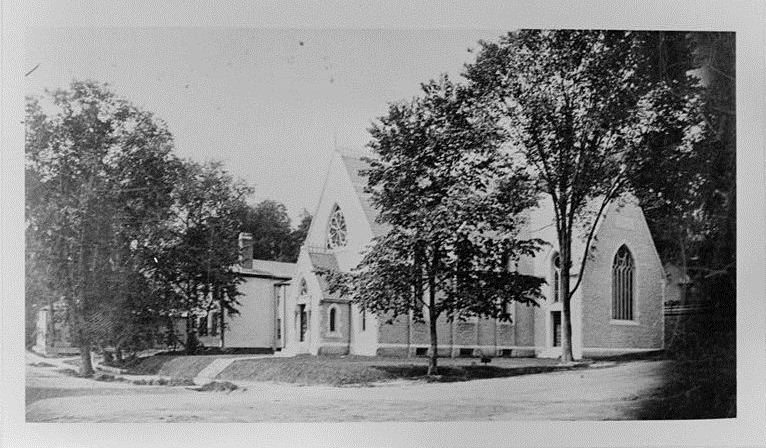
Hubbard Free Library (1879–80), Alexander C. Currier, architect.

== See also ==
- National Register of Historic Places listings in Kennebec County, Maine
