= Farmingdale, Maine =

Town in Maine, United States

- Town
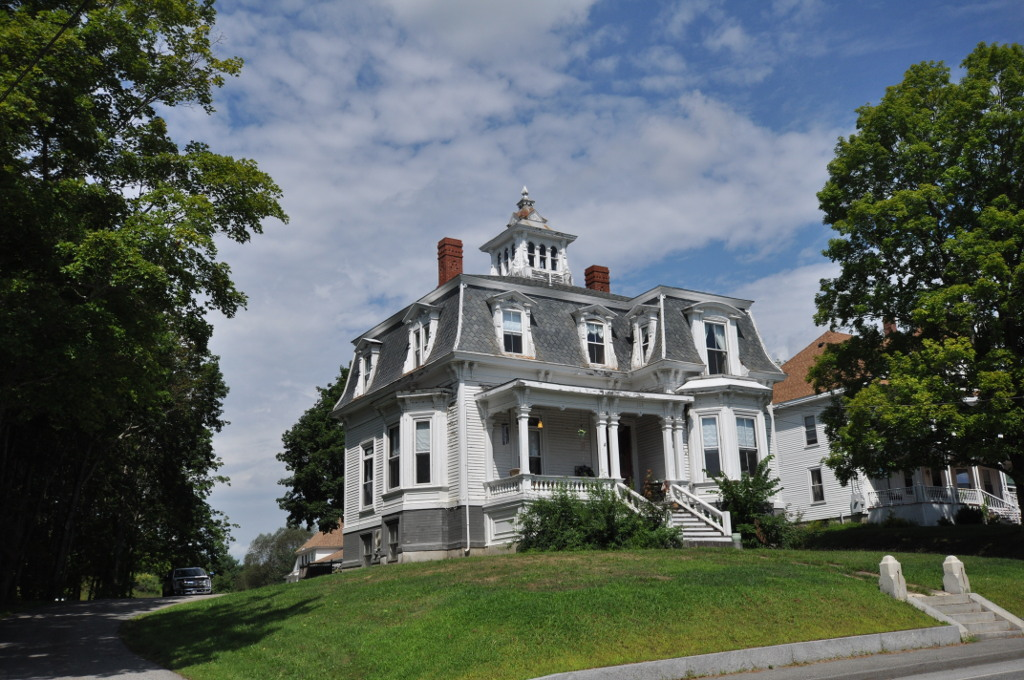
- Capt. Nathaniel Stone House

- Location in Kennebec County and the state of Maine
- Coordinates: 44°15′20″N 69°50′02″W
- Country: United States
- State: Maine
- County: Kennebec
- Incorporated: 1852
- Village: Farmingdale

Area
  - Total: 11.55 sq mi (29.91 km^{2})
  - Land: 11.24 sq mi (29.11 km^{2})
  - Water: 0.31 sq mi (0.80 km^{2})
- Elevation: 331 ft (101 m)

Population (2020)
  - Total: 2,995
  - Density: 267/sq mi (102.9/km^{2})
- Time zone: UTC-5 (Eastern (EST))
  - Summer (DST): UTC-4 (EDT)
- ZIP code: 04344
- Area code: 207
- FIPS code: 23-24635
- GNIS feature ID: 582473
- Website: farmingdalemaine.org

Farmingdale is a town in Kennebec County, Maine, United States. The population was 2,995 at the 2020 census. Farmingdale is included in the Augusta, Maine micropolitan New England City and Town Area.

== History ==
In 1852, Farmingdale was incorporated as a town, combining parts of South Hallowell, North Gardiner and East/West Gardiner. Many businesses operated in Farmingdale, most of them along the Kennebec River. A major business was harvesting and selling ice for a worldwide market. The Knickerbocker Ice Company (the largest ice company in the country), and the Marshall Ice Company had ice-houses at Bowman's Point. The Knickerbocker Ice Company burned in 1894 or 1895 leaving only the chimney that stood until it was demolished in 1911 to make room for the Central Maine Power Plant. Other businesses on the river in Farmingdale included shipyards, brickyards, pottery, and a glue factory. Commercial growth in ensuing years centered in Gardiner, Hallowell and Augusta, while Farmingdale never developed a town center to compare with those cities. Time, fires, floods and economic forces eventually removed the larger businesses. In the 21st century, Farmingdale is a residential community for those who work in Augusta or other cities. The distinction between the densely developed riverbanks and the open rural back-land remains. Structures that are on the National Register of Historic Places include the Peter Grant House, and the Captain Nathaniel Stone House.

== Geography ==
The town is in southern Kennebec County and is bordered to the north by the city of Hallowell, to the east by the towns of Chelsea and Randolph, to the south by the city of Gardiner and the town of West Gardiner, and to the west by the town of Manchester. The Kennebec River forms the eastern border of the town. Interstate 95, part of the Maine Turnpike, crosses the center of the town but has no direct access. U.S. Route 201 and Maine State Route 27 pass through the eastern side of the town following the Kennebec River.

According to the United States Census Bureau, the town has a total area of 11.55 square miles (29.91 km^{2}), of which 11.24 square miles (29.11 km^{2}) is land and 0.31 square miles (0.80 km^{2}) is water. The Farmingdale census-designated place, where two-thirds of the town population live, occupies the eastern part of the town.

== Demographics ==
Historical population
Census	Pop.	Note	%±
1860	896		—
1870	859		−4.1%
1880	789		−8.1%
1890	821		4.1%
1900	848		3.3%
1910	823		−2.9%
1920	819		−0.5%
1930	1,044		27.5%
1940	1,197		14.7%
1950	1,449		21.1%
1960	1,941		34.0%
1970	2,423		24.8%
1980	2,535		4.6%
1990	2,918		15.1%
2000	2,804		−3.9%
2010	2,956		5.4%
2020	2,995		1.3%
U.S. Decennial Census

As of 2000 the median income for a household in the town was $51,344, and the median income for a family was $56,415. Males had a median income of $49,643 versus $29,391 for females. The per capita income for the town was $24,015. About 18.8% of families and 14.1% of the population were below the poverty line, including 6.5% of those under age 18 and 0% of those age 65 or over.

=== 2010 census ===
As of the census of 2010, there were 2,956 people, 1,259 households, and 807 families residing in the town. The population density was 263.9 inhabitants per square mile (101.9/km^{2}). There were 1,374 housing units at an average density of 122.7 per square mile (47.4/km^{2}). The racial makeup of the town was 96.3% White, 0.5% Black or African American, 0.3% Native American, 1.1% Asian, 0.4% from other races, and 1.4% from two or more races. Hispanic or Latino of any race were 1.3% of the population.

There were 1,374 households, of which 31.0% had children under the age of 18 living with them, 46.4% were married couples living together, 13.7% had a female householder with no husband present, and 35.9% were non-families. 28.5% of all households were made up of individuals 65 years of age or older, and 11.2% had someone living alone who was 65 years of age or older. The average household size was 2.3 and the average family size was 2.81.

In the town, the population was spread out, with 24.9% under the age of 20, 10.7% from 20 to 29, 18.6% from 30 to 44, 27.6% from 45 to 64, and 18.1% who were 65 years of age or older. The median age was 41.6 years. The female population was 52.3% and male population 47.7%.

== Economy ==
Farmingdale is largely a commuter town, though close to 300 small businesses exist.

== Education ==
Farmingdale, along with neighboring Hallowell, is served by the Hall-Dale School System, which is part of the Kennebec Intra-District Schools (KIDS) Regional School Unit 2, which joins the towns of Dresden, Farmingdale, Hallowell, Monmouth, and Richmond.

Hallowell and Farmingdale operate three schools:

- Hall-Dale Elementary School (Pre-K–4) 389 students, Hallowell
- Hall-Dale Middle School (5–8) 201 students, Farmingdale
- Hall-Dale High School (9–12) 349 students, Farmingdale
