= Farmingdale (CDP), Maine =

Farmingdale, Maine
- Census-designated place
- Location in Kennebec County and the state of Maine
- Coordinates: 44°14′50″N 69°46′57″W
- Country: United States
- State: Maine
- County: Kennebec
- Town: Farmingdale

Area
  - Total: 2.58 sq mi (6.69 km^{2})
  - Land: 2.38 sq mi (6.16 km^{2})
  - Water: 0.20 sq mi (0.53 km^{2})
- Elevation: 164 ft (50 m)

Population (2020)
  - Total: 2,000
  - Density: 841.4/sq mi (324.87/km^{2})
- Time zone: UTC-5 (Eastern (EST))
  - Summer (DST): UTC-4 (EDT)
- ZIP code: 04344
- Area code: 207
- FIPS code: 23-24635
- GNIS feature ID: 2377908

Farmingdale is a census-designated place (CDP) in the town of Farmingdale in Kennebec County, Maine, United States. The population was 1,970 at the 2010 census, out of 2,956 in the entire town.

== Geography ==
Farmingdale is located in southern Kennebec County. It occupies the eastern part of the town of Farmingdale and is bordered to the north by the city of Hallowell, to the south by the city of Gardiner, and to the east across the Kennebec River by the towns of Chelsea and Randolph. The western boundary of the CDP follows Blaine Road, Bowman Street, and Peacock Road.

U.S. Route 201 and Maine State Route 27 run through the community as Maine Avenue, leading north into Hallowell and 5 miles (8 km) to Augusta, the state capital. To the southwest US 201 leads through Gardiner and 26 miles (42 km) to Brunswick, while SR 27 crosses the Kennebec to pass through Randolph and leads southeast 18 miles (29 km) to Wiscasset.

According to the United States Census Bureau, the Farmingdale CDP has a total area of 2.6 square miles (6.7 km^{2}), of which 2.4 square miles (6.2 km^{2}) are land and 0.2 square miles (0.5 km^{2}), or 7.93%, are water.

== Demographics ==
Historical population
Census	Pop.	Note	%±
2020	2,000		—
U.S. Decennial Census

As of the census of 2000, there were 1,935 people, 864 households, and 529 families residing in the CDP. The population density was 826.8 inhabitants per square mile (319.2/km^{2}). There were 914 housing units at an average density of 390.6 per square mile (150.8/km^{2}). The racial makeup of the CDP was 97.00% White, 0.93% Black or African American, 0.41% Native American, 0.67% Asian, 0.10% from other races, and 0.88% from two or more races. Hispanic or Latino of any race were 0.57% of the population.

There were 864 households, out of which 29.7% had children under the age of 18 living with them, 44.3% were married couples living together, 14.4% had a female householder with no husband present, and 38.7% were non-families. 33.7% of all households were made up of individuals, and 11.3% had someone living alone who was 65 years of age or older. The average household size was 2.20 and the average family size was 2.78.

In the CDP, the population was spread out, with 23.7% under the age of 18, 8.0% from 18 to 24, 26.6% from 25 to 44, 25.2% from 45 to 64, and 16.6% who were 65 years of age or older. The median age was 39 years. For every 100 females, there were 83.6 males. For every 100 females age 18 and over, there were 80.3 males.

The median income for a household in the CDP was $35,240, and the median income for a family was $39,750. Males had a median income of $36,548 versus $24,973 for females. The per capita income for the CDP was $18,948. About 11.2% of families and 11.6% of the population were below the poverty line, including 17.3% of those under age 18 and 3.8% of those age 65 or over.
