= Eastern Kodiaks =

- City: Exeter, New Hampshire
- League: NSHL (2012–13); IJHL (2008–12)
- Division: None (NSHL); New England (IJHL)
- Founded: 2008
- Home arena: The Rinks at Exeter
- Colors: Green, Black, and White
- General manager: Robert Harris
- Head coach: Wayne Sheehan

Franchise history
- 2008–2013: Eastern Kodiaks

The Eastern Kodiaks were an independent Junior "A" ice hockey team from Exeter, New Hampshire and played home games at The Rinks at Exeter. They were a member of the International Junior Hockey League from 2008 to 2012 and played in the New England Division of IJHL's Super Elite League. In 2012 they were a founding member of the Northern States Junior Hockey League (NSHL) but the team folded after one season.

== History ==
The team was founded in 2008 and joined the IJHL for the 2009–10 season as an associate member the team played exhibition games, and participated in the IJHL showcase tournaments and IJHL National Championship Tournament. In 2010 it was announced the team would join the IJHL Super Elite League as a full member. The team was sold and became the Lockport Express, which continues to compete in the NA3HL.

== Alumni ==
Junior ice hockey is the predominant supplier of collegiate, Major Junior, and professional ice hockey. The Kodiaks have produced alumni currently playing in various Division III and ACHA college programs.
