= North American 3 Eastern Hockey League =

American hockey league

- Sport: Ice hockey
- Founded: 2012
- Folded: 2016
- No. of teams: 13
- Country: United States
- Last champion: Jersey Shore Wildcats
- Most titles: Jersey Shore Wildcats (3)
- Website: na3ehl.com

North American 3 Eastern Hockey League (NA3EHL) was a USA Hockey-sanctioned Tier III junior ice hockey league. The league had teams in the New England and Mid-Atlantic regions of the United States. In 2016, the league merged with the North American 3 Hockey League.

== History ==
Precursors to the league were:

- Interstate Junior Hockey League (1998–2004)
- International Junior Hockey League (2005–2012)

=== Northern States Hockey League (2012–2014) ===
The Northern States Hockey League (NSHL) formed in spring 2012 and became the second league to be sanctioned by the Amateur Athletic Union (AAU) and its United Hockey Union program. Several existing programs from the defunct International Junior Hockey League (IJHL) Super Elite Division joined new franchises to form a seven-team league. The initial teams included the Cape Cod Islanders, the Eastern Kodiaks, the Junior Mariners, the Lake George Fighting Spirit, the New England Stars, the Syracuse Stampede, and the Trenton Habs.

For the 2013–14 season the league added the Maine Moose, the Maine Wild, and the Wilkes-Barre Miners. In addition, two teams relocated and changed names when the Lake George Fighting Spirit moved to Waterville Valley, New Hampshire and became known as American Hockey Institute Fighting Spirit and the Trenton Habs were renamed the Jersey Shore Wildcats when they moved their operations to Wall Township, New Jersey. The league also lost the Eastern Kodiaks when the team moved operations to Jamestown, New York, shortly before folding.

The NSHL continued growth for the 2014–15 season when the league announced three new teams: the Roc City Royals, Central New York Stallions, and the Lockport Express. Two franchises also announced relocation and name change plans. The Maine Moose franchise was sold and renamed the Maine Timberwolves with a relocation to Lewiston, Maine, and the AHI Fighting Spirit was renamed the New Hampshire Fighting Spirit with a relocation to Laconia, New Hampshire. The league also organized the 12 teams into two divisions of six teams each. However, when the NSHL released its 2014–15 schedule in August, the CNY Stallions were not included in the schedule, reducing the west division to five teams and the league to eleven teams. On September 17, the Maine Timberwolves folded prior to the start of the season re-balancing the league to five teams per division.

=== North American 3 Eastern Hockey League (2014–2016) ===
In October 2014, the NSHL left the United Hockey Union after two seasons under the promise of USA Hockey sanctioning by affiliating with the Tier II Junior A North American Hockey League (NAHL) early into the 2014–15 season. Under the new organizational management by the NAHL, the league changed its name to the North American 3 Eastern Hockey League. Because the season had already started, the league would operate independently for the 2014–15 season and would apply to join USA Hockey before the 2015–16 season. The NA3EHL was approved for Tier III status by USA Hockey in May 2015. After the league was renamed, the Junior Mariners changed their name to the East Coast Minutemen while continuing to play out of Salem, New Hampshire. On December 16, 2014, it was announced that the Fighting Spirit would relocate once again for the following season to Lewiston, Maine and renamed as the L/A (Lewiston/Auburn) Fighting Spirit.

On November 18, 2014, the NAHL announced it was adding the Skylands Kings junior hockey team for expansion to the NA3EHL beginning play in the 2015–16 season. On April 9, 2015, the NA3EHL announced the addition of the Northeast Generals as an expansion team to begin play the following season based out of Canton, Massachusetts. On April 13, 2015, it was announced the New York Aviators, the 2015 United States Premier Hockey League-Empire Division Champions, would be transferring to the NA3EHL starting in the 2015–16 season.

On March 4, 2016, it was formally announced that the NA3EHL would be added to the North American Hockey League's other Tier III league, the North American 3 Hockey League (NA3HL), beginning with the 2016–17 season. The former NA3EHL teams became two new divisions within the NA3HL: the Coastal and Northeast.

== List of all teams ==
- AHI Fighting Spirit (2013–14; Waterville Valley, New Hampshire; relocated to Laconia, New Hampshire, in 2014)
- Cape Cod Islanders (2012–16; Falmouth, Massachusetts; joined the NA3HL in 2016)
- CNY Stallions (announced for 2014–15 but did not participate)
- East Coast Minutemen (2014–16; Salem, New Hampshire; joined the NA3HL in 2016)
- Eastern Kodiaks (2012–13; Exeter, New Hampshire; folded after one season in the NSHL)
- Jersey Shore Wildcats (2013–16; Wall Township, New Jersey; joined the NA3HL in 2016)
- Junior Mariners (2012–14; Salem, New Hampshire; renamed to East Coast Minutemen during the 2014–15 season)
- L/A Fighting Spirit (2015–16; Lewiston-Auburn, Maine; joined the NA3HL in 2016)
- Lake George Fighting Spirit (2012–13; Lake George, New York; relocated to Waterville Valley, New Hampshire, in 2013)
- Lockport Express (2014–16; Lockport, New York; joined the NA3HL in 2016)
- Maine Moose (2012–13 as a partial NSHL member, 2013–14 as a full member; Hallowell, Maine; sold and renamed to Maine Timberwolves in 2014)
- Maine Timberwolves (folded prior to the 2014–15 season without ever playing a game; intended to play out of Lewiston, Maine)
- Maine Wild (2013–16; Biddeford, Maine; joined the NA3HL in 2016)
- New England Stars (2012–16; Tyngsboro, Massachusetts; joined the NA3HL in 2016)
- New Hampshire Fighting Spirit (2014–15; Laconia, New Hampshire; relocated to Lewiston-Auburn, Maine, as the L/A Fighting Spirit in 2015)
- New York Aviators (2015–16; Brooklyn, New York; joined the NA3HL in 2016, relocated to Long Beach, New York, and became the Long Beach Sharks)
- Northeast Generals (2015–16; Canton, Massachusetts; joined the NA3HL in 2016 as well as creating a Tier II team in the NAHL)
- Roc City Royals (2014–16; Rochester, New York; joined the NA3HL in 2016)
- Skylands Kings (2015–16; Stockholm, New Jersey; joined the NA3HL in 2016)
- Syracuse Stampede (2012–16; Baldwinsville, New York; joined the NA3HL in 2016)
- Trenton Habs (2012–13; Trenton, New Jersey; relocated to Wall Township, New Jersey, and became the Jersey Shore Wildcats in 2013)
- Wilkes-Barre Miners (2013–16; Wilkes-Barre, Pennsylvania; joined the NA3HL in 2016, relocated to Binghamton, New York, and became the Binghamton Jr. Senators)

== Season summary ==
NA3EHL/NSHL Cup Champions

- 2012–13: Syracuse Stampede
- 2013–14: Jersey Shore Wildcats
- 2014–15: Jersey Shore Wildcats
- 2015–16: Jersey Shore Wildcats

NA3EHL/NSHL Regular Season Champions

- 2012–13: Lake George Fighting Spirit
- 2013–14: AHI Fighting Spirit
- 2014–15: Jersey Shore Wildcats
- 2015–16: Jersey Shore Wildcats

== See also ==
- List of ice hockey leagues
