= Hallowell, Maine =

City in Maine, United States

- City
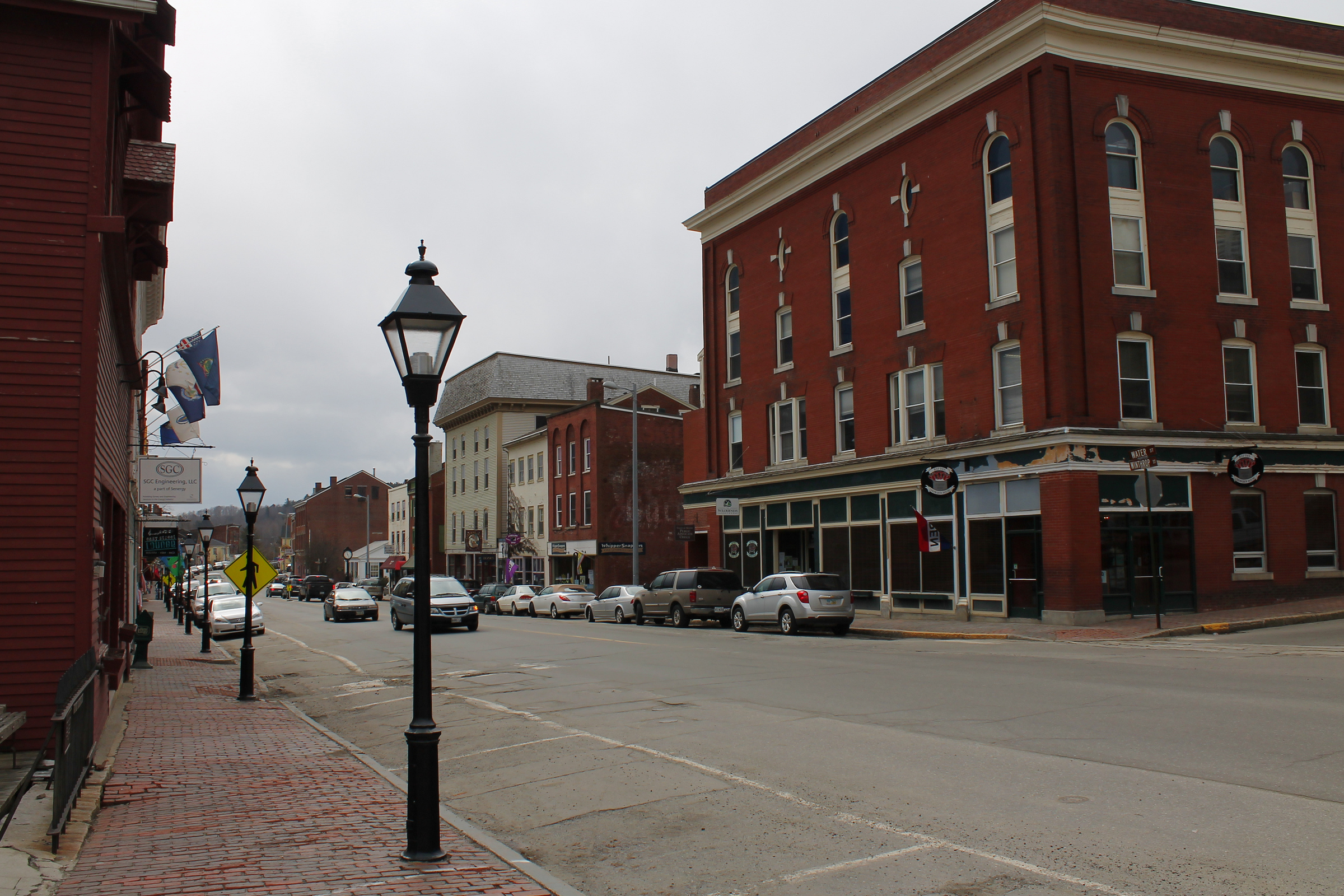
- A view of Water Street (US 201) in the city's historic heart.

- Seal

- Location in Kennebec County and the state of Maine
- Coordinates: 44°17′26″N 69°48′51″W
- Country: United States
- State: Maine
- County: Kennebec
- Incorporated: 1771
- Village: Granite Hill

Area
  - Total: 6.08 sq mi (15.76 km^{2})
  - Land: 5.86 sq mi (15.19 km^{2})
  - Water: 0.22 sq mi (0.57 km^{2})
- Elevation: 243 ft (74 m)

Population (2020)
  - Total: 2,570
  - Density: 438.3/sq mi (169.22/km^{2})
- Time zone: UTC−5 (Eastern (EST))
  - Summer (DST): UTC−4 (EDT)
- ZIP code: 04347
- Area code: 207
- FIPS code: 23-30550
- GNIS feature ID: 582505
- Website: www.hallowell.govoffice.com

Hallowell (/ˈhɔːləwɛl/ HAW-lə-wel) is a city in Kennebec County, Maine, United States. The population was 2,570 at the 2020 census. Popular with tourists, Hallowell is noted for its culture and old architecture. Hallowell is included in the Augusta, Maine, micropolitan New England City and Town Area.

== History ==
The city is named for Benjamin Hallowell, a Boston merchant and one of the Kennebec Proprietors, holders of land originally granted to the Plymouth Company by the British monarchy in the 1620s.

The first settler of European descent was Deacon Pease Clark, who emigrated with his wife and son Peter from Attleborough, Massachusetts, in the spring of 1762. Legend has it that after disembarking on the west side of the Kennebec, near present-day Water Street, the Clarks took shelter in their overturned cart. On a riverfront lot measuring 50 rods (275 yards, about 250 meters), the Clark family raised corn, rye and other crops. The first land they cleared was occupied by the fire department in 1859.

In 1797, Harrington (later the city of Augusta) split from Hallowell to be a separate town. The part of Hallowell that is the current city was then known as "The Hook". Today, the city's population (2,467) is only slightly smaller than it was in 1820, the year Maine was separated from Massachusetts and became a state. Around 1830, Hallowell's inhabitants enjoyed the services of 71 stores along Water Street (a greater number than Augusta, which had a population of 1,000 and just 20 merchants).

Thriving industries included logging, trading, publishing and shipbuilding. Location on the navigable Kennebec River estuary allowed 50 ships launched from Hallowell's wharves to reach the Atlantic Ocean between 1783 and 1901. Two grist mills, five sawmills and two slaughterhouses served the needs of residents near and far.

In 1815, the first granite quarried near the Manchester town line signaled the birth of an industry that would support Hallowell until 1908, when cement displaced stone as the construction material of choice. In 1826, the ice industry began in earnest, employing thousands over the next 75 years. Frozen blocks loaded onto Hallowell's schooners were delivered to Cuba and the West Indies. Other local products exported via the Kennebec (and, after 1857, by train) from Hallowell included sandpaper, textiles from cotton from the Deep South, rope, linseed oil, oilcloth, wire, books and shoes.

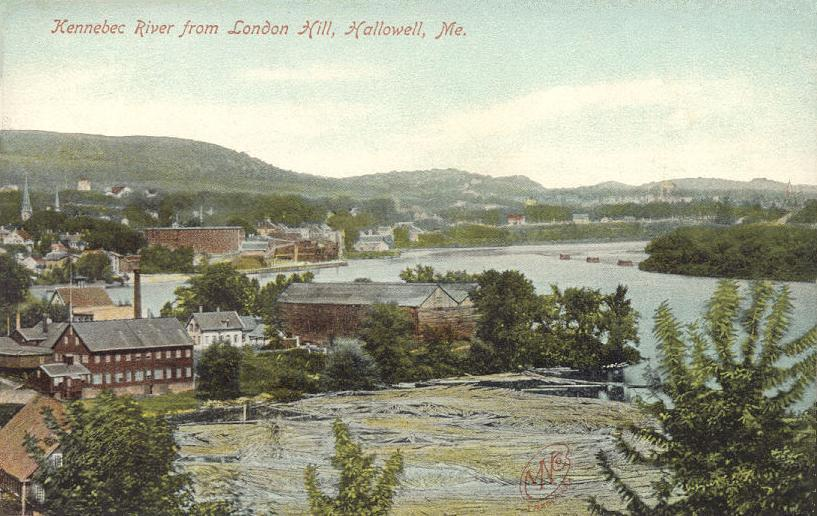
Hallowell c. 1905

The Kennebec River sustained the city from its inception, but the waterway also inspired fear. Spring floods regularly terrorized shopkeepers and sometimes brought commerce to a standstill. Worse still, citizens eager to cross the river in winter and unwary children skating and playing too far from the riverbank lost their lives when ice turned out to be thinner than it looked. During 1816, the Year Without a Summer, numerous crops were damaged and/or destroyed throughout New England, including in Hallowell. Farmers were often forced to slaughter some of their livestock for food and, later, to sell remaining crops at nearly double normal prices.

In 1875, the state opened the Maine Industrial School for Girls in Hallowell. Operated until the 1970s, it was the state's first reform school for girls.

== Geography ==
According to the United States Census Bureau, the city has a total area of 6.09 square miles (15.77 km^{2}), of which 5.88 square miles (15.23 km^{2}) is land and 0.21 square miles (0.54 km^{2}) is water. Drained by Vaughn Brook, Hallowell is bounded by the Kennebec River.

The city is crossed by Interstate 95, as well as state routes 27 and 201. It borders the towns of Farmingdale to the south, Manchester to the west, Augusta to the north, and Chelsea across the Kennebec River to the east.

=== Climate ===
This climatic region is typified by large seasonal temperature differences, with warm to hot (and often humid) summers and cold (sometimes severely cold) winters. According to the Köppen Climate Classification system, Hallowell has a humid continental climate, abbreviated "Dfb" on climate maps.

== Culture ==
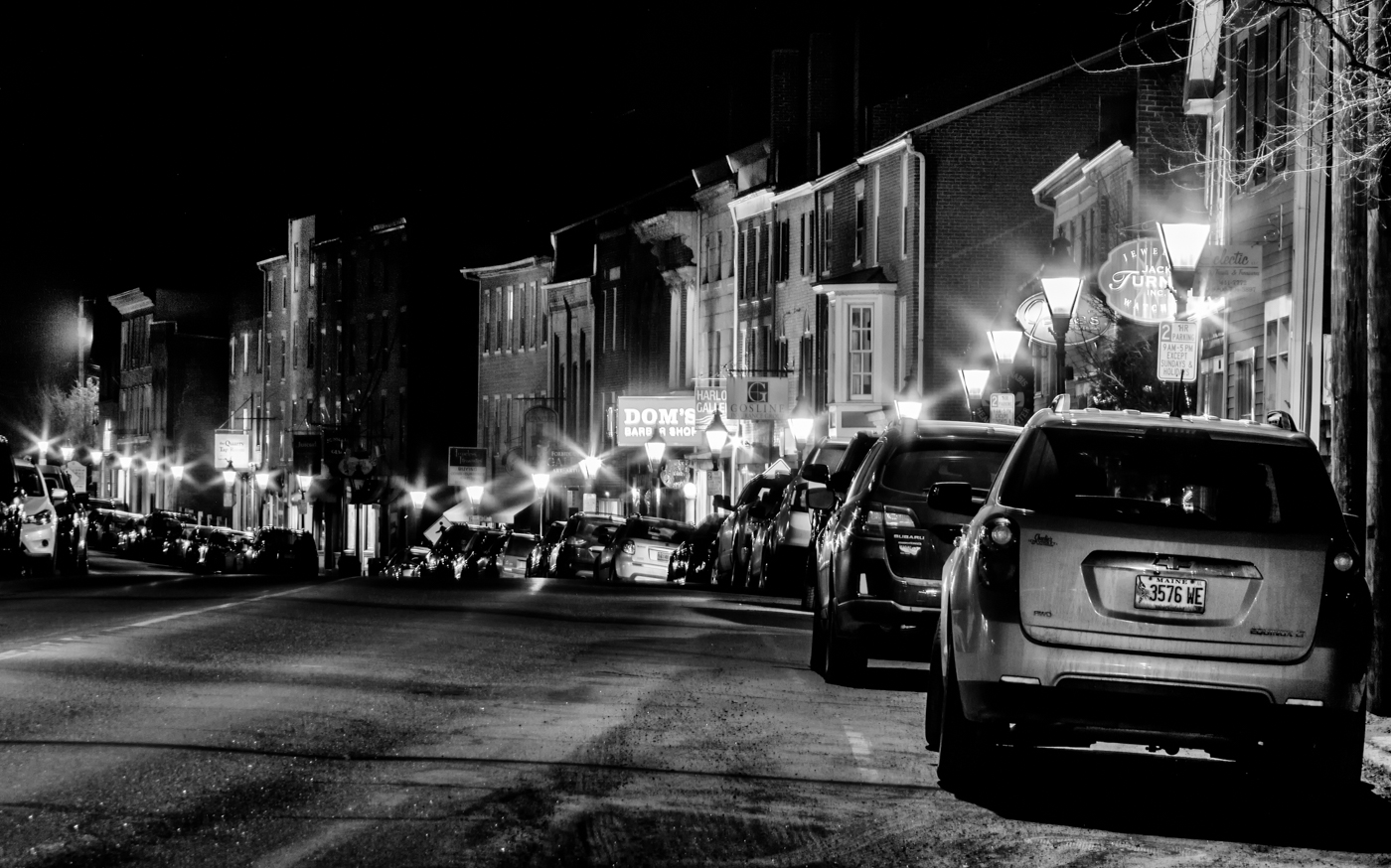
Water Street at night

Hallowell is nicknamed "The Little Easy," or "New Orleans on the Kennebec." The city is also known as "Maine's Antique Riverport."

Since 1968, the community has hosted Old Hallowell Day, an annual celebration hosted on the third weekend of July, that includes a parade, fireworks, and live performances.

The city is the home of Gaslight Theater, one of Maine's oldest community theater companies.

Hallowell has been a regional center for the arts for many years in central Maine, with renowned art galleries, performing arts theaters, studios, festivals, and local artists. Hallowell is also home to renowned bars, taverns and restaurants, with the downtown area having a high concentration of eating and drinking establishments.

The Hallowell Farmers' Market takes place every Saturday from 9:00 am until 12:00 pm at Stevens Commons.

== Demographics ==
Historical population
Census	Pop.	Note	%±
1790	1,194		—
1800	1,364		14.2%
1810	2,068		51.6%
1820	2,919		41.2%
1830	3,961		35.7%
1840	4,654		17.5%
1850	4,769		2.5%
1860	2,435		−48.9%
1870	3,007		23.5%
1880	3,154		4.9%
1890	3,181		0.9%
1900	2,714		−14.7%
1910	2,864		5.5%
1920	2,764		−3.5%
1930	2,675		−3.2%
1940	2,906		8.6%
1950	3,404		17.1%
1960	3,169		−6.9%
1970	2,814		−11.2%
1980	2,502		−11.1%
1990	2,534		1.3%
2000	2,467		−2.6%
2010	2,381		−3.5%
2020	2,570		7.9%
U.S. Decennial Census

=== 2020 census ===
As of the 2020 census, Hallowell had a population of 2,570. The median age was 51.2 years. 13.9% of residents were under the age of 18 and 29.9% of residents were 65 years of age or older. For every 100 females there were 84.1 males, and for every 100 females age 18 and over there were 79.0 males age 18 and over.

80.2% of residents lived in urban areas, while 19.8% lived in rural areas.

There were 1,281 households in Hallowell, of which 17.3% had children under the age of 18 living in them. Of all households, 35.3% were married-couple households, 21.1% were households with a male householder and no spouse or partner present, and 36.1% were households with a female householder and no spouse or partner present. About 45.4% of all households were made up of individuals and 24.0% had someone living alone who was 65 years of age or older.

There were 1,433 housing units, of which 10.6% were vacant. The homeowner vacancy rate was 1.1% and the rental vacancy rate was 5.8%.

Racial composition as of the 2020 census
Race	Number	Percent
White	2,375	92.4%
Black or African American	13	0.5%
American Indian and Alaska Native	8	0.3%
Asian	34	1.3%
Native Hawaiian and Other Pacific Islander	0	0.0%
Some other race	22	0.9%
Two or more races	118	4.6%
Hispanic or Latino (of any race)	45	1.8%

=== 2010 census ===
As of the census of 2010, there were 2,381 people, 1,193 households, and 556 families living in the city. The population density was 404.9 inhabitants per square mile (156.3/km^{2}). There were 1,329 housing units at an average density of 226.0 per square mile (87.3/km^{2}). The racial makeup of the city was 95.5% White, 0.7% African American, 0.5% Native American, 1.5% Asian, 0.1% from other races, and 1.7% from two or more races. Hispanic or Latino of any race were 1.1% of the population.

There were 1,193 households, of which 17.5% had children under the age of 18 living with them, 36.3% were married couples living together, 6.9% had a female householder with no husband present, 3.4% had a male householder with no wife present, and 53.4% were non-families. 45.8% of all households were made up of individuals, and 20.2% had someone living alone who was 65 years of age or older. The average household size was 1.89 and the average family size was 2.63.

The median age in the city was 50.5 years. 14% of residents were under the age of 18; 5.8% were between the ages of 18 and 24; 22.3% were from 25 to 44; 33.4% were from 45 to 64; and 24.5% were 65 years of age or older. The gender makeup of the city was 46.3% male and 53.7% female.

=== 2000 census ===
As of the census of 2000, there were 2,467 people, 1,145 households, and 604 families living in the city. The population density was 420.1 inhabitants per square mile (162.2/km^{2}). There were 1,243 housing units at an average density of 211.7 per square mile (81.7/km^{2}). The racial makeup of the city was 97.20% White, 0.41% African American, 0.32% Native American, 0.89% Asian, 0.04% Pacific Islander, and 1.13% from two or more races. Hispanic or Latino of any race were 1.13% of the population.

There were 1,145 households, out of which 25.2% had children under the age of 18 living with them, 40.7% were married couples living together, 8.6% had a female householder with no husband present, and 47.2% were non-families. 41.5% of all households were made up of individuals, and 12.8% had someone living alone who was 65 years of age or older. The average household size was 2.06 and the average family size was 2.80.

In the city, the population was spread out, with 21.0% under the age of 18, 6.5% from 18 to 24, 28.1% from 25 to 44, 29.1% from 45 to 64, and 15.4% who were 65 years of age or older. The median age was 42 years. For every 100 females, there were 91.4 males. For every 100 females age 18 and over, there were 89.3 males.

The median income for a household in the city was $59,500, and the median income for a family was $73,510. Males had a median income of $47,381 versus $25,139 for females. The per capita income for the city was $41,687. About 5.4% of families and 6.0% of the population were below the poverty line, including 15.6% of those under age 18 and 2.0% of those age 65 or over.

== Government ==
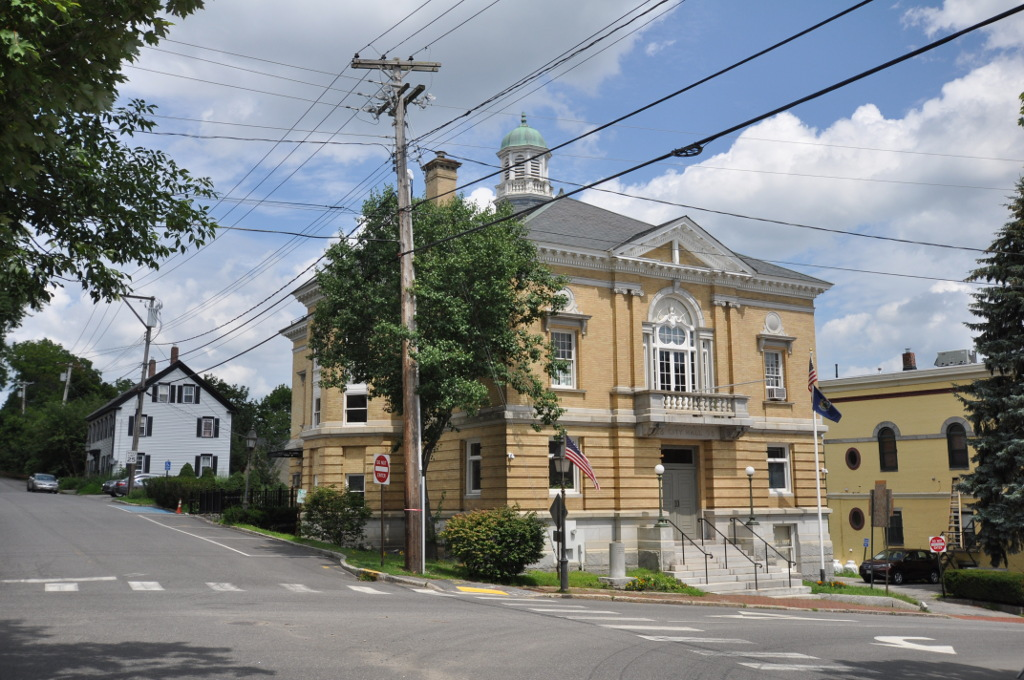
Hallowell City Hall

=== Local government ===
The City of Hallowell has a mayor and council-manager form of government. The voters of Hallowell elect councilors and a mayor who represent them through the government process.

The mayor appoints and the council ratifies a city manager to be the administrative head of the city. The position of mayor is largely ceremonial. The city manager oversees the daily operations of the city government, prepares annual budgets, and directs all city agencies and departments.

=== Political makeup ===
Hallowell is a well known left-leaning city and has the seventh highest percent of Democratic voters of all municipalities in Maine with a population over 1,000. The city voted for Barack Obama by more than a 2-to-1 margin in the 2008 presidential Election, and the 2012 presidential Election. In 2012 the city voted on a statewide referendum to allow same-sex marriage in Maine by a vote of 69% to 31%.

Voter registration

Voter Registration and Party Enrollment as of September 2015
Party	Total Voters	Percentage
Democratic	913	45.67%
Unenrolled	558	27.91%
Republican	468	23.41%
Green Independent	60	3.00%
Total	1,999	100%

== Education ==
Hallowell, along with Farmingdale, is served by the Hall-Dale School System, which is part of the Kennebec Intra-District Schools (KIDS) Regional School Unit 2, which joins the towns of Dresden, Farmingdale, Hallowell, and Monmouth.

The district operates three schools:

- Hall-Dale Elementary School (Pre-K–5) 389 students, Hallowell
- Hall-Dale Middle School (6–8) 201 students, Farmingdale
- Hall-Dale High School (9–12) 349 students, Farmingdale

== Architecture ==
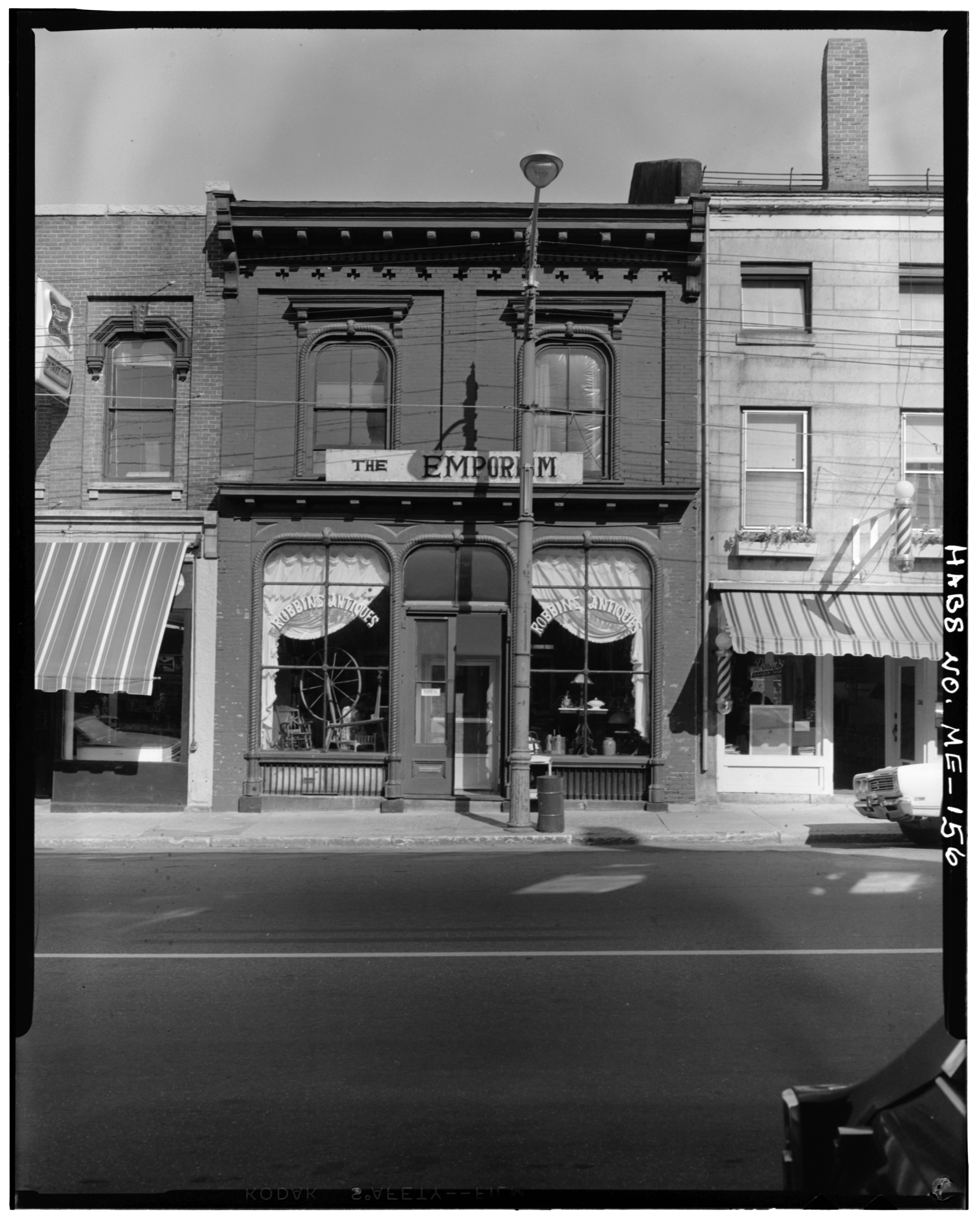
The Emporium, pictured in 1971

The former Emporium, at today's 154 Water Street, was built in the early 19th century. Its significance of having a cast-iron facade installed circa 1870, modifying it to its present Victorian appearance, is demonstrated by its listing in the Historic American Buildings Survey.

== Site of interest ==
- Elm Hill Farm
- Gaslight Theater
- Hallowell Area Board of Trade
- Historic Hallowell Committee
- Harlow Gallery, home of the Kennebec Valley Art Association (founded in 1963)
- Hubbard Free Library
- Kennebec Ice Arena
- Kennebec Lodge No. 5 A.F. & A.M., Masonic lodge chartered in Hallowell by Paul Revere in 1796
- Powder House Lot
- Row House
- St. Matthew's Episcopal Church
- Vaughan Homestead

== In popular culture ==
The town is the heart of the action in Ariel Lawhon's historical novel The Frozen River.

== See also ==
- Hallowell Historic District
