= International Junior Hockey League =

- Sport: Ice hockey
- Founded: 2005
- Folded: 2012
- CEO: Charlie Nielsen
- No. of teams: 24 in 3 leagues
- Country: United States
- Website: ijhl.us

International Junior Hockey League was an independent Junior A ice hockey league. The League had teams in New England and Mid Atlantic United States.

== League History ==
The league formed in 2005 out of the Interstate Junior Hockey League with teams based in the Northeastern United States and expanded over the next few seasons. Charlie Nielsen is the commissioner of the league.

In December 2011, the Northern New York Gamblers of Massena, New York opted to leave the IJHL.

In July 2012, the ijhl folded after the "Super Elite" league went under. Most of the "Super Elite" league members decided to create a new league called the Northern States Junior Hockey League (NSHL) so they could resume play in the fall.

== Teams ==
As of September 2012 the IJHL lists the following members. The Super Elite League is the IJHL's Jr A league, the Elite league is on par with Jr B.

=== Elite League ===
Team	Location
Junior Shamrocks	Marlboro, Massachusetts
Kodiaks Black	Exeter, New Hampshire
Kodiaks Green	Exeter, New Hampshire
Maine Moose Elite	Hallowell, Maine
Mass Junior Lightning	Unknown
Mass Maple Leafs U-16	Raynham, Massachusetts
Mass Maple Leafs U-18	Raynham, Massachusetts
New Jersey Raiders	Farmingdale, New Jersey
Worcester Junior Wildcats	Worcester, Massachusetts

== See also ==
- List of ice hockey leagues

== External links and References ==
- IJHL.com Official Website
