= Wisconsin Woodsmen =

- City: Tomah, Wisconsin
- League: North American 3 Hockey League
- Division: Central
- Founded: 2011
- Home arena: Tomah Ice Center
- Colors: Red, light blue, black, silver
- Owners: Adam Keer; Ryan Egan
- General manager: Adam Keer
- Head coach: Jon Vaillancourt

Franchise history
- 2011–2016: Twin City Steel
- 2016–2023: New Ulm Steel
- 2023–present: Wisconsin Woodsmen

The Wisconsin Woodsmen are a Tier III junior ice hockey team based in Tomah, Wisconsin. They are members of the Central Division of the North American 3 Hockey League (NA3HL).

== History ==
Founded in 2011 when the North American 3 Hockey League (NA3HL) announced its expansion from 12 teams to 16. The Twin City Steel were to be based in the new White Bear Lake Sports Center in White Bear Lake, Minnesota, starting for the 2011–12 season alongside the other three other new NA3HL teams: the Minnesota Junior Hockey League transfers, Granite City Lumberjacks and Minnesota Flying Aces, and an expansion team, the North Iowa Bulls. The Twin City Steel played their first season out of the new Vadnais Sports Center, situated in the Twin Cities, which includes the suburbs of White Bear Lake, North St. Paul, Forest Lake, Roseville and Moundsview. The Twin City Steel lost their first game, 4–3, at the Granite City Lumberjacks on September 10, 2011, and would record their first win less than a week later at their home-opener.

It was announced on April 23, 2013, that the Steel have been sold by Scott Wallin to the Black family.

After a successful 30–13–4 record during the 2015–16 regular season, the Steel would go on to win their first West Division Championship by sweeping the defending league champions, Granite City Lumberjacks. The Steel then made their first NA3HL Silver Cup Playoff appearance but would lose in overtime to the eventual Silver Cup Champion North Iowa Bulls.

New Ulm Steel logo.

On April 26, 2016, it was announced that the Twin City Steel would be relocating to New Ulm, Minnesota, to become the New Ulm Steel. In 2018, Steve Black also purchased a team in the Tier II North American Hockey League (NAHL) and relocated it as the Chippewa Steel. In March 2021, Steve Black sold both Steel teams to an ownership group led by Kelly Kasik.

In April 2023, the Pinnacle Hockey Group, LLC, consisting of owners Adam Keer and Ryan Egan, purchased and relocated the New Ulm Steel to Tomah, Wisconsin, as the Wisconsin Woodsmen.

== Season-by-season records ==
Season	GP	W	L	OTL	SOL	Pts	GF	GA	PIM	Regular season finish	Playoffs
Twin Cities Steel
2011–12	48	24	21	2	1	51	173	173	1507	3rd of 4, West; 9th of 19, NA3HL	Lost Div. Semifinals, 0–2 vs. North Iowa Bulls
2012–13	48	19	26	1	2	41	167	226	1210	5th of 6, West; 12th of 17, NA3HL	Did not qualify
2013–14	48	22	20	6	—	50	186	201	1000	4th of 6, West; 13th of 21, NA3HL	Lost Div. Semifinals, 0–2 vs. North Iowa Bulls
2014–15	47	23	22	2	—	48	161	170	1364	4th of 6, West; 20th of 31, NA3HL	Lost Div. Semifinals, 0–2 vs. North Iowa Bulls
2015–16	47	30	13	4	—	64	219	160	660	2nd of 5, West; 15th of 34, NA3HL	Won Div. Semifinals, 2–1 vs. Breezy Point North Stars; Won Div. Finals, 2–0 vs. Granite City Lumberjacks; 1–2–0 in Silver Cup Round Robin (L, 3–4 vs. Jr. Blues; L, 1–2 vs. Jets; W, 5–2 vs. Jr. Brahmas); Lost Semifinal game, 3–4 OT vs. North Iowa Bulls
New Ulm Steel
2016–17	47	26	18	0	3	55	183	163	765	3rd of 5, West; 19th of 48, NA3HL	Won Div. Semifinals, 2–1 vs. Alexandria Blizzard; Lost Div. Finals, 1–2 vs. Granite City Lumberjacks
2017–18	47	30	11	4	2	66	204	133	469	2nd of 5, West; 13th of 42, NA3HL	Won Div. Semifinals, 2–1 vs. Alexandria Blizzard; Lost Div. Finals, 0–2 vs. Granite City Lumberjacks
2018–19	47	25	18	1	3	54	192	178	771	5th of 7, West; 20th of 36, NA3HL	Did not qualify
2019–20	47	31	13	2	1	65	195	136	690	3rd of 6, West; 11th of 34, NA3HL	Playoffs cancelled
2020–21	40	7	29	4	0	18	86	185	513	5th of 5, West; 29th of 31, NA3HL	Did not qualify
2021–22	47	10	36	1	0	21	98	245	737	5th of 6, West; 29th of 34, NA3HL	Did not qualify
2022–23	47	15	26	1	5	36	145	205	991	5th of 6, West; 26th of 34, NA3HL	Did not qualify
Wisconsin Woodsmen
2023-24	42	22	17	1	2	47	150	118	588	4th of 6, Central; 18 of 34, NA3HL	Lost Div Semifinal 0-2 (Wausau Cyclones)
2024-25	47	24	16	4	3	55	200	176	588	4th of 6, Central; 16 of 35, NA3HL	Lost Div Semifinal 0-2 (Rochester Grizzlies)
2025-26	47	19	24	2	2	42	166	194	x	5th of 6, Central; 27 of 38, NA3HL	Did not qualify
