= Kivlenieks =

Kivlenieks (feminine: Kivleniece) is a Latvian toponymic surname. Individuals with the surname include:

- Inārs Kivlenieks (born 1986), Latvian luger
- Matīss Kivlenieks (1996–2021), Latvian ice hockey goaltender
