= Willmar WarHawks =

- City: Willmar, Minnesota
- League: NA3HL
- Division: West
- Founded: 2007
- Home arena: Willmar Civic Center
- Colors: Red, black, gray, and white
- Owners: Blizzard Hockey, LLC.
- General manager: Payton Ruter
- Head coach: Payton Ruter

Franchise history
- 2007–2016: Minnesota Flying Aces
- 2016–present: Willmar WarHawks

The Willmar WarHawks are a Tier III junior ice hockey team playing in the North American 3 Hockey League (NA3HL). The team plays their home games at the Willmar Civic Center located in Willmar, Minnesota.

NA3HL teams play a 47-game regular season schedule, and additional post-season games (if qualifying for playoffs). The Warhawks compete in the West Division of the NA3HL along with the Alexandria Blizzard, Granite City Lumberjacks, Mason City Toros, Minnesota Moose, and Minnesota Wilderness.

== History ==
Flying Aces' logo

Established as the Minnesota Flying Aces, the franchise's first season was in 2007–08 as members of the Minnesota Junior Hockey League (MnJHL). The Flying Aces were based out Little Falls, Minnesota, and played their home games at Exchange Arena.

Following the 2010–11 season, the franchise moved to the North American 3 Hockey League along with in-state rival, the Granite City Lumberjacks.

On May 24, 2016, Flying Aces owners John and Debbie Holthaus sold the franchise to Blizzard Hockey, LLC. Blizzard Hockey also owns the North American Hockey League's St. Cloud Norsemen and the NA3HL's Alexandria Blizzard. The new owners then relocated the franchise to Willmar, Minnesota. It was at this time the team was renamed the Willmar WarHawks.

== Season-by-Season Team Records ==
Regular season records, as of conclusion of 2025-26 season

Season	Team Name	League	GP	W	L	OTL	SOL	Pts	GF	GA	Regular season Finish	Playoffs
2007–08	Minnesota Flying Aces	MnJHL	48	14	31	1	2	31	160	214	7th of 9, MnJHL	Won 1st Round, 2–0 vs Wisconsin Mustangs; Lost 2nd Round, 1–2 vs Rochester Ice Hawks
2008–09	Minnesota Flying Aces	MnJHL	48	16	30	0	2	34	153	252	6th of 9, MnJHL	Lost 1st Rd 0–2 vs Rochester Ice Hawks
2009–10	Minnesota Flying Aces	MnJHL	50	15	32	0	3	33	181	251	6th of 9, MnJHL	Lost 1st Rd 0–2 vs Rochester Ice Hawks
2010–11	Minnesota Flying Aces	MnJHL	45	26	15	0	4	56	180	164	3rd of 8, MnJHL	Lost 1st Round, 1–2 vs Hudson Crusaders
2011–12	Minnesota Flying Aces	NA3HL	48	21	24	2	1	45	176	201	4th of 4, West Div. 12th of 16, NA3HL	Lost Div. Semifinals, 0–2 vs Granite City Lumberjacks
2012–13	Minnesota Flying Aces	NA3HL	48	20	26	1	1	42	137	175	4th of 6, West Div. 11th of 17, NA3HL	Lost Div. Semifinals, 0–3 vs North Iowa Bulls
2013–14	Minnesota Flying Aces	NA3HL	48	9	36	3	—	21	111	275	5th of 6, West Div. 19th of 21, NA3HL	Did not qualify
2014–15	Minnesota Flying Aces	NA3HL	47	7	37	3	—	17	109	273	6th of 6, West Div. 30th of 31, NA3HL	Did not qualify
2015–16	Minnesota Flying Aces	NA3HL	47	11	34	2	—	24	124	248	5th of 5, West Div. 26th of 34, NA3HL	Did not qualify
2016–17	Willmar Warhawks	NA3HL	47	22	22	2	1	47	148	175	5th of 5, West Div. 30th of 48, NA3HL	Did not qualify
2017–18	Willmar Warhawks	NA3HL	47	22	21	4	0	48	159	182	4th of 5, West Div. 23rd of 42, NA3HL	Lost Div. Semifinals, 0–2 vs. Granite City Lumberjacks
2018–19	Willmar Warhawks	NA3HL	47	12	33	2	0	26	110	217	7th of 7, West Div. 29th of 36, NA3HL	Did not qualify
2019–20	Willmar Warhawks	NA3HL	47	18	24	3	2	41	146	210	5th of 6, West Div. 23rd of 34, NA3HL	Did not qualify
2020–21	Willmar Warhawks	NA3HL	40	22	18	0	0	44	147	138	3rd of 5, West Div. 16th of 31, NA3HL	Won Div. Semifinals, 2–0 vs. Granite City Lumberjacks; Lost Div. Finals, 1–2 vs. North Iowa Bulls
2021–22	Willmar Warhawks	NA3HL	47	32	14	0	1	65	219	121	3rd of 6, West Div. 11th of 34, NA3HL	Lost Div. Semifinals, 0-2 vs. Mason City Toros
2022–23	Willmar Warhawks	NA3HL	47	20	25	0	2	42	155	207	4th of 6, West Div. 24th of 34, NA3HL	Lost Div. Semifinals, 0-2 vs. Granite City Lumberjacks
2023–24	Willmar Warhawks	NA3HL	47	16	28	2	1	35	160	189	5th of 6, West Div. 25th of 34, NA3HL	Did not qualify
2024–25	Willmar Warhawks	NA3HL	47	22	24	1	0	41	130	167	4th of 6, West Div. 21st of 35, NA3HL	Lost Div. Semifinals, 0-2 vs. Granite City Lumberjacks
2025-26	Willmar Warhawks	NA3HL	47	19	26	2	0	40	166	188	5th of 6, West Div. 28th of 38, NA3HL	Did not qualify

== Coaching History ==
=== As of 3/11/26 ===
Tenure	Head coach	Years	Record	Pct.
2016-17	Chris Blasius †	1+	31–30–1–0	.508
2017-18	Steve Yurichuk	1	6-4-1-0	.591
2017-18	Mike Bowman ††	1	7-11-2-0	.400
2018-19	Saverio Posa	1	12-33-2-0	.277
2019–22	Kirk Olimb	3	72–60–0–2	.545
2022–23	Connor White & Kyle Christensen †††	1	20–25–2–0	.447
2023–present	Payton Ruter	3	57-78-5-1	.426

† Chris Blasius stepped was the head coach for the 2016-17 season, and for the first portion of 2017-18 through 11/17/17.

†† Mike Bowman was hired as fulltime head coach on 12/24/17 to replace interim head coach Steve Yurichuk .

††† Connor White was hired as head coach for 2022-23 season. Kyle Christensen took over as head coach for a portion of the 2022-23 season, before being replaced by Connor White for the remainder of the season. Transition dates have not been able to be verified so both coaches are co-listed for the 2022-23 season.

== Statistical leaders ==
=== Willmar Warhawks Statistical Leaders ===
The Willmar Warhawks statistical leaders consider all historical statistics commencing with the franchise's move to Willmar, MN, prior to the 2016-17 NA3HL season (2016-present).

==== Willmar Warhawks Career Points Leaders ====
Brandan Holt (Madison Heights, MI) set the Willmar Warhawks career points record during the 2019-20 season with 114 career points.

===== NA3HL Regular + Post-Season Combined - Updated Following 2025-26 Season =====
Rank	Player	Years	GP	G	A	Pts
1	Brandan Holt	2017-20	119	40	74	114
2	Michael Sweetland	2020-23	107	44	69	113
3	Tyler Misialek	2021-24	131	59	38	97
4	Eli Slagter	2017-20	133	37	52	89
5	Aidan Callaghan	2024-26	74	34	50	84
6	Mason Wanka	2024-26	55	33	39	72
7	Jeremiah Konkel	2020-22	85	31	39	70
8	Gabe Adams	2024-26	94	42	24	66
t9	Braden Shea	2016-18	78	27	38	65
t9	Braydon Buckingham	2022-24	83	26	39	65

==== Willmar Warhawks Career Goal Leaders ====
Tyler Misialek (West Fargo, ND) set the Willmar Warhawks career goals record during the 2023-24 season with 59 career goals.

===== NA3HL Regular + Post-Season Combined - Updated Following 2025-26 Season =====
Rank	Player	Years	GP	G	A	Pts
1	Tyler Misialek	2021-24	131	59	38	97
2	Michael Sweetland	2020-23	107	44	69	113
3	Gabe Adams	2024-26	94	42	24	66
4	Brandan Holt	2017-20	119	40	74	114
5	Eli Slagter	2017-20	133	37	52	89
6	Aidan Callaghan	2024-26	74	34	50	84
7	Mason Wanka	2024-26	55	33	39	72
8	Jeremiah Konkel	2020-22	85	31	39	70
9	Braden Shea	2016-18	78	27	38	65
t10	Max Oelkers	2016-18	95	26	37	63
t10	Jordan Cooper	2016-18	85	26	25	51
t10	Braydon Buckingham	2022-24	83	26	39	65

==== Willmar Warhawks Single Season Points Leaders ====
Kyle Wendorf (Richfield, MN) set the Willmar Warhawks NA3HL single season points record during the 2016-17 regular season, the franchise's first season in Willmar, with 56 points.

===== NA3HL Regular Season - Updated Following 2025-26 Season =====
Rank	Player	Age	Season	GP	G	A	Pts
1	Kyle Wendorf	20	2016-17	46	24	32	56
2	Jeremiah Konkel	19	2021-22	43	25	27	52
3	Brandan Holt	20	2019-20	45	17	34	51
4	Anthony Foster	19	2021-22	45	18	32	50
5	Michael Sweetland	20	2022-23	42	17	32	49
t6	Braden Shea	19	2017-18	47	17	30	47
t6	Ben Luedtke	20	2021-22	40	18	29	47
t8	Collin Kerchoff	20	2021-22	41	14	30	44
t8	Nathan Hinze	20	2024-25	47	12	32	44
t8	Aidan Callaghan	19	2024-25	46	22	22	44

==== Willmar Warhawks Single Season Goal Leaders ====
Tyler Misialek (West Fargo, ND) set the Willmar Warhawks NA3HL single season goals record during the 2023-24 regular season, with 28 goals.

===== NA3HL Regular Season - Updated Following 2025-26 Season =====
Rank	Player	Age	Season	GP	G	A	Pts
1	Tyler Misialek	20	2023-24	46	28	14	42
2	Jeremiah Konkel	19	2021-22	43	25	27	52
t3	Kyle Wendorf	20	2016-17	46	24	32	56
t3	Gabe Adams	20	2025-26	45	24	11	35
5	Aidan Callaghan	19	2024-25	46	22	22	44
6	Mason Wanka	19	2024-25	32	21	22	43
7	Hudson Zinda	20	2023-24	30	20	12	32
t8	Eli Slagter	19	2018-19	41	18	21	39
t8	Anthony Foster	19	2021-22	45	18	32	50
t8	Ben Luedtke	20	2021-22	40	18	29	47
t8	Tyler Misialek	19	2022-23	41	18	15	33
t8	Gabe Adams	19	2024-25	47	18	12	30

=== Franchise Statistical Leaders ===
The franchise statistical leaders consider all historical statistics commencing with the franchise's inaugural NA3HL season (2011–12), including all NA3HL seasons for the Minnesota Flying Aces (2011-2016) & Willmar Warhawks (2016–present).

==== Franchise Career Points Leaders ====
Brandan Holt (Madison Heights, MI) set the franchise NA3HL career points record during the 2019-20 season with 114 career points.

===== NA3HL Regular + Post-Season Combined - Updated Following 2025-26 Season =====
Rank	Player	Years	GP	G	A	Pts
1	Brandan Holt	2017-20	119	40	74	114
2	Michael Sweetland	2020-23	107	44	69	113
3	Kyle Wendorf	2015-17	93	46	55	101
4	Tyler Misialek	2021-24	131	59	38	97
5	Eli Slagter	2017-20	133	37	52	89
6	Aidan Callaghan	2024-26	74	34	50	84
7	Mason Wanka	2024-26	55	33	39	72
8	Jake Mullendore	2013-15	74	34	37	71
9	Jeremiah Konkel	2020-22	85	31	39	70
10	Gabe Adams	2024-26	94	42	24	66

==== Franchise Career Goal Leaders ====
Tyler Misialek (West Fargo, ND) set the franchise NA3HL career goals record during the 2023-24 season with 59 career goals.

===== NA3HL Regular + Post-Season Combined - Updated Following 2025-26 Season =====
Rank	Player	Years	GP	G	A	Pts
1	Tyler Misialek	2021-24	131	59	38	97
2	Kyle Wendorf	2015-17	93	46	55	101
3	Michael Sweetland	2020-23	107	44	69	113
4	Gabe Adams	2024-26	94	42	24	66
5	Brandan Holt	2017-20	119	40	74	114
6	Eli Slagter	2017-20	133	37	52	89
t7	Jake Mullendore	2013-15	74	34	37	71
t7	Aidan Callaghan	2024-26	74	34	50	84
9	Mason Wanka	2024-26	55	33	39	72
10	Jeremiah Konkel	2020-22	85	31	39	70

==== Franchise Single Season Points Leaders ====
Parker Tomczyk (Mosinee, WI) set the franchise NA3HL single season points record during the franchise's inaugural NA3HL season (2011–12) with 59 points during the regular season.

===== NA3HL Regular Season - Updated Following 2025-26 Season =====
Rank	Player	Age	Season	GP	G	A	Pts
1	Parker Tomczyk	20	2011-12	43	29	30	59
2	Kyle Wendorf	20	2016-17	46	24	32	56
3	Jeremiah Konkel	19	2021-22	43	25	27	52
4	Brandan Holt	20	2019-20	45	17	34	51
5	Anthony Foster	19	2021-22	45	18	32	50
6	Michael Sweetland	20	2022-23	42	17	32	49
7	Paul Sorenson	19	2011-12	48	10	38	48
t8	Jake Mullendore	19	2013-14	48	24	23	47
t8	Braden Shea	19	2017-18	47	17	30	47
t8	Ben Luedtke	20	2021-22	40	18	29	47

==== Franchise Single Season Goal Leaders ====
Parker Tomczyk (Mosinee, WI) set the franchise NA3HL single season goal record during the franchise's inaugural NA3HL season (2011–12) with 29 goals during the regular season.

===== NA3HL Regular Season - Updated Following 2025-26 Season =====
Rank	Player	Age	Season	GP	G	A	Pts
1	Parker Tomczyk	20	2011-12	43	29	30	59
2	Tyler Misialek	20	2023-24	46	28	14	42
3	Jeremiah Konkel	19	2021-22	43	25	27	52
t4	Stephen Langford	19	2011-12	40	24	20	44
t4	Liam Johnston	18	2011-12	46	24	10	34
t4	Jake Mullendore	19	2013-14	48	24	23	47
t4	Kyle Wendorf	20	2016-17	46	24	32	56
t4	Gabe Adams	20	2025-26	45	24	11	35
t9	Kyle Wendorf	19	2015-16	47	22	23	45
t9	Aidan Callaghan	19	2024-25	46	22	22	44

== Alumni ==
- Blake Anderson (2014) - Kirkland Lake Gold Miners; UW-River Falls (NCAA Division III)
- Alec Brandrup (2013) - Melville Millionaires; Norwich University (NCAA Division III)
- Giacomo Del Ponte (2011) - HC Red Ice Martigny-Verbier
- Brad Hauser (2013) - St. Mary's University (NCAA Division III)
- Luc Kilgore (2011) - Johnson & Wales University (NCAA Division III); Knoxville Ice Bears, Macon Mayhem (SPHL)
- Johno May (2013) - Minnesota Wilderness; American International College (NCAA Division I)
- Lee Melde (2010) - Duluth Clydesdales; State University of New York at Canton (NCAA Division III)
- Dylan Nelson (2013) - Waywayseecappo Wolverines; UW-Superior (NCAA Division III)
- Tyler Pionk (2012) - Minot Minotauros; Western New England University (NCAA Division III)
- André Pison (2013) - Denmark U18 and U20; Wenatchee Wild; Wichita Falls Wildcats
- Michael Raynee (2010) - Botkyrka HC
- Tate Sykes (2013) - Odessa Jackalopes; UW-Eau Claire (NCAA Division III)
- Mason Wyman (2013) - Odessa Jackalopes; Gustavus (NCAA Division III)
