= Joel Rechlicz =

American ice hockey player

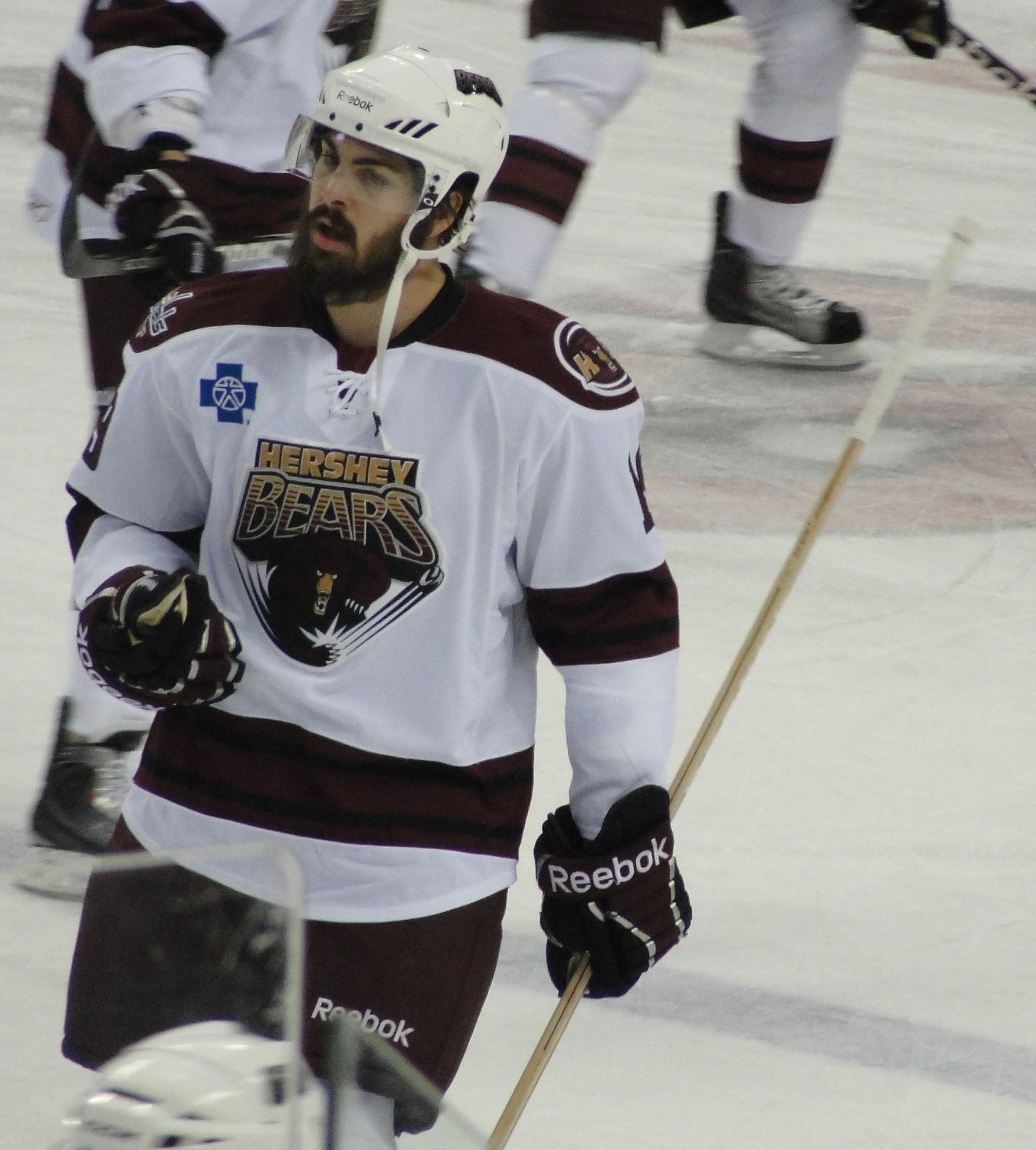
- Born: June 14, 1987 (age 39) Brookfield, Wisconsin, U.S.
- Height: 6 ft 4 in (193 cm)
- Weight: 235 lb (107 kg; 16 st 11 lb)
- Position: Right wing
- Shot: Right
- Played for: New York Islanders; Washington Capitals
- NHL draft: Undrafted
- Playing career: 2007–2017

Joel Rechlicz (/ˈrɛklɪʃ/ REK-lish; born June 14, 1987) is an American former professional ice hockey player. Rechlicz is well known for playing the enforcer role. By signing a three-year entry-level contract with the New York Islanders in May 2008, Rechlicz became the first player from the relaunched International Hockey League, formerly known as the United Hockey League, to play a game in the National Hockey League. He played for the National Hockey League's New York Islanders and the Washington Capitals.

== Playing career ==
Joel briefly played high school hockey for Brookfield Central High School in Brookfield, Wisconsin. At the age of 16, he began play for the St. Paul Lakers in the Minnesota Junior Hockey League in the 2003–04 season. Rechlicz played three games in the North American Hockey League for the Santa Fe Roadrunners in 2004–05. He then moved onto the Northern Michigan Black Bears of the Northern Ontario Junior Hockey League for a season and a half. He had brief stops with the Des Moines Buccaneers and Indiana Ice of the United States Hockey League in 2005–06. He then entered major junior hockey with a brief call up to the Gatineau Olympiques of the Quebec Major Junior Hockey League (QMJHL) in 2006.

Rechlicz played major junior hockey for the Chicoutimi Saguenéens of the QMJHL. After the completion of the 2006–07 junior season, Rechlicz made his professional debut with the Chicago Hounds of the United Hockey League (UHL). He played two games with the Chicago Hounds in 2006–07 and then began the 2007–08 season with the Kalamazoo Wings of the International Hockey League (IHL), a rebranded UHL. Although he received little ice time during his 25-game stint with Kalamazoo, Rechlicz received a call-up from the Albany River Rats of the American Hockey League (AHL).

Before the 2008–09 season, Rechlicz signed a three-year entry-level contract with the New York Islanders. On March 5, 2009, Rechlicz made his NHL debut with the Islanders, recording an assist in the game. Rechlicz went on to play 17 games in the NHL that season, with stops in the ECHL and AHL.

During the 2009–10 season, Rechlicz made the Islanders roster out of training camp and started the year in the NHL. After six appearances, he was assigned to the Bridgeport Sound Tigers for more playing time. On July 13, 2010, Rechlicz and the Islanders came to a mutual agreement to terminate of his contract for reasons unknown and was put on unconditional waivers. Rechlicz became an unrestricted free agent after clearing waivers on July 14, 2010.

On July 29, 2010, Rechlicz signed a one-year AHL deal with the Hershey Bears and was signed to a one-year extension for the 2011–12 season on July 29, 2011. After signing with affiliate Hershey Bears, the Washington Capitals brought up Rechlicz midway through the season. After three games, Washington placed Joel Rechlicz on waivers and he was sent down to return to the Bears on February 4, 2012.

On July 12, 2012, Rechlicz signed as a free agent to a one-year, two-way contract with the Phoenix Coyotes. During the 2012–13 season, the Coyotes traded him back to the Washington Capitals in exchange for forward Matt Clackson on April 2, 2013. On June 26, 2013, he was given a one-year extension with the Capitals.

An unrestricted free agent, Rechlicz signed a one-year, two-way contract with the Minnesota Wild on July 2, 2014. Rechlicz never appeared in a game for Minnesota, playing the duration of his contract with AHL affiliate, the Iowa Wild.

After signing a one-year AHL deal with the Grand Rapids Griffins, on October 5, 2015, Rechlicz was suspended three games by the AHL for a charging incident in a preseason game against the Lake Erie Monsters.

Rechlicz continued his tenure in the AHL, signing as a free agent with the Bakersfield Condors on August 31, 2016.

== Career statistics ==
=== Regular season and playoffs ===
			Regular season					Playoffs
Season	Team	League	GP	G	A	Pts	PIM	GP	G	A	Pts	PIM
2004–05	Santa Fe Roadrunners	NAHL	3	0	1	1	29	—	—	—	—	—
2004–05	Northern Michigan Black Bears	NOJHL	25	3	1	4	54	14	2	2	4	16
2005–06	Northern Michigan Black Bears	NOJHL	6	0	2	2	11	—	—	—	—	—
2005–06	Des Moines Buccaneers	USHL	2	0	0	0	4	—	—	—	—	—
2005–06	Gatineau Olympiques	QMJHL	3	0	0	0	17	—	—	—	—	—
2005–06	Indiana Ice	USHL	2	0	0	0	16	—	—	—	—	—
2006–07	Chicoutimi Sagueneens	QMJHL	55	0	1	1	159	1	0	0	0	2
2006–07	Chicago Hounds	UHL	2	0	0	0	9	—	—	—	—	—
2007–08	Kalamazoo Wings	IHL	25	1	0	1	100	—	—	—	—	—
2007–08	Albany River Rats	AHL	25	0	1	1	106	—	—	—	—	—
2008–09	Utah Grizzlies	ECHL	45	0	1	1	110	—	—	—	—	—
2008–09	Bridgeport Sound Tigers	AHL	4	0	0	0	12	—	—	—	—	—
2008–09	New York Islanders	NHL	17	0	1	1	68	—	—	—	—	—
2009–10	New York Islanders	NHL	6	0	0	0	27	—	—	—	—	—
2009–10	Bridgeport Sound Tigers	AHL	21	0	0	0	128	—	—	—	—	—
2010–11	Hershey Bears	AHL	28	1	0	1	132	—	—	—	—	—
2011–12	Hershey Bears	AHL	44	1	1	2	267	—	—	—	—	—
2011–12	Washington Capitals	NHL	3	0	0	0	10	—	—	—	—	—
2012–13	Portland Pirates	AHL	36	0	0	0	149	—	—	—	—	—
2012–13	Hershey Bears	AHL	4	0	0	0	5	—	—	—	—	—
2013–14	Hershey Bears	AHL	25	1	1	2	87	—	—	—	—	—
2014–15	Iowa Wild	AHL	20	1	0	1	60	—	—	—	—	—
2015–16	Grand Rapids Griffins	AHL	12	0	0	0	35	—	—	—	—	—
2016–17	Bakersfield Condors	AHL	15	0	0	0	54	—	—	—	—	—
AHL totals			234	4	3	7	1035	—	—	—	—	—
NHL totals			26	0	1	1	105	—	—	—	—	—

== Transactions ==
- May 6, 2008 – signed by the New York Islanders as a free agent to a three-year entry-level deal
- July 13, 2010 – Rechlicz and Islanders agreed to a mutual termination of his contract.
- July 29, 2010 – signed a contract with the Calder Cup champion Hershey Bears of the American Hockey League, the top affiliate of the Washington Capitals.
- January 30, 2012 – signed a one-year contract with the Washington Capitals.
- July 11, 2012 – signed a one-year two-way contract with the Phoenix Coyotes.
- April 2, 2013 – traded to the Washington Capitals.
- June 26, 2013 – signed a one- year contract extension with the Washington Capitals.
- July 2, 2014 – signed a one-year two way contract with the Minnesota Wild.
