= Blaine Energy =

- City: Blaine, Minnesota
- League: North American 3 Hockey League
- Founded: 2015
- Folded: 2017
- Home arena: Fogerty Arena
- Colors: Black and yellow
- General manager: Todd Sanden
- Head coach: Todd Sanden

Franchise history
- 2011–2015: Maple Grove Energy
- 2015–2017: Blaine Energy

The Blaine Energy were a Tier III Junior A ice hockey team that played in the North American 3 Hockey League (NA3HL). The team played their home games at the 1,200-seat Fogerty Arena located in Blaine, Minnesota.

== History ==
Founded in 2011, the Maple Grove Energy replaced the recently folded Minnesota Wildcats in Maple Grove. During the 2015 off-season the Energy relocated to Blaine, Minnesota, and changed their name accordingly.

Prior to the 2015–16 season, the Energy were members of the Minnesota Junior Hockey League (MnJHL). At the conclusion of the 2014–15 season the majority of the MnJHL members joined the United States Premier Hockey League by creating the USPHL-Midwest Division and the MnJHL ceased operations. After one season, the USPHL-Midwest was split into the Elite and USP3 Divisions with the Energy added to the Elite Division for 2016–17.

In February 2017, owner Cal Ballard announced that he had given up management operations of the Energy to the Dibble Group (a management group headed by the Janesville Jets head coach in the North American Hockey League) in October 2016. His reasons were due to the changing landscape of Tier III junior hockey and the difficulties of fielding a team. He assumed the Energy would be ceasing operations at the end of the season.

After the team's dissolution, the franchise's position in the USPHL was replaced by the Minnesota Moose.

== Season-by-season records ==
| Season | GP | W | L | OTL | Pts | GF | GA | Regular season finish | Playoffs |
|---|---|---|---|---|---|---|---|---|---|
Maple Grove Energy
| 2011–12 | 48 | 1 | 44 | 3 | 13 | 114 | 384 | 8th, MnJHL | Did not qualify |
| 2012–13 | 50 | 25 | 22 | 3 | 53 | 191 | 207 | 4th, MnJHL-MN | Lost Division Quarterfinals, 1–2 vs. Steele County Blades |
| 2013–14 | 46 | 31 | 13 | 2 | 64 | 179 | 222 | 2nd, MnJHL-MN | Won Division Quarterfinals, 2–0 vs. Edina Lakers; Lost Division Semifinals, 0–2 vs. Hudson Crusaders |
| 2014–15 | 42 | 16 | 24 | 2 | 34 | 187 | 246 | 6th of 8, Minn. Div. 10th of 14, MnJHL | Lost Division Quarterfinals, 0–2 vs. Hudson Crusaders |
Blaine Energy
| 2015–16 | 48 | 8 | 38 | 2 | 18 | 99 | 303 | 9th of 9, West Conf. 16th of 17, USPHL-Midwest | Did not qualify |
| 2016–17 | 44 | 5 | 37 | 2 | 12 | 67 | 319 | 7th of 8, Midwest Div. 24th of 27, USPHL-Elite | Lost Div. Quarterfinals, 0–2 (Dells Ducks) |

== Alumni ==
The franchise has produced some alumni playing in higher levels of junior hockey, NCAA Division III, and ACHA college programs.
