= Minnesota Owls =

Junior ice hockey team

- City: Isanti, Minnesota
- League: MnJHL
- Founded: 1993
- Folded: 2015
- Home arena: David C. Johnson Arena
- Colors: Green, Khaki, Black, and White
- Owner(s): 501c3
- General manager: Cindy Kuznia
- Head coach: Chad Kuznia

Franchise history
- 1993–1997: North Metro Owls
- 1997–2015: Minnesota Owls

The Minnesota Owls were a Tier III Junior ice hockey team and member of the Minnesota Junior Hockey League (MnJHL). The team played their games at the David C. Johnson Arena located in Isanti, Minnesota. Prior the 2015–16 season, the Owls had joined the United States Premier Hockey League (USPHL) - Midwest Division along with majority of the other former MnJHL teams. However, on September 1, 2015, they announced on their website that the team had gone dormant for the season.

The Owls are a non-profit corporation and sanctioned by USA Hockey.

== History ==
Founded in 1993 by Dick Jenkins, the team was originally known as the North Metro Owls in the Minnesota Junior Hockey League (MnJHL). The team was reorganized before the 1997–98 season, renaming to the current Minnesota Owls.

The Owls won the MnJHL playoffs in 1994 and 1998; placed second in 1995, 1996, 2000, 2001, 2007 and 2008; placed third in 1997. As a result, the Owls went on to represent the MnJHL at the USA Hockey Tier III National Tournament.

The 2015–16 would have been the 22nd season in franchise history, but the first outside of the MnJHL as the Owls were among the 12 teams that left the MnJHL to join the United States Premier Hockey League in a new Midwest Division. The MnJHL teams were joined by all the teams from the former Midwest Junior Hockey League, former independent teams, and expansion teams to make up the fourth Tier III division under the USPHL umbrella. However, on September 1, 2015, they announced on their website that the team would go dormant prior to their first season in the USPHL-Midwest.

== Season records ==
Season	W	L	T	OTL	GF	GA	Pts	Regular season finish	Playoffs
1999–00	24	10	0	2	207	147	50	2nd, MNJHL	
2000–01	27	8	-	1	192	128	55	2nd, MNJHL	
2001–02	9	28	-	5	154	242	23	8th, MNJHL	
2002–03	3	37	-	2	92	291	8	7th, MNJHL	
2003–04	7	30	1	2	119	232	17	6th, MNJHL	
2004–05	26	21	0	1	200	199	53	4th, MNJHL	
2005–06	17	24	4	3	160	191	41	5th, MNJHL	
2006–07	27	10	3	0	193	127	57	2nd, MNJHL	
2007–08	29	19	0	0	214	165	58	4th, MNJHL	
2008–09	32	14	0	2	240	168	66	3rd, MNJHL	
2009–10	28	20	0	2	198	153	58	5th, MNJHL	
2010–11	23	19	-	3	154	153	49	4th, MNJHL	
2011–12	26	19	-	3	204	166	55	3rd, MNJHL	
2012–13	16	30	-	4	162	271	36	7th, MNJHL-MN	Lost division quarterfinal
2013–14	10	31	-	5	121	242	25	8th, MNJHL-MN	Lost division quarterfinal
2014–15	6	35	-	1	82	277	13	7 of 8 Minn Div; 12 of 14 MNJHL	Lost div. quarterfinal, 0-2 (Ducks)
