= Philadelphia Flyers Junior Hockey Club =

- City: Voorhees, New Jersey
- League: USPHL Premier
- Founded: 2013
- Home arena: Flyers Skate Zone, Voorhees
- Colors: Orange, Black and White
- Owner: Comcast Spectacor
- General manager: Jared Beach
- Head coach: Jared Beach
- Affiliates: Philadelphia Flyers (NHL)

The Philadelphia Flyers Junior Hockey Club (also known as the Philadelphia Flyers Elite or the USPHL Flyers) were a Tier III junior ice hockey team in the United States Premier Hockey League Premier Division. The franchise was originally based in Voorhees, New Jersey, at the Flyers Skate Zone. In 2017, the franchise was sold to Delaware Hockey, LLC and it became the Lightning Hockey Club with plans to play in the USPHL's 2017–18 season out of Newark, Delaware. The team was removed from the league's member list in September 2017 prior to ever playing a game.

The team was created in 2013 as one of the founding members of the United States Premier Hockey League (USPHL) Premier Division, the highest level at the time for the league. It was owned and operated under the Philadelphia Flyers NHL team and parent owner Comcast Spectacor.

== History ==
The program was developed by the Philadelphia Flyers in 2013 to provide a junior-level program at the highest level of competition for aspiring hockey players in the Greater Philadelphia region. After four seasons in the USPHL Premier Division, the ownership sold the USPHL Flyers to the Lightning Hockey Club. The new owners then relocated the team to Newark, Delaware, in 2017. However, the team failed to make it to the start of their first season in Delaware.

In addition to entering the USPHL-Premier Division, the Flyers Skate Zone also announced that their Team Comcast 16U and 18U midget teams would participate in the USPHL 16U and 18U Divisions. In 2016, Team Comcast left the USPHL for the Atlantic Youth Hockey League and were renamed Virtua Hockey.

== Season-by-season records ==
Season	GP	W	L	OTL	SOL	PTS	GF	GA	PIM	Regular season finish	Playoffs
Philadelphia Flyers Junior Hockey Club
2013–14	48	28	17	1	2	59	176	141	707	4th of 9 USPHL-Premier	Lost in 1st round vs. Islanders Hockey Club
2014–15	50	32	10	0	8	72	216	153	—	3rd of 11; USPHL-Premier	Won Quarterfinals, 2–0 vs. Bay State Breakers; Won Semifinals, 2–0 vs. Islanders Hockey Club; Lost Finals, 0–2 vs. Jersey Hitmen
2015–16	44	24	15	—	5	53	158	150	—	6th of 12; USPHL-Premier	Lost Quarterfinals, 0–2 vs. Boston Junior Bruins
2016–17	45	17	22	—	6	40	131	175	—	8th of 10; USPHL-Premier	Lost Play-in Game, 1–3 vs. P.A.L. Junior Islanders
