= Twin Cities Northern Lights =

Northern Lights Hockey
- City: Bloomington, Minnesota
- League: MNJHL
- Division: Minnesota
- Founded: 1996
- Home arena: Bloomington Ice Garden
- Colors: Navy, Teal, and Silver
- Owner: 501(c)(3) nonprofit organization
- General manager: Ross and Stephanie Smith
- Media: Sun Current

Franchise history
- 1993-2002: South Suburban Steers
- 2002-2014: Twin Cities Northern Lights Hockey

Northern Lights Hockey is a nonprofit organization that fielded a Tier III Jr. A ice hockey team located in Bloomington, Minnesota, USA, a southwest suburb of Minneapolis-Saint Paul. Northern Lights Hockey played in the Minnesota Junior Hockey League (MnJHL), a college preparatory league. Although the nonprofit does not have a current hockey team, the organization still exists and provides other sports services while it keeps the option open of fielding hockey teams at various youth / junior levels.

Between 2002 and 2013, the team played a 40-50 game regular season schedule and post-season playoffs. Throughout the season the Northern Lights play games and scrimmages against NCAA Division III teams and ACHA college teams.

The 501(c)(3) nonprofit organization has been managed by Ross and Stephanie Smith, who joined the hockey business after working several years in hockey sports medicine, specializing in concussions.

== History ==
After the South Suburban Steers were reorganized in 2002, the team was renamed and moved to Bloomington, Minnesota. They play their games at the Bloomington Ice Garden, which was Team USA's practice rink in preparation for the 1980 Winter Olympics "Miracle on Ice." Many of the student-athletes attend Normandale Community College, take online courses, or attend a local high school.

The Northern Lights have played international exhibition games against teams in Slovakia, Czech Republic, Bulgaria and Italy during the 2006 Winter Olympics. The team and members of the Rotaract Club of the Athlete Village served as Sports Goodwill Peace Ambassadors during the 2010 Winter Olympics in Vancouver, British Columbia, Canada.

The Northern Lights were MNJHL regular season champions and Bush Cup winners in 2002-03, 2011–12 and 2012–13; national tournament semifinalists in both 2003 and 2006. In 2013 Twin Cities advanced to the USA Hockey National Championship game, falling short to the North Iowa Bulls. The team also represented the Minnesota Junior Hockey League at the 2010 and 2012 USA Hockey National Tournament.

On August 25, 2014, the team announced it would temporarily suspend operations for the 2014-15 season with plans to return for the following season. However, during the 2014-15 season, 13 of the remaining 14 teams in the MnJHL announced they would joining the United States Premier Hockey League for the following season in a new Midwest Division. The MnJHL would subsequently suspend operations for the 2015-16 season with no announcement for the future of the Northern Lights.

== Season-by-season ==
| Season | Wins | Losses | Ties | OTL | Points | Finish | Playoffs |
| 2002-03 | 32 | 10 | 0 | 0 | 65 | 1st | Won Bush Cup. Nationals appearance |
| 2003-04 | 16 | 21 | 0 | 3 | 35 | 4th | |
| 2004-05 | 31 | 15 | 0 | 2 | 64 | 3rd | |
| 2005-06 | 34 | 6 | 4 | 4 | 76 | 2nd | Bush Cup runner-up. Nationals semifinalist. |
| 2006-07 | 18 | 20 | 1 | 1 | 38 | 4th | |
| 2007-08 | | | | | | | |
| 2008-09 | | | | | | | |
| 2009-10 | 31 | 16 | 0 | 3 | 65 | 3rd | Bush Cup runner-up. Nationals appearance. |
| 2010-11 | 15 | 26 | 0 | 4 | 34 | 7th | |
| 2011-12 | 42 | 5 | 0 | 1 | 85 | 1st | Won Bush Cup. Nationals appearance. |
| 2012-13 | 45 | 4 | 0 | 1 | 91 | 1st | Won Bush Cup. Nationals runner-up. |
| 2013-14 | 27 | 15 | 0 | 2 | 58 | 4th | |

== Alumni ==
Players have advanced to play higher levels of Junior hockey (USHL, NAHL), NCAA and ACHA college hockey as well as professional hockey.

Coaching staff have also advanced through the Northern Lights coach development program which intentionally creates first-time employment opportunities for strong candidates. Six Northern Lights Hockey coaches have served and advanced including:

- AJ Degenhardt - Coulee Region Chill
- Jason Dobes - (player and coach). Janesville Jets, Dells Ducks, Butte Cobras
- Eric Fink - Owatonna Express, Tri-City Storm, Portland Winterhawks (scout)
- Josh Hauge - Fairbanks Ice Dogs, Tri-City Storm, Fargo Force, Clarkson University
- Erik Largen - Fairbanks Ice Dogs, Coulee Region Chill, Tri-City Storm, Marian University
- Lincoln Nguyen - El Paso Rhinos, Coulee Region Chill, Marian University
- Jon Jonasson (player) - Phoenix Polar Bears, Steele County Blades, Helena Bighorns
- Tim Hansen (player)
