= Red Bank Armory =

Ice rink in Red Bank, New Jersey

Coordinates: 40°20′50″N 74°4′19″W

The Red Bank Armory is a former armory located at 76 Chestnut Street in Red Bank, New Jersey that has been converted to ice rink.

== History ==
The armory was built in 1914 for Troop B of the National Guard's Red Bank Cavalry and featured a 100x144-foot equestrian riding hall. By the 1950s, it was used to store old tanks. In 1998 Armory was converted to an ice rink, and is home to the Red Bank Generals, members of the New Jersey Youth Hockey League.

== Red Bank Generals ==
Red Bank Generals
- City: Red Bank, New Jersey
- League: United States Premier Hockey League; Premier Division
- Division: Atlantic
- Founded: 2024
- Home arena: Red Bank Armory
- Colors: Green, gold, and black
- General manager: Jack Callahan
- Head coach: Jack Callahan
- Affiliates: Muskegon Lumberjacks

Franchise history
- 2024–present: Red Bank Generals

The Red Bank Generals are a Tier III junior ice hockey team playing in the United States Premier Hockey League's (USPHL) Premier division. The Generals play their home games at Red Bank Armory.

=== Team history ===
The Red Bank Generals were established as a youth hockey organization in 2002, using the Red Bank Armory as their home rink. In April of 2024, the USPHL announced the addition of the Red Bank Generals to the Premier Division.

=== Season-by-season records ===
Season	GP	W	L	OTL	Pts	GF	GA	Regular season finish	Playoffs
2024–25	44	28	12	4	60	193	153	t-3rd of 11, Atlantic Div. 22nd of 73, USPHL Premier	Lost Div. Quarterfinal series, 0–2 (Mercer Chiefs)
2025–26	44	34	8	2	70	268	75	2nd of 10, Atlantic Div. 12th of 77, USPHL Premier	Won Div. Quarterfinal series, 2-0 (Rockets Hockey Club ) Lost Div Semifinal 0-2 (Connecticut Jr. Rangers )

The summer of 2024 the Red Bank Generals were accepted as an expansion team into the USPHL Premier hockey league.

== See also ==
- New Jersey National Guard
- National Guard Militia Museum of New Jersey
- High school ice hockey in New Jersey
- Atlantic City Armory
- Jersey City Armory
