= Minnesota Wildcats =

- City: Maple Grove, Minnesota
- League: MnJHL
- Founded: 2004
- Home arena: Maple Grove Community Center
- Colors: Navy, Orange, and White
- Owner: Cal Ballard
- General manager: Phillip Diskerud
- Head coach: Jon Liesmaki

Franchise history
- 2004–2005: Twin Bridges Lightning
- 2005–2011: Minnesota Wildcats

The Minnesota Wildcats were a Tier III Junior A ice hockey team playing in the Minnesota Junior Hockey League (MnJHL). The team played their home games at the 1,200-seat Maple Grove Community Center located in Maple Grove, Minnesota.

== History ==
Founded in 2004 as the Twin Bridges (later St. Louis) Lightning, the franchise was sold and relocated to Maple Grove, Minnesota in 2005 to become the Minnesota Wildcats.

The Wildcats normally played 48 game regular season games, in addition to showcase and post-season tournament games. In 2011, the Wildcats folded and were replaced by the Maple Grove Energy. The Energy would have different owners but would carry over many of the former Wildcats coaches and staff.

== Season-by-season records ==
Season	GP	W	L	T	OTL	Pts	GF	GA	Regular season finish	Playoffs
Twin Bridges Lightning
2004–05	48	11	34	2	1	25	133	252	7th, MnJHL	
Minnesota Wildcats
2005–06	48	13	30	4	1	31	155	225	6th, MnJHL	
2006–07	40	6	29	2	3	17	148	268	5th, MnJHL	
2007–08	48	6	39	2	1	15	110	319	9th, MnJHL	
2008–09	48	10	36	—	2	22	184	364	9th, MnJHL	Did not qualify
2009–10	50	4	44	—	2	10	81	388	9th, MnJHL	Did not qualify
2010–11	45	6	38	—	1	13	121	255	8th, MnJHL	Did not qualify

== Alumni ==
The Wildcats have produced a number of alumni playing in higher levels of junior hockey, NCAA Division III, and ACHA college programs.
