= Matīss Kivlenieks =

Latvian ice hockey player (1996–2021)

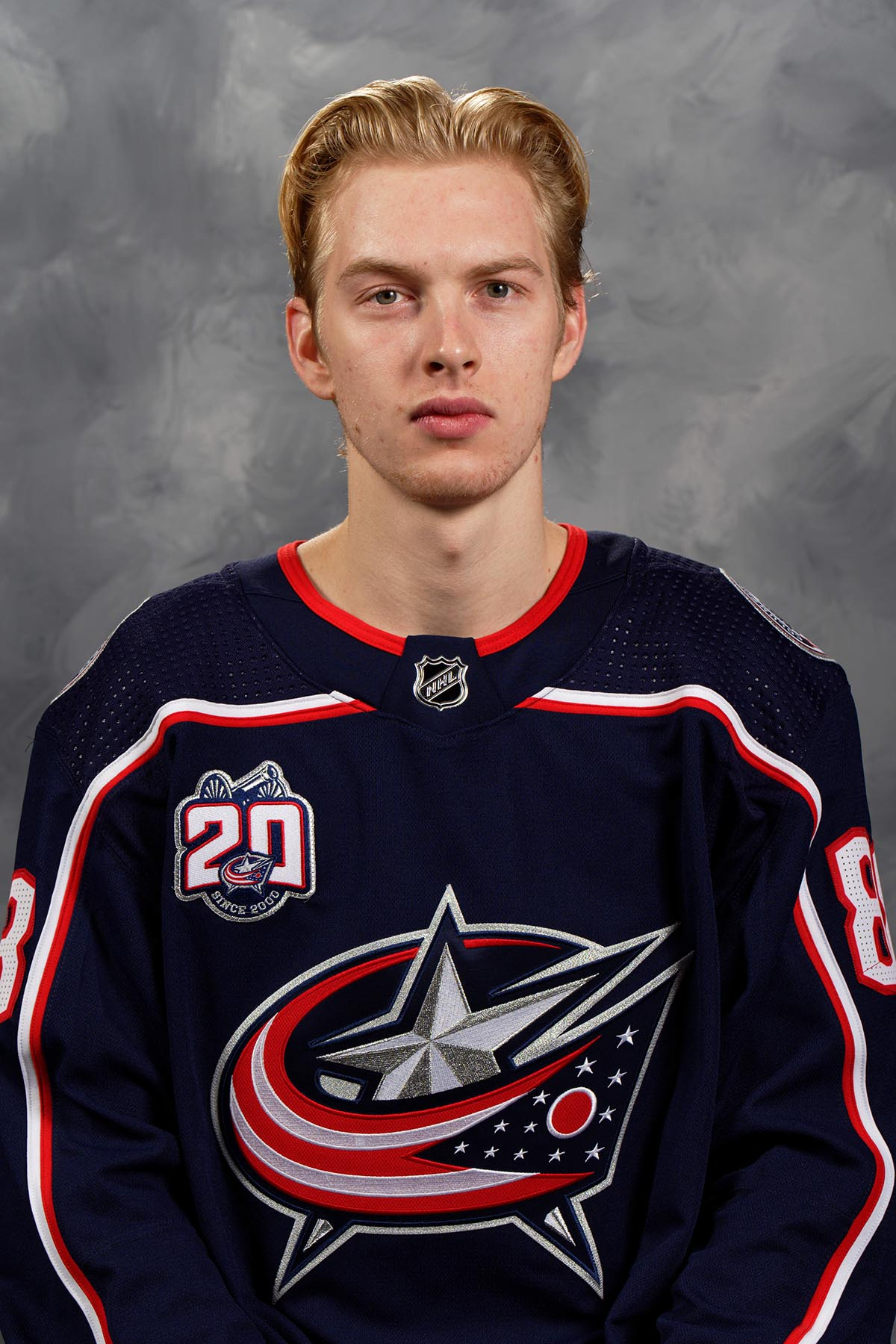
- Kivlenieks with the Columbus Blue Jackets in 2020
- Born: 26 August 1996 Riga, Latvia
- Died: 4 July 2021 (aged 24) Novi, Michigan, U.S.
- Height: 6 ft 2 in (188 cm)
- Weight: 178 lb (81 kg; 12 st 10 lb)
- Position: Goaltender
- Caught: Left
- Played for: Prizma Riga; Columbus Blue Jackets
- National team: Latvia
- NHL draft: Undrafted
- Playing career: 2012–2021

Matīss Edmunds Kivlenieks (26 August 1996 – 4 July 2021) was a Latvian professional ice hockey goaltender who played for Prizma Riga of the Latvian Hockey Higher League (LHL), the Cleveland Monsters of the American Hockey League (AHL), and the Columbus Blue Jackets of the National Hockey League (NHL) between 2012 and 2021. Kivlenieks died on 4 July 2021 after being struck by fireworks.

== Early life ==
Kivlenieks was born in Riga, Latvia. His father died of natural causes when he was young. His mother and stepfather are restaurateurs. Kivlenieks had a younger sister. He fluently spoke Latvian, Russian, and after playing in the United States, English. He started playing ice hockey at age 3 or 4 after watching his cousin's practices. At age 5, he began playing as a goaltender.

== Playing career ==
=== Latvia ===
As a 15-year-old, Kivlenieks played one game for HK Prizma Riga of the Latvian Hockey Higher League (LHL) during the 2011–12 season, posting a 9.52 goals against average (GAA).

=== Junior ===
Kivlenieks opted to leave Latvia in 2013 at age 16 and continue his development in the North American junior leagues in order to pursue his goal of joining the NHL. Kivlenieks was encouraged to try and join the North American Hockey League by Kārlis Zirnis, a coach for the Latvian national team and a scout for the NAHL. Kivlenieks's first team in North America was the Edina Lakers, which played in the Tier III Minnesota Junior Hockey League. After the 2013–14 season, he unsuccessfully tried out for the Janesville Jets of the NAHL, and again played for the Lakers, now the Forest Lake Lakers. In February 2015, Kivlenieks was called up to the Coulee Region Chill of the NAHL as an emergency backup, losing 5–3 to the Janesville Jets. In 2015, Kivlenieks was named to the MJHL's second all-star team.

In the 2015–16 season, Kivlenieks joined the Coulee Region Chill as a permanent player. Kivlenieks reached Tier I junior hockey in the 2016–17 USHL season, leading the Sioux City Musketeers to win the Anderson Cup as the league's regular season champions. He had a 1.85 goals-against average and .932 save percentage, with both stats being the second best in league history. In the playoffs, his team reached the final, but lost the Clark Cup in overtime of Game 5 of the Best of Five final. Kivlenieks was named to the First All-Star team, and won the league's Goaltender and Player of the Year awards.

=== Professional ===
Despite going undrafted after his final season with the Sioux City Musketeers, Kivlenieks signed a three-year, entry-level contract in May 2017 with the Columbus Blue Jackets worth $2,497,500. The following season, he was assigned to the minors, joining the Blue Jackets' American Hockey League affiliate team, the Cleveland Monsters.

During the 2019–20 season, Kivlenieks was recalled on multiple occasions to the Blue Jackets before starting in his NHL debut, earning his first NHL win in a 2–1 victory against the New York Rangers on 19 January 2020. He stopped 31 of the 32 shots he faced and finished the night with a .969 save percentage.

Kivlenieks started the final two games of the 2020–21 Blue Jackets season, both against the Detroit Red Wings. On 7 May 2021, he made 31 saves on 34 shots in a 5–2 loss. The next night, in what would be his final NHL appearance, Kivlenieks saved 33 of 37 shots in a 5–4 overtime win. After the end of the season, Kivlenieks was considered a contender for the backup goaltender position in Columbus.

== International play ==
By 2013, Kivlenieks had played for Latvia's U-17 national hockey team. Kivlenieks played for the junior Latvian national team at the 2015 and 2016 IIHF World Juniors Division I Group A and was named best goaltender at both events. In 2015, his team won bronze, and in 2016 his team won gold and promotion to the top division, with Kivlenieks having a tournament-leading 1.71 GAA and a .941 save percentage.

Kivlenieks was first selected to the senior Latvian national team, serving as the third-string goaltender at the 2018 IIHF World Championship. He later made his World Championship debut with Latvia as the host country of the 2021 IIHF World Championship. Kivlenieks was used as the starting goaltender as he led Latvia to its first-ever win over Canada and also its first loss against Kazakhstan during the group phase.

== Death ==
On 4 July 2021, Kivlenieks was fatally injured during a fireworks malfunction while at the home of Blue Jackets' goaltending coach Manny Legace in Novi, Michigan. Kivlenieks had travelled to Legace's home alongside teammate Elvis Merzļikins, a fellow Latvian goaltender, to celebrate Independence Day and the wedding of Legace's daughter over the holiday weekend. Despite playing hockey in the United States since 2013, it was the first time he stayed in the country long enough in the offseason to experience the Fourth of July. During the memorial service in honor of Kivlenieks on 15 July, Merzļikins revealed that Kivlenieks protected others, including Merzļikins' wife and their unborn child, from the errant fireworks mortar shell that fatally struck him in the chest.

=== Investigation ===
According to Novi Police lieutenant Jason Meier, a set of fireworks were launched off a grassy area that included nine different firework tubes. "After the seventh shot, it tipped and then the eighth shot went over the hot tub and that's when people started to scramble and it was the last shot that hit Mr. Kivlenieks," he said. Kivlenieks was taken to Ascension Providence Hospital with extensive internal injuries, where he was later pronounced dead.

An autopsy performed on 5 July ruled Kivlenieks's death as accidental, due to a percussive injury caused by fireworks mortar blast, resulting in a major chest trauma to his heart and lungs. Prior to the autopsy, police said Kivlenieks was believed to have slipped and hit his head on concrete while running from the malfunctioning firework. According to Novi Police lieutenant Jason Meier, the autopsy showed no signs of head trauma or external injuries to his chest. On 5 July, Meier said that the nine-shot firework was legal in Michigan and the person handling it was not impaired and had not broken state laws. Kivlenieks's death was investigated by police as an accident. On 1 December 2021, the Oakland County prosecutor announced that no charges would be filed in Kivlenieks's death and that the investigation was officially closed.

=== Reactions ===
In a statement, Blue Jackets president of hockey operations John Davidson said Kivlenieks "was an outstanding young man who greeted everyone everyday with a smile and the impact he had during his four years with our organization will not be forgotten". Former Blue Jackets captain Nick Foligno said Kivlenieks "didn't take one day for granted, which makes this tragedy even more hard to bear".

The Latvian Ice Hockey Federation said in a statement that Kivlenieks's death was "a great loss not only for Latvian hockey but for the entire Latvian nation". Executives of the Latvia men's national ice hockey team, as well as Merzļikins, helped the Blue Jackets communicate with Kivlenieks's mother and stepfather, neither of whom speak English, in order to plan out arrangements for a memorial service during the COVID-19 pandemic. In late August, Merzļikins named his newborn son Knox Matīss Merzļikins, honouring a commitment he made at Kivlenieks's memorial service.

Blue Jackets and Monsters fans created makeshift memorials to Kivlenieks, placing signs, flowers, sticks, and balloons at the entrance to Nationwide Arena in Columbus and Rocket Mortgage FieldHouse in Cleveland. On 5 July, a moment of silence was held for Kivlenieks before Game 4 of the 2021 Stanley Cup Finals between the Tampa Bay Lightning and Montreal Canadiens at the Bell Centre in Montreal.

Starting in the 2021–22 season, former teammate Pierre-Luc Dubois announced that he was changing his jersey number from 18 to 80 to honor Kivlenieks. Merzļikins changed his number from 30 to 80 with the Latvian national team in 2022, as he had wanted them to retire the number but since they would not, he would play wearing the number in memory of Kivlenieks, stating "I decided that one day his number and my surname will be hanging from the ceiling, and we will be together—in the same shirt."

At the Columbus Blue Jackets' 2021–22 opening game against the Arizona Coyotes on 14 October 2021 at Nationwide Arena, a banner honoring Kivlenieks was unveiled and remained hanging for the rest of the season while Merzlikins wore the number 80 in memoriam. Kivlenieks's mother, stepfather and aunt participated in the pre-game ceremonies while his younger sister dropped the puck during a ceremonial face-off between Blue Jackets captain Boone Jenner and Coyotes alternate captain Andrew Ladd. The Cleveland Monsters also honored Kivlenieks at their 2021–22 opening game on 15 October 2021, against the Syracuse Crunch at Rocket Mortgage FieldHouse. In addition to Kivlenieks's framed jersey being placed in the goal crease during the pre-game ceremonies, Kivlenieks's mother, stepfather and aunt participated in the pre-game ceremonies. Kivlenieks's younger sister once again dropped the puck during the ceremonial face-off.

The Sioux City Musketeers, Kivlenieks's junior team, retired his number 35 at their home game on 22 October 2021.

=== Funeral ===
On 15 July 2021, an hour-long memorial was held in Upper Arlington, Ohio for Kivlenieks. He was in an open white casket with a framed jersey of his next to it. In attendance was former coach John Tortorella and the coach at the time Brad Larsen, and fellow NHL players Nathan Gerbe and Elvis Merzlikins. His family, including his mother, stepfather and sister, all came from Latvia to attend. During the memorial, fellow Latvian NHL goaltender Merzļikins said that "He [Kivlenieks] saved not just many lives, but when it happened I was standing 20–30 feet back of him", and also indicated that "I was hugging my wife. He [Kivlenieks] saved my (unborn) son. He saved my wife and saved me."

== Career statistics ==
=== Regular season and playoffs ===
			Regular season									Playoffs
Season	Team	League	GP	W	L	OTL	MIN	GA	SO	GAA	SV%	GP	W	L	MIN	GA	SO	GAA	SV%
2011–12	Prizma Riga	LHL	1	—	—	—	—	—	—	9.52	—	—	—	—	—	—	—	—	—
2013–14	Edina Lakers	MNJHL	39	—	—	—	—	—	—	3.95	.908	2	—	—	—	—	—	4.59	.911
2014–15	Forest Lake Lakers	MNJHL	33	—	—	—	—	—	—	2.23	.930	4	—	—	—	—	—	1.75	.950
2014–15	Coulee Region Chill	NAHL	1	0	1	0	59	4	0	4.05	.902	—	—	—	—	—	—	—	—
2015–16	Coulee Region Chill	NAHL	29	16	10	1	1,618	65	2	2.41	.925	4	1	3	210	12	0	3.42	.893
2016–17	Sioux City Musketeers	USHL	49	36	7	2	2,991	92	5	1.85	.932	13	8	3	807	28	2	2.08	.925
2017–18	Cleveland Monsters	AHL	43	14	21	4	2,296	123	1	3.21	.891	—	—	—	—	—	—	—	—
2018–19	Cleveland Monsters	AHL	14	4	4	1	711	44	1	3.71	.873	—	—	—	—	—	—	—	—
2018–19	Kalamazoo Wings	ECHL	8	5	3	0	420	19	0	2.71	.923	—	—	—	—	—	—	—	—
2019–20	Cleveland Monsters	AHL	20	9	8	3	1,194	59	1	2.96	.904	—	—	—	—	—	—	—	—
2019–20	Columbus Blue Jackets	NHL	6	1	1	2	285	14	0	2.95	.898	—	—	—	—	—	—	—	—
2020–21	Cleveland Monsters	AHL	8	6	2	0	481	18	0	2.25	.929	—	—	—	—	—	—	—	—
2020–21	Columbus Blue Jackets	NHL	2	1	1	0	124	7	0	3.40	.901	—	—	—	—	—	—	—	—
NHL totals			8	2	2	2	409	21	0	3.09	.899	—	—	—	—	—	—	—	—

=== International ===
Year	Team	Event	GP	W	L	T	MIN	GA	SO	GAA	SV%
2014	Latvia	WJC18-IA	4	2	1	0	203	8	0	2.37	.899
2015	Latvia	WJC-IA	4	2	1	1	241	7	0	1.75	.928
2016	Latvia	WJC-IA	4	4	0	0	245	7	0	1.71	.941
2021	Latvia	WC	4	1	2	0	248	9	1	2.18	.922
Junior totals			12	8	2	0	689	22	0	1.92	.925
Senior totals			4	1	2	0	248	9	1	2.18	.922

== Awards and honours ==
Award	Year	Ref
MNJHL
Second All-Star Team	2015	
USHL
First All-Star Team	2016–17	
Goaltender of the Year	2016–17	
Player of the Year	2016–17	
International
WJC-D1 Best Goaltender	2015, 2016	
WJC-D1 Best GAA (1.71)	2016	
WJC-D1 Best SVS% (.932)	2016	

== See also ==
- List of ice hockey players who died during their playing careers
