= Southern Alberta Mustangs =

Chestermere Mustangs
- City: Chestermere, Alberta, Canada
- League: United States Premier Hockey League
- Conference: Alberta
- Founded: 2019
- Home arena: Chestermere Regional Community Arena
- Colours: Blue, Red, white
- Owner: Lisa May
- General manager: Adam Redman
- Head coach: Adam Redman
- Website: chestermeremustangs.ca

The Chestermere Mustangs are a Junior ice hockey team based in Chestermere, Alberta, Canada. They are members of the Alberta Conference of the United States Premier Hockey League, Premier League. They play their home games at Chestermere Regional Community Association.

== History ==
During the summer of 2023, the Can-Am Junior Hockey League awarded Staveley, Alberta an expansion franchise to begin play during the 2023–24 Can-Am JHL. The team was named the Southern Alberta Mustangs.

Following their initial year, Can-Am JHL appeared to be unstable, and the Mustangs decided to move to the upstart Alberta Elite Junior Hockey League. The league announced several members and even identified expansion for the 2025-26 season. However, by the start of the 2024-25 season it had all become unraveled and the Mustangs became in active. During the summer of 2025, Lisa May purchased the Mustang franchise. On August 1, 2025 the United States Premier Hockey League announced that five Alberta franchises would form the Alberta Division as part of the Premier Conference, including the Mustangs

The off-season was an active time for the Mustangs once more, as Lisa May announced a new arena agreement with the Chestermere Regional ommunity Association. With the new arena the team is re-branded as the Chestermere Mustangs

== Season-by-season record ==
Note: GP = Games played, W = Wins, L = Losses, T = Ties, OTL = Overtime Losses, GF = Goals for, GA = Goals against, Pts = Points

Season	GP	W	L	T	OTL	GF	GA	Pts	Finish	Playoffs
2023–24	28	3	24	1	77	224	7	x	5th of 5, Can_Am JHL	did not qualify for playoffs
2024–25	align=left|Can-Am Junior Hockey League folds									
2025–26	36	17	15	3	2	191	172	39	2nd of 6, Alberta; 45 of 77, USPHL Premier	South Pod Round Robin 1-1; Won Game default (Rockies); Lost Game 0-4 (Bandits); Lost Qualify Game 3-6 (Rockies)
Chestermere Mustangs
2026–27	x	x	x	x	x	xxx	xxx	xx	7xth of 8, Alberta ??th of xx, USPHL Premier	???
