= Northern Maine Pioneers =

- City: Presque Isle, Maine
- League: United States Premier Hockey League (USPHL); National Collegiate Development Conference (NCDC)
- Division: North
- Founded: 2025
- Home arena: The Forum
- Colors: Dark gray and orange
- Owner: Brandon Johnson
- General manager: Greg Heffernan

Franchise history
- 2025: Presque Isle Frontiers
- 2025–present: Northern Maine Pioneers

The Northern Maine Pioneers are a Tier II junior ice hockey team playing in the United States Premier Hockey League's National Collegiate Development Conference. The team plays their home games at The Forum in Presque Isle, Maine. The club was originally founded as the Presque Isle Frontiers.

The team is owned by Brandon Johnson, who also owns another NCDC team, CT Chiefs North.

== History ==
The Presque Isle Frontiers were founded by the USPHL's National Collegiate Development Conference as part of a wave of five teams; the Frontiers are the only one located in the United States, with the other four teams being located in Canada. The team was initially owned by the Chris and Rhea Reaves, who also own the Woodstock Slammers in Woodstock, New Brunswick, another team that joined the NCDC as part of this wave of expansion.

The team's inaugural head coach was Slovak national Erik Čaládi, who had a long playing career in Europe. Sam Shaheen was the team's general manager. However, the team encountered problems very soon after launch. The Frontiers had trouble filling out its roster and ended up forfeiting what was supposed to be their inaugural game. The league responded immediately by revoking the franchise license from the Reaves'. In short order, Brandon Johnson, who also owns the CT Chiefs North, agreed to purchase the franchise. The club was rebranded as the Northern Maine Pioneers, and Johnson planned to have them on the ice by September 30 or October 1. Čaládi ultimately did not join the team after visa issues delayed his arrival from Slovakia, and Shaheen was replaced as general manager by Greg Heffernan.

== Season-by-season records ==
Season	GP	W	L	OTL	SOL	Pts	GF	GA	Regular season finish	Playoffs
NCDC
Northern Maine Pioneers
2025–26	58	18	37	1	2	39	137	218	5th of 7, N. England North; 28th of 33, NCDC	Did not qualify

== Former logos ==
Presque Isle Frontiers
