= CT Chiefs North =

- City: Biddeford, Maine
- League: United States Premier Hockey League; National Collegiate Development Conference (NCDC)
- Conference: New England
- Division: North
- Founded: 2025
- Home arena: Biddeford Ice Arena
- Colors: Black, red and gold
- Owner: Brandon Johnson

Franchise history
- 2025: Eastern Charlotte Kingfishers
- 2025–Present: CT Chiefs North

The CT Chiefs North are a Tier II junior ice hockey team playing in the United States Premier Hockey League's (USPHL) National Collegiate Development Conference (NCDC) in the North Division. The Chiefs play their home games at the Biddeford Ice Arena in Biddeford, Maine.

The team was founded in 2025 by Ted Colley, and originally planned to play in Blacks Harbour, New Brunswick as the Eastern Charlotte Kingfishers. Before ever playing a game, Colley sold the team and it was relocated to Biddeford to become CT Chiefs North.

The Connecticut Chiefs organization is based out of Newington, Connecticut and is owned by Brandon Johnson. Johnson also owns Northern Maine Pioneers, another team in the NCDC.

== History ==
In May 2025, the USPHL announced the addition of five new franchises, four from Canada. Two of the new franchises, both based in Charlotte County, New Brunswick, were owned by Ted Colley. In June, the names and logos of both teams were revealed with the one from Blacks Harbour, New Brunswick being called the Eastern Charlotte Kingfishers. The team organized an identification camp in cooperation with the other Colley-owned team, the St. Croix Seawolves, held at the Garcelon Civic Center in St. Stephen on the weekend of July 25–27.

In August 2025, before playing a single game, the franchise was acquired by the Newington, Connecticut-based Connecticut Chiefs, who operate a USPHL THF (Tier 1 Hockey Federation) program. As part of the outright purchase, the team was relocated to Biddeford, Maine, where they will remain a member of the NCDC New England Conference's North Division and rebranded as the CT Chiefs North for the 2025–26 season.

Ted Colley's other New Brunswick-based team, the St. Croix Seawolves, would also be sold and rebranded before taking the ice, becoming the St. Stephen County Moose a few weeks after the Chiefs purchased the Kingfishers franchise, though the Moose did not relocate from New Brunswick.

== Season-by-season records ==
Season	GP	W	L	OTL	SOL	Pts	GF	GA	Finish	Playoffs
National Collegiate Development Conference
2025–26	58	20	33	1	4	67	167	221	4th of 7, New England North; 24th of 33, NCDC	Lost Div Semifinal 0-3 (Lewiston)
