= River Falls Renegades =

- City: River Falls, Wisconsin
- Founded: 2007
- Home arena: River Falls Youth Hockey Rink
- Colors: Black and red
- Owners: Crusader Hockey, Inc.
- General manager: Jake Hindermann
- Head coach: Jake Hindermann
- Affiliates: Minnesota Magicians (NAHL)

Franchise history
- 2007–2015: Hudson Crusaders
- 2015–2016: SCV Magicians
- 2016–2017: River Falls Renegades

The River Falls Renegades was a Tier III junior ice hockey team that played first in the Minnesota Junior Hockey League (MnJHL) and then the United States Premier Hockey League (USPHL). The team was not listed among the USPHL membership in 2017–18.

== History ==
Hudson Crusaders

The team was founded in 2007 as part of the Minnesota Junior Hockey League (MnJHL) as the Hudson Crusaders in Hudson, Wisconsin. Their highest achievement was advancing to the 2011 USA Hockey National Tournament where they defeated the Seattle Totems of the Northern Pacific Hockey League becoming the only team to win a game at Nationals with a losing regular season record (the unusual circumstance stemming from the Crusaders winning the bronze medal game, the MnJHL runners-up Rochester Ice Hawks automatically qualified as they were hosting the tournament).

Prior to the 2012–13 season, the team nearly folded one week before the season was to begin when the team president and board of directors resigned. A local group quickly acquired and reorganized the team and staff to save the franchise. In 2013, the new group also acquired the rights to a Tier II North American Hockey League (NAHL) franchise that they relocated to Richfield, Minnesota, and named the Minnesota Magicians. This created a direct link for advancement for their players to develop from Tier III to Tier II junior hockey.

In 2015, the MnJHL was dissolved as many of the former members left to join the United States Premier Hockey League as part of a new Midwest Division. To go along with the change in leagues, the Crusaders also changed their name to the St. Croix Valley (SCV) Magicians to reflect their direct relationship with their higher level NAHL team. During the 2015–16 season, the team relocated from Hudson, Wisconsin, to the Vadnais Sports Center in Vadnais Heights, Minnesota.

Prior to the 2016–17 season, the USPHL Midwest was divided between the USPHL's Elite and USP3 Divisions with the Magicians going to the Elite Division. On July 28, 2016, the Magicians announced that they had relocated once again to become the River Falls Renegades and play out of the River Falls Youth Hockey Rink in River Falls, Wisconsin.

== Season-by-season records ==
Season	GP	W	L	T	OTL	Pts	GF	GA	Regular season finish	Playoffs
Hudson Crusaders
2007–08	48	30	16	1	1	62	207	170	3rd MnJHL	
2008–09	48	13	29	5	1	32	169	253	7th MnJHL	
2009–10	50	15	29	0	6	36	144	208	7th MnJHL	
2010–11	45	19	23	—	3	41	144	175	6th MnJHL	Won Bronze Medal Game; Advanced to USA Hockey Nationals
2011–12	48	24	22	—	2	50	178	171	4th MnJHL	Lost div. semi-final to Twin Cities Northern Lights
2012–13	50	15	33	—	2	32	139	255	8th Minnesota Div.	Lost Division Semifinal
2013–14	46	28	14	—	4	60	176	139	3rd Minnesota Div.	Lost division final
2014–15	42	27	11	—	4	58	243	127	3rd of 8, Minnesota Div. 5th of 14, MnJHL	Won Div. Quarterfinals, 2–0 vs. Maple Grove Energy; Lost div. semi-finals, 0–2 vs. Rochester Ice Hawks
SCV Magicians
2015–16	48	35	11	—	2	72	221	145	4th of 9, Western Conf. 6th of 18, USPHL-Midwest	Lost Conf. Quarterfinals, 1–2 vs. Wisconsin Rapids Riverkings
River Falls Renegades
2016–17	44	15	29	—	0	30	145	178	6th of 8, Midwest Div. 20th of 27, USPHL-Elite	Lost div. quarter-finals, 0–2 vs. Steele County Blades

== Alumni and advancement ==
The Crusaders/Magicians/Renegades produced a few alumni that played in higher levels of junior hockey, NCAA Division I, Division III, and ACHA college programs as well as professional hockey. During the years 2007–2012 they advanced fifty players to a higher level. From 2013 to 2016, players for the Crusaders/Magicians were also called up to their Tier II affiliate, the Minnesota Magicians, since they played their home games about thirty minutes away.
