= St. Stephen County Moose =

- City: St. Stephen, New Brunswick
- League: United States Premier Hockey League; National Collegiate Development Conference (NCDC)
- Conference: New England
- Division: North
- Founded: 2025
- Home arena: Garcelon Civic Center
- Colors: Dark green, cream, and brown

Franchise history
- 2025: St. Croix Seawolves
- 2025–present: St. Stephen County Moose

The St. Stephen County Moose are a Tier II junior ice hockey team playing in the United States Premier Hockey League's (USPHL) National Collegiate Development Conference (NCDC) division. The Moose play their home games at Garcelon Civic Center in St. Stephen, New Brunswick.

Founded in 2025 as the St. Croix Seawolves, the team was sold by founder Ted Colley to new ownership that rebranded the team to the St. Stephen County Moose before ever playing a game as the Seawolves.

== History ==
In 2025, the USPHL announced their sizable foray into Canada with addition of six new franchises from north of the border. Two of the new franchises, both based in Charlotte County, New Brunswick, were owned by Ted Colley. In June, the names and logos of both teams were revealed with the one from St. Stephen, New Brunswick being called the St. Croix Seawolves. The other team, the Eastern Charlotte Kingfishers, was sold to the Connecticut Chiefs and relocated to Biddeford, Maine as CT Chiefs North before ever playing a game.

Shortly after the sale and relocation of the Kingfishers, the Seawolves announced that they had a new "silent" owner and were rebranding as the St. Stephen County Moose. The NCDC said that Colley "could not continue and had no viable options."

== Season-by-season records ==
Season	GP	W	L	OTL	SOL	Pts	GF	GA	Regular season finish	Playoffs
2025–26	53	12	39	2	0	26	118	201	6th of 6, Mountain Div. 21st of 22, NCDC	Did not qualify
