= Alexandria Blizzard =

- City: Alexandria, Minnesota
- League: NA3HL
- Division: West
- Founded: 2012
- Home arena: Runestone Community Center
- Owners: Chris and Mitri Canavati
- Head coach: Jeff Crouse
- Affiliates: St. Cloud Norsemen
- Website: Blizzard website

The Alexandria Blizzard is a USA Hockey-sanctioned Tier III Junior ice hockey team playing in the North American 3 Hockey League (NA3HL). The team plays their home games at Runestone Community Center in Alexandria, Minnesota. The franchise is owned by Chris and Mitri Canavati, the owners of the Tier II North American Hockey League's Brookings Blizzard.

== History ==
Established in 2012, the Blizzard replaced the North American Hockey League team that had recently relocated to Brookings, South Dakota. The owners of the NAHL franchise, Chris and Mitri Canavati, relocated their team due to Alexandria being the smallest market in the Tier II league. However, they still wanted to keep Alexandria as a junior hockey market and founded the Tier III level expansion team as a replacement. The Blizzard announced their first head coach was Jeff Crouse, formerly the assistant coach for the NAHL Blizzard.

== Season-by-season records ==
Season	GP	W	L	OTL	SOL	Pts	GF	GA	PIM	Regular season finish	Playoffs
2012–13	48	31	15	0	2	64	194	111	1304	3rd of 6, West Div. 5th of 17, NA3HL	Lost Div. Semifinals, 1–3 vs. Granite City Lumberjacks
2013–14	48	31	17	0	—	62	228	164	1441	3rd of 6, West Div. 7th of 21, NA3HL	Lost Div. Semifinals, 1–2 vs. Granite City Lumberjacks
2014–15	47	28	16	3	—	59	188	160	1027	3rd of 6, West Div. 14th of 31, NA3HL	Lost Div. Semifinals, 1–2 vs. Granite City Lumberjacks
2015–16	47	22	21	4	—	48	184	166	1139	4th of 5, West Div. 21st of 34, NA3HL	Lost Div. Semifinals, 1–2 vs. Granite City Lumberjacks
2016–17	47	32	12	0	3	67	215	116	1480	2nd of 5, West Div. 13th of 48, NA3HL	Lost Div. Semifinals, 1–2 vs. New Ulm Steel
2017–18	47	31	14	1	1	64	226	151	855	3rd of 5, West Div. 14th of 42, NA3HL	Lost Div. Semifinals, 1–2 vs. New Ulm Steel
2018–19	47	29	17	0	1	59	194	134	986	4th of 7, West Div. 16th of 36, NA3HL	Won Div. Semifinals, 2–1 vs. Lost Div. Finals, 0–2 vs. North Iowa Bulls
2019–20	47	24	18	4	1	53	220	167	884	4th of 6, West Div. 14th of 34, NA3HL	Playoffs cancelled
2020–21	40	17	20	1	2	37	118	157	661	4th of 5, West Div. 18th of 31, NA3HL	Lost Div. Semifinals, 1–2 vs. North Iowa Bulls
2021–22	47	25	20	1	1	52	100	169	661	4th of 6, West Div. 17th of 34, NA3HL	Lost Div. Semifinals, 0–2 vs. Granite City Lumberjacks
2022–23	47	32	12	1	2	67	219	118	1197	2nd of 6, West Div. 9th of 34, NA3HL	Won Div. Semifinals, 2-1 Mason City Toros; Won Div. Finals, 2-0 Granite City Lumberjacks; Fraser Cup - round Robin pool (Won 4-1 Texas Jr. Brahmas & Won 3-1 Granite City Lumberjacks); Won Semifinals, 3–2 Oregon Tradesmen; Lost Championship Gm 5-6 Granite City Lumberjacks
2023–24	47	27	16	3	1	58	176	132	743	3rd of 6, West Div. 16th of 34, NA3HL	Lost Div. Semifinals, 0-2 Rochester Grizzlies
2024–25	47	27	18	2	0	56	174	134	701	2 of 6, West Div. 15th of 35, NA3HL	Lost Div. Semifinals, 0-2 ([Minnesota Moose)
2025–26	47	28	15	3	1	60	189	148	845	3rd of 6, West Div. 14th of 38, NA3HL	Won Div. Semifinals, 2-1 (Minnesota Moose); Lost Div Finals 1-2 (Granite City Lumberjacks)
