= United States Premier Hockey League =

American ice hockey league

- Current season, competition or edition: 2025–26 NCDC season
- Sport: Ice Hockey
- Founded: 2012
- Commissioner: Murry N. Gunty
- Country: United States; Canada
- Most recent champions: Idaho Falls Spud Kings (NCDC); Vernal Oilers (Premier); Northern Cyclones (Elite) (2024)
- Broadcaster: BlackBearTV
- Website: USPHL.com

The United States Premier Hockey League (USPHL) is an American ice hockey league. Founded in 2012, the USPHL has grown to over 60 organizations from across the United States/Canada fielding teams in the National Collegiate Development Conference (NCDC), Premier, Elite, EHF, 18U, 16U, 15U, and High Performance youth divisions.

From 2013 to 2017, USA Hockey sanctioned the Premier, Elite, Empire, Midwest, and USP3 Divisions as Tier III junior leagues. In 2017, the USPHL added a higher level junior league named the National Collegiate Development Conference (NCDC) for the 2017–18 season. The NCDC was seeking free-to-play Tier II junior league sanctioning, but was denied by USA Hockey. In response, the USPHL junior level leagues withdrew from USA Hockey sanctioning altogether. The 18U, 16U and 15U divisions are still considered Tier I youth hockey divisions by USA Hockey.

Beginning in the 2024–25 season, the league plans to expand into Canada's Quebec/Ontario provinces, effectively creating an entire new division.

== History ==
=== Establishment (2013–2017) ===
During the 2012–13 season, several organizations within the Eastern Junior Hockey League (EJHL) decided to form their own league and created the United States Premier Hockey League (USPHL). Those organizations also added their youth programs under the USPHL name as the 18U and 16U divisions. The original Tier III junior teams were categorized in the Premier Division when the USPHL absorbed the Empire Junior Hockey League (becoming the Empire Division) and the newly formed Eastern Elite Hockey League (becoming the Elite Division). With the additions, the USPHL added 16 more organizations to the original 15 before the inaugural 2013–14 season. The formation of the USPHL also led the remaining EJHL teams to join the Atlantic Junior Hockey League and create the Eastern Hockey League (EHL).

For the league's second season in 2014–15, the USPHL added the 16U Futures (16UF) Division for players who aspire to play midget hockey, but are not yet ready for the 16U Division. Eight organizations fielded teams in the 16UF Division for its first season. During the 2014 off-season the USPHL lost the New York Applecore (Empire), but added the Providence Capitals (Elite & 16U), Jersey Shore Whalers (Empire), and the Richmond Generals (Elite, Empire) organizations to increase the total number of organizations to 35 headed into the 2014–15 season.

During the 2014–15 season, the USPHL announce the creation of a Midwest Division to begin in the 2015–16 season by adding several teams from the Minnesota Junior Hockey League (MnJHL). By the end of the season, the Midwest Division would add all but one active MnJHL team causing the MnJHL to disband for the following season. On March 10, 2015, the USPHL also added the entire Midwest Junior Hockey League to its new Midwest Division for the 2015–16 season. USPHL Midwest became the fourth Tier III division under the USPHL umbrella.

The changes for the 2015–16 continued into April when the New York Aviators announced their decision to leave the USPHL and join the North American 3 Eastern Hockey League (NA3EHL). The USPHL promptly reassigned the Aviator franchise to Rye, New York, and was renamed to the New York Dragons. In early April 2015, the Empire Division would expand to Daytona, Florida with the Daytona Racers. Also in April, it was announced the Empire Division would be renamed as the USP3 Division. In late April 2015, the Charlotte Rush was announced as an expansion franchise by adding two teams, one in the Elite Division and one in the USP3. The Wooster Oilers from the former MnJHL decided against fielding two Tier III teams and dropped their membership in the USPHL Midwest and would only play in the North American 3 Hockey League. Initially announced with 22 member teams, the new Midwest Division saw a number of teams cease operations prior to the 2015–16 season including the Indiana Attack, Ironwood Fighting Yoopers, Minnesota Owls, Soo Firehawks, and St. Louis Storm due to lack of players. The Midwest Division did not have its own championship playoffs, but instead the top two teams in each conference from the Midwest and USP3 Divisions played for a single championship.

On January 14, 2016, the league announced the formation of a High Performance Youth Division for the upcoming 2016–17 season. The new division added 14 and under (Bantams), 12 and under (Peewees), along with 10 and under (Squirts) to the USPHL umbrella. Charter members of the High Performance Youth Division were to include the New Jersey Rockets, Hartford Junior Wolfpack, Jersey Hitmen, and P.A.L. Jr. Islanders. In late April, the USPHL announced that the Elite and USP3 Divisions were expanding by splitting the teams from the one-year-old Midwest Division into the Elite and USP3 platforms. More changes came on May 20, 2016, when the USPHL added the four remaining teams from the former Northern Pacific Hockey League to the USP3 as a Pacific Division. Before the start of the season, the loss of the Illiana Blackbirds (Elite), Michigan Wild (USP3), and Marquette Royales (USP3) was offset by the additions of Team Beijing (Elite), another team from the New York Aviators organization (Elite), and the return of the Ironwood Fighting Yoopers (USP3).

=== League realignment (2017–present) ===
In October 2016, the USPHL announced it had applied to USA Hockey for approval to start a Tier II junior league for the 2017–18 season. The proposed Tier II USPHL division was announced to consist of 11 teams, seven from organizations in the USPHL Premier, the newly added Rochester Monarchs, and the Boston Bandits, New Jersey Rockets, and Northern Cyclones from the Eastern Hockey League. At the time, the only USA Hockey-sanctioned Tier II league is the North American Hockey League. However, in December 2016, USA Hockey denied their application for a Tier II league. The USPHL launched its tuition-free league as the National Collegiate Development Conference. In response, the USPHL dropped USA Hockey sanctioning from their junior level leagues and operates unsanctioned beginning with the 2017–18 season.

In December 2016, the USPHL also announced the addition of six organizations from the Eastern Hockey League for the 2017–18 season: the previously mentioned Bandits, Rockets, and Cyclones would be joined by the Connecticut Nighthawks, Hartford Jr. Wolfpack, and New Hampshire Junior Monarchs. The New Hampshire Monarchs previously fielded USPHL teams in the youth levels. While the Bandits, Rockets and Cyclones have free-to-play teams in the new NCDC, all six organizations were announced to have Tier III teams in the Premier Division and five teams in the Elite Division. The Jr. Monarchs would also add a NCDC team in 2018.

The league also announced the retirement of the USP3 Division, with the Premier Division remaining the top pay-to-play division and the Elite Division the only Tier III feeder division. The Jersey Shore Whalers and the Florida Jr. Blades, both members of the former USP3 Division, were granted teams in the Premier Division, as well as the Jr. Blades adding their USP3 team to the Elite Division. The Skipjacks Hockey Club also added a Premier team to augment their teams in the youth divisions. The Wisconsin Muskies also announced they would field an expansion team in the Premier Division. As part of the many changes, three of the four isolated former USP3 Pacific Division teams left the league with only the Eugene Generals remaining. The Generals would have a modified schedule for the season in the Elite Division playing most of their games against local youth and academy teams while only playing other USPHL teams in showcases.

For 2018–19, the league merged with the Eastern Hockey Federation (EHF) youth leagues. The EHF organization already had many of the USPHL's junior organization's youth clubs. The league also rebranded its 16U Futures as 15U. On March 8, 2019, the USPHL and EHF announced plans to integrate the USPHL's High Performance Youth Division into the EHF to create the EHF South Division, expanding the youth league's footprint into the Mid-Atlantic region, beginning with the 2019–20 season.

In 2020, the USPHL Premier added the Anaheim Avalanche, Fresno Monsters, Las Vegas Thunderbirds, Northern Colorado Eagles, Ogden Mustangs, Pueblo Bulls, San Diego Sabers, Southern Oregon Spartans, and the Utah Outliers from the Western States Hockey League, another independent junior hockey organization. Complimentary additions to the USPHL Premier included Elmira Jr. Enforcers (renamed in 2023 to the Elmira Impact), Provo Riverblades, and the return of the Wooster Oilers after a one-year absence.

During the 2019–20 season the Boston Bandits NCDC membership was purchased by the Philadelphia Hockey Club, to replace the Bandits in 2020–21. Rochester Monarchs were removed and replaced by Boston Advantage for the 2020–21 season.

For the 2022–23 season, several new teams joined the USPHL. The Mercer Chiefs joined the NCDC. The Bakersfield Roughnecks joined the Pacific Division in the USPHL Premier. The Idaho Falls Spud Kings joined the Mountain Division in the USPHL Premier. The Minnesota Squatch joined the Midwest West Division in the USPHL Premier. Finally, several former teams from the WSHL—the Bellingham Blazers, Rock Springs Prospectors, Rogue Valley Royals, Seattle Totems, and Vernal Oilers—created a new North West Division in the USPHL Premier.

== Member teams ==
=== National Collegiate Development Conference ===

Conference	Division	Team	Location	Arena	Joined
Atlantic	N/A	Connecticut Jr. Rangers	Stamford, Connecticut	Chelsea Piers Connecticut	2017
Atlantic	N/A	Jersey Hitmen	Wayne, New Jersey	Ice Vault Arena	2017
Atlantic	N/A	Mercer Chiefs	Hamilton, New Jersey	Ice Land Skating Center	2022
Atlantic	N/A	P.A.L. Jr. Islanders	Hauppauge, New York	Northwell Health Ice Center	2017
Atlantic	N/A	Rockets Hockey Club	Bridgewater, New Jersey	Bridgewater Sports Arena	2017
Atlantic	N/A	West Chester Wolves	West Chester, Pennsylvania	PNY Sports Arena	2024
Atlantic	N/A	Wilkes-Barre/Scranton Knights	Pittston, Pennsylvania	Revolution Ice Center	2022
Colonial	N/A	CT Chiefs North	Newington, Connecticut	Newington Arena	2025
Colonial	N/A	Connecticut RoughRiders	Norwalk, Connecticut	SoNo Icehouse	2013
Colonial	N/A	NY Dynamo	Clifton Park, New York	Capital Ice Arena	2024
Colonial	N/A	Red Bank Generals	Red Bank, New Jersey	Red Bank Armory	2024
Colonial	N/A	Springfield Pics	West Springfield, Massachusetts	Olympia Ice Center	2025
Colonial	N/A	Syracuse Lightning	Baldwinsville, New York	Three Rivers Athletic Complex	2022
Colonial	N/A	Utica Jr. Comets	Utica, New York	Adirondack Bank Center	2017
Colonial	N/A	Universal Academy	Jay, Vermont	Jay Peak Arena	2024
Metropolitan	N/A	Boston Dogs	Canton, Massachusetts	Canton Ice Center	2024
Metropolitan	N/A	Boston Jr. Rangers	Tewksbury, Massachusetts	Breakaway Ice Center	2024
Metropolitan	N/A	Boston Junior Bruins	Marlborough, Massachusetts	New England Sports Center	2025^{a}
Metropolitan	N/A	Islanders Hockey Club	Tyngsborough, Massachusetts	Skate 3 Ice Arena	2017
Metropolitan	N/A	New England Wolves	Laconia, New Hampshire	Merrill Fay Arena	2005
Metropolitan	N/A	Northern Cyclones	Hudson, New Hampshire	Cyclones Arena	2017
Metropolitan	N/A	South Shore Kings	Foxboro, Massachusetts	Foxboro Sports Center	2017
Metropolitan	N/A	Worcester Jr. Railers	Worcester, Massachusetts	Fidelity Bank Worcester Ice Center	2024
Midwest	Great Lakes	Chicago Union	Lockport, Illinois	Summit Ice Center	2026
Midwest	Great Lakes	Columbus Mavericks	Lewis Center, Ohio	OhioHealth Chiller North	2019
Midwest	Great Lakes	Fort Wayne Spacemen	Fort Wayne, Indiana	SportONE/Parkview Icehouse	2019
Midwest	Great Lakes	Metro Jets	Mount Clemens, Michigan	Mount Clemens Ice Arena	2018
Midwest	Great Lakes	Red River Spartans	Clarksville, Tennessee	F&M Bank Arena	2022 ^{†}
Midwest	Great Lakes	Toledo Cherokee	Toledo, Ohio	Team Toledo Ice House	2018
Midwest	North	Hudson Havoc	Hudson, Wisconsin	Hudson Sports & Civic Center	2017
Midwest	North	Minnesota Blue Ox	Coon Rapids, Minnesota	Coon Rapids Ice Center	2017
Midwest	North	Minnesota Squatch	Elk River, Minnesota	Furniture-and-Things Community Event Center	2022
Midwest	North	Northwest Express	Spooner, Wisconsin	Spooner Civic Center	2017 ^{†}
Midwest	North	Wisconsin Rapids RiverKings	Wisconsin Rapids, Wisconsin	South Wood County Rec Center	2017
Northeast	N/A				
Northeast	N/A	Lewiston MAINEiacs	Lewiston, Maine	The Colisée	2025
Northeast	N/A	Montreal Black Vees	Montreal, Quebec	Centre Sportif et Culturel du Collége St-Jean Vianney	2024
Northeast	N/A	Northern Maine Pioneers	Presque Isle, Maine	The Forum	2025
Northeast	N/A	Perth-Andover Bearcats	Perth-Andover, New Brunswick	River Valley Civic Centre	2026 ^{†}
Northeast	N/A	St. Stephen County Moose	St. Stephen, New Brunswick	Garcelon Civic Centre	2025
Northeast	N/A	Universel Quebec	Quebec City, Quebec	Seminaire Saint-Francois	2025
Northeast	N/A	Thunder Hockey Club	Exeter, New Hampshire	The Rinks At Exeter	2019
Northeast	N/A	Woodstock Slammers	Woodstock, New Brunswick	AYR Motor Centre	2025
South	Florida	Coral Springs Jr. Cats	Coral Springs, Florida	IceDen	2023
South	Florida	Florida Eels	Fort Myers, Florida	Fort Myers Skatium	2017
South	Florida	Florida Jr. Blades	Estero, Florida	Hertz Arena	2017
South	Florida	Florida Surge	Jacksonville, Florida	Community First Igloo	2023
South	Florida	Tampa Bay Juniors	Ellenton, Florida	Ellenton Ice	2017
South	Florida	Typhoon Hockey Club	Palm Beach, Florida	Palm Beach Skate Zone	2021
South	Southeast	Carolina Jr. Hurricanes	Morrisville, North Carolina	Wake Competition Center	2017 ^{†}
South	Southeast	Charleston Colonials	North Charleston, South Carolina	Carolina Ice Palace	2019 (Note: Charleston was dormant from 2021 through 2025.)
South	Southeast	Charlotte Rush	Indian Trail, North Carolina	Extreme Ice Center	2017
South	Southeast	Hampton Roads Whalers	Chesapeake, Virginia	Chilled Ponds Ice Sports Complex	2017
South	Southeast	Potomac Patriots	Woodbridge, Virginia	Prince William Ice Center	2017
South	Southeast	Yorktown Admirals	Yorktown, Virginia	Chilled Ponds Yorktown	2026
West	Mountain	Casper Warbirds	Casper, Wyoming	Casper Ice Arena	2023
West	Mountain	McCall Smokejumpers	McCall, Idaho	Manchester Ice & Event Centre	2026
West	Mountain	Park City Outliers	Heber City, Utah	Black Rock Ice Arena	2023
West	Mountain	Rock Springs Miners	Rock Springs, Wyoming	Rock Springs Ice Arena	2023
West	Mountain	Vernal Oilers	Vernal, Utah	Western Park Ice Rink	2022
West	Pacific	Fresno Monsters	Fresno, California	Gateway Ice Center	2020
West	Pacific	Lake Tahoe Lakers	South Lake Tahoe, California	South Lake Tahoe Ice Arena	2021
West	Pacific	Ontario Jr. Reign	Ontario, California	Ontario Ice Skating Center	2021
West	Pacific	Ventura Vikings	Simi Valley, California	Iceoplex Simi Valley	2022

a – The Boston Junior Bruins previously played at the NCDC level before selling that franchise to the West Chester Wolves in 2024 and then promoting their Premier division club the following year.
b – Universel Academy is based out of Sherbrooke but the NCDC team will play their home games at Jay Peak Resort in Jay, Vermont.

==== NCDC timeline ====
Active Inactive Future

=== Premier ===

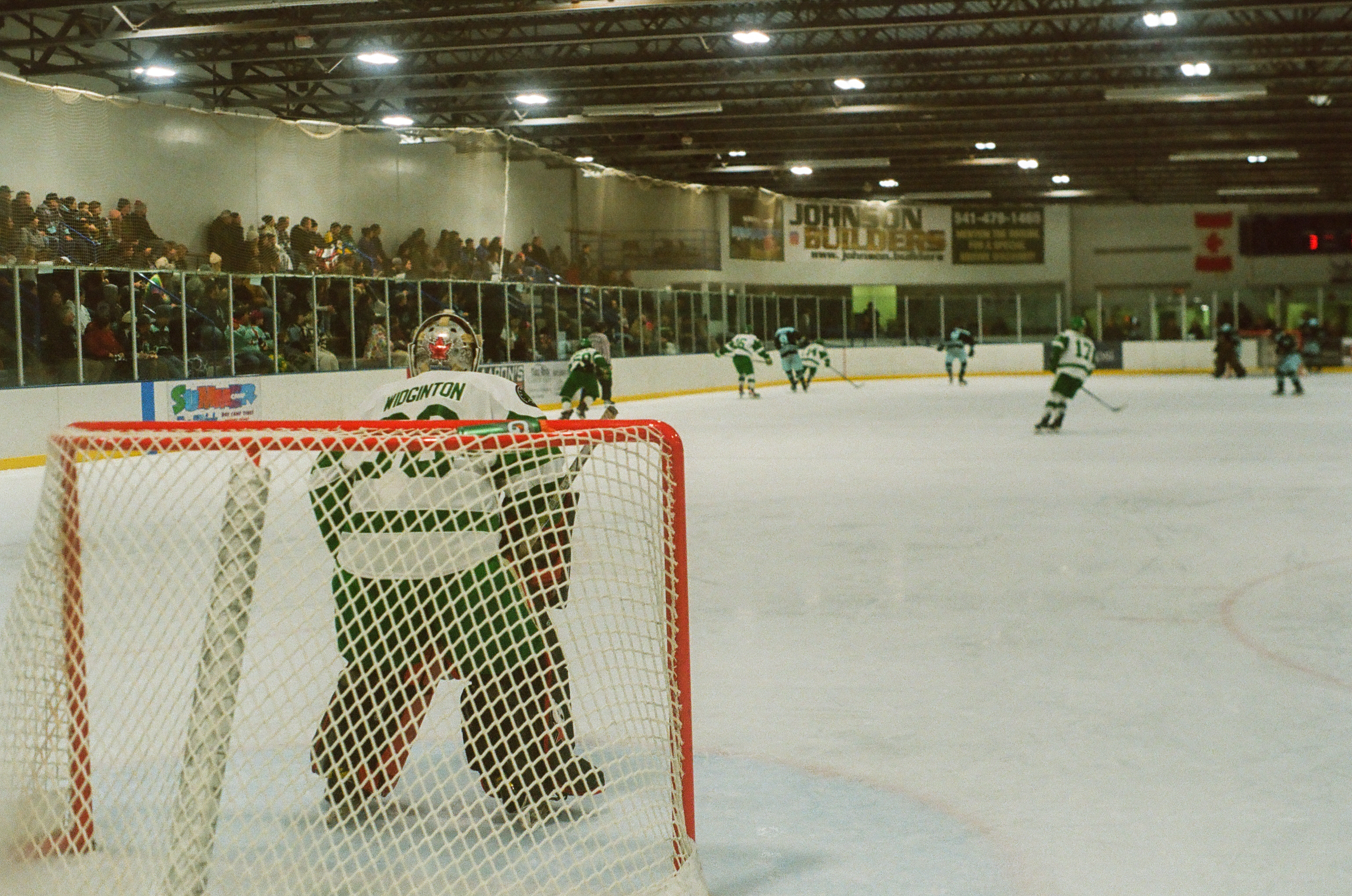
Seattle Totems playing against the Rogue Valley Royals in Medford, OR in January 2024

Division	Team	Location	Arena	Joined
Alberta	Bassano Beavers	Bassano, Alberta	Bassano Arena	2025
Alberta	Calgary Bandits	Calgary, Alberta	TBA	2025
Alberta	Chestermere Mustangs	Chestermere, Alberta	Chestermere Recreation Centre	2025
Alberta	Claresholm Cowboys	Claresholm, Alberta	Claresholm Arena	2025
Alberta	Hanna Havoc	Hanna, Alberta	Hanna Agri-Sports Complex	2025
Alberta	Hinton Timberwolves	Hinton, Alberta	Dr. Duncan Murray Recreation Centre	2026
Alberta	OLCN Scouts	Onion Lake, Alberta	Onion Lake Memorial Communiplex	2025
Alberta	Three Hills Titans	Three Hills, Alberta	Centennial Place Arena	2025
Atlantic	Connecticut Jr. Rangers Elite	Stamford, Connecticut	Chelsea Piers Connecticut	2013
Atlantic	Connecticut Jr. Rangers	Stamford, Connecticut	Chelsea Piers Connecticut	2013
Atlantic	Jersey Hitmen	Wayne, New Jersey	Ice Vault Arena	2017
Atlantic	Mercer Chiefs	Hamilton, New Jersey	Ice Land Skating Center	2022
Atlantic	New Jersey Renegades	Randolph, New Jersey	SportsCare Arena	2025
Atlantic	P.A.L. Jr. Islanders	Hauppauge, New York	Northwell Health Ice Center	2017 (Note: P.A.L. was a founding member of the Premier division in 2013, however, their primary franchise was promoted to the NCDC upon its creation in 2017. This franchise originally began in the Elite Division in 2013 and was promoted to the Premier Division in 2017. The team was also dormant during the 2018–19 season.)
Atlantic	Red Bank Generals	Red Bank, New Jersey	Red Bank Armory	2024
Atlantic	Rockets Hockey Club	Bridgewater, New Jersey	Bridgewater Sports Arena	2017
Atlantic	West Chester Wolves	West Chester, Pennsylvania	PNY Sports Arena	2024
Atlantic	Wilkes-Barre/Scranton Knights	Pittston, Pennsylvania	Revolution Ice Center	2021
Florida	Coral Springs Jr. Cats	Coral Springs, Florida	IceDen	2023
Florida	Florida Eels	Fort Myers, Florida	Fort Myers Skatium	2017
Florida	Florida Jr. Blades	Estero, Florida	Hertz Arena	2017
Florida	Florida Surge	Jacksonville, Florida	Community First Igloo	2023
Florida	Tampa Bay Juniors	Ellenton, Florida	Ellenton Ice	2017
Florida	Typhoon Hockey Club	Palm Beach, Florida	Palm Beach Skate Zone	2021
Great Lakes	Chicago Cougars	Chicago, Illinois	Summit Ice Center	2017
Great Lakes	Columbus Mavericks	Lewis Center, Ohio	OhioHealth Chiller North	2019
Great Lakes	Fort Wayne Spacemen	Fort Wayne, Indiana	SportONE/Parkview Icehouse	2019
Great Lakes	Metro Jets	Mount Clemens, Michigan	Mount Clemens Ice Arena	2018
Great Lakes	Red River Spartans	Clarksville, Tennessee	F&M Bank Arena	2022 ^{†}
Great Lakes	Toledo Cherokee	Toledo, Ohio	Team Toledo Ice House	2018
Midwest	Cincinnati Jr. Cyclones	Evendale, Ohio	Queen City Sportsplex	2021
Midwest	Danville Iron	Danville, Illinois	David S. Palmer Arena	2026 ^{†}
Midwest	Flint Icelanders	Flint, Michigan	810 Sports Complex	2022 ^{†}
Midwest	Fresh Coast Freeze	Holland, Michigan	Griff's Icehouse West	2021 ^{†}
Midwest	Metro Jets Development Program	Mount Clemens, Michigan	Mount Clemens Ice Arena	2018
New England	Boston Jr. Rangers	Tewksbury, Massachusetts	Breakaway Ice Center	2024
New England	Boston Jr. Terriers	Canton, Massachusetts	Canton Sportsplex	2024
New England	Buffalo Steel	Buffalo, New York	PNY North Sports Arena	2024
New England	Islander Beacons		PNY North Sports Arena	2026
New England	Islanders Hockey Club	Tyngsborough, Massachusetts	Skate 3 Arena	2013
New England	New England Wolves	Laconia, New Hampshire	Merrill Fay Arena	1998
New England	Northern Cyclones	Hudson, New Hampshire	Cyclones Arena	2013
New England	Northern Cyclones Academy	Hudson, New Hampshire	Cyclones Arena	2026
New England	South Shore Kings	Foxboro, Massachusetts	Foxboro Sports Center	2013
New England	Springfield Pics	West Springfield, Massachusetts	Olympia Ice Center	2014
New England	Syracuse Lightning	Baldwinsville, New York	Three Rivers Athletic Complex	2022 (Note: Twin City withdrew from the league for the 2023–24 season.)
New England	Utica Jr. Comets	Utica, New York	Adirondack Bank Center	2015
New England	Worcester Jr. Railers	Worcester, Massachusetts	Fidelity Bank Worcester Ice Center	2024
North	Dells Ducks	Lake Delton, Wisconsin	Poppy Waterman Ice Arena	2017
North	Hudson Havoc	Hudson, Wisconsin	Hudson Sports & Civic Center	2017
North	Kinni Spirit	River Falls, Wisconsin	River Falls Youth Hockey Rink	2026
North	Minnesota Mullets	Forest Lake, Minnesota	Augsburg University Ice Arena	2017
North	Northwest Express	Spooner, Wisconsin	Spooner Civic Center	2017 ^{†}
Pacific	Bremerton Sockeyes	Bremerton, Washington	Bremerton Ice Center	2024
Pacific	Iron County Yeti	Enoch, Utah	KJ's Ice Barn	2023 ^{†}
Pacific	Long Beach Bombers	Lakewood, California	Lakewood Ice	2021 ^{†}
Pacific	Rogue Valley Royals	Medford, Oregon	The RRRink	2022
Pacific	Salt Lake Ghost Riders	West Valley City, Utah	Acord Ice Center	2026
Pacific	San Diego Sabers	Escondido, California	Iceoplex Escondido	2020
Pacific	Santa Clarita Lakers	Santa Clarita, California	The Cube Ice and Entertainment Center	2026
Southeast	Carolina Jr. Hurricanes	Morrisville, North Carolina	Wake Competition Center	2017 ^{†}
Southeast	Charleston Colonials	North Charleston, South Carolina	Carolina Ice Palace	2019 (Note: Charleston was dormant from 2021 through 2025.)
Southeast	Charlotte Rush	Indian Trail, North Carolina	Extreme Ice Center	2017
Southeast	Hampton Roads Whalers	Chesapeake, Virginia	Chilled Ponds Ice Sports Complex	2017
Southeast	Potomac Patriots	Woodbridge, Virginia	Prince William Ice Center	2017
Southeast	Yorktown Admirals	Yorktown, Virginia	Chilled Ponds	2026
St. Lawrence	Collège Universel Gatineau	Gatineau, Quebec	Meredith Centre	2023
St. Lawrence	Collège Universel Quebec	Quebec City, Quebec	-	2026
St. Lawrence	Hawkesbury Knights	Hawkesbury, Ontario	Robert Hartley Sports Complex	2024
St. Lawrence	Kingston Wranglers	Kingston, Ontario	INVISTA Centre	2024
St. Lawrence	Montreal Black Vees	Montreal, Quebec	Centre Sportif et Culturel du Collége St-Jean Vianney	2024
St. Lawrence	NY Dynamo	Plattsburgh, New York	Ameri-Can North Sports Center	2025
St. Lawrence	Ottawa Valley Centennia	Almonte, Ontario	John Levi Community Centre	2025
St. Lawrence	Ravens Hockey Academy	Deux-Montagnes, Quebec	Aréna Olympia	2026
St. Lawrence	St-Lazare Avalanche	Saint-Lazare, Quebec	Quartier des Sports Kubota	2025
St. Lawrence	Somang Hockey	Terrebonne, Quebec	Aréna de Lachenaie	2024
St. Lawrence	Universel Sherbrooke	Sherbrooke, Quebec	Aréna de Bromont	2024

† relocated

==== Premier timeline ====
Through 2021

Since 2021

Active Promoted Inactive Future

=== Elite and lower teams ===
The USPHL consists of Elite junior levels, as well as EHF Selects, EHF South, 18U, 16U, 15U, and High Performance youth divisions with organizations located across the United States and Canada.

Team	Location	NCDC affiliate
Atlanta Mad Hatters	Marietta, Georgia	—
Bearcat Hockey Club	Fraser, Michigan	South Shore Kings
Bold City Battalion	Jacksonville, Florida	—
Carolina Jr. Hurricanes	Morrisville, North Carolina	—
Charleston Colonial	Charleston, South Carolina	—
Charlotte Rush	Pineville, North Carolina	Northern Cyclones
Chicago Cougars	Bensenville, Illinois	—
Chicago Crush	Addison, Illinois	—
Chicago T-Rex	Decatur, Illinois	—
Connecticut Jr. Rangers	Stamford, Connecticut	Connecticut Jr. Rangers
Coral Springs Jr. Cats	Coral Springs, Florida	—
Elmira Impact	Elmira, New York	—
Evansville Mariners	Evansville, Indiana	—
Florida Eels	Fort Myers, Florida	Islanders Hockey Club
Florida Jr. Blades	Estero, Florida	P.A.L. Jr. Islanders
Fort Wayne Spacemen	Fort Wayne, Indiana	—
Hampton Roads Whalers	Yorktown, Virginia	New Jersey Rockets
Hershey Cubs	Hershey, Pennsylvania	—
Islanders Hockey Club	North Andover, Massachusetts	Islanders Hockey Club
Jersey Hitmen	Wayne, New Jersey	Jersey Hitmen
Metro Jets	Mount Clemens, Michigan	Boston Junior Bruins
Northern Cyclones	Hudson, New Hampshire	Northern Cyclones
Palm Beach Typhoon	Palm Beach, Florida	—
P.A.L. Jr. Islanders	Hauppauge, New York	P.A.L. Jr. Islanders
Potomac Patriots	Woodbridge, Virginia	Utica Jr. Comets
Red Bank Generals	Red Bank, New Jersey	Muskegon Lumberjacks (USHL)
Rockets Hockey Club	Bridgewater, New Jersey	Rockets Hockey Club
South Shore Kings	Foxboro, Massachusetts	South Shore Kings
Springfield Pics	West Springfield, Massachusetts	Northern Cyclones
Tampa Bay Juniors	Wesley Chapel, Florida	South Shore Kings
Wilkes-Barre/Scranton Knights	Pittston, Pennsylvania	Wilkes-Barre/Scranton Knights

== Champions ==
Year	Premier Division	Elite Division	USP3 (Note: Formerly called Empire Division from 2013 to 2015)	18U Division	16U Division	16U Futures Division
2013–14	Boston Jr. Bruins	Springfield Jr. Pics	Florida Jr. Blades	Selects Academy	Selects Academy	—
2014–15	Jersey Hitmen	Boston Jr. Bruins	New York Aviators	Jersey Hitmen	Wilkes-Barre/Scranton Knights	Carolina Eagles
2015–16	Jersey Hitmen	Hampton Roads Whalers	Dells Ducks (Note: 2016 Championship series was held between the new Midwest Division and the USP3 Division for a single champion won by the Midwest's Dells Ducks)	Selects Academy	Selects Academy	Potomac Patriots
2016–17	Islanders Hockey Club	Charlotte Rush	Florida Jr. Blades	P.A.L. Jr. Islanders	Selects Academy	Jersey Hitmen
Year	NCDC	Premier Division	Elite Division	18U Division	16U Division	15U (Note: Also known as 16U Futures Division prior to the 2018–19 season.)
2017–18	Islanders Hockey Club	Hampton Roads Whalers	Hampton Roads Whalers	Selects Academy	Selects Academy	Jersey Hitmen
2018–19	Boston Junior Bruins	Hampton Roads Whalers	Richmond Generals	Selects Academy	Islanders Hockey Club (Note: Won the 16U Springfield Championship.); Pittsburgh Vengeance (Note: Won the 16U Bridgewater Championship.)	Philadelphia Hockey Club
2019–20	Not awarded due to the COVID-19 pandemic			Jersey Hitmen	Rockets Hockey Club (Note: Won the 16U National Championship.); Springfield Pics (Note: Won the 16U American Championship.)	Palmyra Black Knights
2020–21	Jersey Hitmen	Charlotte Rush	Charlotte Rush	Boston Junior Bruins (Note: Won the 18U National Championship.); Maine Moose (Note: Won the 18U American Championship.)	Islanders Hockey Club; Springfield Pics	Jersey Hitmen
2021–22	Jersey Hitmen	Rockets Hockey Club	Richmond Generals	Skipjacks Hockey Club; Connecticut Jr. Rangers	P.A.L. Jr. Islanders; Rockets Hockey Club	P.A.L. Jr. Islanders
2022–23	P.A.L. Jr. Islanders	Northern Cyclones	Carolina Jr. Hurricanes			
2023–24	South Shore Kings	Connecticut Jr. Rangers	Northern Cyclones			
2024–25	Idaho Falls Spud Kings	Vernal Oilers	Carolina Jr. Hurricanes			
2025–26	South Shore Kings	Vernal Oilers	Carolina Jr. Hurricanes			

== Former teams ==
- Adirondack Jr. Wings (2013–15, Empire/16U/16U Futures Divisions) Team ceased operations prior to 2015–16 season; also fielded youth teams for one more season.
- Alpena Flyers (2014–17, Midwest/USP3 Divisions) Team ceased operations following the end of the 2016–17 season.
- Anaheim Avalanche (2020–21, Premier Division) Joined from the Western States Hockey League (WSHL) as the Ontario Avalanche in 2020 and relocated to Anaheim before their first USPHL season; purchased and relocated as the Long Beach Shredders for the 2021–22 season.
- Atlanta Kings (2018–19) Former Junior Knights organization. Ceased operations after the one 2018–19 season it played in Marietta, Georgia, and replaced by a new organization called the Atlanta Mad Hatters.
- Atlanta Junior Knights (2013–18) Joined from the Eastern Elite Hockey League. Moved to a new rink in Marietta, Georgia, and rebranded as the Atlanta Kings.
- Bay State Breakers (2013–15, Premier Division) Premier franchise sold to the Syracuse Stars organization; continues to field their Elite Division and youth teams for one more season.
- Beijing Shougang Eagles (2017–2019; Elite Division) Chinese junior team that played out of East Meadow, New York
- Billings Cattle Punchers announced as a 2026 expansion team but moved to NAHL before season started.
- Blaine Energy (2015–17, Midwest/Elite Divisions) Formerly in the Minnesota Junior Hockey League as the Maple Grove Energy; ceased operations at the end of the 2016–17 season.
- Boston Advantage (2020–2023, NCDC/Premier) Added junior teams in the Tier II NCDC and Tier III Premier in 2020; removed from the league following the 2022–23 season in which the organization had become non-compliant with league rules.
- Boston Bandits (2017–2020, NCDC) Joined from the Eastern Hockey League in 2017 when the NCDC was created; sold its NCDC franchise to the Philadelphia Hockey Club before the 2020–21 season. All other teams were renamed Bridgewater Bandits.
- Brewster Bulldogs (2013–15, Empire Division) Formerly in the Empire Junior Hockey League; continued to field their EHL 19U Elite team that was formerly in Metropolitan Junior Hockey League until 2016.
- Buffalo Thunder (2018–2021, Premier Division) Played as the Niagara Falls Thunder in the 2018–19 season before becoming the Buffalo Thunder in 2019; replaced by the Buffalo Stampede expansion team in 2021.
- Charleston Colonials (2019–2021, Premier/Elite)
- Columbia Infantry (Premier, Elite) announced August 24 they would not participate 2024–25.
- Connecticut Nighthawks (2017–2020, Premier) Joined form the Eastern Hockey League; did not return after the COVID-19 hiatus.
- Detroit Fighting Irish (2015–2022, Midwest/USP3/Premier) Joined from the Midwest Junior Hockey League; not in listed for the 2022–23 season.
- Daytona Racers (2015–18) Operated by the DME Academy, the Racers initially joined the USP3 Division; the Academy dropped the Racers name from its hockey team in the Premier Division in 2018 and were not in the league for 2019–20.
- Decatur Blaze (2015–2025 Premier)(2024–25 added Elite) prior to USPHL was Midwest Junior Hockey League (2012–15). Purchased and re-branded as the Chicago T-Rex for the 2025–26 season for both the Premier and Elite teams.
- Elmira Impact ||Premier (2020–2026) folded after 26 games into the 2025–26 season.
- Eugene Generals (2016–18, USP3/Elite Divisions) Joined the USP3 Division from the Northern Pacific Hockey League in 2016; only Pacific team remaining in the Elite Division in 2017–18 season leading the team to mostly playing an independent schedule while also retaining its USA Hockey-sanctioning when the USPHL went independent; left the league the following season.
- Florida Bulldogs (2013–15, Elite Division) Formerly called the Space Coast Jr. Hurricanes when the organization joined from the Eastern Elite Hockey League and for the 2013–14 USPHL season; merged with the Roswell Bulldogs organization in April 2014 and played under that name for the 2014–15 season; renamed Florida Bulldogs prior to the 2015–16 season but ceased operation due to lack of players after one game, an 8–2 loss to the Palm Beach Hawks.
- Forest Lake Lakers (2015–17, Midwest/Elite Divisions) Formerly in the Minnesota Junior Hockey League; team sold and renamed Minnesota Mullets after the 2016–17 season.
- Frederick Freeze (2013–16, Empire/USP3 Division) Formerly in the Empire Junior Hockey League, removed from USP3 schedule in September 2016.
- Grand Junction River Hawks 2025–26 season – then moved to NAHL along with 4 other division teams,
- Hartford Jr. Wolfpack (2017–2019; Premier Division) Joined from the Eastern Hockey League in 2017; removed from the schedule at the beginning of the 2019–20 season.
- Idaho Falls Spud Kings 2023–26 season – then moved to NAHL along with 4 other division teams
- Illiana Blackbirds (2015–16, Midwest Division) Based out of Dyer, Indiana; joined from the Minnesota Junior Hockey League in 2015; merged into the Elite Division for 2016–17 but ceased operations prior to scheduling. Relisted as a team in the Premier Division for 2018–19 as the Midwest Blackbirds.
- Indiana Attack Announced team for 2015–16 season in the Midwest Division; formerly the Fort Wayne Federals of the Minnesota Junior Hockey League; canceled their opening night game against the Alpena Flyers one day before it was scheduled and ceased operations.
- Ironwood Fighting Yoopers (2016–18) Announced team for 2015–16 season in the Midwest Division; formerly in the Minnesota Junior Hockey League; took leave of absence prior to first season. The team returned as part of the USP3 in 2016–17, then the Premier Midwest in 2017–18. Sold franchise prior to 2018–19 season and became the Rum River Mallards.
- Jersey Wildcats (2013–15, Empire Division) Formerly in the Empire Junior Hockey League; continued to field a team in the North American 3 Atlantic Hockey League (formerly called the Metropolitan Junior Hockey League) from 2015 to 2017.
- Jersey Shore Whalers (2014–19 Empire/USP3/Premier Divisions) Joined the USPHL after several seasons as a youth organization; junior team removed from Premier schedule during the 2019–20 season. Returned for 2021–22 season. Not on league listing 2022–23 season.
- Kalkaska Rhinos (2015–18 Midwest/USP3/Premier Divisions) Joined the new Midwest Division in 2015 as an expansion team after playing a partial season in the Canadian International Hockey League in 2014–15. Moved to the USP3 Division in 2016–17 and the Premier Division in 2017–18. Cancelled all remaining games in January 2018 due to injuries and lack of players.
- Lake Erie Bighorns (2019–2022, Great Lakes Division)
- Lansing Wolves (2018–20, Premier Division) Formerly in the NA3HL, not listed as a member of the USPHL prior to the 2020–21 season.
- Marquette Royales (2015–16, Midwest Division) Formerly in the Minnesota Junior Hockey League, moved to the USP3 Division in 2016 but was removed from the schedule prior to the 2016–17 season.
- Michigan Wild (2015–16, Midwest Division) Joined from the Midwest Junior Hockey League as the Michigan Ice Dogs but were renamed the Wild prior to their first season in the USPHL; joined the USP3 Division in 2016 but were removed from the schedule less than one week before the start of the season.
- Midwest Blackbirds (2018–2022, Premier)
- Minnesota Owls Announced team for 2015–16 season in the Midwest Division; formerly in the Minnesota Junior Hockey League; took leave of absence prior to first season.
- Motor City Hawks (2015–18, Midwest/USP3/Premier Division) Joined from the Midwest Junior Hockey League in 2015 and played in the Midwest Division. Joined the USP3 Division in 2016–17 and then the Premier Division in 2017–18. At the end of the 2017–18 season, the team re-branded to the Motor City Hockey Club and relocated to Troy, Michigan.
- New Hampshire Junior Monarchs (2017–2023, NCDC/Premier) Joined the USPHL from the Eastern Hockey League upon the formation of the NCDC in 2017; arena was purchased by an ownership group that displaced the Jr. Monarchs with a new organization that join the North American Hockey League.
- New York Apple Core (2013–14, Empire Division) Formerly in the Empire Junior Hockey League; continues to field their Eastern Hockey League teams.
- New York Aviators (2013–15, Empire Division) The organization decided to play in the North American 3 Eastern Hockey League and the Empire franchise was reassigned to the New York Dragons. The Aviators returned to the USPHL with an Elite Division and youth teams in 2016. The former NA3EHL team became the Long Island Sharks in the North American 3 Hockey League.
- New York Dragons Announced team for the 2015–16 season in the USP3 Division with the franchise rights from the previous New York Aviators but appears to have dropped from the division prior to the season.
- Northern Colorado Eagles (2020–23, Mountain Division) Joined from the Western States Hockey League; a new ownership group founded the Colorado Grit in the North American Hockey League, which displaced the USPHL team.
- Ogden Mustangs || Premier 2023–2026 – then moved to NAHL along with 4 other division teams,
- Okanagan European Eagles (2015–17, Premier Division) A team based in Austria made up of European players. Left the league after two seasons.
- Palm Beach Hawks (2013–19, various junior and youth divisions) Joined from the EJHL South with members in the Elite and Empire Divisions in 2013. Both junior teams folded during the 2018–19 season.
- Philadelphia Flyers Junior Hockey Club (2013–17, Premier Division) An expansion team and founding member of the USPHL Premier. Sold to the Lightning Hockey Club and relocated to Newark, Delaware, in 2017. The Lightning HC were removed from the league prior to the start of the 2017–18 season.
- Philadelphia Hockey Club (2020–22, NCDC/Premier Divisions) joined EHL in 2022
- Pittsburgh Vengeance (2018–2022, Premier Division) Joined form the NA3HL as part of the USPHL Premier that created the Great Lakes division.
- Portland Jr. Pirates (2013–16, Premier/Elite/18U Divisions) Based out of Saco, Maine. Not listed by USPHL in 2016 but continues to operate youth hockey programs outside the USPHL umbrella.
- Providence Capitals (2014–16, Elite/18U/16U Divisions)
- Pueblo Bulls Premier 2023–2026 – then moved to NAHL along with 4 other division teams
- Richmond Generals (2013–23)
- River Falls Renegades (2016–17, Elite Division) Former SCV Magicians, were not listed in the league membership for 2017–18.
- Rochester Jr. Americans (2013–16, Premier/Elite/18U Divisions) Replaced by the Rochester Monarchs organization.
- Rochester Monarchs (2016–2017, Elite; 2017–2020, Premier; 2017–2020, NCDC) Member of the inaugural NCDC season; NCDC membership revoked by the USPHL for poor performance after the 2019–20 season and the organization decided to fold its Premier team as well.
- Rochester Vipers
- Seacoast Spartans (2024–25) after one season, the franchise was purchased and re-branded to NY Dynamo
- St. Croix Valley Magicians (2015–16, Midwest Division) Joined as the Hudson Crusaders of Hudson, Wisconsin, from the Minnesota Junior Hockey League in 2015; rebranded prior to their first season in the USPHL and relocated mid-season to Vadnais Heights, Minnesota; relocated again in 2016 to become the River Falls Renegades in River Falls, Wisconsin.
- Seattle Ravens (2016–17, USP3 Division); Joined from the Northern Pacific Hockey League for the 2016–17 season; Left the league in 2017, rebranded as the Kent Ravens and joined the Western States Hockey League but folded prior to playing a game.
- Skipjacks Hockey (2017–2021, Premier)
- Soo Firehawks Announced team for 2015–16 season in the Midwest Division; formerly in the Midwest Junior Hockey League; ceased operations prior to first season.
- Southern Oregon Spartans (2020, Premier Division) Joined from the Western States Hockey League, but were forced to withdraw early into the 2020–21 season due to COVID-19 pandemic restrictions; opted out of the 2021–22 season as well.
- Southern Tier Xpress Announced team in the new Great Lakes division of the USPHL Premier for 2018–19 season after a move from the North American 3 Hockey League. The Tier II Philadelphia Rebels then relocated as the Jamestown Rebels and the Xpress returned their franchise to the league. The Xpress franchise was replaced by Lake Erie Bighorns franchise in the Great Lakes division.
- St. Louis Storm Announced team for 2015–16 season in the Midwest Division; formerly the St. Louis Frontenacs of the Minnesota Junior Hockey League; ceased operations prior to first season.
- Syracuse Stars (2015–19) The Premier team launched in 2015–16 with the purchase of the Bay State Breakers franchise. In 2019, the Stars merged with the Utica Jr. Comets organization and continued operations under that name.
- Team Comcast (2014–15, 18U/16U Divisions) Youth teams associated with the Philadelphia Flyers Junior Hockey Club. In March 2016, was renamed Virtua Hockey and joined the Atlantic Youth Hockey League.
- Traverse City Hounds (2015–16, Midwest Division) Joined from the Midwest Junior Hockey League in 2015; renamed Traverse City North Stars after the former NAHL team in 2016.
- Traverse City North Stars (2016–17, USP3 Division) Went dormant prior to the 2017–18 season.
- Tri-City Icehawks (2015–19, Midwest/USP3/Premier Division) A Bay City, Michigan, team that joined from the Minnesota Junior Hockey League in the Midwest Division for 2015–16. Played their final USPHL season in the Premier Midwest East Division.
- Tri-City Outlaws (2016–17, USP3 Division) Joined from the Northern Pacific Hockey League for the 2016–17 season; not listed as a member of the USPHL for the 2017–18 season.
- West Sound Warriors (2016–17, USP3 Division) Joined from the Northern Pacific Hockey League for the 2016–17 season; suspended operations in 2017. The Vancouver Rangers of the WSHL relocated to Bremerton and became the West Sound Warriors for the 2017–18 season.
- Wisconsin Muskies (2017–18, Premier Division) Played out of Spooner, Wisconsin; removed from team listing after one season and arena issues.
- Wooster Oilers (2018–2022, Premier Division)
