= Minnesota Mullets =

Junior ice hockey team in Minnesota, USA

- City: Minneapolis, Minnesota
- League: USPHL-Premier
- Division: Midwest
- Founded: 1993
- Home arena: Augsburg University Ice Arena
- Owner: Chris Walby
- Head coach: Chris Walby (2017–18)
- Affiliates: Jersey Hitmen (NCDC)

Franchise history
- 1993–2000: East Metro Lakers
- 2000–2009: St. Paul Lakers
- 2009–2014: Edina Lakers
- 2014–2017: Forest Lake Lakers
- 2017–present: Minnesota Mullets

The Minnesota Mullets are a Tier III junior ice hockey team located in Minneapolis, Minnesota. The Mullets play in the United States Premier Hockey League (USPHL) Premier Division. From 1993 to 2015, the team played in the former Minnesota Junior Hockey League (MnJHL). For most of the franchise's existence, it was known as the Lakers and played in various cities in the Minneapolis-Saint Paul area.

== History ==
Formed by Ralph Hayne in 1993 as the East Metro Lakers, the team called Aldrich Arena in White Bear Lake home until 2000. Under the guidance of coach Mike LaValle, the Lakers won the USA Hockey Junior B National Tournament in 1999.

Forest Lake Lakers logo.

The team renamed St. Paul Lakers and moved to Highland Arena for one season before relocating to Veterans Memorial Community Center in Inver Grove Heights. In 2009, it was renamed Edina Lakers when the club called Minnesota Made Ice Center. In 2014, the team relocated again to Forest Lake and became the Forest Lake Lakers.

In 2015, the Minnesota Junior Hockey League was merged into the United States Premier Hockey League as part of the Midwest Division, a new Tier III league within the USPHL. However, the Midwest did not have its own league playoff championships, but instead the top teams from the Midwest Division played the top teams from the USP3 Division for a single championship. The Lakers won their conference semifinals, qualifying for the USPHL USP3/Midwest playoffs but failed to move on past the round robin stage. In 2016, the Midwest Division was split up among the USPHL Elite and USP3 Divisions with the Forest Lake Lakers going to the Elite Division. In April 2016, Kasey Yoder replaced Dennis Canfield as head coach and general manager.

On September 9, 2016, Hayne sold the franchise to Chris Walby. Walby then took over as head coach and general manager from the recently promoted Yoder. He then led the Lakers to a 23–17–4 record and a home playoff spot in the first round. At the conclusion of the 2016–17 season, Walby renamed the franchise to the Minnesota Mullets while remaining in Forest Lake. The Mullets also became a player development affiliate of the Jersey Hitmen of the National Collegiate Development Conference, a new higher-level league run by the USPHL for the 2017–18 season. In 2019, the team moved to Northeast Ice Arena in Minneapolis.

== Season-by-season records ==
Season	GP	W	L	T	OTL	Pts	GF	GA	Regular season finish	Playoffs
Minnesota Junior Hockey League
1999–00	36	4	31	0	1	9	97	266	7th, MNJHL	
2000–01	36	11	21	—	4	26	130	205	4th, MNJHL	
2001–02	42	13	24	—	5	31	145	209	6th, MNJHL	
2002–03	42	26	16	—	0	52	186	156	4th, MNJHL	
2003–04	40	20	18	1	1	42	174	170	3rd, MNJHL	
2004–05	48	14	29	3	2	33	176	211	5th, MNJHL	
2005–06	48	10	35	2	1	23	163	271	7th, MNJHL	
2006–07	40	6	31	1	2	15	144	298	6th, MNJHL	
2007–08	48	9	38	1	0	19	174	299	8th, MNJHL	
2008–09	48	12	33	1	2	7	168	279	8th, MNJHL	
2009–10	50	27	19	0	4	58	195	162	6th, MNJHL	Lost Division Quarterfinals
2010–11	45	21	20	—	4	46	162	173	5th, MNJHL	
2011–12	48	20	27	—	1	41	160	249	6th, MNJHL	
2012–13	50	23	23	—	4	50	189	220	6th, MNJHL-MN	Lost Division Quarterfinals
2013–14	46	12	30	—	4	28	107	205	7th, MNJHL-MN	Lost Division Quarterfinals
2014–15	42	26	16	—	—	52	163	109	6th, MNJHL-MN	Lost Division Semifinals
United States Premier Hockey League
2015–16	48	39	7	—	2	80	257	91	1st of 9, Western Conf. 2nd of 17, Elite	Won Conf. Quarterfinals, 2–1 vs. Decatur Blaze; Won Conf. Semifinals, 2–1 vs. Wisconsin Rapids Riverkings; 1–1–1 in USPHL Round Robin (L, 1–3 vs. Eels-USP3; W, 6–3 vs. Hounds-Midwest; T, 2–2 vs. Hitmen-USP3)
2016–17	44	23	16	—	5	51	145	135	4th of 8, Midwest; 13th of 27, Elite	Lost div. quarter-finals, 1–2 vs. Chicago Cougars
2017–18	44	26	15	—	3	55	165	122	4th of 9, Midwest West; 15th of 44, Premier	Won First Round series, 2–0 vs. Wisconsin Muskies; Lost quarterfinals, 0–2 vs. Minnesota Moose
2018–19	44	22	19	—	3	47	155	145	6th of 9, Midwest West; 28th of 52, Premier	Lost First Round series, 0–2 vs. Wisconsin Rapids Riverkings
2019–20	44	22	17	—	5	49	175	149	6th of 9, Midwest West; 26th of 52, Premier	Lost First Round series, 0–2 vs. Minnesota Moose
2020–21	44	19	20	—	5	43	157	168	6th of 9, Midwest West; 34th of 62, Premier	Lost First Round series, 0–2 vs. Hudson Havoc
2021–22	44	18	24	—	2	38	131	164	6th of 8, Midwest West; 45th of 64, Premier	Lost First Round series, 1-3 vs. Hudson Havoc
2022–23	44	7	36	—	1	15	89	209	9th of 9, Midwest West; 63rd of 69, Premier	Did not qualify
2023–24	44	13	31	—	0	26	135	202	8th of 9, Midwest West; 50th of 61, Premier	Lost Div Quarterfinals, 0-2 vs. Wisconsin Rapids Riverkings
2024–25	44	25	17	1	1	52	191	148	4th of 9, Midwest West; 32nd of 71, Premier	Won Div Quarterfinals, 2-1 vs. Dell Ducks; Lost Div Semifinal 0-2 Minnesota Squatch
2025–26	43	11	31	1	0	23	102	241	7th of 9, Midwest West; 32nd of 71, Premier	Lost Div Quarterfinals, 0-2 vs. Norwest Express

== Notable alumni ==
The Lakers have produced a number of alumni playing in higher levels of junior hockey, NCAA Division I and Division III, and ACHA college programs, and professional hockey.

- Matiss Kivlenieks: Lakers in 2013–14 and 2014–15; played for the Columbus Blue Jackets (2019–20)
- Joel Rechlicz: Lakers in 2003–04; played 23 games for the New York Islanders (2008–2010) and three games for Washington Capitals (2011–12)

== Coaches ==
Coach	Seasons	Notes
	1993–95	
Mike LaValle	1995–99	Named assistant coach at Augsburg College
Jeff St. Martin	1999–02	
Don Babineau	2002–04	46-34-1-1 record over two seasons.
Cal Ballard	2004–05	
Stu Ronsberg	2005–08	
Dan Strot	2008–09	
Wes Durand	2009–10	Single season most wins as a member of the MnJHL in franchise history and most goals scored in single season in franchise history.
Kasey Yoder	2010–11	Named assistant coach at Austin Bruins (NAHL)
Joe Long	2011–12	Named assistant coach at Hamline University
Dennis Canfield	2014–2016	Named head coach of the Atlanta Capitals (NA3HL)
Kasey Yoder	2016	
Chris Walby	2016–present	Bought the franchise in September 2016, renamed it to Minnesota Mullets the next season.
