= Minnesota Junior Hockey League =

- Sport: Ice hockey
- Founded: 1974
- Folded: 2015
- Replaced by: Most teams merged into the USPHL
- No. of teams: 17
- Country: United States
- Last champion: Dells Ducks (2014–15)
- Most titles: Rochester Ice Hawks (6)
- Website: MNJHL.org

The Minnesota Junior Hockey League (MnJHL) was a USA Hockey-sanctioned Tier III junior ice hockey league operated out of Minneapolis-Saint Paul.

== History ==
Established in 1974, the MnJHL developed players 20 years old and younger for over 40 years. Many MnJHL players, coaches and officials alumni have moved on to college hockey and professional hockey leagues.

Since the inaugural season, the MnJHL had expanded up to 17 teams in the 2014–15 season with teams in Minnesota, Wisconsin, Illinois, Indiana, Michigan, Missouri and Ohio.

The league has a history of USA Hockey national championship teams. League members won national championships six times in the 1990s.

In 2012, the MnJHL expanded outside of the Minnesota and Wisconsin areas adding teams from the Great Lakes Junior Hockey League. The GLJHL switched from USA Hockey to the Amateur Athletic Union and eight of its teams refused to go with it. The eight Great Lakes Division teams formed their own division in the MnJHL while the original teams compete in the Minnesota Division. The Great Lakes Division would be renamed the Central Division prior to the 2014–15 season.

The league also expanded into southern Minnesota for 2012–13. Steele County Blades, based in Owatonna, were approved by the league board and play out of Four Seasons Centre.

The United States Premier Hockey League announced on December 18, 2014, the formation of a Midwest Division to begin in the 2015–16 season by adding the entire Central Division of the MnJHL. By the end of the season most of the remaining teams in the MnJHL (all teams other than the Rochester Ice Hawks and the dormant Twin Cities Northern Lights) had announced their intentions to join the USPHL Midwest. On April 29, 2015, it was announced that the league had disbanded for the 2015–16 season. On May 21, 2015, the Rochester Ice Hawks were approved to join the North American 3 Hockey League (NA3HL) to begin playing in the 2015–16 season. In June, the Wooster Oilers would drop out of the USPHL and only field a team in the NA3HL using the Cleveland Jr. Lumberjacks franchise it had purchased on February 12, 2015. Prior to starting their first season in the USPHL, the Ironwood Fighting Yoopers and Minnesota Owls announced they would go dormant for the 2015–16 season due to lack of players, the Crystal Lake Rampage were replaced with the Chicago Cougars, the Fort Wayne Federals were replaced with the Indiana Attack but ceased operations prior to their first season, the Hudson Crusaders were renamed the SCV Magicians, the St. Louis Frontenacs were renamed the St. Louis Storm but ceased operations prior to their first season, and the Maple Grove Energy were relocated to become the Blaine Energy.

== Teams at the conclusion of the 2014–15 season ==
Minnesota Division
Team	City	Arena
Dells Ducks	Lake Delton, Wisconsin	Poppy Waterman Ice Arena
Forest Lake Lakers	Forest Lake, Minnesota	Forest Lake Sports Center
Hudson Crusaders	Hudson, Wisconsin	Hudson Civic Center
Ironwood Fighting Yoopers	Ironwood, Michigan	Pat O'Donnell Center
Maple Grove Energy	Maple Grove, Minnesota	Maple Grove Ice Arena and Community Center
Minnesota Owls	Isanti, Minnesota	David Johnson Civic Arena
Rochester Ice Hawks	Rochester, Minnesota	Rochester Olmstead Recreation Center
Steele County Blades	Owatonna, Minnesota	Four Seasons Centre
Central Division
Team	City	Arena
Illiana Blackbirds	Dyer, Indiana	Midwest Training & Ice Center
Marquette Royales	Marquette, Michigan	Lakeview Arena
St. Louis Frontenacs	St. Louis, Missouri	FSI Shark Tank Arena
Tri-City Ice Hawks	Bay City, Michigan	Bay County Civic Arena
Wisconsin Rapids Riverkings	Wisconsin Rapids, Wisconsin	South Wood County Rec center
Wooster Oilers	Wooster, Ohio	Alice Noble Ice Arena
Dormant during the 2014–15 season
Crystal Lake Rampage	Crystal Lake, Illinois	Crystal Ice House (CIH)
Ft. Wayne Federals	Fort Wayne, Indiana	Lutheran Health Sportscenter
Twin Cities Northern Lights	Bloomington, Minnesota	Bloomington Ice Garden

=== Former teams ===
- Central Wisconsin Saints (2012–2014) - relocated and became the Wisconsin Rapids Riverkings
- Chicago Jr. Bulldogs (2012–2013) - joined from GMJHL, moved to NA3HL
- Dubuque Thunderbirds (2000–2006) - moved to CSHL
- Edina Jr. Stingers - folded
- Granite City Lumberjacks (2007–2011) - moved to NA3HL
- Iron Range Yellow Jackets (1999–2002) - folded
- Minnesota Flying Aces (2007–2011) - moved to NA3HL
- Minnesota Wildcats (2005–2011) - folded and replaced with the Maple Grove Energy.
- Jr. Kodiaks (?–2000) – folded
- North Suburban Hawks – folded
- South Suburban Steers – became the Twin Cities Northern Lights
- St. Louis (Twin Bridges) Lightning (2004–2005) - sold & relocated to Maple Grove (Minnesota Wildcats)
- Shattuck-St. Mary's Sabres (?–2003) - team now plays a Midget Major schedule in CSDHL
- Tri-Metro Whalers - folded
- Wisconsin Mustangs (2004–2010) - moved to SIJHL
- Wisconsin Rampage (?–2013) relocated to Crystal Lake, Illinois

== Playoff champions ==
Season	League/Bush Cup Champion	National Tournament Qualifier
1973–74	North St. Paul	
1974–75	West St. Paul	
1975–76	West St. Paul	
1976–77	Bloomington	
1977–78	West St. Paul	
1978–79	Wayzata	
1979–80	West St. Paul	
1980–81	Wayzata	
1981–82	North Suburban	
1982–83	North Suburban	
1983–84	West St. Paul	
1984–85	North Suburban	
1985-86	Edina Jr. Stingers	Edina Jr. Stingers
1986–87	Tri-Metro Whalers	
1987–88	Tri-Metro Whalers	
1988–89	North Suburban Hawks	
1989–90	West Suburban Kodiaks	Northland Voyageurs
1990–91	Tri-Metro Whalers	
1991–92	Northland Voyageurs	
1992–93	West Suburban Kodiaks	
1993–94	North Metro Owls	
1994–95	Minneapolis Kodiaks	
1995–96	Minneapolis Kodiaks	
1996–97	Jr. Kodiaks	
1997–98	North Metro Owls	East Metro Lakers
1998-99	East Metro Lakers	—
1999–00	Iron Range Yellow Jackets	—
2000—01	Iron Range Yellow Jackets	—
2001–02	Iron Range Yellow Jackets	—
2002–03	Twin Cities Northern Lights	Dubuque Thunderbirds
2003–04	Dubuque Thunderbirds	Minnesota Ice Hawks
2004–05	Minnesota Ice Hawks	Dubuque Thunderbirds
2005–06	Minnesota Ice Hawks	Twin Cities Northern Lights
2006–07	Minnesota Ice Hawks	Minnesota Owls
2007–08	Minnesota Ice Hawks	Minnesota Owls
2008–09	Minnesota Ice Hawks	Granite City Lumberjacks
2009–10	Rochester Ice Hawks	Twin Cities Northern Lights
2010–11	Granite City Lumberjacks	Hudson Crusaders, Rochester Ice Hawks
2011–12	Twin Cities Northern Lights	Rochester Ice Hawks
2012–13	Twin Cities Northern Lights	—
2013–14	Marquette Royales	Dells Ducks
2014–15	Dells Ducks	Dells Ducks

== National champions ==
- 1989–90: Northland Voyageurs
- 1991–92: Northland Voyageurs
- 1992–93: West Suburban Kodiaks
- 1994–95: Minneapolis Kodiaks
- 1996–97: Jr. Kodiaks
- 1998–99: East Metro Lakers
