= 2011–12 AWHL season =

- League: American West Hockey League
- Sport: Ice hockey
- Duration: September 30, 2011 – March 10, 2012
- Games: 144
- Teams: 6
- Total attendance: 94,968
- Average attendance: 659

Regular Season
- Season champions: Missoula Maulers (1st)

Lewis & Clark Cup
- Champions: Helena Bighorns (1st)
- Runners-up: Missoula Maulers

AWHL seasons
- 2012–13 →

The 2011–12 AWHL season was the first season for the newly formed American West Hockey League. The AWHL was formed in the summer of 2011 by teams breaking away from the Northern Pacific Hockey League (NorPac). The league shared a similar area as the former America West Hockey League that merged into the North American Hockey League in 2003. Bozeman, Billings, Great Falls, and Helena all had teams in the old AWHL.

== Regular season ==
Place	Team	GP	W	L	OTL1	OTL2	SOL	GF	GA	Pts
1	Missoula Maulers	48	41	6	0	0	1	253	102	83
2	Helena Bighorns	48	39	6	1	1	1	279	85	79
3	Billings Bulls	48	26	17	3	1	1	202	187	53
4	Gillette Wild	48	23	23	0	2	0	196	218	46
5	Bozeman Icedogs	48	14	34	0	0	0	131	207	28
6	Great Falls Americans	48	1	46	1	0	0	97	359	2

== Playoffs ==
=== AWHL semifinals ===
Missoula defeated Gillette in six games and Helena defeated Billings in five games to advance to the AWHL championship.

=== AWHL championship ===
Helena swept Missoula in four games in the AWHL championship to earn the first American West Hockey League championship.

== USA Hockey Tier III Junior National Championship ==
The Helena Bighorns, Missoula Maulers, and Billings Bulls won the right to represent the AWHL at the 2012 USA Hockey Tier III Junior National Tournament. Each team played three games in their pool, with the winners of each pool advancing to the national semifinals.

Helena won two games and lost one in pool play and did not advance to the semifinals. Missoula won two games and lost one in pool play and did not advance to the semifinals. Billings won all three games in their pool and advanced to the semifinals. They lost their semifinal game 4–2 to the eventual national champion Atlanta Jr. Knights of the EJHL South.
