= 2012–13 AWHL season =

- League: American West Hockey League
- Sport: Ice hockey
- Duration: September 28, 2012 – March 2, 2013
- Games: 178
- Teams: 7
- Total attendance: 102,419
- Average attendance: 575

Regular Season
- Season champions: Helena Bighorns (1st)

Lewis & Clark Cup
- Champions: Helena Bighorns (2nd)
- Runners-up: Yellowstone Quake

AWHL seasons
- ← 2011–12 2013–14 →

The 2012–13 AWHL season was the second season of the American West Hockey League. The regular season schedule ran from September 28, 2012, to March 2, 2013.

== Team changes ==
The Yellowstone Quake joined the AWHL from the Northern Pacific Hockey League (NorPac) as the league's seventh member.

The Glacier Nationals, a team in the Northern Pacific Hockey League, played 20 games (10 home, 10 away) against AWHL teams in order to alleviate the travel time Glacier had to make to play other teams in their league. Glacier was the farthest east of all of the NorPac teams at the time.

== Regular season ==
Place	Team	GP	W	L	OTL	SOL	GF	GA	Pts
1	Helena Bighorns	48	44	2	2	0	334	55	90
2	Yellowstone Quake	48	35	11	2	0	234	155	72
3	Gillette Wild	48	30	14	4	0	224	165	64
4	Missoula Maulers	48	28	18	1	1	219	152	58
5	Billings Bulls	48	20	23	3	2	142	176	45
6	Great Falls Americans	48	16	30	1	1	129	194	34
7	Bozeman Icedogs	48	1	47	0	0	72	376	2

== Playoffs ==
=== AWHL Semifinals ===
The Helena Bighorns swept the Missoula Maulers in three games to advance to the finals. The Yellowstone Quake also swept the Gillette Wild in three games to reach the finals.

=== AWHL Finals ===
The Helena Bighorns swept the Yellowstone Quake in three games to win the 2012-2013 AWHL Championship.

== USA Hockey Tier III Junior National Championship ==
By winning the AWHL Championship, Helena earned a berth to the 2013 USA Hockey Tier III Junior National Championship in Rochester, Minnesota. The Bighorns went 2–1 in pool play, with a 2–1 overtime win against the New Jersey Rockets of the Metropolitan Junior Hockey League, an 11–2 win over the Boch Blazers of the Eastern States Hockey League, and a 5–3 loss to the Atlanta Jr. Knights of the EJHL South. The Bighorns earned the second seed in their group and advanced to the semifinals, losing to the eventual national champion North Iowa Bulls 3–2 in the second overtime period.
