= Ice hockey in Oregon =

- Flag of Oregon
- Country: United States
- Governing body: USA Hockey
- National teams: Men's national team Women's national team
- First played: 1914

Club competitions
- List: PCHA, WHL (major professional) NWHL, NwHL, PCHL, WHL (minor professional) WIHL (semi-professional) WHL, NorPac, USPHL, WSHL (junior)

Oregon was one of the first states in the union to have an established ice hockey team. The state continued to have a low but consistent level of engagement for many years afterwards.

== History ==
In 1914, the New Westminster Royals relocated to Portland and renamed themselves the Rosebuds. The club was a member of the PCHA, the main competitor to the NHA and played at the highest level of the sport. In just its second season in Portland, the Rosebuds won the league championship and met the Montreal Canadiens for 1916 Stanley Cup Final. Despite playing the entire series in Montreal, Portland pushed the series to a deciding 5th game and had a 1-goal lead before surrendering 2 goals and losing to the home team. Unfortunately, Portland wasn't able to build on that success folded just two years later.

In the mid 20s, a second relocation brought the Rosebuds back, this time as a member of the WHL (the successor to the PCHA). Portland finished 4th in the standings out of 6 teams, however, the league collapsed after the season when all three west coast teams dissolved. The player contracts from that team were sold for $100,000 and used as the basis for a new NHL expansion team, the Chicago Black Hawks.

Immediately after the end of the Rosebuds, the Portland Buckaroos were founded and used the Rosebuds' old venue, the Portland Ice Arena. The team would play in several different minor leagues over the next 15 years but were finally killed off in the early years of World War II. Near the end of the war, professional hockey returned to Portland in the form of the Portland Eagles. The team was less successful than the Buckaroos and played its final season in 1951.

The state was devoid of a major ice hockey team for nearly a decade but the completion of the Memorial Coliseum allowed the sport to return. The Buckaroos were resurrected and won the league championship in their first year back on the ice. Two more championships followed and the team was successful enough to sign an affiliation deal with the Los Angeles Kings in the 1970s. Unfortunately, the Western Hockey League folded in 1974 and left the Buckaroos scrambling to find a new home. Portland played in the WIHL for a year before attempting to found a fully professional league with 6 other teams in the region. The effort failed and the Northwest Hockey League couldn't complete one season of play.

In the wake of Buckaroos dissolution, the Memorial Coliseum was looking for a new tenant. At the same time, the presence of the WHA's Edmonton Oilers made finances difficult for the Edmonton Oil Kings and the team saw relocation as a solution to their problem. The franchise changed its name to Winterhawks and took up residence in the Coliseum. despite playing junior hockey, the team was an instant hit and became one of the top teams in the WHL. Portland had won three league titles and three Memorial Cups, the most recent coming in 2013.

The success of the Winterhawks led to an increased interest in junior hockey in the state and several other teams were founded in the early 21st century. The River City Jaguars made their debut in 2004 and were followed by the Eugene Generals and Rogue Valley Wranglers. All three initially played in the Northern Pacific Hockey League, a Tier III junior league but by 2010 River City had moved to nearby Vancouver, Washington. Two years later Rogue Valley, who had since ben renamed the 'Southern Oregon Spartans', joined the Western States Hockey League. They continued with that league until 2020 when the COVID-19 pandemic caused the league to suspend operations. Southern Oregon attempted to forge ahead the following year by playing on outdoor rink with limited capacity (mandated by COVID protocols) but they would only able to play six games before folding. The WSHL announced that it would return in 2021–22 with a new franchise in Medford, the Rogue Valley Royals. However, the return never materialized and the Royals ended up joining the USPHL.

In the meantime, the Generals continued with the NPHL until the league dissolution in 2016. They then joined the USPHL for two years before playing as an independent during the 2018–19 season. The Generals announced that they were suspending operations in 2019 and would return the following year after promoting out of Tier III, though no formalized plans were given at the time. Their return coincided with the arrival of the pandemic and no further announcements have been made regarding the team, leaving effectively defunct as of 2023.

== Teams ==
=== Professional ===
==== Inactive ====
Team	City	League	Years active	Fate
Portland Rosebuds	Portland	PCHA	1914–1918 ^{†}	Defunct
Portland Rosebuds (2nd iteration)	Portland	WHL	1925–1926 ^{†}	Defunct
Portland Buckaroos	Portland	PCHL; NWHL; WHL / WIHL / NwHL	1928–1931; 1933–1941; 1960–1976	Defunct
Portland Eagles	Portland	PCHL	1944–1951	Defunct

=== Junior ===
==== Active ====
Team	City	League	Arena	Founded
Portland Winterhawks	Portland	WHL	Veterans Memorial Coliseum	1976 ^{†}
Rogue Valley Royals	Medford	USPHL	RRRink	2021

==== Inactive ====
Team	City	League	Years active	Fate
River City Jaguars	Beaverton	NorPac	2004–2010	Defunct
Eugene Generals	Eugene	NorPac, USPHL	2005–2019	Defunct
Southern Oregon Spartans	Medford	NorPac, WSHL, USPHL	2007–2021	Defunct

† relocated from elsewhere.

=== Timeline ===
Active Active (out of state)

== Players ==
=== Notable players by city ===
location of cities

Oregon has had a few player of note hail from the state over the years. While several have gone on to play at the highest levels of the sport, many were born in the state but raised elsewhere.

==== Ashland ====
- Jasper Weatherby ^{†}

==== Gresham ====
- Derek Gustafson
- Ian Kidd

==== Portland ====
- Grant Sasser

==== Raised out of state ====
- Jere Gillis
- Scott Levins
- Jacob MacDonald
- Jordan Smotherman

† relocated from elsewhere.
