= Eugene Generals =

- City: Eugene, Oregon
- Founded: 2005
- Home arena: The Rink Exchange in the Lane Events Center
- Colors: Blue, gold, black
- General manager: Flint Doungchak
- Head coach: Justin Kern (2014–15)mid-season

Franchise history
- 2005–2018: Eugene Generals

The Eugene Generals are a USA Hockey-sanctioned Tier III junior ice hockey team. The team plays their home games at 2,700-seat the Rink Exchange in the Lane Events Center in Eugene, Oregon. The team announced it is on hiatus for the 2019–20 season.

== History ==
The franchise joined the Northern Pacific Hockey League (originally called NorPac and later known as NPHL) in 2005 when the league was a Jr. B league, in 2007 the league and member teams were granted Tier III Jr. A status by USA Hockey, the governing body for ice hockey in the United States. In 2016, the NPHL was dissolved after two of the six members withdrew from the league. The four remaining teams, including the Generals, were then added to the USP3 Pacific Division of the United States Premier Hockey League.

After one season in the USPHL, the league reorganized its divisions when it added an unsanctioned higher league called the National Collegiate Development Conference, ultimately leading to the junior-level USPHL leagues to operate independently from USA Hockey sanctioning for 2017–18. The USP3 Division would be dissolved and the Generals were added to the Elite Division. During the off-season, the other three former NPHL teams left the USPHL, isolating the Generals geographically from the rest of the league. The Generals decided to remain in the USPHL, but would fill their schedule independently with nearby teams from academies and U18 Tier 1 AAA youth hockey organizations, only playing against other USPHL teams in showcases during the 2017–18 season. As Generals' general manager Flint Doungchak is also the USA Hockey Pacific District coach, the Generals were able to retain USA Hockey sanctioning for 2017–18 as an independent junior team. After the 2017–18 season, the Generals also left the USPHL to play an independent junior schedule. In their independent 2018–19 schedule, the Generals played against a mix of university club teams and Tier 1 youth teams.

In 2019, they announced they would take the 2019–20 season off to prepare to move up a level from their current Tier III designation by USA Hockey. The team did not specify what league, if any, they were planning on joining.

== Season-by-season records ==
=== Regular season ===
Glossary: GP = Games played, W = Wins, L = Losses, OTL = Overtime Losses, SOL = Shootout Losses, PTS = Points, GF = Goals For, GA = Goals Against

Season	GP	W	L	OTL	SOL	PTS	PCT	GF	GA	Finish
Northern Pacific Hockey League
2005–06	44	31	13	—	—	62	.705	250	146	2nd of 6, West
2006–07	44	26	18	—	—	52	.591	248	168	3rd of 6, Pacific
2007–08	48	35	15	—	—	66	.729	257	179	3rd of 7, Pacific
2008–09	48	38	10	—	—	76	.792	264	143	2nd of 7, Pacific
2009–10	48	38	10	—	—	76	.792	254	132	2nd of 6, Pacific
2010–11	50	24	26	—	—	48	.480	208	191	3rd of 5, Pacific
2011–12	42	22	18	2	—	46	.548	166	159	4th of 7, NorPac
2012–13	40	25	14	0	1	51	.638	187	170	2nd of 6, NorPac
2013–14	40	17	22	0	1	35	.438	148	154	3rd of 5, NPHL
2014–15	42	13	28	0	1	27	.321	120	243	5th of 6, NPHL
2015–16	40	21	17	1	1	44	.550	149	113	3rd of 6, NPHL
United States Premier Hockey League
2016–17	44	34	7	3	—	71	.806	237	111	1st of 4, Pacific Div. 3rd of 27, USPHL-USP3
2017–18	14	7	7	0	—	14	.500	34	35	USPHL-Elite
2017–18	33	8	24	0	1	17	.258	73	154	Overall

=== Norpac/NPHL playoffs ===
Season	Quarterfinals	Semifinals	Finals
2006	Won 2–1 vs. Puget Sound Tomahawks	Won 3–1 vs. Tri-City Titans	Lost 2–3 vs. Queen City Cutthroats
2007	Won 3–1 vs. Seattle Totems	Lost 0–3 vs. Fort Vancouver Pioneers	—
2008	Lost 1–3 vs. Tri-City Titans	—	—
2009	Lost 0–3 vs. River City Jaguars	—	—
2010	Won 3–1 vs. Tri-City Titans	Lost 0–3 vs. Seattle Totems	—
2011	Lost 1–3 vs. Southern Oregon Spartans	—	—
2012	Lost 1–2 vs. Vancouver Victory	—	—
2013	—	Lost 0–3 vs. Bellingham Blazers	—
2014	—	Lost 0–3 vs. West Sound Warriors	—
2015	Did not qualify		
2016	—	Lost 2–3 vs. Bellingham Blazers	—

=== USPHL playoffs ===
- 2017

Eugene Generals defeated the Seattle Ravens 2-games-to-none in Pacific Division USP3 Championship
Eliminated in USP3 Division Round Robin 1–2–0 (Lost, 1–3 vs. Charlotte Rush; Lost, 0–6 vs. Florida Jr. Blades; Won, 2–1 vs. Decatur Blaze)

== Alumni ==
The Generals have had a number of alumni move on to collegiate programs and higher levels of junior ice hockey in the United States and Canada.
