= 2013–14 AWHL season =

- League: American West Hockey League
- Sport: Ice hockey
- Duration: September 19, 2013 – March 8, 2014
- Games: 166
- Teams: 7

Regular Season

Lewis & Clark Cup

AWHL seasons
- ← 2012–13

The 2013–14 AWHL season was the third and final season of the American West Hockey League. The regular season schedule ran from September 19, 2013, to March 8, 2014.

== Season summary ==
In February 2013, it was announced the Glacier Nationals from Whitefish, Montana, were accepted in the AWHL from the Northern Pacific Hockey League (NorPac). The Nationals had played a split schedule with the NorPac and the AWHL during the 2012–13 season to reduce travel costs.

In April 2013, the Missoula Maulers announced that they would be leaving the AWHL and joining the Western States Hockey League.

The Helena Bighorns won their second league title and advanced to the 2014 USA Hockey Tier III Junior Hockey National Championships. The Bighorns would not advance past the pool play.

In March 2014, the league announced it would merge into the North American 3 Hockey League as the Frontier Division. All seven teams made the switch to their new league.
