= Glacier Ice Rink =

Ice arena in Missoula, Montana, United States

Coordinates: 46.848708°N 114.014763°W

- Interactive map of Glacier Ice Rink
- Location: 1101 South Ave West Missoula, Montana; United States
- Owner: Missoula Area Youth Hockey Association
- Operator: Missoula Area Youth Hockey Association
- Capacity: 1,000
- Surface: Ice Rink

Construction
- Opened: November 27, 1997; 28 years ago

Tenants
- Missoula Maulers (NPHL/AWHL/WSHL) (2007–2016); Missoula Jr. Bruins (NA3HL) (2016–2021); Missoula Figure Skating Club; Missoula Curling Club; Missoula Referees Association; Women's Hockey Association of Missoula; University of Montana men's hockey team

Website
- https://www.glaciericerink.com/

The Glacier Ice Rink is a two-sheet ice arena located in Missoula, Montana, on the Missoula County Fairgrounds. The rink and its programs are operated by the Missoula Area Youth Hockey Association (MAYHA), a non-profit organization. The rink is open 10 months a year and offers youth and adult hockey leagues, hockey tournaments, and public skating sessions. Glacier Ice Rink is also home to the Missoula Figure Skating Club, the Missoula Curling Club, the Missoula Referees Association, the Women's Hockey Association of Missoula (WHAM) and the University of Montana men's hockey team. The ice is removed each summer for the Western Montana Fair.

== Tenants ==
- Missoula Figure Skating Club
- Missoula Curling Club
- Missoula Referees Association
- Women's Hockey Association of Missoula (WHAM)
- University of Montana men's hockey team

=== Previous tenants ===
- Missoula Maulers
- Missoula Jr. Bruins
