= West Sound Warriors =

Bremerton Sockeyes
- City: Bremerton, Washington
- League: Northern Pacific Hockey League (2000–2016); USPHL-USP3 (2016–2017); Western States Hockey League (2017–2018); 2024-current USPHL-USP3
- Conference: Premier
- Division: Northwest
- Founded: 2000 (original franchise); 2015 (WSHL franchise)
- Home arena: Bremerton Ice Center
- Colors: Red, salmon and black
- General manager: Steve Soto 2023
- Head coach: Steve Soto 2023

Franchise history
- Original franchise
- 2000–2003: Puget Sound Kings
- 2003–2011: Puget Sound Tomahawks
- 2011–2017: West Sound Warriors
- WSHL franchise
- 2015–2017: Vancouver Rangers
- 2017–2018: West Sound Warriors
- 2018–2019: West Sound Admirals
- USPHL franchise
- 2024–current: Bremerton Sockeyes

The Bremerton Sockeyes begin their inaugural USPHL Premier League hockey season in the 2024-25 season. The Sockeyes are an expansion team competing in the Northwest Division.

The West Sound Warriors were a junior ice hockey that played at the Bremerton Ice Center in Bremerton, Washington. Formerly, the team was a USA Hockey-sanctioned Tier III ice hockey team that played in the Northern Pacific Hockey League (NorPac/NPHL) and the United States Premier Hockey League-USP3 (USPHL-USP3). In the 2017–18 season, the team was an AAU-sanctioned junior team in the Western States Hockey League. The WSHL franchise was sold to a new ownership group in Bremerton after the one season and became the West Sound Admirals.

For most of its history this team was called the Puget Sound Tomahawks. Playing in the NPHL. In 2009 they lost in the first round of the playoffs in the fourth game, in overtime on the road, of a 5-game series.

== History ==
=== 2000–2017 ===
The original franchise joined the NorPac in 2000 as the Puget Sound Kings, playing home games at the Puget Sound Hockey Center in Tacoma, Washington. In 2003, the owners of the Bremerton Ice Center acquired the franchise and moved it to the new arena and renamed to the Tomahawks.

The NorPac was classified as Junior B until 2007, when the league and member teams were granted Jr. A status by USA Hockey, the governing body for ice hockey in the United States. In 2013, the NorPac changed its moniker to NPHL.

=== 2009 ===
In 2009 the Tomahwaks defeated the River City Jaguars on the road, in their last series of the season, to earn their way into a playoff spot. It would be their first playoff appearance in years and the last for the franchise.

In the first round best of 5 they faced their hometown rival, the Seattle Totems. The first 2 games were in Bremerton; the Tomahawks home barn. Game one was a heart breaking loss that slipped away from the T-Hawks. Game 2 was a decisive win for the home team. Games 3 & 4 saw a tremendous effort from the Tomahawks, only to come up short in a heart breaking overtime loss on the road to end the series. The franchise never recovered.

The team changed its name to the West Sound Warriors prior to the 2011–12 season.

The NorPac was classified as Junior B until 2007, when the league and member teams were granted Tier III Jr. A status by USA Hockey, the governing body for ice hockey in the United States. In 2013, the NorPac changed its moniker to NPHL.

In 2016, the NPHL was dissolved after two of the six members withdrew from the league. The four remaining teams, including the Warriors, were then added to the USP3 Pacific Division of the United States Premier Hockey League.

After one season in the USPHL, the franchise announced it was suspending operations for the 2017–18 season.

=== 2017–2018 ===
After the Warriors announced their suspension from the USPHL, the Vancouver Rangers of the Western States Hockey League came to an agreement with the Bremerton Ice Center to relocate to Bremerton from Vancouver, Washington. The Rangers' ownership would continue to own and operate the team but they would take on the identity of the Warriors. After one season, the Warriors announced they would not host a junior team for the 2018–19 season. The WSHL then placed a new team in Bremerton called the West Sound Admirals, managed and owned by the former Vancouver Rangers' head coach and general manager, David Daniello, as a continuation of the former Rangers/Warriors franchise. The Admirals ceased operations two months into their second season and a 0–19 record in November 2019.

== Season-by-season records ==
Season	GP	W	L	OTL	SOL	PTS	GF	GA	Finish	Playoffs
West Sound Warriors
2011–12	42	13	28	1	—	27	156	232	6th of 7, NorPac	Lost Quarterfinals, 0–2 vs. Yellowstone Quake
2012–13	40	31	8	1	0	63	306	122	1st of 6, NorPac	Won Semifinals, 3–0 vs. Glacier Nationals; Lost Finals, 2–3 vs. Bellingham Blazers
2013–14	40	33	4	1	2	69	300	87	2nd of 5, NPHL	Won Semifinals, 3–0 vs. Eugene Generals; Lost Finals, 2–3 vs. Bellingham Blazers
2014–15	42	36	3	2	1	75	320	76	1st of 6, NPHL	Won Semifinals, 3–0 vs. Cheney Ice Hawks; Won Finals, 3–0 vs. Bellingham Blazers; CASCADE CUP CHAMPIONS
2015–16	40	8	30	1	1	18	89	260	6th of 6, NPHL	Did not qualify
2016–17	44	6	37	1	—	13	88	294	4th of 4, USP3-Pacific Div.	Did not qualify
2017–18	51	21	29	1	—	43	210	254	4th of 6, Northwest; 16th of 23, WSHL	Won Div. Quarterfinals, 2–0 vs. Seattle Totems; Lost Div. Semifinals, 0–2 vs. Idaho IceCats
Bremerton Sockeyes
2014–15	44	7	34	1	2	17	82	264	6th of 7, Northwest; 66th of 73 Premier	Did not qualify

== USA Hockey Tier III Junior National Championships ==
2015 Tier III Division 2 National Championships included the champion teams from the Northern Pacific Hockey League (NPHL), Metropolitan Junior Hockey League (MetJHL), USPHL-Elite Division, and USPHL-Empire Division.
Round robin play in pool with top two teams advancing to final.

Year	Round Robin	Record	Ranking	National Championship
2015	L, Boston Jr. Bruins (USHPL-Elite) 2–4; L, New York Aviators (USPHL-Empire) 1–5; W, Boston Junior Rangers (MetJHL) 6-2	1-2-0	3rd of 4	Did not advance

== Alumni ==
The Warriors have had a number of alumni move on to collegiate programs and higher levels of junior ice hockey in the United States and Canada.

Bubba Kaufman (Captain ‘08,’09) Jake Brewer (Assistant Captain ‘08) Rafal Plonski (Assistant Captain ‘08) Ben Surgalski (Assistant Captain ‘08,’09)
