= Bellingham Blazers (2012) =

- City: Bellingham, Washington
- League: United States Premier Hockey League
- Founded: 2012
- Home arena: Bellingham Sportsplex
- Colors: Red, black and white
- Owner: Whatcom Sports Commission
- Head coach: Erick Ruud
- Website: https://whatcomsportsandrec.com/blazers/

Franchise history
- 2012–present: Bellingham Blazers

The Bellingham Blazers are an inactive Amateur Athletic Union-sanctioned Tier II junior ice hockey team in the United States Premier Hockey League. The Blazers are based in Bellingham, Washington and play home games at the Bellingham Sportsplex. The team also has the local youth hockey association named after them, going by the Jr. Blazers.

== History ==
From 2012 to 2016, the Blazers played in the Northern Pacific Hockey League (NorPac/NPHL). In their first two seasons, the Blazers captured the Cascade Cup, awarded to the league playoff champions, and earned a spot in the USA National Tier III Championships. In 2013, coach Mark Collins was also awarded Coach of the Year when the Blazers won their first Cascade Cup. Collins was fired from team before the 2019 playoffs.

In 2016, the team left the NPHL and USA Hockey-sanctioning with the intentions of joining the Amateur Athletic Union-sanctioned Western States Hockey League. The team won its first WSHL division title and made its first Thorne Cup Final appearance in the 2018-19 season.

The Blazers' 2019–20 season ended early due to a COVID-19 outbreak in Washington. The WSHL itself would cancel the rest of the season not long after. The Blazers and the WSHL returned in the 2021–22 season, but it was short-lived due to the WSHL folding all of its US-based teams. The Blazers were able to continue playing in the Canadian division, but would suspend operations not long after.

The Blazers joined the USPHL the following season after the WSHL folded. The Blazers made their first USPHL playoff appearance in the 2024–25 season, losing in the first round to the Seattle Totems.

On September 11, 2025 the Blazers suspended operations for the 2025–26 season due to a lack of players as a result of the rule changes regarding junior players being eligible for NCAA.

On March 22nd, 2026, it was announced that the Junior Prospects Hockey League would be expanding to Bellingham. Known as the Bellingham Hockey Club, the team is scheduled to play their first season in the fall. The current fate of the Blazers is currently unknown.

== Season-by-season records ==
Season	GP	W	L	OTW	OTL	SOL	Pts	GF	GA	Regular season finish	Playoffs
Northern Pacific Hockey League
2012–13	40	22	16	—	1	1	46	204	165	3rd of 6, NorPac	Won Semifinals, 3–0 vs. Eugene Generals; Won Finals, 3–2 vs. West Sound Warriors; CASCADE CUP CHAMPIONS
2013–14	40	35	5	—	0	0	70	230	87	1st of 5, NPHL; McBride Cup	Won Semifinals, 3–0 vs. Tri-City Outlaws; Won Finals, 3–2 vs. West Sound Warriors; CASCADE CUP CHAMPIONS
2014–15	42	33	7	—	0	2	68	269	91	2nd of 6, NPHL	Won Semifinals, 3–2 vs. Wenatchee Wolves; Lost Finals, 0–3 vs. West Sound Warriors
2015–16	40	30	9	—	1	0	61	212	77	2nd of 6, NPHL	Won Semifinals, 3–2 vs. Eugene Generals; Lost Finals, 0–3 vs. Wenatchee Wolves
Western States Hockey League
2016–17	52	15	36	—	1	—	31	122	221	6th of 7, Northwest; 22nd of 27, WSHL	Lost Div. Quarterfinals, 0–2 vs. Butte Cobras
2017–18	51	28	20	—	3	—	59	228	221	3rd of 6, Northwest; 12th of 23, WSHL	Won Div. Quarterfinals, 2–0 vs. Southern Oregon Spartans; Lost Div. Semifinals, 0–2 vs. Tahoe Icemen
2018–19	51	34	14	0	3	—	105 (Note: Beginning with the 2018–19 season, the WSHL began awarding 3pts for a win, 2pts for an overtime win, and 1pt for an overtime loss.)	281	153	2nd of 4, Northwest; 7th of 23, WSHL	Won Div. Semifinals, 2–0 vs. Southern Oregon Spartans; Won Div. Finals, 2–1 vs. Seattle Totems; 0–3–0–0, 6th of 6, Thorne Cup round-robin (L, 0–6 vs. Rhinos; L, 4–6 vs. Jr. Blazers; L, 1–6 vs. Aeros)
2019–20	48	17	26	3	2	—	59	157	232	4th of 5, Northwest; 15th of 20, WSHL	Playoffs cancelled (Note: Bellingham was removed from the playoffs prior to the end of the regular season due to the COVID-19 pandemic; the entire WSHL playoffs were eventually cancelled.)
2020–21	No season due to the COVID-19 pandemic										
2021–22	5	0	5	0	0	—	0	7	50	DNF	Withdrew from season
United States Premier Hockey League - - Premier Division
2022–23	44	9	33	0	2	—	20	120	228	5th of 5, Northwest; 60th of 70, Premier	Did not qualify
2023–24	44	6	36	0	2	—	14	120	228	5th of 5, Northwest; 56th of 61, Premier	Did not qualify
2024–25	44	27	14	1	0	1	55	176	154	3rd of 7, Northwest; 21st of 73, Premier	Lost Div. Semifinal series, 0–2 (Seattle Totems)
2025–26	Suspended Season										

== Tier III Junior Hockey National Championship ==
The Bellingham Blazers qualified for the Tier III Junior Hockey National Championships in 2013 and 2014 by winning their league playoff championship. The Blazers have never past the round-robin stage of the tournament.

Round-robin play in pool with top four overall teams advancing to the semifinal.

Year	Round-robin	Record	Standing	Semifinal game	Championship game
2013	L, Twin Cities Northern Lights (MnJHL) 0–6; L, North Iowa Bulls (NA3HL) 0–7; W, New Hampshire Junior Monarchs (EmJHL) 3–2	1–2–0	3rd of 4 National Pool	Did not advance	
2014	L, Flint Jr. Generals (NA3HL) 1–6; L, Northern Cyclones (EHL) 0–12; L, Springfield Pics (USPHL-Elite) 2–8	0–3–0	4th of 4 Pool B	Did not advance	
