= Chris Holt (ice hockey) =

Canadian-born American ice hockey player

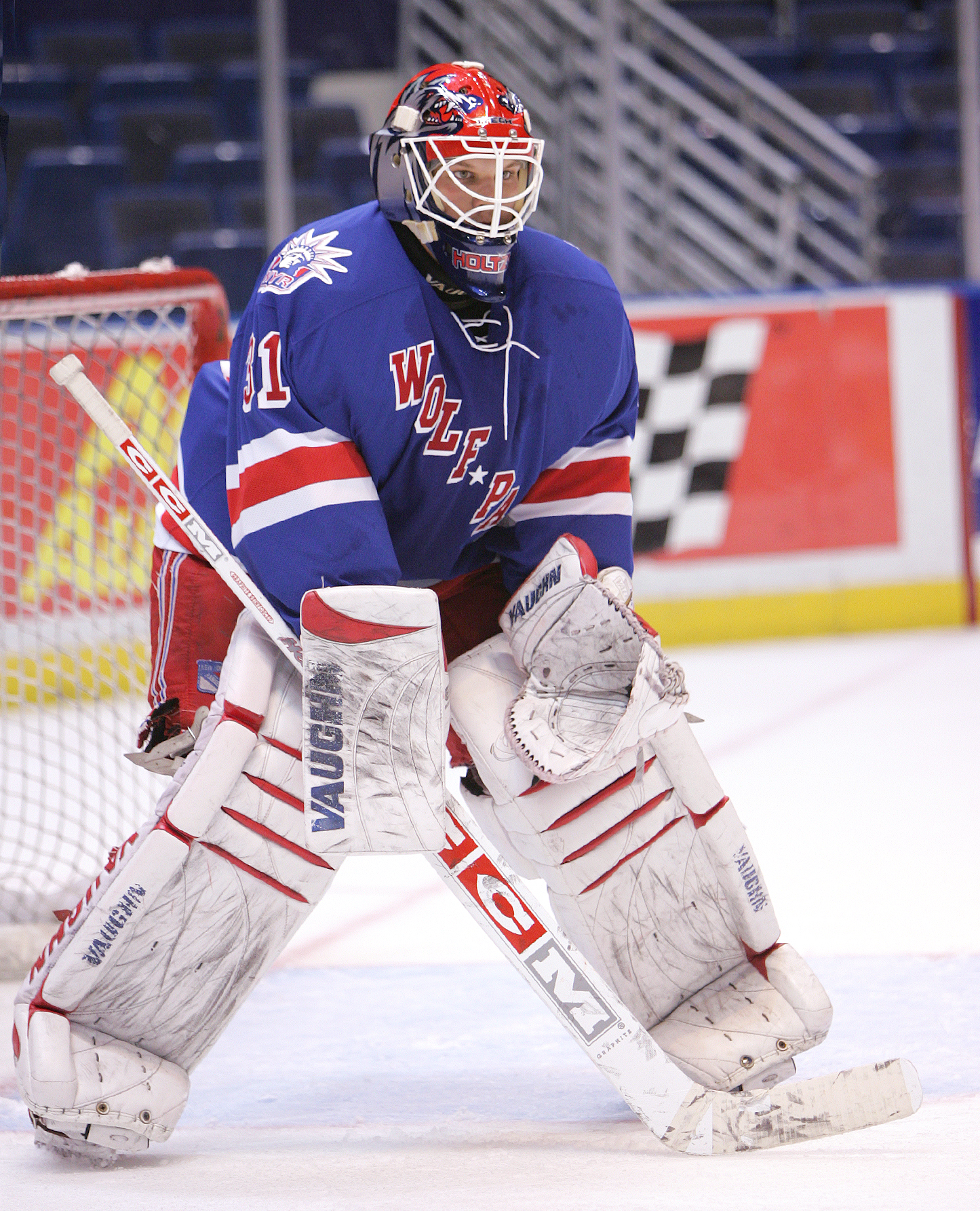
- Holt with the Hartford Wolf Pack in 2006
- Born: June 5, 1985 (age 40) Vancouver, British Columbia, Canada
- Height: 6 ft 4 in (193 cm)
- Weight: 227 lb (103 kg; 16 st 3 lb)
- Position: Goaltender
- Caught: Left
- Played for: New York Rangers; St. Louis Blues; Dinamo Riga; Avtomobilist Yekaterinburg; HC Donbass; Ritten Sport; Orli Znojmo; Braehead Clan
- National team: United States
- NHL draft: 180th overall, 2003; New York Rangers
- Playing career: 2005–2016

Christopher Holt (born June 5, 1985) is a Canadian-born American former professional hockey goaltender who last played with the Braehead Clan of the Elite Ice Hockey League. He also played for the New York Rangers and St. Louis Blues of the National Hockey League, Dinamo Riga, HC Donbass of the Kontinental Hockey League and Orli Znojmo of the Austrian Hockey League.

== Playing career ==
Holt was drafted 180th overall in the 2003 NHL entry draft by the New York Rangers. Holt was first called up from the Hartford Wolf Pack of the American Hockey League (AHL) in December 2005 as backup to Henrik Lundqvist while starting goalie Kevin Weekes was injured. He played just over 10 minutes in one game, not allowing a goal becoming the first former Billings Bulls player to play in the NHL. He was sent back down to Hartford but was recalled to the Rangers on February 23, 2006.

On October 30, 2008, Holt was signed as a free agent by the St. Louis Blues after playing two games for their affiliate the Peoria Rivermen. On October 31, Holt was called up to the Blues on emergency before returning to Peoria. He was again recalled by the Blues on February 6, 2009. He made his first appearance for the Blues, and only his second appearance in the NHL on February 18, 2009, as a replacement for Chris Mason after Mason started the first two periods against the Columbus Blue Jackets, totaling 19 min., giving up no goals on three shots.

In September 2009, prior to the 2009–10 season, he attended the Ottawa Senators training camp. He was demoted to the Binghamton Senators organization which demoted him to the Elmira Jackals on September 30. He was promoted to Binghamton in March 2010. On March 19, 2010, he became the tenth goaltender in AHL history to score a goal, and the sixth to score it by shooting the puck himself. Holt scored on the Rochester Americans while the Americans goalie was pulled for a sixth attacker. In June 2010, it was announced that Holt has signed a two-year deal with the Kontinental Hockey League club Dinamo Riga.

On June 29, 2012, Holt signed a free agent deal with fellow KHL club, Avtomobilist Yekaterinburg. After appearing in 27 games for only 4 wins with the cellar-dwelling Avtomobilist, Holt was traded to HC Donbass for their playoff push to end the 2012–13 season on January 10, 2013.

== International play ==
Despite his Canadian birth, Holt is an American citizen due to his mother being a native of California. He has represented the USA at the 2003 World Junior Championships on the US Under-18 National Team.

On October 20, 2011, he was selected as one of two goalies on the 21-man roster for the 2011 U.S. Men's Select Team that competed at the Deutschland Cup from in Munich, Germany.

== Career statistics ==
=== Regular season and playoffs ===
			Regular season										Playoffs
Season	Team	League	GP	W	L	T	OTL	MIN	GA	SO	GAA	SV%	GP	W	L	MIN	GA	SO	GAA	SV%
2001–02	Billings Bulls	AWHL	24	13	7	1	—	1184	59	2	2.99	.906	—	—	—	—	—	—	—	—
2002–03	U.S. National Development Team	USDP	32	9	15	2	—	1774	95	1	3.20	—	—	—	—	—	—	—	—	—
2003–04	U. of Nebraska-Omaha	CCHA	27	15	17	2	—	1499	81	0	3.24	.900	—	—	—	—	—	—	—	—
2004–05	U. of Nebraska-Omaha	CCHA	37	19	14	4	—	2190	106	1	2.90	.903	—	—	—	—	—	—	—	—
2005–06	Charlotte Checkers	ECHL	23	7	11	—	1	1229	84	0	4.10	.887	—	—	—	—	—	—	—	—
2005–06	Hartford Wolf Pack	AHL	9	3	2	—	1	459	31	0	4.06	.879	8	4	4	487	24	0	2.96	.912
2005–06	New York Rangers	NHL	1	0	0	—	0	10	0	0	0.00	1.000	—	—	—	—	—	—	—	—
2006–07	Charlotte Checkers	ECHL	45	24	18	—	2	2650	139	1	3.15	.898	4	2	2	223	11	0	2.97	.904
2006–07	Hartford Wolf Pack	AHL	6	2	1	—	0	240	8	0	2.00	.918	1	0	0	26	1	0	2.28	.917
2007–08	Charlotte Checkers	ECHL	32	15	13	—	2	1808	82	3	2.72	.915	3	0	3	179	10	0	3.35	.895
2007–08	Hartford Wolf Pack	AHL	9	5	3	—	0	447	18	0	2.42	.906	—	—	—	—	—	—	—	—
2008–09	Alaska Aces	ECHL	5	3	2	—	0	300	9	1	1.80	.946	—	—	—	—	—	—	—	—
2008–09	Peoria Rivermen	AHL	20	10	6	—	2	1111	32	1	1.73	.931	—	—	—	—	—	—	—	—
2008–09	St. Louis Blues	NHL	1	0	0	—	0	19	0	0	0.00	1.000	—	—	—	—	—	—	—	—
2009–10	Elmira Jackals	ECHL	15	9	5	—	1	896	45	0	3.01	.899	5	2	3	297	16	0	3.23	.868
2009–10	Binghamton Senators	AHL	33	16	15	—	1	1872	92	4	2.95	.905	—	—	—	—	—	—	—	—
2010–11	Dinamo Riga	KHL	33	13	11	—	8	1966	81	1	2.47	.924	7	2	5	404	22	0	3.27	.890
2011–12	Dinamo Riga	KHL	45	20	16	—	6	2590	98	5	2.27	.919	5	2	2	287	13	0	2.72	.887
2012–13	Avtomobilist Yekaterinburg	KHL	27	4	16	—	5	1630	77	1	2.83	.912	—	—	—	—	—	—	—	—
2012–13	Donbass Donetsk	KHL	5	2	2	—	1	303	9	1	1.78	.940	—	—	—	—	—	—	—	—
2014–15	Ritten Sport	ITA	11	—	—	—	—	—	—	—	1.72	.941	—	—	—	—	—	—	—	—
2014–15	Orli Znojmo	AUT	27	—	—	—	—	1576	69	1	2.52	.917	2	—	—	50	7	—	8.40	.811
2015–16	Braehead Clan	EIHL	41	22	15	—	4	2396	103	4	2.58	.917	2	—	—	—	—	—	1.92	.939
KHL totals			110	39	45	—	20	6489	265	8	2.45	.920	12	4	7	691	35	0	3.04	.889
NHL totals			2	0	0	—	0	29	0	0	0.00	1.000	—	—	—	—	—	—	—	—

=== International ===
Year	Team	Event	GP	W	L	T	MIN	GA	SO	GAA
2003	United States	WC	2	1	1	0	120	4	0	2.00
Junior int'l totals			2	1	1	0	120	4	0	2.00
