= Centennial Ice Arena =

Ice arena in Billings, Montana

Coordinates: 45°48′24″N 108°27′55″W

- Interactive map of Centennial Ice Arena
- Full name: Centennial Ice Arena
- Location: 427 Bench Boulevard; Billings, Montana 59105
- Owner: Billings Amateur Hockey League
- Capacity: 550

Construction
- Opened: 1981

Tenants
- Billings Bulls (NPHL/AWHL/NA3HL) (2006–2017); Billings Amateur Hockey League (BAHL) (1981–present)

Website
- centennialicearena.net

Centennial Ice Arena is a 550-seat ice arena in Billings, Montana, USA. From 2006 to 2017, the arena played host to the city's only junior league hockey club, the Billings Bulls. It has also hosted the Billings Amateur Hockey League (BAHL) since its opening in 1981, which has programs and leagues for all ages. In addition to Junior hockey and the BAHL, Centennial Ice Arena has also hosted several Select youth hockey teams and has been the home ice for the Montana Thunderblades, a collection of USA Hockey Select teams, including the 2014 14U Boys Tier II National Champions.

Opened in 1981, Centennial Ice Arena replaced the outdoor King Avenue Ice Rink—the city's only fully maintained ice rink at the time. Public demand for a larger, year-round facility to host youth and Junior hockey in Billings prompted the arena's construction.

As early as 2013, there were plans to abandon the arena, as it had a recent history of serious maintenance issues as well as an aging refrigeration system. Later, in 2017, the Billings Bulls ownership pursued the possibility of two new rinks being built in Centennial Park (an unrelated public park on the city’s West End) as cost of repairs for the facility were estimated to be in excess of $750,000.

In the summer of 2026, the city opened the new, state-of-the-art $16 million facility, Signal Peak Energy Arena, in Amend Park on the city’s south side. The new arena boasts two full sized ice sheets. The “Marquee Rink” has a spectator capacity of 2,000, and the “Larson Family Rink” has a capacity of 200. With the announcement of a new ice arena in Billings also came the announcement of a new Tier II Junior hockey team, the Billings Cattle Punchers, who began play in the NAHL in 2026. Several Select youth hockey programs are expected to follow, which may mark the end of an era at Centennial Ice Arena.
