= Milwaukee Power =

- City: Milwaukee, Wisconsin; Mequon, Wisconsin; West Bend, Wisconsin
- League: North American 3 Hockey League
- Home arena: Wilson Ice Arena; Ozaukee Ice Center; Kettle Moraine Ice Center
- Colors: Red, black and white

Franchise history
- 2014–2018: Point Mallard Ducks
- 2018–2023: Milwaukee Power
- 2023–present: West Bend Power

The Milwaukee Power were a Tier III junior ice hockey team that played in the North American 3 Hockey League. The Power last played their home games at the Kettle Moraine Ice Center in West Bend, Wisconsin.

== History ==
On April 16, 2018, the NA3HL announced that the Point Mallard Ducks had been sold to Local Hockey Partners, LLC. For the following year the team was moved to Milwaukee, Wisconsin and renamed to the 'Milwaukee Power'. As a result of the COVID-19 pandemic, the club announced that it would be playing all of its home games at the Ozaukee Ice Center in Mequon, Wisconsin for the 2020–21 season. The following year the team split its time between Milwaukee and West Bend, Wisconsin before playing all of their home games at West Bend in 2022–23. Following that season, the club was sold for a second time and became the West Bend Power.

== Season-by-season records ==
Season	GP	W	L	OTL	SOL	Pts	GF	GA	Regular season finish	Playoffs
2018–19	47	29	15	2	1	61	206	137	3rd of 7, Central Div. 14th of 36, NA3HL	Lost Div. Semifinal series, 1–2 (St. Louis Jr. Blues)
2019–20	47	12	35	0	0	24	120	270	5th of 6, Central Div. 30th of 34, NA3HL	Did not qualify
2020–21	40	11	29	0	0	22	103	161	5th of 6, Central Div. 27th of 31, NA3HL	Did not qualify
2021–22	47	18	26	2	1	39	133	172	5th of 6, Central Div. 22nd of 34, NA3HL	Did not qualify
2022–23	47	31	13	2	1	65	184	122	3rd of 6, Central Div. t–10th of 34, NA3HL	Lost Div. Semifinal series, 1–2 (Oregon Tradesmen)
