= Ozaukee =

Ozaukee may refer to:

- Ozaukee County, Wisconsin, in the United States
- The Ozaukee Ice Center, a two-sheet ice arena located in Mequon, Wisconsin, in the United States
- The Ozaukee Interurban Trail, or Ozaukee-Sheboygan Interurban Trail, a rail trail in Ozaukee, Sheboygan, and Milwaukee counties, in Wisconsin in the United States
- USS Ozaukee (ID-3439), a United States Navy cargo ship in commission from 1918 to 1919
