= Butte Roughriders =

- City: Butte, Montana
- League: NorPac
- Founded: 2003
- Home arena: Butte Community Ice Center
- Colors: Green, red, white, black, and gold
- General manager: Mike Flink
- Head coach: Chris Shadow
- Media: The Montana Standard

Franchise history
- 2003–2011: Butte Roughriders

The Butte Roughriders were a Tier III Junior A ice hockey team located in Butte, Montana. The team joined the Northern Pacific Hockey League's America West Division in 2003 when the league competed at the Tier III Jr. B level. In 2007 The NorPac was granted Tier III Junior A status by USA Hockey.

In November 2011, it was announced that the Roughriders had withdrawn from NorPac because they were unable to field the minimum number of players required due to injuries and players leaving the team.

The Roughriders played their home games at the Butte Community Ice Center.

== Alumni ==
The team had a few alumni move on to collegiate hockey and higher levels of junior ice hockey, but only had one player of note: Kyle Valentine, a defenseman, who played two seasons at Oakland University (ACHA) in Michigan.
