= Point Mallard Ducks =

- City: Decatur, Alabama
- League: North American 3 Hockey League
- Division: South
- Home arena: Point Mallard Ice Complex
- Colors: Green, blue and white

Franchise history
- 2014–2018: Point Mallard Ducks
- 2018–2023: Milwaukee Power
- 2023–present: West Bend Power

Championships
- Division titles: 1: 2016

The Point Mallard Ducks were a Tier III junior ice hockey team that played in the North American 3 Hockey League. The Power last played their home games at the Kettle Moraine Ice Center in West Bend, Wisconsin.

== History ==
The Point Mallard Ducks were added as an expansion team to the NA3HL in 2014. After four years, the franchise was sold to Local Hockey Partners, LLC and moved to Milwaukee, Wisconsin.

== Season-by-season records ==
| Season | GP | W | L | OTL | SOL | Pts | GF | GA | Regular season finish | Playoffs |
|---|---|---|---|---|---|---|---|---|---|---|
| 2014–15 | 47 | 26 | 19 | 2 | – | 54 | 181 | 140 | 4th of 6, South Div. 17th of 31, NA3HL | Lost Div. Semifinal series, 1–2 (Nashville Jr. Predators) |
| 2015–16 | 47 | 35 | 9 | 3 | – | 73 | 207 | 119 | t–1st of 6, South Div. t–4th of 34, NA3HL | Won Div. Semifinal series, 2–1 (Sugar Land Imperials); Won Div. Finals series, 2–0 (Texas Jr. Brahmas); Lost Group A Round Robin series, 1–2 (Great Falls Americans), 3–0 (Yellowstone Quake), 4–3 (North Iowa Bulls) |
| 2016–17 | 47 | 23 | 22 | 1 | 1 | 48 | 150 | 166 | 4th of 6, South Div. 27th of 48, NA3HL | Lost Div. Semifinal series, 1–2 (Texas Jr. Brahmas) |
| 2017–18 | 47 | 24 | 22 | 0 | 1 | 49 | 202 | 153 | 4th of 6, Central Div. 22nd of 44, NA3HL | Lost Div. Semifinal series, 1–2 (Texas Jr. Brahmas) |
