= Valley Ice Garden =

Multi-purpose arena in Bozeman, Montana

Coordinates: 45°40′34″N 111°11′21″W

The Valley Ice Garden was a 3,500-seat multi-purpose arena in Bozeman, Montana. It was built in 1996. It was home to the Big Sky Thunder of the National Indoor Football League team in 2006.

The arena was sold in May 2006 to Cardinal Distributing of Bozeman, Montana. It closed at the end of August 2006 to be renovated into a cold storage warehouse.

The Ice Garden was home to the NAHL's Bozeman Icedogs, the Bozeman Figure Skating Club, and the Gallatin Valley Hockey Club. The Bozeman Icedogs moved to the Gallatin Ice Facility at the Gallatin County Fairgrounds in August of 2006. BAHA and GVHC joined their youth clubs now at the Gallatin Ice Facility and are now called the "Jr. Icedogs". The facility was also hosts to numerous camps, clinics, tournaments, concerts, trade shows, and other community events throughout the course of the year.
