= Southern Oregon Spartans =

- City: Medford, Oregon
- League: Northern Pacific Hockey League (2007–2012); Western States Hockey League (2012–2020); United States Premier Hockey League (2020)
- Founded: 2007
- Folded: 2020
- Colors: Grey, powderblue, white

Franchise history
- 2007–2010: Rogue Valley Wranglers
- 2010–2020: Southern Oregon Spartans

The Southern Oregon Spartans were a junior ice hockey team that were last members of the United States Premier Hockey League in 2020.

== History ==
On May 25, 2007, it was announced by the Northern Pacific Hockey League (NorPac) that two expansion teams would begin play during the 2007–08 season, the Missoula Maulers and the Rogue Valley Wranglers. When the Wranglers franchise was announced, the NorPac was a Tier III Junior B hockey league. However, on July 17, 2007, it was announced that the league and all its teams would be granted Tier III Junior A status. Also on July 17, the team announced the signing of their first player, Robert Reiber, who was later traded to the Eugene Generals.

After three seasons as the Wranglers, it was announced on February 20, 2010, that the team had been purchased by new ownership, led by Troy Irving and Forest Sexton, and would be re-established as the Southern Oregon Spartans. The new ownership confirmed that Steve Chelios would be hired on as the general manager and head coach of the team. The team played that evening for the first time as the Spartans and revealed the new team and logo to a crowd of over 900 fans from throughout Southern Oregon.

Starting in the 2012–13 season, the Spartans joined the AAU-sanctioned Western States Hockey League (WSHL) and played out of the Northwest Division. In 2019, the Spartans' management posted the franchise was for sale. The team was then sold to Dylan and Brie Martin in June 2019.

In 2020, the Spartans left the WSHL and joined another independent junior hockey league, the United States Premier Hockey League (USPHL), in the Premier Division. Due to local capacity restrictions on indoor events amidst the COVID-19 pandemic, the Spartans began their 2020–21 season playing in outdoor rinks with limited attendance. As restrictions increased, the team withdrew from the 2020–21 season after six games played on November 18, 2020. Their home arena, The RRRink, then opted to not renew their lease with the Spartans in May 2021 and begin seeking a new junior hockey tenant.

== Season-by-season records ==
Season	GP	W	L	OTW	OTL	SOL	Pts	GF	GA	PIM	Finish	Playoffs
Rogue Valley Wranglers
2007–08	48	3	45	—	—	—	6	130	443	1,942	7th of 7, Pacific; 13th of 13 NorPac	Did not qualify
2008–09	48	1	47	—	—	—	2	80	376	1,249	7th of 7, Pacific; 13th of 13, NorPac	Did not qualify
2009–10	48	8	40	—	—	—	16	127	181	1,385	6th of 6, Pacific; 12th of 12, NorPac	Did not qualify
Southern Oregon Spartans
2010–11	50	36	14	—	—	—	72	280	149	1,668	2nd of 6, Pacific; 3rd of 11, NorPac	Won Div. Semifinals, 3–1 vs. Eugene Generals; Lost Div. Finals, 0–3 vs. Seattle Totems
2011–12	42	34	8	—	—	—	68	260	162	1,864	2nd of 7, NorPac	Won Semifinals, 3–1 vs. Yellowstone Quake; Won Finals, 3–0 vs. Seattle Totems; CASCADE CUP CHAMPIONS
2012–13	46	26	19	—	1	0	53	172	172	1,758	2nd of 5, Northwest; 8th of 22, WSHL	Won Div. Semifinals, 2–1 vs. Ogden Mustangs; Lost Div. Finals, 0–2 vs. Idaho Jr. Steelheads; 1–1 in Thorne Cup Round Robin (wild card) (L, 1–10 vs. Jr. Steelheads; W, 4–2 vs. Ice Jets); Lost Semifinal game, 1–3 vs. Idaho Jr. Steelheads
2013–14	46	12	30	—	2	2	28	141	209	1,003	5th of 6, Northwest; 18th of 24, WSHL	Did not qualify
2014–15	46	34	11	—	1	0	79	229	120	1,575	3rd of 7, Northwest; 6th of 28, WSHL	Won Div. Quarterfinals, 2–0 vs. Seattle Totems; Lost Div. Semifinals, 1–2 vs. Missoula Maulers
2015–16	52	33	18	—	1	—	67	227	184	1,395	3rd of 8, Northwest; 10th of 29, WSHL	Won Div. Quarterfinals, 2–0 vs. Seattle Totems; Lost Div. Semifinals, 0–2 vs. Missoula Maulers
2016–17	52	33	15	—	4	—	70	205	124	1,193	2nd of 7, Northwest; 10th of 27, WSHL	Div. Quarterfinals, Bye; Lost Div. Semifinals, 0–2 vs. Butte Cobras
2017–18	51	12	38	—	1	—	25	147	253	1,514	6th of 6, Northwest; 20th of 23, WSHL	Lost Div. Quarterfinals, 0–2 vs. Bellingham Blazers
2018–19	51	18	29	2	2	—	60 (Note: Beginning with the 2018–19 season, the WSHL began awarding 3pts for a win, 2pts for an overtime win, and 1pt for an overtime loss.)	214	216	1,197	3rd of 4, Northwest; 14th of 23, WSHL	Lost Div. Semifinals, 0–2 vs. Bellingham Blazers
2019–20	50	6	41	2	1	—	23	101	361	1,030	5th of 5, Northwest; 19th of 20, WSHL	Did not qualify
2020–21	6	0	6	0	0	0	0	9	61	145	5th of 5, Pacific; 61st of 61, USPHL Premier	Did not finish
