= West Bend Power =

- City: West Bend, Wisconsin
- League: North American 3 Hockey League
- Division: Central
- Founded: 2014
- Home arena: Kettle Moraine Ice Center
- Colors: Blue, black and white
- Owners: West Bend Hockey Club, LLC.
- General manager: Jeremy Ebert
- Head coach: Jason Woods

Franchise history
- 2014–2018: Point Mallard Ducks
- 2018–2023: Milwaukee Power
- 2023–present: West Bend Power

Championships
- Division titles: 1: 2025

The West Bend Power are a Tier III junior ice hockey team playing in the North American 3 Hockey League. The Power play their home games at the Kettle Moraine Ice Center in West Bend, Wisconsin.

== History ==
On August 9, 2023, the NA3HL announced that the Milwaukee Power had been sold to West Bend Hockey Club, LLC. The team was subsequently moved to West Bend, Wisconsin and renamed as the West Bend Power.

== Season-by-season records ==
Season	GP	W	L	OTL	SOL	Pts	GF	GA	Regular season finish	Playoffs
2023–24	47	32	12	1	2	67	166	124	2nd of 6, Central Div. 8th of 34, NA3HL	Won Div. Semifinal series, 2–1 (Oregon Tradesmen); Won Div. Finals series, 2–0 (Wausau Cyclones); Lost Pool A Round Robin Quarterfinal, 2–4 (Granite City Lumberjacks), 1–5 (Gillette Wild)
2024–25	47	35	8	2	2	74	194	109	1st of 6, Central Div. 6th of 35, NA3HL	Won Div. Semifinal series, 2–1 (Wisconsin Woodsmen); Won Div. Finals series, 2–1 (Rochester Grizzlies); Won Pool A Round Robin Quarterfinal, 2–1 (Helena Bighorns), 4–3 (OT) (New Mexico Ice Wolves); Won Semifinal, 2–0 (Granite City Lumberjacks); Lost Championship, 1–5 (Louisiana Drillers)
2025–26	47	41	3	2	1	85	250	108	1st of 6, Central Div. 2nd of 38, NA3HL	Won Div. Semifinal series, 2–0 (St. Louis Jr. Blues); Lost Div. Finals series, 1-2 (Rochester Grizzlies)
