= American West Hockey League =

American ice hockey league

- Current season, competition or edition: 2013–14 AWHL season
- Sport: Ice Hockey
- Founded: 2011
- First season: 2011-12
- CEO: Garry Swain
- No. of teams: 7
- Country: United States
- Most recent champion: Helena Bighorns (2nd)
- Most titles: Helena Bighorns (2)
- Website: theawhl.com

The American West Hockey League (AWHL) was an American Tier III Junior ice hockey league based in Montana and Wyoming. The league was a member of USA Hockey and was founded in 2011. The AWHL merged into the NA3HL in March 2014.

== History ==
The AWHL was formed in the summer of 2011 by teams breaking away from the Northern Pacific Hockey League (NorPac). The league shares a similar area as the former America West Hockey League that merged into the North American Hockey League in 2003. Bozeman, Billings, Great Falls, and Helena all had teams in the old AWHL.

In 2012, the AWHL welcomed the Yellowstone Quake from Cody, Wyoming, to the league. The Quake was previously a member of the NorPac and began play in the AWHL for the 2012–13 season. In February 2013 it was announced the Glacier Nationals from Whitefish, Montana were accepted in the AWHL for the 2013-2014 season. The Nationals, another former member of the NorPac, had played a split schedule with the NorPac and the AWHL for the 2012–13 season. The Nationals would join the AWHL as a full-time member in 2013–14.

In April 2013 the Missoula Maulers announced that they will be leaving the AWHL and joining the Western States Hockey League for the 2013–14 hockey season.

In March 2014, the North American 3 Hockey League (NA3HL) announced that the AWHL would merge into the league as the new Frontier Division.

== 2013-14 teams ==
| Team | Joined | City | Arena |
|---|---|---|---|
| Billings Bulls | 2011 | Billings, MT | Centennial Ice Arena |
| Bozeman Icedogs | 2011 | Bozeman, MT | Haynes Pavilion |
| Gillette Wild | 2011 | Gillette, WY | Campbell County Ice Arena |
| Great Falls Americans | 2011 | Great Falls, MT | Great Falls IcePlex |
| Helena Bighorns | 2011 | Helena, MT | Helena Ice Arena |
| Yellowstone Quake | 2012 | Cody, WY | Victor Riley Arena |
| Glacier Nationals | 2013 | Whitefish, MT | Stumptown Ice Den |

== Former teams ==
| Team | Joined | Left | New League | City | Arena |
|---|---|---|---|---|---|
| Missoula Maulers | 2011 | 2013 | WSHL | Missoula, MT | Glacier Ice Rink |

== Past champions ==
- 2011-12 Helena Bighorns
- 2012-13 Helena Bighorns
