= Brian Lee (ice hockey, born 1987) =

American ice hockey player (born 1987)

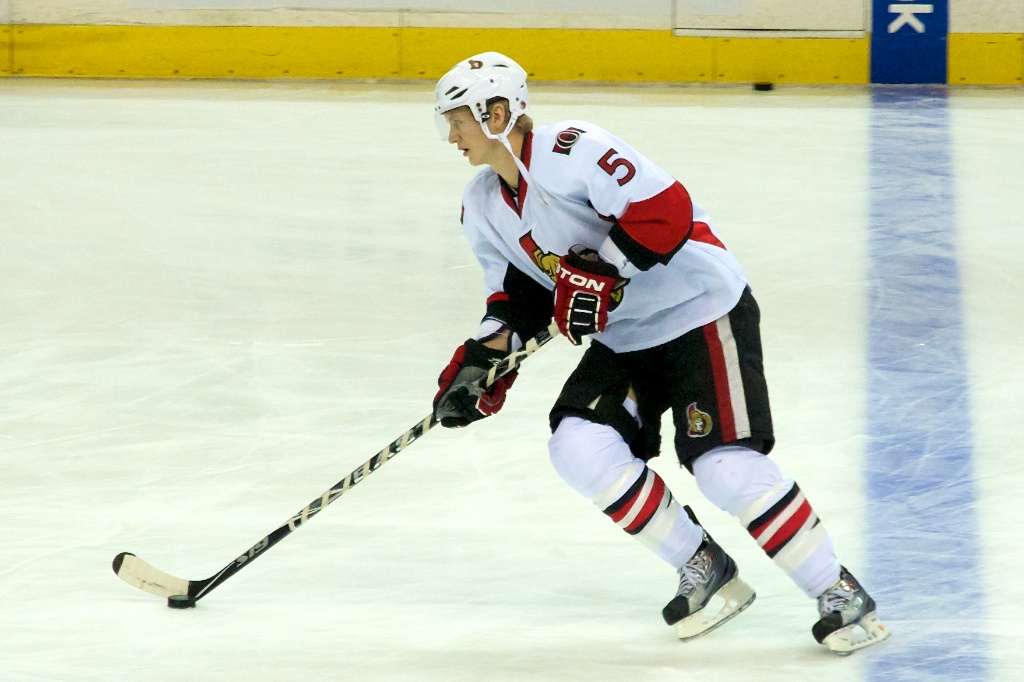
- Lee with the Ottawa Senators in 2011
- Born: March 26, 1987 (age 39) Moorhead, Minnesota, U.S.
- Height: 6 ft 2 in (188 cm)
- Weight: 205 lb (93 kg; 14 st 9 lb)
- Position: Defense
- Shot: Right
- Played for: Ottawa Senators; Tampa Bay Lightning
- National team: United States
- NHL draft: 9th overall, 2005; Ottawa Senators
- Playing career: 2007–2013

Brian Lee (born March 26, 1987) is an American former professional ice hockey player. Lee played in the National Hockey League with the Ottawa Senators, who drafted him in the first round, ninth overall in the 2005 NHL entry draft, and the Tampa Bay Lightning. Originally considered one of the top defensive prospects, Lee had a solid NHL career but arguably did not live up to expectations of the 9th overall draft selection, only playing in 209 career NHL games.

== Playing career ==
=== High School and Juniors ===
Brian Lee grew up in Moorhead, Minnesota, and was a stand out player for the Moorhead High School Spuds hockey team.

After his junior year at Moorhead High School, Lee would make his junior hockey debut in 2004 for the Billings Bulls of the North American Hockey League (NAHL), playing in five games.

Returning to Moorhead High School for his senior season in 2005, Lee would have a spectacular year. He was selected as Minnesota's Mr. Hockey as the number one player in Minnesota high school boys hockey. He was also named the Associated Press' Minnesota high school boys hockey Player of the Year.

Lee was one of only two high school players selected to play for Team USA in the 2005 World Junior Ice Hockey Championships, with the other being Phil Kessel of Pioneer High School (Ann Arbor, Michigan) and the USA Hockey National Team Development Program.

Later in 2005, Lee would go on to play junior hockey for the Lincoln Stars of the United States Hockey League (USHL), suiting up in 12 games.

=== College ===
After high school, Lee chose to attend the University of North Dakota (UND) and played for the Fighting Sioux in the NCAA for two seasons. Lee would also play for the USA at the 2006 World Junior Ice Hockey Championships.

=== Ottawa Senators ===
Before Lee played in his freshman season at the University of North Dakota, the Ottawa Senators drafted Lee in the first round, 9th overall, in the 2005 NHL entry draft. After two seasons at UND, Ottawa assigned him to their AHL affiliate, the Binghamton Senators, after training camp. Lee made his professional hockey debut in the 2007–08 AHL season. Lee would go on to make the AHL All-Star Game roster that season.

Lee made his NHL regular season debut on March 25, 2008, against the Buffalo Sabres at HSBC Arena in a 6–3 win for Ottawa.

Lee played in 6 games with Ottawa in 2007–08 and in 5 games in 2008–09 before being reassigned to Binghamton for development on October 22, 2008. He was later recalled and finished the season with Ottawa, recording 13 points in 53 NHL games and assuming a more defensive role.

Following training camp for the 2009–10 season, Lee was once again assigned to Binghamton, while AHL veteran Matt Carkner and newcomer Erik Karlsson remained with Ottawa. Lee's agent stated that Lee was "shocked and surprised that he's not among Ottawa's top-six defencemen."

=== Tampa Bay Lightning ===
On February 27, 2012, Lee was traded by the Senators to the Tampa Bay Lightning for Matt Gilroy. In the following 2012–13 season, on May 17, 2013, while playing with the Syracuse Crunch during the American Hockey League Eastern Conference semifinals against the Springfield Falcons, Lee suffered a torn anterior cruciate ligament which required surgery, and he opened the 2013–14 NHL season on Tampa Bay's long-term injured reserve list. Lee was not re-signed by the Lightning at the end of his contract and became an unrestricted free agent. Lee played a total of 209 NHL games with the Ottawa Senators and the Tampa Bay Lightning. During that time he scored 5 goals and had 31 assists.

=== Nashville Predators ===
Just prior to the 2013-2014 season, Lee would be invited to training camp with the Nashville Predators on a Professional Tryout Agreement (PTO), but was released prior to the end of camp, once again making him a free agent.

At the end of training camp, Lee stated that he felt good overall, but that he had experienced some discomfort in the same knee that had twice been surgically repaired. This led to delays in his return to hockey.

=== Retirement ===
On December 12, 2014, Lee announced his retirement from professional hockey. Lee stated that he was planning on studying nursing at North Dakota State University in Fargo, North Dakota - just across the Red River from his hometown of Moorhead, Minnesota - and then returning to the University of North Dakota to enroll in the Certified Registered Nurse Anesthetist program offered there. Lee stated that he still wanted to be around hockey and was looking forward to being able to give back to the community.

== Post hockey career ==
Lee would go on to graduate from North Dakota State University in 2017 with a bachelor's degree in University Studies. He currently works for an orthopedic device manufacturing company, specializing in distal extremities.

== Personal information ==
Brian's brother, John, played NCAA Division I ice hockey with the University of Denver. John was selected by the Florida Panthers in the 5th round (131st overall) of the 2007 NHL entry draft.

== Career statistics ==
=== Regular season and playoffs ===
			Regular season					Playoffs
Season	Team	League	GP	G	A	Pts	PIM	GP	G	A	Pts	PIM
2003–04	Moorhead High School	HS-MN	29	10	38	48	—	—	—	—	—	—
2003–04	Billings Bulls	NAHL	5	0	0	0	2	—	—	—	—	—
2004–05	Moorhead High School	HS-MN	25	12	26	38	—	—	—	—	—	—
2004–05	Lincoln Stars	USHL	12	0	3	3	4	4	2	3	5	2
2005–06	University of North Dakota	WCHA	44	4	23	27	44	—	—	—	—	—
2006–07	University of North Dakota	WCHA	38	2	24	26	69	—	—	—	—	—
2007–08	Binghamton Senators	AHL	55	3	22	25	51	—	—	—	—	—
2007–08	Ottawa Senators	NHL	6	0	1	1	4	4	0	0	0	2
2008–09	Binghamton Senators	AHL	27	2	10	12	41	—	—	—	—	—
2008–09	Ottawa Senators	NHL	53	2	11	13	33	—	—	—	—	—
2009–10	Binghamton Senators	AHL	41	3	12	15	52	—	—	—	—	—
2009–10	Ottawa Senators	NHL	23	2	1	3	12	—	—	—	—	—
2010–11	Ottawa Senators	NHL	50	0	3	3	24	—	—	—	—	—
2011–12	Ottawa Senators	NHL	35	1	7	8	27	—	—	—	—	—
2011–12	Tampa Bay Lightning	NHL	20	0	8	8	8	—	—	—	—	—
2012–13	Tampa Bay Lightning	NHL	22	0	0	0	16	—	—	—	—	—
2012–13	Syracuse Crunch	AHL	11	0	1	1	25	7	0	0	0	0
AHL totals			134	8	45	53	169	7	0	0	0	0
NHL totals			209	5	31	36	124	4	0	0	0	2

=== International ===
Medal record

Representing United States

Men's ice hockey

World Junior Championships
Bronze medal – third place	2007 Mora	

Year	Team	Event	Result	GP	G	A	Pts	PIM
2005	United States	WJC	4th	7	0	0	0	4
2006	United States	WJC	4th	7	1	0	1	8
2007	United States	WJC	3rd place, bronze medalist(s)	7	0	0	0	14
Junior totals				21	1	0	1	26

== Awards and honors ==
Award	Year
All-WCHA Rookie Team	2005–06

Awards and achievements
Preceded by Tom Gorowsky	Minnesota Mr. Hockey; 2004–05	Succeeded by David Fischer
Sporting positions
Preceded by Andrej Meszaros	Ottawa Senators first-round draft pick 2005	Succeeded by Nick Foligno
