= Northwest Hockey League =

The Northwest Hockey League is a defunct senior amateur ice hockey league. It was only in operation for the 1975-76 season.

The league comprised seven teams:

- Abbotsford Coppertones, (Abbotsford, British Columbia)
- British Columbia Braves, (British Columbia)
- Burnaby Lakers, (Burnaby, British Columbia)
- North Shore Hurry Kings, (Delta, British Columbia)
- Portland Buckaroos, (Portland, Oregon)
- Richmond Redwings, (Richmond, British Columbia)
- Simon Fraser Clansmen, (British Columbia)
