= Seattle Totems (junior hockey) =

- City: Mountlake Terrace, Washington
- League: USPHL
- Division: North West
- Founded: 2005
- Home arena: Olympic View Arena
- Colors: Kelly green, black, and white
- Owner: Gordon Whitaker
- General manager: Mike Murphy
- Head coach: Mike Murphy

Franchise history
- 2005–2006: Kent Crusaders
- 2006–present: Seattle Jr. Totems

The Seattle Totems are a junior ice hockey team in Seattle, Washington. They are a member of the United States Premier Hockey League and play their home games at Olympic View Arena in Mountlake Terrace, Washington.

== History ==
The franchise was founded in 2005 as the Kent Crusaders in the Northern Pacific Hockey League (NorPac). After one season the team was sold to another local youth hockey organization and was renamed after the former local professional team, the Seattle Totems.

Seattle finished the 2007–08 regular season first place overall in the NorPac and are three time Pacific Division Champions- 2007–08, 2008–09, and 2009–10.

Prior to the start of the 2012–13 season, the Totems joined the Western States Hockey League (WSHL), an AAU sanctioned league. The 2019–20 postseason was cancelled amidst the COVID-19 pandemic and the 2020–21 WSHL was subsequently cancelled. The Totems were scheduled to return to play in the 2021–22 season with the rest of the WSHL, but the Northwest Division then placed in dormancy prior to playing any games. After the rest of the WSHL ceased operations during the 2021–22 season, the Totems franchise joined the Premier Division of the United States Premier Hockey League (USPHL), another independent junior league.

== Season-by-season records ==
Season	GP	W	L	OTW	OTL	PTS	GF	GA	PIM	Finish	Playoffs
2012–13	46	13	26	—	7	33	117	176	1401	4th of 5, Northwest; 18th of 22, WSHL	Lost Div. Semifinals, 0–2 vs. Idaho Jr. Steelheads
2013–14	46	11	31	—	4	26	119	235	1283	6th of 6, Northwest; 20th of 24, WSHL	Did not qualify
2014–15	46	10	34	—	2	22	128	281	753	6th of 7, Northwest; 24th of 28, WSHL	Lost Div. Quarterfinals, 0–2 vs. Southern Oregon Spartans
2015–16	52	13	31	—	8	34	160	270	1188	6th of 8, Northwest; 24th of 29, WSHL	Lost Div. Quarterfinals, 0–2 vs. Southern Oregon Spartans
2016–17	52	12	36	—	4	28	146	277	1285	7th of 7, Northwest; 23rd of 27, WSHL	Did not qualify
2017–18	51	13	32	—	6	32	159	321	1032	5th of 6, Northwest; 18th of 23, WSHL	Lost Div. Quarterfinals, 0–2 vs. West Sound Warriors
2018–19	51	34	14	1	2	106 (Note: Beginning with the 2018–19 season, the WSHL began awarding 3pts for a win, 2pts for an overtime win, and 1pt for an overtime loss.)	285	194	1240	1st of 4, Northwest; 6th of 23, WSHL	West Sound Admirals forfeit Div. Semifinals; Lost Div. Finals, 1–2 vs. Bellingham Blazers
2019–20	49	21	24	3	1	70	164	172	1067	3rd of 5, Northwest; 13th of 20, WSHL	Playoffs cancelled (Note: Seattle was removed from the playoffs prior to the end of the regular season due to the COVID-19 pandemic; the entire WSHL playoffs were eventually cancelled.)
USPHL Premier
2022–23	42	25	14	2	1	53	196	165	767	2nd of 5, Northwest; 28th of 70, Premier	Won Div. Semifinal series, 2–1 (Rock Springs Prospectors); Lost Div. Final series, 1–2 (Vernal Oilers)
2023–24	44	28	14	1	1	58	190	131	862	2nd of 5, Northwest; 22nd of 61, Premier	Won Div. Semifinal series, 2–0 (Casper Roughnecks); Lost Div. Final series, 1–2 (Vernal Oilers)
2024–25	44	40	4	0	0	80	349	70	642	2nd of 7, Northwest; 2nd of 73, Premier	Won Div. Semifinal series, 2–0 (Bellingham Blazers); Lost Div. Final series, 0–2 (Vernal Oilers)
2025–26	44	35	8	0	1	71	296	88	1209	2nd of 7, Northwest; 2nd of 73, Premier	Won Div. Semifinal series, 2–0 (Bremerton Sockeyes); Lost Div. Final series, 0–2 (Vernal Oilers)
Syracuse Lightning

== Alumni ==
The Jr. Totems have had a number of alumni move on to NCAA Division I, NCAA Division III, and higher levels of junior ice hockey and the NHL.
