= Tri-City Titans (NPHL) =

- City: Kennewick, Washington
- League: NorPac
- Division: Pacific
- Founded: 2001
- Home arena: Toyota Arena
- Colors: Black and Gold
- Owner(s): Tri City Titans LLC
- General manager: Rodger Hisaw
- Head coach: Greg Sponholtz

Franchise history
- 2001–2010: Tri-City Titans

The Tri-City Titans were a USA Hockey-sanctioned Tier III Junior A ice hockey team playing in the Pacific Division of the Northern Pacific Hockey League (NorPac). The league helps 16 to 20-year-old players develop hockey skills in a professional environment while maintaining their amateur status for college eligibility. The team played their home games at the Toyota Arena in Kennewick, Washington, a city in the Tri-Cities area.

The franchise joined the NorPac in 2001 when the league was Tier III Junior B status until 2007 when the league and member teams were granted Tier III Junior A status by USA Hockey, the governing body for ice hockey in the United States. The team ceased operations at the end of the 2009–10 season. In 2012, Kennewick was awarded an expansion team to replace the Titans called the Tri-City Outlaws in the NorPac.

== Alumni ==
The Titans had a few alumni move on to collegiate programs and higher levels of junior ice hockey in the United States and Canada.
