= Bozeman Icedogs =

- City: Bozeman, Montana
- League: NA3HL
- Division: Frontier
- Founded: 1996 (In the AFHL)
- Home arena: Haynes Pavilion
- Colors: Maroon, white, black, silver
- General manager: Mike Perkins
- Head coach: Mike Perkins
- Media: Bozeman Daily Chronicle
- Website: bozemanicedogs.com

Franchise history
- 1996–present: Bozeman Icedogs

The Bozeman Icedogs are a Tier III Junior ice hockey team located in Bozeman, Montana. The team is a member of the North American 3 Hockey League (NA3HL). The Icedogs play home games at the Haynes Pavilion run by Gallatin Ice Foundation located at the Gallatin County Fairgrounds.

== History ==
Founded in 1996 by a Michigan-based investment group, the Icedogs played in the Tier II Junior A American Frontier Hockey League (AFHL) from 1996 to 1998. The Icedogs were forced to play their entire first season on the road when the ownership team’s funding fell short with their rink only half-built. Despite the circumstances, which left them practicing at times outdoors and playing all ‘home’ games in Helena, Montana, the Icedogs, coached by David “Smoke” Cole and captained by Brad Michalski, earned a .500 record and a position in the AFHL playoffs. Forward Kevin Wesolek set a league record for single-season scoring as he captured 1996–97 Rookie of the Year honors.

In the fall of 1997, the Icedogs moved into the brand new Valley Ice Garden, a state-of-the-art, 3,500-seat arena outside Bozeman. Bill Martel, owner of the Bozeman construction firm that had been building the facility, took over ownership of both the team and the arena, providing the Gallatin Valley with its first indoor ice skating facility. The rink opened to the public with an open house on September 14, 1997.

The Icedogs played their first game at the Valley Ice Garden on September 30, 1997, a 6-4 victory over the Butte Irish in front of a sellout crowd with Wesolek scoring the team’s first goal. The Icedogs went on to record sixteen- and seven-game unbeaten streaks while selling out nearly every game en route to a second-place finish in the AFHL. Bozeman fell to in-state rival Billings Bulls in six games in the Borne Cup Finals, but earned a berth in the Gold Cup National Championship Tournament, where they were eliminated in the first round of round robin play. Wesolek finished second in the AFHL in scoring and set a league record for career scoring, with 198 points over two seasons.

In 1998, the AFHL changed its name to the America West Hockey League (AWHL). The 1998–99 season brought less success for the Icedogs, who struggled throughout, and finished in last place in the AWHL, missing the playoffs for the first time. Forward Jimmy Sokol finished second in the league in scoring while linemate Jason Deitsch led the league in points-per-game.

During the 1999–2000 season, Cole was fired and replaced with assistant coach Dale “Duner” Hladun. The team failed to improve under Hladun, who was forced to leave the team due to visa issues and replaced by assistant coach Darren Blue. The Icedogs missed the playoffs for the second consecutive season.

In March 2000, the Bozeman Icedogs hired John LaFontaine, brother of National Hockey League great Pat LaFontaine, as head coach and director of hockey operations. LaFontaine immediately turned the program around, leading the Icedogs to a .500 record and playoff appearance in his first season as coach.

In 2003, the America West Hockey League merged with the North American Hockey League (NAHL) and the Icedogs began playing in the Tier II NAHL.

In the 2005–06 season, goaltender Matt Dalton led the NAHL in saves percentage, setting NAHL records for goals against average and saves percentage. Forward Josh Heidinger led the league in scoring was voted the NAHL’s top forward. After defeating the Fairbanks (Alaska) Ice Dogs for their second Borne Cup title, the Icedogs fell to the Texas Tornado in the final game of the national championship Robertson Cup tournament in May 2006.

Later in May 2006, the Helena Bighorns and Billings Bulls joined the Northern Pacific Hockey League (NorPac). The Valley Ice Garden was sold to a beer distributor and the Tier II Icedogs withdrew from the league. The team was able to secure a new home venue when they signed a lease with the Haynes Pavilion that summer. This had the side effect of displacing the Bozeman Blackhawks as the Icedogs took not only their home rink but their spot in the NorPac as well. In 2007, the NorPac was promoted from Tier III Junior B to Junior A.

In 2007 the Icedogs moved to the Gallatin Ice Facility run by Gallatin Ice Foundation at the Gallatin County Fairgrounds in Bozeman, Montana following the closure of the Valley Ice Garden in 2006.

In 2011, the Icedogs joined the other eastern teams of the NorPac and created a new American West Hockey League made up of teams in Montana and Wyoming. In March 2014, the new AWHL joined the North American 3 Hockey League (NA3HL) as the Frontier Division in the 2014–15 season.

The Icedogs were sold after the 2012–13 season to a local couple Alec and Kate Nisbet. The Icedogs and the entire league moved from the AWHL and joined the NA3HL after the 2013–14 season and became the Frontier Division.

The Icedogs changed hands again in 2018, sold to the Paine Group led by Head Coach and GM Mike Perkins.

=== Previous leagues ===
- 1996–1998 American Frontier Hockey League
- 1998–2003 America West Hockey League
- 2003–2006 North American Hockey League
- 2006–2011 Northern Pacific Hockey League
- 2011–2014 American West Hockey League
- 2014–present North American 3 Hockey League

== Season-by-season records ==
| Season | GP | W | L | OTL | Pts | GF | GA | PIM | Regular season finish | Playoffs |
|---|---|---|---|---|---|---|---|---|---|---|
American West Hockey League
| 2011–12 | 48 | 14 | 34 | 0 | 28 | 131 | 207 | — | 5th of 6, AWHL | Did not qualify |
| 2012–13 | 48 | 1 | 47 | 0 | 2 | 72 | 376 | — | 7th of 7, AWHL | Did not qualify |
| 2013–14 | 48 | 5 | 39 | 4 | 14 | 113 | 265 | — | 7th of 7, AWHL | Did not qualify |
North American 3 Hockey League
| 2014–15 | 47 | 15 | 31 | 1 | 31 | 119 | 193 | 990 | 5th of 7, Frontier Div. 23rd of 31, NA3HL | Did not qualify |
| 2015–16 | 47 | 29 | 11 | 7 | 65 | 191 | 134 | 911 | 3rd of 7, Frontier Div. 12th of 34, NA3HL | Lost Div. Semifinals, 0–2 vs. Great Falls Americans |
| 2016–17 | 47 | 24 | 21 | 2 | 50 | 174 | 168 | 1412 | 5th of 8, Frontier Div. 23rd of 48, NA3HL | Won Div. Quarterfinals, 2–0 vs. Missoula Jr. Bruins; Lost Div. Semifinals, 0–2 vs. Yellowstone Quake |
| 2017–18 | 47 | 5 | 41 | 1 | 11 | 104 | 289 | 867 | 6th of 6, Frontier Div. 41st of 42, NA3HL | Did not qualify |
| 2018–19 | 47 | 28 | 15 | 4 | 60 | 197 | 136 | 851 | 3rd of 7, Frontier Div. 15th of 36, NA3HL | Lost Div. Semifinals, 1–2 vs. Great Falls Americans |
| 2019–20 | 47 | 39 | 7 | 1 | 79 | 241 | 119 | 1404 | 1st of 8, Frontier Div. 3rd of 34, NA3HL | Playoffs cancelled |
| 2020–21 | 40 | 13 | 22 | 5 | 31 | 124 | 163 | 1250 | 6th of 8, Frontier Div. 21st of 31, NA3HL | Did not qualify |
| 2021–22 | 47 | 26 | 17 | 4 | 56 | 194 | 183 | 1247 | 3rd of 8, Frontier Div. 16th of 34, NA3HL | Won play-in series, 2–0 vs. Butte Cobras; Lost Div. Semifinals, 0-2 Gillette Wild |
| 2022–23 | 47 | 23 | 23 | 3 | 47 | 151 | 174 | 1258 | 5th of 8, Frontier Div. 20th of 34, NA3HL | Did not qualify |
| 2023–24 | 47 | 30 | 16 | 1 | 61 | 196 | 152 | 1283 | 3rd of 8, Frontier Div. 14th of 34, NA3HL | Lost Div Semifinal 0-2 (Gillette Wild) |
| 2024–25 | 47 | 26 | 18 | 3 | 55 | 185 | 164 | 711 | 5th of 8, Frontier Div. 18th of 35, NA3HL | Did not qualify |
| 2025–26 | 47 | 21 | 24 | 2 | 44 | 156 | 165 | x | 5th of 7, Frontier Div. 24th of 38, NA3HL | Did not qualify |

== Notable Icedogs alumni ==
The Icedogs have had a number of alumni move on to NCAA Division I, Division III, and higher levels of junior ice hockey, and professional ice hockey, including:

- Ryan Carrigan (1996–1999) – Northern Michigan University (NCAA Division I) 2000–2002; Niagara University (NCAA Division I) 2002–2005; Rockford IceHogs (UHL) 2005–2007; Rio Grande Valley Killer Bees (CHL) 2007–2008
- Jason Deitsch (1998–1999) – 2006 UHL Rookie of the Year, assistant captain of Cincinnati Cyclones
- Thomas Hajek (1996–1998) – All-star and team captain of the Philadelphia Wings of the National Lacrosse League
- Matt Dalton (2005-2006) – NAHL MVP (2006), Boston Bruins (2009-2010), Olympian for South Korea (2018)
