= Billings Bulls =

- City: Billings, Montana
- League: NA3HL
- Division: Frontier
- Founded: 1993 (In the AFHL)
- Folded: 2017 (In the NA3HL)
- Home arena: Centennial Ice Arena 2006-2017; First Interstate Arena at MetraPark 1993-2006
- Colors: Blue, red, white, and gold
- Owners: Chris Dunbar; Joe Robilard
- General manager: Cory Thorson
- Head coach: Cory Thorson
- Media: Billings Gazette (Greg Rachac)
- Website: billingsbulls.com

Franchise history
- 1993–2017: Billings Bulls

Championships
- Regular season titles: 5 1993-94, 1996-97, 1997-98, 2002-03, 2003-04
- Gold Cup appearances: 5 1995-96, 1996-97, 1997-98, 1998-99, 2002-03
- Borne Cups: 5 (AFHL/AWHL/NAHL) 1993-94, 1995-96, 1996-97, 1997-98, 1998-99
- Cascade Cups: 0 (NorPac)

The Billings Bulls were a junior ice hockey organization based in Billings, Montana. They most recently played their home games at the 550-seat Centennial Ice Arena and due to the arena's small size, the Bulls frequently sold out their games. From their inception in 1993 until 2006, the Bulls played their home games in the First Interstate Arena at MetraPark which had a max capacity of 8,700 for hockey games, drawing an average of about 3,500 spectators during the peak of the Bulls popularity. However, a negotiating dispute with arena officials and local county commissioners resulted in the team losing its lease before the 2006 season began. The move to the smaller arena then prompted the Bulls to drop from the Tier II Junior A NAHL to the Tier III Junior B Northern Pacific Hockey League (which was later promoted to Tier III Junior A) before moving to the Tier III Junior A NA3HL. The losses in revenue associated with the smaller arena and lower-level leagues proved too much, and the Bulls ultimately folded in 2017 after 24 years.

== History ==
The Bulls joined the American Frontier Hockey League in 1993 which became the America West Hockey League (AWHL) in 1998. The Bulls joined the Tier II Jr. A North American Hockey League in 2003 when the AWHL merged with the NAHL (keeping the NAHL name). The team played in the NAHL from 2003 to 2006 until the team and their rivals, the Bozeman Icedogs and Helena Bighorns, left to join the Northern Pacific Hockey League (NorPac), a regional league in the Pacific Northwest of the United States. When they joined the NorPac, the league was Tier III Junior B but promoted to Tier III Junior A by USA Hockey in 2007. In 2011, the Montana teams in the NorPac left the league to form the new regional American West Hockey League, made up of teams in Montana and Wyoming, including the Bulls. In March 2014, the new AWHL joined the North American 3 Hockey League (NA3HL) as the Frontier Division.

On the opening weekend of the 2017–18 NA3HL season, the Bulls announced they would be going dormant due to lack of players. At the time, the Bulls were the second-oldest organization in the NA3HL, behind only the St. Louis Jr. Blues.

=== Previous leagues ===
- 1993–1998 American Frontier Hockey League
- 1998–2003 America West Hockey League
- 2003–2006 North American Hockey League
- 2006–2011 Northern Pacific Hockey League
- 2011–2014 American West Hockey League
- 2014–2017 North American 3 Hockey League

== Season-by-season records ==
Season	GP	W	L	OTL	Pts	GF	GA	PIM	Regular season finish	Playoffs
North American 3 Hockey League
2014–15	47	25	16	6	56	161	140	610	4th of 7, Frontier Div. 16th of 31, NA3HL	Lost Div. Semifinal, 0–2 vs. Great Falls Americans
2015–16	47	9	32	6	24	121	237	686	6th of 7, Frontier Div. 27th of 34, NA3HL	Did not qualify
2016–17	47	5	41	1	11	104	356	1449	6th of 8, Frontier Div. 46th of 48, NA3HL	Did not qualify

== NHL alumni ==
The franchise developed a number of collegiate and professional players, but only two have played in the NHL

- Chris Holt, G (University of Nebraska-Omaha, last with the Braehead Clan of the EIHL, formerly of the New York Rangers and St. Louis Blues.)
- Brian Lee, D (last with the Tampa Bay Lightning and originally of the Ottawa Senators.)

== Other notable alumni with professional or NCAA experience ==
- Jon Booras, F (Lake Superior State University, last with MAC Budapest of the MOL Liga)
- Jacob Doty, F (Montana native who spent time in the Saint Louis Blues organization—although never played in a regular season NHL game—currently with the Ontario Reign of the AHL)
- Brad Gorham, D (University of Alaska Anchorage, last with the Alaska Aces of the ECHL)
- Trevor Hammer, D (University of North Dakota, last with the Florida Seals of the SPHL)
- Jeff Hazelwood, F (last with the Las Vegas Wranglers of the ECHL)
- Jordan Hines, F (University of Findlay, last with the Fort Worth Fire of the CHL)
- Dan Knapp, D (University of Nebraska-Omaha, last with the Ontario Reign of the ECHL)
- Mathias Lange, G (Rensselaer Polytechnic Institute—or RPI, last with the Iserlohn Roosters of the Deutsche Eishockey Liga. Current assistant coach for Rensselaer Polytechnic Institute men’s ice hockey.)
- Tom Reimann, D (University of Maine, last with the Colorado Eagles of the CHL)
- Cam Strong, F (Dartmouth College, last with the Utah Grizzlies of the ECHL))
- Zach Tarkir, D (Northern Michigan University, last with IF Troja/Ljungby of HockeyAllsvenskan)
- Kevin Ulanski, C (University of Denver, last with the Colorado Eagles of the CHL.
