= River City Jaguars =

- City: Vancouver, Washington
- League: NorPac
- Division: Pacific
- Founded: 2004
- Home arena: Mountain View Ice Arena
- Colors: Green, Black, & Yellow
- Owner(s): John McBride / John Cosgrave
- General manager: Mike Collins
- Affiliates: Tri-City Storm (USHL); Alaska Avalanche (NAHL); Coquitlam Express (BCHL)

Franchise history
- 2004–2011: River City Jaguars
- 2011–2012: Vancouver Victory
- 2012–2013: Vancouver Vipers
- 2013–2014: Fort Vancouver Vipers

The River City Jaguars were a USA Hockey-sanctioned Tier III Junior A ice hockey team playing in the Northern Pacific Hockey League (NorPac).

== History ==
The franchise joined the NorPac in 2004 when the league was a Jr. B league. They originally played at Valley Ice Arena in Beaverton, Oregon. In 2007 the league and member teams were granted Tier III Jr. A status by USA Hockey, the governing body for ice hockey in the United States.

In 2010, the Jaguars began playing out of the Mountain View Ice Arena in Vancouver, Washington. After one season in Vancouver, the Jaguars were renamed and became the Vancouver Victory. The next season the Victory renamed again to Vancouver Vipers and then in 2013 became the Fort Vancouver Vipers.

On October 14, 2014, the Fort Vancouver Vipers Hockey Club ceased all operations due to an insufficient number of players and a recent increase in player injuries.

== Alumni ==
The NorPac was for 16 to 20-year-old player development in a professional environment while maintaining their amateur status for college eligibility. The Jaguars franchise has had a number of alumni move on to collegiate programs and higher levels of junior ice hockey in the United States and Canada.

On November 27, 2005, Jaguars player, Jonathan Medina from California, died in an accident. In honor of Medina, the Jaguars retired his jersey and number.

On April 13, 2010, the franchise saw its first alumnus sign with an NHL team when Jake Newton signed a three-year entry-level contract with the Anaheim Ducks.

== Team affiliates ==
The River City Jaguars had been affiliated with the Tier II Alaska Avalanche of the North American Hockey League and the Tier I Tri-City Storm of the United States Hockey League to further player growth and development.

In 2012, the Vancouver Vipers affiliated with the Canadian Junior A Coquitlam Express of the British Columbia Hockey League which they maintained until ceasing operations in 2014.
