= America West Hockey League =

The America West Hockey League (AWHL) was a Tier II Junior A ice hockey league. The AWHL was formed in 1992 to offer junior ice hockey to the Rocky Mountain region of USA Hockey. It originally was called the American Frontier Hockey League (AFHL), and the name change to AWHL came in 1998. The AWHL merged with the North American Hockey League in 2003 and after the merger, the NAHL name was kept.

In the Summer of 2011, a new league called the American West Hockey League was formed in the same region as the former AWHL operating as a Tier III league. The new AWHL featured 6 teams, including the former AWHL teams Billings Bulls, Bozeman Icedogs, Great Falls Americans, and Helena Bighorns. The new AWHL would later be merged into the North American 3 Hockey League as the Frontier Division.

== Teams ==
Billings Bulls – (Billings, MT) 1993–2003; merged into NAHL
Bismarck Bullets – (Bismarck, ND) 1993–94
Bismarck Bobcats – (Bismarck, ND) 1997–2003; merged into NAHL
Bozeman Icedogs – (Bozeman, MT) 1996–2003; merged into NAHL
Butte Irish – (Butte, MT) 1996–2002; relocated to Wichita Falls as the Rustlers
Central Texas Blackhawks – (Belton, TX) 2002–03; merged into NAHL
Central Wyoming Outlaws – (Casper, WY) 1993–98; known as Casper Outlaws from 1993–95
Fairbanks Ice Dogs – (Fairbanks, AK) 2000–03; joined from NorPac; merged into NAHL
Fernie Ghostriders – (Fernie, BC) 1999–2003; joined from KIJHL; merged into NAHL
Great Falls Americans – (Great Falls, MT) 1994–2003; known as Kings Americans 1994–95
Helena Bighorns – (Helena, MT) 2001–03; merged into NAHL
Helena Gold Rush – (Helena, MT) 1994–2000; known as Helena Ice Pirates from 1994–99
Jackson Hole Grizzlies – (Jackson, WY) 1993–97
Kimberley Dynamiters – (Kimberley, BC) 1999–2001; joined from and later returned to KIJHL
Minot Muskies – (Minot, ND) 2000–01
Phoenix Polar Bears – (Chandler, AZ) 2002–03; a member of the Western States Hockey League used for 12 interleague games to fill out the South Division schedule
Pikes Peak Miners – (Colorado Springs, CO) 1993–94
Pueblo Venom – (Pueblo, CO) 1993–95; known as Pueblo Flames in 1993–94
Tupelo T-Rex – (Tupelo, MS) 2001–03
Vail Avalanche – (Vail, CO) 1993–96; relocated to Butte as the Irish
Wichita Falls Rustlers – (Wichita Falls, TX) 2002–03; merged into NAHL

=== Expansion ===
Year	Teams	Expansion	Defunct	Relocated	Name Changes
1993–94	Billings Bulls; Bismarck Bullets; Casper Wranglers; Jackson Hole Grizzlies; Ogden Blades; Pikes Peak Miners; Pueblo Flames; Vail Avalanche				
1994–95	Billings Bulls; Casper Wranglers; Helena Ice Pirates; Jackson Hole Grizzlies; Kings Americans; Pueblo Venom; Vail Avalanche	Helena Ice Pirates; Kings Americans	Bismarck Bullets; Ogden Blades; Pikes Peak Miners		Pueblo Flames → Pueblo Venom
1995–96	Billings Bulls; Central Wyoming Outlaws; Great Falls Americans; Helena Ice Pirates; Jackson Hole Grizzlies; Vail Avalanche		Pueblo Venom		Casper Wranglers → Central Wyoming Outlaws; Kings Americans → Great Falls Americans
1996–97	Billings Bulls; Bozeman IceDogs; Butte Irish; Central Wyoming Outlaws; Great Falls Americans; Helena Ice Pirates; Jackson Hole Grizzlies	Bozeman IceDogs		Vail Avalanche → Butte Irish	
1997–98	Billings Bulls; Bismarck Bobcats; Bozeman IceDogs; Butte Irish; Central Wyoming Outlaws; Great Falls Americans; Helena Ice Pirates	Bismarck Bobcats	Jackson Hole Grizzlies		
1998–99	Billings Bulls; Bismarck Bobcats; Bozeman IceDogs; Butte Irish; Great Falls Americans; Helena Ice Pirates		Central Wyoming Outlaws		
1999–2000	Billings Bulls; Bismarck Bobcats; Bozeman IceDogs; Butte Irish; Fernie Ghostriders; Great Falls Americans; Helena Gold Rush; Kimberley Dynamiters	Fernie Ghostriders; Kimberley Dynamiters			Helena Ice Pirates → Helena Gold Rush
2000–01	Billings Bulls; Bismarck Bobcats; Bozeman IceDogs; Butte Irish; Fairbanks Ice Dogs; Fernie Ghostriders; Great Falls Americans; Kimberley Dynamiters; Minot Muskies	Fairbanks Ice Dogs; Minot Muskies	Helena Gold Rush		
2001–02	Billings Bulls; Bismarck Bobcats; Bozeman IceDogs; Butte Irish; Fairbanks Ice Dogs; Fernie Ghostriders; Great Falls Americans; Helena Bighorns; Tupelo T-Rex	Helena Bighorns; Tupelo T-Rex	Kimberley Dynamiters to KIJHL; Minot Muskies		
2002–03	North; Billings Bulls; Bismarck Bobcats; Bozeman IceDogs; Fairbanks Ice Dogs; Fernie Ghostriders; Great Falls Americans; Helena Bighorns; South; Central Texas Blackhawks; Phoenix Polar Bears; Tupelo T-Rex; Wichita Falls Rustlers	Central Texas Blackhawks; Phoenix Polar Bears		Butte Irish → Wichita Falls Rustlers	
