= Missoula Maulers =

- City: Missoula, Montana
- League: Northern Pacific Hockey League; American West Hockey League; Western States Hockey League
- Founded: 2007
- Home arena: Glacier Ice Rink
- Colors: Dark Blue, black, white, and gray
- Owner(s): Michael Burks
- General manager: Marcus Baxter
- Head coach: Marcus Baxter

Franchise history
- 2007–2016: Missoula Maulers

The Missoula Maulers were a junior ice hockey team from Missoula, Montana. The team played in the Northern Pacific Hockey League, the American West Hockey League, and the Western States Hockey League, out of Missoula's Glacier Ice Rink.

Michael Burks is the club's principal owner and president of operations. In 2016, Burks and the nonprofit Missoula Area Youth Association (MAYHA), the operator of Glacier Ice Rink, had a lease dispute and Burks decided to shut down the team rather than continue to fight the operators for a better contract. The Maulers were quickly replaced at the Glacier Ice Rink by a North American 3 Hockey League expansion team, named the Missoula Jr. Bruins, owned by Jason and Liz DiMatteo.

== History ==
The Maulers were founded as an expansion team for the 2007–08 season in the Northern Pacific Hockey League (NorPac). They played in the NorPac until 2011 when many of the eastern NorPac teams formed the new American West Hockey League (AWHL) including the Maulers. After two seasons, the Maulers announced that were leaving the AWHL for the Amateur Athletic Union-sanctioned Western States Hockey League(WSHL).

The players, ages 16–20, carried amateur status under Tier III/Tier II/Junior A guidelines with hopes to earn a spot on a collegiate or minor professional team.

=== Former leagues ===
- 2007–2011: Northern Pacific Hockey League
- 2011–2013: American West Hockey League
- 2013–2016: Western States Hockey League

== Season-by-season records ==
Season	GP	W	L	OTL	PTS	GF	GA	PIM	Finish	Playoffs
2013–14	46	20	22	4	44	152	151	981	4th of 6, Northwest; 16th of 24, WSHL	Lost Div. Semifinals, 1-2 vs. Idaho Jr. Steelheads
2014–15	46	36	9	1	73	249	113	802	2nd of 7, Northwest; 4th of 28, WSHL	Div. Quarterfinals, Bye; Won Div. Semifinals, 2-1 vs. Southern Oregon Spartans; Lost Div. Finals, 1-2 vs. Idaho Jr. Steelheads
2015–16	52	38	12	2	78	257	143	715	2nd of 8, Northwest; 7th of 29, WSHL	Div. Quarterfinals, Bye; Won Div. Semifinals, 2-0 vs. Southern Oregon Spartans; Lost Div. Finals, 0-2 vs. Idaho Jr. Steelheads
