= Bellingham Sportsplex =

Coordinates: 48°44′55″N 122°27′33″W

- Interactive map of Bellingham Sportsplex
- Former names: Civic Sports and Iceplex (1997-1998)
- Address: 1225 Civic Field Way; Bellingham, Washington, U.S. USA
- Capacity: 550 (ice hockey); 610 (soccer)

Construction
- Opened: 1997

Tenant
- Bellingham H.C. (JPHL) 2026-present WWU Vikings Ice Hockey (ACHA) 1997-present Bellingham United (WISL) 2012-present

Website
- https://whatcomsportsandrec.com/

The Bellingham Sportsplex is an American multi-use sports facility located in Bellingham, Washington. The Sportsplex contains two turf fields, primarily used for indoor soccer, and an ice rink, used by local amateur ice hockey teams, figure skating lessons and performances, home games for the Whatcom Soccer Academy Rapids soccer games along with semi-pro and collegiate Western Washington University hockey teams and the local junior hockey team, Bellingham Hockey Club.

The Sportsplex's 37,000-square-foot (3,400 m^{2}) ice hockey rink opened on October 20, 1997, and cost $2 million to construct. It was owned by the Whitewater Ice Corporation, which had previously operated the defunct Whatcom County Sports Arena, on land leased from the city government. The indoor soccer field opened on January 10, 2000.
