= Ozaukee Ice Center =

Coordinates: 43.27871°N 87.97665°W

The Ozaukee Ice Center is a two-sheet ice arena located at 5505 Pioneer Road in Mequon, Wisconsin. It is home to the Concordia University Falcons Men's and Women's (NCAA Division III) and Club (ACHA Division II) Teams, as well as other Adult/Youth/Figure programs, including the Ozaukee Youth Hockey Association, OCHL Adult League, OWHL Women's League, various local high schools, and a Learn to Skate program.

== Major tenants ==
The Ozaukee Ice Center is home to the following tenants:

- Concordia University (Wisconsin) Men's Ice Hockey Team (NCAA DIII)
- Concordia University (Wisconsin) Women's Ice Hockey Team (NCAA DIII)
- Concordia University (Wisconsin) Club Ice Hockey Team (ACHA DII)
- Ozaukee Youth Hockey Association - the "Ice Dogs" (USA Hockey)
- Cedarburg High School (WIAA)
- Homestead High School (WIAA)
- Lakeshore Lightning Girls Coop (WIAA)
