= Great Falls Americans =

- City: Great Falls, Montana
- League: NA3HL
- Founded: 2011 (In the AWHL)
- Home arena: Great Falls IcePlex (1,500)
- Colors: Red, white, and blue
- Owner: Matt Leaf (2023)
- General manager: Greg Sears (2018–19)
- Head coach: Greg Sears (2018–19)

Franchise history
- 2011–present: Great Falls Americans

The Great Falls Americans are a USA Hockey-sanctioned Tier III Junior A ice hockey team from Great Falls, Montana, playing at the Great Falls IcePlex in the North American 3 Hockey League (NA3HL). The players, ages 16–20, carry amateur status under Junior A guidelines and hope to earn a place on a Canadian major junior, collegiate or minor professional team.

== History ==
The Americans were founded in 2011 (in 1992 actually as a Jr. B team in the International Junior Hockey League with Kanai, Taber, Brooks, Medicine Hat, and Lethbridge) as an expansion team scheduled to be part of the Northern Pacific Hockey League (NorPac) for the 2011–12 season. Instead, the team joined the rest of the eastern NorPac teams in creating the new American West Hockey League (AWHL).

In March 2014, the AWHL joined the North American 3 Hockey League as the Frontier Division for the 2014–15 season.

In the first year in the NA3HL the Americans won the Frontier division championship and progressed through the playoff to the Silver Cup finals. They followed up the second year with a march through the playoffs to once again appear in the Silver Cup championships.

== Season-by-season records ==
Season	GP	W	L	OTL	Pts	GF	GA	PIM	Regular season finish	Playoffs
American West Hockey League
2011–12	48	1	46	1	2	97	359	1,343	6th of 6, AWHL	Did not qualify
2012–13	48	16	30	2	34	129	194	954	6th of 7, AWHL	Did not qualify
2013–14	48	36	9	3	75	216	121	981	2nd of 8, AWHL	Won semifinals, 3–1 vs. Gillette Wild; Lost finals, 0–3 vs. Helena Bighorns
North American 3 Hockey League
2014–15	47	34	10	3	71	168	87	644	1st of 7, Frontier Div. 3rd of 31, NA3HL	Won Div. Semifinals, 2–0 vs. Billings Bulls; Won Div. Finals, 2–0 vs. Helena Bighorns; 0–3–0 in Silver Cup Round Robin (L, 1–3 vs. Wolves; L, 1–3 vs. Jets; L, 1–6 vs. Bulls)
2015–16	47	34	11	2	70	203	93	735	2nd of 7, Frontier Div. 8th of 34, NA3HL	Won Div. Semifinals, 2–0 vs. Bozeman Icedogs; Won Div. Finals, 2–0 vs. Yellowstone Quake; 2–1–0 in Silver Cup Round Robin (W, 2–1 vs. Ducks; L, 1–4 vs. Bulls; W, 8–1 vs. Quake); Lost semifinal game, 4–5 vs. Metro Jets
2016–17	47	38	4	5	81	258	96	699	2nd of 8, Frontier Div. 4th of 48, NA3HL	Won Div. Semifinals, 2–0 vs. Gillete Wild; Lost Div. Finals, 1–2 vs. Yellowstone Quake
2017–18	47	34	11	2	70	195	107	633	2nd of 6, Frontier Div. 8th of 42, NA3HL	Lost div. semi-finals, 0–2 vs. Helena Bighorns
2018–19	47	38	8	1	77	258	96	821	2nd of 7, Frontier Div. 5th of 36, NA3HL	Won Div. Semifinals, 2–1 vs. Bozeman Icedogs; Lost Div. Finals, 1–2 vs. Helena Bighorns
2019–20	47	33	9	5	71	184	98	763	3rd of 8, Frontier Div. 7th of 34, NA3HL	Won Div. Quarterfinals, 2–0 vs. Helena Bighorns; Led Div. Semifinals, 1–0 vs. Sheridan Hawks; Playoffs cancelled
2020–21	40	27	11	2	56	154	113	749	2nd of 8, Frontier Div. 9th of 31, NA3HL	Won Div. Semifinals, 2–1 vs. Gillete Wild; Lost Div. Finals, 1–2 vs. Sheridan Hawks
2021–22	47	22	20	5	49	181	172	745	4th of 8, Frontier Div. 18th of 34, NA3HL	Won play-in series, 2–0 vs. Badlands Sabres; Lost div. semi-finals, 0-2 Helena Bighorns
2022–23	47	17	27	3	37	125	182	745	6th of 8, Frontier Div. 25th of 34, NA3HL	Did not qualify for Post Season Play
2023–24	47	22	23	2	46	134	156	734	6th of 8, Frontier Div. 21st of 34, NA3HL	Lost Div Semifinal 0-2 (Helena Bighorns)
2024–25	47	27	14	6	60	183	134	611	3rd of 8, Frontier Div. 12st of 35, NA3HL	Won Div Semifinal 0-2 (Sheridan Hawks); Lost Div Finals 0-2 (Helena Bighorns)
2025–26	47	30	14	3	63	188	132	579	3rd of 8, Frontier Div. 11th of 38, NA3HL	Won Div Semifinal 1-2 (Helena Bighorns)
