= Yellowstone Quake =

- City: Cody, Wyoming
- League: NA3HL
- Division: Frontier
- Founded: 2001
- Home arena: Victor Riley Arena
- Colors: Blue, gold, gray
- Owner: 501c3 Park County Junior A Hockey Program
- Head coach: Gaetano Moirano
- Website: Yellowstone Quake Website

Franchise history
- 2001–2005: Kootenai Colts
- 2005–2006: Coeur d'Alene Colts
- 2006–present: Yellowstone Quake

The Yellowstone Quake is a USA Hockey-sanctioned Tier III junior ice hockey team playing in the North American 3 Hockey League (NA3HL). The team plays their home games at Victor Riley Arena in Cody, Wyoming. The franchise is a non-profit corporation operated by the Park County Junior A Hockey Program.

== History ==
The franchise was previously located in Coeur d'Alene, Idaho, originally known as the Kootenai Colts and then the Coeur d'Alene Colts as part of the Northern Pacific Hockey League (NorPac). While in Coeur d'Alene, the franchise won the NorPac's 2001–02 Cascade Cup Championship.

In 2012, the Quake joined the American West Hockey League (AWHL) for the league's second season.

In March 2014, the AWHL joined the North American 3 Hockey League as the new Frontier Division for the 2014–15 season.

During the 2023-24 season, the Yellowstone Quake achieved an achievement that no team wants to achieve: a winless season. During the 2023-24 season, the Yellowstone Quake went 0-44-3, also getting outscored 60 goals to 328. They've been beat 16-0 at home before. And in a 47 game season, they got beat by 5 or more in 26 games. The season started with a close 5-4 loss on the road to the Great Falls Americans and ended with losing 10-0 on the road to the Sheridan Hawks. In the last 5 games of the season, the Yellowstone Quake were kept off the scoreboard. Including that, they were shutout 12 times that season.

== Season-by-season records ==
Season	GP	W	L	OTL	Pts	GF	GA	PIM	Regular season finish	Playoffs
North American 3 Hockey League
2014–15	47	9	34	4	22	100	222	772	7 of 7, Frontier Div. 29 of 31, NA3HL	Did not qualify
2015–16	47	35	9	3	73	225	121	899	1st of 7, Frontier Div. 4th of 31, NA3HL	Won Div. Semifinals, 2–1 vs. Gillete Wild; Lost Div. Finals, 0–2 vs. Great Falls Americans; 0–3–0 in Silver Cup round-robin (as wild card) (L, 2–6 vs. Bulls; L, 0–3 vs. Ducks; L, 1–8 vs. Americans)
2016–17	47	40	4	3	83	291	100	752	1st of 8, Frontier Div. 3rd of 48, NA3HL	Won Div. Semifinals, 2–0 vs. Bozeman Icedogs; Won Div. Finals, 2–1 vs. Great Falls Americans; 2–1–0, 2nd of 4 in Silver Cup round-robin Pool B (W, 4–2 vs. Bulls; W, 5–2 vs. Sharks; L, 2–3 vs. Jr. Senators); Lost Silver Cup Semifinal game, 1–6 vs. Metro Jets
2017–18	47	35	7	5	75	263	104	618	1st of 6, Frontier Div. 6th of 42, NA3HL	Won Div. Semifinals, 2–0 vs. Gillette Wild; Won Div. Finals, 2–0 vs. Helena Bighorns; 2–1–0 in Fraser Cup round-robin Pool A (L, 0–4 vs. Jr. Blues; W, 4–3 vs. Jr. Senators; OTW, 2–1 vs. Lumberjacks)
2018–19	47	5	40	2	12	121	286	989	7th of 7, Frontier Div. 33rd of 36, NA3HL	Did not qualify
2019–20	47	19	25	3	41	140	190	916	4th of 8, Frontier Div. 22nd of 34, NA3HL	Won Div. Quarterfinals, 2–0 vs. Gillette Wild; Playoffs cancelled
2020–21	40	12	25	3	27	116	220	1047	7th of 8, Frontier Div. 23rd of 31, NA3HL	Did not qualify
2021–22	47	13	31	3	29	128	246	1049	7th of 8, Frontier Div. 26th of 34, NA3HL	Did not qualify
2022–23	47	13	28	6	32	106	170	1034	7th of 8, Frontier Div. 27th of 34, NA3HL	Did not qualify
2023–24	47	0	44	3	3	60	328	1034	8th of 8, Frontier Div. 34th of 34, NA3HL	Did not qualify
2024–25	47	1	45	1	3	65	380	972	8th of 8, Frontier Div. 35th of 35, NA3HL	Did not qualify
2025–26	47	11	33	3	25	117	227	681	7th of 8, Frontier Div. 33rd of 38, NA3HL	Did not qualify

== Alumni ==
The Quake have had a number of alumni move on to collegiate programs, higher levels of junior ice hockey in the United States and Canada. In 2013, former Quake player Jacob Doty signed a three-year deal with the St. Louis Blues of the National Hockey League.
