= Northern Pacific Hockey League =

- Sport: Ice Hockey
- Founded: 2000
- Folded: 2016
- No. of teams: 4
- Country: United States
- Last champion: Wenatchee Wolves (2015–16)
- Most titles: Helena Bighorns/Queen City Cutthroats (6)
- Website: NPHLonline.com

The Northern Pacific Hockey League (NPHL) was an American Tier III junior ice hockey league sanctioned by USA Hockey. Its championship trophy was the Cascade Cup.

== History ==
Established in 2000 as the NorPac Junior Hockey League, the league was sanctioned as Junior B by USA Hockey. Six teams from Alaska, Oregon, Washington and the Yukon Territory competed in the inaugural season of 2000–01.

In 2007, the NorPac was promoted to Tier III Junior A by USA Hockey. In 2011, USA Hockey dropped the letter designation in Tier III and had all Tier III compete in the same national tournament.

In 2013, NorPac changed its abbreviated moniker to NPHL.

The league announced three new members to start the 2014–15 season: Cheney Ice Hawks, Tacoma Knights and Wenatchee Wolves. Organizational problems resulted in the Tacoma Knights being unable to field a team for 2014–15.

May 25, 2015, the league announced that the Seattle Ravens would be a 2015–16 expansion franchise.

On April 25, 2016, the NPHL announced that at the annual governor's meeting the league had decided to look into merging with a larger junior league for more stability. Also in the press release, it was announced that the Bellingham Blazers had left the league. While it was not clarified in the official NPHL press release, the most recent league champions, Wenatchee Wolves, had also removed references to the NPHL from their website and appeared to focus their efforts on their youth programs instead. On May 20, 2016, it was announced that the four remaining teams would join the United States Premier Hockey League's USP3 platform as a new Pacific Division. Three of the four teams folded after one season in the USPHL and the Eugene Generals went independent after two seasons.

== Final teams ==
Team	Location	Arena	Joined	Championships
Bellingham Blazers	Bellingham, WA	Bellingham Sportsplex	2012–13	2
Eugene Generals	Eugene, OR	Lane Events Center	2005–06	0
Seattle Ravens	Kent, WA	Kent Valley Ice Centre	2015–16	0
Tri-City Outlaws	Kennewick, WA	Toyota Center	2012–13	0
Wenatchee Wolves	Wenatchee, WA	Town Toyota Center	2014–15	1
West Sound Warriors	Bremerton, WA	Bremerton Ice Arena	2000–01	1

== Former teams ==
- Alaska Arctic Ice (2000–01; played inaugural season only)
- Billings Bulls (2006–11; joined as an expansion team after dropping down from the Tier II North American Hockey League, left for the American West Hockey League)
- Bellingham Blazers (2012–16; left for the Western States Hockey League)
- Bozeman Blackhawks / Bozeman Icedogs (2005–11; expansion team in 2005 as Blackhawks, renamed Icedogs when the Icedogs' organization left the Tier II North American Hockey League in 2006, left for the American West Hockey League)
- Cheney Icehawks (2014–15; joined as an expansion team and ceased operations August 25, 2015 after one season due to lack of players)
- Eugene Thunder / Butte Roughriders (2000–11; franchise rights moved to Butte in 2003; folded in 2011)
- Fairbanks Ice Dogs (2000–01; played inaugural season and left for the America West Hockey League)
- Glacier Nationals (2011–13; left for the American West Hockey League)
- Kent Crusaders / Seattle Totems (2005–12; joined as the Crusaders, sold in 2006 and renamed Totems; left for the Western States Hockey League)
- Kootenai Colts / Coeur d'Alene Colts / Yellowstone Quake (2001–12; Colts from 2001 to 2006, then relocated and named Quake; left for the American West Hockey League)
- Liberty Lake Lumberjacks / Spokane Flyers / Coeur d'Alene Lakers (2000–09; Lumberjacks from 2000 to 2002, Flyers from 2002 to 2006, then the Lakers until folding)
- Missoula Maulers (2007–11; joined as an expansion team and left for the American West Hockey League)
- Portland Pioneers / Fort Vancouver Pioneers (2000–07; left for the WHA Jr. Hockey League; folded after eight games in 2007)
- Queen City Cutthroats / Helena Bighorns (2004–11; joined as Cutthroats until the Bighorns' organization dropped their Tier II team in 2006, left for the American West Hockey League)
- River City Jaguars / Vancouver Victory / Vancouver Vipers / Fort Vancouver Vipers (2004–14; ceased operations)
- Rogue Valley Wranglers / Southern Oregon Spartans (2007–12; left for the Western States Hockey League)
- Tacoma Knights (proposed 2014–15 expansion team that never played)
- Tri-City Titans (2001–10; team folded)
- Wenatchee Wolves (2014–16; left league to focus on youth hockey in the North American Prospects Hockey League)
- Yukon Claimjumpers (2000–01; played inaugural season out of Whitehorse, Yukon)

== Cascade Cup champions ==
Season	Winner	Runner-up	Result
2000–01	Fairbanks Ice Dogs		
2001–02	Kootenai Colts		
2002–03	Eugene Thunder		
2003–04	Portland Pioneers		
2004–05	Queen City Cutthroats		
2005–06	Queen City Cutthroats	Eugene Generals	3-2 (best-of 5)
2006–07	Fort Vancouver Pioneers	Helena Bighorns	3-0 (best-of 5)
2007–08	Helena Bighorns	Seattle Totems	3-0 (best-of 5)
2008–09	Helena Bighorns	Seattle Totems	3-1 (best-of 5)
2009–10	Helena Bighorns	Seattle Totems	3-0 (best-of 5)
2010–11	Helena Bighorns	Seattle Totems	3-0 (best-of 5)
2011–12	Southern Oregon Spartans	Seattle Totems	3-0 (best-of 5)
2012–13	Bellingham Blazers	West Sound Warriors	3-2 (best-of 5)
2013–14	Bellingham Blazers	West Sound Warriors	3-2 (best-of 5)
2014–15	West Sound Warriors	Bellingham Blazers	3-0 (best-of 5)
2015–16	Wenatchee Wolves	Bellingham Blazers	3-0 (best-of 5)

== National champions ==
- 2010–11: Helena Bighorns
