= Helena Bighorns =

- City: Helena, Montana
- League: NA3HL
- Division: Frontier
- Founded: 2004 (In the NorPac)
- Home arena: Helena Ice Arena
- Colors: Blue, silver and white
- Mascot: Billy Bighorn
- Owner: Treasure State Sports Group LTD
- Head coach: Damon Hanson
- Website: www.helenabighorns.com

Franchise history
- 2004–2006: Queen City Cutthroats
- 2006–present: Helena Bighorns

The Helena Bighorns are a Junior A ice hockey team in the North American 3 Hockey League (NA3HL) based in Helena, Montana United States. The team plays their home games at the 1,600-seat Helena Ice Arena.

The Bighorns were members of the NorPac from 2007 to 2011. In 2011, the American West Division of the NorPac league broke away to form the American West Hockey League. In March 2014, the NA3HL accepted the AWHL as a new Frontier Division.

== History ==
The original Helena Bighorns were members of the former Tier II America West Hockey League from 2001 to 2003 after replacing the departed Helena Gold Rush that had operated last in the 1999–2000 season (formerly known as the Helena Ice Pirates from 1994 to 1999). In 2003, the AWHL merged with the larger Tier II North American Hockey League and the Bighorns played in the NAHL until 2006.

In 2004, the Tier III Northern Pacific Hockey League (NorPac) expanded into Helena with the Queen City Cutthroats and were immediately successful, winning the Cascade Cup in their first year. In 2006, the NAHL Bighorns withdrew from the NAHL and the NorPac franchise would take the name of the formerly higher level team beginning with the 2006–07 season.

=== NorPac years (2004–11) ===
The Helena Bighorns/Queen City Cutthroats won six straight NorPac America West Division Championships between 2005 and 2010. They also won the NorPac Cascade Cup six times, 2005, 2006 and four straight from 2008 to 2011.

=== American West years (2011–14) ===
The Helena Bighorns have won three straight American West Hockey League Championships in the 2011–12, 2012–13, and 2013–14 AWHL seasons prior to the league merging with the North American 3 Hockey League (NA3HL) in 2014.

=== North American 3 Hockey League (2014–present) ===
For many years, the team and the arena were owned by Oren Koules, president of Evolution Entertainment and former part-owner of the Tampa Bay Lightning (NHL). However, in 2017, he was looking to sell off the team or cease operations. In May 2017, he sold the team to local businessman Randy Rose. Koules remained the owner of Helena Ice Arena. In 2021, the team was sold to a local ownership group Treasure State Sports Group LTD, composed of Jedidiah Snyder and Michael Greene.

== Season-by-season records ==
Season	GP	W	L	OTL	Pts	GF	GA	PIM	Regular season finish	Playoffs
North American 3 Hockey League
2014–15	47	34	11	2	70	194	98	1,073	2nd of 7, Frontier Div. 5th of 31, NA3HL	Won Div. Semifinals, 2–1 vs. Gillette Wild; Lost Div. Finals, 0–2 vs. Great Falls Americans
2015–16	47	26	21	0	52	174	155	1,136	5th of 7, Frontier Div. 19th of 34, NA3HL	Did not qualify
2016–17	47	15	31	1	31	130	202	929	6th of 8, Frontier Div. 40th of 48, NA3HL	Lost Div. Quarterfinals, 1–2 vs. Gillette Wild
2017–18	47	30	13	4	64	205	143	874	3rd of 6, Frontier Div. 15th of 42, NA3HL	Won Div. Semifinals, 2–0 vs. Great Falls Americans; Lost Div. Finals, 0–2 vs. Yellowstone Quake
2018–19	47	38	7	2	78	252	115	777	1st of 7, Frontier Div. 4th of 36, NA3HL	Won Div. Semifinals, 2–0 vs. Missoula Jr. Bruins; Won Div. Finals, 2–1 vs. Great Falls Americans; Advance to Fraser Cup
2019–20	47	17	26	4	38	145	192	855	6th of 8, Frontier Div. 25th of 34, NA3HL	Lost Div. Quarterfinals, 0–2 vs. Great Falls Americans
2020–21	40	17	20	3	37	126	133	368	5th of 8, Frontier Div. 19th of 31, NA3HL	Did not qualify
2021–22	47	42	3	2	86	289	94	1,312	1st of 8, Frontier Div. 3rd of 34, NA3HL	Won Div. Semifinals, 0-2 Great Falls Americans; Won Div. Finals, 2-0 Gillette Wild; Advance to Fraser Cup
2022–23	47	36	8	3	75	187	84	1,252	1st of 8, Frontier Div. 3rd of 34, NA3HL	Won Div. Semifinals, 2-0 Butte Cobras; Won Div. FINALS, 2-1 Gillette Wild; Advance to Fraser Cup
2023–24	47	44	2	1	89	278	95	1,433	1st of 8, Frontier Div. 1st of 34, NA3HL	Won Div. Semifinals, 2-0 Great Falls Americans; Won Div. Finals, 2-0 Gillette Wild; Advance to Fraser Cup
2024–25	47	41	4	2	84	227	94	994	1st of 8, Frontier Div. 2nd of 35, NA3HL	Won Div. Semifinals, 2-0 Great Falls Americans; Won Div. Finals, 2-0 Gillette Wild; Advance to Fraser Cup
2025–26	47	34	12	1	69	247	125	757	2nd of 8, Frontier Div. 7th of 38, NA3HL	Won Div. Semifinals, 2-1 Great Falls Americans; Won Div. Finals, 2-0 Sheridan Hawks; Advance to Fraser Cup

== NA3HL FRASER CUP Championship ==
Year	Round Robin	Record	Place	Semifinal	Championship
2019	L, Nordiques 1-4; L, Bulls) 2-8	0-2-0	3rd of 3 Pool	Did not advance	
2022	W, Granite City Lumberjacks ?-? W, El Paso Rhinos) ?-?	2-0-0	1st of 3 Pool	Lost Semi Final, 1-4; Rochester Grizzlies	Did not advance
2023	W, Oregon Tradesmen ?-? L, (Northeast Generals) ?-?	2-0-0	1st of 3 Pool	Lost Semi Final, 2-4; Granite City Lumberjacks	Did not advance
2024	W, Louisiana Drillers 7-3; W, Northeast Generals 4-1	2-0-0	1st of 3 Pool B	Won Semi Final, 3-1; Gillette Wild	Won FINALS 2-1; Northeast Generals; Fraser Cup Champions
2025	L, West Bend Power 4-5; L, New Mexico Ice Wolves 2-4	0-0-2	3rd of 3 Pool A	Did not advance	
2026	L, Rochester Grizzlies 5-6; L, Louisiana Drillers 0-6	0-0-2	3rd of 3 Pool A	Did not advance	

== Tier III Junior Hockey National Championship ==
In 2005 and 2006, the Queen City Cutthroats participated in the USA Hockey Tier III Junior B National Tournament. In 2007, NorPac and its teams were promoted to Tier III Junior A status and the Bighorns competed in the 2008, 2009, 2010, 2011 Junior A National Tournaments. In 2011, USA Hockey dropped the A and B designations but sometimes had the leagues split into different divisions during the tournament (American/National for 2012 or Div 1/Div 2 for 2015 with 2013 and 2014 having all leagues compete in one tournament). The Bighorns represented the American West Hockey League in 2012, 2013, and 2014.

In 2011, the Helena Bighorns won the Tier III Junior A Hockey National Championships by defeating the El Paso Rhinos 5-1 in Rochester, Minnesota. The Helena Bighorns won the bronze medal at the 2014 USA Hockey Tier III National championships.

Round robin play in pool with top 4 teams advancing to semi-final.

Year	Round Robin	Record	Place	Semifinal	Championship
2006	W, Boston Jr. Bruins (EmJHL) 3-1; L, Phoenix Polar Bears (WSHL) 4-8; L, St. Louis Jr. Blues (CSHL) 1-5	1-2-0	3rd of 4 Div. I	Did not advance	
2008	L, Northern Cyclones (AtJHL) 1-5; W, Minnesota Ice Hawks (MnJHL) 4-2; W, Cleveland Jr. Lumberjacks (CSHL) 5-0	2-1-0	2nd of 4 Div. II	Did not advance	
2009	W, New York Bobcats (AtJHL) 3-1; W, El Paso Rhinos (WSHL) 4-3; L, New Hampshire Jr. Monarchs (EJHL) 3-6	2-1-0	2nd of 4 Div. I	Did not advance	
2010	L, Dubuque Thunderbirds (CSHL) 2-4; W, Boulder Bison (WSHL) 5-0; T, New Hampshire Jr. Monarchs (EJHL) 3-3	1-1-1	3rd of 4 Div. I	Did not advance	
2011	W, Rochester Ice Hawks (MnJHL) 6-1; W, Queen City Steam (NA3HL) 4-0; L, Walpole Express (AtJHL) 3-4	2-1-0	1st of 4 Pool III	W, Walpole Express (AtJHL) 4-3	W, El Paso Rhinos (WSHL) 5-1; NATIONAL; CHAMPIONS
2012	L, Long Island Royals (MetJHL) 1-3; L, Atlanta Junior Knights (EJHL South) 0-1; W, Chicago Junior Bulldogs (NA3HL) 10-3	1-2-0	3rd of 4 Pool I, National Div.	Did not advance	
2013	OTW, New Jersey Rockets (MetJHL) 2-1; W, Boch Blazers (ESHL) 11-2; L, Atlanta Junior Knights (EJHL South) 3-5	2-1-0	2nd of 4 American Pool	OTL, North Iowa Bulls (NA3HL) 2-3	—
2014	W, Marquette Royales (MnJHL) 6-2; L, Boston Jr. Bruins (USPHL Premier) 0-6; L, New Hampshire Jr Monarchs (EHL) 3-5	1-2-0	3rd of 4 Red Pool	Did not advance	

== Alumni ==
The Bighorns have had a number of alumni move on to NCAA Division I, Division III, ACHA collegiate programs, higher levels of junior ice hockey, and professional ice hockey.
