= List of Corner Brook Royals seasons =

The Corner Brook Royals are a senior ice hockey team based in Corner Brook, Newfoundland and Labrador and a member of the Central West Senior Hockey League. Corner Brook has been associated with Newfoundland senior hockey since March 1935 when their picked team of league all-stars won the first all-Newfoundland championship and, in December of that year, became a member of the western division of the Newfoundland Amateur Hockey Association.

== Table key ==
Key of terms and abbreviations
Term or abbreviation	Definition
Finish	Final position in division or league standings
GA	Goals against (goals scored by the Flyers' opponents)
GF	Goals for (goals scored by the Flyers)
GP	Number of games played
L	Number of losses
OTL	Number of losses in overtime
PTS	Number of points
T	Number of ties
TG	Two-game total goals series
W	Number of wins
—	Does not apply

== NAHA Western Division (1935-1953) ==
Herder Trophy champions‡

NAHA = Newfoundland Amateur Hockey Association

Corner Brook regular season and postseason statistics and results, 1935–1953
Season	League	Regular season									Postseason					
Season	League	GP	W	L	T	OTL	GF	GA	PTS	Finish	GP	W	L	GF	GA	Result
1935		—	—	—	—	—	—	—	—	—	2	2	0	5	2	Won first Herder Memorial Trophy vs. Guards of St. John's, 5-2 (TG)‡
1935-36	NAHA	—	—	—	—	—	—	—	—	—	3	1	2	8	18	Lost in Herder final to St. Bon's, 2G-5G
1936-37	NAHA	—	—	—	—	—	—	—	—	—	2	0	2	3	7	Lost to Buchans in Western finals, 3-7 (TG)
1937-38	NAHA	—	—	—	—	—	—	—	—	—	4	2	2	14	17	Lost in Western finals to Grand Falls, 3-7 (TG)
1938-39	NAHA	—	—	—	—	—	—	—	—	—	2	0	2	3	8	Lost in Western finals to Buchans, 3-8 (TG)
1939-40	NAHA	—	—	—	—	—	—	—	—	—						
1940-41	NAHA	—	—	—	—	—	—	—	—	—						
1941-42	NAHA	—	—	—	—	—	—	—	—	—	—	—	—	—	—	Herder playoffs were cancelled due to WWII
1942-43	NAHA	—	—	—	—	—	—	—	—	—	—	—	—	—	—	Herder playoffs were cancelled due to WWII
1943-44	NAHA	—	—	—	—	—	—	—	—	—	7	4	3	41	28	Lost in Herder finals to Bell Island, 0-3
1944-45	NAHA	—	—	—	—	—	—	—	—	—	—	—	—	—	—	Did not enter Herder playoffs
1945-46	NAHA	—	—	—	—	—	—	—	—	—	2	0	2	5	15	Lost in Western finals to Grand Falls, 5-15 (TG)
1946-47	NAHA	—	—	—	—	—	—	—	—	—	2	1	1	9	10	Lost in Western finals to Grand Falls, 9-10 (TG)
1947-48	NAHA	—	—	—	—	—	—	—	—	—	2	0	2	8	17	Lost in Western finals to Buchans, 8-17 (TG)
1948-49	NAHA	—	—	—	—	—	—	—	—	—	4	2	2	16	24	Lost in Herder finals to St. Bon's, 6-21 (TG)
1949-50	NAHA	—	—	—	—	—	—	—	—	—	2	0	2	6	40	Lost in Western finals to Buchans, 6-40 (TG)
1950-51	NAHA	—	—	—	—	—	—	—	—	—	2	0	2	2	54	Lost in Western finals to Buchans, 2-54 (TG)
1951-52	NAHA	—	—	—	—	—	—	—	—	—	2	0	2	6	55	Lost in Western finals to Buchans, 6-55 (TG)
1952-53	NAHA	—	—	—	—	—	—	—	—	—	—	—	—	—	—	Did not enter Herder playoffs

=== Notes (1935–1953) ===
- Since 1927, prior to the founding of the Newfoundland Amateur Hockey Association (NAHA) in December 1935, picked teams from Corner Brook were playing exhibition games and a number of intertown series' with teams from other hockey centres. From 1935-36 to the end of the 1952-53 season, Corner Brook was a member of the Western Division of the Newfoundland Senior League. There were no regular seasons during this period. The all-stars played a series of exhibition games and then competed in a pre-determined playoff format to decide the western champions who would advance to the all-Newfoundland Herder finals against the Eastern champions.

== NAHA Section B (1953-1959) ==
NAHA-B = Newfoundland Amateur Hockey Association Section B

Corner Brook All-Stars/Royals Section B regular season and postseason statistics and results, 1953–1959
Season	League	Regular season									Postseason					
Season	League	GP	W	L	T	OTL	GF	GA	PTS	Finish	GP	W	L	GF	GA	Result
1953-54	NAHA-B	—	—	—	—	—	—	—	—	—	—	—	—	—	—	Did not enter Section B playoffs
1954-55	NAHA-B	—	—	—	—	—	—	—	—	—	—	—	—	—	—	Did not enter Section B playoffs
1955-56	NAHA-B	—	—	—	—	—	—	—	—	—	2	0	2	8	12	Lost Section B western finals to Grand Falls Bees, 0-2
1956-57	NAHA-B	—	—	—	—	—	—	—	—	—	4	2	2	13	22	Lost Section B western finals to Grand Falls Bees, 0-2
1957-58	NAHA-B	—	—	—	—	—	—	—	—	—	3	0	3	6	41	Lost Section B western semi-finals to Grand Falls Bees, 0-3
1958-59	NAHA-B	—	—	—	—	—	—	—	—	—	5	2	3	20	19	Lost Section B western semi-final to Buchans Miners, 2-3

== NAHA Section A (1958-1959) ==
NAHA-A = Newfoundland Amateur Hockey Association Section A

Corner Brook All-Stars/Royals Section A regular season and postseason statistics and results, 1953–1959
Season	League	Regular season									Postseason					
Season	League	GP	W	L	T	OTL	GF	GA	PTS	Finish	GP	W	L	GF	GA	Result
1957-58	NAHA-A	—	—	—	—	—	—	—	—	—	5	1	4	24	35	Lost in Herder finals to Grand Falls Andcos, 4-1
1958-59	NAHA-A	—	—	—	—	—	—	—	—	—	3	0	3	9	63	Lost in Herder semi-finals to Grand Falls Andcos, 0-3

=== Notes (1953-1959) ===
- Corner Brook didn't enter NAHA playoffs during 1953-1955. From 1955-56 to 1958-59, they entered a team in Section "B" where teams could not have imports (paid players) on their rosters. With no regular seasons during this period, the all-stars/Royals played a series of exhibition games and then competed in the Section B playoffs for the Evening Telegram Trophy. The Corner Brook Royals entered a section "A" team in the Herder playoffs in 1958 and 1959.

== NAHA Western Division (1959-1962) ==
NAHA = Newfoundland Amateur Hockey Association

Corner Brook Royals regular season and postseason statistics and results, 1959-1962
Season	League	Regular season									Postseason					
Season	League	GP	W	L	T	OTL	GF	GA	PTS	Finish	GP	W	L	GF	GA	Result
1959-60	NAHA	—	—	—	—	—	—	—	—	—	12	3	9			3rd after round robin Herder semi-finals, DNQ for finals
1960-61	NAHA	—	—	—	—	—	—	—	—	—	13	8	5			Lost Herder semi-final tie-breaker to Gander Flyers, 1-2
1961-62	NAHA	—	—	—	—	—	—	—	—	—	12	10	2			Won Herder Memorial Trophy vs. Conception Bay CeeBees, 4-2

=== Notes (1959-1962) ===
- From 1959-60 to 1961-62, the Corner Brook Royals were a member of NAHA's Western Division. There were a series of exhibition game followed by a round robin Herder western semi-finals. The top team after the semi-finals played the Eastern round robin champion in a Herder finals series.

== NSHL (1962-1983) ==
Led league in points†	Herder Trophy champions‡

NSHL = Newfoundland Senior Hockey League

Corner Brook Royals regular season and postseason statistics and results, 1962-1983
Season	League	Regular season									Postseason				
Season	League	GP	W	L	T	GF	GA	PTS	Finish	GP	W	L	GF	GA	Result
1962-63	NSHL	16	6	10	0	74	91	12	4th	—	—	—	—	—	—
1963-64	NSHL	20	16	4	0	138	69	32†	1st	—	—	—	—	—	
1964-65	NSHL	20	16	3	1	139	80	33	2nd	—	—	—	—	—	
1965-66	NSHL	32	22	9	1	188	137	45†	1st	—	—	—	—	—	
1966-67	NSHL	40	21	16	3	200	202	45	3rd	—	—	—	—	—	
1967-68	NSHL	40	19	16	5	199	174	43	3rd	—	—	—	—	—	
1968-69	NSHL	40	17	19	4	177	173	38	5th	—	—	—	—		
1969-70	NSHL	40	18	17	5	201	177	41	3rd	—	—	—	—	—	
1970-71	NSHL	36	16	13	7	156	162	39	2nd	—	—	—	—	—	
1971-72	NSHL	36	9	25	2	167	254	20	4th	—	—	—	—	—	
1972-73	NSHL	36	23	12	1	203	158	47†	1st	—	—	—	—	—	
1973-74	NSHL	32	13	15	4	211	145	32	3rd	—	—	—	—	—	
1974-75	NSHL	16	1	13	2	56	127	4	3rd	—	—	—	—		
1975-76	NSHL	20	8	8	4	90	101	20	3rd	—	—	—	—	—	—
1976-77	NSHL	32	25	7	0	246	116	50†	1st, West	—	—	—	—	—	
1977-78	NSHL	32	22	8	2	209	142	46	2nd, West	—	—	—	—	—	
1978-79	NSHL	30	11	13	6	152	166	28	4th	—	—	—	—	—	
1979-80	NSHL	34	14	16	4	152	172	32	5th	—	—	—	—	—	
1980-81	NSHL	32	14	15	3	156	186	31	3rd						Lost in Herder finals to Grand Falls Cataracts, 2-4
1981-82	NSHL	—	—	—	—	—	—	—	—	—	—	—	—	—	Did not enter a team in NSHL
1982-83	NSHL	—	—	—	—	—	—	—	—	—	—	—	—	—	Did not enter a team in NSHL
1983-84	NSHL	40	20	15	5	232	184	45	2nd	9	4	5	45	42	Lost in Herder finals to Stephenville Jets, 1-4
1984-85	NSHL	36	20	13	3	196	172	43	2nd	9	7	2	54	28	Won Herder Memorial Trophy vs. Stephenville Jets, 4-2‡
1985-86	NSHL	40	24	12	2	242	172	52	2nd						Won Herder Memorial Trophy vs. Stephenville Jets, 4-2‡
1986-87	NSHL	44	21	21	2	258	254	44	3rd	—	—	—	—		
1987-88	NSHL	48	32	12	4	394	220	68	2nd	—	—	—	—		Won Herder Memorial Trophy vs. St. John's Capitals, 4-1‡
1988-89	NSHL	48	21	23	2	195	199	33	3rd						
1989-90	NSHL									8	4	4	50	52	Lost in Herder finals to St. John's Capitals, 0-4

== WCSHL (1996-2011) ==
Note: GP = Games played, W = Wins, L = Losses, T = Ties, OTL = Overtime Losses, Pts = Points, GF = Goals for, GA = Goals against

WCSHL = West Coast Senior Hockey League

Corner Brook Royals regular season and postseason statistics and results, 2009-2012
Season	League	Regular season									Postseason					
Season	League	GP	W	L	T	OTL	GF	GA	PTS	Finish	GP	W	L	GF	GA	Result
1996-97	WCSHL													—	—	
2010-11	WCSHL													—	—	

== NSHL/CWSHL (2012-present) ==
NSHL = Newfoundland Senior Hockey League, CWSHL = Central West Senior Hockey League

Corner Brook/Western Royals regular season and postseason statistics and results, 2012–present
Season	League	Regular season									Postseason					
Season	League	GP	W	L	T	OTL	GF	GA	PTS	Finish	GP	W	L	GF	GA	Result
2011–12	NSHL	24	12	11	—	1	95	104	25	3rd						
2012–13	NSHL	24	13	11	—	0	108	115	26	3rd						Lost in semi-finals
2013-14	NSHL	24	11	10	—	3	87	83	25	3rd						
2014-15	CWSHL	24	14	10	—	0	89	82	28	1st	8	4	4			Lost in Herder finals (Grand Falls-Windsor Cataracts), 0-4
2015–16	CWSHL	22	12	10	—	0	87	88	24	2nd	12	5	7	34	43	Lost CWSHL finals to Grand Falls-Windsor Cataracts, 1-4

== WCSHL (2017-present) ==
WCSHL = West Coast Senior Hockey League

Corner Brook/Western Royals regular season and postseason statistics and results, 2012–present
Season	League	Regular season									Postseason				
Season	League	GP	W	L	OTL	GF	GA	PTS	Finish	GP	W	L	GF	GA	Result
2016-17	WCSHL														Won WCSHL championship vs. Deer Lake Red Wings
2017-18	WCSHL	18	15	3	0	85	55	26	1st	6	2	4	10	31	Lost WCSHL championship to Deer Lake Red Wings, 0-4
