= Terry Ryan (ice hockey, born 1977) =

Canadian ice hockey player (born 1977)

- Born: January 14, 1977 (age 49) St. John's, Newfoundland, Canada
- Height: 6 ft 1 in (185 cm)
- Weight: 207 lb (94 kg; 14 st 11 lb)
- Position: Left wing
- Shot: Left
- Played for: Montreal Canadiens
- NHL draft: 8th overall, 1995; Montreal Canadiens
- Playing career: 1996–2003; 2024

Terrence William James Ryan (born January 14, 1977) is a Canadian professional ice hockey player and actor. He was drafted by the Montreal Canadiens eighth overall in the 1995 NHL entry draft and played eight games with the organization between 1996 and 1999.

== Early life ==
Raised in Mount Pearl, Newfoundland, Ryan started playing sports at an early age. His father, Terry Ryan Sr., played for the Hamilton Red Wings in the OHA before venturing on his hockey quest that would see him play five years of pro hockey highlighted by a year in the World Hockey Association with the Minnesota Fighting Saints.

When the younger Ryan was 10, his second cousin Michelle Meger was killed in Edmonton by a drunk driver. Meger was in her early twenties when she died. The families were so close that Ryan stayed with her parents in Edmonton when he was drafted to the NHL. He continues to advocate against drunk driving.

As a youth, Ryan played in the 1990 and 1991 Quebec International Pee-Wee Hockey Tournaments with a minor ice hockey team from Mount Pearl.

In 1991, at 14 years of age, Ryan was invited to play Junior “A” hockey for the Quesnel Millionaires in BC for two years, where he won the Top Scorer Award and was selected as a member of the Rocky Mountain League All-Star Team.

== Playing career ==
Ryan was the third-overall draft pick in the major junior Western Hockey League bantam draft, by the Tri-City Americans. Ryan was named the Western Hockey League Rookie of the Year in ’93 and Most Improved Player in ‘94. The following year, he won the WHL's Plus-Minus Award, was named Most Spirited Player, and claimed the fourth overall ranking in league scoring (50 goals, 60 assists).

Ryan was selected eighth overall by the Montreal Canadiens, in the 1995 NHL entry draft. His hockey career continued with the Fredericton Canadiens where he was named Rookie of the Year in 1998, claimed second in goals (21), and led the league in fights (34).

Despite his high draft ranking, Ryan played only 8 games in the NHL over parts of three seasons, all spent with Montreal, failing to register a single point and suffering a career-ending ankle injury in 2001, ending his chances at returning to the big leagues. Due to such a short NHL career, Ryan is often considered a draft bust. The majority of his career was spent in the minor professional hockey leagues. He signed in St John's in 1999–2000 to play for his hometown Maple Leafs but was never signed by Toronto themselves due to a contractual conflict with the Canadiens. In 2000, Ryan won the St. John's Maple Leafs Humanitarian of the Year Award; in 2003 he led the Orlando Seals with playoff goals (6) to help them win the league championship.

On January 14, 2024, his 47th birthday, Ryan signed a contract with the Newfoundland Growlers of the ECHL. Due to a shortened roster, Ryan would play for the team later that same day, his first game of professional hockey in over 20 years. He recorded 7 penalty minutes after instigating a fight with Zach Walker, in a 6–2 loss against the Adirondack Thunder.

== Ball hockey career ==
In 2003, 2005, 2007, 2009, 2011, and 2013 Ryan represented Canada at the ISBHF ball hockey tournament in Switzerland, Pittsburgh, Germany, Czech Republic, Slovakia, and Canada respectively. He led the team to a gold medal in ’03 and ’07, won a silver in 2011, and won a bronze medal representing Canada again at the 2013 Worlds in St John’s, NL, his hometown. In 2011 in Bratislava, Slovakia, Ryan was Canada’s leading scorer. He also has two national ball hockey championships to his credit (Montreal Black Knights, 2008, and Newfoundland Black Horse, 2010). In 2016, he reached the provincial ball hockey championship finals. In 2018, his team, Colonial Auto Parts from St. John’s, won the 2018 Canadian men’s masters championship, and his other team, Black Horse, took silver in the national ball hockey championships in the senior men’s A competition.

== Later life ==
Ryan has played Newfoundland senior hockey with the St. John’s Capitals and the Clarenville Caribous, who lost the 2014 Allan Cup final to the Dundas Real McCoys in overtime. He played with his hometown Mount Pearl Blades for two seasons, missing the playoffs both years. In 2006 he was named Top Scorer for the Avalon East League and the Newfoundland Provincial League; in 2007 he claimed the title of MVP and Avalon East Top Scorer. In 2008, he played with the Bentley Generals of the Alberta Senior Hockey League, winning a silver medal at the Allan Cup, and was named Top Scorer. Ryan is an avid baseball player in the summers, suiting up for the Mount Pearl Knights of the St John's men's baseball league. He also swims laps at the local swimming hole behind Agnes Pratt Mercy Home in Rennies River.

Ryan works in the film industry and has appeared on several episodes of the hit CBC television program Republic of Doyle, playing small roles. He has also played himself in the OLN's Road Hockey Rumble, and played Zombie #22 in Zack Snyder's Dawn of the Dead (2004). In addition to playing "British Soldier #1" (Episode 1) - (the first on-screen casualty in the Netflix/Discovery Channel television series Frontier, starring Jason Momoa in the lead role), in 2017 Ryan also had small roles in Frontier Season 2, Little Dog (CBC), Caught (CBC), Schitt's Creek, and various short films. He wrote and played the lead role in a short film called "A Stand In" due in 2018. He has made multiple appearances on the hockey podcast Spittin' Chiclets and most recently appeared in the eighth season of the Crave/Hulu show Letterkenny as a hockey player whose Newfie chirps annoyed the native team bench. He has a regular role in the Letterkenny spinoff Shoresy, and appears in the 2024 film Skeet.

Ryan, who has a bachelor of arts degree (Folklore/English), released his first book, Tales of a First Round Nothing, in May 2014, which was well-received by critics. He is now also trying his hand at stand-up comedy and performed his second show to good reviews opening for Gerry Dee at the General Motors Centre in Oshawa, Ontario on April 22, 2016.

In 2017 and 2021, Ryan unsuccessfully ran for city council in Mount Pearl.

== Career statistics ==
			Regular season					Playoffs
Season	Team	League	GP	G	A	Pts	PIM	GP	G	A	Pts	PIM
1991–92	Quesnel Millionaires	RMJHL	49	26	41	67	217	—	—	—	—	—
1992–93	Quesnel Millionaires	RMJHL	29	31	25	56	222	—	—	—	—	—
1992–93	Vernon Lakers	BCHL	9	5	6	11	15	—	—	—	—	—
1992–93	Tri-City Americans	WHL	1	0	0	0	0	1	0	1	1	5
1993–94	Tri-City Americans	WHL	61	16	17	33	176	4	0	1	1	25
1994–95	Tri-City Americans	WHL	70	50	60	110	207	17	12	15	27	36
1995–96	Tri-City Americans	WHL	59	32	37	69	133	5	0	0	0	4
1995–96	Fredericton Canadiens	AHL	—	—	—	—	—	3	0	0	0	2
1996–97	Red Deer Rebels	WHL	16	13	22	35	10	16	18	6	24	32
1996–97	Montreal Canadiens	NHL	3	0	0	0	0	—	—	—	—	—
1997–98	Fredericton Canadiens	AHL	71	21	18	39	256	3	1	1	2	0
1997–98	Montreal Canadiens	NHL	4	0	0	0	31	—	—	—	—	—
1998–99	Montreal Canadiens	NHL	1	0	0	0	5	—	—	—	—	—
1998–99	Fredericton Canadiens	AHL	55	16	27	43	189	11	1	3	4	10
1999–2000	Utah Grizzlies	IHL	6	0	3	3	24	—	—	—	—	—
1999–2000	Long Beach Ice Dogs	IHL	1	0	0	0	4	—	—	—	—	—
1999–2000	St. John's Maple Leafs	AHL	50	7	17	24	176	—	—	—	—	—
2000–01	Hershey Bears	AHL	8	0	1	1	36	—	—	—	—	—
2000–01	Colorado Gold Kings	WCHL	31	15	25	40	140	8	6	4	10	34
2001–02	Idaho Steelheads	WCHL	30	10	10	20	94	—	—	—	—	—
2002–03	Cincinnati Cyclones	ECHL	12	1	8	9	58	—	—	—	—	—
2002–03	Orlando Seals	ACHL	13	4	5	9	29	6	6	2	8	2
2007–08	Bentley Generals	ChHL	20	17	27	44	37	—	—	—	—	—
2008–09	Corner Brook Royals	WCSHL	22	17	30	47	14	6	1	2	3	9
2009–10	Corner Brook Royals	WCSHL	23	9	21	30	16	4	1	2	3	5
2011–12	Mount Pearl Blades	NLSHL	24	3	19	22	33	—	—	—	—	—
2012–13	Eastlink Cee Bee Stars	NLSHL	23	8	11	19	50	5	0	2	2	0
2013–14	Eastlink Cee Bee Stars	NLSHL	6	1	5	6	0	—	—	—	—	—
2013–14	Clarenville Caribous	NLSHL	18	6	6	12	15	9	0	1	1	34
2014–15	Clarenville Caribous	CWSHL	2	0	0	0	0	—	—	—	—	—
2014–15	Gander Flyers	CWSHL	11	1	5	6	9	2	0	0	0	43
2015–16	Gander Flyers	CWSHL	18	2	8	10	4	4	0	1	1	4
2016–17	St. John's Caps	ECSHL	6	7	5	12	0	—	—	—	—	—
2017–18	St. John's Caps	ECSHL	17	19	13	32	2	—	—	—	—	—
2018–19	St. John's Caps	ECSHL	12	5	11	16	4	1	1	0	1	2
2019–20	St. John's Caps	ECSHL	12	8	11	19	23	1	1	0	1	0
2021–22	St. John's Caps	AESHL	4	0	3	3	0	2	0	0	0	0
2023–24	Newfoundland Growlers	ECHL	1	0	0	0	7	—	—	—	—	–
AHL totals			184	44	63	107	657	17	2	4	6	12
NHL totals			8	0	0	0	36	—	—	—	—	—

== Awards ==
- WHL West Second All-Star Team – 1995

Preceded by Brad Brown	Montreal Canadiens first-round draft pick 1995	Succeeded by Matt Higgins
