= List of NSHL seasons =

This is a list of seasons of the Newfoundland Senior Hockey League (NSHL), a senior ice hockey league, that operated from 1962 to 1989. The list also includes the seasons of the Newfoundland Amateur Hockey Association (NAHA), the predecessor organization of the NSHL.

== NSHL Seasons 1962–1989 ==
No.	Season	Playoffs	Finals	Reg. season games	Start (reg. season)	Finish (incl. playoffs)	Top record	Champion
1	1962–63	1963	1963	16			Buchans Miners (16–9–5–2)	Buchans Miners
2	1963–64	1964	1964	20			Corner Brook Royals (20-16–4–0)	Corner Brook Royals
3	1964–65	1965	1965	20			Conception Bay CeeBees (20–17–2–1)	Conception Bay CeeBees
4	1965–66	1966	1966	32			Corner Brook Royals (32–22–9–1)	Corner Brook Royals
5	1966–67	1967	1967	40			Gander Flyers (40–26–3–1)	Conception Bay CeeBees
6	1967–68	1968	1968	40			Grand Falls Cataracts (40–21–15–4)	Corner Brook Royals
7	1968–69	1969	1969	40			Gander Flyers (40–27–10–3)	Gander Flyers
8	1969–70	1970	1970	40			St. John's Capitals (40–23–14–3)	St. John's Capitals
9	1970–71	1971	1971	36			St. John's Capitals (36–19–13–4)	Grand Falls Cataracts
10	1971–72	1972	1972	36			Grand Falls Cataracts (36–25–8–3)	Grand Falls Cataracts
11	1972–73	1973	1973	36			Corner Brook Royals (36–23–12–1)	St. John's Capitals
12	1973–74	1974	1974	32			St. John's Capitals (32–27–4–1)	St. John's Capitals
13	1974–75	1975	1975	16			St. John's Capitals (16–12–2–2)	St. John's Capitals
14	1975–76	1976	1976	20			St. John's Capitals (12–8–2–2)	St. John's Capitals
15	1976–77	1977	1977	32 West, 26 East				Corner Brook Royals
16	1977–78	1978	1978	32 West, 28 East				St. John's Blue Caps
17	1978–79	1979	1979	30				St. John's Mike's Shamrocks
18	1979–80	1980	1980	34				Gander Flyers
19	1980–81	1981	1981	32				Grand Falls Cataracts
20	1981–82	1982	1982	32				Grand Falls Cataracts
21	1982–83	1983	1983	32				Stephenville Jets
22	1983–84	1984	1984	40				Stephenville Jets
23	1984–85	1985	1985	36				Corner Brook Royals
24	1985–86	1986	1986	41				Corner Brook Royals
25	1986–87	1987	1987	44				St. John's Capitals
26	1987–88	1988	1988	48				Corner Brook Royals
27	1988–89	1989	1989	48				Port aux Basques Mariners
