= Humber Gardens =

Ice arena in Corner Brook, Newfoundland

The Humber Gardens was a former ice arena in Corner Brook, Newfoundland and Labrador located at 137 O'Connell Drive. It was the first rink in Corner Brook with an artificial ice surface.

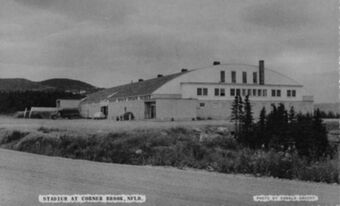
The Humber Gardens in 1955

== Construction ==
A new arena for Corner Brook was discussed as early 1944 but the real planning started soon after the opening of the new Grand Falls Stadium and with the planned Memorial Stadium in St. John's. A number of fundraisers were organized by the Humber Gardens Committee and the people of Corner Brook including selling shares in the new rink to the public. The committee lobbied the provincial government for assistance and as a result were given a $100,000 interest-free loan in the fall of 1954. The cornerstone was paid on December 12, 1954, by H. Montgomery Lewin, then general manager of Bowater's operations in Corner Brook and was completed at the end of March 1955. When complete, the new arena could hold over 3,000 spectators.

Jack Marshall was the first president of Humber Gardens in 1955.

== Opening ==
The first hockey game played in the new arena was an exhibition game between the Grand Falls senior Bees and the Bell Island senior B all-star team. Humber Gardens was officially opened on September 22, 1955.

== Corner Brook Royals ==
Humber Gardens was the home of the provincial senior hockey's Corner Brook Royals until 1997 when it was replaced by the Pepsi Centre.

== Closure ==
The former arena was purchased by the Coleman Group of Companies. It is currently occupied by a Coleman's grocery store and an NLC Liquor Store.
