= Joe Lundrigan =

Canadian ice hockey player

- Born: August 23, 1948 (age 76); Corner Brook, Dominion of Newfoundland
- Height: 5 ft 11 in (180 cm)
- Weight: 180 lb (82 kg; 12 st 12 lb)
- Position: Defence
- Shot: Left
- Played for: Toronto Maple Leafs; Washington Capitals
- Playing career: 1967–1975

Joseph Roche Lundrigan (born September 12, 1948) is a Canadian former ice hockey defenceman who played 52 games in the National Hockey League with the Toronto Maple Leafs and Washington Capitals during the 1972–73 and 1974–75 seasons. He was originally signed in 1971 by the Maple Leafs, and was claimed by the Capitals in the 1974 NHL Expansion Draft. The rest of his career, which lasted from 1967 to 1986, was spent in the minor leagues.

== Playing career ==
As a youth, he played in the 1960 and 1961 Quebec International Pee-Wee Hockey Tournaments with Corner Brook. He won two all-Newfoundland senior hockey championships with the Corner Brook Royals in 1968 and 1977. In 1971–72 with the Tulsa Oilers of the Central Hockey League, he was voted as the club’s top defenceman and named to the league’s second all-star team. He was inducted into the Newfoundland and Labrador Hockey Hall of Fame in 1995. His # 2 jersey was retired by the Corner Brook Royals.

== Career statistics ==
=== Regular season and playoffs ===
			Regular season					Playoffs
Season	Team	League	GP	G	A	Pts	PIM	GP	G	A	Pts	PIM
1967–68	Corner Brook Royals	NFSHL	28	1	10	11	33	12	1	1	2	14
1967–68	Corner Brook Royals	Al-Cup	—	—	—	—	—	8	0	1	1	6
1968–69	St. Francis Xavier University	CIAU	20	14	11	25	50	—	—	—	—	—
1969–70	St. Francis Xavier University	CIAU	20	10	6	16	73	—	—	—	—	—
1970–71	St. Francis Xavier University	CIAU	10	6	13	19	56	—	—	—	—	—
1971–72	Tulsa Oilers	CHL	67	3	34	37	110	13	2	9	11	24
1972–73	Toronto Maple Leafs	NHL	49	2	8	10	20	—	—	—	—	—
1972–73	Tulsa Oilers	CHL	8	3	2	5	10	—	—	—	—	—
1973–74	Oklahoma City Blazers	CHL	62	7	34	41	143	10	0	3	3	10
1974–75	Washington Capitals	NHL	3	0	0	0	2	—	—	—	—	—
1974–75	Richmond Robins	AHL	28	3	3	6	49	—	—	—	—	—
1974–75	Hershey Bears	AHL	33	6	13	19	60	12	2	4	6	8
1975–76	Corner Brook Royals	NFSHL	—	5	14	19	59	—	—	—	—	—
1976–77	Corner Brook Royals	NFSHL	32	13	34	47	43	10	4	10	14	4
1977–78	Corner Brook Royals	NFSHL	10	3	5	8	0	—	—	—	—	—
1977–78	Labrador City Carol Lakers	NFSHL	16	5	28	33	72	—	—	—	—	—
1978–79	Corner Brook Royals	NFSHL	19	16	17	33	72	—	—	—	—	—
1979–80	Corner Brook Royals	NFSHL	—	1	0	1	26	—	—	—	—	—
1983–84	Corner Brook Royals	NFSHL	23	8	12	20	27	—	—	—	—	—
1985–86	Stephenville Jets	NFSHL	6	0	3	3	2	—	—	—	—	—
NHL totals			52	2	8	10	22	—	—	—	—	—
