= Arron Asham =

Canadian ice hockey player (born 1978)

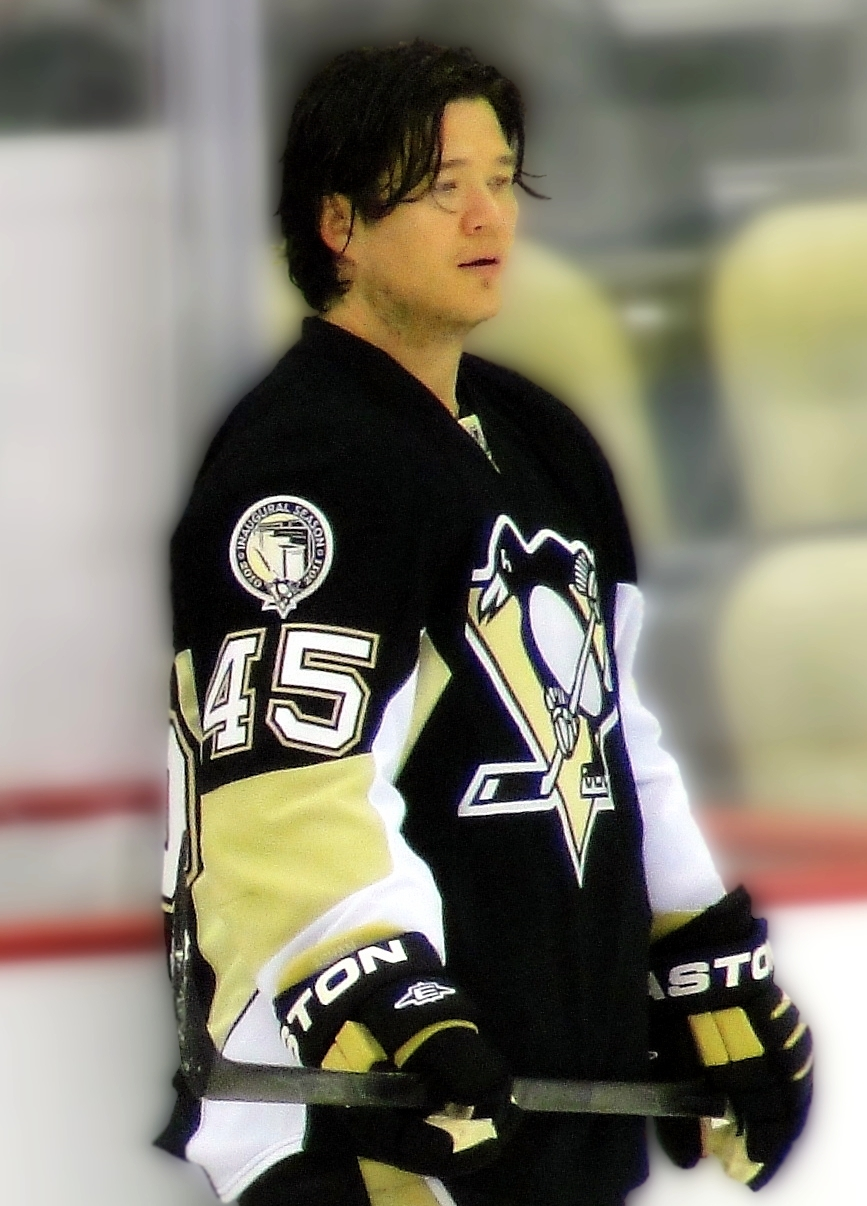
- Asham with the Pittsburgh Penguins in 2011
- Born: April 13, 1978 (age 48) Portage la Prairie, Manitoba, Canada
- Height: 5 ft 11 in (180 cm)
- Weight: 205 lb (93 kg; 14 st 9 lb)
- Position: Right wing
- Shot: Right
- Played for: Montreal Canadiens; New York Islanders; New Jersey Devils; Philadelphia Flyers; Pittsburgh Penguins; New York Rangers
- NHL draft: 71st overall, 1996; Montreal Canadiens
- Playing career: 1998–2014

Arron Miles Asham (born April 13, 1978) is a Canadian former professional ice hockey player who played 15 seasons in the National Hockey League (NHL). Over his 15 seasons, he played for 6 different teams.

== Playing career ==
Asham was drafted 71st overall by the Montreal Canadiens in the 1996 NHL entry draft and made his NHL debut with Montreal during the 1998–99 season. After parts of four seasons with Montreal, he was traded to the New York Islanders on June 22, 2002, along with a 2002 5th round draft pick for Mariusz Czerkawski. After years of going back and forth between the Canadiens and their American Hockey League affiliate, Asham became a mainstay in the Islanders line-up with his most productive offensive season to date coming during his first season with his new team in 2002–03, when he scored 15 goals and 19 assists for 34 points in 78 games. After four seasons with the Islanders, Asham signed a one-year contract with the New Jersey Devils on August 7, 2007.

After the 2007–08 season, Asham became a free agent again, this time signing a two-year contract with the Philadelphia Flyers on July 7, 2008. On signing with the Flyers, Asham said, "I've always loved the way the Flyers play and I fit in here. They play hard every night. They play tough hockey and I've always admired that. I always thought I should play here and when the chance came up last summer to come here, I thought it was the best place for me and a place where I'd really have a chance to win a Stanley Cup in the next couple of years."

In the 2010 playoffs, Asham scored four goals as the Flyers defied expectations and reached the Stanley Cup Finals for the first time since 1997. His biggest goal came in Game 5 of the Eastern Conference Finals vs. Montreal when he scored in the 2nd period to give the Flyers a 2–1 lead of an eventual 4–2 victory that eliminated the Canadiens and propelled the Flyers into a Finals matchup against the Chicago Blackhawks. Asham netted one goal in the finals as the Flyers lost to the Blackhawks 4 games to 2.

As a free agent that summer, Asham left the Flyers and signed a one-year contract worth $700,000 with the Pittsburgh Penguins on August 20, 2010. During the following off-season, the contract was extended for another year.

During Game 3 of the 2012 NHL Eastern Conference quarterfinals, in retaliation to a hit on a teammate, Asham cross-checked Brayden Schenn of the Philadelphia Flyers in the upper body, and then threw a punch while Schenn was down on the ice. Schenn sustained no apparent injury due to the hit. For his actions, Asham received a four-game suspension, his first disciplinary action from the NHL Commissioner since joining the NHL.

As a free agent from the Penguins, Asham signed a two-year contract with the New York Rangers on July 1, 2012. With this, Asham had played for all 5 teams in the Atlantic Division during his career. On February 10, 2013, Asham scored his first goal as a Ranger in a 5–1 victory over the Tampa Bay Lightning, which made Asham the only player to score a goal with every Atlantic Division team. On May 13, 2013, he scored the series-winning goal in Game 7 of the 2013 Stanley Cup playoffs to push the Rangers into the second round and eliminate the Washington Capitals.

Asham saw limited action with the Rangers during the 2013–14 season, playing in only six games. He spent most of the season with the Hartford Wolf Pack. The Rangers did not offer to extend Asham's contract and on July 1, 2014, he became an unrestricted free agent, effectively ending his professional career.

In September 2015, Asham signed an amateur playing contract with the Gander Flyers of the Central West Senior Hockey League.

== Personal life ==
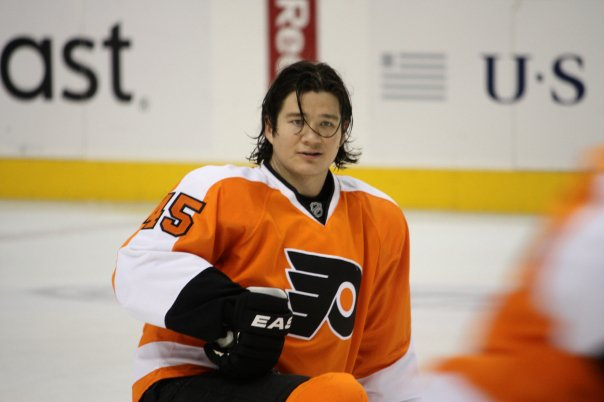
Arron Asham with the Flyers.

Asham's hometown is Portage La Prairie. He has 4 children: daughters Azilyn and Oceane, and sons Dexter and Cruz. Asham is Métis.

Asham also has his own charity called "Arron's Chance to Play Hockey" (chance2play.com) This foundation's mission is to work in partnership with the community to provide opportunities that will enhance the emotional, physical, social and intellectual well-being of children. The overall goal is to enhance the lives of children and families.

== Career statistics ==
=== Regular season and playoffs ===
			Regular season					Playoffs
Season	Team	League	GP	G	A	Pts	PIM	GP	G	A	Pts	PIM
1994–95	Red Deer Rebels	WHL	62	11	16	27	126	—	—	—	—	—
1995–96	Red Deer Rebels	WHL	70	32	45	77	174	10	6	3	9	20
1996–97	Red Deer Rebels	WHL	67	45	51	96	149	16	12	14	26	36
1997–98	Red Deer Rebels	WHL	67	43	49	92	153	5	0	2	2	8
1997–98	Fredericton Canadiens	AHL	2	1	1	2	0	2	0	1	1	0
1998–99	Montreal Canadiens	NHL	7	0	0	0	0	—	—	—	—	—
1998–99	Fredericton Canadiens	AHL	60	16	18	34	118	13	8	6	14	11
1999–2000	Quebec Citadelles	AHL	13	4	5	9	32	2	0	0	0	2
1999–2000	Montreal Canadiens	NHL	33	4	2	6	24	—	—	—	—	—
2000–01	Quebec Citadelles	AHL	15	7	9	16	51	7	1	2	3	2
2000–01	Montreal Canadiens	NHL	46	2	3	5	59	—	—	—	—	—
2001–02	Montreal Canadiens	NHL	35	5	4	9	55	3	0	1	1	0
2001–02	Quebec Citadelles	AHL	24	9	14	23	35	—	—	—	—	—
2002–03	New York Islanders	NHL	78	15	19	34	57	5	0	0	0	16
2003–04	New York Islanders	NHL	79	12	12	24	92	5	0	1	1	4
2004–05	EHC Visp	NLB	5	2	4	6	6	4	1	1	2	8
2005–06	New York Islanders	NHL	63	9	15	24	103	—	—	—	—	—
2006–07	New York Islanders	NHL	80	11	12	23	63	5	1	0	1	0
2007–08	New Jersey Devils	NHL	77	6	4	10	84	5	0	1	1	2
2008–09	Philadelphia Flyers	NHL	78	8	12	20	155	6	1	1	2	6
2009–10	Philadelphia Flyers	NHL	72	10	14	24	126	23	4	3	7	10
2010–11	Pittsburgh Penguins	NHL	44	5	6	11	46	7	3	1	4	2
2011–12	Pittsburgh Penguins	NHL	64	5	11	16	76	3	0	0	0	10
2012–13	New York Rangers	NHL	27	2	0	2	50	10	2	0	2	6
2013–14	New York Rangers	NHL	6	0	0	0	14	—	—	—	—	—
2013–14	Hartford Wolf Pack	AHL	25	3	2	5	32	—	—	—	—	—
2015–16	Gander Flyers	CWSHL	15	11	10	21	18	3	0	3	3	13
2015–16	Grand Falls-Windsor Cataracts	AC	—	—	—	—	—	3	0	1	1	2
2016–17	Boutouche JCs	AC	—	—	—	—	—	2	1	0	1	2
AHL totals			139	40	49	89	268	24	9	9	18	15
NHL totals			789	94	114	208	1004	72	11	8	19	56

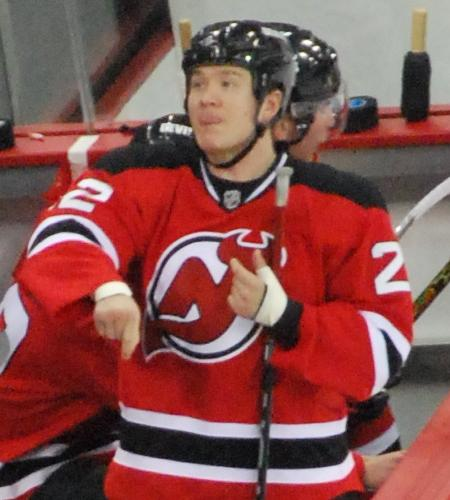
Asham playing for the New Jersey Devils during the 2007–08 season.

=== International ===
Year	Team	Event	Result	GP	G	A	Pts	PIM
1995	Canada	PC	1st place, gold medalist(s)	5	2	3	5	4
Junior totals				5	2	3	5	4

== Transactions ==
- On June 22, 1996, the Montreal Canadiens selected Arron Asham in the third-round (#71 overall) of the 1996 NHL draft.
- On September 10, 1997, the Montreal Canadiens signed Arron Asham to a 3-year contract.
- On August 1, 2001, the Montreal Canadiens re-signed restricted free agent Arron Asham to a 1-year contract.
- On June 22, 2002, the Montreal Canadiens traded Arron Asham and a 2002 fifth-round pick (#149-Markus Pahlsson) to the New York Islanders in exchange for Mariusz Czerkawski.
- On July 18, 2003, the New York Islanders re-signed Arron Asham to a 2-year contract.
- On January 19, 2005, the Visp (Swiss-2) signed Arron Asham.
- On August 15, 2005, the New York Islanders re-signed restricted free agent Arron Asham to a 1-year contract.
- On July 24, 2006, the New York Islanders re-signed restricted free agent Arron Asham to a 1-year contract.
- On August 7, 2007, the New Jersey Devils signed unrestricted free agent Arron Asham.
- On July 1, 2008, the New Jersey Devils released Arron Asham.
- On July 7, 2008, the Philadelphia Flyers signed unrestricted free agent Arron Asham to a multi-year contract.
- On August 20, 2010, the Pittsburgh Penguins signed unrestricted free agent Arron Asham to a 1-year contract.
- On June 29, 2011, the Pittsburgh Penguins re-signed Arron Asham to a 1-year contract.
- On July 1, 2012, the New York Rangers signed unrestricted free agent Arron Asham to a 2-year contract.
