= St. John's Capitals =

- City: St. John's, Newfoundland and Labrador
- League: Newfoundland Senior Hockey League
- Founded: 1955
- Home arena: Memorial Stadium (St. John's)
- Colours: Red, white

Franchise history
- 1955–1956: St. John's All-Stars
- 1956–1990: St. John's Capitals

St. John's Capitals were a senior ice hockey team based in St. John's, Newfoundland and Labrador in the Newfoundland Senior Hockey League.

== Seasons and records ==
=== Season-by-season results ===
Led league in points†	Herder Trophy champions‡

Note: GP = Games played, W = Wins, L = Losses, T = Ties, OTL = Overtime Losses, Pts = Points, GF = Goals for, GA = Goals against, DNQ = Did not qualify

NAHA, Sr.B = Newfoundland Amateur Hockey Association senior Section B, NAHA, Sr. = Newfoundland senior "league", NSHL = Newfoundland Senior Hockey League

St. John's Capitals regular season and postseason statistics and results, 1955–1990
Season	League	Regular season									Postseason					
Season	League	GP	W	L	T	OTL	GF	GA	PTS	Finish	GP	W	L	GF	GA	Result
1954–55	NAHA, Sr.B	–	–	–	–	–	–	–	–	–	2	0	2	13	17	Lost Section B eastern finals to Bell Island All-Stars, 0-2
1955–56	NAHA, Sr.B	–	–	–	–	–	–	–	–	–	3	1	2	14	31	Lost Section B eastern finals to Bell Island All-Stars, 1-2
1956–57	NAHA, Sr.B	–	–	–	–	–	–	–	–	–	2	0	2	6	11	Lost Section B eastern finals to Bell Island All-Stars, 0-2
1957–58	NAHA, Sr.B	–	–	–	–	–	–	–	–	–	9	4	5	29	40	Lost Section B finals to Grand Falls Bees, 1-4
1958–59	NAHA, Sr.B					–		–	–	–	10	6	4	54	37	Lost Section B finals by default to Grand Falls Bees, 3–4
1959–60	NAHA, Sr.	8	0	8	0	–			0	3rd, East						DNQ for Herder playoffs
1960–61	NAHA, Sr.	8	2	6		–			4	2nd, East						DNQ for Herder playoffs
1961–62	NSHL	–	–	–	–	–	–	–	–	–	–	–	–	–	–	Did not enter Herder round robin playoffs
1962–63	NSHL	16	3	11	2	-	63	105	8	5th						DNQ for Herder playoffs
1963–64	NSHL	20	13	7	0	-	108	90	26	3rd						semi-final forfeited to Corner Brook Royals
1964–65	–	–	–	–	–	–	–	–	–	–	–	–	–	–	–	Did not enter the NSHL
1965–66	NSHL	32	9	22	1	–	120	209	19	5th						DNQ for Herder playoffs
1966–67	NSHL	40	15	22	3	–	146	162	33	5th						DNQ for Herder playoffs
1967–68	NSHL	40	18	17	5	–	173	180	41	5th						DNQ for Herder playoffs
1968–69	NSHL	40	18	18	4	–	176	172	40	4th						Lost in Herder semi-finals to Buchans Miners, 1–4
1969–70	NSHL	40	23	14	3	198	198	158	49†	1st						Won Herder Memorial Trophy vs. Gander Flyers, 4-3‡
1970–71	NSHL	36	19	13	4	–	180	143	42†	1st	19	9	10			Lost Herder finals to Grand Falls Cataracts, 3–4
1971–72	NSHL	36	15	9	2	–	183	178	32	3rd	12	3	9			Lost Herder finals to Grand Falls Cataracts, 0–4
1972–73	NSHL	36	18	17	1	–	170	157	37	2nd	12	9	3			Won Herder Memorial Trophy vs. Grand Falls Cataracts, 4-0‡
1973–74	NSHL	32	27	4	1	–	204	113	42†	1st						Won Herder Memorial Trophy vs. Grand Falls Cataracts, 4-1‡
1974–75	NSHL	16	12	2	2	–	115	62	26†	1st						Won Herder Memorial Trophy vs. , ‡
1975–76	NSHL	12	8	2	2	–	84	40	30†	1st						Won Herder Memorial Trophy vs. Grand Falls Cataracts, 4-1‡
1989–90	NFLD, Sr.				–											Won Herder Memorial Trophy vs. Corner Brook Royals, 4-0‡

Labatt BlueCaps regular season and postseason statistics and results, 1976-1982
Season	League	Regular season									Postseason					
Season	League	GP	W	L	T	OTL	GF	GA	PTS	Finish	GP	W	L	GF	GA	Result
1976–77	NSHL					–			31	1st, East						
1977–78	NSHL					–			51	1st, East						Won Herder Memorial Trophy vs. Gander Flyers, 4-3‡
1978–79	NSHL					–			43	2nd						
1979–80	NSHL					–			41	2nd						
1980–81	NSHL					–			43	1st						
1981–82	NSHL					–			11	5th						

Mike's Shamrocks regular season and postseason statistics and results, 1976-1982
Season	League	Regular season									Postseason					
Season	League	GP	W	L	T	OTL	GF	GA	PTS	Finish	GP	W	L	GF	GA	Result
1976–77	NSHL					–			29	2nd East						
1977–78	NSHL					–			26	3rd, East						
1978–79	NSHL					–			32	3rd						Won Herder Memorial Trophy vs. Gander Flyers, 4-3‡
1979–80	NSHL					–			34	4th						
1980–81	NSHL					–			28	4th						
1981–82	NSHL					–			29	4th						

== Allan Cup results ==
Season	Location	GP	W	L	T	OTL	GF	GA	Results	Playoffs
1970					-	-			Lost in Eastern semi-finals to Victoriaville Tigres, 1-3	
1973					-	-			Lost in Eastern semi-finals to Thunder Bay Twins, 1-3	
1974					-	-			Lost in Eastern semi-finals to Thunder Bay Twins, 0-3	
1975	Memorial Stadium (St. John's)				-	-			Lost in Eastern finals to Barrie Flyers, 1-3	

== Leaders ==
=== Captains ===
- Lloyd Cooke, 1956–57
- Hugh Fardy, 1957–58
- Bern Goobie, 1958–59

=== Coaches ===
- Howie Meeker, 1957–59, 1966–67
- Jack Vinnicombe, 1957–58
- Bob Badcock, 1972–73
- George Faulkner, 1975–76
- Bill Riley, 1985-86 (playing-coach)

== Trophies and awards ==
=== Team awards ===
- All-Newfoundland senior hockey championships (Herder Memorial Trophy): 1970, 1973, 1974, 1975, 1976, 1978 (as Bluecaps), 1979 (as Mike's Shamrocks), 1987, 1990
- First place in Newfoundland Senior Hockey League regular season (Evening Telegram Trophy): 1970, 1971, 1974, 1975, 1976, 1978 (as BlueCaps), 1987, 1988, 1989, 1996

=== Individual awards ===
S. E. Tuma Memorial Trophy (Top scorer in the regular season)

- Randy Pearcey, 1978, 1981 (BlueCaps)
- Andy Sullivan, 1987, 1989

T.A. (Gus) Soper Memorial Award (MVP in the regular season)

Albert "Peewee" Crane Memorial Trophy (Senior league rookie of the year)

- Bruce Butler, 1970
- Gary Connolly, 1973
- Glen Critch, 1975
- John Breen, 1979 (Shamrocks)
- Mac Tucker, 1980 (BlueCaps)
- Roger Kennedy, 1981
- Peter White, 1987

Howie Clouter memorial Trophy (Most sportsmanlike player in the regular season)

- Hubert Hutton, 1976

President's Goaltender's Award (Top goaltender in the regular season)

- Edgar (Eg) Billiard, 1970, 1971
- Tols Chapman, 1974, 1975
- Pat Dempsey, 1976, 1978, 1979
- Roger Kennedy, 1981, 1988, 1989
- Peter White, 1987

Cliff Gorman Memorial Award (Most valuable player of the Herder Playoffs)

- Roger Kennedy, 1983
- Andy Sullivan, 1987

== Honoured members ==
=== NL Hockey Hall of Fame ===
The following people that were associated with the Capitals have been inducted into the Newfoundland and Labrador Hockey Hall of Fame.

- George Faulkner, 1994
- Hugh Fardy, 1997
- Stan Breen, 1997
- Bob Badcock, 2000
- Merv Green, 2000
- Randy Pearcey, 2002
- Jim Penney, 2002
- Stan Cook, 2004
- Howie Meeker, 2004
- Eg Billard, 2008
