= Stephenville Jets =

- City: Stephenville, NL
- League: Newfoundland Senior Hockey League, West Coast Senior Hockey League
- Founded: 1975
- Operated: 1975–1989, 2000-2002, 2017-Present.
- Home arena: Stephenville Gardens, 1975-1989; Stephenvile Dome, 2000-Present
- Colours: Blue, white

The Stephenville Jets are a senior ice hockey team based in Stephenville, Newfoundland and Labrador and part of the Newfoundland Senior Hockey League.

== History ==
The Jets hockey club was founded as the Stephenville Monarchs in 1975. The Monarchs joined the Newfoundland Senior Hockey League (NSHL) for the 1975-76 season. The team changed their name before following season to the Stephenville Jets

Hector Caines was the first coach for the Monarchs who debuted in Corner Brook on November 15. 1975 losing 8-4 to the hometown Royals. The club made their debut at their home rink, the Stephenville Gardens, on November 16. At the end of their inaugural season, the Monarchs finished in last place with 8 points. Beginning with the 1982-83 season, the Jets won four straight Evening Telegram Trophies for finishing first place in the regular season.

The Jets were back-to-back winners of the Herder Memorial Trophy in 1983 and 1984 as all-Newfoundland senior hockey champions.

The Stephenville Jets were deeply in debt after the 1988-89 season and folded prior to the next season.

== Seasons and records ==
=== Season-by-season results ===
Led league in points†	Herder Trophy champions‡

Note: GP = Games played, W = Wins, L = Losses, T = Ties, OTL = Overtime Losses, Pts = Points, GF = Goals for, GA = Goals against, DNQ = Did not qualify

NSHL = Newfoundland Senior Hockey League

Stephenville Monarchs/Jets regular season and postseason statistics and results, 1975-1989
Season	League	Regular season									Postseason				
Season	League	GP	W	L	T	GF	GA	PTS	Finish	GP	W	L	GF	GA	Result
1975-76	NSHL	20	3	15	2	76	149	8	4th						
1976-77	NSHL	32	10	21	1	134	239	21	4th, West						
1977-78	NSHL	32	11	20	1	158	217	23	5th, West						
1978-79	NSHL	30	4	23	3	132	266	11	6th						
1979-80	NSHL	34	8	25	1	124	225	17	7th						
1980-81	Did not enter														
1981-82	NSHL	28	13	13	2	144	145	32	3rd						
1982-83	NSHL	32	25	6	1	227	106	51†	1st	10	7	3	45	24	Won Herder Memorial Trophy vs. Grand Falls Cataracts, 4-3‡
1983-84	NSHL	39	23	13	3	209	169	49†	1st	8	7	1	58	30	Won Herder Memorial Trophy vs. Corner Brook Royals, ‡
1984-85	NSHL	36	27	5	4	260	139	58†	1st						
1985-86	NSHL	41	32	8	1	269	175	65†	1st						
1986-87	NSHL	44	25	16	3	251	209	53	2nd						
1987-88	NSHL	48	26	19	3	307	247	55	3rd						
1988-89	NSHL	47	13	31	3	181	284	21.75	4th						

== Allan Cup Results ==
Year	Location	GP	W	L	T	OTL	GF	GA	Results	Playoffs
1983										Lost in Eastern playdowns to Cambridge Hornets, 2-3
1984	Cambridge, Ontario									Lost in Eastern playdowns to Cambridge Hornets, 1-3

== Leaders ==
=== Head coaches ===
- Hector Caines, 1975-76
- Mike Power, 1979-80
- Don Howse, 1981-82 to 1986-87 (playing-coach)
- Brian Abbey, 1986-87
- Kevin-Morrison, 1987-88 to 1988-89 (playing-coach)
- Cal Dunville, 1988-89
- Heber Rideout, 1988-89

== Trophies and awards ==
=== Team awards ===
- Two all-Newfoundland senior hockey championships (Herder Memorial Trophy): 1983, 1984
- Four straight first-place finishes in Newfoundland Senior Hockey League regular season (Evening Telegram Trophy): 1983, 1984, 1985, 1986

=== Individual awards ===
S. E Tuma Memorial Trophy (Top scorer in the regular season)

- Bruce Campbell, 1983

T.A. (Gus) Soper Memorial Award (MVP in the regular season)

- Gary Dunville, 1984
- Zane Forbes, 1985

Albert "Peewee" Crane Memorial Trophy (Senior league rookie of the year)

- Cal Dunville, 1976
- Juan Strickland, 1983

Howie Clouter memorial Trophy (Most sportsmanlike player in the regular season)

- Juan Strickland, 1983
- Wayne Dove, 1984
- Andy Sullivan, 1985, 1986

President's Goaltender's Award (Top goaltender in the regular season)

- Gary Dunville, 1983, 1984, 1985

== Honoured Members ==
=== NL Hockey Hall of Fame ===
The following people associated with the Jets have been inducted into the Newfoundland and Labrador Hockey Hall of Fame.

- Cal Dunville, 1997
- Don Howse, 2000
- Zane Forbes, 2000
- Andy Sullivan, 2005
- Kevin Morrison, 2018
