= 2015 Canadian Junior Curling Championships – Men's tournament =

2015 Canadian Junior Curling Championships Men's tournament
- Host city: Corner Brook, Newfoundland and Labrador
- Arena: Corner Brook Civic Centre; Corner Brook Curling Club
- Dates: January 24–February 1
- Winner: Manitoba
- Curling club: Deer Lodge CC, Winnipeg
- Skip: Braden Calvert
- Third: Kyle Kruz
- Second: Lucas van den Bosch
- Lead: Brendan Wilson
- Finalist: Saskatchewan (Jacob Hersikorn)

The men's tournament of the 2015 M&M Meat Shops Canadian Junior Curling Championships will be held from January 24 to February 1 at the Corner Brook Civic Centre and the Corner Brook Curling Club.

== Teams ==
The teams are listed as follows:

Province	Skip	Third	Second	Lead	Club(s)
Alberta	Karsten Sturmay	Tristan Steinke	Brett Winfield	Mac Lenton	Avonair CC, Edmonton
British Columbia	Paul Henderson	Duncan Silversides	Benton Boychuk-Chorne	Tim Henderson	Victoria CC, Victoria
Manitoba	Braden Calvert	Kyle Kurz	Lucas van den Bosch	Brendan Wilson	Deer Lodge CC, Winnipeg
New Brunswick	Rene Comeau	Andrew Burgess	Alex MacNeil	Ryan Freeze	Capital WC, Fredericton
Newfoundland and Labrador	Greg Smith	Ryan McNeil Lamswood	Kyle Barron	Craig Laing	Caribou CC, Stephenville
Northwest Territories	Matthew Miller	Deklen Crocker	Logan Gagnier	Braden Picek	Inuvik CC, Inuvik
Northern Ontario	Tanner Horgan	Jacob Horgan	Connor Lawes	Maxime Blais	Idylwylde G&CC, Sudbury
Nova Scotia	Matthew Manuel	Nick Zachernuk	Ryan Abraham	Alec Cameron	Mayflower CC, Halifax
Nunavut	Kane Komaksiutiksak	Tyson Komaksiutiksak	Sidney Nichol	Darren Makkigak	Qavik CC, Rankin Inlet
Ontario	Mac Calwell	Kurt Armstrong	Morgan Calwell	Matt Pretty	Quinte CC, Belleville
Prince Edward Island	Tyler Smith	Brooks Roche	Dylan Lowery	Ryan Lowery	Montague CC, Montague; Crapaud CC, Crapaud
Saskatchewan	Jacob Hersikorn	Cole Tenetuik	Brady Kendel	Brandon Leippi	Sutherland CC, Saskatoon
Quebec	Félix Asselin	Alex Cormier	Lewis South	Émile Asselin	Glenmore CC, Dollard-des-Ormeaux
Yukon	Joe Wallingham	Brayden Klassen	Trygg Jensen	Spencer Wallace	Whitehorse CC, Whitehorse

== Round-robin standings ==
Final round-robin standings

Key
Teams to Championship Pool
Teams to Tie-Breakers

Pool A	Skip	W	L
Quebec	Félix Asselin	6	0
Manitoba	Braden Calvert	5	1
British Columbia	Paul Henderson	4	2
Nova Scotia	Matthew Manuel	2	4
Newfoundland and Labrador	Greg Smith	2	4
Ontario	Mac Calwell	2	4
Nunavut	Kane Komaksiutiksak	0	6

Pool B	Skip	W	L
Alberta	Karsten Sturmay	5	1
Saskatchewan	Jacob Hersikorn	5	1
New Brunswick	Rene Comeau	5	1
Northern Ontario	Tanner Horgan	2	4
Prince Edward Island	Tyler Smith	2	4
Yukon	Joe Wallingham	2	4
Northwest Territories	Matthew Miller	0	6

== Round-robin results ==
All draw times are listed in Newfoundland Standard Time (UTC−3:30).

=== Pool A ===
==== Draw 1 ====
Saturday, January 24, 10:00 am

Sheet D	1	2	3	4	5	6	7	8	9	10	Final
Newfoundland and Labrador (G. Smith)	0	0	0	1	0	0	0	1	0	X	2
Nova Scotia (Manuel) 🔨	0	0	2	0	0	1	2	0	3	X	8

Sheet E	1	2	3	4	5	6	7	8	9	10	Final
Nunavut (Komaksiutiksak)	0	0	0	2	0	0	0	0	0	1	3
Ontario (Calwell) 🔨	0	5	2	0	2	0	4	1	2	0	16

Sheet F	1	2	3	4	5	6	7	8	9	10	Final
British Columbia (Henderson) 🔨	1	0	0	0	1	1	2	0	1	X	6
Quebec (Asselin)	0	0	3	0	0	0	0	6	0	X	9

==== Draw 2 ====
Saturday, January 24, 2:30 pm

Sheet E	1	2	3	4	5	6	7	8	9	10	Final
Quebec (Asselin)	0	0	2	0	1	0	1	2	2	X	8
Manitoba (Calvert) 🔨	0	2	0	1	0	3	0	0	0	X	6

==== Draw 3 ====
Saturday, January 24, 7:30 pm

Sheet E	1	2	3	4	5	6	7	8	9	10	Final
Newfoundland and Labrador (G. Smith)	0	0	1	1	0	3	1	2	X	X	8
Ontario (Calwell) 🔨	1	1	0	0	1	0	0	0	X	X	3

==== Draw 4 ====
Sunday, January 25, 10:00 am

Sheet A	1	2	3	4	5	6	7	8	9	10	Final
Quebec (Asselin) 🔨	4	0	2	2	1	2	1	2	0	3	17
Nunavut (Komaksiutiksak)	0	1	0	0	0	0	0	0	1	0	2

Sheet B	1	2	3	4	5	6	7	8	9	10	Final
Nova Scotia (Manuel)	0	0	0	1	0	0	2	1	1	0	5
Manitoba (Calvert) 🔨	0	0	2	0	2	1	0	0	0	1	6

Sheet C	1	2	3	4	5	6	7	8	9	10	Final
Ontario (Calwell)	0	0	1	0	1	0	1	0	1	0	4
British Columbia (Henderson) 🔨	2	0	0	1	0	1	0	1	0	1	6

==== Draw 5 ====
Sunday, January 25, 2:30 pm

Sheet D	1	2	3	4	5	6	7	8	9	10	Final
Manitoba (Calvert)	0	1	0	4	0	4	0	2	X	X	11
Ontario (Calwell) 🔨	1	0	1	0	2	0	2	0	X	X	6

Sheet G	1	2	3	4	5	6	7	8	9	10	Final
Nova Scotia (Manuel) 🔨	0	1	0	1	0	2	0	0	1	0	5
British Columbia (Henderson)	1	0	3	0	1	0	1	1	0	1	8

==== Draw 6 ====
Sunday, January 25, 7:00 pm

Sheet H	1	2	3	4	5	6	7	8	9	10	Final
Quebec (Asselin)	3	1	0	2	1	0	1	0	X	X	8
Newfoundland and Labrador (G. Smith) 🔨	0	0	1	0	0	0	0	1	X	X	2

==== Draw 7 ====
Monday, January 26, 10:00 am

Sheet A	1	2	3	4	5	6	7	8	9	10	Final
British Columbia (Henderson) 🔨	0	1	0	2	0	3	1	0	0	1	8
Newfoundland and Labrador (G. Smith)	0	0	1	0	1	0	0	1	3	0	6

Sheet C	1	2	3	4	5	6	7	8	9	10	Final
Nunavut (Komaksiutiksak)	0	1	0	0	1	0	0	0	1	0	3
Manitoba (Calvert) 🔨	4	0	4	0	0	6	3	1	0	3	21

Sheet H	1	2	3	4	5	6	7	8	9	10	Final
Ontario (Calwell)	0	2	0	2	0	3	0	4	X	X	11
Nova Scotia (Manuel) 🔨	1	0	1	0	2	0	2	0	X	X	6

==== Draw 9 ====
Monday, January 26, 7:00 pm

Sheet C	1	2	3	4	5	6	7	8	9	10	Final
Nova Scotia (Manuel)	0	0	0	0	1	0	0	1	X	X	2
Quebec (Asselin) 🔨	0	0	0	2	0	3	1	0	X	X	6

Sheet G	1	2	3	4	5	6	7	8	9	10	Final
Newfoundland and Labrador (G. Smith)	1	0	0	3	0	1	2	1	0	X	8
Nunavut (Komaksiutiksak) 🔨	0	0	1	0	1	0	0	0	1	X	3

==== Draw 10 ====
Tuesday, January 27, 10:00 am

Sheet F	1	2	3	4	5	6	7	8	9	10	Final
Nunavut (Komaksiutiksak)	0	0	0	0	0	0	1	0	X	X	1
Nova Scotia (Manuel) 🔨	2	5	4	3	2	1	0	3	X	X	20

Sheet H	1	2	3	4	5	6	7	8	9	10	Final
Manitoba (Calvert) 🔨	0	0	1	0	3	1	0	2	0	1	8
British Columbia (Henderson)	0	1	0	1	0	0	2	0	1	0	5

==== Draw 11 ====
Tuesday, January 27, 2:30 pm

Sheet B	1	2	3	4	5	6	7	8	9	10	Final
British Columbia (Henderson) 🔨	3	2	2	3	0	5	3	1	X	X	19
Nunavut (Komaksiutiksak)	0	0	0	0	2	0	0	0	X	X	2

Sheet F	1	2	3	4	5	6	7	8	9	10	Final
Manitoba (Calvert)	0	1	1	1	3	0	0	2	0	X	8
Newfoundland and Labrador (G. Smith) 🔨	0	0	0	0	0	1	1	0	1	X	3

Sheet G	1	2	3	4	5	6	7	8	9	10	Final
Ontario (Calwell)	0	0	0	0	1	1	0	2	0	X	4
Quebec (Asselin) 🔨	0	1	1	2	0	0	1	0	2	X	7

==== Pool A Tie-Breaker 1 ====
Tuesday, January 21, 2:30 pm

Sheet A	1	2	3	4	5	6	7	8	9	10	Final
Newfoundland and Labrador (G. Smith) 🔨	2	0	2	0	1	0	0	1	0	1	7
Ontario (Calwell)	0	2	0	2	0	3	1	0	1	0	9

==== Pool A Tie-Breaker 2 ====
Wednesday, January 22, 10:00 am

Sheet F	1	2	3	4	5	6	7	8	9	10	Final
Nova Scotia (Manuel) 🔨	1	0	1	0	1	1	0	0	0	X	4
Ontario (Calwell)	0	1	0	3	0	0	0	0	2	X	6

=== Pool B ===
==== Draw 2 ====
Saturday, January 24, 2:30 pm

Sheet D	1	2	3	4	5	6	7	8	9	10	Final
Saskatchewan (Hersikorn)	0	0	0	1	0	2	0	2	1	0	6
Prince Edward Island (T. Smith) 🔨	0	0	2	0	2	0	0	0	0	1	5

Sheet G	1	2	3	4	5	6	7	8	9	10	Final
Yukon (Wallingham) 🔨	0	0	0	1	0	0	0	2	0	X	3
New Brunswick (Comeau)	0	0	1	0	1	1	0	0	2	X	5

Sheet H	1	2	3	4	5	6	7	8	9	10	Final
Northwest Territories (Miller)	0	1	0	1	0	0	1	1	X	X	4
Alberta (Sturmay) 🔨	5	0	2	0	1	1	0	0	X	X	9

==== Draw 3 ====
Saturday, January 24, 7:30 pm

Sheet A	1	2	3	4	5	6	7	8	9	10	Final
Yukon (Wallingham)	1	0	0	0	3	0	5	0	0	0	9
Prince Edward Island (T. Smith) 🔨	0	1	1	2	0	2	0	4	1	1	12

Sheet C	1	2	3	4	5	6	7	8	9	10	Final
New Brunswick (Comeau)	0	0	0	0	2	0	1	0	1	X	4
Alberta (Sturmay) 🔨	0	0	0	2	0	2	0	2	0	X	6

Sheet F	1	2	3	4	5	6	7	8	9	10	Final
Saskatchewan (Hersikorn)	0	2	0	2	0	1	0	2	1	X	8
Northern Ontario (Horgan) 🔨	2	0	1	0	2	0	1	0	0	X	6

==== Draw 4 ====
Sunday, January 25, 10:00 pm

Sheet G	1	2	3	4	5	6	7	8	9	10	Final
Northern Ontario (Horgan) 🔨	0	4	0	2	0	1	2	0	X	X	9
Northwest Territories (Miller)	0	0	1	0	1	0	0	1	X	X	3

==== Draw 5 ====
Sunday, January 25, 2:30 pm

Sheet F	1	2	3	4	5	6	7	8	9	10	Final
Prince Edward Island (T. Smith)	0	1	0	0	1	1	0	1	0	X	4
New Brunswick (Comeau) 🔨	2	0	2	0	0	0	2	0	4	X	10

Sheet H	1	2	3	4	5	6	7	8	9	10	Final
Saskatchewan (Hersikorn) 🔨	1	1	0	0	1	0	0	0	3	X	6
Yukon (Wallingham)	0	0	1	0	0	1	0	0	0	X	2

==== Draw 6 ====
Sunday, January 25, 7:00 pm

Sheet A	1	2	3	4	5	6	7	8	9	10	Final
Alberta (Sturmay) 🔨	0	1	0	0	0	1	0	1	0	X	3
Northern Ontario (Horgan)	0	0	1	0	0	0	0	0	0	X	1

Sheet B	1	2	3	4	5	6	7	8	9	10	Final
Yukon (Wallingham)	0	1	0	4	1	0	0	1	1	0	8
Northwest Territories (Miller) 🔨	0	0	1	0	0	1	2	0	0	1	5

Sheet E	1	2	3	4	5	6	7	8	9	10	Final
New Brunswick (Comeau) 🔨	1	0	2	1	0	2	0	1	2	X	9
Saskatchewan (Hersikorn)	0	2	0	0	0	0	3	0	0	X	5

==== Draw 7 ====
Monday, January 26, 10:00 am

Sheet A	1	2	3	4	5	6	7	8	9	10	Final
Prince Edward Island (T. Smith)	0	0	0	0	0	0	0	1	1	X	2
Alberta (Sturmay) 🔨	0	2	0	1	1	0	0	0	0	X	4

==== Draw 8 ====
Monday, January 26, 2:30 pm

Sheet A	1	2	3	4	5	6	7	8	9	10	Final
Northwest Territories (Miller)	0	2	0	0	1	0	3	0	X	X	6
Saskatchewan (Hersikorn) 🔨	2	0	4	3	0	2	0	2	X	X	13

Sheet D	1	2	3	4	5	6	7	8	9	10	Final
Northern Ontario (Horgan)	0	0	0	2	0	2	1	0	0	0	5
Yukon (Wallingham) 🔨	0	2	0	0	2	0	0	0	1	1	6

==== Draw 9 ====
Monday, January 26, 7:00 pm

Sheet E	1	2	3	4	5	6	7	8	9	10	Final
Northwest Territories (Miller) 🔨	0	2	1	0	1	0	0	1	0	X	5
New Brunswick (Comeau)	2	0	0	2	0	2	1	0	3	X	10

Sheet F	1	2	3	4	5	6	7	8	9	10	Final
Alberta (Sturmay) 🔨	2	0	1	2	1	1	0	1	X	X	8
Yukon (Wallingham)	0	1	0	0	0	0	1	0	X	X	2

==== Draw 10 ====
Tuesday, January 27, 10:00 am

Sheet C	1	2	3	4	5	6	7	8	9	10	Final
Prince Edward Island (T. Smith)	0	4	1	0	0	2	5	1	X	X	13
Northwest Territories (Miller) 🔨	1	0	0	1	0	0	0	0	X	X	2

Sheet D	1	2	3	4	5	6	7	8	9	10	Final
New Brunswick (Comeau)	0	1	1	0	0	3	0	1	0	1	7
Northern Ontario (Horgan) 🔨	0	0	0	2	0	0	2	0	2	0	6

Sheet G	1	2	3	4	5	6	7	8	9	10	Final
Alberta (Sturmay) 🔨	0	2	0	2	0	0	0	0	1	0	5
Saskatchewan (Hersikorn)	0	0	2	0	1	1	0	0	0	3	7

==== Draw 11 ====
Tuesday, January 21, 2:30 pm

Sheet E	1	2	3	4	5	6	7	8	9	10	Final
Northern Ontario (Horgan) 🔨	0	0	0	0	2	1	3	1	X	X	7
Prince Edward Island (T. Smith)	0	0	0	0	0	0	0	0	X	X	0

==== Pool B Tie-Breaker 1 ====
Tuesday, January 21, 7:00 pm

Sheet B	1	2	3	4	5	6	7	8	9	10	Final
Prince Edward Island (T. Smith)	1	0	0	3	0	0	1	0	0	1	6
Yukon (Wallingham) 🔨	0	1	3	0	0	1	0	0	0	0	5

==== Pool B Tie-Breaker 2 ====
Wednesday, January 22, 10:00 am

Sheet G	1	2	3	4	5	6	7	8	9	10	11	Final
Northern Ontario (Horgan)	1	0	0	0	0	3	0	1	0	0	4	9
Prince Edward Island (T.Smith) 🔨	0	1	0	1	0	0	2	0	0	1	0	5

== Placement Round ==
=== Seeding Pool ===
==== Standings ====
Final round-robin standings

Province	Skip	W	L
Prince Edward Island	Tyler Smith	5	4
Nova Scotia	Matthew Manuel	4	5
Newfoundland and Labrador	Greg Smith	3	6
Yukon	Joe Wallingham	3	6
Northwest Territories	Matthew Miller	2	7
Nunavut	Kane Komaksiutiksak	0	9

===== Draw 1 =====
Wednesday, January 28, 2:30 pm

Sheet A	1	2	3	4	5	6	7	8	9	10	Final
Prince Edward Island (T. Smith) 🔨	0	0	0	2	1	0	0	2	2	X	7
Nova Scotia (Manuel)	0	0	1	0	0	1	1	0	0	X	3

Sheet C	1	2	3	4	5	6	7	8	9	10	Final
Northwest Territories (Miller)	0	2	1	2	1	2	1	2	X	X	11
Nunavut (Komaksiutiksak) 🔨	2	0	0	0	0	0	0	0	X	X	2

Sheet E	1	2	3	4	5	6	7	8	9	10	11	Final
Yukon (Wallingham)	0	2	1	0	2	0	2	0	0	1	0	8
Newfoundland and Labrador (G. Smith) 🔨	4	0	0	1	0	1	0	1	1	0	1	9

===== Draw 2 =====
Wednesday, January 28, 7:00 pm

Sheet G	1	2	3	4	5	6	7	8	9	10	11	Final
Nova Scotia (Manuel)	0	0	2	0	1	0	1	0	2	0	2	8
Yukon (Wallingham) 🔨	1	0	0	1	0	2	0	1	0	1	0	6

===== Draw 3 =====
Thursday, January 29, 2:30 pm

Sheet F	1	2	3	4	5	6	7	8	9	10	Final
Nunavut (Komaksiutiksak)	0	1	0	1	0	0	0	1	X	X	3
Yukon (Wallingham) 🔨	1	0	4	0	1	0	1	0	X	X	7

Sheet G	1	2	3	4	5	6	7	8	9	10	11	Final
Newfoundland and Labrador (G. Smith) 🔨	0	2	1	0	1	0	1	0	3	0	0	8
Northwest Territories (Miller)	1	0	0	2	0	1	0	1	0	3	1	9

===== Draw 4 =====
Thursday, January 29, 7:00 pm

Sheet F	1	2	3	4	5	6	7	8	9	10	Final
Newfoundland and Labrador (G. Smith)	1	0	0	3	0	0	0	1	0	X	5
Prince Edward Island (T. Smith) 🔨	0	2	1	0	4	1	1	0	1	X	10

===== Draw 5 =====
Friday, January 30, 12:30 pm

Sheet D	1	2	3	4	5	6	7	8	9	10	Final
Nova Scotia (Manuel) 🔨	2	2	0	2	0	2	1	0	X	X	9
Northwest Territories (Miller)	0	0	1	0	1	0	0	1	X	X	3

Sheet E	1	2	3	4	5	6	7	8	9	10	Final
Nunavut (Komaksiutiksak)	0	1	0	0	1	0	0	1	X	X	3
Prince Edward Island (T. Smith) 🔨	4	0	3	3	0	2	2	0	X	X	14

=== Championship Pool ===
==== Championship Pool Standings ====
Final round-robin standings

Key
Teams to Playoffs
Teams to Tie-Breaker

Province	Skip	W	L
Manitoba	Braden Calvert	9	1
New Brunswick	Rene Comeau	8	2
Saskatchewan	Jacob Hersikorn	7	3
Quebec	Félix Asselin	7	3
Alberta	Karsten Sturmay	7	3
Northern Ontario	Tanner Horgan	5	5
British Columbia	Paul Henderson	5	5
Ontario	Mac Calwell	2	8

=== Draw 1 ===
Wednesday, January 28, 10:00 am

Sheet A	1	2	3	4	5	6	7	8	9	10	Final
Quebec (Asselin) 🔨	1	2	0	0	2	1	0	0	0	0	6
New Brunswick (Comeau)	0	0	1	1	0	0	2	0	1	3	8

Sheet E	1	2	3	4	5	6	7	8	9	10	Final
Saskatchewan (Hersikorn) 🔨	1	0	0	0	1	0	1	0	0	X	3
Manitoba (Calvert)	0	2	1	0	0	1	0	0	2	X	6

=== Draw 2 ===
Wednesday, January 28, 2:30 pm

Sheet G	1	2	3	4	5	6	7	8	9	10	Final
Saskatchewan (Hersikorn) 🔨	1	0	0	1	0	1	0	0	X	X	3
British Columbia (Henderson)	0	0	3	0	2	0	2	2	X	X	9

=== Draw 3 ===
Wednesday, January 28, 7:00 pm

Sheet A	1	2	3	4	5	6	7	8	9	10	Final
Northern Ontario (Horgan)	2	0	3	0	1	0	2	2	X	X	10
Ontario (Calwell) 🔨	0	2	0	1	0	1	0	0	X	X	4

Sheet B	1	2	3	4	5	6	7	8	9	10	Final
British Columbia (Henderson) 🔨	0	1	0	1	1	0	0	0	0	X	3
Alberta (Sturmay)	0	0	2	0	0	1	1	2	2	X	8

Sheet C	1	2	3	4	5	6	7	8	9	10	Final
Manitoba (Calvert) 🔨	1	0	0	0	0	2	1	0	0	2	6
New Brunswick (Comeau)	0	0	0	2	1	0	0	1	0	0	4

=== Draw 4 ===
Thursday, January 29, 10:00 am

Sheet B	1	2	3	4	5	6	7	8	9	10	Final
Quebec (Asselin) 🔨	0	1	0	2	0	2	0	0	X	X	5
Saskatchewan (Hersikorn)	0	0	4	0	2	0	6	0	X	X	12

Sheet D	1	2	3	4	5	6	7	8	9	10	Final
Ontario (Calwell)	0	0	0	0	0	1	0	1	0	X	2
Alberta (Sturmay) 🔨	0	1	2	2	1	0	0	0	2	X	8

=== Draw 5 ===
Thursday, January 29, 2:30 pm

Sheet C	1	2	3	4	5	6	7	8	9	10	Final
Alberta (Sturmay)	0	0	0	0	0	0	0	0	0	X	0
Quebec (Asselin) 🔨	0	0	0	0	0	0	0	1	1	X	2

Sheet D	1	2	3	4	5	6	7	8	9	10	Final
British Columbia (Henderson)	0	0	1	0	0	1	0	0	X	X	2
Northern Ontario (Horgan) 🔨	0	2	0	1	2	0	2	1	X	X	8

Sheet E	1	2	3	4	5	6	7	8	9	10	Final
New Brunswick (Comeau) 🔨	0	1	0	1	0	2	0	1	0	1	6
Ontario (Calwell)	1	0	1	0	1	0	1	0	1	0	5

=== Draw 6 ===
Thursday, January 29, 7:00 pm

Sheet A	1	2	3	4	5	6	7	8	9	10	Final
New Brunswick (Comeau) 🔨	1	0	2	0	1	0	2	1	0	0	7
British Columbia (Henderson)	0	1	0	2	0	0	0	0	2	0	5

Sheet B	1	2	3	4	5	6	7	8	9	10	Final
Manitoba (Calvert) 🔨	0	1	0	2	0	0	0	2	0	0	5
Northern Ontario (Horgan)	0	0	1	0	0	0	1	0	1	1	4

=== Draw 7 ===
Friday, January 30, 8:30 am

Sheet A	1	2	3	4	5	6	7	8	9	10	Final
Manitoba (Calvert) 🔨	1	0	0	1	1	0	2	0	2	X	7
Alberta (Sturmay)	0	0	0	0	0	1	0	2	0	X	3

Sheet C	1	2	3	4	5	6	7	8	9	10	Final
Ontario (Calwell) 🔨	0	1	0	1	0	2	0	0	X	X	4
Saskatchewan (Hersikorn)	0	0	3	0	2	0	4	3	X	X	12

Sheet E	1	2	3	4	5	6	7	8	9	10	Final
Northern Ontario (Horgan) 🔨	0	0	1	0	1	0	0	3	0	1	6
Quebec (Asselin)	0	0	0	1	0	1	0	0	2	0	4

=== Tie-Breaker 1 ===
Friday, January 30, 1:30 pm

Sheet A	1	2	3	4	5	6	7	8	9	10	Final
Quebec (Asselin) 🔨	0	0	0	1	0	0	2	0	1	1	5
Alberta (Sturmay)	0	0	0	0	0	2	0	1	0	0	3

=== Tie-Breaker 2 ===
Saturday, January 31, 1:30 pm

Sheet A	1	2	3	4	5	6	7	8	9	10	Final
Saskatchewan (Hersikorn) 🔨	2	0	0	2	1	0	1	0	0	2	8
Quebec (Asselin)	0	1	1	0	0	2	0	1	2	0	7

=== Playoffs ===
Semifinal			Final
			1	Manitoba	8
2	New Brunswick	6	3	Saskatchewan	6
3	Saskatchewan	8

==== Semifinal ====
Sunday, February 1, 1:30 pm

Team	1	2	3	4	5	6	7	8	9	10	Final
New Brunswick (Comeau) 🔨	1	0	1	0	1	1	0	0	2	0	6
Saskatchewan (Hersikorn)	0	2	0	2	0	0	1	1	0	2	8

==== Final ====
Sunday, February 1, 8:00 pm

Team	1	2	3	4	5	6	7	8	9	10	Final
Manitoba (Calvert) 🔨	1	1	0	1	0	2	0	1	0	2	8
Saskatchewan (Hersikorn)	0	0	1	0	1	0	2	0	2	0	6
