= Central West Senior Hockey League =

Ice hockey league in Newfoundland and Labrador, Canada

- Region: Newfoundland
- Founded: 2014
- No. of teams: 4
- Associated titles: Herder Memorial Trophy (Provincial); Allan Cup (National)
- Recent champions: Grand Falls-Windsor Cataracts
- Website: cwshlnews.com

The Central West Senior Hockey League (CWSHL) is a senior ice hockey league in Newfoundland and Labrador, Canada. The league competed for the Herder Memorial Trophy and its teams declared themselves eligible for the Allan Cup.

== History ==
On June 4, 2014 four teams from the Newfoundland Senior Hockey League, the Clarenville Caribous, Western Royals, Gander Flyers and the Grand Falls-Windsor Cataracts, officially announced their departure and formed a new league to be the Central West Senior Hockey League (CWSHL).

On February 25, 2015, Hockey Newfoundland and Labrador approved a request by the Central West Senior Hockey League in which they asked to play for the historic Herder Trophy because it was the only operating Senior A hockey league registered in the province.

Hockey NL announced on September 20, 2015 that beginning in March 2016 the CWSHL champions will play the Avalon East Senior Hockey League champions in a best-of-five Herder final series.

After a hiatus of over 6 seasons, the CWSHL restarted and the newly formed league consisted of four teams for the 2023-2024 season.

== Teams ==
| Team | Centre | Arena |
|---|---|---|
| Deer Lake Red Wings | Deer Lake | Hodder Memorial Centre |
| Corner Brook Royals | Corner Brook | Corner Brook Civic Centre |
| Stephenville Lightning | Stephenville | Stephenville Dome |
| Grand Falls-Windsor Cataracts | Grand Falls-Windsor | Joe Byrne Memorial Stadium |

== Champions ==
- 2015 Grand Falls-Windsor Cataracts

== League trophies and awards ==
=== First Place in Regular Season ===
| Season | Winner | Record |
|---|---|---|
| 2014-2015 | Corner Brook Royals | |
| 2015-2016 | Grand Falls-Windsor Cataracts | |

=== Top Scorer in Regular Season ===
| Season | Winner | Points | Team |
|---|---|---|---|
| 2014-2015 | | | |
| 2015-2016 | Cam Fergus | | Grand Falls-Windsor Cataracts |

=== Top Goaltender Award ===
| Season | Winner | Team |
|---|---|---|
| 2014-2015 | | |
| 2015-2016 | | |

== Herder Champions ==
- 2015 Grand Falls-Windsor Cataracts
