= Nick Mickoski =

Canadian ice hockey player

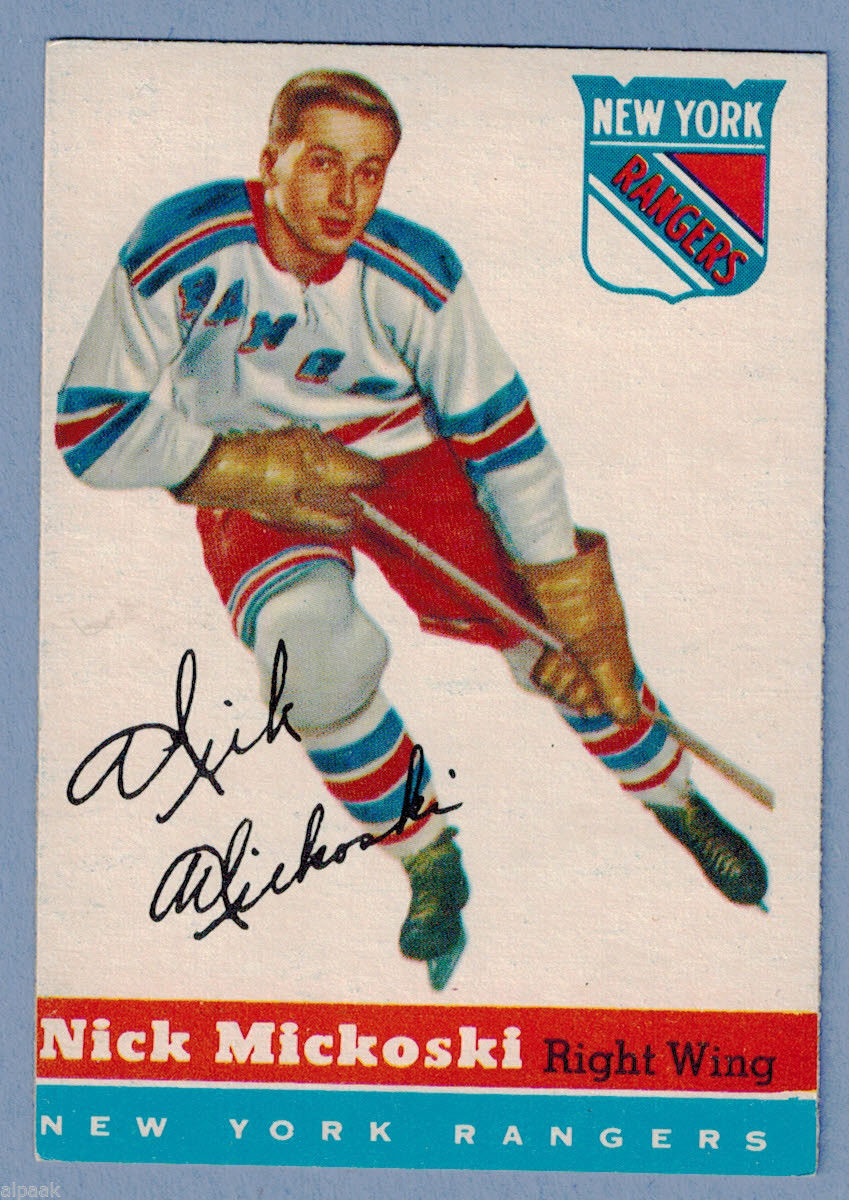
- Born: December 7, 1927 Winnipeg, Manitoba, Canada
- Died: March 13, 2002 (aged 74) Winnipeg, Manitoba, Canada
- Height: 6 ft 1 in (185 cm)
- Weight: 193 lb (88 kg; 13 st 11 lb)
- Position: Right wing
- Played for: New York Rangers; Chicago Black Hawks; Detroit Red Wings; Boston Bruins
- Playing career: 1945–1965

Nicholas Mickoski (December 7, 1927 – March 13, 2002) was a Canadian ice hockey forward. He played in the National Hockey League with four teams between 1948 and 1960. The rest of his career, which lasted from 1945 to 1965, was spent in various minor leagues. He was born in Winnipeg, Manitoba.

== Playing career ==
Mickoski started his National Hockey League career with the New York Rangers in 1947. He would also play for the Chicago Black Hawks, Detroit Red Wings, and Boston Bruins. He retired after the 1960 season. After retiring in 1960, Nick went on to play in the WHL and coached the Grand Falls Cataracts in the NAHA senior hockey league in the Canadian province of Newfoundland and Labrador beginning in 1967.

== Career statistics ==
=== Regular season and playoffs ===
			Regular season					Playoffs
Season	Team	League	GP	G	A	Pts	PIM	GP	G	A	Pts	PIM
1943–44	St. Catharines Falcons	OHA	26	4	6	10	50	6	0	0	0	17
1944–45	Canadian Ukrainian AC	MJHL	12	11	4	15	2	4	5	4	9	0
1945–46	St. James Orioles	MJHL	10	10	6	16	8	2	0	0	0	0
1945–46	New York Rovers	EAHL	25	6	8	14	8	9	1	2	3	6
1946–47	New York Rovers	QSHL	30	25	16	41	16	—	—	—	—	—
1946–47	New York Rovers	EAHL	10	9	16	25	10	—	—	—	—	—
1947–48	New Haven Ramblers	AHL	22	11	16	27	4	4	2	1	3	2
1947–48	New York Rangers	NHL	—	—	—	—	—	2	0	1	1	0
1948–49	New York Rangers	NHL	54	13	9	22	20	—	—	—	—	—
1949–50	New York Rangers	NHL	45	10	10	20	10	12	1	5	6	2
1949–50	New Haven Ramblers	AHL	23	12	17	29	7	—	—	—	—	—
1950–51	New York Rangers	NHL	64	20	15	35	12	—	—	—	—	—
1951–52	New York Rangers	NHL	43	7	13	20	20	—	—	—	—	—
1951–52	Cincinnati Mohawks	AHL	22	11	10	21	15	5	2	3	5	4
1952–53	New York Rangers	NHL	70	19	16	35	39	—	—	—	—	—
1953–54	New York Rangers	NHL	68	19	16	35	22	—	—	—	—	—
1954–55	New York Rangers	NHL	18	0	14	14	6	—	—	—	—	—
1954–55	Chicago Black Hawks	NHL	52	10	19	29	42	—	—	—	—	—
1955–56	Chicago Black Hawks	NHL	70	19	20	39	52	—	—	—	—	—
1956–57	Chicago Black Hawks	NHL	70	16	20	36	24	—	—	—	—	—
1957–58	Chicago Black Hawks	NHL	28	5	6	11	20	—	—	—	—	—
1957–58	Detroit Red Wings	NHL	37	8	12	20	30	4	0	0	0	4
1958–59	Detroit Red Wings	NHL	66	11	15	26	20	—	—	—	—	—
1959–60	Boston Bruins	NHL	18	1	0	1	2	—	—	—	—	—
1959–60	Providence Reds	AHL	48	29	22	51	6	5	2	5	7	4
1960–61	Winnipeg Warriors	WHL	69	25	24	49	16	—	—	—	—	—
1961–62	San Francisco Seals	WHL	70	31	48	79	24	2	1	1	2	0
1962–63	San Francisco Seals	WHL	68	41	54	95	20	17	5	11	16	6
1963–64	San Francisco Seals	WHL	68	20	37	57	28	11	2	10	12	4
1964–65	San Francisco Seals	WHL	60	13	33	46	24	—	—	—	—	—
1966–67	Grand Falls-Windsor Cataracts	NFLD Sr	37	27	49	76	12	—	—	—	—	—
1967–68	Grand Falls-Windsor Cataracts	NFLD Sr	40	34	56	90	14	5	1	6	7	0
1968–69	Grand Falls-Windsor Cataracts	NFLD Sr	40	24	28	52	26	6	2	4	6	4
NHL totals			703	158	185	343	319	18	1	6	7	6

== Awards and achievements ==
- Played in NHL All-Star Game (1956)
- WHL First All-Star Team (1963)
- WHL Championship (1963)
- Inducted into the Manitoba Sports Hall of Fame and Museum in 2004
- Honoured Member of the Manitoba Hockey Hall of Fame
- In the 2009 book 100 Ranger Greats, was ranked No. 77 all-time of the 901 New York Rangers who had played during the team's first 82 seasons
