= 1985 Allan Cup =

Canadian senior ice hockey championship

The Allan Cup trophy

The 1985 Allan Cup was the Canadian senior ice hockey championship for the 1984–85 senior "AAA" season. The event was hosted by the Corner Brook Royals in Corner Brook, Newfoundland and Labrador. The 1985 playoff marked the 77th time that the Allan Cup has been awarded.

The 1985 Allan Cup is the first instance and possibly the last in which the winner overcame a 3-games-to-none deficit to win the entire series.

== Teams ==
- Corner Brook Royals (Eastern Canadian Champions)
- Thunder Bay Twins (Western Canadian Champions)

== Best-of-Seven Series ==
Corner Brook Royals 9 - Thunder Bay Twins 5
Corner Brook Royals 3 - Thunder Bay Twins 2 (OT)
Corner Brook Royals 9 - Thunder Bay Twins 5
Thunder Bay Twins 4 - Corner Brook Royals 2
Thunder Bay Twins 8 - Corner Brook Royals 3
Thunder Bay Twins 2 - Corner Brook Royals 0
Thunder Bay Twins 5 - Corner Brook Royals 4
