= 1986 Allan Cup =

Canadian senior ice hockey championship

The Allan Cup trophy

The 1986 Allan Cup was the Canadian senior ice hockey championship for the 1985–86 senior "AAA" season. The event was hosted by the Nelson Maple Leafs in Nelson, British Columbia. The 1986 playoff marked the 78th time that the Allan Cup has been awarded.

== Teams ==
- Corner Brook Royals (Eastern Canadian Champions)
- Nelson Maple Leafs (Western Canadian Champions)

== Best-of-Seven Series ==
Corner Brook Royals 6 - Nelson Maple Leafs 4
Corner Brook Royals 6 - Nelson Maple Leafs 5
Corner Brook Royals 5 - Nelson Maple Leafs 2

28 April 1986:Corner Brook Royals 7 - Nelson Maple Leafs 0
