= 1968 Allan Cup =

Canadian senior ice hockey championship

The Allan Cup trophy

The 1968 Allan Cup was the Canadian senior ice hockey championship for the 1967–68 senior "A" season. The event was hosted by the St. Boniface Mohawks and Winnipeg, Manitoba. The 1968 playoff marked the 60th time that the Allan Cup has been awarded.

== Teams ==
- Victoriaville Tigres (Eastern Canadian Champions)
- St. Boniface Mohawks (Western Canadian Champions)

== Playdowns ==
=== Allan Cup Best-of-Seven Series ===
Victoriaville Tigres 6 - St. Boniface Mohawks 2
St. Boniface Mohawks 5 - Victoriaville Tigres 1
Victoriaville Tigres 4 - St. Boniface Mohawks 1
Victoriaville Tigres 7 - St. Boniface Mohawks 2
Victoriaville Tigres 2 - St. Boniface Mohawks 0

=== Eastern Playdowns ===
Quarter-final

Corner Brook Royals defeated Morrisburg Combines 3-games-to-1

Morrisburg Combines 7 - Corner Brook Royals 4
Corner Brook Royals 6 - Morrisburg Combines 4
Corner Brook Royals 4 - Morrisburg Combines 1
Corner Brook Royals 10 - Morrisburg Combines 0

Semi-final

Victoriaville Tigres defeated Corner Brook Royals 3-games-to-1

Victoriaville Tigres 15 - Corner Brook Royals 1
Victoriaville Tigres 9 - Corner Brook Royals 2
Corner Brook Royals 6 - Victoriaville Tigres 1
Victoriaville Tigres 3 - Corner Brook Royals 0

Final

Victoriaville Tigres defeated Toronto Marlboros 4-games-to-none

Victoriaville Tigres 5 - Toronto Marlboros 1
Victoriaville Tigres 6 - Toronto Marlboros 2
Victoriaville Tigres 4 - Toronto Marlboros 1
Victoriaville Tigres 6 - Toronto Marlboros 4

=== Western Playdowns ===
Quarter-final

Drumheller Miners defeated Spokane Jets 3-games-to-1

Drumheller Miners 7 - Spokane Jets 4
Drumheller Miners 2 - Spokane Jets 1
Spokane Jets3 - Drumheller Miners 0
Drumheller Miners 3 - Spokane Jets 2

Pacific Semi-final

Drumheller Miners defeated Saskatoon Quakers 3-games-to-1

Saskatoon Quakers 3 - Drumheller Miners 2
Drumheller Miners 2 - Saskatoon Quakers 1
Drumheller Miners 5 - Saskatoon Quakers 4
Drumheller Miners 5 - Saskatoon Quakers 4

West Semi-final

St. Boniface Mohawks defeated Port Arthur Bearcats 3-games-to-1

St. Boniface Mohawks 6 - Port Arthur Bearcats 3
St. Boniface Mohawks 7 - Port Arthur Bearcats 4
Port Arthur Bearcats 6 - St. Boniface Mohawks 3
St. Boniface Mohawks 5 - Port Arthur Bearcats 4

Final

St. Boniface Mohawks defeated Drumheller Miners 3-games-to-none

St. Boniface Mohawks 4 - Drumheller Miners 3
St. Boniface Mohawks 4 - Drumheller Miners 2
St. Boniface Mohawks 6 - Drumheller Miners 0
