= Joe Byrne Memorial Stadium =

Canadian multi-purpose arena

Coordinates: 48.928197°N 55.657983°W

- The Joe
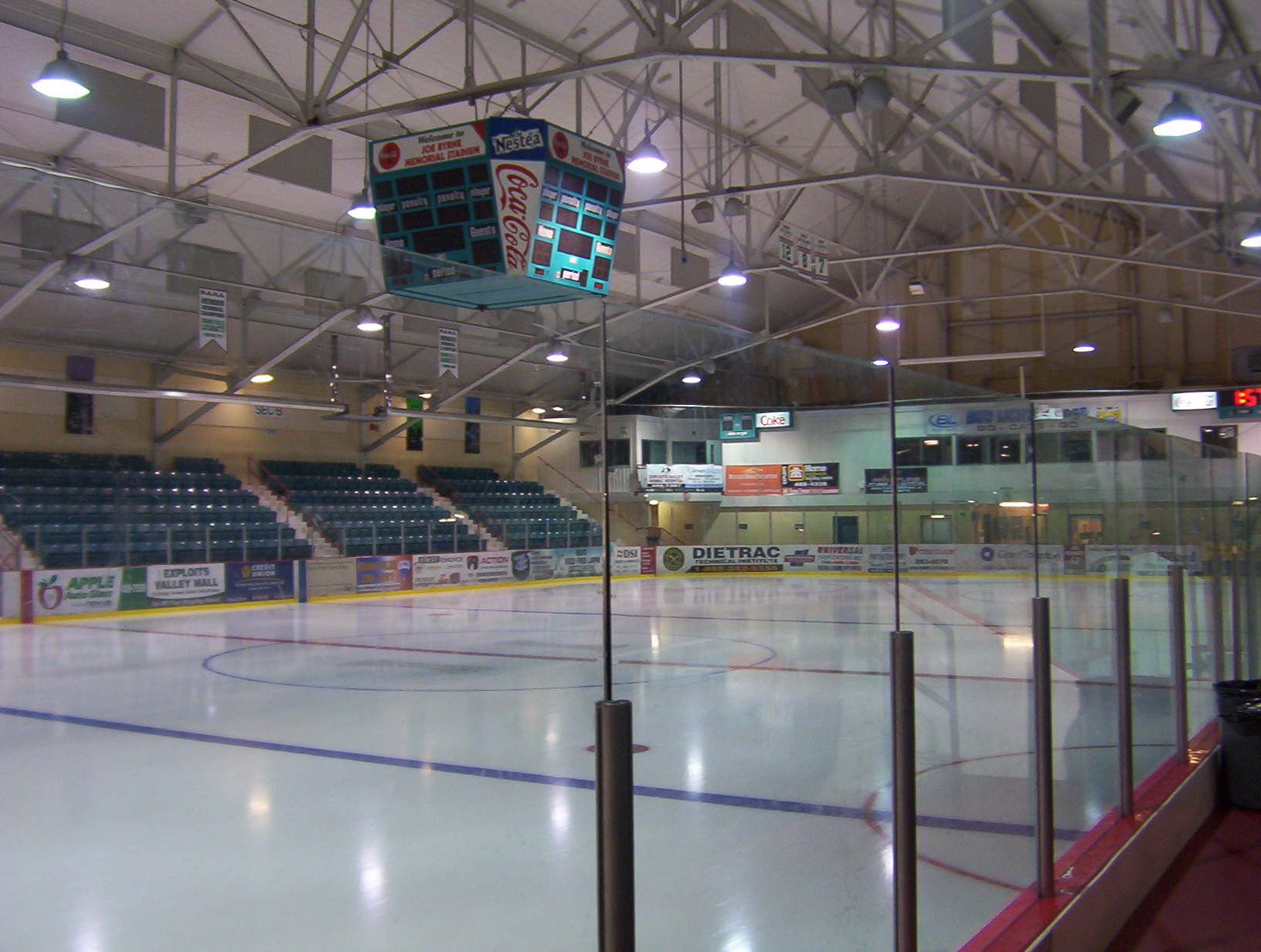
- The Joe Byrne Memorial Stadium in 2011
- Interactive map of Joe Byrne Memorial Stadium
- Former names: Grand Falls Stadium (until March 1991)
- Location: Jones Street, Grand Falls-Windsor, Newfoundland and Labrador, Canada
- Owner: Town of Grand Falls-Windsor
- Capacity: Ice hockey: 947 (1250 incl. general adm.)

Construction
- Opened: February 12, 1948
- Expanded: 2003/04

Tenant
- Grand Falls-Windsor Cataracts (CWSHL)

Website
- Joe Byrne Mem. Stadium

Joe Byrne Memorial Stadium, colloquially known as "The Joe", is a multi-purpose arena located on Jones Street, adjacent to High Street, in Grand Falls-Windsor, Newfoundland and Labrador. The stadium is used to host trade shows, conferences, sporting events and special events. The ice arena was constructed in 1947/48 and was known as the Grand Falls Stadium until 1991.

== Construction ==
The Anglo-Newfoundland Development Company built and owned the Grand Falls Stadium. The town of Grand Falls was incorporated in 1961 and that year bought the stadium from the company.

== Opening ==
The first performance at the new stadium was a children's ice carnival followed by a figure skating exhibition by two Murphy sisters from Corner Brook on February 12, 1948. Approximately 2,300 spectators attended the stadium's first event. The official opening of the stadium was on November 22, 1948. An exhibition game was played between two teams from the Maritime Senior Hockey League, the Halifax Crescents and the Halifax St. Mary's.

When the stadium first opened, and until late 1954 when St. John's Memorial Stadium was completed, it was the only regulation-size artificial ice surface in Newfoundland and could accommodate 2,500 spectators.

== Stadium Managers ==
- Edgar M. "Top" Way
- William J. (Bill) Short, 1959
- James Pond, Sr., 1959-?
- Harv Beson

== Memorial to Joseph Byrne ==
On March 22, 1991 the stadium was renamed as a memorial to Joe Byrne, on what would have been his 70th birthday, in recognition of his lifelong contribution to sports in the community and the province. Byrne, a Quebec City native, was hired by the Grand Falls Athletic Association to coach their hockey team and moved to the papertown in December 1949. He died in August 1990 at Grand Falls.
