= Corner Brook Civic Centre =

Arena in Corner Brook, Canada

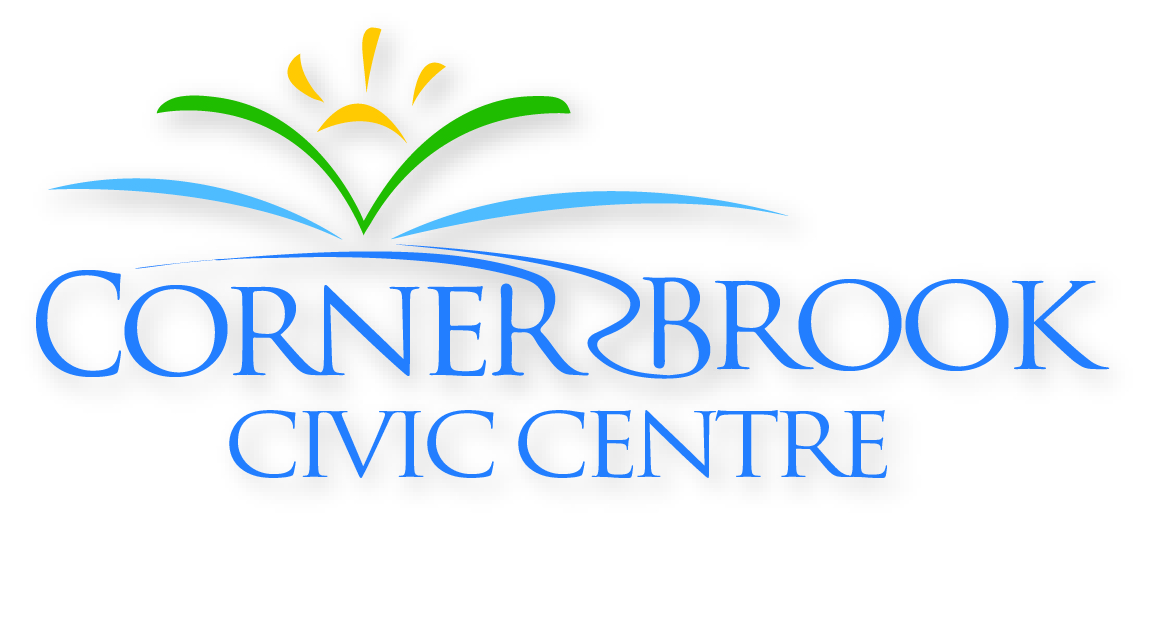
- Interactive map of Corner Brook Civic Centre
- Former names: Canada Games Centre, Pepsi Centre
- Address: 1 Canada Games Place
- Location: Corner Brook, Newfoundland and Labrador, Canada
- Coordinates: 48°56′22.56″N 57°56′22.96″W
- Owner: City of Corner Brook
- Operator: City of Corner Brook
- Capacity: 3100

Construction
- Opened: 1997

The Corner Brook Civic Centre (previously named the Canada Games Centre and the Pepsi Centre) is a 3,100-seat multi-purpose arena in Corner Brook, Newfoundland and Labrador, Canada. It was home to the ice hockey, figure skating, judo, and squash events of the 1999 Canada Winter Games. Previously run by Memorial University through Western Sports and Entertainment, it is currently owned and operated by the City of Corner Brook. The Civic Centre is the home arena of the Corner Brook Royals. The facility also includes the Kinsmen Arena II, a second, smaller arena to host small-scale ice events, and the Civic Centre Studio (Formerly Pepsi Studio), capable of hosting large-scale conferences and sporting events.

The Civic Centre is home to the Corner Brook Minor Hockey League; it also hosts other youth and adult sporting events and gatherings.

On September 11, 2005, the Civic Centre played host to an exhibition game of the then newly formed St. John's Fog Devils of the QMJHL versus the Ottawa 67's of the OHL. The arena played host to an AHL exhibition game between the St. John's IceCaps and the Syracuse Crunch on October 4, 2012, in Game 1 of the Mary Brown's Cup three-game series, coinciding with the IceCaps' training camp for the 2012-13 AHL season.
