= Grand Falls-Windsor Cataracts =

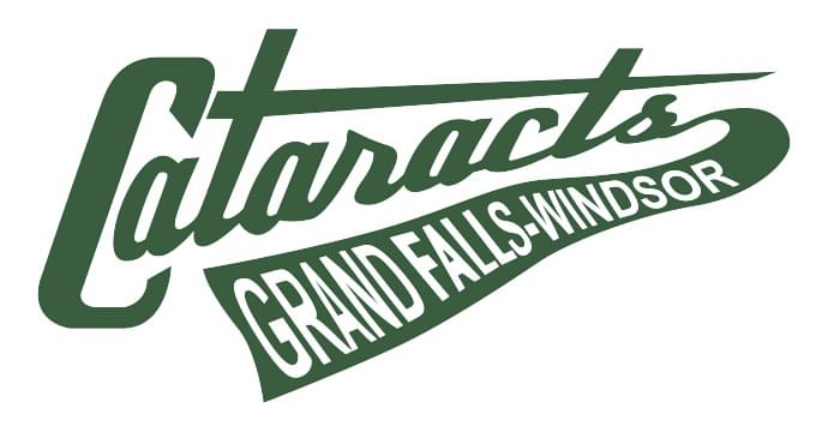
- City: Grand Falls-Windsor, NL
- League: Central West Senior Hockey League
- Founded: 1966
- Home arena: Joe Byrne Memorial Stadium
- Colours: Green, white, red
- Head coach: Cody White
- Captain: Cody Drover

Franchise history
- 1928–48: Grand Falls
- 1948–55: Grand Falls All-Stars
- 1956–65: Grand Falls Andcos
- 1966–85: Grand Falls Cataracts
- 1992–present: Grand Falls-Windsor Cataracts

The Grand Falls-Windsor Cataracts are a senior ice hockey team based in Grand Falls-Windsor, Newfoundland and Labrador and a member of the Central West Senior Hockey League.

Since it was formed in 1966, the Cataracts hockey club has been awarded the Herder Memorial Trophy eight times as all-Newfoundland senior hockey champions, including three consecutive championships from 2014 to 2016, and were awarded the Evening Telegram Trophy on six occasions for finishing first overall in the NSHL regular season. The Cataracts won the senior ice hockey championship of Canada in 2017, winning the club's first Allan Cup.

The Cataracts play their home games at the Joe Byrne Memorial Stadium, formerly known as the Grand Falls Stadium until March 22, 1991.

== History ==
Plans to form a new Grand Falls senior hockey team to re-enter the Newfoundland Senior Hockey League (NSHL) started at the conclusion of the Central Hockey League's 1965-66 season. A group of ex-Andcos and league executive members, together with a group of volunteers that later formed the Cataracts Booster Club, raised the necessary funds to start a new senior team and pay off the debts remaining of the Andcos hockey club. The Andcos was the previous papertown entry that folded at the end of the 1964–65 season. The start-up group included former Andcos Leo Murphy, Walt Davis, Al Dwyer Jr. and Jim Temple, who all would play many games with the new club.

In July & August 1966 the Central Hockey League sponsored an island-wide contest to pick a new team name. The name Cataracts was selected by a Central Hockey League Committee from a list of popular entries.

The Cataracts joined the NSHL for the 1966–67 season as the sixth team. The Grand Falls Recreation Commission hired Winnipeg native and twelve-year NHL veteran Nick Mickoski as the coach for the town's senior and junior hockey programs. Mickoski would be the Cataracts' first head coach. At the end of the 1967-68 regular season, after their second year, the Cataracts finished in first place and were awarded the Evening Telegram Trophy. Mickoski coached the Cataracts for the club's first three seasons before returning to Winnipeg in 1969.

In September 1970 the Cataracts hired 33-year old Jean-Guy Morissette. The Causapscal, Quebec native, who played in one NHL game with the Montreal Canadiens in 1963, was then ranked by many as the top amateur goalie in Canada. Morissette backstopped the Cataracts for two seasons, playing in 68 of 72 regular season games, and was the league's top goaltender in 1972. Jean-Guy helped the Cataracts win their first Herders in 1971 and 1972.

Joe Byrne coached the Cataracts to back-to-back all-Newfoundland senior hockey championship titles in 1981 and 1982. In 1983 the Cats were looking for a three-peat but lost in the finals to the Stephenville Jets in the seventh and deciding game.

The Cataracts did not join the Newfoundland Senior Hockey league in 1983–84 due to significant debts at the conclusion of the previous season. The Grand Falls Sportstop Cataracts joined the Central Beothuck Intermediate Senior Hockey League for the 1983-84 season, winning the league championship in a seven-game final series.

The Cataracts re-joined the NSHL for the 1984–85 season to make it a four-team league. The league permitted teams to hire seven paid "imports" including a goaltender and up to six skaters. This created a very competitive league but the Cataracts once again ended the season with a significant deficit, leading to the decision to drop out of the league the following season. The Cataracts would not have a team in a local or provincial league for the next seven seasons.

In 1992 a six-member committee was formed, spearheaded by Mike Browne, to raise money and bring back the Cataracts to senior hockey. In the fall of 1992 the Cataracts entered the Central Beothuck Senior Hockey League to make it a six-team league. The CBSHL had no import players but financial problems were still present in the league.

From 2011 through 2014 the Cataracts were part of the re-formed Newfoundland Senior Hockey League. Following a first-place league finish at the end of the 2010–2011 season, the Cataracts defeated the Conception Bay North Cee Bee Stars 4–games-to-0 in the Herder final to win the hockey club's first provincial senior hockey championship since 1982. The club was denied a repeat in 2012, losing the Herder final to the Clarenville Caribous in five games.

In game six of the 2014 Herder final, Cataracts' import and league scoring champion Rob Hennigar scored a power play goal in sudden death overtime to win the series four-games-to-two to capture the Herder Memorial Trophy.

The following year Cataracts repeated as all-Newfoundland champions after import player Cam Fergus scored the series-winning winner in overtime to sweep the 2015 Herder final in four games.

In 2016, in a new Herder championship format, the Cataracts completed the Herder three-peat following a sweep of the St. John's Caps who were the Avalon East Senior Hockey League champions.

The Cataracts won their first Allan Cup on April 15, 2017 in Bouctouche, NB after defeating the Lacombe Generals 7–4 in the final.

After a two-year absence from the all-Newfoundland final, the Cats won the Central West championship in 2019 and then defeated the East Coast champions in five games in a best-of-seven series to win the town's 15th Herder.

== Crest and sweater design ==
Early logos used by the Cataracts

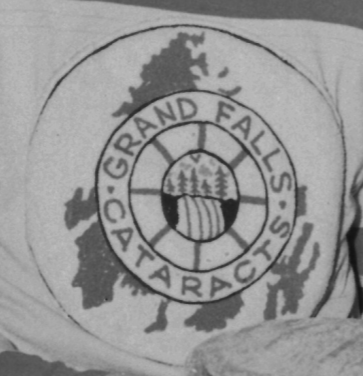
Original logo used from 1966 to 1970s

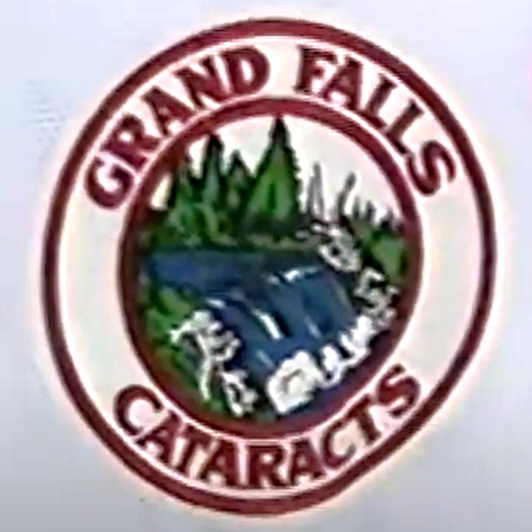
Logo used in 1980s to 1990s

The primary colours for the Cataracts' jerseys are the traditional green, white and red of the previous Grand Falls senior all-star hockey teams.

The first sweaters worn by the Cataracts hockey team in the fall of 1966 had a new crest designed by Len Sullivan that included the island of Newfoundland, a wheel and a hub containing a picture of trees and a falls. The wheel and hub symbolized Grand Falls as the hub of Newfoundland. The new crest contained the Cataracts three primary colours. The island in the background and the spokes of the wheel were green. The lettering on the wheel was red and the crest background was white.

In 1979 the Cataracts displayed new jerseys with a re-designed crest.

Since 2002 the Cataracts have adopted home and away jerseys of the National Hockey league's Minnesota Wild.

== Season-by-season record ==
Note: GP = Games played, W = Wins, L = Losses, T = Ties, OTL = Overtime Losses, Pts = Points, GF = Goals for, GA = Goals against

== Table key ==
Key of colors and symbols
Color/symbol	Explanation
‡	Herder Memorial Trophy champions
†	Led league in points

Key of terms and abbreviations
Term or abbreviation	Definition
NSHL	Newfoundland Senior Hockey League (1962-1989) or Newfoundland Senior Hockey League (2011-2014)
NSHL-C	Newfoundland Senior Hockey League (Central Division)
CBIHL	Central Beothuck Intermediate Hockey League
WCSHL	West Coast Senior Hockey League
CWSHL	Central West Senior Hockey League
GP	Number of games played
W	Number of wins
L	Number of losses
T	Number of ties
OTL	Number of losses in overtime (since the 1999–2000 season)
Finish	Final position in division or league standings
GF	Goals for (goals scored by the Cataracts)
GA	Goals against (goals scored by the Cataracts' opponents)
PTS	Number of points
—	Does not apply
DNQ	Did not qualify
n/a	Not applicable

Grand Falls-Windsor Cataracts regular season and postseason statistics and results, 1966–present
Season	League	Regular season									Local league Postseason						Herder Playoffs					
Season	League	GP	W	L	T	OTL	GF	GA	PTS	Finish	GP	W	L	GF	GA	Result	GP	W	L	GF	GA	Result
1966-67	NSHL	40	15	22	3	-	146	162	33	5th	-	-	-	-	-	-	-	-	-	-	-	DNQ
1967-68	NSHL	40	21	15	4	-	197	156	46†	1st	-	-	-	-	-	-	7	3	4	31	30	Lost Herder semi-finals 3–4 to Corner Brook Royals
1968-69	NSHL	40	17	16	7	-	153	150	41	3rd	-	-	-	-	-	-	6	2	4	19	36	Lost Herder semi-finals 2–4 to Gander Flyers
1969-70	NSHL	40	17	18	5	-	173	185	39	4th	-	-	-	-	-	-	7	3	4	30	29	Lost Herder semi-finals 3–4 to Gander Flyers
1970-71	NSHL	36	14	17	5	-	148	149	33	3rd	-	-	-	-	-	-	7	4	3	27	16	Won Herder Memorial Trophy vs. St. John's Capitals, 4-3‡
1971-72	NSHL	36	25	8	3	-	188	98	53†	1st	-	-	-	-	-	-	12	12	0	77	24	Won Herder Memorial Trophy vs. St. John's Capitals, 4-0‡
1972-73	NSHL	36	17	18	1	-	158	149	35	3rd	-	-	-	-	-	-	12	4	8	38	54	Lost Herder finals to St. John's Capitals, 0-4
1973-74	NSHL	32	17	11	4	-	171	136	38	2nd	-	-	-	-	-	-	10	5	5	64	54	Lost Herder finals to St. John's Capitals, 1-4
1974-75	NSHL	16	8	6	2	-	84	66	18	2nd	-	-	-	-	-	-	2	0	2	11	13	Lost Herder semi-finals to Corner Brook Royals, 0-2
1975-76	NSHL	20	12	6	2	-	111	71	26	2nd	-	-	-	-	-	-	8	4	4	43	37	Lost Herder finals to St. John's Capitals, 1-4
1976-77	NSHL	32	11	19	2	-	161	179	24	3rd, West	-	-	-	-	-	-	3	1	2	21	21	Lost Herder quarter-finals to Gander Flyers, 1-2
1977-78	NSHL	32	19	12	1	-	200	163	39	3rd, West	-	-	-	-	-	-	3	0	3	8	25	Lost Herder quarter-finals to Gander Flyers, 0-3
1978-79	NSHL	30	8	15	7	-	135	172	23	5th	-	-	-	-	-	-	-	-	-	-	-	Did not Qualify for playoffs
1979-80	NSHL	34	17	15	2	-	191	170	36	3rd	-	-	-	-	-	-	4	1	3			Lost semi-finals 1–3 to Labatt BlueCaps
1980-81	NSHL	32	20	9	3	-	198	138	43†	1st	-	-	-	-	-	-	11	8	3	47	33	Won Herder Memorial Trophy vs. Corner Brook Royals, 4-2‡
1981-82	NSHL	32	19	10	3	-	212	148	41	2nd	-	-	-	-	-	-	12	7	5	26	28	Won Herder Memorial Trophy vs. Gander Flyers, 4-3‡
1982-83	NSHL	32	19	11	2	-	174	134	40	2nd	-	-	-	-	-	-	12	6	6	35	38	Lost Herder finals 3–4 to Stephenville Jets
1983-84	CBIHL	24	13	8	3	-			29	3rd	13	9	4			Won CBIHL Championship	-	-	-	-	-	n/a
1984-85	NSHL	36	7	28	1	-	170	258	15	4th	-	-	-	-	-	-	3	0	3	9	26	Lost Herder semi-finals 0–3 to Corner Brook Royals
1992-93	CBIHL	24	11	12	1	-	145	168	23	4th	4	0	4			Lost league semi-finals to Gander Flyers 4 games to 0.	-	-	-	-	-	DNQ
1993-94	CBIHL	21	6	14	1	-	89	156	13	4th												
2002-03	WCSHL																					-
2003-04	WCSHL																					-
2004-05	WCSHL																					-
2005-06	WCSHL																					-
2006-07	WCSHL																					-
2007-08	WCSHL																					-
2008-09	WCSHL	24	12	12			110	116	25	3rd												lost 1–4 to Clarenville Caribous
2009-10	WCSHL	24	16	8			124	83	33	2nd												lost 2–4 to Clarenville Caribous
2010-11	NSHL	24	15	6	-	3	134	95	33†	1st	-	-	-	-	-	-						Won Herder Memorial Trophy vs. CBN Eastlink CeeBee Stars, 4-0‡
2011-12	NSHL	24	15	7	-	2	109	77	32	2nd	-	-	-	-	-	-	5	1	4	14	19	Lost Herder finals to Clarenville Caribous 1-4
2012-13	NSHL	24	20	3	-	1	114	78	41†	1st	-	-	-	-	-	-						Lost Herder semi-finals
2013-14	NSHL	24	19	5	-	0	124	70	38†	1st	-	-	-	-	-	-						Won Herder Memorial Trophy‡
2014-15	CWSHL	24	13	10	-	1	99	82	27	2nd												Won Herder Memorial Trophy vs. Corner Brook Royals, 4-0‡
2015-16	CWSHL	22	15	6	-	1	98	72	31†	1st	10	8	2	45	17	Won CWSHL championship vs. Corner Brook Royals, 4-1	3	3	0	23	4	Won Herder Memorial Trophy vs. St. John's Toyota Plaza Caps, 3-0‡
2016-17	CWSHL	18	13	2	-	3	76	52	29†	1st						Lost CWSHL championship in OT to Clarenville Caribous, 3-4	-	-	-	-	-	DNQ
2017-18	CWSHL	16	6	10	-	0	55	65	12	3rd						Lost CWSHL semi-final in OT to Clarenville Caribous, 1-4	-	-	-	-	-	DNQ
2018-19	NSHL-C	17	10	5	-	2	65	48	22	2nd	6	4	2	23	18	Won Central Division championship vs. Gander Flyers, 4-2	5	4	1	16	10	Won Herder Memorial Trophy vs. Southern Shore Breakers, 4-1‡
2023-24	CWSHL	18	13	4	-	1	118	74	27	2nd	9	5	4	40	31	Lost CWSHL championship vs. Deer Lake Red Wings, 1-4	-	-	-	-	-	DNQ
2024-25	CWSHL	18	5	10	2	1	74	87	13	3rd	5	1	4	7	23	Lost CWSHL semi-finals vs. Deer Lake Red Wings, 1-4	-	-	-	-	-	DNQ
2025-26	CWSHL	18	11	7	-	-	96	61	22	2nd	5	1	4	15	23	Lost CWSHL semi-finals vs. Deer Lake Red Wings, 1-4	-	-	-	-	-	DNQ

== Allan Cup results ==
Year	Location	GP	W	L	T	OTL	GF	GA	Round-robin results	Playoffs Result
1971	Galt, Ont	5	2	3	-	-	16	19	-	Lost Eastern final to Galt Hornets, 2-3
1972	Barrie, Ontario (games 1, 2), Grand Falls, NL (games 3, 4)	4	0	4	0	0	7	21	-	Lost Eastern final to Barrie Flyers, 0-4
1981	Thunder Bay, Ontario	4	1	3	0	0	12	27	-	Lost Eastern semi-final to Petrolia Squires, 3-6
1982	Sarnia, Ontario	6	2	3	0	1	21	32	-	Lost Eastern final to Petrolia Squires, 0-3
2012	Lloydminster, Sask	4	1	2	0	1	12	17	3rd Pool One	Lost semi-final to South East Prairie Thunder
2015	Clarenville, NL	4	2	1	0	1	14	12	2nd Division One	OT loss semi-final to Bentley Generals
2016	Steinbach, MB	3	2	1	0	0	9	8	1st Division One	Lost semi-final to South East Prairie Thunder, 3-2
2017	Bouctouche, NB	4	4	0	0	0	17	9	1st Division Two	Won Allan Cup vs. Lacombe Generals, 7-4

== Players and personnel ==
=== Current roster ===
For the current team roster see the Cataracts team page on the league website

=== Team captains ===
- Leo Murphy, 1967–69, 1970–71
- Al Dwyer, 1969–70, 1973–74
- Jim Beckman, 1971–73
- Harold Stanley, 1975–76
- Roger Grimes, 1977–78
- Tony Grimes, 1978–79
- Roger Elliott, 1980–81
- Gene Faulkner, 1981–82, 1984–85
- Wayne Little, 1992–93
- Brian Grouchy, 2002–03
- Brad Lewis, 2006–13
- Mike Brent, 2013–19, 2023–24
- Cody Drover, 2024–25

=== Head coaches ===
- Nick Mickoski, 1966–69
- Len "Comet" Haley (playing-coach), 1969
- Jim Beckman (playing-coach), 1969–70
- Marc Pichette , 1970–73
- Leo Murphy (playing-coach), 1973–76
- Roger Grimes (playing-coach), 1976–77
- Joe Grimes, 1977–78
- Al Dwyer, 1978–79
- Joe Byrne, 1979-1980, 1980-1981, 1981-1982
- Cecil Thomas, 1982–83
- Gord Gallant (playing-coach), 1982–83, 1984–85
- Alex Faulkner, Tony Grimes, 1984-1985
- Steve Croucher (playing-coach), 1992–93
- Mike Browne, John McSween 2002-2003
- Robert Goulding 2003-2004
- Robert Goulding, Barry Manual 2004-2005
- Tony Walsh, Barry Manual 2005-2006
- Barry Manual, 2006–2007, 2007-2008
- Walt Lewis, 2008–09
- Paul Glavine, 2009–10
- Brian Casey, 2010–11, 2011–2012
- Shane Lukinchuk, 2012–2015
- Tom Coolen, 2015–2016, 2016-2017
- Pat Yetman , 2017-2018, 2018-2019
- Paul Whelan, 2023–24, 2024–25
- Cody White 2025-26, 2026-27

== Team awards ==
=== Team MVP ===
(Cataracts most valuable player in the regular season)

- Leo Murphy, 1968
- Fred Janes, 1969 (awarded the first F.W. Rowe Gold Medal)
- Keith Boone, 1982 (B & B Sports Trophy)
- Tyler Whitehead, 2011
- Cam Fergus, 2016
- Jordan Maher, 2024

=== Gus Bartlett Memorial Award ===
(A memorial to long-time Grand Falls resident Augustus "Gus" Bartlett, donated by his three children, to the player chosen for having the most ability and dedication)

- Gene Faulkner, 1982

=== Playoffs MVP team award ===
(Cataracts most valuable player in the playoffs)

- Mark Locken, 1981

=== The Mary Beson-Louise Walsh Memorial Trophy ===
(Cataracts most improved player in the regular season)

- George Penney, 1981
- Tony Walsh, 1982

=== The Coffin Cup ===
(The Stanley Coffin Memorial Award, in memory of the former President, presented to the Grand Falls-Windsor Cataracts' most Valuable player)

- Cody Drover, 2025

=== James "Bucky" Hannaford Jr. Award ===
(Awarded to the player who shows dedication to the team both on and off the ice)

- Tony Cuomo, 1982 (James Hannaford Memorial Trophy)
- Mike Brent, 2011
- Sam Hounsell, 2013
- Nicklas Lindstrom, 2016
- Nicklas Lindstrom, 2017
- Neil Oake, 2025

=== The Cohen's Cup ===
(Awarded to the Cataract receiving the most points on 3-Star selection during the regular season)

- Andre Gill, 2012–13
- Andre Gill, 2013–14
- Cam Fergus, 2014–15
- Mike Brent, 2015–16
- Danny Wicks, 2016–17
- Danny Wicks, 2017–18
- A.J. Whiffen, 2018–19

== Local league trophies and awards ==
=== Regional league team awards ===
- First place in the West Coast Senior Hockey League: 2011
- First place in the Central West Senior Hockey League: 2016
- CWSHL championship: 2015, 2016

=== Local league individual awards ===
League MVP (in the regular season)

- Cam Fergus, 2016
- Collin Circelli, 2017

Top Scorer (in the regular season)

- Cam Fergus, 2016
- Jordan Maher, 2024
- Cody Drover, 2025

Top goal scorer (in the regular season)

- Chad Earle, 2011
- Cam Fergus, 2016

Coach of the Year (in the regular season)

- Brian Casey, 2011
- Tom Coolen, 2016
- Tom Coolen, 2017
- Paul Whelan, 2024
- Cody White, 2026

Top Goalie (in the regular season)

- A.J. Whiffen, 2016
- Bryan Gillis, 2017
- A.J. Whiffen, 2019

Top Defenseman (in the regular season)

- Luke Gallant, 2016
- Nick Lindstrom, 2019

Rookie of the Year (in the regular season)

- Chad Earle, 2011
- Ethan Simms, 2024

Most Gentlemanly and Effective Player (in the regular Season)

- Cody Drover, 2024
- Jordan Maher, 2025

== Provincial League Trophies and Awards ==
=== HNL team awards ===
- Nine all-Newfoundland senior hockey championships (Herder Memorial Trophy): 1971, 1972, 1981, 1982, 2011, 2014, 2015, 2016, 2019
- Awarded the Evening Telegram Trophy four times for the best regular season record in the provincial senior league: 1968, 1972, 1981, 2011, 2013, 2014

=== HNL individual awards ===
S. E Tuma Memorial Trophy (Top scorer in the regular season)

- Charlie Greene, 1975
- Gene Faulkner, 1976
- Dennis Goulding, 1977
- Bruce Campbell, 1982
- Ron Hennigar, 2014

T.A. (Gus) Soper Memorial Award (Most valuable player in the Senior "A" leagues in the regular season)

- Jason Stone, 2006
- A.J. Whiffen, 2013
- Ron Hennigar, 2014
- Cam Fergus, 2016

Albert "Peewee" Crane Memorial Trophy (Senior league rookie of the year)

- Terry French, 1969
- Don Howse, 1972
- Brandon Nicholas, 2008
- Chad Earle, 2011

Howie Clouter Memorial Trophy (Most Gentlemanly and Effective Player in the regular season)

- Al Dwyer Jr., 1974, 1975
- Dan Flynn, 1981
- Bruce Campbell, 1982
- Troy Thompson, 2006
- Andre Gill, 2010
- Danny Wicks, 2018
- Danny Wicks, 2019
- Cody Drover, 2024

Silver Tray/President's Shield Goaltender Award (Top goaltender in the regular season)

- Fred Janes, 1968, 1969
- Jean-Guy Morissette, 1972
- Rocky Martin, 1973
- Terry John, 1976
- Eddie Davis, 1982
- Mark Yetman, 2012
- A.J. Whiffen, 2013
- A.J. Whiffen, 2014
- A.J. Whiffen, 2016
- A.J. Whiffen, 2019

Top Defenseman (Top defenseman in the regular season)

- Rodi Short, 2014
- Luke Gallant, 2016

Coach of the Year

- Shane Lukinchuk, 2014
- Tom Coolen, 2016

Cliff Gorman Memorial Award (Most valuable player of the Herder Playoffs)

- A.J. Whiffen, 2014
- Cam Fergus, 2015
- Luke Gallant, 2016

== Honoured members ==
Note: (the year honoured is noted)

=== Retired/honoured numbers ===
- #7 Al Dwyer Jr.
- #12 Jim Temple
- #8 Gene Faulkner (2011)
- #55 Martin Lapointe (2015)
- #16 Clar Goulding (2017)
- # Wayne Faulkner (2017)
- # James "Bucky" Hannaford (2018)
- # Cec Thomas (2018)
- #18 Terry Ryan Sr. (2023)
- #25 Don Howse (2023)
- #5 Terry French (2023)
- #20 Tony White (2023)
- #27 Brian Casey (2023)

=== Honoured Builders ===
- Walter Davis (2018)
- Stan Coffin (2023)

=== NL Hockey Hall of Fame ===
The following people associated with the Cataracts have been inducted into the Newfoundland and Labrador Hockey Hall of Fame. (Note: the year of induction is noted)

- Alex Faulkner (1994)
- Joe Byrne (1995)
- Allan Dwyer Jr. (1996)
- Walt Davis (1999)
- Leo Murphy (1999)
- Harold Stanley (2000)
- Don Howse (2000)
- Jim Temple (2001)
- Gene Faulkner (2001)
- Harry Katrynuk (2007)
- Clarence Goulding (2008)
- Allan Bargery (2009)
- Wayne Faulkner (2013)
- Cecil Thomas (2018)
- Bob Molloy (2021)
- Brian Casey (2022)

== Broadcasting ==
Grand Falls radio station CKCM was the main broadcaster of Cataracts' games from the 1960s to 1990s. Originally owned by The Colonial Broadcasting System Ltd., CKCM was an affiliate of VOCM (AM) and had its first broadcast in July 1962. The station stopped all local programming in September 2016.

Since 2011, George Scott has hosted a live webcast of Cataracts' games in the regular season and all playoff games.

Years	Play-by-play	Colour commentators
1960s	(CKCM) John Murphy, Bruce MacDonald	
1970s	(CKCM) John Murphy, Bruce MacDonald, Terry Hart	
1980s	(CKCM) Roger Barnett, Terry Hart, Glenn Davis	
1990s	(CKCM) Roger Barnett, Terry Hart	
2011 to present	George Scott	Robert "Watsie" Goulding, Barry Manual
