= West Coast Senior Hockey League =

The West Coast Senior Hockey League (WCSHL) is a senior ice hockey league with teams based in Newfoundland and Labrador. The WCSHL was founded in 1996 as a senior B intermediate league and developed into a senior A league. It operated until the summer of 2011 when the WCSHL merged with the Avalon East Senior Hockey League to form the Newfoundland Senior Hockey League.

The league resurfaced for the 2016–2017 season, with that season being shortened. For the 2017–2018 season it played an 18-game season, with teams based out of Corner Brook, Deer Lake, Stephenville, and Port aux Basques.

The league returned to action for the 2022-23 season with three competing teams from Corner Brook, Deer Lake, and Port aux Basques.

== Current Teams ==
Corner Brook Royals

Deer Lake Red Wings

Port-aux-Basques Mariners

Stephenville Lightning

== League Champions ==
- 1996
- 1997
- 1998
- 1999
- 2000
- 2001 Deer Lake Red Wings
- 2002 Corner Brook Royals
- 2003 Corner Brook Royals
- 2004 Corner Brook Royals
- 2005 Deer Lake Red Wings
- 2006 Deer Lake Red Wings
- 2007 Deer Lake Red Wings
- 2008 Deer Lake Red Wings
- 2009 Clarenville Caribous
- 2010 Clarenville Caribous
- 2011 Grand Falls-Windsor Cataracts

== League Trophies and Awards ==
=== Top Goaltender Award (donated by Corner Brook West Sports Club) ===
Season	Winner	Team
1996-1997	Chris Brothers	Corner Brook Royals
1997-1998	Tyrone McIsaac	Stephenville Jets
1998-1999	Mark Hurley	Badger Bombers
1999-2000		
2000-2001	Chris Grant	Corner Brook Royals
2001-2002	Chris Grant	Corner Brook Royals
2002-2003	Graham Cook	Deer Lake Red Wings
2003-2004	Brad Wall	Grand Falls-Windsor Cataracts
2004-2005		
2005-2006	Jason Stone	Grand Falls-Windsor Cataracts
2006-2007		
2007-2008		
2008-2009		
2009-2010		
2017-2018	Bradley Dyke #88	Corner Brook ROYALS

== Herder Champions ==
- 2001 Corner Brook Royals
- 2002 Deer Lake Red Wings
- 2005 Deer Lake Red Wings
- 2009 Clarenville Caribous
- 2010 Clarenville Caribous
- 2011 Grand Falls-Windsor Cataracts

== Allan Cup Results ==
- 2011 Clarenville Caribous (2011 Allan Cup champions)
