= Evening Telegram Trophy =

- Sport: Ice hockey
- Awarded for: Best regular season record in an active Newfoundland & Labrador senior hockey league

History
- First award: 1954
- Most recent: HGOE CeeBee Stars

The Evening Telegram Trophy is presented to the team with the best record in the senior A hockey leagues operating in Newfoundland and Labrador.

== History ==
The owners of the Evening Telegram newspaper originally donated a trophy in 1954 to be presented annually to the champions of the new senior section 'B' division of the Newfoundland Amateur Hockey Association. The section B league was formed for teams with no 'import' or paid players on their roster. The B Division was disbanded after the 1959 Championships and the Evening Telegram Trophy was retired.

The trophy was not awarded in 1960 & 1961. In 1962, the Trophy was awarded to the winner of the senior league's new Eastern Division. (The S.E. Tuma Trophy, donated by the Corner Brook jewellery firm, was awarded to the 1962 Western Division champions). From 1963 thru 1989, the newly formed island-wide Newfoundland Senior Hockey League team that finished first place in the regular season was presented with the Evening Telegram Trophy. The NSHL disbanded after 1989 and the trophy was not awarded from 1990 thru 1992.

Beginning in 1993, the trophy was awarded to the team with the best winning average among the existing senior 'A' leagues in the province.

== Winners ==
Evening Telegram Trophy winners
Year	Winner	Awarded to
1954	Bell Island All-Stars	Section B Champions
1955	Bell Island All-Stars	Section B Champions
1956	Bell Island All-Stars	Section B Champions
1957	Grand Falls Bees	Section B Champions
1958	Grand Falls Bees	Section B Champions
1959	Grand Falls Bees	Section B Champions
1960 to 1961	Not awarded	
1962	Conception Bay CeeBees	First place Eastern Division NAHA
1963	Buchans Miners	First place NSHL
1964 to 1967	Not awarded	
1968	Grand Falls Cataracts	First place NSHL
1969	Gander Flyers	First place NSHL
1970	St. John's Capitals	First place NSHL
1971	St. John's Capitals	First place NSHL
1972	Grand Falls Cataracts	First place NSHL
1973	Corner Brook Royals	First place NSHL
1974	St. John's Capitals	First place NSHL
1975	St. John's Capitals	First place NSHL
1976	St. John's Capitals	First place NSHL
1977	Corner Brook Royals	First place NSHL
1978	St. John's Blue Caps	First place NSHL
1979	Gander Flyers	First place NSHL
1980	Gander Flyers	First place NSHL
1981	Grand Falls Cataracts	First place NSHL
1982	Gander Flyers	First place NSHL
1983	Stephenville Jets	First place NSHL
1984	Stephenville Jets	First place NSHL
1985	Stephenville Jets	First place NSHL
1986	Stephenville Jets	First place NSHL
1987	St. John's Capitals	First place NSHL
1988 -	St. John's Capitals	First place NSHL
1989	St. John's Capitals	First place NSHL
1990 to 1992	Not awarded	
1993	Bell Island (of CBSHL)	Best winning average of senior leagues
1994	Southern Shore Breakers (of AWSHL)	Best winning average of senior leagues
1995	Southern Shore Breakers (of AWSHL)	Best winning average of senior leagues
1996	St. John's Capitals (of AWSHL)	Best winning average of senior leagues
1997	Flatrock Flyers (of AESHL)	Best winning average of senior leagues
1998	Southern Shore Breakers (of AESHL)	Best winning average of senior leagues
1999	Badger Bombers (of WCSHL)	Best winning average of senior leagues
2000	Southern Shore Breakers (of AWSHL)	Best winning average of senior leagues
2001	Flatrock Flyers (of AESHL)	Best winning average of senior leagues
2002	Flatrock Flyers (of AESHL)	Best winning average of senior leagues
2003	Flatrock Flyers (of AESHL)	Best winning average of senior leagues
2004	Southern Shore Breakers	Best winning average of senior leagues
2005	Southern Shore Breakers (of AESHL)	Best winning average of senior leagues
2006	Conception Bay CeeBees (of AESHL)	Best winning average of senior leagues
2007	Conception Bay CeeBees (of AESHL)	Best winning average of senior leagues
2008	Conception Bay CeeBees (of AESHL)	Best winning average of senior leagues
2009	Conception Bay CeeBees (of AESHL)	Best winning average of senior leagues
2010	Conception Bay CeeBees (of AESHL)	Best winning average of senior leagues
2011	Conception Bay CeeBees (of AESHL)	Best winning average of senior leagues
2012	Clarenville Caribous	First place NSHL
2013	Grand Falls-Windsor Cataracts	First place NSHL
2014	Grand Falls-Windsor Cataracts	First place NSHL
2015	Not awarded	
2016	Northeast Sr. Eagles (of AESHL)	Best winning average of senior leagues (.870)
2017	Harbour Grace Ocean Enterprises CeeBee Stars (of AESHL)	Best winning average of senior leagues (.857)
