= Corner Brook Royals =

Ice hockey team in Newfoundland and Labrador, Canada

- City: Corner Brook, Newfoundland and Labrador
- League: West Coast Senior Hockey League
- Founded: 1955
- Home arena: Corner Brook Civic Centre; Humber Gardens (1955-1997)
- Colours: Blue, Red, Cream
- Website: Official website Royals on league website

Franchise history
- 1935–1949: Corner Brook
- 1949–1955: Corner Brook All-Stars
- 1955–2012: Corner Brook Royals
- 2012–2014: Western Royals
- 2014–present: Corner Brook Royals

The Corner Brook Royals are a senior ice hockey team based in Corner Brook, Newfoundland and Labrador and a current member of the Central West Senior Hockey League (CWSHL).

== History ==
The Corner Brook Royals have their roots in picked teams from the local senior league beginning in 1927. Hockey in Corner Brook was first organized in 1925 following the completion of the pulp and paper mill. The first team of Corner Brook's best players, picked from the local league, was in February 1927 for a series with a visiting team from Sydney, Nova Scotia. That same year, a picked Corner Brook team played the first inter-papertown home-and-home series with a Grand Falls team in what would be an annual competition for the Tuma Cup.

In 1935, the St. John's league sent an invitation to the western champions for a series at the Prince's Rink to determine the first Newfoundland hockey champions. After winning its intertown series with Grand Falls, it was agreed that Corner Brook would represent western Newfoundland. The Corner Brook team defeated the Guards in the final game and was presented the recently donated Herder Memorial Trophy as the first all-Newfoundland champions.

The Corner Brook All-Stars were renamed the Royals in 1955 after the opening of the new Humber Gardens. The Royals' first provincial playoff action was in the all-Newfoundland section 'B' semi-finals in February 1956 against the Grand Falls Bees for the Evening Telegram Trophy. In 1958 and 1959, the Royals entered teams in both the section A and section B provincial playoffs.

In 1985, the Royals were the first Newfoundland team to win the G. P. Bolton Memorial Cup as Eastern Canadian senior hockey champions and hosted the 1985 Allan Cup championship. The series went to seven games but the Royals lost the series to the Thunder Bay Twins.

The following season, the Royals repeated as all-Newfoundland and Eastern Canadian champions. In the 1986 Allan Cup final, the Royals defeated the Nelson Maple Leafs in four straight games to become the first team from Newfoundland and Labrador to win the Allan Cup, the symbol of Canadian senior hockey supremacy.

Until 2012, the team's home arena was the Pepsi Centre, formerly the Canada Games Centre when it was built for the 1999 Canada Games. In August 2012, the team was renamed the Western Royals, and moved to Deer Lake due to increased cost of using the Pepsi Centre, and low turnout at games. Due to the low attendance at games, live radio broadcasts on CFCB ceased, hoping to get more people at the game.

Before the start of the 2014–15 season, the club was renamed the Corner Brook Royals and its home ice was the Corner Brook Civic Centre, the former Pepsi Centre.

== Seasons and records ==
=== Season-by-season results ===
This is a list of the last five seasons completed by the Royals. For the full season-by-season history, see List of Corner Brook Royals seasons.

Note: GP = Games played, W = Wins, L = Losses, T = Ties, OTL = Overtime Losses, Pts = Points, GF = Goals for, GA = Goals against

WCSHL = West Coast Senior Hockey League, NSHL = Newfoundland Senior Hockey League, CWSHL = Central West Senior Hockey League. WCSHL = West Coast Senior Hockey League

Corner Brook Royals regular season and postseason statistics and results, 2010–present
Season	League	Regular season								Postseason					
Season	League	GP	W	L	OTL	GF	GA	PTS	Finish	GP	W	L	GF	GA	Result
2012–13	NSHL	24	13	11	0	108	115	26	3rd						Lost in semi-finals to Clarenville Caribous
2013-14	NSHL	24	11	10	3	87	83	25	3rd	7	3	4	24	22	Lost in Herder semi-finals to Grand Falls-Windsor Cataracts, 1-4
2014-15	CWSHL	24	14	10	0	89	82	28	1st	8	4	4	33	24	Lost in Herder finals to Grand Falls-Windsor Cataracts, 0-4
2015–16	CWSHL	22	12	10	0	87	88	24	2nd	12	5	7	34	43	Lost CWSHL finals to Grand Falls-Windsor Cataracts, 1-4
2016-17	WCSHL														Won WCSHL championship vs. Deer Lake Red Wings
2017-18	WCSHL	18	15	3	0	85	55	26	1st	6	2	4	10	31	Lost WCSHL championship to Deer Lake Red Wings, 0-4

- Notes: The Royals relocated to Deer Lake for the 2012–13 and 2013–2014 seasons and were known as the Western Royals.

== Allan Cup results ==
Season	Location	GP	W	L	OTL	GF	GA	Results
1968	Winnipeg, Manitoba	8	4	4				Lost in Eastern semi-finals vs. Victoriaville Tigers, 1-3
1985	Corner Brook, NL	14	10	4				Lost Allan Cup final vs. (Thunder Bay Twins, 3-4
1986	Nelson, BC	11	8	3				Won Allan Cup final vs. Nelson Maple Leafs, 4-0

== Current roster ==
The current team roster is on the West Coast Senior Hockey League website

== Leaders ==
=== Captains ===
- Craig Kennedy (1985–86)
- Darren Colbourne (2007–08)
- Morgan Warren (2008–09)
- Michael Hynes (2014–16)

=== Coaches ===
- Jim Grant (1979–80)
- Terry Gillam (playing-coach 1979–80)
- Forbes Kennedy (1980–81)
- Steve Robson (playing-coach 1983–84)
- Bobby Clarke (1984–85)
- Mike Anderson (1985–87)
- Gus Greco (playing-coach 1987–89)
- Terry Gillam (1989-1990)
- Rob French (2007–08)
- Angus Head (2008–09)
- Darren Langdon (2014–16)

== Trophies and awards ==
=== Team awards ===
- Awarded the Allan Cup in 1986 as Canadian Senior hockey champions.
- Two Eastern Canadian hockey championships (G.P. Bolton Memorial Cup): 1985, 1986.
- Ten all-Newfoundland senior hockey championships (Herder Memorial Trophy): 1935, 1962, 1964, 1966, 1968, 1977, 1985, 1986, 1988, 2001
- First place in the Newfoundland Senior Hockey League (Evening Telegram Trophy): 1964, 1966, 1973, 1977,
- First place in the Central West Senior Hockey League: 2015

=== Individual awards ===
S.E. Tuma Memorial Trophy (Top scorer in the regular season)

- Frank Dorrington, 1970, 1973, 1974
- Robbie Forbes, 1986
- Craig Jenkins, 1988

T.A. (Gus) Soper Memorial Award (MVP in the regular season)

- Bruce Campbell, 1981
- Dave Matte, 1986
- Dan Cormier, 1988

Albert "Peewee" Crane Memorial Trophy (Senior league rookie of the year)

- Bram Pike, 1971
- Dave Oxford, 1974
- Rob Brown, 1984
- Kev McCarthy, 1985
- Ken Mercer, 1986
- Brent Jenkins, 1989

Howie Clouter memorial Trophy (Most sportsmanlike player in the regular season)

- Robbie Forbes, 1987
- Craig Jenkins, 1988
- Darren McWhirter, 1989

Top Goaltender Award (Top goaltender in the regular season)

- Bert Brake, 1964, 1966
- Ted McComb, 1977
- Dave Matte, 1986
- Bradley Power, 2020

== Honoured members ==
=== Retired numbers ===
Note:(the date of the jersey # retirement is noted)

- #2 Joe Lundrigan
- #2 Craig Kennedy (November 2017)
- #5 Danny Cormier (2011)
- #15 Jimmy Guy (2015)
- #17 Frank (Danky) Dorrington
- #20 Terry Gillam (January 11, 2019)
- #24 Shawn Neary (January 5, 2018)
- #25 Darren Colbourne (January 2015)
- #30 Dave Matte (November 6, 2011)

=== NL Hockey Hall of Fame ===
The following people associated with the Royals have been inducted into the Newfoundland and Labrador Hockey Hall of Fame.
Note:(the year of induction into NLHHOF is noted)

- Doug Grant (1994)
- Joe Lundrigan (1995)
- Claude Anstey (1996)
- Frank (Danky) Dorrington (1996)
- Ernest Hynes (2003)
- Jim Guy (2004)
- Mike Anderson (2007)
- Ed Lawrence (2010)
- Eddie O’Quinn (2011)
- Bert Brake (2012)
- Todd Stark (2013)
- Clobie Collins (2014)
- Darren Colbourne (2015)
- James Critch (2008)

== See also ==
- List of ice hockey teams in Newfoundland and Labrador
