= Newfoundland Senior Hockey League =

Canadian sports league

- Region: Newfoundland
- Founded: September 10, 2011
- Associated titles: Herder Memorial Trophy; Allan Cup

The Newfoundland Senior Hockey League (NSHL) was a senior ice hockey league in Newfoundland and Labrador, Canada founded in 2011. The NSHL operated for three seasons from 2011–2012 to 2013–2014. The league competed for the Herder Memorial Trophy and its teams were eligible for the Allan Cup playoffs.

== History ==
The league was confirmed September 10, 2011 at the Hockey Newfoundland and Labrador AGM. The league is the result of a merger between the Avalon East Senior Hockey League and the West Coast Senior Hockey League. The league includes the province's two only Allan Cup champions, the Corner Brook Royals (1986 Allan Cup) and Clarenville Caribous (2011 Allan Cup).

The league was a Newfoundland-wide league, much like the old Newfoundland Senior Hockey League which folded in 1989.

== Teams ==
- Clarenville Caribous
- Corner Brook Royals
- Conception Bay North Eastlink CeeBee All-Stars
- Gander Flyers
- Grand Falls-Windsor Cataracts
- Mount Pearl H J Bartlett Electric Senior Blades
- Stephenville Jets

== Champions ==
- 2012 Clarenville Caribous
- 2013 Conception Bay North Cee Bee Stars
- 2014 Grand Falls-Windsor Cataracts
