= Colisée de Québec =

Multi-purpose arena in Quebec City

- Interactive map of Colisée de Québec
- Former names: Colisée de Québec (1949–1999); Colisée Pepsi (1999–2015)
- Address: 250 Boulevard Wilfrid-Hamel
- Location: Quebec City, Quebec
- Coordinates: 46°49′51″N 71°14′47″W
- Owner: Quebec City
- Operator: ExpoCité
- Capacity: 15,176
- Surface: Multi-surface

Construction
- Groundbreaking: May 24, 1949
- Opened: December 8, 1949
- Closed: September 14, 2015
- Cost: C$3 million ($40.4 million in 2025 dollars)
- Architects: Robert Blatter; Bouchard & Rinfret

Tenants
- Quebec Aces (QSHL / AHL) (1950–1971); Quebec Remparts (QMJHL) (1969–1985, 1999–2015); Quebec Nordiques (WHA / NHL) (1972–1995); Quebec Rafales (IHL) (1996–1998); Quebec Citadelles (AHL) (1999–2002); Quebec Radio X (LNAH) (2003–2008)

Colisée de Québec, known as Colisée Pepsi from 1999–2015, is a defunct multi-purpose arena located in Quebec City, Quebec. It was the home of the Quebec Nordiques from 1972 to 1995, during their time in the World Hockey Association and National Hockey League. It was also the home of the Quebec Remparts of the Quebec Major Junior Hockey League from 1999 until its closing in 2015. The Colisée hosted the Quebec International Pee-Wee Hockey Tournament each February until its closure in 2015, with almost 2,300 young hockey players from 16 countries participating annually.

The Colisée is scheduled to be demolished in 2027.

== History ==
The barrel vault arena was originally built in 1949, seating 10,034, to replace a building on the same site that had burned down a year earlier. Built by architects Rinfret and Bouchard with designs drawn up by Robert Blatter and F. Caron, the arena was a mix of International Style exterior and Art Deco interior. It was known as "The House that Béliveau Built", as it was often filled to capacity in its early years to watch Jean Béliveau star for the Quebec Aces before he moved up to the NHL and the Montreal Canadiens. Two decades later, sellout crowds came to see Guy Lafleur as a member of the Quebec Remparts, before he too would join the Canadiens.

The Colisée served as the host facility of the Quebec International Pee-Wee Hockey Tournament from 1960 to 2015, after the tournament originated at the Quebec Arena in Parc Victoria. It was promoted by Gérard Bolduc and Paul Dumont, who also had connections to the Quebec Remparts.

Le Colisée underwent major renovations in 1980. The old entrance was taken down and replaced with a massive glass facade, and the seating capacity was increased to 15,750 to meet NHL standards of that era after the Nordiques made the jump from the WHA to the NHL. PepsiCo bought the naming rights on November 18, 1999, and its final capacity was 15,176. Coincidentally, the former Quebec Nordiques, now known as the Colorado Avalanche, currently play at what was formerly known as Pepsi Center (now Ball Arena) in Denver.

The Philadelphia Flyers played the final five "home" games of the 1967–68 season at the Colisée, after the roof blew off their home arena, the Spectrum.

The arena hosted the 1971 Memorial Cup championship series, in which the Remparts defeated the Edmonton Oil Kings two games to none. Since the championship switched to a tournament format, the Coliseum has hosted it in 1991 and 2003 & 2015. Internationally, the first game of the 1974 Summit Series between Canadian WHA all-stars and the Soviet national team was played at the Coliseum, as were one game in each of the 1976 and 1991 Canada Cups. The arena co-hosted the 1978 World Junior Championships with Montreal and also co-hosted, along with Halifax, the 2008 IIHF World Championships. Rendez-vous '87, a two-game series between the NHL All-Stars and the Soviet national team, was another highlight in the building's history. Colisée Pepsi has also hosted many big concerts, as well as professional wrestling events presented by Canadian Athletic Promotions, All-Star Wrestling, Grand Prix Wrestling, Lutte Internationale and the WWF/WWE.

Quebec City has entertained several proposals in recent years to return NHL ice hockey to the city; prior to the completion of Centre Vidéotron, most of these proposals envisioned using the Colisée as a temporary home while the new arena was built next to the existing facility. On October 10, 2009, Quebec City newspapers such as Le Soleil reported that negotiations were held between the city and the NHL concerning the possibility and pertinence of relocating or creating an NHL franchise into the city.

Skatemania 2014 was held at the Colisée on October 25, 2014. The show handling the arts and figure skating produced by Alain Goldberg featuring Sylvain Cossette, Andrée Watters, Marc Hervieux, Jeanick Fournier and also Éléonore Lagacé, Andréanne Martin and Liana Bureau from La Voix. Participating athletes among others: Joannie Rochette, Patrick Chan, Shawn Sawyer.

Former Nordiques owner and Canadian Olympic Committee president Marcel Aubut originally said that there were no plans to demolish the Colisée Pepsi even if a new arena was built. Aubut mentioned a prospective future Winter Olympics bid among other justifications for maintaining the existing arena. As part of the agreement constructing the new arena, an additional $7 million was set aside for renovating the Colisée, should the city have landed a potential National Hockey League expansion franchise before the new arena was completed in 2015.

Videotron Centre opened on September 8, 2015. The Colisée's final event was a Metallica concert on September 14, 2015 for the Lords of Summer Tour; two days later, the band would also play the first concert at Videotron Centre. The Colisée was then closed to the public, with minimal operations and maintenance since.

In September 2019, the Colisée's neon sign was removed pending an expected demolition. ExpoCité announced plans to sell 4,000 of the arena's wooden seats to the public on the weekend of October 19 and 20, 2019, while the remaining 11,000 plastic seats would be given to municipalities, schools and other institutions. The city planned to start demolition by summer 2020 and finish by December 18, 2020. It was announced in 2021 that demolition would not proceed, as the building had been leased to be used as storage space. The lease ran until September 2023.

In 2024, Quebec City mayor Bruno Marchand stated that he supported demolishing the Colisée. It was announced in February of 2025 that the building would be demolished over a two year period. However, this procedure will not start until 2027 at the earliest.

=== Seating capacity ===
The seating capacity for hockey has gone as follows:

- 10,034 (1949–1973)
- 10,004 (1973–1976)
- 10,012 (1976–1981)
- 15,250 (1981–1984)
- 15,434 (1984–1987)
- 15,399 (1987–2009)
- 15,176 (2009–2015)

== Image gallery ==
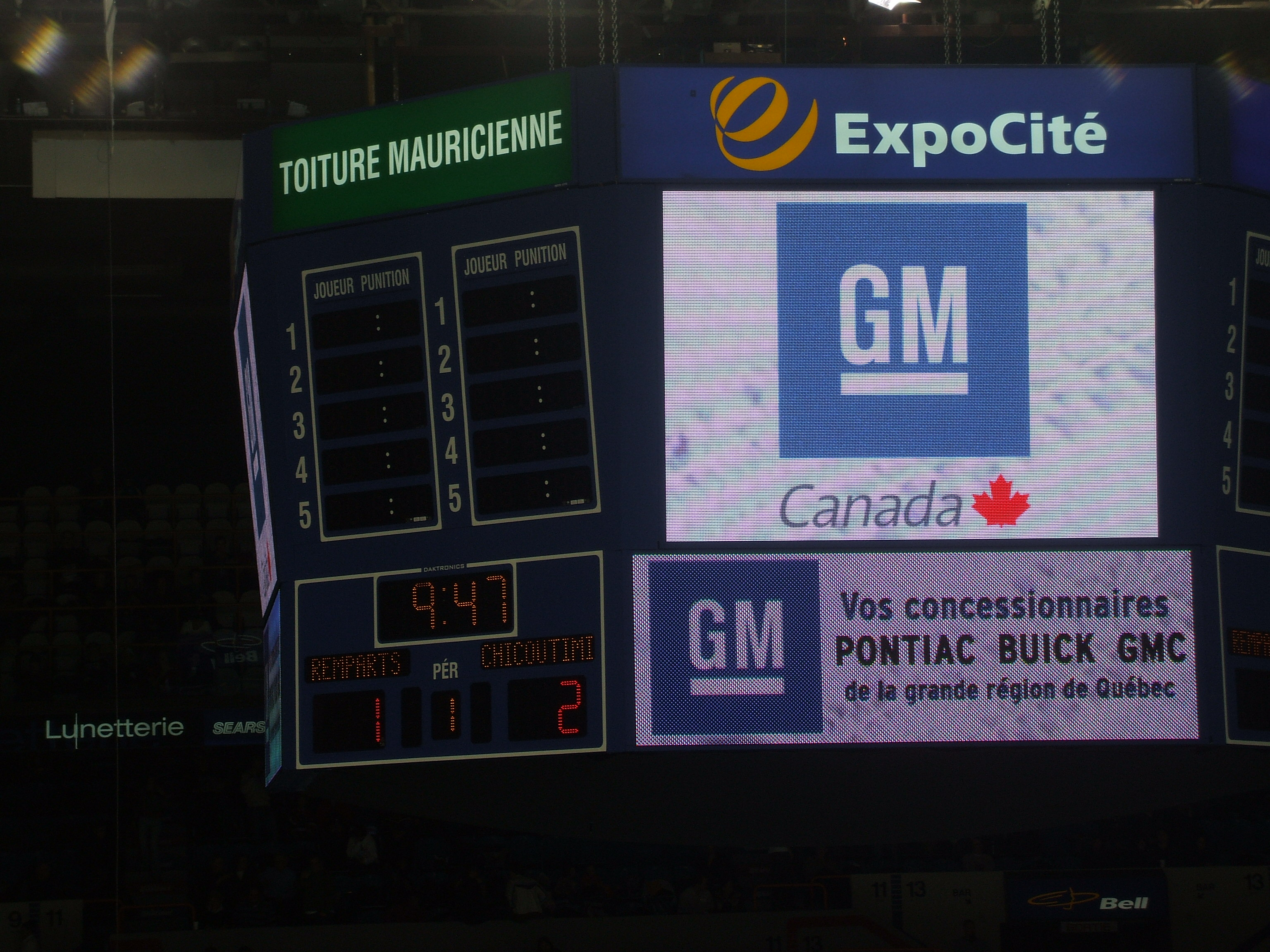
The scoreboard in 2007

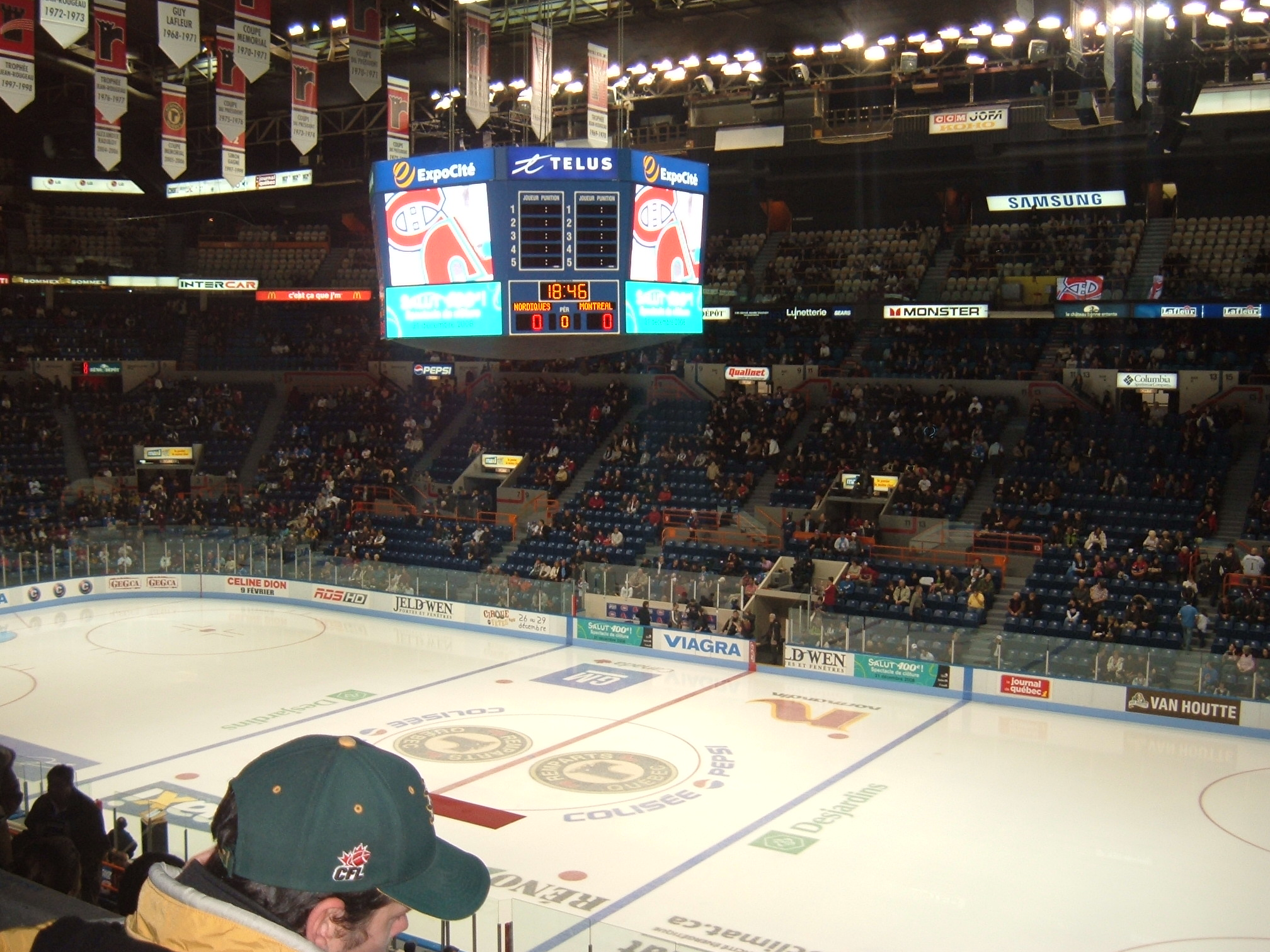
Interior of the Colisée seen from the centre

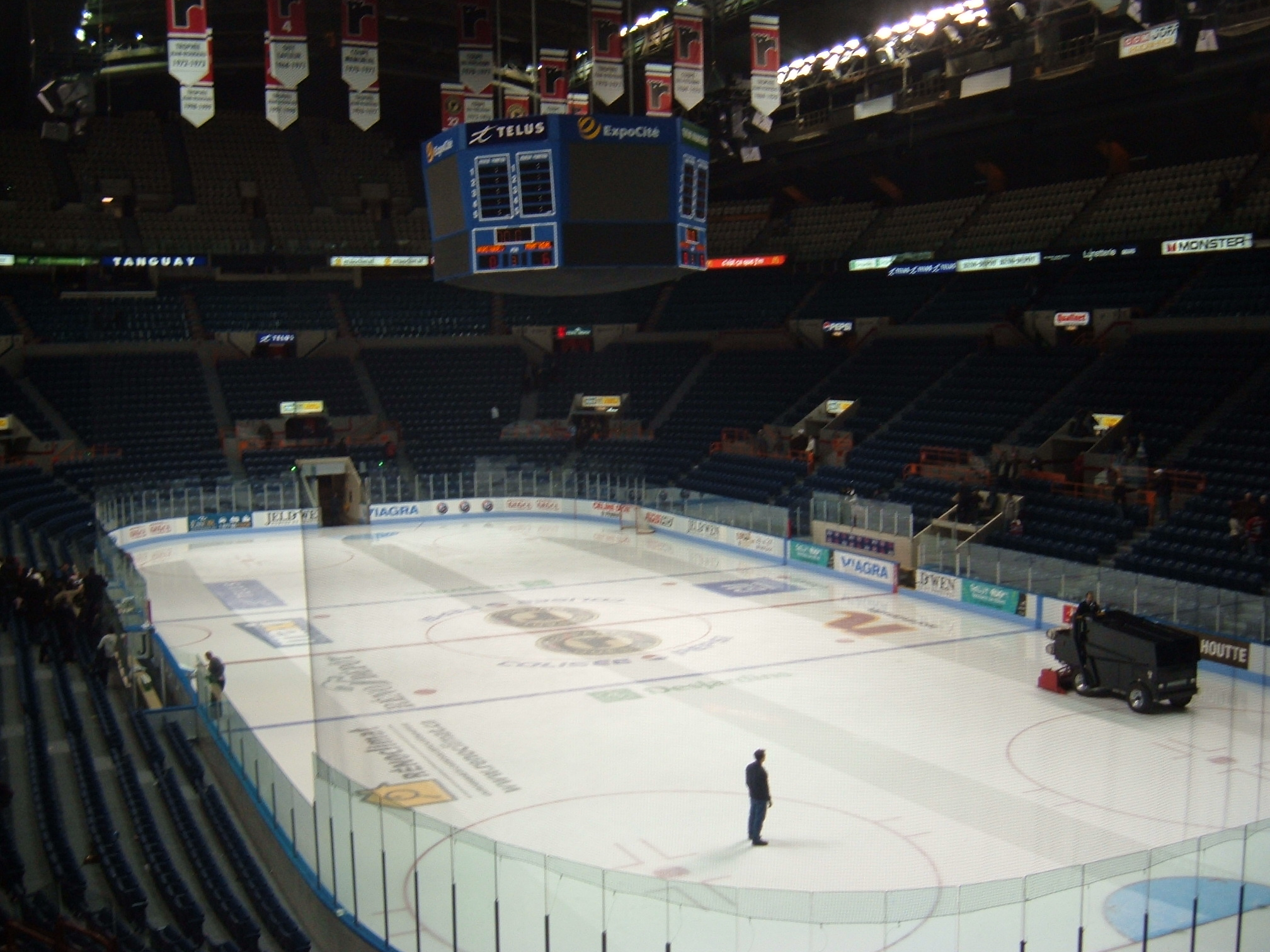
Interior of the Colisée taken on December 7, 2008

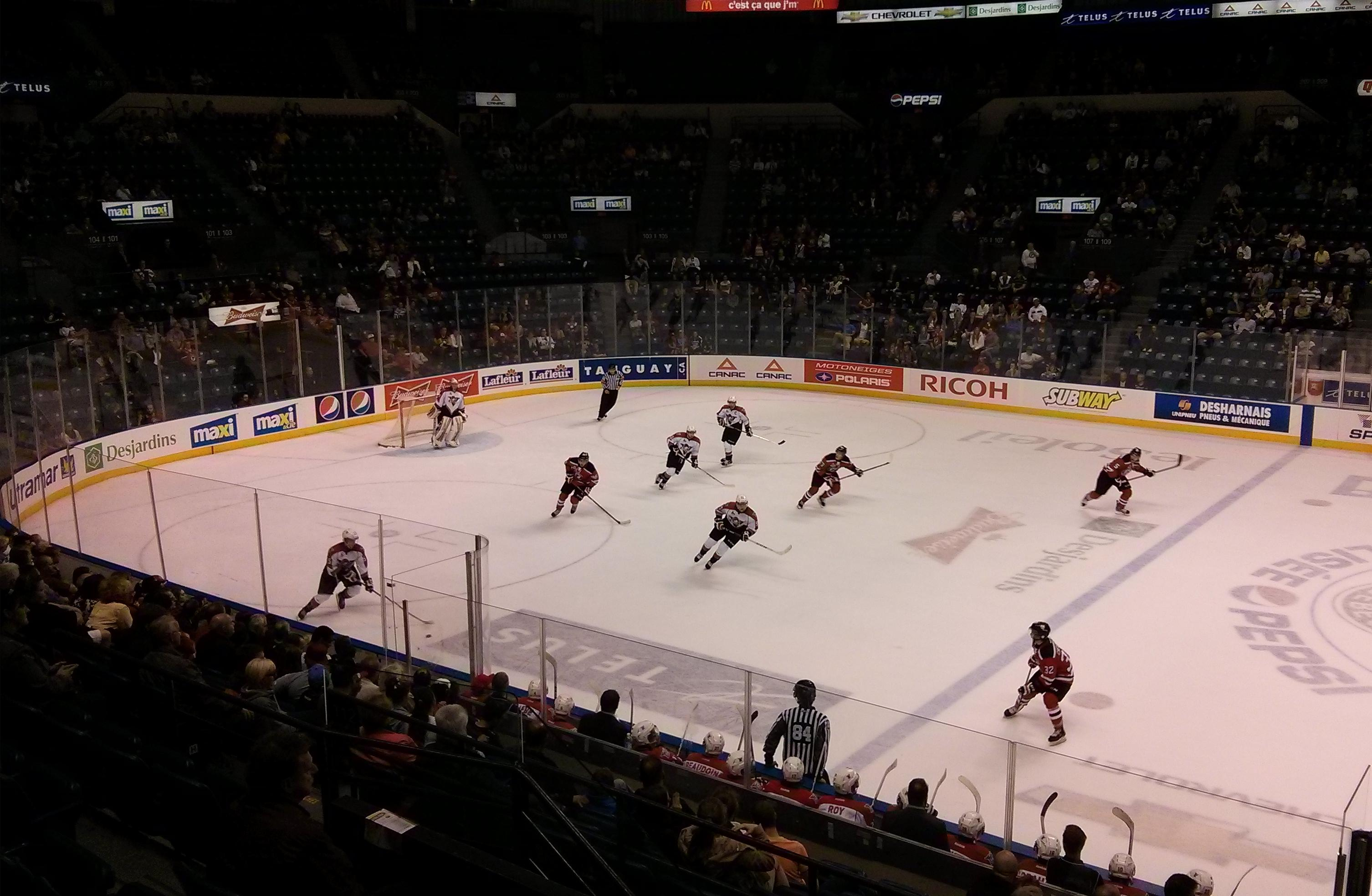
Interior of the Colisée during a hockey game

Preceded by first arena	Home of the Quebec Nordiques; 1972–1995	Succeeded by McNichols Sports Arena (as Colorado Avalanche)
