= Quebec International Pee-Wee Hockey Tournament =

Canadian minor ice hockey tournament

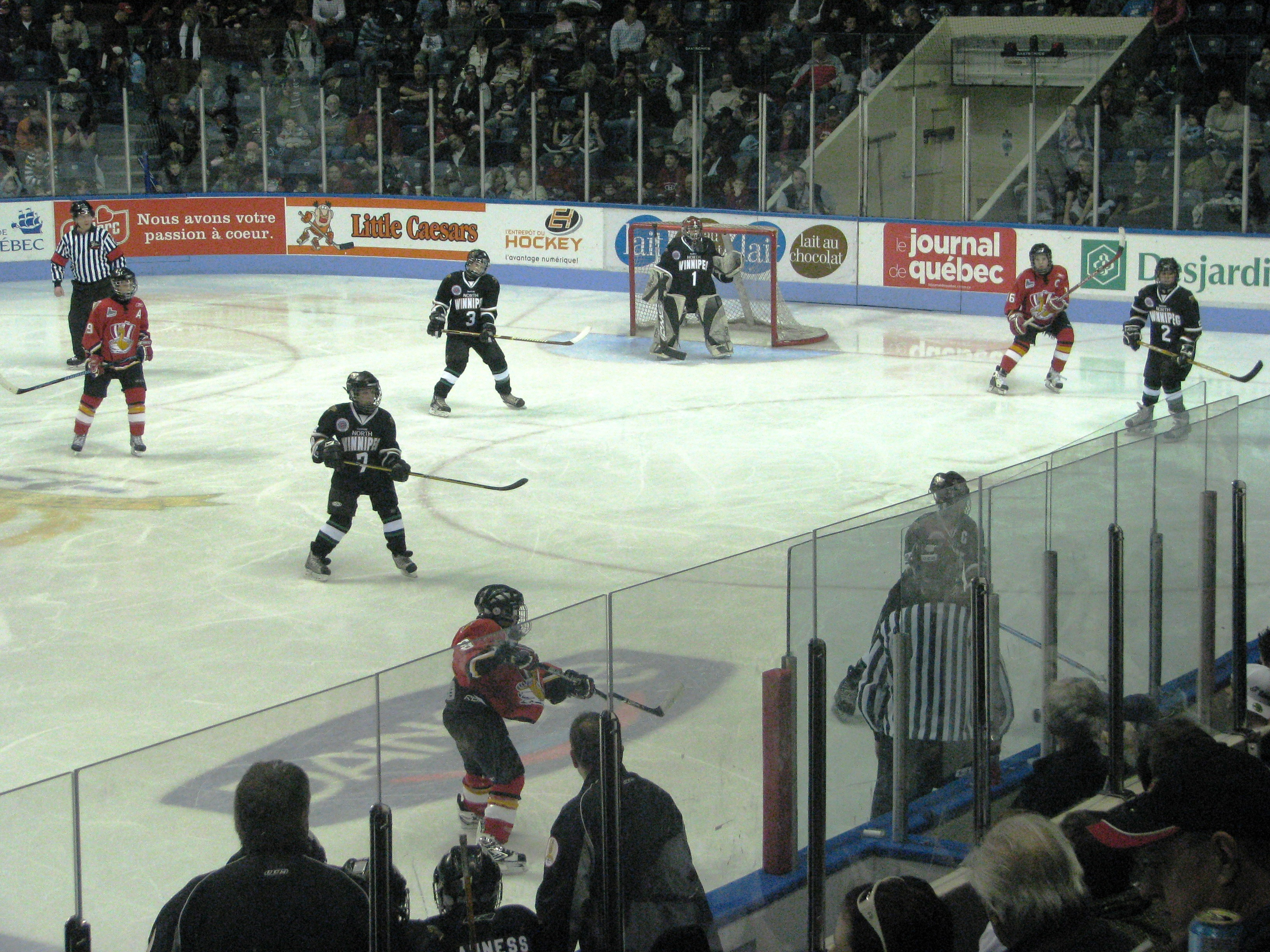
- 2009 tournament game action
- Genre: Minor ice hockey
- Frequency: Annually in February
- Venue: Centre Vidéotron
- Locations: Quebec City, Quebec
- Country: Canada
- Inaugurated: 1960
- Founders: Gérard Bolduc, Paul Dumont and others
- Website: tournoipee-wee.qc.ca/en/

The Quebec International Pee-Wee Hockey Tournament (French: Tournoi international de hockey pee-wee de Québec) is an annual minor ice hockey event in Quebec City. The tournament was founded in 1960 to coincide with the Quebec Winter Carnival, and give an opportunity for international competition to players less than 12 years old. The tournament raises funds for the local Patro Roc-Amadour foundation, and is operated mostly by volunteers, with a few staff. The event takes place each year in February at Centre Vidéotron, and previously spent 56 seasons at Quebec Coliseum. As of 2018, the event has showcased the talent of over 1,200 future professionals in the National Hockey League or the World Hockey Association.

== Tournament history ==
=== 1960 to 1974 ===
Gérard Bolduc was inspired to begin a youth ice hockey tournament after travelling with teams to tournaments in Goderich, Ontario and Duluth, Minnesota, and then founded the Quebec International Pee Wee Hockey Tournament in 1960 along with Paul Dumont, Jacques Boissinot, Pat Timmons, and Edmond de la Bruere. Bolduc served as the original president of the tournament, and remained in that role until 1974. The tournament became part of the annual Quebec Winter Carnival festivities in February.

The first tournament had 28 teams participate who were mostly local entries, but also included teams from Boston, Scarborough, and Newfoundland. The first game was played February 20, 1960, at Quebec Arena in Parc Victoria. Media in Quebec City were quick to cover the event due to its charitable nature, and it being the first time minor ice hockey was played in such a large arena. The event drew 12,500 spectators in its first seven days, and Bolduc negotiated to move the final game to Quebec Coliseum which drew 7,235 fans. The first grand champion of the tournament in 1960, was the Scarborough Lions team.

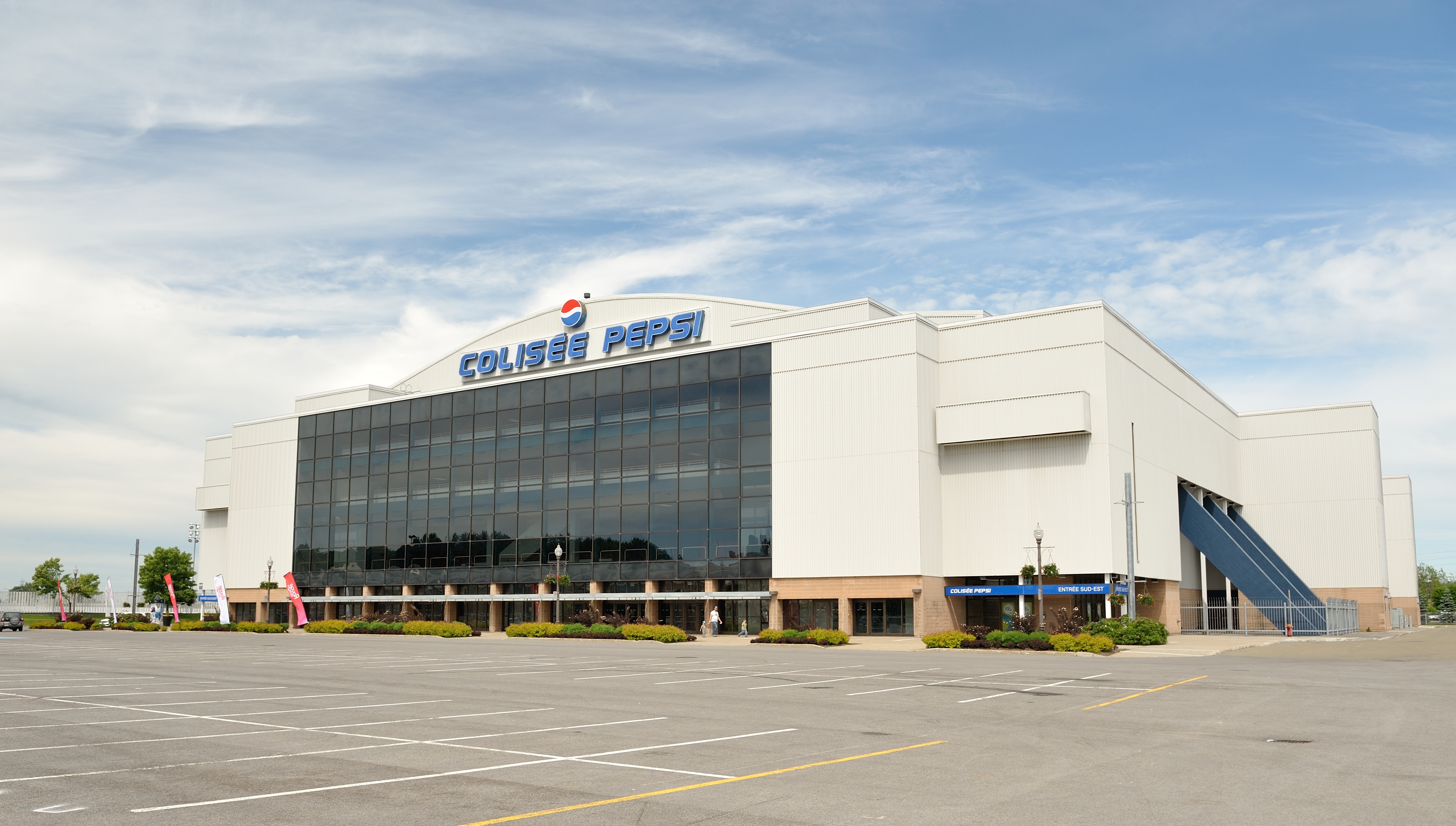
Quebec Coliseum was home to the tournament from 1960 to 2015.

From 1960 onward, every tournament was hosted at Quebec Coliseum. The tournament structure from 1960 to 1972 included four divisions (AA, A, B and C), and one overall grand champion. In 1962, the tournament grew to 54 teams, including entries from Ontario, Alberta, and the United States. Guy Lafleur played in three consecutive tournaments from 1962 to 1964, scoring a combined total of 64 goals. The addition of the Quebec Beavers team to the tournament grew the attendance, as they became a crowd favourite composed of local boys, with Martin Madden as the coach.

In 1965, the tournament inaugurated the Gérard Bolduc trophy, which was awarded to the winners of the AA division until 2001. In December 1967, the Quebec Amateur Hockey Association (QAHA) threatened not to sanction to 1968 event, due to the tournament organizers wanting to follow the Canadian Amateur Hockey Association age limits which were under 12 years of age as of May 31, 1967, whereas the QAHA wanted the tournament to follow its age limits of under 12 years of age as of December 31, 1967. For the tournament's 10th anniversary in 1969, Jacques Revelin authored the book The story of a fantastic tournament: which each year makes the Quebec Coliseum vibrate during the Winter Carnival. A team from Princeville, Quebec, won the grand championship in 1969, the first such winner from the host province.

The 1970s began with 102 teams playing at the tournament, including new entries from France and West Germany, and Bolduc announced that he was negotiating to get a team from the Soviet Union at the tournament by 1971. The 1971 event also had 102 teams, including six Canadian provinces, the Northwest Territories, the United States and Europe. In the 1974 tournament, a young Wayne Gretzky scored 26 goals playing for Brantford. After the year, Bolduc stepped down as the tournament president, having served in that role since 1960.

=== 1975 to 1999 ===
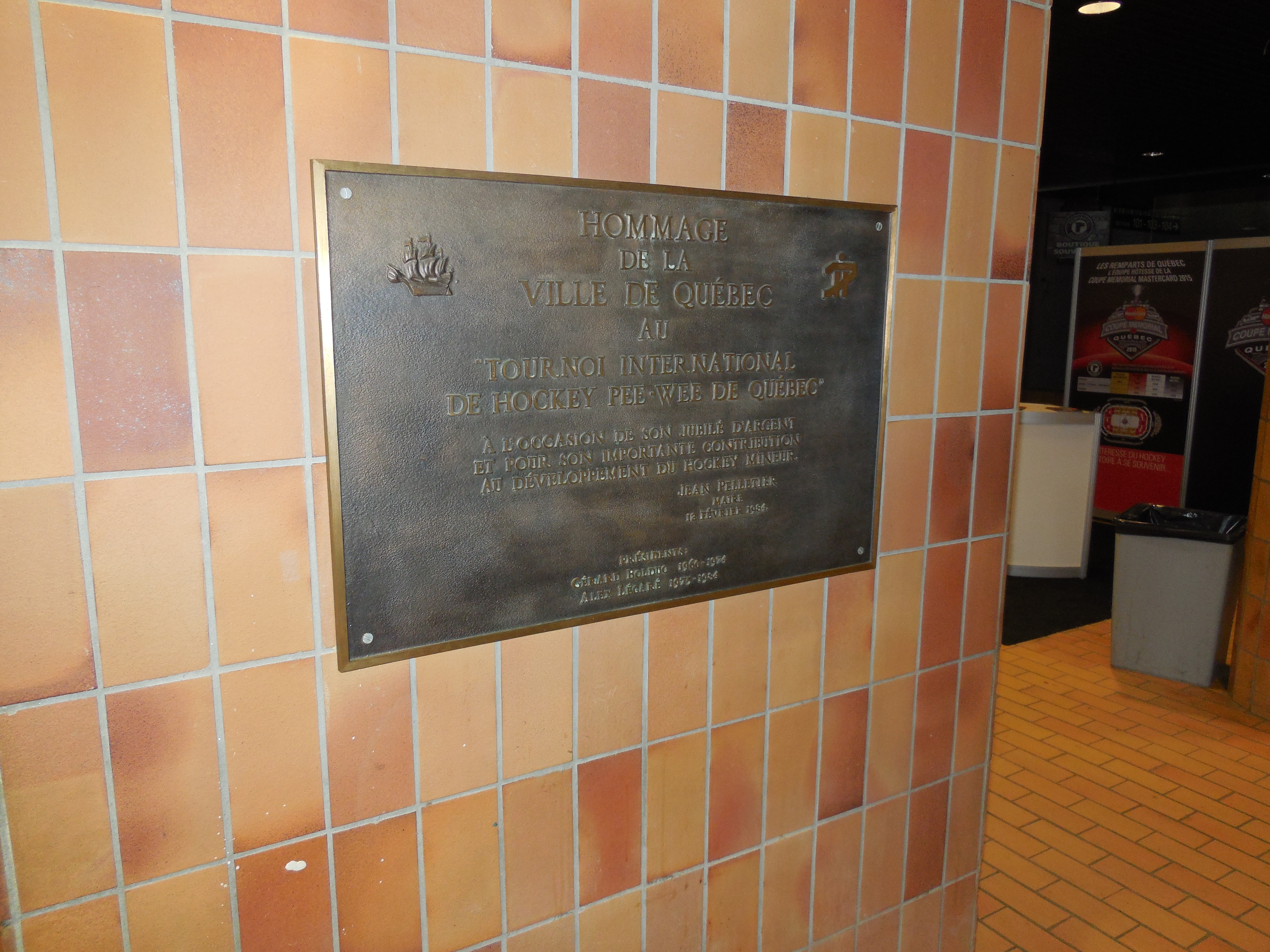
Quebec International Peewee Hockey Tournament 25th anniversary plaque at the Quebec Coliseum

In 1975, Alex Légaré took over as president of the tournament, and served in the role until the conclusion of the 1999 event. In 1976, the tournament began an International Cup division. In 1977, Légaré sought more autonomy for the tournament, and moved away from a direct partnership with the Quebec Winter Carnival. Légaré inaugurated the American Cup in 1980, and then the Quebec Cup in 1981, which were later combined into the International Cup.

The tournament celebrated its 25th anniversary in 1984, for which a plaque was unveiled in the Quebec Coliseum. That year, Manon Rhéaume became the first female goaltender to play for a boys' team in the tournament. Special considerations were made to allow her to play, which included updating tournament rules. The rule for age requirements was changed in 1986 to allow 13-year-olds, but it was soon reverted due to the greater size differences in the players. In 1989, teams from both the Soviet Union and Japan participated in the tournament. The final game in 1990 drew nearly 8,000 spectators.

In 1990, Tammy Shewchuk was the first non-goaltender female to play in the tournament. The 1990s saw stronger European teams from the Soviet Union and Czechoslovakia, which revived the tournament according to Quebec historian Yvon Huard, who had played in the event as a boy. By the 35th anniversary in 1994, the tournament had grown to 115 teams from 12 countries, and attracted close to 200,000 spectators. In 1999, a new attendance record was set with 211,178 spectators during the event.

=== 2000 to present ===
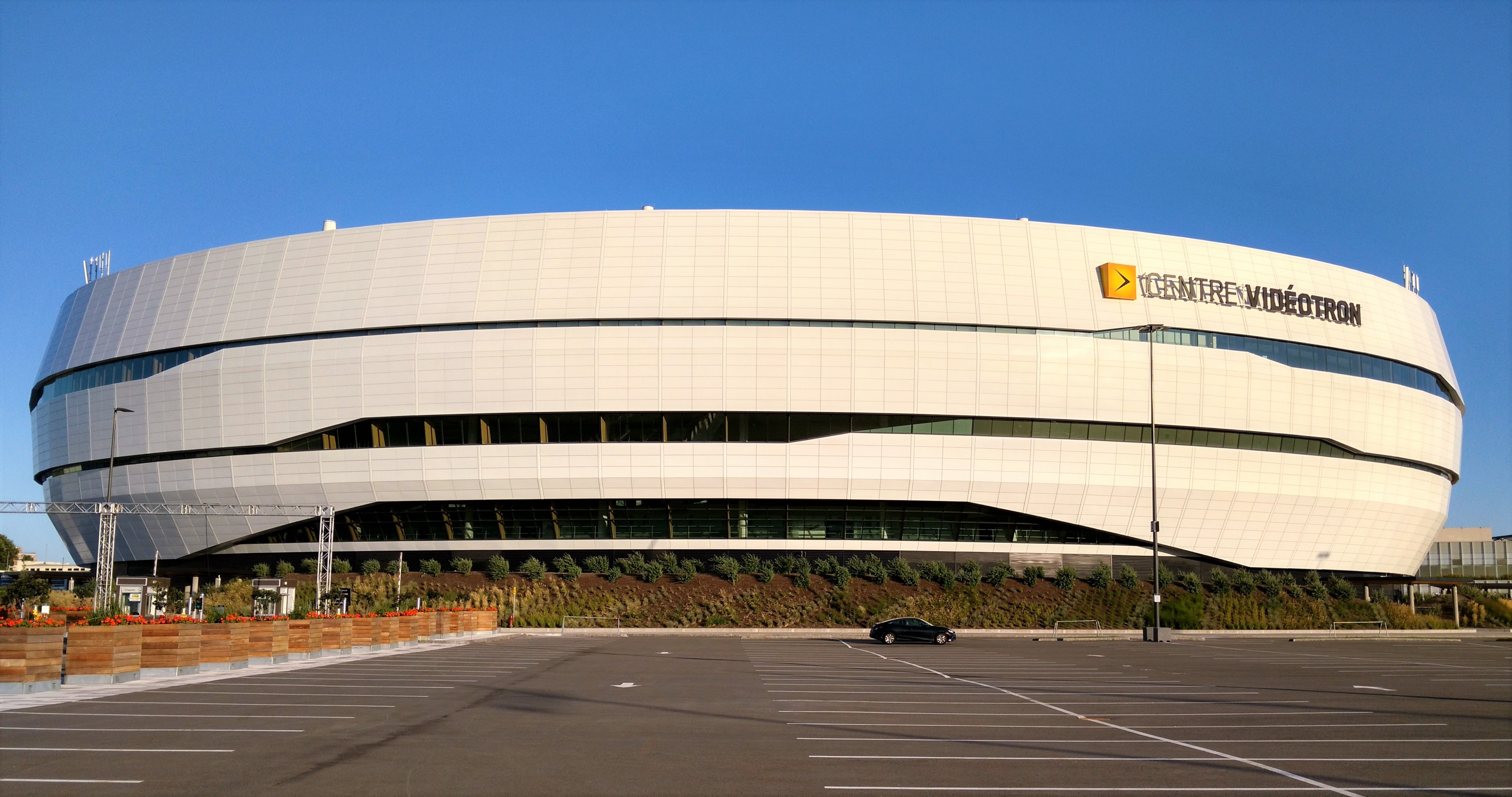
Centre Vidéotron has been home to the tournament since 2016.

The tournament dates were changed in 2001 to no longer coincide with the Quebec Winter Carnival, with the aim to increase attendance. The 50th anniversary in 2009 was celebrated with a legends game, that featured former participants who had retired from professional hockey. The 2010 tournament included the Ukrainian Druzhba-78 team, with American-born Auston Matthews playing. In 2011, the tournament welcomed Australia, its first team from Oceania and its fifth continent to be represented.

The 57th annual tournament in 2016 moved into its new home at Centre Vidéotron, after playing all previous tournaments at the Quebec Coliseum. The 2016 tournament saw the first team composed entirely of girls to participate, when a female all-star team from Québec was admitted to the AA division. The all-girls team was coached by Canadian Olympic hockey players Caroline Ouellette, Marie-Philip Poulin and Kim St-Pierre. Girls teams had played in exhibition games prior to 2016, but were not a part of the tournament itself. Registrations requests for the tournament by 2016 had grown to 300 teams, an increase of 20% from 2015. The greater amount of team come from the Province of Quebec, and due to the number of requests to play, approximately 20% of applications were declined. Also in 2016, teams from Russia were banned from the event due to "players and coaches being disruptive and disrespectful towards tournament volunteers" according to event staff. Russian teams were also omitted from the 2007 event for similar reasons.

The 2021 tournament was cancelled due to the COVID-19 pandemic in North America. The 2024 tournament included teams from 18 countries. In the 2025 tournament, a team from South Korea won the AA classification. Twelve teams of girls were accepted for the 2026 tournament. In response to U.S. national anthem protests at professional sporting events in Canada, tournament organizers urged that spectators not protest at an event for children, stating that "It's kind of like breaking their dreams" and that "We don't want them to go home with this memory".

== Community impact ==
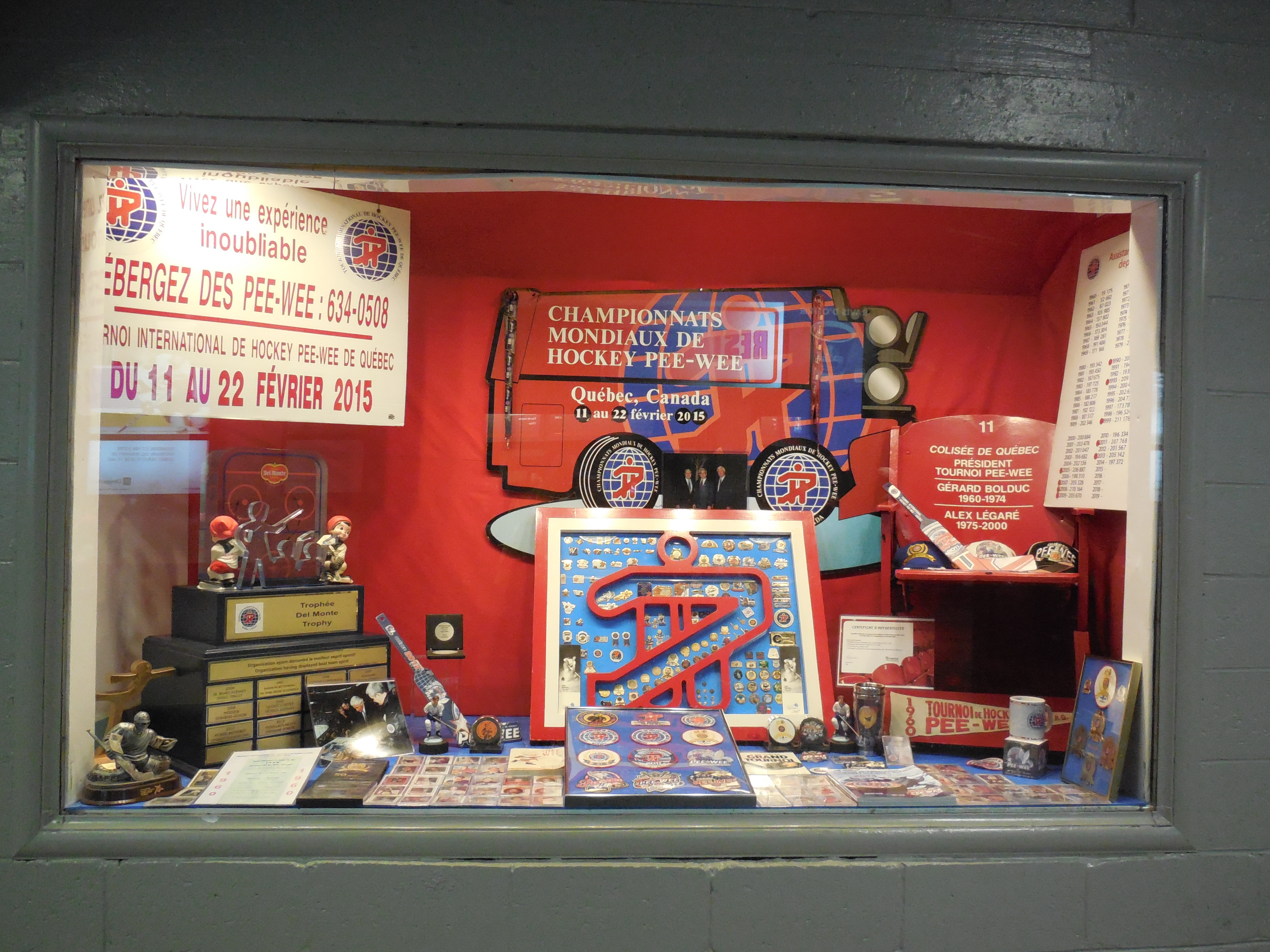
Commemorative tournament display case in the Quebec Coliseum

The Virtual Museum of Canada credits the tournament volunteers in cooperation with event staff as being a significant contributor to its worldwide reputation. The web site Canoe.com quotes event organizer Patrick Dom as stating that "the soul of this tournament is the volunteers, the sponsors and the crowd". Proceeds from the tournament have benefitted the community organization of Patro Roc-Amadour since 1960. In the first 50 years of the tournament, over $2,133,000 was donated to the foundation. Patro Roc-Amadour also houses the tournament's museum, including event pictures and its trophies. The economic contribution of the tournament to the community was estimated at $14 million in 2008, and $17 million by 2016.

== Player experience ==
Players have described the tournament as a "once-in-a-lifetime opportunity". For many, it is their first opportunity to play in an arena with crowds of 10,000 fans or more. For European players, it is sometimes their first trip to North America. The tournament has been colloquially referred to as the "Pee-Wee World Championships".

Tournament organizers seek a host family for visiting athletes to live with during the event, in an effort to offset the high cost of travel. Participation in the tournament for some teams includes extensive fundraising due to the costs associated with participation.

The tournament also provides an opportunity to be immersed in French Canadian culture and the culture of Quebec. The players are given tourist opportunities to see Old Quebec, the Citadelle of Quebec, and the Winter Carnival, and to participate in other winter sports. Players have the chance to meet youth from other parts of the world, and exchange and collect lapel pins.

== Notable participants ==
The tournament committee maintains a list on its web site of former participants who have subsequently played in the National Hockey League or the World Hockey Association, and as of 2018 it includes 1,246 people. From the 2017 list of the 100 Greatest NHL Players, twenty of those have played in the tournament.

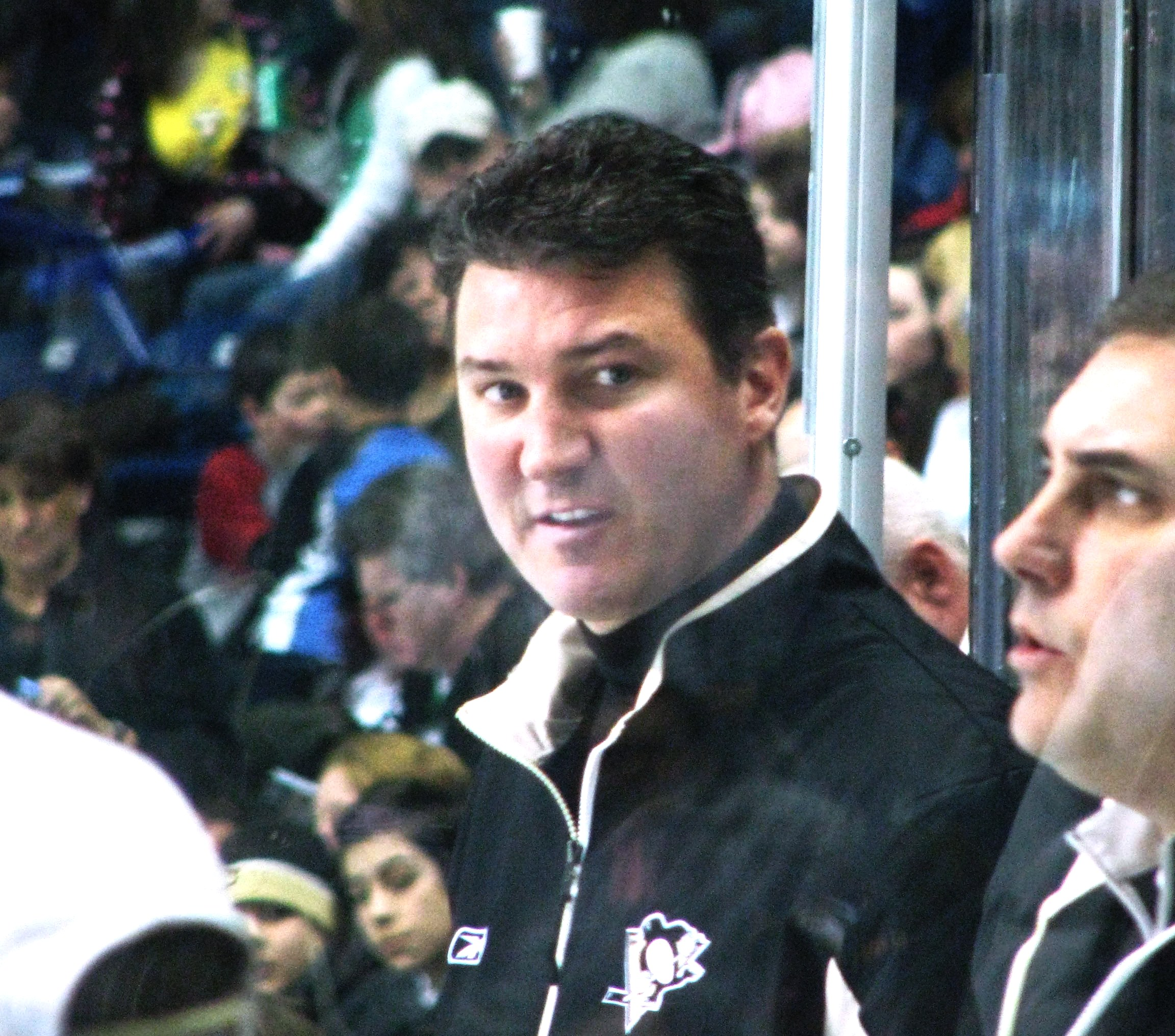
Mario Lemieux as the honorary coach of the Pittsburgh team at the 2009 tournament

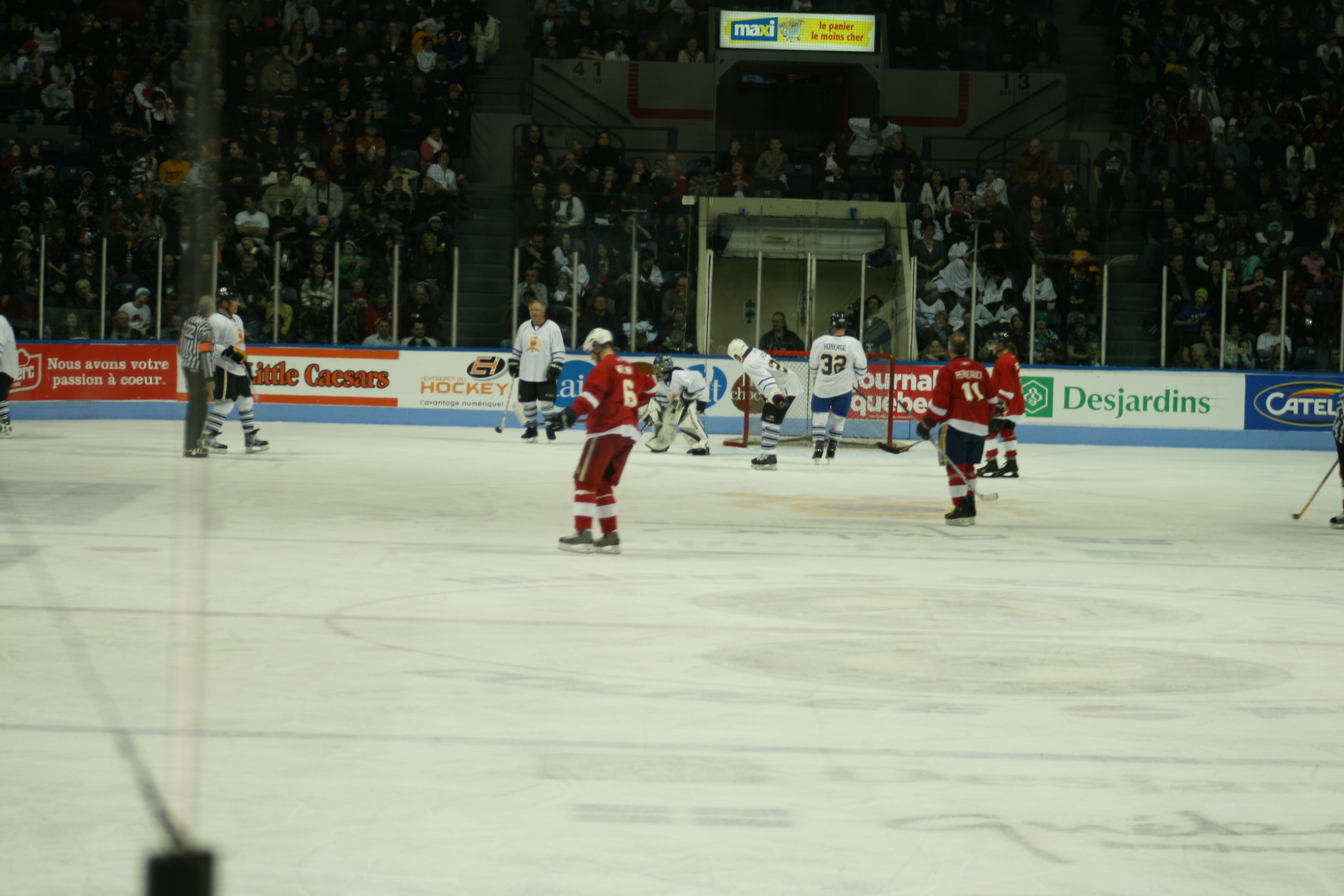
Legends game at the 2009 tournament

100 Greatest NHL Players – who played in the tournament

Player	Season(s)	Team(s)
Brad Park	1960	Scarborough Lions
Gilbert Perreault	1961, 1962, 1963	Victoriaville
Guy Lafleur	1962, 1963, 1964	Rockland / Thurso
Marcel Dionne	1962, 1963, 1964	Drummondville
Mike Bossy	1969	Montreal C.J.M.S.
Mike Gartner	1972	Christie
Denis Savard	1973, 1974	Verdun
Wayne Gretzky	1974	Brantford
Paul Coffey	1974	Christie
Adam Oates	1975	Kings
Ron Francis	1975, 1976	Sault Ste. Marie
Scott Stevens	1976	Kitchener
Pat LaFontaine	1977	Waterford
Steve Yzerman	1977	Nepean
Mario Lemieux	1977, 1978	Ville-Émard
Brett Hull	1977	Winnipeg Monarchs
Patrick Roy	1977, 1978	Québec Centre
Mike Modano	1982	Detroit Little Caesars
Brendan Shanahan	1982	Mississauga Reps
Eric Lindros	1985	Toronto Marlboros
