= Gilles Courteau =

Canadian ice hockey administrator (born 1957)

- Born: October 7, 1957 (age 68); Trois-Rivières, Quebec, Canada
- Occupation: Quebec Major Junior Hockey League president
- Years active: 1986 to 2023
- Awards: Hockey Québec Hall of Fame

Gilles Courteau (born October 7, 1957) is a Canadian former ice hockey administrator. He served as president of the Quebec Major Junior Hockey League (QMJHL) from 1986 to 2023, and was a vice-president of the Canadian Hockey League. During his tenure as president, the QMJHL expanded from 10 teams in Quebec only, to 18 teams including Atlantic Canada. He implemented English as the language of instruction, and sought for the league to provide education and player assistance. He previously worked for the Trois-Rivières Draveurs, the Quebec Remparts, the Quebec Nordiques, and was inducted into the Hockey Québec Hall of Fame in 2016.

== Early hockey career ==
Courteau was born on October 7, 1957, in Trois-Rivières, Quebec. He began his career in hockey as a statistician for the Trois-Rivières Draveurs from 1975 to 1977. He worked with head coach Michel Bergeron for two seasons. Team owner Sylvain Cinq-Mars recommended Courteau apply for a similar position with the league after league president Paul Dumont opened an administration office in the Colisée de Québec. Courteau worked as a general administrator for the QMJHL from 1977 to 1980. He later became general manager of the Quebec Remparts from 1980 to 1985 after the departure of Martin Madden. Courteau also served as a public relations agent for the Quebec Nordiques from 1983 to 1985. When the original Quebec Remparts relocated in 1985, Courteau returned to working for the QMJHL as the administrative director.

== QMJHL president ==
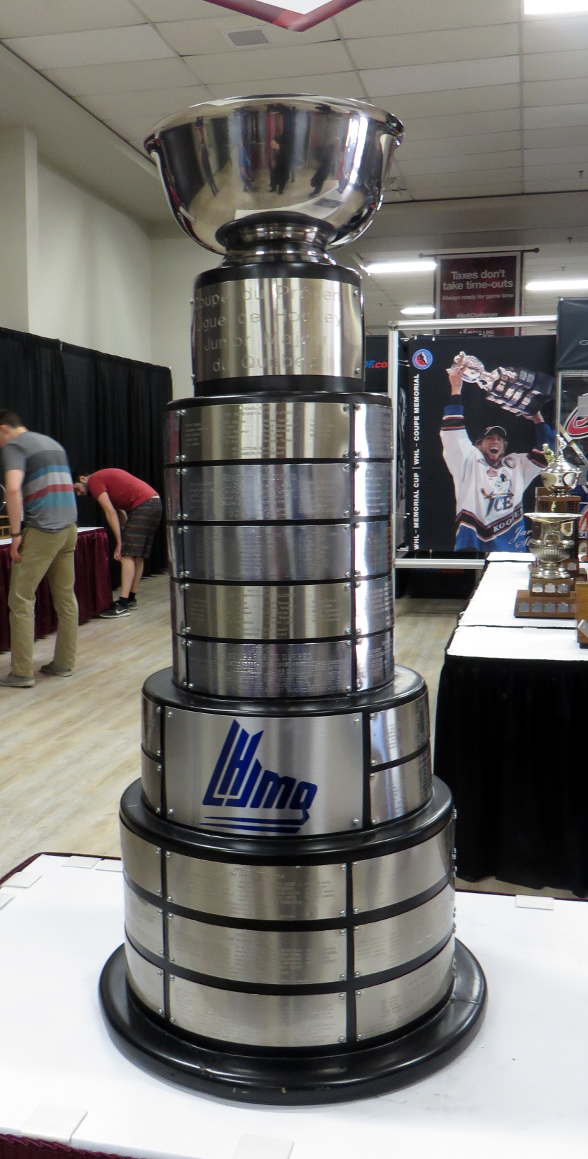
The President's Cup became the Gilles-Courteau Trophy in 2023, symbolic of the playoffs championship.

Courteau became president of the Quebec Major Junior Hockey League (QMJHL) on February 13, 1986. He was appointed interim president upon the resignation of Guy Morissette, and remained as the tenth and longest-serving league president. He took on the added role of QMJHL commissioner in September 2001, is also a vice-president of the Canadian Hockey League (CHL), and represents the CHL on the junior council of Hockey Canada.

When Courteau took over in the 1985–86 QMJHL season, the league had ten teams and an office staff of three full-time employees; as of the 2014–15 QMJHL season, the league had eighteen teams and a staff of twenty full-time employees. He led expansion into Atlantic Canada, starting with Halifax in the 1994–95 QMJHL season, which Courteau says is one of his biggest accomplishments as president. The decision was successful in allowing new owners and respected businessmen to join the league, raise expectations and the league profile, and increase the average worth of each franchise to $4.5 million in 2015. The growth allowed Courteau to negotiate a 12-year extension for QMJHL television rights with TVA Sports and Sportsnet networks, and established revenue sharing to help smaller market teams.

In the early 2000s, Courteau directed the league's coaches to speak English instead of French during practice, in locker rooms, and during games, in response to the National Hockey League's concern that players from Quebec did not speak the language well enough to play at professional levels. He was criticized in Quebec's French language media, but defended his decision as it prepared athletes for professional leagues that only use English. He also implemented French language courses for athletes with English as a first language, to help adapt to being billeted in French and attending local schools.

In response to the class action lawsuit against the CHL regarding the status of its players with respect to the minimum wage in Canada, Courteau said that its players are not employees, but are student athletes. He successfully lobbied for amendments to labour standards in Nova Scotia, New Brunswick, and Prince Edward Island, and as of June 2018 is negotiating with the Quebec government. Courteau said that if players were paid a weekly salary, they would be less likely to continue schooling. He says the league's priority is to oversee players, ensure they have housing, food, education, hockey equipment, and receive a weekly stipend. He also stated that the league spends $75,000 per player each year including tuition and tutoring, and is more akin to a scholarship than a salary. He introduced a player assistance program in 2012 to help with on-ice and off-ice issues for players, and wants to maintain the trust of players and parents, as part of his own extended family.

Courteau has maintained the status quo on not releasing numbers of concussions in the QMJHL, due to confidentiality of medical records, but has stated that the CHL may adopt a policy on the disclosure of statistics in the future. He also stated that the CHL has considered a possible renaming of the QMJHL, but that there are issues regarding branding and broadcasting.

In December 2022, Courteau, announced that he will retire from the QMJHL in May 2024. He instead resigned sooner, effective March 5, 2023. His resignation came during the Government of Quebec inquiry into allegations of sexual misconduct committed during hazing rituals dating back to 1975 in the QMJHL. He was succeeded as QMJHL commissioner by Mario Cecchini.

== Honours and awards ==
Courteau received a commendation from Minister of Veterans Affairs of Canada for his role in establishing a veterans' week throughout the QMJHL in 2010. Courteau was inducted into the Hockey Québec Hall of Fame on June 11, 2016.

After retiring as commissioner in 2023, the QMJHL renamed its trophy for the playoffs championship to be the Gilles-Courteau Trophy.

== Personal life ==
Courteau coached baseball in Trois-Rivières in 1975. He worked at the CIP pulp and paper mill in Trois-Rivières, before relocating to Quebec City to follow a hockey career. After the QMJHL relocated to Boucherville, Courteau became a resident of Varennes, Quebec.
