= Gérard Bolduc =

Canadian ice hockey administrator (1906–1993)

- Born: August 3, 1906; Montmagny, Quebec, Canada
- Died: March 8, 1993 (aged 86); Saint-Romuald, Quebec, Canada
- Occupation: Civil servant
- Known for: Quebec International Pee-Wee Hockey Tournament
- Awards: Quebec Sports Hall of Fame

Gérard Bolduc (August 3, 1906 – March 8, 1993) was a Canadian ice hockey administrator. He co-founded the Quebec International Pee-Wee Hockey Tournament in 1960, served as president of the tournament for 15 years, and sought to bring international youth teams to Quebec City to play. He was also involved with the Quebec Amateur Hockey Association and the Quebec Remparts, and was posthumously inducted into the Quebec Sports Hall of Fame.

== Early life ==
Gérard Bolduc was born on August 3, 1906, in Montmagny, Quebec, to parents Joseph Bolduc and Diana St-Pierre. As a youth, he won medals competing in skiing and snowshoeing. He later worked as a civil servant in the Government of Quebec overseeing hunting and fishing activities, and also volunteered his time in recreation at the parish of Saints-Martyrs in Quebec City.

== Hockey career ==
Bolduc was an officer in the Quebec Amateur Hockey Association during the 1950s, and was chairman of the Quebec District Committee which oversaw the Quebec Hockey School that trained players and referees. He toured with youth teams to tournaments in Goderich, Ontario and Duluth, Minnesota, and proposed having a similar event in Quebec City to coincide with the annual Quebec Winter Carnival.

Bolduc collaborated with Paul Dumont, Jacques Boissinot, Pat Timmons, and Edmond de la Bruere, to establish the first Quebec International Pee-Wee Hockey Tournament, which began on February 20, 1960, at Quebec Arena at Victoria Park. Bolduc successfully recruited 28 teams to the first tournament, which drew nearly 20,000 spectators. The event proved so popular, that he switched games later in the week to the Quebec Coliseum, to accommodate the larger crowds. He also set up a recurring donation of each year's proceeds from the tournament to the Patro Roc-Amadour parish.

Bolduc served as president of the tournament from 1960 to 1974. He aspired to have teams from around the world at the tournament, and by the 12th event he had recruited teams from the United States, France, West Germany, and the Soviet Union. The tournament operated within the festivities of the Quebec Winter Carnival during this time, but later became more autonomous from it in 1977, after Bolduc retired. His contributions to the tournament were chronicled in the book The story of a fantastic tournament: which each year makes the Quebec Coliseum vibrate during the Winter Carnival by Jacques Revelin, published in 1969.

In 1969, Bolduc was one of the founders of the Quebec Remparts.

== Later life and legacy ==
Bolduc died on March 8, 1993, in Saint-Romuald, Quebec. He frequently wore a Tyrolean hat. He is the namesake of the Gérard Bolduc trophy, awarded to the winning team of the pee-wee tournament's AA division from 1965 to 2001. He was named Man of the Year in 1973 by the Molson Brewery, and was honoured in the Circle of Molson Builders. He was posthumously inducted into the Quebec Sports Hall of Fame in 1994.
