= Mario Cecchini (businessman) =

Canadian media and sports executive

- Occupation(s): Media executive, sports executive
- Known for: President of Montreal Alouettes; Commissioner of Quebec Major Junior Hockey League

Mario Cecchini is a Canadian media and sports executive. He has served as commissioner of the Quebec Maritimes Junior Hockey League since 2023, and previously was president of the Montreal Alouettes of the Canadian Football League. He has worked for multiple media companies, including 15 years for Telemedia Radio.

== Media ==
Cecchini had a 15-year career with Telemedia Radio, where he was of vice president of sales and marketing and executive vice-president in charge of the company's Ontario stations. In 2002, he became the vice president of sales for the TQS Television Network. In 2003, he was appointed president and chief operating officer of Zoom Media. He then served as a vice-president of Corus Québec. In 2011 he became the senior vice-president, sales and marketing at Astral Radio. In 2013, Cecchini joined Corus Entertainment as president of Corus Media Quebec. In this role, he oversaw the company's radio and television stations in Eastern Ontario as well as French-language cable television assets and Ottawa radio stations acquired from Bell/Astral. In 2018 he started his own consulting firm.

== Canadian football ==
In 2020, Cecchini was named president of the Montreal Alouettes of the Canadian Football League. Under Cecchini's leadership, the Alouettes saw increased corporate sponsorship and average attendance rose from 13,063 in 2021 to 17,683 in 2022. In December 2022, the estate of Sid Spiegel, which had controlling interest in the team, informed Cecchini that his contract would not be renewed. On February 14, 2023, the Canadian Football League took control of the Alouettes and Cecchini returned to the team as interim president. The team was sold to Pierre Karl Péladeau on March 10, 2023, and Cecchini stepped down as president on April 6, 2023.

== Junior ice hockey ==
On March 7, 2023, Cecchini was named commissioner of the Quebec Major Junior Hockey League. He succeeded 37-year commissioner Gilles Courteau who resigned amid political scrutiny over hazing in hockey. Cecchini took office on May 8, 2023. In December 2023, the QMJHL changed its name to the Quebec Maritimes Junior Hockey League.
