= Ken Appleby =

Canadian ice hockey player (born 1995)

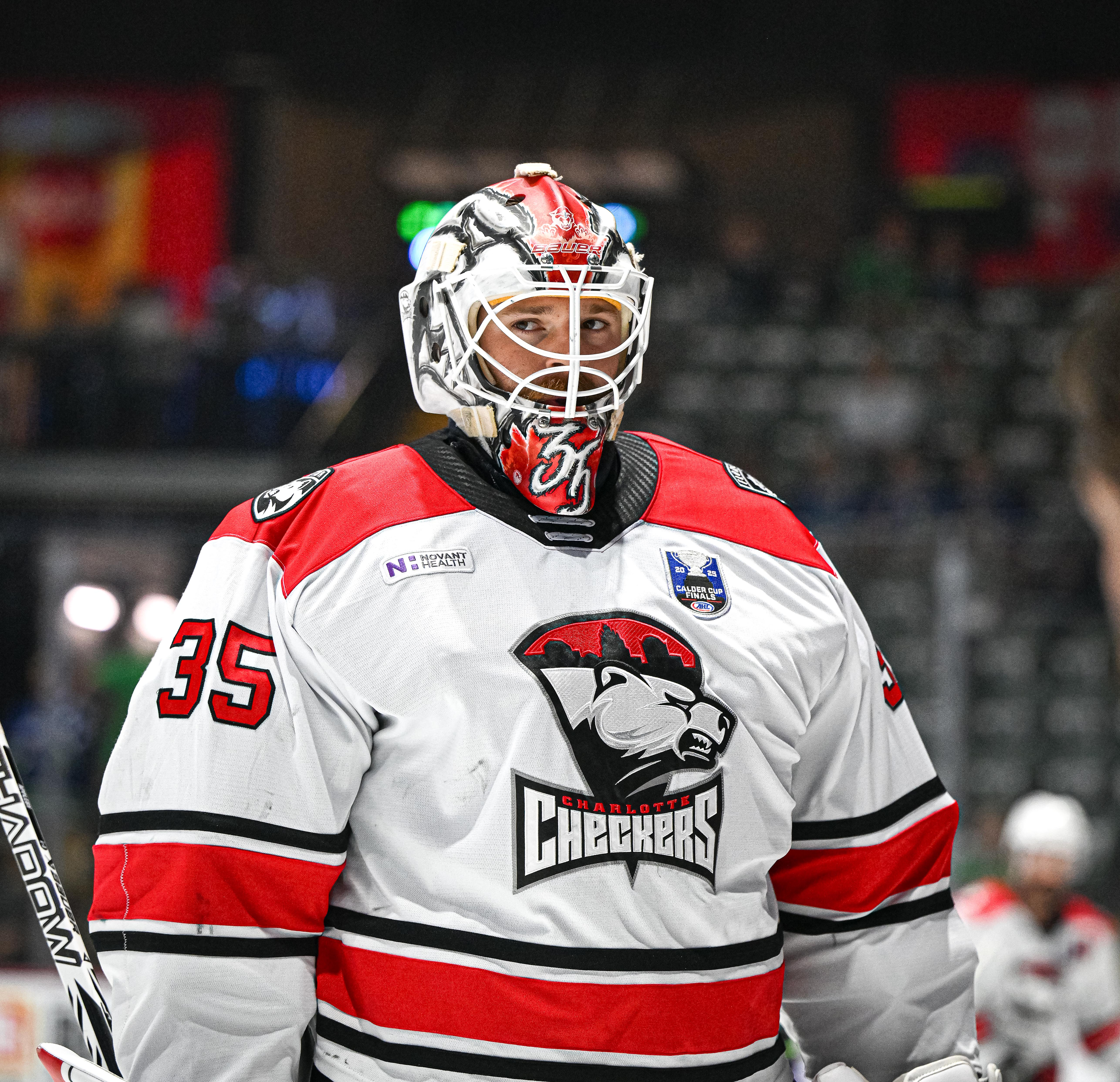
- Appleby with the Charlotte Checkers in the 2025 Calder Cup Finals
- Born: April 10, 1995 (age 31) North Bay, Ontario, Canada
- Height: 6 ft 5 in (196 cm)
- Weight: 224 lb (102 kg; 16 st 0 lb)
- Position: Goaltender
- Catches: Left
- AHL team Former teams: Toronto Marlies; New Jersey Devils; New York Islanders
- NHL draft: Undrafted
- Playing career: 2015–present

Ken Appleby (born April 10, 1995) is a Canadian professional ice hockey goaltender for the Toronto Marlies in the American Hockey League (AHL). He has previously played in the National Hockey League (NHL) with the New Jersey Devils and New York Islanders.

== Playing career ==
On October 5, 2015, Appleby signed a three-year entry-level contract with the New Jersey Devils of the National Hockey League (NHL). On January 20, 2018, Appleby made his NHL debut in a 3–1 loss to the Philadelphia Flyers, saving 24 shots when he replaced Keith Kinkaid. Appleby was sent back down to the AHL on February 4, 2018.

Despite making his NHL debut the final season of his entry-level deal, Appleby as an impending restricted free agent was not tendered a qualifying offer by the New Jersey Devils on June 25, 2018. As a free agent, Appleby secured a one-year AHL contract with the Manitoba Moose, affiliate to the Winnipeg Jets, on July 3, 2018.

During the 2018–19 season, having split time between the Moose and ECHL affiliate, the Jacksonville Icemen, before Appleby was signed to add depth and insurance to the Winnipeg Jets, agreeing to a one-year, two-way contract for the remainder of the season on February 25, 2019. Appleby was assigned to continue in the ECHL with the Icemen.

On June 25, 2019, at the conclusion of his contract with the Jets, Appleby was not tendered a qualifying offer, releasing him as a free agent. On July 9, 2019, Appleby agreed to continue in the AHL, signing a one-year contract with the Milwaukee Admirals, affiliate to the Nashville Predators.

On February 5, 2021, Appleby signed with the Bridgeport Sound Tigers of the AHL, adding depth for the 2020–21 season. Approaching the final stages of the regular season, Appleby was signed by parent affiliate, the New York Islanders, to a two-year, two-way contract on April 9, 2021.

As a free agent from the Islanders organization, Appleby was signed to a one-year AHL contract with the Charlotte Checkers, affiliate to the Florida Panthers, on July 2, 2024.

As a free agent on July 7, 2025 he signed a one-year AHL contract with the Toronto Marlies, affiliate of the Toronto Maple Leafs.

== Career statistics ==
			Regular season									Playoffs
Season	Team	League	GP	W	L	T/OT	MIN	GA	SO	GAA	SV%	GP	W	L	MIN	GA	SO	GAA	SV%
2011–12	Kirkland Lake Blue Devils	NOJHL	14	2	11	1	811	66	1	4.88	—	—	—	—	—	—	—	—	—
2012–13	Oshawa Generals	OHL	18	6	4	2	756	34	0	2.70	.886	—	—	—	—	—	—	—	—
2013–14	Oshawa Generals	OHL	24	11	7	3	1234	51	3	2.48	.920	1	0	1	59	3	0	3.06	.893
2014–15	Oshawa Generals	OHL	50	38	7	4	2935	102	6	2.08	.924	21	16	5	1259	47	2	2.24	.922
2015–16	Adirondack Thunder	ECHL	29	17	9	2	1712	64	3	2.24	.924	12	7	4	754	29	1	2.31	.920
2015–16	Albany Devils	AHL	8	3	3	2	486	21	1	2.59	.904	—	—	—	—	—	—	—	—
2016–17	Albany Devils	AHL	32	17	14	1	1917	84	0	2.63	.903	1	0	0	33	2	0	3.61	.800
2016–17	Adirondack Thunder	ECHL	6	4	1	1	363	12	1	1.98	.915	—	—	—	—	—	—	—	—
2017–18	Binghamton Devils	AHL	26	10	13	2	1500	69	2	2.76	.901	—	—	—	—	—	—	—	—
2017–18	New Jersey Devils	NHL	3	0	1	0	124	3	0	1.45	.945	—	—	—	—	—	—	—	—
2017–18	Adirondack Thunder	ECHL	2	1	1	0	119	4	0	2.03	.922	—	—	—	—	—	—	—	—
2018–19	Manitoba Moose	AHL	10	2	6	0	520	34	1	3.92	.884	—	—	—	—	—	—	—	—
2018–19	Jacksonville Icemen	ECHL	15	7	7	1	859	35	1	2.45	.923	4	0	3	217	10	0	2.76	.905
2019–20	Florida Everblades	ECHL	42	27	8	5	2382	95	3	2.39	.913	—	—	—	—	—	—	—	—
2020–21	Bridgeport Sound Tigers	AHL	7	4	3	0	421	16	1	2.28	.914	—	—	—	—	—	—	—	—
2021–22	Bridgeport Islanders	AHL	9	1	4	3	505	21	1	2.49	.928	—	—	—	—	—	—	—	—
2021–22	Worcester Railers	ECHL	27	14	11	2	1602	77	1	2.88	.918	—	—	—	—	—	—	—	—
2022–23	Worcester Railers	ECHL	30	13	13	1	1692	85	0	3.01	.907	—	—	—	—	—	—	—	—
2022–23	Bridgeport Islanders	AHL	5	0	3	2	253	19	0	4.50	.861	—	—	—	—	—	—	—	—
2023–24	Bridgeport Islanders	AHL	22	10	10	1	1180	56	1	2.85	.901	—	—	—	—	—	—	—	—
2023–24	New York Islanders	NHL	1	0	0	0	20	2	0	6.00	.750	—	—	—	—	—	—	—	—
2023–24	Worcester Railers	ECHL	2	1	1	0	120	6	0	3.01	.914	—	—	—	—	—	—	—	—
2024–25	Charlotte Checkers	AHL	24	15	8	1	1440	47	6	1.96	.910	—	—	—	—	—	—	—	—
2025–26	Cincinnati Cyclones	ECHL	42	23	16	1	2425	118	1	2.92	.906	—	—	—	—	—	—	—	—
2025–26	Toronto Marlies	AHL	2	1	1	0	117	5	0	2.55	.909	—	—	—	—	—	—	—	—
NHL totals			4	0	1	0	144	5	0	2.08	.921	—	—	—	—	—	—	—	—

== Awards and honours ==
Award	Year
NOJHL
Second All-Star Team	2012
OHL
Second All-Rookie Team	2015
Dave Pinkney Trophy	2015
Memorial Cup All-Star Team	2015
Memorial Cup Most Outstanding Player	2015
