= Quebec Remparts =

Junior ice hockey team in Quebec City, Quebec

Quebec Remparts Remparts de Québec
- City: Quebec City, Quebec
- League: Quebec Maritimes Junior Hockey League
- Conference: Eastern
- Division: East
- Founded: 1969 (original); 1997 (revived)
- Home arena: Centre Vidéotron
- Colours: Red, white, black
- General manager: Simon Gagné
- Head coach: Éric Veilleux
- Website: http://www.remparts.ca/

Franchise history
- 1990–1997: Beauport Harfangs
- 1997–present: Quebec Remparts

Previous franchise history
- 1969–1985: Quebec Remparts
- 1988–1991: Longueuil Collège Français
- 1991–1994: Verdun Collège Français

Championships
- Playoff championships: Memorial Cup champions 1971, 2006, 2023; QMJHL champions 1970, 1971, 1973, 1974, 1976, 2023

Current uniform

The Quebec Remparts (French: Remparts de Québec) are a Canadian junior ice hockey based in Quebec City, Quebec. The team plays in the Quebec Maritimes Junior Hockey League (QMJHL), and is named after the Ramparts of Quebec City (French: Remparts de Québec). There have been two franchises named the Quebec Remparts. The first edition played from 1969 to 1985; the current franchise has played since 1997. The current team plays at Centre Vidéotron.

== Original Remparts ==
The original Quebec Remparts team was founded in 1969 by a group of investors who purchased the assets of the junior Quebec Aces team. Some of the new owners included Paul Dumont, and Gérard Bolduc. The Remparts took up residence in the same arena as the Aces in the Colisée de Québec. The Remparts were finalists for the George Richardson Memorial Trophy in 1969–70, and eastern Canadian champions in 1970–71. It was this team, which featured future Hockey Hall of Famer Guy Lafleur, that won a Memorial Cup championship in 1971. The team also won the President's Cup five times. Gilles Courteau was the general manager of the Remparts from 1980 to 1985.

After the 1984–85 season, the team went into dormancy for three seasons before being resurrected. After returning to play, then-sponsored by "Le Collège Français", the team moved to Longueuil to become the Longueuil Collège Français. The team played for three seasons before moving to Verdun in 1991 to become the Verdun Collège Français. The franchise ceased operations in 1994.

== Revived Remparts ==
The current Remparts franchise was granted for the 1990–91 season and was known as the Beauport Harfangs, a suburb in the Quebec City metropolitan area. In 1997 the team moved to Quebec City, playing two seasons at PEPS on the campus of Laval University between 1997 and 1999. In 1999 the team moved into the Colisée de Québec.

On May 28, 2006, the Remparts won the Memorial Cup, beating the Moncton Wildcats 6–2 in the finals. Then-head coach Patrick Roy became the seventh coach to win the Cup in his first year as head coach, and the first to do so since Claude Julien of the Hull Olympiques in 1997. It was also the first time in Memorial Cup history that the finals involved two teams from the QMJHL. Quebec also won the Cup without winning a League championship and without hosting the event, another first in Memorial Cup history.

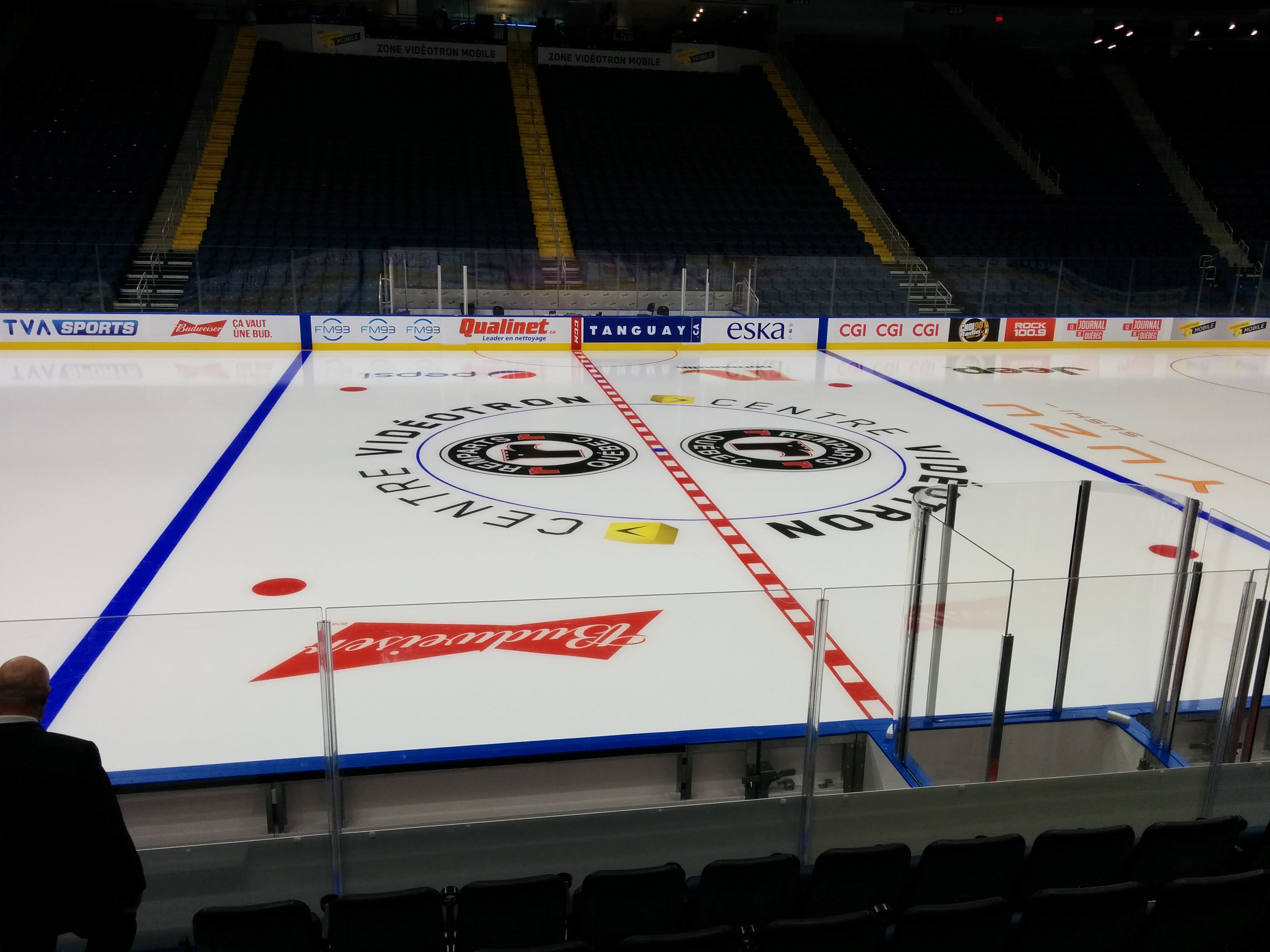
Remparts centre ice at Centre Vidéotron

On November 27, 2014, the Remparts were sold to Quebecor for an estimated price between $20 million and $25 million. The Remparts were chosen to be the host of the 2015 Memorial Cup. They defeated the Rimouski Océanic in tie-breaker 5-2, but were eliminated by the Kelowna Rockets in the semi-finals 9-3. The team moved to Centre Vidéotron on September 12, 2015.

On June 4, 2023, the Remparts won the Memorial Cup, beating the Seattle Thunderbirds 5–0 in the championship game; head coach Patrick Roy had previously announced that this was his last year as head coach, thus completing the book end to his first year Cup win.

== NHL alumni ==
Original Remparts

Michel Goulet, and Guy Lafleur have been inducted into the Hockey Hall of Fame.

- Pierre Aubry
- Rick Bowness
- Stéphane Brochu
- Mario Brunetta
- Nelson Burton
- Guy Chouinard
- Réal Cloutier
- Alain Côté
- Sylvain Côté
- André Doré
- Gaétan Duchesne
- Peter Folco
- Eddy Godin
- Michel Goulet
- Richard Grenier
- Val James
- Michel Lachance
- Pierre Lacroix
- Guy Lafleur
- Jean-Marc Lanthier
- Kevin Lowe
- Gilles Lupien
- Mario Marois
- Pat Mayer
- Gilles Meloche
- Rich Nantais
- Paul Pageau
- Dave Pichette
- Jacques Richard
- Mario Roberge
- Serge Roberge
- Normand Rochefort
- Roberto Romano
- André Savard
- Jean Savard
- Martin Simard
- Gaston Therrien
- Vincent Tremblay

Modern Remparts

- Maxim Balmochnykh
- Zachary Bolduc
- Eric Chouinard
- Louis Crevier
- Jean-Philippe Côté
- Cédrick Desjardins
- Louis Domingue
- Anthony Duclair
- Gordie Dwyer
- Adam Erne
- Simon Gagné
- Nathan Gaucher
- Alexandre Grenier
- Martin Grenier
- Mikhail Grigorenko
- Josh Hennessy
- Aaron Johnson
- Juraj Kolnik
- Nikita Kucherov
- Kristian Kudroc
- Philipp Kurashev
- Guillaume Lefebvre
- James Malatesta
- Jonathan Marchessault
- Maxime Ouellet
- Alexander Radulov
- Mike Ribeiro
- Kirill Safronov
- Logan Shaw
- Timofei Shishkanov
- Jordan Smotherman
- Antoine Vermette
- Marc-Édouard Vlasic

== Playoffs ==
Season	1st round	2nd round	3rd round	Finals
1997–98	W, 4–0, Cape Breton	2–2, round-robin, Rimouski/Moncton	L, 2–4, Rimouski	–
1998–99	Bye	W, 4–3, Rimouski	L, 2–4, Acadie–Bathurst	–
1999–2000	W, 4–0, Cape Breton	L, 3–4, Moncton	–	–
2000–01	L, 0–4, Acadie–Bathurst	–	–	–
2001–02	W, 4–0, Chicoutimi	L, 1–4, Acadie–Bathurst	–	–
2002–03	W, 4–2, Moncton	L, 1–4, Baie-Comeau	–	–
2003–04	L, 1–4, P.E.I.	–	–	–
2004–05	W, 4–3, Victoriaville	L, 2–4, Chicoutimi	–	–
2005–06	W, 4–1, Val-d'Or	W, 4–1, Shawinigan	W, 4–3, Acadie–Bathurst	L, 2–4, Moncton
2006–07	L, 1–4, Drummondville	–	–	–
2007–08	W, 4–2, Chicoutimi	L, 2–4, Gatineau	–	–
2008–09	W, 4–1, Baie-Comeau	W, 4–3, Cape Breton	L, 1–4, Shawinigan	–
2009–10	W, 4–1, Acadie–Bathurst	L, 0–4, Victoriaville	–	–
2010–11	W, 4–0, Val-d'Or	W, 4–3, Shawinigan	L, 3–4, Gatineau	–
2011–12	W, 4–0, Drummondville	L, 3–4, Halifax	–	–
2012–13	W, 4–2, Chicoutimi	L, 1–4, Rouyn-Noranda	–	–
2013–14	L, 1–4, Rouyn-Noranda	–	–	–
2014–15	W, 4–3, Cape Breton	W, 4–0, Charlottetown	W, 4–0, Moncton	L, 3–4, Rimouski
2015–16	L, 0–4, Gatineau	–	–	–
2016–17	L, 0–4, Acadie–Bathurst	–	–	–
2017–18	L, 3–4, Charlottetown	–	–	–
2018–19	L, 3–4, Halifax	–	–	–
2019–20	Playoffs cancelled due to COVID-19 pandemic			
2020–21	W, 3–0, Drummondville	L, 0–3, Chicoutimi	–	–
2021–22	W, 3–0, Chicoutimi	W, 3–1, Rimouski	L, 2–3, Shawinigan	–
2022–23	W, 4–0, Charlottetown	W, 4–0 Rimouski	W, 4–0, Gatineau	W, 4–2, Halifax
2023–24	Did not qualify			
2024–25	L, 0–4, Moncton	–	–	–
2025–26	W, 4–3, Charlottetown	L, 0–4, Chicoutimi	–	–

== See also ==
- CHRC (AM), defunct radio station owned by the Remparts
