= Tobias Lindberg =

Swedish ice hockey winger (born 1995)

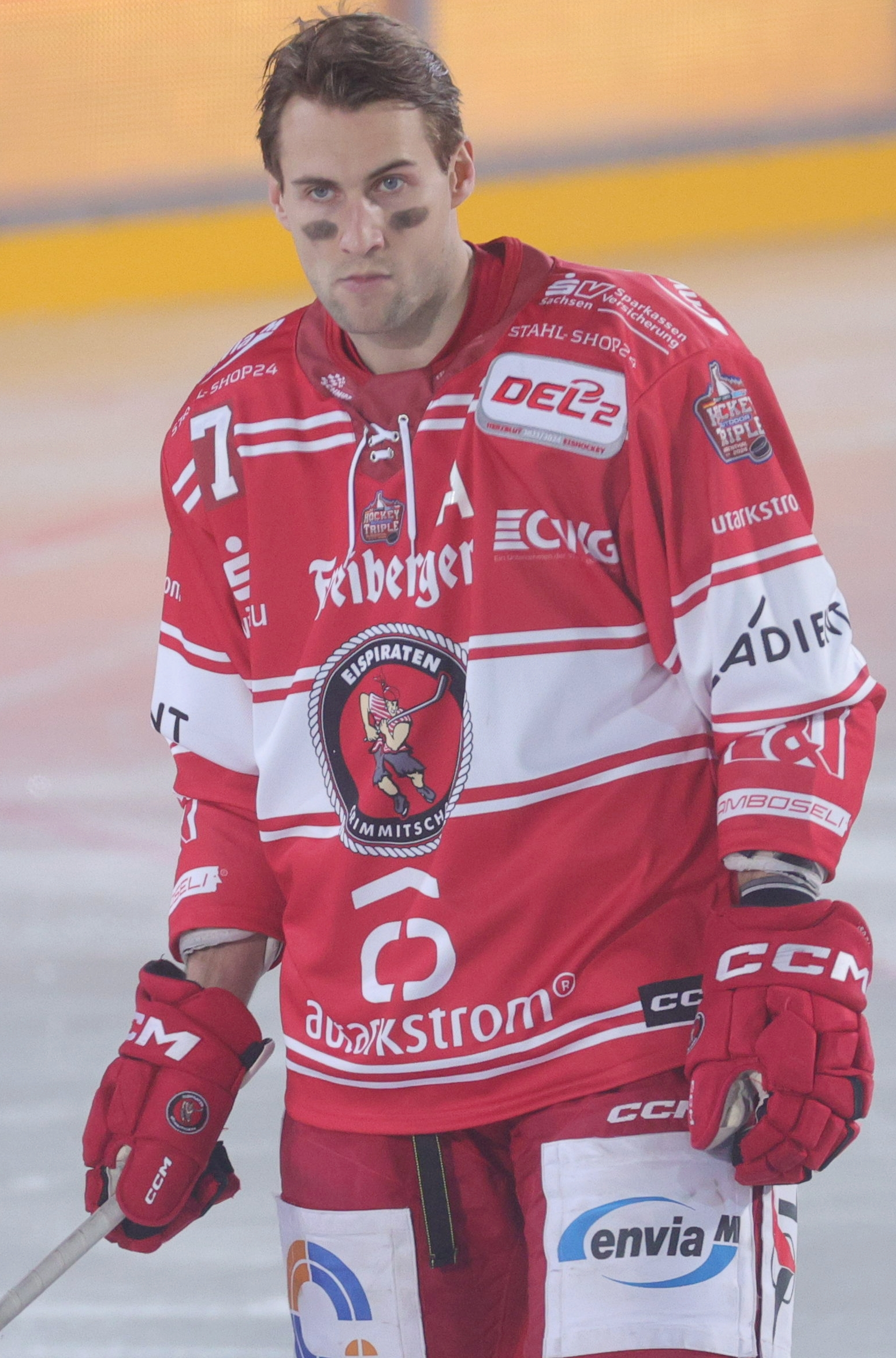
- Lindberg in 2024
- Born: 22 July 1995 (age 31) Stockholm, Sweden
- Height: 6 ft 3 in (191 cm)
- Weight: 217 lb (98 kg; 15 st 7 lb)
- Position: Winger
- Shoots: Left
- DEL2 team Former teams: Eispiraten Crimmitschau; Djurgårdens IF; Toronto Maple Leafs; Timrå IK; Väsby IK; Södertälje SK; HC Vítkovice
- NHL draft: 102nd overall, 2013; Ottawa Senators
- Playing career: 2013–present

Tobias Lindberg (born 22 July 1995) is a Swedish professional ice hockey winger who is currently playing with Eispiraten Crimmitschau of the DEL2. He has previously played in the HockeyAllsvenskan (Allsv), and in the National Hockey League (NHL) with the Toronto Maple Leafs. Lindberg was a member of the 2015 Memorial Cup champion Oshawa Generals.

== Playing career ==
Lindberg was drafted in the fourth round, 102nd overall, by the Ottawa Senators of the National Hockey League (NHL) in the 2013 NHL entry draft. He played junior in his native Sweden with Djurgårdens IF, before moving to North America to continue his career with the Oshawa Generals of the Ontario Hockey League. Lindberg was a member of the team that won the 2015 Memorial Cup, assisting on the game-winning goal, scored in overtime by teammate Anthony Cirelli.

About to turn 20, Lindberg was not eligible to play in junior anymore, and thus signed his first professional contract with Ottawa on 16 June 2015, a three-year entry-level. Lindberg played with Ottawa's American Hockey League (AHL) affiliate, the Binghamton Senators the opening half of the 2015–16 season. After recording 22 points in 34 games with Binghamton, Lindberg was included in a blockbuster nine-player trade that saw himself, Jared Cowen, Colin Greening, Milan Michálek, a 2017 second-round draft pick moved to the Toronto Maple Leafs in exchange for Dion Phaneuf, Matt Frattin, Casey Bailey, Ryan Rupert and Cody Donaghey. Lindberg's AHL numbers up until the trade were considered impressive due to his rookie status and the Senators' position at the bottom of the standings (being third last at the time of his departure). Lindberg joined the Toronto Marlies, who were at the top of the AHL (leading the second-placed team by 16 points at the time of the trade) and were favourites to win the 2016 Calder Cup.

Lindberg was one of twelve Toronto rookies to make their NHL debut in the final quarter of the 2015–16 season as part of the Maple Leafs youth movement. Lindberg was called up from the Marlies on 31 March 2016, and made his debut the same night in a 4–1 loss to the Buffalo Sabres, picking up an assist on the lone Toronto goal scored by teammate Brooks Laich.

The following season would be spent entirely with the Marlies, where the forward scored 16 points in 44 contests. He missed several weeks with an upper-body injury. At the start of the 2017–18 season, on 6 October 2017, Lindberg was traded to the expansion Vegas Golden Knights, alongside a 2018 sixth-round draft choice in exchange for goaltender Calvin Pickard. He was assigned to the Chicago Wolves of the AHL.

On 23 February 2018, Lindberg was traded from the Golden Knights to the Pittsburgh Penguins in exchange for Ryan Reaves. He was loaned by the Penguins to continue playing with the Wolves until the AHL season concluded.

In the following 2018–19 season, Lindberg was assigned and reported to the Penguins' AHL affiliate, the Wilkes-Barre/Scranton Penguins. He contributed with 6 points in 15 games with Wilkes-Barre before on 5 December 2018, Lindberg and Stefan Elliott were traded to the Ottawa Senators in exchange for Ben Sexton and Macoy Erkamps. Both players were immediately assigned to the Senators' AHL affiliate, the Belleville Senators. Lindberg struggled to make an impact with Belleville, producing 6 points through 29 games.

At the trade deadline, Lindberg was dealt again by the Senators when he was included in the trade of Mark Stone to be re-acquired by the Vegas Golden Knights, in exchange for Erik Brännström, Oscar Lindberg and a 2020 2nd round pick. He was assigned to continue in the AHL with the Chicago Wolves. In returning for a second stint with the Wolves, Lindberg helped the club reach the Calder Cup finals before falling to the Charlotte Checkers. He scored 2 goals in 13 playoff games.

On 25 June 2019, Lindberg was not tendered a qualifying offer by the Golden Knights, allowing him to become an unrestricted free agent.

== Career statistics ==
=== Regular season and playoffs ===
			Regular season					Playoffs
Season	Team	League	GP	G	A	Pts	PIM	GP	G	A	Pts	PIM
2012–13	Djurgårdens IF	J20	43	9	13	22	30	2	0	2	2	2
2012–13	Djurgårdens IF	Allsv	5	0	1	1	0	1	0	0	0	4
2013–14	Djurgårdens IF	J20	38	7	15	22	93	4	2	1	3	12
2013–14	Djurgårdens IF	Allsv	3	0	0	0	0	—	—	—	—	—
2014–15	Oshawa Generals	OHL	67	32	46	78	14	21	7	12	19	8
2015–16	Binghamton Senators	AHL	34	5	17	22	8	—	—	—	—	—
2015–16	Toronto Marlies	AHL	22	6	6	12	12	3	0	0	0	2
2015–16	Toronto Maple Leafs	NHL	6	0	2	2	4	—	—	—	—	—
2016–17	Toronto Marlies	AHL	44	6	10	16	34	—	—	—	—	—
2017–18	Chicago Wolves	AHL	64	10	13	23	30	2	0	1	1	0
2018–19	Wilkes-Barre/Scranton Penguins	AHL	15	2	4	6	10	—	—	—	—	—
2018–19	Belleville Senators	AHL	29	3	3	6	6	—	—	—	—	—
2018–19	Chicago Wolves	AHL	17	0	4	4	12	13	2	0	2	4
2019–20	Timrå IK	Allsv	33	5	10	15	22	1	1	1	2	0
2020–21	Väsby IK	Allsv	38	14	15	29	121	—	—	—	—	—
2021–22	Södertälje SK	Allsv	14	0	6	6	6	—	—	—	—	—
2021–22	HC Vítkovice	ELH	18	3	4	7	29	6	3	1	4	14
2022–23	HC Vítkovice	ELH	34	3	8	11	12	10	0	0	0	6
2023–24	Eispiraten Crimmitschau	DEL2	51	23	31	54	54	13	8	10	18	21
NHL totals			6	0	2	2	4	—	—	—	—	—
ELH totals			52	6	12	18	41	16	3	1	4	20

=== International ===
Year	Team	Event	Result	GP	G	A	Pts	PIM
2012	Sweden	U17	4th	6	0	1	1	4
Junior totals				6	0	1	1	4
