= Dakota Mermis =

American ice hockey player (born 1994)

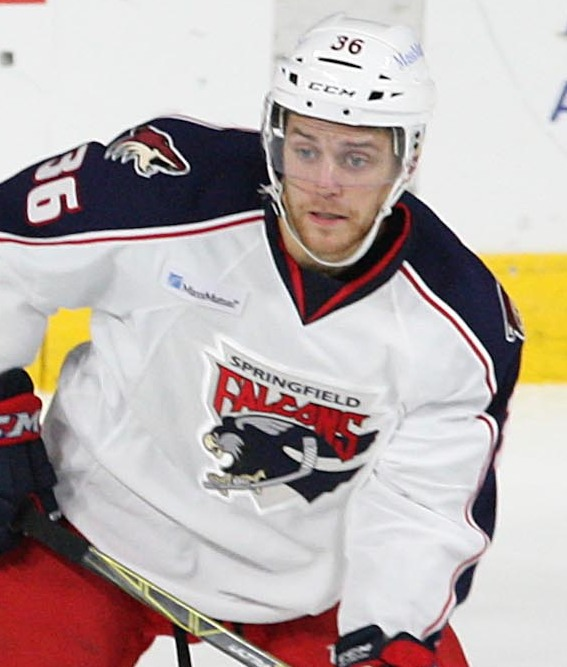
- Mermis with the Springfield Falcons in 2015
- Born: January 5, 1994 (age 32) Alton, Illinois, U.S.
- Height: 6 ft 0 in (183 cm)
- Weight: 196 lb (89 kg; 14 st 0 lb)
- Position: Defense
- Shoots: Left
- NHL team (P) Cur. team Former teams: Toronto Maple Leafs; Toronto Marlies (AHL); Arizona Coyotes; New Jersey Devils; Minnesota Wild; Utah Hockey Club
- NHL draft: Undrafted
- Playing career: 2015–present

Dakota Mermis (born January 5, 1994) is an American professional ice hockey player who is a defenseman for the Toronto Marlies of the American Hockey League (AHL) while under contract to the Toronto Maple Leafs of the National Hockey League (NHL).

== Early life ==
Mermis was born on January 5, 1994, in Alton, Illinois, U.S. to parents Bill and Jolene. Mermis was born into an athletic family as his uncle, father, and brother were all involved in sports. His uncle Randall McDaniel was inducted into the Pro Football Hall of Fame while his father and brother played ice hockey.

== Playing career ==
Undrafted, Mermis originally played in the United States Hockey League with the Lincoln Stars before developing within the USA Hockey National Team Development Program in the 2010–11 season. He left the U.S. Junior program the following season in linking up with the Green Bay Gamblers in his last season in the USHL.

Mermis committed and began his freshman year of college hockey at the University of Denver in the 2012–13 season, before leaving the Pioneers after just 19 games to progress to major junior hockey in the Ontario Hockey League with the London Knights and Oshawa Generals.

Following the conclusion of his major junior career with the Memorial Cup winning Generals after the 2014–15 season, Mermis' unconventional development path was rewarded as he was signed as a free agent to a three-year, entry-level contract with the Arizona Coyotes on July 2, 2015.

In the 2017–18 season, having played in the opening 7 games of the season with AHL affiliate, the Tucson Roadrunners, Mermis received his first recall by the Coyotes on November 1, 2017. With an injury to fellow Coyotes defenseman Niklas Hjalmarsson, Mermis made his NHL debut the following day in a defeat to the Buffalo Sabres.

Having appeared in 10 NHL games with the Coyotes during his four seasons within the organization, Mermis left as a free agent to sign a one-year, two-way $700,000 contract with the New Jersey Devils on July 1, 2019. He initially joined the Binghamton Devils in the AHL to begin the 2019–20 season, leading the blueline in scoring with 19 points through 53 games. Recalled by New Jersey to the NHL, Mermis scored his first career NHL goal against the St. Louis Blues on March 6, 2020. He registered his first multi-point game the following night against the New York Rangers. Mermis appeared in 10 games with the Devils, posting four points, before their season was ended due to the COVID-19 pandemic.

Mermis left the Devils as a free agent after the season and signed to a one-year, two-way contract with the Minnesota Wild on October 9, 2020.

Mermis won the Yanick Dupre Memorial Award while playing for the Wild's AHL affiliate, the Iowa Wild, in the 2021–22 season.

Following four seasons within the Wild organization, Mermis left as a free agent and was signed to a one-year, $775,000 contract with the Toronto Maple Leafs on July 2, 2024. Mermis was injured to start the 2024–25 season, and played three games on a conditioning stint with AHL affiliate, the Toronto Marlies. Placed on waivers by the Maple Leafs in his return to health, Mermis was claimed by the Utah Hockey Club on December 12, 2024. After playing only one game for Utah, Mermis was waived again on January 2, 2025, and subsequently re-claimed by Toronto the following day.

== Career statistics ==
=== Regular season and playoffs ===
			Regular season					Playoffs
Season	Team	League	GP	G	A	Pts	PIM	GP	G	A	Pts	PIM
2009–10	St. Louis Amateur Blues	T1EHL	48	11	26	37	76	—	—	—	—	—
2009–10	Lincoln Stars	USHL	2	0	1	1	0	—	—	—	—	—
2010–11	U.S. National Development Team	USHL	36	4	4	8	53	2	0	0	0	0
2011–12	Green Bay Gamblers	USHL	60	5	22	27	98	12	0	1	1	20
2012–13	University of Denver	WCHA	19	1	3	4	14	—	—	—	—	—
2012–13	London Knights	OHL	27	2	9	11	34	21	1	3	4	21
2013–14	London Knights	OHL	66	5	20	25	76	9	1	3	4	12
2014–15	London Knights	OHL	36	1	10	11	36	—	—	—	—	—
2014–15	Oshawa Generals	OHL	30	5	14	19	50	21	1	14	15	14
2015–16	Springfield Falcons	AHL	63	3	10	13	58	—	—	—	—	—
2015–16	Rapid City Rush	ECHL	5	1	2	3	6	—	—	—	—	—
2016–17	Tucson Roadrunners	AHL	67	2	10	12	75	—	—	—	—	—
2017–18	Tucson Roadrunners	AHL	59	2	17	19	45	9	3	2	5	11
2017–18	Arizona Coyotes	NHL	9	0	0	0	0	—	—	—	—	—
2018–19	Tucson Roadrunners	AHL	62	3	21	24	49	—	—	—	—	—
2018–19	Arizona Coyotes	NHL	1	0	0	0	0	—	—	—	—	—
2019–20	Binghamton Devils	AHL	53	3	16	19	23	—	—	—	—	—
2019–20	New Jersey Devils	NHL	10	1	3	4	4	—	—	—	—	—
2020–21	Minnesota Wild	NHL	3	0	0	0	0	—	—	—	—	—
2021–22	Iowa Wild	AHL	59	3	21	24	86	—	—	—	—	—
2021–22	Minnesota Wild	NHL	2	0	0	0	0	—	—	—	—	—
2022–23	Iowa Wild	AHL	63	5	21	26	73	2	0	1	1	2
2022–23	Minnesota Wild	NHL	2	0	0	0	0	—	—	—	—	—
2023–24	Minnesota Wild	NHL	47	3	5	8	33	—	—	—	—	—
2023–24	Iowa Wild	AHL	5	0	2	2	12	—	—	—	—	—
2024–25	Toronto Marlies	AHL	32	0	7	7	22	—	—	—	—	—
2024–25	Utah Hockey Club	NHL	1	0	0	0	2	—	—	—	—	—
2024–25	Toronto Maple Leafs	NHL	3	0	1	1	0	—	—	—	—	—
2025–26	Toronto Marlies	AHL	27	1	6	7	36	24	0	10	10	24
2025–26	Toronto Maple Leafs	NHL	11	1	0	1	11	—	—	—	—	—
NHL totals			89	5	9	14	50	—	—	—	—	—

=== International ===
Year	Team	Event	Result	GP	G	A	Pts	PIM
2011	United States	U17	2nd place, silver medalist(s)	5	0	1	1	4
Junior totals				5	0	1	1	4

== Awards and honors ==
Award	Year	Ref
USHL
USHL/NHL Top Prospects Game	2012	
Clark Cup champion	2012	
OHL
J. Ross Robertson Cup champion	2013, 2015	
Memorial Cup champion	2015	
AHL
Yanick Dupre Memorial Award	2022	
Calder Cup champion	2026	
