= Adam Erne =

American ice hockey player (born 1995)

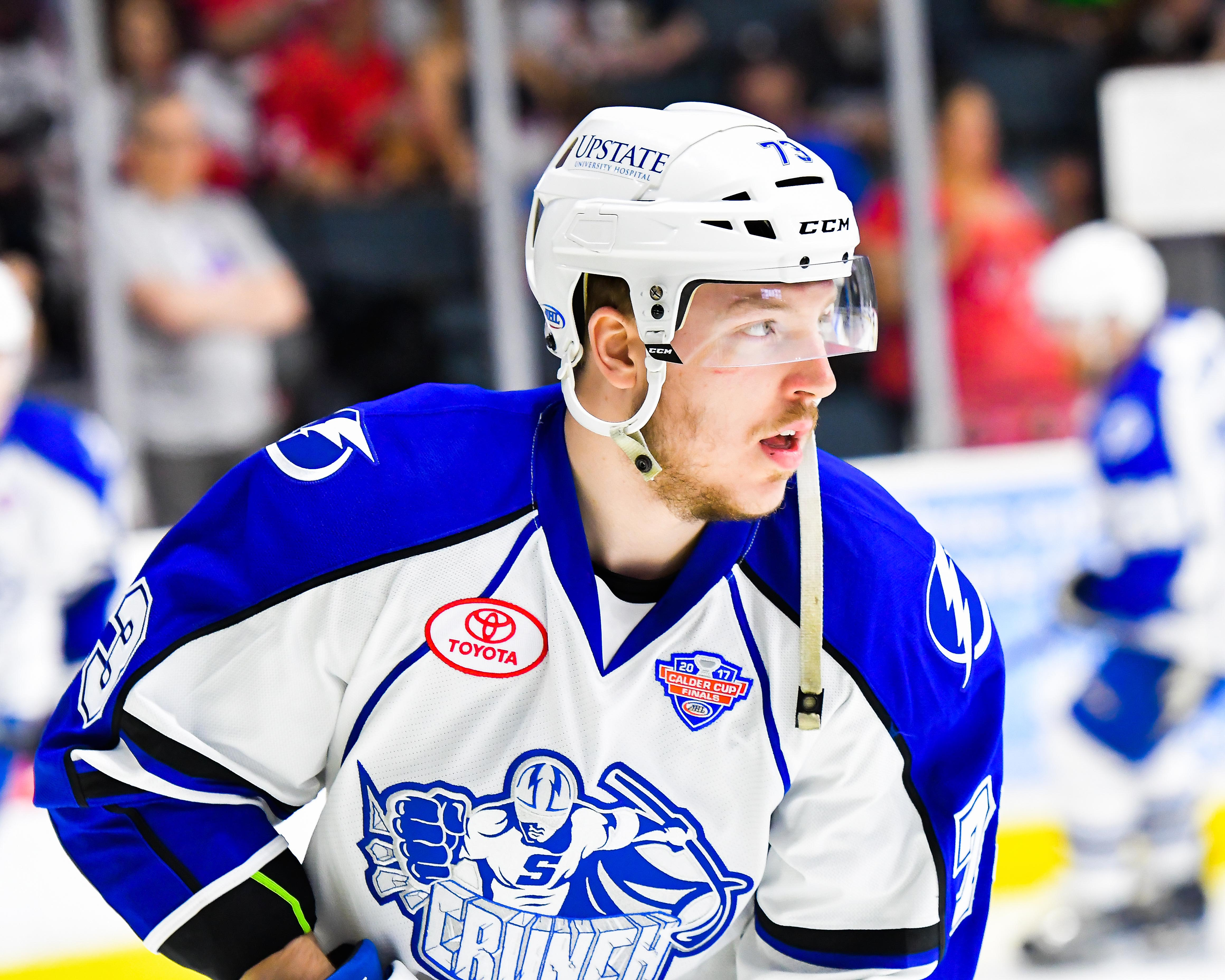
- Erne with the Syracuse Crunch in 2017
- Born: April 20, 1995 (age 31) New Haven, Connecticut, U.S.
- Height: 6 ft 1 in (185 cm)
- Weight: 209 lb (95 kg; 14 st 13 lb)
- Position: Winger
- Shoots: Left
- NHL team Former teams: Free agent Tampa Bay Lightning; Detroit Red Wings; Edmonton Oilers; Dallas Stars
- NHL draft: 33rd overall, 2013; Tampa Bay Lightning
- Playing career: 2015–present

Adam Dennis Erne (born April 20, 1995) is an American professional ice hockey winger who is currently an unrestricted free agent. He most recently played for the Dallas Stars of the National Hockey League (NHL). He was drafted in the second round, 33rd overall, by the Tampa Bay Lightning in the 2013 NHL entry draft, and has also played for the Detroit Red Wings and Edmonton Oilers.

== Playing career ==
=== Juniors ===
Erne grew up playing hockey in North Branford, Connecticut before moving to Los Angeles at the age of 13 to skate for a select team. He began his junior career with the Indiana Ice of the United States Hockey League. In his one-season, he recorded 10 goals and 18 points over 45 games. The Ice's head coach, Charlie Skjodt, told The Hockey News that Erne often led the team in hits. He was eventually offered a scholarship to play ice hockey at Boston University.

On April 1, 2014, the Lightning signed Erne to an entry-level contract.

In his final season with the Quebec Remparts, Erne was awarded the Guy Lafleur Trophy as the Quebec Major Junior Hockey League playoff most valuable player, following the team's game seven President Cup final victory. The Remparts ultimately fell to the Kelowna Rockets in the 2015 Memorial Cup. During the regular season, Erne recorded 41 goals and 45 assists for 86 points, along with a plus-21 and 102 penalty minutes.

=== Professional ===
On September 19, 2013, the NHL Department of Player Safety announced that Erne would have a hearing for an incident during a preseason game against the St. Louis Blues on Wednesday night at the Amway Center in Orlando, Florida. In the first period, Erne was assessed a minor penalty for an illegal check to the head for a hit on St. Louis forward Vladimir Sobotka. Sobotka left the game after the hit and did not return. On the same day, the NHL announced that Erne had been suspended for three preseason games for delivering an illegal check to the head of Sobotka.

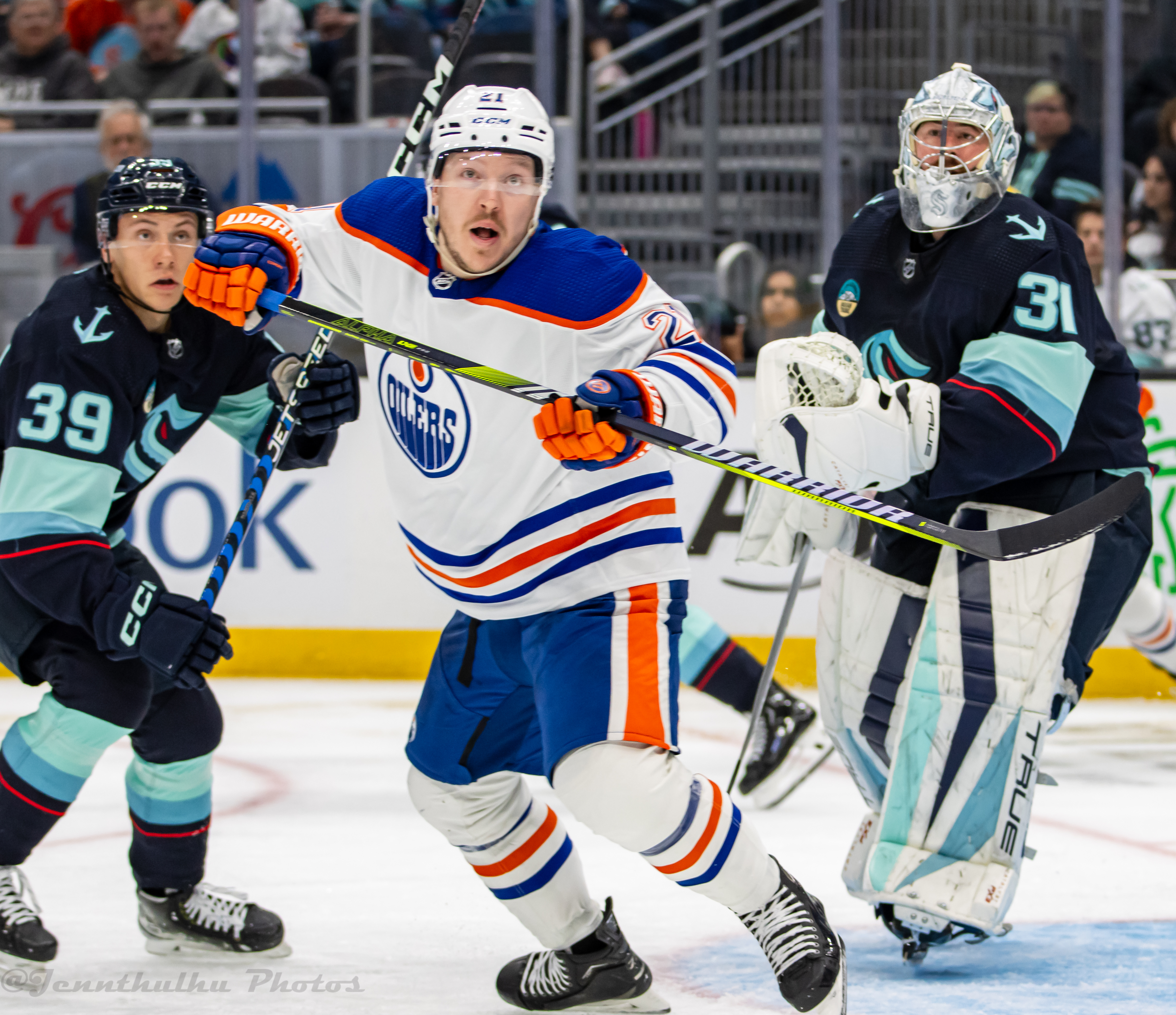
Erne playing with the Edmonton Oilers in 2023.

On January 2, 2017, the Lightning recalled Erne from the Syracuse Crunch. On January 3, 2017, Lightning head coach, Jon Cooper, informed the media that Erne would be making his NHL debut. Erne found out that he was making his NHL debut when he walked into the room that morning and saw his number on the board. Erne made his NHL debut that night against the Winnipeg Jets. On March 3, 2017, Erne recorded his first career NHL goal and point against the Pittsburgh Penguins at PPG Paints Arena. On March 20, 2018, Erne recorded his first career NHL assist. The assist came in a 4–3 Lightning win over the visiting Toronto Maple Leafs.

On August 14, 2019, Erne was traded to the Detroit Red Wings in exchange for a fourth-round pick in the 2020 NHL entry draft. During the shortened 2020-21 season, Erne scored 11 goals, tied for the team lead with teammate Anthony Mantha.

On September 12, 2023, Erne signed a professional tryout agreement with the Edmonton Oilers. On October 13, 2023, Erne was signed to a one-year, two-way contract worth $775,000 by the Oilers. In the 2023–24 season, Erne made 24 regular season appearances with the Oilers registering 1 goal and 1 assist. He split the season with the Oilers AHL affiliate, the Bakersfield Condors, posting 6 goals and 12 points through 36 games.

As a free agent from the Oilers, he went un-signed over the summer. On September 10, 2024, Erne accepted an invitation to attend the New York Rangers training camp for the 2024–25 season on a professional tryout (PTO). Without a contract offer from the Rangers, Erne was signed to a PTO with affiliate the Hartford Wolf Pack of the AHL to begin the season. Following 10 appearances with the Wolf Pack, registering just 1 assist, Erne was released from his PTO on November 16, 2024.

Again unsigned entering the 2025–26 season, Erne joined the Dallas Stars on a PTO on September 10, 2025; several weeks later, on October 7, Erne signed a one-year contract with the team, returning to the NHL.

== Career statistics ==
=== Regular season and playoffs ===
			Regular season					Playoffs
Season	Team	League	GP	G	A	Pts	PIM	GP	G	A	Pts	PIM
2010–11	Indiana Ice	USHL	45	10	8	18	49	3	0	1	1	0
2011–12	Quebec Remparts	QMJHL	64	28	27	55	32	11	2	4	6	10
2012–13	Quebec Remparts	QMJHL	68	28	44	72	67	11	5	5	10	19
2013–14	Quebec Remparts	QMJHL	48	21	41	62	65	1	0	1	1	2
2013–14	Syracuse Crunch	AHL	8	1	3	4	2	—	—	—	—	—
2014–15	Quebec Remparts	QMJHL	60	41	45	86	102	22	21	9	30	17
2015–16	Syracuse Crunch	AHL	59	14	15	29	74	—	—	—	—	—
2016–17	Syracuse Crunch	AHL	42	14	15	29	42	22	3	7	10	8
2016–17	Tampa Bay Lightning	NHL	26	3	0	3	11	—	—	—	—	—
2017–18	Syracuse Crunch	AHL	41	12	14	26	38	—	—	—	—	—
2017–18	Tampa Bay Lightning	NHL	23	3	1	4	11	—	—	—	—	—
2018–19	Tampa Bay Lightning	NHL	65	7	13	20	40	3	0	0	0	2
2019–20	Detroit Red Wings	NHL	56	2	3	5	28	—	—	—	—	—
2020–21	Detroit Red Wings	NHL	45	11	9	20	26	—	—	—	—	—
2021–22	Detroit Red Wings	NHL	79	6	13	19	34	—	—	—	—	—
2022–23	Detroit Red Wings	NHL	61	8	10	18	21	—	—	—	—	—
2022–23	Grand Rapids Griffins	AHL	9	0	5	5	4	—	—	—	—	—
2023–24	Edmonton Oilers	NHL	24	1	1	2	9	—	—	—	—	—
2023–24	Bakersfield Condors	AHL	36	6	6	12	22	2	0	0	0	2
2024–25	Hartford Wolf Pack	AHL	10	0	1	1	8	—	—	—	—	—
2025–26	Dallas Stars	NHL	45	6	2	8	19	1	0	0	0	0
NHL totals			424	47	52	99	199	4	0	0	0	2

=== International ===
Year	Team	Event	Result	GP	G	A	Pts	PIM
2012	United States	IH18	7th	4	5	1	6	0
2014	United States	WJC	5th	5	0	1	1	0
Junior totals				9	5	2	7	0

== Awards and honors ==
Award	Year
Guy Lafleur Trophy	2015
