= 2015 Memorial Cup =

Canadian junior men's ice hockey championship

Tournament details
- Venue(s): Colisée Pepsi; Quebec City, Quebec
- Dates: May 22–31, 2015
- Teams: 4
- Host team: Quebec Remparts (QMJHL)
- TV partner(s): Sportsnet, TVA Sports

Final positions
- Champions: Oshawa Generals (OHL) (5th title)
- Runners-up: Kelowna Rockets (WHL)

Tournament statistics
- Attendance: 79,930
- Scoring leader: Leon Draisaitl (Rockets) (7 points)

Awards
- MVP: Leon Draisaitl (Rockets)

The 2015 Memorial Cup (branded as the 2015 Mastercard Memorial Cup for sponsorship reasons) was a four-team round-robin format tournament that began on 22 May and ended on 31 May, 2015. It was the 97th Memorial Cup championship and determined the champion of the Canadian Hockey League (CHL). The tournament was hosted by the Quebec Remparts of Quebec City, Quebec, who won the right to host the tournament over a bid by the Chicoutimi Saguenéens. They were joined by the WHL champion Kelowna Rockets, the OHL champion Oshawa Generals, and the QMJHL champion Rimouski Océanic.

Since the inclusion of the host team in the Memorial Cup format in 1983, the 2015 edition of the Memorial Cup is the only tournament in which all four of the participating teams had previously won the Memorial Cup. The Oshawa Generals won four in 1939, 1940, 1944 & 1990, the Quebec Remparts won two in 1971 & 2006, the Kelowna Rockets won in 2004, and the Rimouski Océanic won in 2000.

The tournament ended with the Oshawa Generals winning their fifth Memorial Cup with an overtime win over the Kelowna Rockets 2–1 in the championship game. This final game of the tournament was also the last competitive hockey game played in the Colisée Pepsi before the Remparts move to the Videotron Centre in September 2015.

== Round-robin standings ==
The Memorial Cup trophy

Pos	Team	Pld	W	L	GF	GA	GD	Pts	PCT	PIM	
1	Oshawa Generals (OHL)	3	3	0	11	8	3	6	1.000	25	Advanced directly to the championship game
2	Kelowna Rockets (WHL)	3	1	2	11	9	2	2	.333	63	Advanced to the semifinal game
3	Rimouski Océanic (QMJHL)	3	1	2	10	11	−1	2	.333	40	
4	Quebec Remparts (QMJHL/Host)	3	1	2	8	12	−4	2	.333	48	Advanced to the semifinal game

Updated to match(es) played on unknown. Source:

Kelowna, Rimouski, and Quebec finished tied for second in points. Based on the rules for 2015, the tiebreaker was a two-step process. Results from the games against Oshawa were removed and the teams' remaining goals for, divided by the sum of their goals for plus goals against, were calculated. This resulted in Kelowna (10/[10+7]=0.59) advancing directly to the semi-final (and receiving home ice advantage). In the second step, Quebec defeated Rimouski in a sudden-death tiebreaker game to advance to the semi-final.

Note: Quebec had finished behind Rimouski in the round robin when applying the new total-goal-index calculation, or the goal differential, or their round robin loss to Rimouski.

== Schedule ==
All times local (UTC −5)

=== Round robin ===
May 22	Kelowna Rockets	3 – 4	Quebec Remparts	Colisée Pepsi	Recap
No scoring		First period	5:18 - Nikolas Brouillard (1)
Nick Merkley (1) - sh - 17:56		Second period	13:22 - Matt Murphy (1)
Gage Quinney (1) - pp - 12:43; Leon Draisaitl (1) - pp - 19:24		Third period	2:08 - sh - Ryan Graves (1); 18:56 - en - Adam Erne (1)
Jackson Whistle 27 saves / 30 shots		Goalie stats	Zachary Fucale 26 saves / 29 shots

May 23	Rimouski Océanic	3 – 4	Oshawa Generals	Colisée Pepsi	Recap
15:26 - Tyler Boland (1); 16:10 - Alexis Loiseau (1)		First period	Tobias Lindberg (1) - 4:07; Michael Dal Colle (1) - 9:27
No scoring		Second period	Stephen Desrocher (1) - 18:33
3:46 - pp - Jan Kostalek (1)		Third period	Hunter Smith (1) - 9:24
Philippe Desrosiers 33 saves / 37 shots		Goalie stats	Ken Appleby 19 saves / 22 shots

May 24	Quebec Remparts	4 – 5	OT	Oshawa Generals	Colisée Pepsi	Recap
Raphaël Maheux (1) - 5:43		First period		2:18 - Michael McCarron (1); 12:40 - Michael Dal Colle (2)
Ryan Graves (2) - 2:45		Second period		No scoring
Dmytro Timashov (1) - pp - 5:39; Dmytro Timashov (2) - 8:48		Third period		2:34 - Dakota Mermis (1); 17:51 - pp - Tobias Lindberg (2)
No scoring		First overtime period		18:07 - Stephen Desrocher (2)
Zachary Fucale 45 saves / 50 shots		Goalie stats		Ken Appleby 21 saves / 25 shots

May 25	Rimouski Océanic	3 – 7	Kelowna Rockets	Colisée Pepsi	Recap
Christopher Clapperton (1) - 15:14; Michael Joly (1) - pp - 18:14		First period	0:52 - Nick Merkley (2); 6:16 - Madison Bowey (1); 14:27 - Gage Quinney (2)
No scoring		Second period	1:52 - pp - Gage Quinney (3); 10:42 - Nick Merkley (3); 13:18 - Leon Draisaitl (2)
Frederik Gauthier (1) - pp - 13:36		Third period	14:16 - sh - Leon Draisaitl (3)
Louis-Philip Guindon 17 saves / 22 shots Philippe Desrosiers 12 saves / 14 shots		Goalie stats	Jackson Whistle 28 saves / 31 shots

May 26	Oshawa Generals	2 – 1	Kelowna Rockets	Colisée Pepsi	Recap
No scoring		First period	No scoring
Cole Cassels (1) - 4:15; Tobias Lindberg (3) - 17:16		Second period	18:11 - Gage Quinney (4)
No scoring		Third period	No scoring
Ken Appleby 20 saves / 21 shots		Goalie stats	Jackson Whistle 27 saves / 29 shots

May 27	Quebec Remparts	0 – 4	Rimouski Océanic	Colisée Pepsi	Recap
No scoring		First period	14:36 - Justin Samson (1); 19:05 - Michael Joly (2)
No scoring		Second period	5:36 - pp - Christopher Clapperton (2); 12:40 - pp - Alexis Loiseau (2)
No scoring		Third period	No scoring
Zachary Fucale 21 saves / 25 shots Callum Booth 17 saves / 17 shots		Goalie stats	Philippe Desrosiers 27 saves / 27 shots

=== Playoff round ===
==== Tiebreaker ====
May 28	Quebec Remparts	5 – 2	Rimouski Océanic	Colisée Pepsi	Recap
Jerome Verrier (1) - pp - 17:19		First period	No scoring
Anthony Duclair (1) - 3:58; Adam Erne (2) - 16:54; Jerome Verrier (2) - 19:19		Second period	2:32 - pp - Samuel Morin (1); 16:07 - Jeremy Lepine (1)
Marc-Olivier Roy (1) - 11:31		Third period	No scoring
Zachary Fucale 30 saves / 32 shots		Goalie stats	Philippe Desrosiers 26 saves / 31 shots

==== Semi-final ====
May 29	Quebec Remparts	3 – 9	Kelowna Rockets	Colisée Pepsi	Recap
Adam Erne (3) - 3:11		First period	9:51 - Chance Braid (1)
No scoring		Second period	0:17 - pp - Leon Draisaitl (4); 3:23 - pp - Justin Kirkland (1); 4:06 - Justin Kirkland (2); 16:46 - Josh Morrissey (1)
Anthony Duclair (2) - 0:21; Dmytro Timashov (3) - 6:45		Third period	2:17 - Rourke Chartier (1); 2:54 - Cole Linaker (1); 13:26 - pp - Tyson Baillie (1); 14:48 - Rourke Chartier (2)
Zachary Fucale 35 saves / 44 shots		Goalie stats	Jackson Whistle 20 saves / 23 shots

==== Final ====
May 31	Kelowna Rockets	1 – 2	OT	Oshawa Generals	Colisée Pepsi	Recap
Tomáš Šoustal (1) - 15:08		First period		No scoring
No scoring		Second period		13:50 - Anthony Cirelli (1)
No scoring		Third period		No scoring
No scoring		First overtime period		1:28 - Anthony Cirelli (2)
Jackson Whistle 24 saves / 26 shots		Goalie stats		Ken Appleby 37 saves / 38 shots

== Statistical leaders ==
=== Skaters ===
Player	Team	GP	G	A	Pts	PIM
Leon Draisaitl	Kelowna Rockets	5	4	3	7	12
Adam Erne	Quebec Remparts	5	3	3	6	6
Michael Joly	Rimouski Océanic	4	2	4	6	2
Tyson Baillie	Kelowna Rockets	5	1	5	6	0
Madison Bowey	Kelowna Rockets	5	1	5	6	10
Gage Quinney	Kelowna Rockets	5	4	1	5	0
Tobias Lindberg	Oshawa Generals	4	3	2	5	0
Nick Merkley	Kelowna Rockets	5	3	2	5	14
Michael Dal Colle	Oshawa Generals	4	2	3	5	0
Alexis Loiseau	Rimouski Océanic	4	2	3	5	0

GP = Games played; G = Goals; A = Assists; Pts = Points; PIM = Penalty minutes

=== Goaltending ===
This is a combined table of the top goaltenders based on goals against average and save percentage with at least sixty minutes played. The table is sorted by GAA.

Player	Team	GP	W	L	OTL	SA	GA	GAA	SV%	SO	TOI
Ken Appleby	Oshawa Generals	4	4	0	0	97	9	2.08	.915	0	260
Jackson Whistle	Kelowna Rockets	5	2	2	1	139	13	2.60	.906	0	300
Philippe Desrosiers	Rimouski Océanic	4	1	2	0	109	11	3.23	.899	1	204
Zachary Fucale	Quebec Remparts	5	2	2	1	180	23	4.75	.872	0	291

GP = Games played; W = Wins; L = Losses; SA = Shots against; GA = Goals against; GAA = Goals against average; SV% = Save percentage; SO = Shutouts; TOI = Time on ice (minutes:seconds)

== Awards ==
- Stafford Smythe Memorial Trophy (MVP): Leon Draisaitl, Kelowna Rockets
- Ed Chynoweth Trophy (Leading Scorer): Leon Draisaitl, Kelowna Rockets
- George Parsons Trophy (Sportsmanlike): Alexis Loiseau, Rimouski Océanic
- Hap Emms Memorial Trophy (Top Goalie): Ken Appleby, Oshawa Generals
- All-Star Team:

Goaltender: Ken Appleby, Oshawa Generals
Defence: Madison Bowey, Kelowna Rockets; Ryan Graves, Quebec Remparts
Forwards: Nick Merkley, Kelowna Rockets; Michael McCarron, Oshawa Generals; Michael Dal Colle, Oshawa Generals

== Rosters ==
=== Quebec Remparts (Host) ===
- Head coach: Philippe Boucher

Pos.	No.	Player
G	30	Callum Booth
G	31	Zachary Fucale
D	5	Raphaël Maheux
D	7	Brian Lovell
D	9	Aaron Dutra
D	15	Nikolas Brouillard
D	18	Cody Donaghey
D	27	Ryan Graves
D	55	Matt Murphy
D	76	Giancarlo Fiori
D	94	Olivier Thibodeau
F	10	Anthony Duclair
F	11	Marc-Olivier Roy
F	14	Olivier Garneau
F	17	Yanick Turcotte
F	19	Kurt Etchegary
F	20	Donovan Rehill
F	21	Vladimir Tkachev
F	23	Massimo Carozza
F	24	Guillaume Gauthier
F	61	Marcus Cuomo
F	73	Adam Erne
F	77	Jérome Verrier
F	82	Jesse Sutton
F	88	Dmytro Timashov
F	96	Zachery Moody

=== Rimouski Océanic (QMJHL) ===
- Head coach: Serge Beausoleil

Pos.	No.	Player
G	30	Philippe Desrosiers
G	33	Louis-Philip Guindon
D	3	Jan Košťálek
D	6	Beau Rusk
D	24	Simon Bourque
D	27	Charles-David Beaudoin
D	42	Andrew Picco
D	55	Samuel Morin
D	68	Guillaume McSween
D	81	Eduard Nasybullin
F	10	Anthony Chapados
F	11	Deven St-Hilaire
F	15	Anthony DeLuca
F	16	Justin Vachon
F	18	William Couture
F	19	Justin Samson
F	22	Tyler Boland
F	23	Frédérik Gauthier
F	25	Jérémy Lépine
F	57	Christopher Clapperton
F	61	François Beauchemin
F	74	Alexis Loiseau
F	79	Samuel Laberge
F	88	Michael Joly

=== Kelowna Rockets (WHL) ===
- Head coach: Dan Lambert

Pos.	No.	Player
GK	1	Jackson Whistle
GK	30	Michael Herringer
GK	33	Jake Morrissey
D	3	Riley Stadel
D	4	Madison Bowey
D	6	Mitchell Wheaton
D	7	Lucas Johansen
D	8	Cole Martin
D	21	Devante Stephens
D	27	Josh Morrissey
D	28	Joe Gatenby
F	9	Tyler Wishnowski
F	10	Nick Merkley
F	11	Jordan Borstmayer
F	12	Tyrell Goulbourne
F	14	Rourke Chartier
F	15	Tomáš Šoustal
F	16	Kole Lind
F	17	Rodney Southam
F	18	Tate Coughlin
F	19	Dillon Dubé
F	20	Gage Quinney
F	22	Chance Braid
F	23	Justin Kirkland
F	24	Tyson Baillie
F	26	Cole Linaker
F	29	Leon Draisaitl

=== Oshawa Generals (OHL) ===
- Head coach: D. J. Smith

Pos.	No.	Player
GK	35	Ken Appleby
GK	56	Jeremy Brodeur
D	3	Josh Brown
D	6	Will Petschenig
D	7	Chris Carlisle
D	18	Sonny Hertzberg
D	24	Stephen Templeton
D	26	Daniel Robertson
D	37	Stephen Desrocher
D	44	Dakota Mermis
D	58	Mitchell Vande Sompel
F	10	Aidan Wallace
F	14	Bradley Latour
F	15	Michael Turner
F	17	Brent Pedersen
F	19	Cole Cassels
F	20	Matt Mistele
F	22	Anthony Cirelli
F	23	Tobias Lindberg
F	25	Kenny Huether
F	29	Joe Manchurek
F	34	Hunter Smith
F	55	Michael McCarron
F	71	Michael Dal Colle
F	89	Sam Harding

== Road to the Cup ==
=== WHL Playoffs ===
Conference Quarter-finals	Conference Semi-finals
E1	Brandon	4
C5	Edmonton	1
E1	Brandon	4
E2	Regina	1
E2	Regina	4
E3	Swift Current	0
Eastern
C1	Calgary	4
C4	Kootenay	3
C1	Calgary	4
C2	Medicine Hat	1
C2	Medicine Hat	4
C3	Red Deer	1
B1	Kelowna	4
W2	Tri-City	0
B1	Kelowna	4
B2	Victoria	1
B2	Victoria	4
B3	Prince George	1
Western
U1	Everett	4
W1	Spokane	2
U1	Everett	1
U2	Portland	4
U2	Portland	4
U3	Seattle	2

Conference Finals
E1	Brandon	4
C1	Calgary	1
B1	Kelowna	4
U2	Portland	2

WHL Championship
E1	Brandon	0
B1	Kelowna	4

=== OHL Playoffs ===
Conference Quarter-finals	Conference Semi-finals
1	Oshawa	4
8	Peterborough	1
1	Oshawa	4
5	Niagara	1
2	Barrie	4
7	Belleville	0
Eastern Conference
3	North Bay	4
6	Kingston	0
2	Barrie	1
3	North Bay	4
4	Ottawa	2
5	Niagara	4
Note: Pairings are re-seeded after the first round.
1	Sault Ste. Marie	4
8	Saginaw	0
1	Sault Ste. Marie	4
4	Guelph	0
2	Erie	4
7	Sarnia	1
Western Conference
3	London	4
6	Kitchener	2
2	Erie	4
3	London	0
4	Guelph	4
5	Owen Sound	1

Conference Finals
1	Oshawa	4
3	North Bay	2
1	Sault Ste. Marie	2
2	Erie	4

OHL Championship
E1	Oshawa	4
W2	Erie	1

=== QMJHL Playoffs ===
Round 1
1	Rimouski	4
16	Victoriaville	0
2	Moncton	4
15	Chicoutimi	1
3	Blainville-Boisbriand	2
14	Gatineau	4
4	Quebec	4
13	Cape Breton	3
Note: Pairings are re-seeded after the first and second rounds.
5	Shawinigan	3
12	Halifax	4
6	Val-d'Or	4
11	Rouyn-Noranda	2
7	Baie-Comeau	4
10	Saint John	1
8	Sherbrooke	2
9	Charlottetown	4

Quarter-finals
1	Rimouski	4
14	Gatineau	1
2	Moncton	4
12	Halifax	3
4	Quebec	4
9	Charlottetown	0
6	Val-d'Or	4
7	Baie-Comeau	3

Semi-finals
1	Rimouski	4
6	Val-d'Or	0
2	Moncton	0
4	Quebec	4

President's Cup Championship
1	Rimouski	4
4	Quebec	3
