= Paul Dumont =

Canadian ice hockey administrator (1920–2008)

- Born: June 15, 1920; Shawinigan, Quebec, Canada
- Died: April 9, 2008 (aged 87); Quebec City, Quebec, Canada
- Known for: President of QMJHL, co-founder of the Quebec Remparts and the Quebec International Pee-Wee Hockey Tournament
- Awards: CAHA Order of Merit; Hockey Québec Hall of Fame; QMJHL Hall of Fame

Paul Dumont (June 15, 1920 – April 9, 2008) was a Canadian ice hockey administrator. He was associated with the Quebec Major Junior Hockey League (QMJHL) from its founding in 1969 to 1984. He served as the general manager of the Quebec Remparts, then as the league's executive director and president. He established the first league office, and oversaw the development of its policies and procedures. He previously co-founded the Quebec International Pee-Wee Hockey Tournament and managed the junior Quebec Aces. He is the namesake of the Paul Dumont Trophy, and was inducted into both the Hockey Québec, and the QMJHL Halls of Fame.

== Early hockey career ==
Paul Dumont was born on June 15, 1920, in Shawinigan, Quebec.

In 1960, Dumont and Gérard Bolduc co-founded the Quebec International Pee-Wee Hockey Tournament with help from Pat Timmons, Jacques Boissinot, and Edmond de la Bruère. Dumont later became a farm system director for the Quebec Aces, and scouted future Aces players at the pee-wee tournament. He was part of a group of businessmen who purchased the junior portion of the Aces from the Philadelphia Flyers in 1969, and established the Quebec Remparts in the inaugural 1969–70 QMJHL season. The QMJHL recognizes Dumont as one of its founding fathers in 1969, which sought to end the flow of Quebec-born players into the Ontario Hockey Association (OHA).

Dumont served as general manager of the Remparts from 1969 to 1975. He successfully convinced Guy Lafleur to sign with the Remparts in 1969, instead of with the Montreal Junior Canadiens. During Dumont's six years with the Remparts, his team won the President's Cup four times, the Jean Rougeau Trophy three times, and the 1971 Memorial Cup championship. On route to the 1971 national title, the Remparts were awarded the George Richardson Memorial Trophy by default in the Eastern Canada finals, and Dumont did not understand why the St. Catharines Black Hawks failed to continue the series.

In 1973, the World Hockey Association (WHA) signed Remparts player Jacques Locas, and Dumont felt that Locas should be eligible to continue playing junior hockey despite signing a professional contract, until the Canadian Amateur Hockey Association (CAHA) ruled otherwise. In February 1975, Dumont was one of the QMJHL representatives at a meeting with the CAHA, the OHA, and the Western Hockey League (WHL), which discussed the use of overage players, and its effect on Memorial Cup play. He resigned as the Remparts general manager in 1975. On May 21, 1975, he was announced as the secretary treasurer of the new Canadian Major Junior Hockey League.

== Later hockey career ==
Dumont became the first executive director of the QMJHL in 1975, established a league office in Quebec City, and served in that role until 1983. In 1977, Dumont hired Gilles Courteau from the Trois-Rivières Draveurs, and made him the league statistician. Courteau credits Dumont as the architect of the QMJHL's structure, policies, procedures and regulations. Dumont later instituted the first midget-age player draft in the league, and assisted in transforming the Quebec Amateur Hockey Association into the modern Hockey Québec organization. He spoke out against the WHA having signed at least 17 junior-aged players to professional contracts by 1978, calling it "real violence" and disagreed that the Canadian junior ice hockey structure with players aged 16 to 20 year olds in the same league was irresponsible. During the 1980–81 QMJHL season, Dumont implemented rules for facemasks on hockey helmets for player safety. In 1982, he stated that eight of the nine teams lost money during the 1981–82 QMJHL season, due to decreasing attendance, and competition with professional hockey, for 18 and 19 year old players.

Dumont became the sixth president of the QMJHL following the death of Jean Rougeau, and served in that role from August 1983 to June 1984. During that time, he participated on the committee which oversaw the Canada men's national junior ice hockey team in 1984. In 1984, Dumont commented on the financial state of the league by saying that "there will always be junior ice hockey in some form because the people want it". He also felt that owning a junior ice hockey team was not a business venture for a quick return on investment, and that most owners were involved for the love of the game, and hoped to break even on expenses.

== Later life and honours ==
Dumont was awarded the Canadian Amateur Hockey Association Order of Merit in 1984. The QMJHL inaugurated the Paul Dumont Trophy during the 1989–90 QMJHL season, awarded to its personality of the year. Dumont was inducted into the Hockey Québec Hall of Fame in 1991, and the QMJHL Hall of Fame in 1997.

He died on April 9, 2008, at the Centre hospitalier de l'Université Laval, after being hospitalized for kidney failure and previous anemia and heart problems.
