= Parc Victoria =

Park in Quebec, Canada

Coordinates: 46.816°N 71.234°W

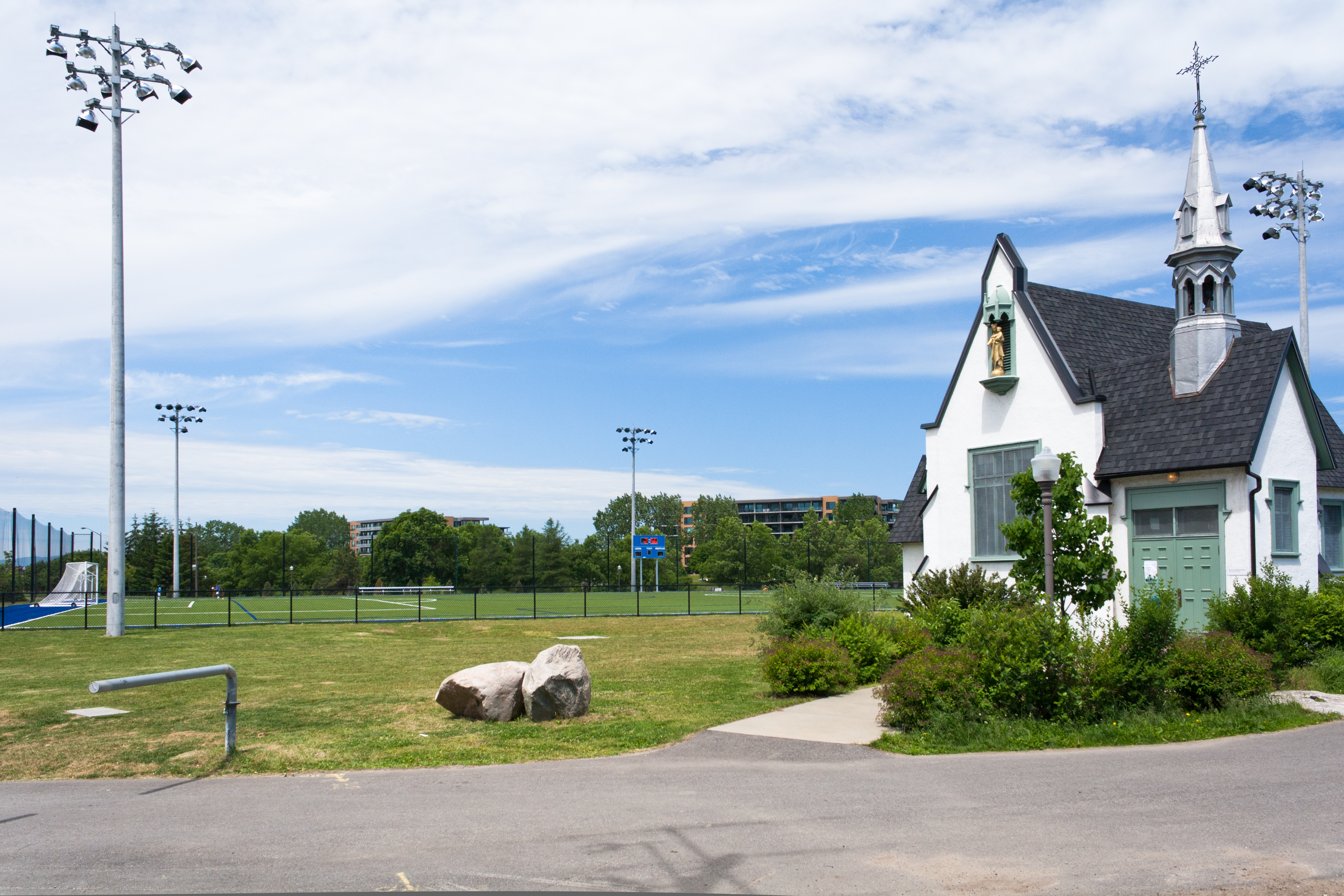
Parc Victoria from the southwest entrance.

Parc Victoria is a large urban park in Quebec City, Canada. It is located the Saint-Roch neighbourhood, on the south shore of the Saint-Charles River and opened in 1897.

Before its inauguration in 1897, the land belonged to the religious congregation of the Augustinians of the Mercy of Jesus. The park is named in honour of Queen Victoria in commemoration of her 60th birthday.

The park has sports facilities for soccer, volleyball, baseball, basketball, tennis, skateboarding, and hockey. On the grounds of this park is also the Stade Canac baseball stadium and the municipal court of Quebec. It was previously home to the Quebec Arena.

== See also ==
- Royal eponyms in Canada
