= Junior B =

Junior B may refer to:

- Junior ice hockey leagues in Canada:
  - Calgary Junior Hockey League
  - Capital Junior Hockey League, in Alberta
  - Capitale Junior AA Hockey League, in Quebec
  - Central Junior B Hockey League of the Ontario Junior Hockey League
  - Chaudiere-Appalaches Junior AA Hockey League, in Quebec
  - Eastern Ontario Junior Hockey League
  - Estrie-Mauricie Junior AA Hockey League, in Quebec
  - Greater Ontario Junior Hockey League
  - Heritage Junior B Hockey League in Alberta
  - Island Junior Hockey League, in Prince Edward Island
  - Keystone Junior Hockey League, in Manitoba
  - Kootenay International Junior Hockey League, in British Columbia
  - Laurentides-Lanaudière Junior AA Hockey League, in Quebec
  - Ligue de Hockey Junior AA Lac St-Louis, in Quebec
  - Ligue de Hockey Junior AA Saguenay-Lac-St-Jean, in Quebec
  - Métropolitaine Junior AA Hockey League, in Quebec
  - New Brunswick Junior B Hockey League
  - North Eastern Alberta Junior B Hockey League
  - North West Junior Hockey League, in Alberta and British Columbia
  - Nova Scotia Junior B Hockey League of the Nova Scotia Junior Hockey League
  - Pacific Junior Hockey League, in British Columbia
  - Prairie Junior Hockey League, in Saskatchewan
  - St. John's Junior Hockey League, in Newfoundland and Labrador
  - Thunder Bay Junior B Hockey League
  - Vancouver Island Junior Hockey League, in British Columbia
  - Western Junior B of the Western Ontario Hockey League
- Defunct junior ice hockey leagues in Canada
  - Border Cities Junior B Hockey League, a hockey league that operated in Ontario from 1958 to 1964
  - Eastern Junior B Hockey League, a hockey league in eastern Ontario
  - Golden Horseshoe Junior B of the Golden Horseshoe Junior Hockey League
  - International Junior B Hockey League, which operated in northern Ontario and northern Michigan in the United States
  - Metro Junior B Hockey League, predecessor of the Metro Junior A Hockey League
  - Mid-Ontario Junior B Hockey League in southern Ontario
  - Mid-Western Junior Hockey League, previously known as the Southwestern Junior B Hockey League (1973–1974) and the Waterloo-Wellington Junior B Hockey League 1974–1977
  - Niagara District Junior B Hockey League, that operated from 1956 to 1979
  - North of Superior Junior B Hockey League
  - North Saskatchewan Junior B Hockey League
  - Western Junior B Hockey League; see Western Ontario Hockey League
- Ontario Junior B Lacrosse League
