= Grand Falls Andcos =

- City: Grand Falls, NL
- League: Newfoundland Senior Hockey League
- Founded: 1956
- Home arena: Grand Falls Stadium
- Colours: Green, white

Franchise history
- 1928–55: Grand Falls All-Stars
- 1956–65: Grand Falls Andcos
- 1966-91: Grand Falls Cataracts
- 1991–present: Grand Falls-Windsor Cataracts

The Grand Falls Andcos were a senior ice hockey team based in Grand Falls, Newfoundland and Labrador in the Newfoundland Senior Hockey League that won six Herder Memorial championships in seven years as all-Newfoundland champions. With the support of the Anglo-Newfoundland Development Company (A.N.D. Co.), owners of the town's pulp and paper mill and the builder of a new state-of-the-art stadium in 1947, the team that later became known as the Andcos built a strong roster with imported players and dominated Newfoundland senior hockey during the 1950s.

== History ==
Grand Falls was established in 1905 as a company-built town and was administered by the Anglo Newfoundland Development Company Ltd (A.N.D. Co. Ltd.) until 1961 when the town was incorporated as a municipality (The mill was acquired in 1961 by Price Brothers). The Grand Falls Athletic Association (GFAA) organized and governed hockey in the town including management of the Grand Falls All-Stars hockey club.

GFAA was picking players from the local senior league to form an all-star team at least as early as 1928 and occasionally played inter-town games with other hockey centres, including St. John's, Corner Brook, Buchans and Bay Roberts, before hockey was organized island-wide. In 1935, at the conclusion of the annual home and home inter-papertown series between Grand Falls and Corner Brook, it was agreed that Corner Brook would represent Western Newfoundland to play the eastern champion Guards from St. John's in a two-game series at the Prince's Rink to determine the first hockey champions of Newfoundland. Corner Brook were victorious and were awarded the first Herder Memorial Trophy. The Newfoundland Amateur Hockey Association was formed in December 1935 and beginning in 1936 the Western division champion would travel to the capital city in March to participate in the Herder Championship series.

The A.N.D. Co. funded the construction of a new stadium for Grand Falls in 1947. It was a state-of-the-art facility when it opened in the winter of 1948. Equipped with a new arena capable of holding thousands of patrons and generating significant revenues, Grand Falls started hiring 'import' hockey playing-coaches to compete with the Buchans Miners and the strong St. John's teams. The GFAA improved its entry in the race for the Herder Trophy by first hiring Moncton native and NHL Hall of famer Gordie Drillon as playing-coach for the 1948-49 season. Drillon arrived in Grand Falls on November 20, 1948. Two days later the Grand Falls Stadium was officially opened. Joe Byrne was hired as head coach for the 1949-50 season and arrived in Grand Falls in early December 1949. He coached the all-stars for several seasons. Before the start of the 1952-53 season the GFAA hired three playing coaches including PEI native Wes "Bucko" Trainor, who played 17 games with the New York Rangers in 1948-49. In the winter of 1953 Trainor helped Grand Falls capture its first all-Newfoundland championship and Herder Memorial Trophy.

The Grand Falls All-Stars were renamed the Andcos in January 1956. The Andcos won five straight Herder championships from 1955 to 1959 but the hockey club folded at the end of the 1964-65 season. After a year without an entry from the town in the Newfoundland Amateur Hockey Association, the Grand Falls-Cataracts were formed in the fall of 1966.

== Seasons and records ==
=== Season-by-season results ===
Herder Trophy champions‡

Note: GP = Games played, W = Wins, L = Losses, T = Ties, OTL = Overtime Losses, Pts = Points, GF = Goals for, GA = Goals against, DNQ = Did not qualify

NAHA, Sr. = Newfoundland Amateur Hockey Association senior division, NAHA, Sr. A = Newfoundland Amateur Hockey Association senior Section A, NSHL = Newfoundland Senior Hockey League (1962-1989)

Grand Falls All-Stars/Andcos regular season and postseason statistics and results, NAHA Sr. 1947–1962
Season	League	Exhibition games						Herder playoffs							
Season	League	GP	W	L	T	GF	GA	GP	W	L	GF	GA	PTS	Finish	Result
1945–46	NAHA, Sr.	–	–	–	–	–	–	–	–						
1946–47	NAHA, Sr.	–	–	–	–	–	–	–	–						
1947–48	NAHA, Sr.	–	–	–	–	–	–	–	–						lost to Buchans All-Stars in western semi-finals (10-goals-to-4)
1948–49	NAHA, Sr.	–	–	–	–	–	–	–	–						lost to Corner Brook All-Stars in western finals (series forfeited by Grand Falls)
1949–50	NAHA, Sr.	–	–	–	–	–	–	–							lost to Buchans Miners in western semi-finals (26-goals-to-4).
1950–51	NAHA, Sr.	–	–	–	–	–	–	–							lost to Buchans Miners in western semi-finals (16-goals-to-3).
1951–52	NAHA, Sr.	–	–	–	–	–	–	–							lost in western semi-finals to Buchans, 6-28 (TG)
1952–53	NAHA, Sr. A	–	–	–	–	–	–	–							won Herder vs. Buchans Miners, 2-0‡
1953–54	NAHA, Sr. A	–	–	–	–	–	–	–	–						lost in Herder finals to Buchans, 1-2
1954–55	NAHA, Sr. A	–	–	–	–	–	–	–	–						won Herder vs. Buchans Miners, 1-3‡
1955–56	NAHA, Sr. A	–	–	–	–	–	–	–	–						won Herder vs. Buchans Miners, 3-0‡
1956–57	NAHA, Sr. A	–	–	–	–	–	–	–	–						declared the Herder winner by NAHA. (no other teams entered)‡
1957–58	NAHA, Sr. A	–	–	–	–	–	–	–	–						won Herder by defeating Corner Brook Royals, 4-1‡
1958–59	NAHA, Sr. A	–	–	–	–	–	–	–	–						won Herder by defeating Conception Bay CeeBees, 4-1‡
1959–60	NAHA, Sr.	–	–	–	–	–		–	–						lost in Herder finals to Conception Bay CeeBees, 2-4
1960–61	NAHA, Sr.	–	–	–	–	–	–		–						3rd in West, DNQ for Herder playoffs
1961–62	NAHA, Sr.	5	1	2	2	16	27	n/a	–	12	1	11			4th in West, DNQ for Herder finals

Note: There were no regular season games from 1947 through 1962. Teams played exhibition games which was followed by the NAHA playoffs.

Grand Falls Andcos regular season and postseason statistics and results, NSHL 1962–1965
Season	League	Regular season								Herder playoffs					
Season	League	GP	W	L	T	GF	GA	PTS	Finish	GP	W	L	GF	GA	Result
1962–63	NSHL	16	7	3	6	86	72	20	3rd						lost in Herder semi-finals to Buchans Miners, 2-3
1963–64	NSHL	20	6	13	1	85	112	13	5th	–	–	–	–	–	DNQ for Herder playoffs
1964–65	NSHL	20	7	11	2	100	123	16	4th	4	0	4	11	30	lost to Corner Brook Royals in Herder semi-finals (4-games-to-0)

== Leaders ==
=== Captains ===
- Eric Dwyer, 1949–50
- Eddie Walsh, 1950–51
- Dave Green, 1951–53
- Jim McDonald, 1953–54
- Neil Amadio, 1954–55
- Jack Mackenzie, 1955–56
- Orin Carver, 1957–58
- James 'Bucky' Hannaford, 1958–59
- Leo Murphy, 1964–65

=== Head coaches ===
- Gordie Drillon, 1948–49
- Joe Byrne, 1949–52, 1953-54 (replacement), 1961–62
- Wes Trainor, 1952–53, 1955–58
- Alex Robinson, 1953–54
- Neil Amadio, 1954–55
- Ray LaCroix, 1958–59
- Jean-Marc Pichette, 1959–60,1962–63
- James "Bucky" Hannaford, 1960–61
- Jacques LaChesvesque, 1963–64
- Vic Fildes, 1964–65

== Trophies and awards ==
=== Team awards ===
- Six all-Newfoundland senior hockey championships (Herder Memorial Trophy): 1953, 1955, 1956, 1957, 1958, 1959

=== Individual awards ===
Cliff Gorman Memorial Award (Most valuable player of the Herder Playoffs)

== Honoured members ==
=== Retired numbers ===
- #7 Al Dwyer Jr.
- #12 Jim Temple

=== NL Hockey Hall of Fame ===
The following people who were members of the Andcos/All-Stars have been inducted into the Newfoundland and Labrador Hockey Hall of Fame.
Note: (the year of induction is noted)

- George Faulkner (1994)
- Alex Faulkner (1994)
- Joe Byrne (1995)
- Allan Dwyer Jr. (1996)
- Walt Davis (1999)
- Leo Murphy (1999)
- Harold Stanley (2000)
- Jim Temple (2001)
- Clarence Goulding (2008)
- Allan Bargery (2009)
- Cecil Thomas (2018)
