= George Faulkner (ice hockey) =

Canadian ice hockey player (1933–2025)

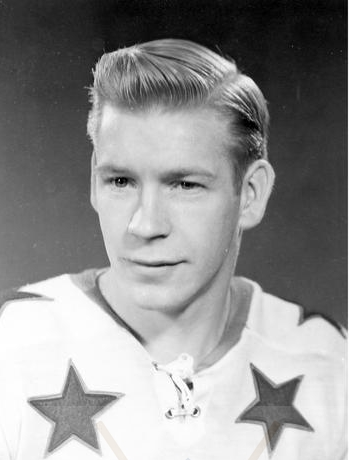
- Shawinigan Cataracts 1955
- Born: December 27, 1933; Bishop's Falls, Newfoundland
- Died: January 19, 2025 (aged 91)
- Height: 5 ft 9 in (175 cm)
- Weight: 156 lb (71 kg; 11 st 2 lb)
- Position: Left wing, defence
- Shot: Left
- Played for: Shawinigan-Falls Cataracts; Jacksonville Rockets
- Playing career: 1950–1975

Robert George Faulkner (December 27, 1933 – January 19, 2025) was a Canadian professional hockey player. In 1954, George became the first professional hockey player from Newfoundland and Labrador when he signed with the minor-pro Shawinigan-Falls Cataracts of the Quebec Senior Hockey League.

== Playing career ==
=== Shawinigan Falls Cataracts ===
In 1954, George became the first player from Newfoundland to sign a professional contract with an NHL team. Faulkner played four seasons with the minor-pro Shawinigan Cataracts from 1954 to 1958. The Cataracts were owned by the Montreal Canadiens of the National Hockey League.

=== Conception Bay CeeBees ===
In 1958, George, at age 24, was hired by the town of Harbour Grace as the community's recreational director. He helped run the hockey program with stadium manager Lorne Wakelin at the new Conception Bay Recreational Centre which opened in January 1958. His first task was to form a senior hockey team. The Conception Bay CeeBees, with George on defense as their playing coach, were immediately a dominant force in the Newfoundland senior league making seven finals appearances in their first nine seasons, including four all-Newfoundland hockey championships.

=== 1966 World Hockey Championships ===
In 1966, at the age of 32 Faulkner won a bronze medal and led Canada's national team in scoring with 6 goals and one assist in 7 games at the World Hockey Championships in Ljubljana, Yugoslavia. He finished 8th in tournament scoring with 7 points and tied for 3rd in goals with 6.

== Personal life ==
George was born in the town of Bishop's Falls on the Exploits River in Newfoundland. His parents were Lester, also born in Bishop's Falls, and Olive who was a native of Point Leamington. Lester's mother (Svea) was born in Burträsk, Sweden and his father (William) was born in Sherbrooke, Guysborough County, Nova Scotia. George had four hockey-playing brothers (Lindy, Seth, Alex, and Jack) and two sisters (Marie and Elizabeth). He first learned how to play hockey on the Exploits River with his brothers. His brother Alex was the first Newfoundlander to play in the National Hockey League. George started his senior hockey career at age 15 playing with the Bishop's Falls Woodsmen in the Grand Falls Senior League. In 1951 he played Junior B with the Quebec Citadelles.

His biography, titled Faulkner: A Hockey History , was published in November 2011. It was written by Tom P. Rossiter, a retired educator.

As of 2016, at the age of 82, he was still skating and sometimes played hockey. In February 2016, he participated in a parents-versus-kids hockey game with his grandson George Faulkner Jr. "I can say now that I've played with my two sons, Bob and Peter, and now I've played with my grandson," he said.

Faulkner married Marjorie "Midge" Florence Vardy, a Registered Nurse formerly of Howley, on April 28, 1956 in Shawinigan. Midge died on October 24, 2010. In April 2023, while in a nursing home, George married Barbara Paddock.

Faulkner died on January 19, 2025, at the age of 91.

== Career achievements ==
=== Championships ===
- 1952: Quebec Junior B Championship with the Quebec Junior B Citadelles.
- 1952: Ottawa District Hockey Association (ODHA)-Quebec Junior B Championship with the Quebec Junior B Citadelles.
- 1953: First all-Newfoundland senior hockey championship and Herder Memorial Trophy with the Grand Falls All-Stars.
- 1955, 1958: Thomas O'Connell Memorial Trophy as Quebec Senior Hockey League champions with the Shawinigan Falls Cataracts.
- 1955: Edinburgh Trophy with the Shawinigan Falls Cataracts. This was an east-west minor-pro hockey series between the champions of the Quebec Hockey League and the Western Hockey League.
- 1960, 1961, 1965, 1967: Herder championship as player-coach with the Conception Bay CeeBees.
- 1975, 1976: Herder championship as Newfoundland provincial senior hockey champions with the St. John's Capitals. He was head coach in 1976.
- 1979: Herder championship as a coach with the St. John's Mike's Shamrocks.

=== Awards and honours ===
- Bronze medal winner with Canada's National Team at the 1966 World Hockey Championships.
- Inducted into the Sport Newfoundland and Labrador Hall of Fame in 1982.
- Inducted into the Newfoundland and Labrador Hockey Hall of Fame in 1994.
- Honoured by the Manitoba Hockey Hall of Fame as a member of Canada's National Team of 1966. Manitoba was home to the National Team from 1965 to 1970.
- Voted Best Newfoundland and Labrador Hockey Player in a 1994 poll by The Telegram.
- Named Top Newfoundland and Labrador Athlete of all time in 1999 by The Telegram.
- Honorary Doctor of Laws Degree from Memorial University of Newfoundland, 2010.
- Torchbearer at the 1992 Newfoundland Summer Games.
- Torchbearer at the 2010 Vancouver Winter Olympics.

== Career statistics ==
Note: GFISL = Grand Falls Inter-town School League, GFSHL = Grand Falls Senior Hockey League, QJBHL = Quebec Junior B Hockey League, NAHA = Newfoundland Amateur Hockey Association, QJAHL = Quebec Junior A Hockey League, QHL = Quebec Hockey League, NSHL = Newfoundland Senior Hockey League

			Regular season									Playoffs
Season	Team	League	GP	G	A	Pts	PIM	+/-	PP	SH	GW	GP	G	A	Pts	PIM
1946–47	Bishop's Falls Station Midgets							—	—	—	—	—	—	—	—	—
1948–49	Bishop's Falls Academy	GFISL						—	—	—	—	—	—	—	—	—
1948–49	Bishop's Falls Woodsmen	GFSHL						—	—	—	—	—	—	—	—	—
1949–50	Bishop's Falls Woodsmen	GFSHL						—	—	—	—	—	—	—	—	—
1950–51	Bishop's Falls Woodsmen	GFSHL	24	8	11	19	0	—	—	—	—	—	—	—	—	—
1950–51	Bishop's Falls Academy	GFISL						—	—	—	—	—	—	—	—	—
1950–51	Grand Falls Junior All-Stars	NAHA-Jr.						—	—	—	—	—	—	—	—	—
1951–52	Quebec 'B' Citadelles	QJBHL						—	—	—	—
1951–52	Bishop's Falls Woodsmen	GFSHL						—	—	—	—	—	—	—	—	—
1952–53	Bishop's Falls Woodsmen	GFSHL	12	27	17	44	—	—	—	—	—	—	—	—	—	—
1952–53	Grand Falls All-Stars	NAHA-Sr.	12	16	11	27	4	—	—	—	—	4	5	4	9	0
1953–54	Quebec Citadelles	QJAHL						—	—	—	—
1953–54	Quebec Frontenacs	QJAHL						—	—	—	—
1954–55	Shawinigan Falls Cataracts	QHL	59	18	25	43		—	—	—	—
1955–56	Shawinigan Falls Cataracts	QHL	52	17	16	33		—	—	—	—	—	—	—	—	—
1956–57	Shawinigan Falls Cataracts	QHL	55	19	26	45		—	—	—	—
1957–58	Shawinigan Falls Cataracts	QHL	51	19	17	36		—	—	—	—	—	—	—	—	—
1958–59	Conception Bay All-Stars	NAHA-Sr.	14	20	13	33		—	—	—	—	—	—	—	—	—
1959–60	Conception Bay CeeBees	NAHA-Sr.	13	11	11	22		—	—	—	—	—	—	—	—	—
1960–61	Conception Bay CeeBees	NAHA-Sr.	10	10	16	26		—	—	—	—	—	—	—	—	—
1961–62	Conception Bay CeeBees	NAHA-Sr.	7	3	6	9		—	—	—	—	—	—	—	—	—
1962–63	Conception Bay CeeBees	NSHL	16	12	14	26		—	—	—	—	—	—	—	—	—
1963–64	Conception Bay CeeBees	NSHL	20	15	24	39		—	—	—	—	—	—	—	—	—
1964–65	Conception Bay CeeBees	NSHL	20	19	45	63		—	—	—	—	—	—	—	—	—
1965–66	Canada's National Team	IIHF	22	11	13	24		—	—	—	—	7	6	2	8	2
1965–66	Conception Bay CeeBees	NSHL						—	—	—	—	—	—	—	—	—
1966–67	Conception Bay CeeBees	NSHL	40	35	46	81		—	—	—	—	—	—	—	—	—
1967–68	Conception Bay CeeBees	NSHL	40	34	35	69		—	—	—	—	—	—	—	—	—
1968–69	Corner Brook Royals	NSHL	38	6	31	37		—	—	—	—	—	—	—	—	—
1969–70	Corner Brook Royals	NSHL	32	14	37	51		—	—	—	—	—	—	—	—	—
1970–71	Did not play senior hockey							—	—	—	—	—	—	—	—	—
1971–72	Jacksonville Rockets	EHL	7	0	0	0	4		—	—	—	—	—	—	—	—
1971–72	St. John's Capitals	NSHL	26	12	23	35	—	—	—	—	—	—	—	—	—	—
1972–73	Gander Flyers	NSHL	33	13	27	40		—	—	—	—	—	—	—	—	—
1973–74	Gander Flyers	NSHL	2	0	1	1		—	—	—	—	—	—	—	—	—
1974–75	St. John's Capitals	NSHL	7	2	11	13		—	—	—	—	—	—	—	—	—
QHL totals			217	73	84	157
NSHL totals (1962-1975)			263	162	293	455	76

== Head coaching record ==
Team	Year	Regular season							Postseason			
Team	Year	G	W	L	T	OTL	Pts	Finish	W	L	Win %	Result
St. John's Capitals	1975-76							1st	4	1	.800	Won league championship (Herder Memorial Trophy)
St. John's Mike's Shamrocks	1978–79							2nd	7	4	.636	Won league championship (Herder Memorial Trophy)
Total											–	2 Herder championships
