= Buchans Miners =

Former senior ice hockey team

- City: Buchans, NL
- League: Central West Senior Hockey League
- Founded: 1929
- Home arena: TA Soper Memorial Stadium
- Colours: Red, white
- General manager: Gus Soper

Franchise history
- 1929–1947: Buchans
- 1948–1955: Buchans All-Stars
- 1956–1978: Buchans Miners

The Buchans Miners were a senior ice hockey team based in Buchans, Newfoundland and Labrador and were a member of the Newfoundland Senior Hockey League. The Miners were awarded the Herder Memorial Trophy seven times as all-Newfoundland senior hockey champions, including three consecutive championships from 1950 to 1952. The club folded in 1970 but came back for one season in the late seventies.

== History ==
The Buchans Miners had its roots in picked teams from the local senior hockey league. Picked teams from Buchans began intertown play as early as 1929 after an ore shed was converted to a rink by the Buchans Mining Company. In 1948, Buchans was the first Newfoundland senior hockey team to hire paid hockey players to improve their roster. These first imports were from Kirkland Lake, Ontario.

The Miners won three straight Herder Championships from 1950 to 1952, again in 1954 and the final championship in 1963.

When the ASARCO Mining Company ended its support after the 1968–69 season, the Miners withdrew from the Newfoundland Senior Hockey League. The Miners reformed for one more season in 1977–78.

== Seasons and records ==
=== Season-by-season results ===
Herder Trophy champions‡

Note: GP = Games played, W = Wins, L = Losses, T = Ties, OTL = Overtime Losses, Pts = Points, GF = Goals for, GA = Goals against, DNQ = Did not qualify

NAHA, Sr. = Newfoundland Amateur Hockey Association senior division, NAHA, Sr. A = Newfoundland Amateur Hockey Association senior Section A, NSHL = Newfoundland Senior Hockey League (1962-1989) |}

Buchans All-Stars/Miners regular season and postseason statistics and results, 1935–1962
Season	League	Exhibition games						Division playoffs							Herder playoffs					
Season	League	GP	W	L	T	GF	GA	GP	W	L	T	GF	GA	Finish	GP	W	L	GF	GA	Result
1935		—	—	—	—	—	—	—	—	—	—	—	—	—	—	—				
1935-36	NAHA	—	—	—	—	—	—	—	—	—	—	—	—	lost to Corner Brook in Western Division finals	—	—				
1936-37	NAHA	—	—	—	—	—	—	—	—	—	—	—	—	Western Division champions	—	—				Lost to St. Bon's in Herder finals, 1-4 (TG)
1937-38	NAHA	—	—	—	—	—	—	—	—	—	—	—	—	lost to Corner Brook in Western Division semifinals, 10-11(TG)	—	—				
1938-39	NAHA	—	—	—	—	—	—	—	—	—	—	—	—	Western Division champions	—	—				
1939-40	NAHA	—	—	—	—	—	—	—	—	—	—	—	—	Western Division champions	—	—				Lost to St. Bon's in Herder finals, 7-17(TG)
1940-41	NAHA	—	—	—	—	—	—	—	—	—	—	—	—	—	—	—				
1941-42	NAHA	—	—	—	—	—	—	—	—	—	—	—	—	—	—	—	—	—	—	Herder playoffs were cancelled due to WWII
1942-43	NAHA	—	—	—	—	—	—	—	—	—	—	—	—	—	—	—	—	—	—	Herder playoffs were cancelled due to WWII
1943-44	NAHA	—	—	—	—	—	—	—	—	—	—	—	—	lost to Corner Brook in Western Division finals, 0-4	—	—				
1944-45	NAHA	—	—	—	—	—	—	—	—	—	—	—	—	—	—	—	—	—	—	—
1945-46	NAHA	—	—	—	—	—	—	—	—	—	—	—	—	—	—	—				
1946-47	NAHA	—	—	—	—	—	—	—	—	—	—	—	—	—	—	—				
1947–48	NAHA, Sr.	–	–	–	–	–	–	–	–		–	–	–	–	–					lost to St. Bon's in Herder finals, 3-6(TG)
1948–49	NAHA, Sr.	–	–	–	–	–	–	–	–		–	–	–	–	–					
1949–50	NAHA, Sr.	–	–	–	–	–	–	–	–		–	–	– –	–		–				won Herder vs. St. Bon's, 17-5(TG)‡
1950–51	NAHA, Sr.	–	–	–		–	–	–	–	–	–		–	–						won Herder vs. St. Bon's, 12-6(TG)‡
1951–52	NAHA, Sr.	–		–	–	–	–	–	–			–	–	–						won Herder vs. St. Bon's, 12-3(TG)‡
1952–53	NAHA, Sr. A	–	–		–	–	–	–	–	–	–	–	–	– –						lost to Grand Falls All-Stars in Herder finals, 0-2
1953–54	NAHA, Sr. A		–	–	–	–	–	– –	–	–	–	–			–					won Herder vs. Grand Falls All-Stars, 2-1‡
1954–55	NAHA, Sr. A		–	–	–	–	–	– –	–	–	–	–								lost to Grand Falls All-Stars in Herder finals, 1-3
1955–56	NAHA, Sr. A	–	–	–	–	–	–		–	–	–	–	–	–	–					lost to Grand Falls All-Stars in Herder finals, 0-3
1956–57	NAHA, Sr. A		–	–	–	–	–	–	–	–	–		–	–	–	–	–			
1957–58	NAHA, Sr. A		–	–	–	–	–	–	–	–	–		–	–	–	–	–			
1958–59	NAHA, Sr. A		–	–	–	–	–	–	–	–	–		–	–	–	–	–			
1959–60	NAHA, Sr.		–	–	–	–	–	–	–	–		–	–	–	–	–				
1960–61	NAHA, Sr.		–	–	–	–	–	–	–	–		–	–	–	–	–				
1961–62	NAHA, Sr.		–	–	–	–	–	–	–	–		–	–	–	–	–				

Note: There were no regular season games from 1947 through 1962. Teams played exhibition games, followed by division playoffs and the Herder playoffs.

Buchans Miners regular season and postseason statistics and results, NSHL 1962–1970
Season	League	Regular season								Herder playoffs					
Season	League	GP	W	L	T	PTS	Finish	GF	GA	GP	W	L	GF	GA	Result
1962–63	NSHL	16	9	5	2	20	1st	99	72						won Herder vs. Corner Brook Royals, 4-2‡
1963–64	NSHL														lost to Corner Brook Royals in Herder finals, 2-4
1964–65	NSHL														
1965–66	NSHL														
1966–65	NSHL														
1967–68	NSHL														lost to Corner Brook Royals in Herder finals,
1968–69	NSHL														lost to Gander Flyers in Herder finals, 0-4
1969–70	NSHL														

Notes (1962-1970): Buchans was the winner of a 3-team playoff with Conception Bay and Grand Falls to decide first place as a result of a 3-way first place tie after the regular season

== Leaders ==
=== Captains ===
- Phil "Scotty" MacPhail
- Bill Scott
- Hugh Wadden

=== Head coaches ===
- Frank Bowman
- Hugh Wadden

== Trophies and awards ==
=== Team awards ===
- Five all-Newfoundland senior hockey championships (Herder Memorial Trophy): 1950, 1951, 1952, 1954, 1963

== Honoured members ==
=== NL Hockey Hall of Fame ===
The following people who were members of the Miners have been inducted into the Newfoundland and Labrador Hockey Hall of Fame.
Note: the year of induction into NLHHOF is noted

- Thomas Augustus (Gus) Soper (1995)
- William (Bill) Scott (1995)
- Hugh Wadden (1995)
- Frank Walker (1996)
- Mike Kelly (1999)
- James Hornell, Sr (2012)
