= Estrie-Mauricie Junior AA Hockey League =

Canadian ice hockey league

- Sport: Ice hockey
- President: Marcel Lavoie
- No. of teams: 8
- Countries: Canada
- Headquarters: Sherbrooke, Quebec
- Most recent champion: Cowansville Nordik

The Estrie-Mauricie Junior AA Hockey League is a Canadian junior ice hockey league in the Estrie and Mauricie Regions of Quebec. The league is sanctioned by Hockey Quebec and Hockey Canada and its winner competes annually for the Coupe Dodge.

== History ==
In 2008-09 and 2009–10, the EMJAAHL became just the Estrie Junior AA Hockey League as Mauricie did not enter any teams to play.

In 2010-11, the Estrie League played a joint season with Richelieu Junior AA Hockey League to increase the field of play. Mauricie returned to the fold in 2011-12 and the EMJAAHL was restored.

=== 2006 Coupe Dodge ===
The Plessisville V. Boutin were 2006 Estrie-Mauricie playoff champions. With their victory, the V. Boutin gained entry into the Coupe Dodge tournament in Gatineau, Quebec. In the preliminary round, Plessisville defeated the Delta Ducs 4-2 and the Jonquiere Marquis 4-3. In the elimination round, Plessisville began by defeating the Suroit Express 3-2 in overtime. In the quarter-final, they defeated the West Island Royals 4-2 and in the semi-final they beat the Trois-Pistoles Rebels 9-0. Their wins set them up for a rematch against Jonquiere for the Quebec Junior AA Crown. The game would go into overtime, but Plessisville V. Boutin would win 1-0 in the extra frame to take home the Coupe Dodge.

=== 2010 Coupe Dodge ===
Windsor Momo Sports Excellence would win the 2010 Estrie-Mauricie title and gain entry into the Coupe Dodge tournament in the rival town of Plessisville, Quebec. They would begin the provincial championship by defeating La Baie Nationals 6-0. They then beat Rivere-du-Loop CIEL FM 3-1. In the elimination they defeated the Suroit Express 6-4 and then the Beauport Harfangs 6-5 in the quarter-final. In the semi-final, Windsor beat the Montreal-Nord Nordiques 5-1 and then beat the Lorraine-Rosemere Nationals in the finals by the same score to clinch the Coupe Dodge as Quebec Junior AA Champions.

=== 2015-2016 ===
The Estrie-Mauricie league has decided to suspend its activities for at least one season after the organization of the "Hockey Experts de Sherbrooke" has announced that the team will not be back in 2016-2017. The organizers of the Laurentides-Lanaudière Junior AA Hockey League have agreed to welcome Pétroles Propane A.A. Courchesne de Nicolet, les Draveurs Trois-Rivières and les Braves de Farnham. Plessiville de V Boutin is playing in the Chaudiere-Appalaches Junior AA Hockey League this season.

== Teams ==
Estrie Division
Team	Centre
Acton Vale Airboss	Acton, Quebec
Cowansville Nordik	Cowansville, Quebec
Sherbrooke Hockey Experts	Sherbrooke, Quebec
Sherbrooke Impact	Sherbrooke, Quebec
Mauricie Division
Team	Centre
Nicolet Pneu Jutras	Nicolet, Quebec
Plessisville V. Boutin	Plessisville, Quebec
St-Tite Mustangs	Saint-Tite, Quebec
Trois-Rivieres Draveurs	Trois-Rivieres, Quebec

== Playoff Champions ==
Bolded are Coupe Dodge provincial champions.

2006 Plessisville V. Boutin
2007 Windsor Sport Wellington
2008 Coaticook Frontaliers
2009 St-Cyrille Cyclones
2010 Windsor Momo Sports Excellence
2011 Plessisville V. Boutin
2012 Sherbrooke-Ouest Hockey Experts
2013 St-Tite Mustangs
2014 Cowansville Nordik
2015 Plessisville V. Boutin
2016 Plessisville V. Boutin (E)/Trois-Rivieres Draveurs (M)
