= Canadian Amateur Hockey Association =

Ice hockey governing body

- Abbreviation: CAHA
- Merged into: Hockey Canada
- Formation: December 4, 1914
- Founded at: Ottawa, Ontario, Canada
- Dissolved: 1994

The Canadian Amateur Hockey Association (CAHA; French: Association canadienne de hockey amateur) was the national governing body of amateur ice hockey in Canada from 1914 until 1994, when it merged with Hockey Canada. Its jurisdiction included senior ice hockey leagues and the Allan Cup, junior ice hockey leagues and the Memorial Cup, amateur minor ice hockey leagues in Canada, and choosing the representative of the Canada men's national ice hockey team.

== History ==
The Allan Cup trophy

The Canadian Amateur Hockey Association (CAHA) was formed on December 4, 1914, at the Château Laurier hotel in Ottawa. The desire to set up a national body for hockey came from the Allan Cup trustees who were unable to keep up with organizing its annual challenges. The Allan Cup then became recognized as the annual championship for amateur senior ice hockey in Canada. In 1919, the CAHA became trustees of the Memorial Cup, awarded as the annual championship for junior ice hockey in Canada.

The CAHA negotiated an agreement with the National Hockey League (NHL) in 1940, which recognized junior hockey in Canada as a source of talent for the NHL and provided financial compensation to the CAHA for developing amateur players who were signed to professional contracts. The agreement included allowing the NHL to sign a limited number of junior age players and began a regulated relationship between amateur and professional hockey.

The CAHA filled the role of selecting the Canada men's national ice hockey team to represent the country in ice hockey at the Olympic Games and at the Ice Hockey World Championships. From 1920 until 1963, the CAHA usually chose the reigning Allan Cup champion to represent the country. For the 1964 Winter Olympics, the CAHA approved a proposal by Father David Bauer which established a permanent national men's team composed of student athletes reinforced with senior hockey players.

Hockey Canada was formed in 1969 to operate the national team and oversee Canada's involvement in international competition. The CAHA and Hockey Canada had a troubled relationship since a clear definition of responsibilities was never established, and the CAHA's authority over amateur hockey in Canada and its membership within the International Ice Hockey Federation were questioned. In 1994, CAHA president Murray Costello and Hockey Canada president Bill Hay, negotiated a merger between the two organizations. Originally called the Canadian Hockey Association, it has operated as Hockey Canada since 1998. Combining the two organizations allowed for the profits from the Canada Cup and the Summit Series to be invested into minor ice hockey in Canada, and also allowed professionals into international competition at the World Championships and eventually the Olympics.

== Member branches ==
List of CAHA member branches from 1914 to 1994:

Association	Acronym	Admission	Departure	Jurisdiction
Alberta Amateur Hockey Association	AAHA	1914	—	Alberta, Northwest Territories
Manitoba Amateur Hockey Association	MAHA	1914	—	Manitoba
Ontario Hockey Association	OHA	1914	—	All of Ontario not under the jurisdiction of the TBAHA or ODHA; Included an affiliation with the Northern Ontario Hockey Association
Saskatchewan Amateur Hockey Association	SAHA	1914	—	Saskatchewan
Thunder Bay Amateur Hockey Association	TBAHA	1915	—	Northern Ontario west of the 85th meridian
British Columbia Amateur Hockey Association	BCAHA	1919	—	British Columbia, Yukon
Quebec Amateur Hockey Association	QAHA	1919	—	All of Quebec not under the jurisdiction of the ODHA
Ottawa District Hockey Association	ODHA	1920	—	Eastern Ontario and the National Capital Region: Lanark County; Renfrew County; Leeds and Grenville United Counties excluding Gananoque; Pontiac Regional County Municipality; Gatineau; Papineau Regional County Municipality
Maritime Amateur Hockey Association	—	1928	1974	New Brunswick (until 1968), Nova Scotia, Prince Edward Island
Newfoundland Amateur Hockey Association	NAHA	1966	—	Newfoundland and Labrador
New Brunswick Amateur Hockey Association	NBAHA	1968	—	New Brunswick
Nova Scotia Hockey Association	NSHA	1974	—	Nova Scotia
Prince Edward Island Hockey Association	PEIHA	1974	—	Prince Edward Island

== Executive personnel ==
=== Presidents ===
List of CAHA presidents from 1914 to 1994:

- 1914–1915, W. F. Taylor
- 1915–1919, James T. Sutherland
- 1916–1918, J. F. Paxton (acting president)
- 1919–1920, Frederick E. Betts
- 1920–1921, H. J. Sterling
- 1921–1922, W. R. Granger
- 1922–1924, Toby Sexsmith
- 1924–1926, Silver Quilty
- 1926–1928, Frank Sandercock
- 1928–1930, W. A. Fry
- 1930–1932, Jack Hamilton
- 1932–1934, Frank Greenleaf
- 1934–1936, E. A. Gilroy
- 1936–1938, Cecil Duncan
- 1938–1940, W. G. Hardy
- 1940–1942, George Dudley
- 1942–1945, Frank Sargent
- 1945–1947, Hanson Dowell
- 1947–1950, Al Pickard
- 1950–1952, Doug Grimston
- 1952–1955, W. B. George
- 1955–1957, Jimmy Dunn
- 1957–1959, Robert Lebel
- 1959–1960, Gordon Juckes
- 1960–1962, Jack Roxburgh
- 1962–1964, Art Potter
- 1964–1966, Lionel Fleury
- 1966–1968, Fred Page
- 1968, Lloyd Pollock
- 1969–1971, Earl Dawson
- 1971–1973, Joe Kryczka
- 1973–1975, Jack Devine
- 1975–1977, Don Johnson
- 1977–1979, Gord Renwick
- 1979–1994, Murray Costello

=== Vice-presidents ===
List of notable CAHA vice-presidents who did not serve as president:

- Francis Nelson (1914–1915)
- Norman Dawe (1945–1948)
- Frank McKinnon (1975–1979)

=== Administrators ===
List of CAHA administrators from 1914 to 1979:

- Claude C. Robinson – secretary-treasurer (1914–1915)
- W. A. Hewitt – secretary-treasurer (1915–1919), registrar (1921–1925), registrar-treasurer (1925–1961)
- W. C. Bettschen – secretary-treasurer (1919–1920)
- H. E. James – secretary-treasurer (1920–1921)
- W. J. Morrison – secretary-treasurer (1921–1922)
- R. C. Chambers – Amateur Athletic Union of Canada governor (1922–1928)
- Fred Marples – secretary-treasurer (1922–1924), secretary (1926–1945)
- Dave Gill – secretary-treasurer (1924–1925)
- Jack Dunn – secretary (1925–1926)
- George Dudley – secretary (1945–1947), secretary-manager (1947–1960)
- Gordon Juckes – secretary-manager (1960–1961), registrar-treasurer and secretary-manager (1961–1968), executive director (1968–1977)
- David Branch – executive director (1977–1979)

== Award recipients ==
=== Order of Merit ===
The CAHA agreed to establish an Order of Merit at the 1960 general meeting, to recognize an individual who "made outstanding contributions to Canadian amateur hockey". The first groups of recipients were named in January and May 1962.

List of notable recipients of the Order of Merit:

- 1962, Hanson Dowell
- 1963, Frank Sargent, Frank Dilio
- 1964, George Panter
- 1965, Frank Buckland
- 1966, Art Potter, W. B. George
- 1967, Jack Hamilton
- 1969, W. G. Hardy
- 1971, Jack Roxburgh
- 1973, Matt Leyden
- 1975, Bill Hanley
- 1976, Gordon Juckes
- 1979, Tubby Schmalz
- 1984, Paul Dumont
- 1986, Ed Chynoweth
- 1990, Leo Margolis
- 1990, Joseph R. Byrne, Bob Nadin
- 1991, Frank McKinnon
- 1994, Fran Rider

=== Gordon Juckes Award ===
The CAHA established the Gordon Juckes Award in 1981, to recognize an individual for outstanding contribution to the development of amateur hockey at the national level in Canada.

List of recipients of the Gordon Juckes Award:

- 1981, Frank McKinnon
- 1982, Joseph R. Byrne
- 1983, Bob Hindmarch
- 1984, Tom Pashby
- 1985, Dave King
- 1986, Georges Larivière
- 1987, Dave Siciliano
- 1988, Dale Henwood
- 1989, Dennis McDonald
- 1990, Vern Frizzell
- 1991, Clare Drake
- 1992, Gaston Marcotte
- 1993, Colin Patterson
- 1994, Howie Wenger

== Bibliography ==
- McKinley, Michael (2014). It's Our Game: Celebrating 100 Years Of Hockey Canada. Toronto, Ontario: Viking Press. ISBN 978-0-670-06817-3.
- Constitution, By-laws, Regulations, History. Gloucester, Ontario: Canadian Amateur Hockey Association. May 1990.
