= Bishop's Falls =

- Town
- Seal
- Motto: "In Media Silva Maneo" (Latin) "In the center of the forest, I remain"
- Location of Bishop's Falls in Newfoundland
- Coordinates: 49°01′00″N 55°31′00″W
- Country: Canada
- Province: Newfoundland and Labrador
- Census division: 6

Government
  - Mayor: Bryan King
  - MP: Clifford Small (CPC)

Area
  - Land: 28.12 km^{2} (10.86 sq mi)

Population (2021)
  - Total: 3,082
  - Density: 112.2/km^{2} (291/sq mi)
- Time zone: UTC-3:30 (Newfoundland Time)
  - Summer (DST): UTC-2:30 (Newfoundland Daylight)
- Area code: 709
- Highways: Route 1 (TCH); Route 350

Bishop's Falls is a town in the north-central part of the island of Newfoundland in the Canadian province of Newfoundland and Labrador, with a population of 3,082 at the 2021 census.

== Geography ==
It is in Division No. 6, on the Exploits River, near the town of Grand Falls-Windsor and the town of Botwood. It is commonly thought of as having the warmest summer temperatures in all of Newfoundland and Labrador.

== History ==
The railroad played a major part in the area's history, as the town was a central hub during the travels of the "Newfie Bullet" train. There is a trestle in the town that is the longest east of Quebec. The existing trestle is the last of many that were built and destroyed by the strong ice flows (and a flood) that occur in the winter. The town sits along the Exploits River, which flows through and to the falls from which the town takes its name.

== Demographics ==
In the 2021 Census of Population conducted by Statistics Canada, Bishop's Falls had a population of 3,082 living in 1,422 of its 1,540 total private dwellings, a change of −2.3% from its 2016 population of 3,156. With a land area of 26.38 km^{2} (10.19 sq mi), it had a population density of 116.8/km^{2} (302.6/sq mi) in 2021.

	North: Division No. 6, Subd. C
West: Division No. 6, Subd. C	Bishop's Falls	East: Division No. 6, Subd. D
	South: Division No. 6, Subd. C

== Notable people ==
- Alex Faulkner, first National Hockey League player from Newfoundland and Labrador, shared the ice with Gordie Howe.
- George Faulkner, first professional hockey player from Newfoundland and Labrador (minor-pro)
- Scott Simms, MP, former Member of Parliament and former Weather Network broadcaster

== See also ==
- List of cities and towns in Newfoundland and Labrador
