= Lac St-Louis Junior AA Hockey League =

Former Ice hockey league in Quebec, Canada

- Most recent season or competition: 2017-2018
- Sport: Ice hockey
- Replaced by: Joined LHMJAA 2018
- No. of teams: 2
- Countries: Canada
- Headquarters: Island of Montreal
- Most recent champion: Versant Ouest Phoenix

The Ligue de Hockey Junior AA Lac St-Louis (Lac Saint-Louis Junior AA Hockey League) was a Junior "AA" (Junior "B" Canada-wide) ice hockey league in the province of Quebec, Canada. The league was sanctioned by Hockey Quebec and Hockey Canada.

Since 2018-2019 the surviving LSL teams have competed in the Ligue Hockey Metropolitaine Junior AA (LHMJAA). Two teams remain: the Dollard-des-Ormeaux Vipers and Vaudreuil Mustangs (Trois-Lacs Aigles).

The league champion competes for the Coupe Dodge, the annual Junior AA championship in Quebec.

== Teams ==
Team	Centre
Pierrefonds Barracudas	Pierrefonds, Quebec
Dollard-des-Ormeaux Vipers	Dollard-des-Ormeaux, Quebec
Lakeshore Panthers	Kirkland, Quebec
Trois-Lacs Aigles	Vaudreuil, Quebec
Trois Cités Phoenix	Ville Saint-Laurent, Quebec
West Island Royals	Dorval, Quebec
Beauval Étoiles	Valleyfield, Quebec

== Champions ==
Bold indicates a LSL Regional winner.

- 2006 West Island Royals
- 2007 West Island Royals
- 2008 Deux-Rives Dauphins
- 2009 West Island Royals
- 2010 Suroit Express
- 2011 **Suroit Express**
- 2012 West Island Royals
- 2013 Lakeshore Panthers
- 2014 Lakeshore Panthers
- 2015 Versant Ouest Phoenix
- 2016 Versant Ouest Phoenix
- 2017 Pierrefonds Barracudas
- 2018 Trois-Cites Phoenix
- 2019 Saint-Laurent Phoenix
