= Frank Greenleaf =

Canadian sports administrator (1877–1953)

- Born: May 22, 1877; Montreal, Quebec, Canada
- Died: January 1, 1953 (aged 75); Montreal, Quebec, Canada
- Resting place: Mount Royal Cemetery
- Known for: Canadian Amateur Hockey Association and Quebec Amateur Hockey Association president

Frank Chapin Greenleaf (May 22, 1877 – January 1, 1953) was a Canadian sports administrator. He served as president of the Canadian Amateur Hockey Association and the Quebec Amateur Hockey Association, and was an executive in the Quebec branch of the Amateur Athletic Union of Canada. He presided over amateur hockey when the Canadian Amateur Hockey Association wanted to end the raiding of its rosters by foreign teams and to prevent a geographic shift in talent by imposing a residency rule for players. Greenleaf negotiated for a North American senior ice hockey championship that saw the Allan Cup winner play the amateur champion of the United States. He served as an executive member of multiple amateur hockey leagues in Montreal and was one of the founders of the Mount Royal Junior Hockey League.

== Early sporting career ==
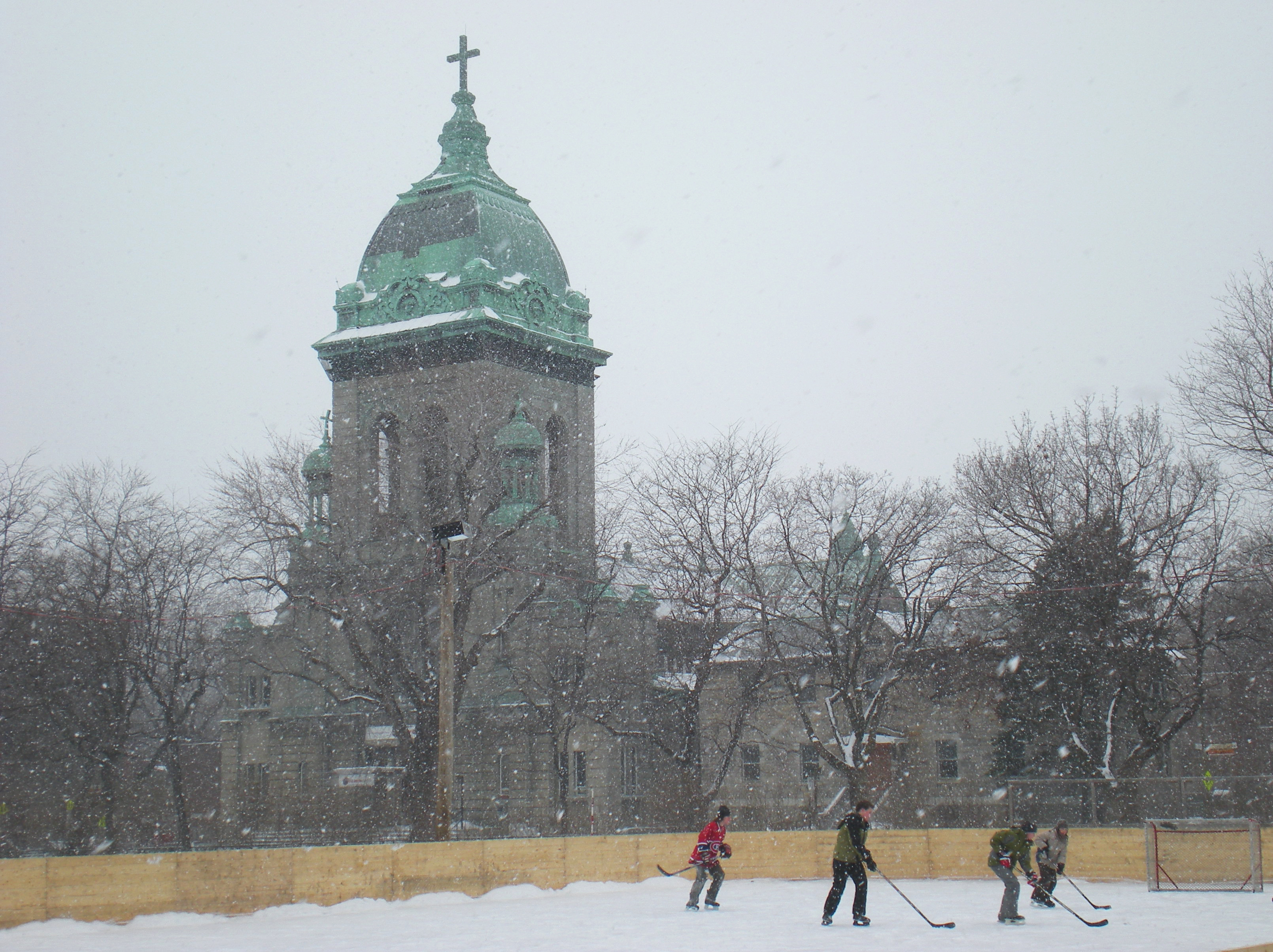
An outdoor ice hockey rink in Notre-Dame-de-Grâce Park

Frank Chapin Greenleaf was born in Montreal on May 22, 1877, the son of Calvin Theophilus Greenleaf and Mary Etta Chapin who had both immigrated from the United States. Greenleaf was associated with ice hockey, baseball, and lacrosse in his early years. He married Florence Silverson in 1902, with whom he raised three sons and two daughters. In 1911, he was employed as a cutter and resided in the Notre-Dame-de-Grâce neighbourhood.

Greenleaf was president of the Montreal Independent Hockey League for six years from 1917 to 1923. The league changed its name from the Art Ross Hockey League in 1920, to become eligible for affiliation with the Quebec Amateur Hockey Association (QAHA) and to participate in the newly established provincial playoffs. He also served as president of the Kensington Hockey Club in Notre-Dame-de-Grâce in the early 1920s. He was named an honorary president of the league when he declined re-election in 1923.

Greenleaf was also involved in operating baseball leagues based in Montreal. He served as both vice-president and president of the City and District Baseball League from 1922 to 1925, and was president of the Montreal City Amateur Softball League based at Atwater Park in 1927.

== Quebec Amateur Hockey Association ==
Greenleaf was named to the QAHA registration committee in April 1924, when its constitution was being revised to have teams register directly with the association instead of via the leagues. He supervised all applications for registration for hockey in Quebec when it became mandatory for players to have an Amateur Athletic Union of Canada (AAU of C) registrant card, and regularly attended AAU of C meetings. He chaired the meeting which founded the Western Intermediate Hockey League in December 1926, and was named an honorary patron of the league based at Loyola College in Notre-Dame-de-Grâce.

Greenleaf was unanimously elected to succeed Leo Burns as president of the QAHA in April 1927. He appointed a special committee to revise the constitution and by-laws to resolve a lack of clarity that had resulted recurring petty differences. Greenleaf chaired a meeting requested by the leagues to discuss a "one-man, one-league" regulation. QAHA by-laws at the time allowed for a person to play for a team operated by his employer and one other recreational team. The leagues felt that players were fatigued, and agreed that by limiting a player to one team and playing fewer games it would increase the overall quality of hockey and subsequently improve the QAHA's results in the Allan Cup playoffs for the national senior ice hockey championship of Canada. The leagues were also concerned about increasing competition for players by commercial leagues, and Greenleaf issued a warning that anyone who played on teams outside of its jurisdiction would be ineligible for QAHA or Allan Cup games.

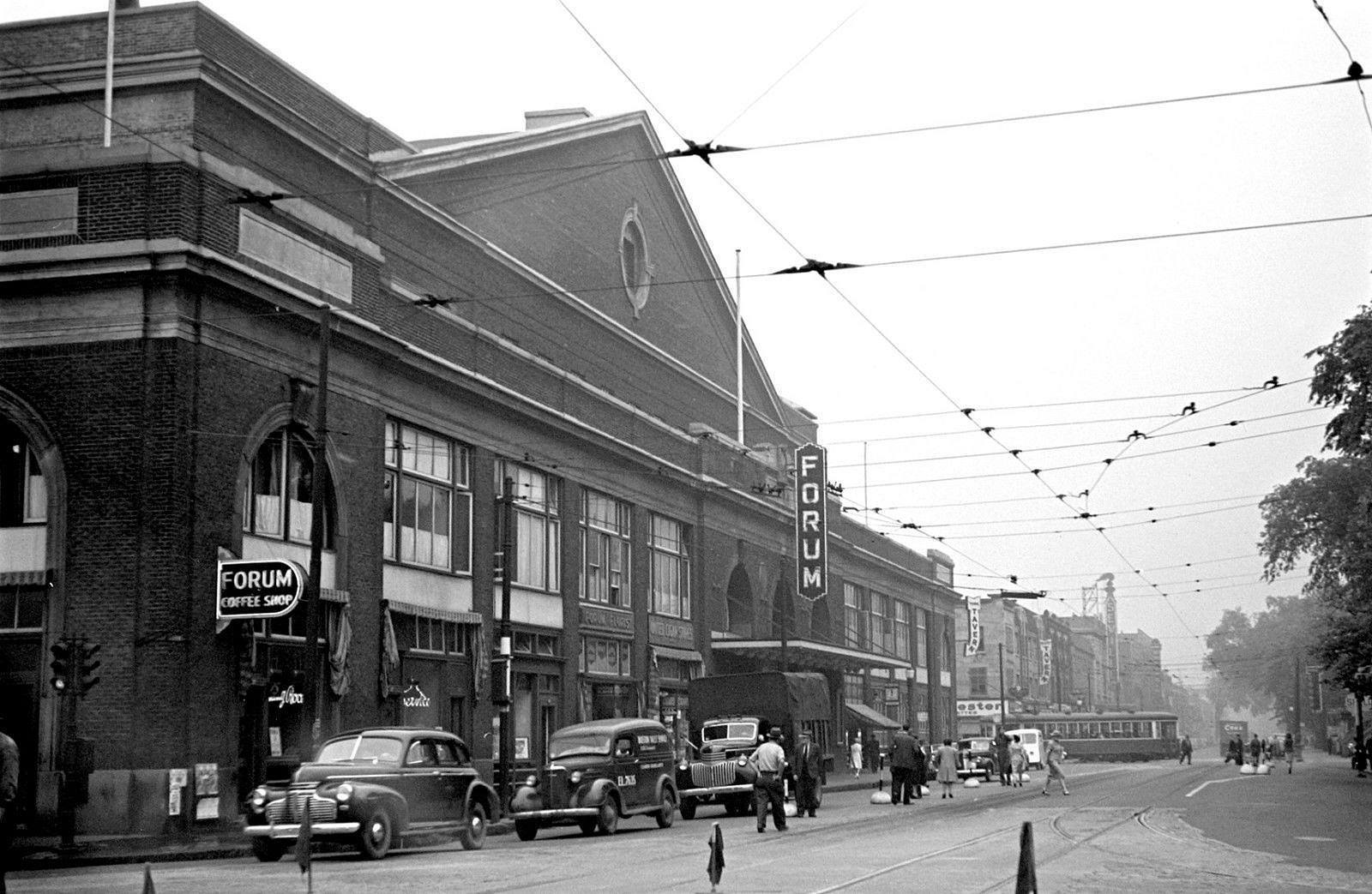
The Montreal Forum c. 1945

Greenleaf was one of the founders of the Mount Royal Junior Hockey League in 1928, which created a venue for junior ice hockey talent to develop and be regularly featured on Saturday afternoons at the Montreal Forum. He also facilitated the revival of the local church hockey league which had folded in 1920. A six-team league was formed in 1928, and Greenleaf agreed to donate a trophy awarded to the season's most valuable player.

Discussions arose over the number of teams which should be admitted to a league's playoffs in 1929. Greenleaf ruled that each league could choose its own format as long as the deadline to declare a champion was met. He also instructed all leagues to implemented consistent ice hockey rules as used in the rest of Canada. He declined re-election in April 1930 after three years as president, although he returned to the executive committee a year later following a high turnover of executives.

== Canadian Amateur Hockey Association ==
=== Vice-president ===
Greenleaf served two years as first vice-president of the Canadian Amateur Hockey Association (CAHA) from March 1930 until April 1932, and oversaw playoffs in Eastern Canada both years for junior and senior hockey. In 1931, the CAHA began selecting the final venue for the Allan Cup and the Memorial Cup championships a year in advance, instead of deciding only one month in advance. He brought forth a proposal from the QAHA to allow the forward pass in the centre ice area instead of an offside infraction stopping the play. The change was declined and sent to the provincial branches for further discussion.

In December 1930, the CAHA was faced with the new situation of players returning from professional tryouts without signing a contract, and wanting to playing amateur hockey and obtain an AAU of C registration card. The AAU of C had a policy which stipulated that any player who had tried out for a professional team would be classified a professional and ineligible for amateur play. Since the policy had not been enforced before, the CAHA cancelled those players' cards without penalty to the team. In an effort to combat growing professionalism in hockey, the CAHA asked to swear an oath during the playoffs that they were indeed amateurs. The CAHA also declined to allow teams to play against professionals in any competition, including exhibition games.

The Canadian Olympic Committee named Greenleaf to its winter sports committee to prepare for the upcoming Winter Olympics, and he served as a technical advisor to the organizing committee for ice hockey at the 1932 Winter Olympics.

=== President ===
==== First term ====
The Allan Cup was the championship trophy for amateur senior ice hockey overseen by the CAHA.

Greenleaf was elected CAHA president to succeed Jack Hamilton in April 1932. At the same, the CAHA approved teams to go on exhibition tours in Europe with the co-operation of the British Ice Hockey Association. The CAHA wanted to reduce the number of players migrating between countries for hockey, and set a registration deadline of January 1. Greenleaf warned that players who migrated from Canada to the United States for hockey, would be ineligible to register with the CAHA for one year after the deadline.

In January 1933, Greenleaf forbade any CAHA team from playing against the Atlantic City Seagulls, in response to the raiding of rosters in Canada and importing players to Atlantic City by offers of employment. The AAU of C promised to investigate and possibly cancel the players' registration cards due to hockey "tourism". The Amateur Athletic Union of the United States defended the players by stating that they worked for hotels in Atlantic City and could play there legitimately. In response to the ban on the Seagulls, American teams refused to play exhibition games with any Canadian teams. Greenleaf felt that the American boycott was "the finest thing that ever happened", and that the CAHA would not suffer. He then suspended all Canadians playing in the United States who had not returned to Canada by the January 1 deadline.

Greenleaf scheduled the 1933 Allan Cup semifinals in Montreal, and the Maritime Amateur Hockey Association declined to travel since the association felt it broke an agreement to alternate hosting of the semifinals. Greenleaf felt it was more economical for a team in the Maritimes to stop in Montreal on route to the finals in Vancouver, whereas the Maritimes' champion wanted to play on home ice where ticket sales were more profitable. Greenleaf acquiesced and the QAHA champion travelled to the Maritimes.

==== Second term ====
Greenleaf was re-elected president in April 1933. At the 1933 general meeting, the CAHA debated using the same playing rules as the National Hockey League (NHL), and adopted the forward pass in all zones on the ice to reduce the number of stoppages in the game. Greenleaf enforced the residence rule as adopted at the general meeting in 1932, and suspended all player for the upcoming season who had who moved from one CAHA branch to another since January 1. The rule was implemented to prevent a geographic shift in talent, but exceptions were allowed due to employment, a junior-aged player moving with his parents, or students who established residence while attending school. By extension of the residence rule, Greenleaf determined that any amateur playing hockey in Europe on their own initiative, could not be reinstated until the following CAHA season.

In September 1933, Greenleaf announced the end of the ban against the Seagulls and resumption of exhibition games versus Canadian teams. In January 1934, he proposed for the Allan Cup winner to play the American amateur champion in a post-season title for North America. He asked CAHA branches to mail-in their votes on the proposal and travelled to the United States to discuss the plans. An agreement was reached where an all-American team met the Allan Cup winners, and any Canadian seasonally playing on an American-based team would be ineligible for the series. Greenleaf announced successful negotiations, and stated that the international championship would be a two-year experiment in a best-of-three format. The Moncton Hawks won the international series in 1934, and Greenleaf stated the team was entitled to the Hamilton B. Wills Trophy, but that it had become lost somewhere in the United States.

At the 1934 general meeting, Greenleaf opposed a motion by the Ontario Hockey Association to allow commercial hockey teams in Allan Cup playoffs. The CAHA voted against the proposal, and approved roster replacements for teams who had lost players signed to professional contracts. Greenleaf was succeeded by E. A. Gilroy as president in April 1934.

=== Past-president ===
Greenleaf was named to the CAHA registration committee in November 1934, and given the task of deciding on applications for transfers between branches of the CAHA. He submitted a resolution at the 1935 CAHA general meeting, to decline permission for amateurs to try out with professional teams after December 1. The CAHA agreed on the concept of a deadline but felt that more discussion was needed and did not approve the resolution.

The Halifax Wolverines who were 1935 Allan Cup champions, had lost players after the team had been chosen to represent Canada in ice hockey at the 1936 Winter Olympics and were unsure if they could play. Greenleaf suggested a playoff between the Port Arthur Bearcats who were Allan Cup finalists, and the Montreal Royals who were the Eastern Canada finalists. He advocated for sending the best possible team to the Olympics and felt that the Royals were stronger, since their playoffs series against Halifax required more games for a decision. E. A. Gilroy replied that the decision to send the Bearcats was final, and that if the Royals were considered, then the other semi-finalists also would have deserved consideration. Greenleaf oversaw scheduling for the 1936 Allan Cup and the 1936 Memorial Cup, while Gilroy was overseas at the Olympics.

== Amateur Athletic Union in Quebec ==
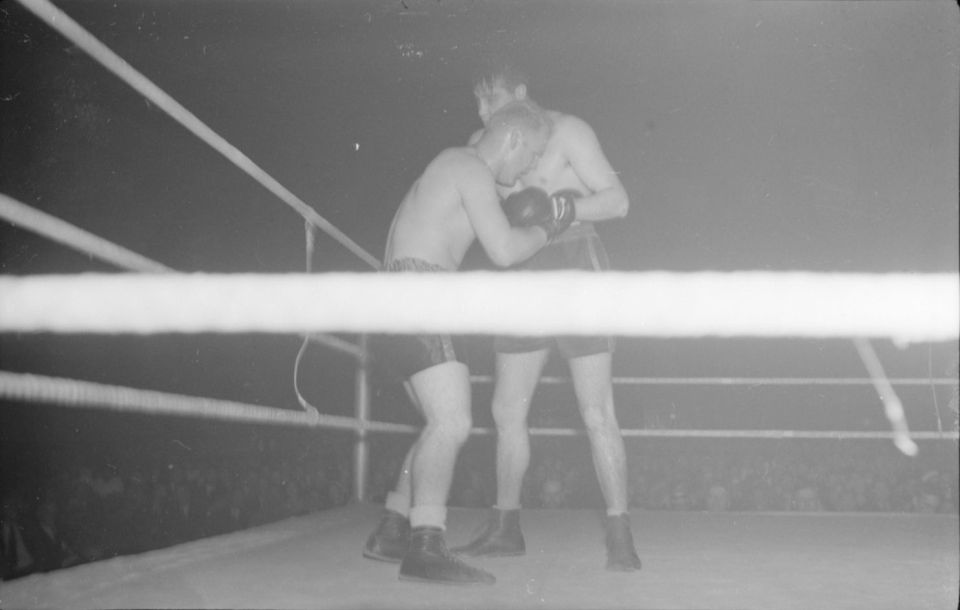
Boxing in Montreal c. 1937

In November 1928, Greenleaf began serving two years as first vice-president of the Quebec branch of the AAU of C. The branch expanded its membership during this time by adding the Quebec Amateur Fencing Association, and sought to begin a national organization for baseball in Canada. The branch supported the virtues of pure amateurism and distributed the Canadian Athlete newsletter to its members, a monthly house organ for the AAU of C.

Greenleaf was a boxing judge at events in Montreal, became president of the registration committee for the Quebec branch of the AAU of C in July 1936, and held the position for the remainder of his life. He was a regular delegate to national meetings of the AAU of C and sought to increase participation in amateur athletics in Quebec.

== Later sporting career ==
Greenleaf returned to serving on the executive committees of hockey leagues in Montreal. He was vice-president of the Montreal Intermediate Hockey League from 1935 to 1940, and arranged international exhibition games with teams in the Eastern Amateur Hockey League in the United States. He was also a member of the Mount Royal Junior Hockey League executive from the late 1930s until the late 1940s. He donated the Frank Greenleaf Trophy, awarded to the playoffs champion of the City and District Intermediate Hockey League in Montreal.

Greenleaf designed a new style of hockey net in 1937. It was made in a large U-shape with three parallel pockets in the mesh, which made it easier to judge a goal being scored by preventing the hockey puck from rebounding out of the net.

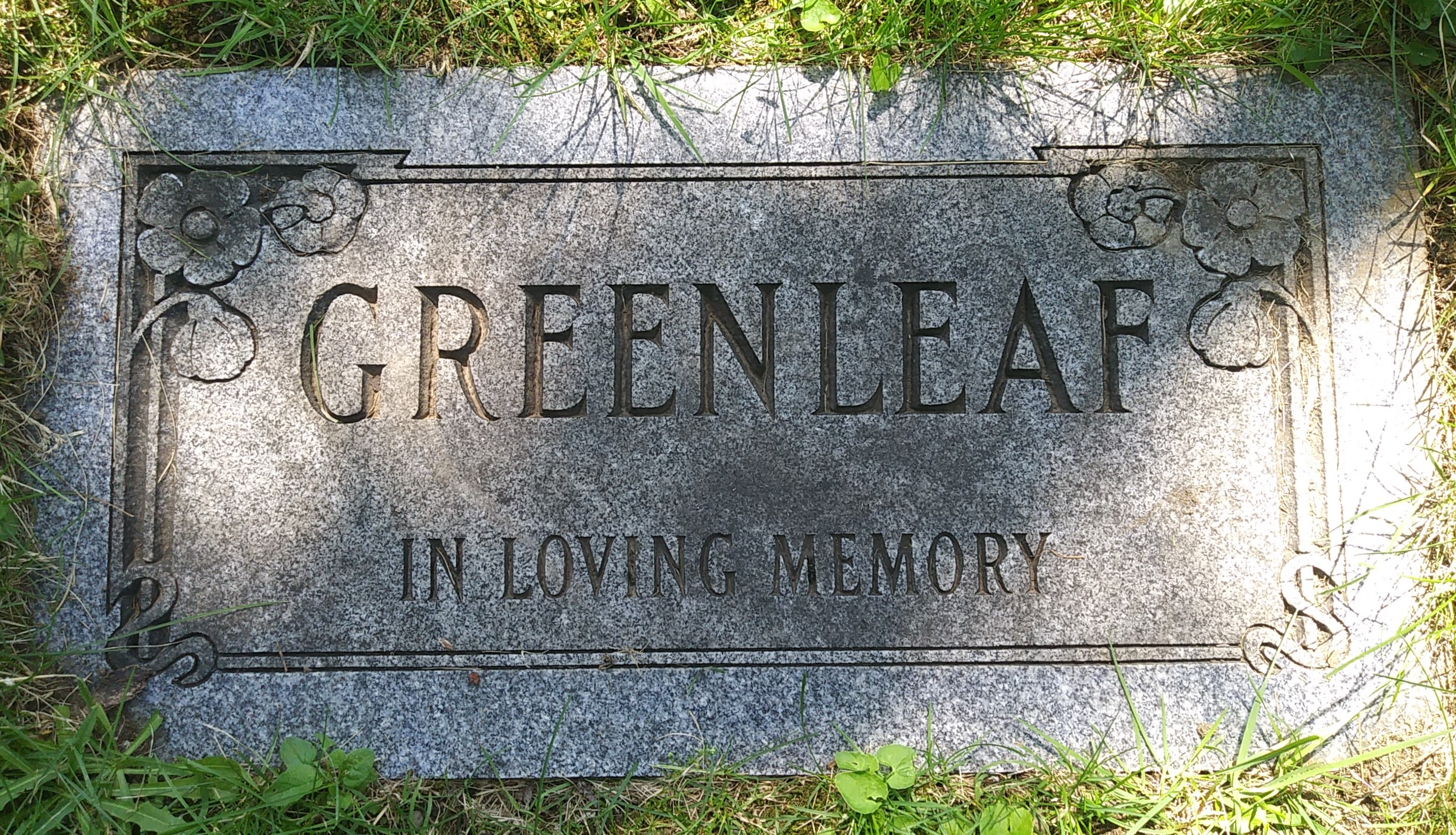
Greenleaf's grave site

Greenleaf attended the CAHA's silver jubilee celebrations at the Royal Alexandra Hotel in Winnipeg in 1939, where 11 of 13 past presidents were the guests of honour.

Greenleaf sought to honour the memories of hockey players who died during World War II and appealed to the public to assemble a collection of their photographs. His efforts resulted in a display at the Montreal Forum completed in time for the 1947–48 NHL season.

Greenleaf's wife Florence Silverson died on April 16, 1952. He died in Montreal on January 1, 1953, and was interred at Mount Royal Cemetery.
