= Capitale Junior AA Hockey League =

Canadian junior ice hockey league

- Sport: Ice hockey
- Founded: 1984
- No. of teams: 8
- Countries: Canada
- Headquarters: Quebec City, Quebec
- Most recent champion: Frontenac

The Capitale Junior AA Hockey League is a Canadian junior ice hockey league in the Province of Quebec, Canada. The league is sanctioned by Hockey Quebec and Hockey Canada. Annually, the champion of the league competes for the Coupe Dodge.

== Teams ==
Team	Centre
Champlain College Cougars	Quebec City, Quebec
Charlevoix Montagnards	Baie-Saint-Paul, Quebec
MRC Portneuf Tomahawks	Portneuf, Quebec
Montmorency Armada	Charlesbourg, Quebec
Montmorency Battalion	Charlesbourg, Quebec
Québec-Ouest Gouverneurs	Sainte-Foy, Quebec
Québec-Ouest Noroîts	Sainte-Foy, Quebec
Quebec Maurice	Frontenac, Québec

== Champions ==
- 2006 Québec-Ouest Gouverneurs
- 2007 Charlesbourg Elans
- 2008 Frontenac
- 2009 Beauport Harfangs
- 2010 Beauport Harfangs
- 2011 Québec-Ouest Ambassadeurs
- 2012 Québec-Ouest Ambassadeurs
- 2013 Québec-Ouest Gouverneurs
- 2014 Frontenac
- 2015 Québec-Ouest Gouverneurs
- 2016 Frontenac
- 2017 Quebec-Centre Maurice
- 2018 CRSA Noroits
