= Frank Dilio =

Canadian ice hockey administrator

- Born: Francis Paul Dilio; April 12, 1912; Montreal, Quebec, Canada
- Died: January 26, 1997 (aged 84)
- Organization: Hockey Québec
- Honours: Member of the Hockey Hall of Fame

Francis Paul Dilio (April 12, 1912 – January 26, 1997) was a Canadian ice hockey administrator in Quebec and is a member of the Hockey Hall of Fame. He served as the registrar and secretary of the Hockey Québec. The Quebec Major Junior Hockey League named one of its divisions after him, along with Robert Lebel.
