= Alex Faulkner =

Canadian ice hockey player (1936–2025)

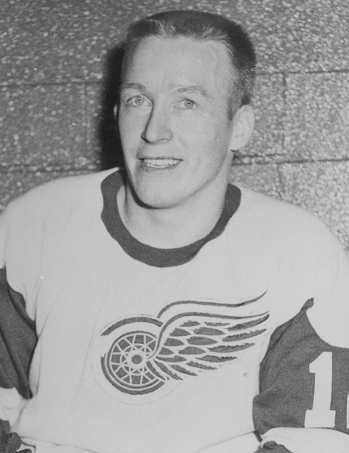
- Faulkner with Detroit Red Wings in 1963
- Born: May 21, 1936 Bishop's Falls, Newfoundland
- Died: April 7, 2025 (aged 88)
- Height: 5 ft 8 in (173 cm)
- Weight: 165 lb (75 kg; 11 st 11 lb)
- Position: Centre
- Shot: Left
- Played for: Toronto Maple Leafs; Detroit Red Wings
- Playing career: 1952–1976

Selm Alexander Faulkner (May 21, 1936 – April 7, 2025) was a Canadian professional ice hockey player and was the first National Hockey League (NHL) player from Newfoundland and Labrador. He played in the NHL from 1961 to 1964 with the Toronto Maple Leafs and Detroit Red Wings. The rest of his career, which lasted from 1952 to 1976, was mainly spent in the Newfoundland Senior Hockey League.

== Early life ==
Faulkner had four hockey-playing brothers, Lindy, George, Seth and Jack, and two sisters (Marie and Elizabeth). His parents were Lester, born in Bishop's Falls, and Olive who was a native of Point Leamington. Lester's mother (Svea) was born in Burträsk, Sweden and his father (William) was born in Sherbrooke, Guysborough County, Nova Scotia. Alex first learned to play hockey with his brothers on the Exploits River in Bishop's Falls. His brother George was the first Newfoundlander to play professional hockey.

== Playing career ==
Before entering the National Hockey League, Alex Faulkner was a star player in Newfoundland for the Conception Bay All Stars or Cee Bees, a team that was, for the most part, formed by his brother George. Faulkner led the league in both goals and points for two seasons.

Faulkner's big break came when the team played an exhibition game in 1960 against a St. John's senior team coached by former Toronto Maple Leafs player Howie Meeker. Meeker recommended Faulkner to the Toronto assistant general manager King Clancy.

Faulkner was invited to practise with the Leafs and was offered a contract with the Leafs' American Hockey League farm team, the Rochester Americans. In his second season in Rochester, Faulkner registered 73 points in 65 games. He was called up to the Leafs for one NHL game that season.

Faulkner's chances of landing a regular spot in the Leafs' lineup at centre were limited—the team already had Dave Keon, Red Kelly, Bob Pulford and Billy Harris at that position. The Leafs did not protect Faulkner, and he was claimed by the Detroit Red Wings in the Intra-League Draft on June 4, 1962.

That season, Faulkner found a place in the NHL on the Red Wings' third line with Larry Jeffrey and Bruce MacGregor. In his rookie season, Faulkner scored 10 goals and 20 points in 70 games while playing on the checking line.

It was in the playoffs in 1963, however, that Faulkner stood out. André Pronovost replaced Jeffrey on the line and, in that combination, Faulkner scored 5 goals in 8 playoff games, including three (two game-winners) against Chicago's Glenn Hall in the semi-finals. The underdog Red Wings eliminated the favoured Black Hawks to earn a berth in the Stanley Cup finals against Faulkner's former team, the Toronto Maple Leafs.

Faulkner played a pivotal role in Detroit's only win in that series, picking up two goals in the third game, including the game-winner.

When Faulkner returned to Newfoundland in the off-season, the province declared "Alex Faulkner Day." Schools were closed for a parade and ceremony hosted by Premier Joey Smallwood, who presented Faulkner with a pair of gold cuff links.

Faulkner returned to Detroit for the 1963–64 season, but a broken hand and ankle-ligament damage limited his season to 30 games. Detroit asked Faulkner to start the 1964–65 season in the minor leagues, but he instead returned to Conception Bay for the next two seasons.

When the NHL announced expansion starting with the 1967 season, Faulkner returned to minor professional hockey in the United States with the Red Wings farm teams, the Memphis Wings, and then for three more seasons with the San Diego Gulls.

At the beginning of his fourth season with the Gulls, Faulkner decided to return to Newfoundland, where he finished his career with the St. John's Capitals, retiring after the 1971–72 season.

Faulkner returned home to work in life insurance and later ran a senior citizens' home in Bishop's Falls. He continued playing amateur hockey well into his 60s and was inducted into the Newfoundland Hall of Fame.

== Death ==
Faulkner died on April 7, 2025, at the age of 86.

== Career achievements ==
=== Awards and achievements ===
- A Grand Falls Junior All-Stars member awarded the Veitch Memorial Trophy in 1953 as the first all-Newfoundland junior hockey champion.
- Awarded the Pan-American Trophy as the most valuable player in the 1953 all-Newfoundland junior hockey playoffs.
- Won five all-Newfoundland senior hockey championships including three Herders with the Grand Falls Andcos in 1955, 1956, and 1957 and two Herders with the Conception Bay CeeBees in 1960 and 1965.
- Won two all-Newfoundland senior 'B' hockey championships with the Grand Falls Senior Bees in 1956 and 1957.
- In December 1961, he played a game with the Toronto Maple Leafs to become the first Newfoundland-born player to play in the National Hockey League.
- Inducted into the Newfoundland and Labrador Hockey Hall of Fame in 1994.

== Career statistics ==
=== Regular season and playoffs ===
			Regular season					Playoffs
Season	Team	League	GP	G	A	Pts	PIM	GP	G	A	Pts	PIM
1951–52	Bishop's Falls Juniors	GFSHL	8	2	4	6	0	5	11	11	22	2
1951–52	Bishop's Falls Juniors	CA-HS	9	9	6	15	0	5	11	12	23	4
1952–53	Bishop's Falls Woodsmen	GFSHL	12	13	11	24	2	—	—	—	—	—
1952–53	Bishop's Falls Woodsmen	NLSHL	3	3	4	7	0	2	0	4	4	0
1952–53	Grand Falls All-Stars	NLSHL	1	3	1	4	0	—	—	—	—	—
1953–54	Bishop's Falls Woodsmen	GFSHL	14	13	17	30	5	2	1	2	3	0
1953–54	Grand Falls Bees	NLSHL	2	0	0	0	2	2	0	3	3	2
1954–55	Bishop's Falls Woodsmen	GFSHL	11	18	11	29	0	5	5	5	10	4
1954–55	Grand Falls All-Stars	NLSHL	9	10	12	22	0	4	4	2	6	4
1955–56	Bishop's Falls Kinsmen	GFSHL	12	20	17	37	8	—	—	—	—	—
1955–56	Grand Falls Andcos	NLSHL	5	6	3	9	0	3	4	6	10	4
1956–57	Bishop's Falls Kinsmen	GFSHL	12	20	17	37	8	—	—	—	—	—
1956–57	Grand Falls Bees	NLSHL	—	—	—	—	—	4	8	8	16	4
1957–58	Bishop's Falls Kinsmen	GFSHL	12	38	22	60	9	5	9	9	18	0
1957–58	Grand Falls Bees	NLSHL	—	—	—	—	—	12	14	11	25	4
1958–59	Conception Bay Cee Bees	NLSHL	25	103	49	152	32	8	23	13	36	6
1959–60	Conception Bay Cee Bees	NLSHL	19	47	36	83	33	11	41	45	86	18
1960–61	Conception Bay Cee Bees	NLSHL	—	—	—	—	—	—	—	—	—	—
1960–61	Rochester Americans	AHL	41	5	13	18	6	—	—	—	—	—
1961–62	Toronto Maple Leafs	NHL	1	0	0	0	0	—	—	—	—	—
1961–62	Rochester Americans	AHL	65	19	54	73	26	2	1	1	2	0
1962–63	Detroit Red Wings	NHL	70	10	10	20	6	8	5	0	5	2
1963–64	Detroit Red Wings	NHL	30	5	7	12	9	4	0	0	0	0
1963–64	Cincinnati Wings	CHL	11	4	8	12	6	—	—	—	—	—
1963–64	Pittsburgh Hornets	AHL	8	1	4	5	2	—	—	—	—	—
1964–65	Conception Bay Cee Bees	NFSHL	19	22	57	79	52	11	23	22	45	12
1965–66	Conception Bay Cee Bees	NFSHL	5	5	16	21	4	6	4	13	17	10
1966–67	Memphis Wings	CHL	70	28	60	88	32	7	2	5	7	14
1967–68	San Diego Gulls	WHL	71	26	41	67	32	7	2	2	4	2
1968–69	San Diego Gulls	WHL	73	17	51	68	16	7	2	4	6	4
1969–70	San Diego Gulls	WHL	60	17	48	65	14	6	0	6	6	4
1970–71	San Diego Gulls	WHL	4	1	1	2	0	—	—	—	—	—
1970–71	St. John's Capitals	NFSHL	36	26	47	73	18	11	9	21	30	—
1970–71	Grand Falls Cataracts	Al-Cup	—	—	—	—	—	5	3	4	7	2
1971–72	St. John's Capitals	NFSHL	24	18	42	60	52	4	2	3	5	2
1971–72	Grand Falls Cataracts	Al-Cup	—	—	—	—	—	4	0	3	3	0
1973–74	Gander Flyers	NFSHL	9	5	8	13	4	—	—	—	—	—
1975–76	Grand Falls Cataracts	NFSHL	8	6	10	16	4	7	10	8	18	14
NHL totals			101	15	17	32	15	12	5	0	5	2

== Sources ==
- Podnieks, Andrew (2003). Players:the ultimate A-Z guide of everyone who has ever played in the NHL. Doubleday Canada. ISBN 0-385-25999-9.
- Elliott, Jerry "Stats" (2010). Newfoundland and Labrador Senior Hockey: A Trip Down Memory Lane. Jerry Elliott.
