= St. Bon's Bluegolds =

- City: St. John's, NL
- League: St. John's Senior Hockey League
- Founded: 1899
- Operated: 1899–1974
- Home arena: Prince of Wales Rink; St. Bon's Forum; Memorial Stadium
- Colours: Blue and gold

The St. Bon's Bluegolds were an ice hockey team in the St. John's Senior hockey league, originally formed in January 1899 by the alumni of St. Bonaventure's College in St. John's.

== History ==
The "old Bonaventure boys" or "old boys", as they were known at the time, formed a hockey club and joined the newly founded city league that was founded by the Newfoundland Hockey Association.

The team colours selected in their first year were green and white but the club is best known for wearing the college colours of Blue and Gold.

The St. Bon's "old boys" played their first game on February 8, 1899 at the new Prince of Wales Rink against the Stars which was a team formed by the Star of the Sea Society. The first St. Bon's senior hockey team was Fergus J. Connelly (goal/Captain), G. H. Hally (cover point), J. F. Donnelly (point), M. O'Driscoll, W. Tobin, J Crotty, and W.R. Howley.

== Championships and awards ==
- Ten all-Newfoundland senior hockey championships (Herder Memorial Trophy) : 1936 thru 1940 and 1945 thru 1949.
- Twenty-seven St. John's Senior Hockey League championships (Boyle Trophy), including 16 straight wins from 1944 through 1959.
- Owners of the Rink Co. Ltd. Tie Cup (St. John's Hockey League Tie Cup Series) after three wins: 1922, 1924 and 1925.
- Owners of the Baird Tie Cup (St. John's Hockey League Tie Cup Series) after three wins: 1927, 1928 and 1929.
- Owners of the Rink Company Tie Cup (St. John's Hockey League Tie Cup Series) with wins 1931-1933.
- Owners of the Roper and Thompson Tie Cup (St. John's Hockey League Tie Cup Series) after three wins: 1935, 1936 and 1938.
- Winners of the Tobin Tie Cup (St. John's Hockey League Tie Cup Series) in 1939, 1941, 1944 through 1959.
