= Hockey Québec =

Canadian ice hockey governing body

- Sport: Ice hockey
- Jurisdiction: Quebec
- Founded: 1976

Official website
- hockey.qc.ca
- (Canada)
- (Quebec)

Hockey Québec is the governing body of all ice hockey in Quebec, Canada. Hockey Québec is a branch of Hockey Canada.

== History ==
Hockey Québec was organized in 1976 to take over from the various organizations governing hockey in Quebec. Hockey Québec is formed by 15 different regional associations.

=== Quebec Amateur Hockey Association ===
The Quebec Amateur Hockey Association (QAHA) was founded at the Montreal AAA clubhouse on January 19, 1919, with Hartland MacDougall elected as president and W. R. Granger as the vice-president. The association affiliated with the Canadian Amateur Hockey Association (CAHA), and required Amateur Athletic Union of Canada registration cards for all players which prevented any professionals from joining. The Interscholastic Hockey League joined the Montreal City Amateur Hockey League under the jurisdiction of the QAHA and became eligible for the Allan Cup playoffs as the senior ice hockey champions of Canada, and the Junior Amateur Hockey Association also joined the QAHA and became eligible for the Memorial Cup playoffs as the junior ice hockey champions of Canada.

The Allan Cup

The Gazette credited Granger for being instrumental in founding the QAHA, fighting to maintain amateurism and for allowing hockey to thrive in Quebec. The establishment of the QAHA protected its leagues from the loss of players to the Eastern Canada Amateur Hockey Association, from which the Montreal City Amateur Hockey League had resigned during World War I in a dispute that the association operated under veiled professionalism. Granger warned that anyone playing against professionals would jeopardize their amateur status, and that the Eastern Canada Amateur Hockey Association had never affiliated with the QAHA or the CAHA. Granger was elected president of the QAHA on December 8, 1919, and continued his campaign to clean up amateur hockey and expand the influence of the CAHA when he welcomed the Ottawa Amateur Federation into an affiliation with the QAHA. The affiliation settled the differences between multiple leagues in Ottawa now unified under the same jurisdiction. The QAHA implemented standard rules to rid its leagues of unsporting physical play, and grew with the additions of the Montreal City Amateur Intermediate League and the Bankers League of Montreal. With the intent to stabilize rosters for the playoffs, Granger enforced a deadline of January 31 where teams could mutually agree to allow players to transfer from one team to another. The Ottawa Amateur Federation left the QAHA in 1920, when it was granted branch status in the CAHA as the Ottawa and District Amateur Hockey Association (ODAHA). Despite the loss of the Ottawa teams, the QAHA grew by accepting three new leagues based in Montreal, the Montreal Independent Intermediate Hockey League, the Pulp and Paper Company League, and the Montreal Industrial League; and expected applications from the Quebec City Intermediate League and the Quebec City Junior League, in addition to the existing Quebec City Senior League.

In March 1921, the QAHA registration committee listened to an appeal by George Dufresne for an amateur card which he had been refused. Dufresne admitted that he had played semi-professional baseball, and argued that he should be reinstated as an amateur since he had not reached the age of majority when the incident occurred. He filed legal action seeking a writ of mandamus to be issued an amateur card, and testified that he was young and inexperienced at the time, did not know that he was playing with professionals. Granger and the QAHA registration committee agreed to give Dufresne a fresh start and issued him an amateur card.

The CAHA unanimously elected Granger its president on March 19, 1921. He remained president of the QAHA, and called a special meeting in April 1921 to discuss incorporation into the CAHA and revisions to the QAHA constitution necessitated by the Dufresne court action. Granger welcomed recommendations from members of the association and sought to have the constitution and registration forms printed in both English and French. Commercial leagues in Montreal gave Granger a vote of confidence and agreed that professionals in another sport should be excluded from amateur hockey.

At the QAHA general meeting in December 1921, Granger recommended revisions to the constitution to improve finances and ensure amateur player registrations, and retired as president because he held the same position with the CAHA. The QAHA approved his recommendations to automatically suspend any player who filed legal action, to compel players to accept rulings of the registration committee unless an appeal was heard by the CAHA, and to charge registration fees to senior players and annual dues to leagues to help fund the QAHA.

In April 1924, the QAHA changed its structure to be more similar to the Ontario Hockey Association, where clubs affiliated directly with the association instead of as a members of a league. The QAHA felt that the calibre of play was reduced when leagues competed against each other for players, and that clubs would better develop talent by eliminating the struggle to find players.

The Memorial Cup

Frank Greenleaf was unanimously elected president of the QAHA in April 1927. He appointed a special committee to revise the constitution and by-laws to resolve a lack of clarity that had resulted recurring petty differences, and chaired a meeting requested by the leagues to discuss a "one-man, one-league" regulation. QAHA by-laws at the time allowed for a person to play for a team operated by his employer and one other recreational team. The leagues felt that players were fatigued, and agreed that by limiting a player to one team and playing fewer games it would increase the overall quality of hockey and subsequently improve the QAHA's results in the Allan Cup playoffs. The leagues were also concerned about increasing competition for players by commercial leagues. The Mount Royal Junior Hockey League was founded in 1928, which created a venue for junior ice hockey talent to develop and be regularly featured on Saturday afternoons at the Montreal Forum.

During the 1935–36 season playoffs, the QAHA established a referee board and named Norman Dawe the convenor. He sought to unify all referees in Quebec under a governing body to assign games in the provincial playoffs and establish a grading system. In 1938, the QAHA established an inter-provincial playoff for the juvenile age group champion in minor ice hockey versus the ODAHA champion.

Dawe was elected president of the QAHA in 1940. He wanted the QAHA to support hockey teams composed of Canadian servicemen during the war, and appointed a committee to liaise with military leaders on how the QAHA could provide a place to play or provide financial assistance. Military leagues from Quebec City, Montreal, and Sherbrooke, then affiliated with the QAHA. The Gazette credited the QAHA for having carefully handled expenses which profited more than C$2,400 during wartime conditions, and allowed the QAHA to invest $4,000 into victory bonds for the war effort. By 1941, the QAHA minor hockey board oversaw its own player registrations, had grown to include a vice-chairman and district convenors, and established the first constitution for minor hockey in the province.

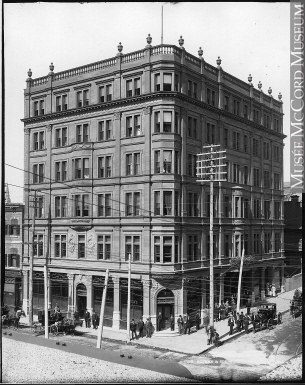
The Queen's Hotel regularly hosted QAHA annual meetings while Dawe was president. (Note: The QAHA held its annual meetings at the Queen's Hotel in 1940, 1941, 1942, 1943, 1944, and 1945.)

The QAHA and Dawe sought for teams from Eastern Canada to have more home games during the Memorial Cup and Allan Cup playoffs. At the 1941 CAHA general meeting, his motion was approved to allow the eastern and western portions of the national playoffs to be handled by the respective CAHA branches. Despite the approval, the CAHA had expressed concerns about the low gate receipts at the Montreal Forum, compared to expected profits elsewhere. The QSHL proposed forming an Eastern Canada Hockey Association for the Allan Cup playoffs. Under the proposal, the QAHA, the ODAHA, and the Maritime Amateur Hockey Association, would work together in the playoffs to determine one team to play against the Ontario champion; and share the profits from the gate receipts among themselves before the CAHA took its share. Dawe stated that the proposal may seem like mutiny, but that the QAHA wanted to form a new association within the CAHA, and voice Eastern Canada's concerns. The QAHA also contested that with more playoffs games, Montreal could be built into a junior hockey city with profitable gate receipts. The CAHA chose to increase travel expenses to teams during the playoffs instead of forming the Eastern Canada Hockey Association.

In November 1942, CAHA past-president George Dudley felt that, "the QAHA now has the best executive in its history". The QAHA had purchased almost $7,000 in victory bonds by 1942, permitted teams composed of military servicemen to play without paying an entrance fee or annual dues, and Dawe urged for more support of military sports organizations. The QAHA also planned a roll of honour for any of its players who had enlisted or would enlist in the Canadian military. The QAHA continued to grow when it welcomed the Montreal Minor Hockey Association into membership, which controlled almost 100 hockey rinks in Greater Montreal. The QAHA divided its junior ice hockey leagues into tiers, when it adopted the junior-B rating, similar to other CAHA branches.

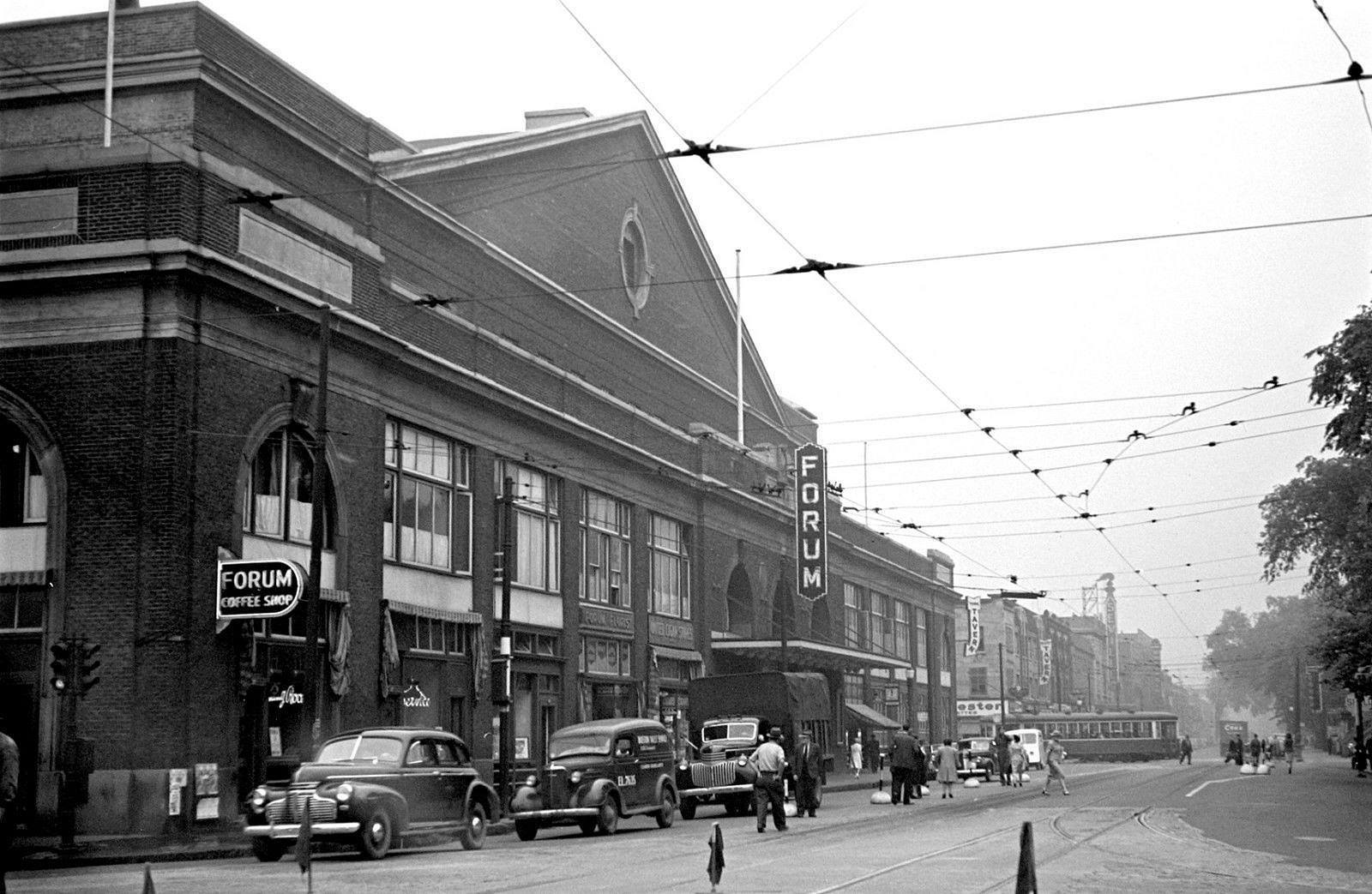
The Montreal Forum, c. 1945

The ODAHA denied permission for the Ottawa Commandos and the Hull Volants to play in the QSHL, and wanted the teams to play in the Ottawa City Hockey League. The QSHL subsequently voted to operate the 1944–45 season with four teams independent of the QAHA and CAHA. Dawe attempted to mediate the dispute by allowing the ODAHA to keep the five per cent share of gate receipts for the Ottawa and Hull teams, instead of the funds being paid to the QAHA. After a week of discussions, the ODAHA accepted Dawe's recommendation. Rumors about the QSHL becoming a professional minor league persisted in The Gazette, which reported that teams were upset with the amount of travel expenses given by the CAHA in the Allan Cup playoffs. The Winnipeg Free Press reported that the QSHL was the best senior hockey league in Canada, and that NHL executives resented that the Montreal Canadiens had the first pick of any player from the league. Dawe stated that Lester Patrick of the New York Rangers, and Art Ross of the Boston Bruins, wanted to see the QSHL and other CAHA senior leagues become professional for the best interests of the other NHL teams. The QSHL remained an amateur league for the 1945–46 season, which resulted in the QAHA being in its best financial position to date with the majority of income from QSHL gate receipts.

By the 1946–47 season, the QAHA had grown to include 59 leagues, 281 clubs, and increased its registration by 1,847 players from the previous season. The QAHA referee's committee had grown to become a self sufficient, and established a scouting and evaluation process to encourage new officials. He also wanted to stop the abuse of referees by players, and give indefinite suspensions to any offender.

The QAHA was suspended by the CAHA in 1953, after issuing a player card to Ron Attwell whose transfer from the Ontario Hockey Association to the Montreal Junior Canadiens was not approved. During the 1953 Quebec Junior Hockey League playoffs, the Quebec Citadelles withdrew from the QAHA and were reinstated by the CAHA for the 1953 Memorial Cup playoffs.

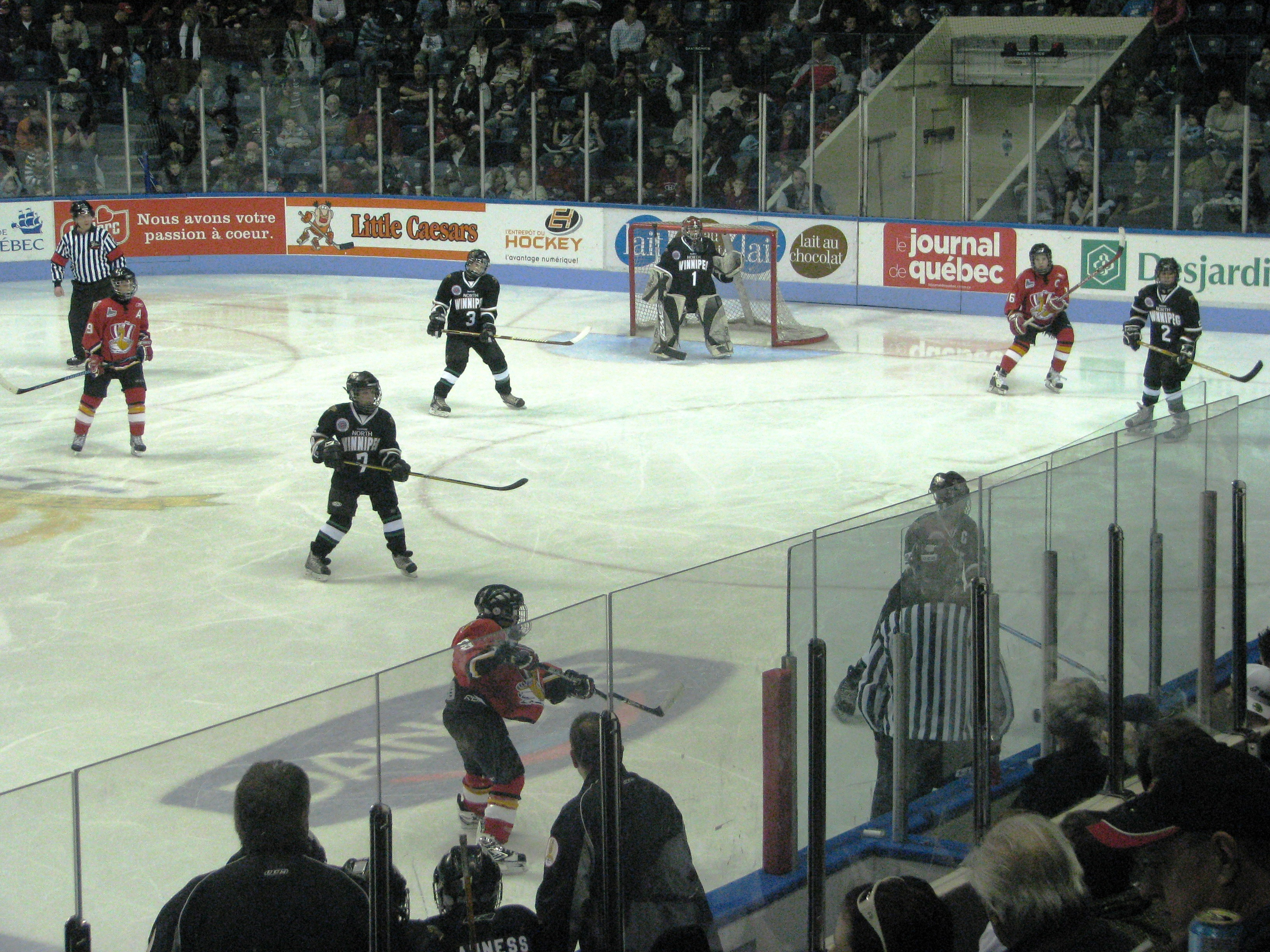
Quebec International Pee-Wee Hockey Tournament game action

Lionel Fleury was elected president of the QAHA to succeed Robert Lebel in June 1955, and was the first person to live outside of Greater Montreal to hold the position. He planned to replace the Quebec Junior Hockey League with a new league composed of local talent on teams that operated at a lower level of junior hockey, and be purely amateur without seeking financial assistance from the NHL. The new league grew as two seasons passed, but its teams were unable to compete at same level as the Montreal Junior Canadiens or teams in the Ontario Hockey Association. The QAHA contended those teams were operating on a semi-professional basis since they paid a weekly stipend to their players and were too strong of competition in the Memorial Cup playoffs for the Canadian junior championship. In January 1957, the QAHA reached an agreement with the Maritime Amateur Hockey Association and the ODAHA to establish a new junior championship at a lower level than the Memorial Cup. They invited teams from the Northern Ontario Hockey Association and Western Canada to join, then presented the plan for approval by the CAHA. The CAHA voted instead to allow its weaker branches to strengthen their championship teams by adding up to six players in the Memorial Cup playoffs. The Confederation of Recreation in Quebec City chose to operate independently and leave the jurisdiction of the QAHA in 1959. The QAHA regained a presence in the city after it gave approval to establish the Quebec International Pee-Wee Hockey Tournament in 1960, which operated as a minor hockey event during the Quebec Winter Carnival.

=== Presidents ===
- Hartland MacDougall, 1919
- W. R. Granger, 1919 to 1921
- Frank Greenleaf, 1927 to 1930
- Norman Dawe, 1940 to 1947
- Robert Lebel, 1951 to 1955
- Lionel Fleury, 1955 to 1960
- Michael Brind’Amour

== Leagues ==
Junior AAA

- Quebec Junior Hockey League (Canadian Junior A)

Junior AA

- Chaudiere-Appalaches Junior AA Hockey League
- Capitale Junior AA Hockey League
- Laurentides-Lanaudière Junior AA Hockey League
- Lac St-Louis Junior AA Hockey League
- Metropolitaine Junior AA Hockey League
- Saguenay-Lac-St-Jean Junior AA Hockey League

Junior A

- Boucherville Junior A Hockey League
- Hockey Expert Junior A Hockey League
- Laval Junior A Hockey League
- Lac St-Louis Junior A Hockey League
- Lac St-Jean Junior A Hockey League
- Mauricie Junior A Hockey League
- Montreal Junior A Hockey League
- Orford-St-Francois Junior A Hockey League
- Ligue de Hockey Junior A Rive-Sud
- Rive-Nord Junior A Hockey League
- Saguenay Junior A Hockey League
- Yamaska-Missisquoi Junior A Hockey League

Junior B

- Hockey Expert Junior B Hockey League
- Laval Junior B Hockey League
- Lac St-Louis Junior B Hockey League
- Mauricie Junior B Hockey League
- Montreal Junior B Hockey League
- Orford-St-Francois Junior B Hockey League
- Rive-Nord Junior B Hockey League
- Rive-Sud Junior B Hockey League
- Yamaska-Missisquoi Junior B Hockey League

Collegiate

- Ligue de hockey féminin collégial AA

Defunct

- Montreal Senior Group—men's senior amateur league, until 1944
- Quebec Senior Hockey League—men's senior amateur league, until 1953
- Quebec Junior A Hockey League (1972-1982; Junior "AAA")
- Bas St-Laurent Junior AA Hockey League (Unknown-2013)
- Estrie-Mauricie Junior AA Hockey League
- Quebec-Est Junior AA Hockey League

== Provincial championships ==
The Junior "AA" Provincial title is the Coupe Dodge.

== Special events ==
The Quebec International Pee-Wee Hockey Tournament is an annual minor ice hockey event in Quebec City co-founded by Gérard Bolduc, Paul Dumont and others in 1960.

== See also ==
- List of ice hockey teams in Quebec
- Hockey Canada
