= Quebec Provincial Hockey Championship =

Canadian amateur ice hockey championship

Coupe Chevrolet
- Most recent season or competition: 2024
- Sport: Ice Hockey
- Founded: 1978
- Country: Quebec
- Most recent champion: L'Expert de St-Romuald (2024)
- Website: https://www.coupechevrolet.ca/fr/index.html

The Quebec Provincial Hockey Championship (French: Championnats Provinciaux de Hockey, known as Coupe Chevrolet, or the Chevrolet Cup for commercial reasons) is a provincial championship in the men's and women's amateur ice hockey leagues in Quebec, Canada. This tournament is sanctioned by both Fédération québécoise de hockey sur glace (Hockey Quebec) and Hockey Canada.

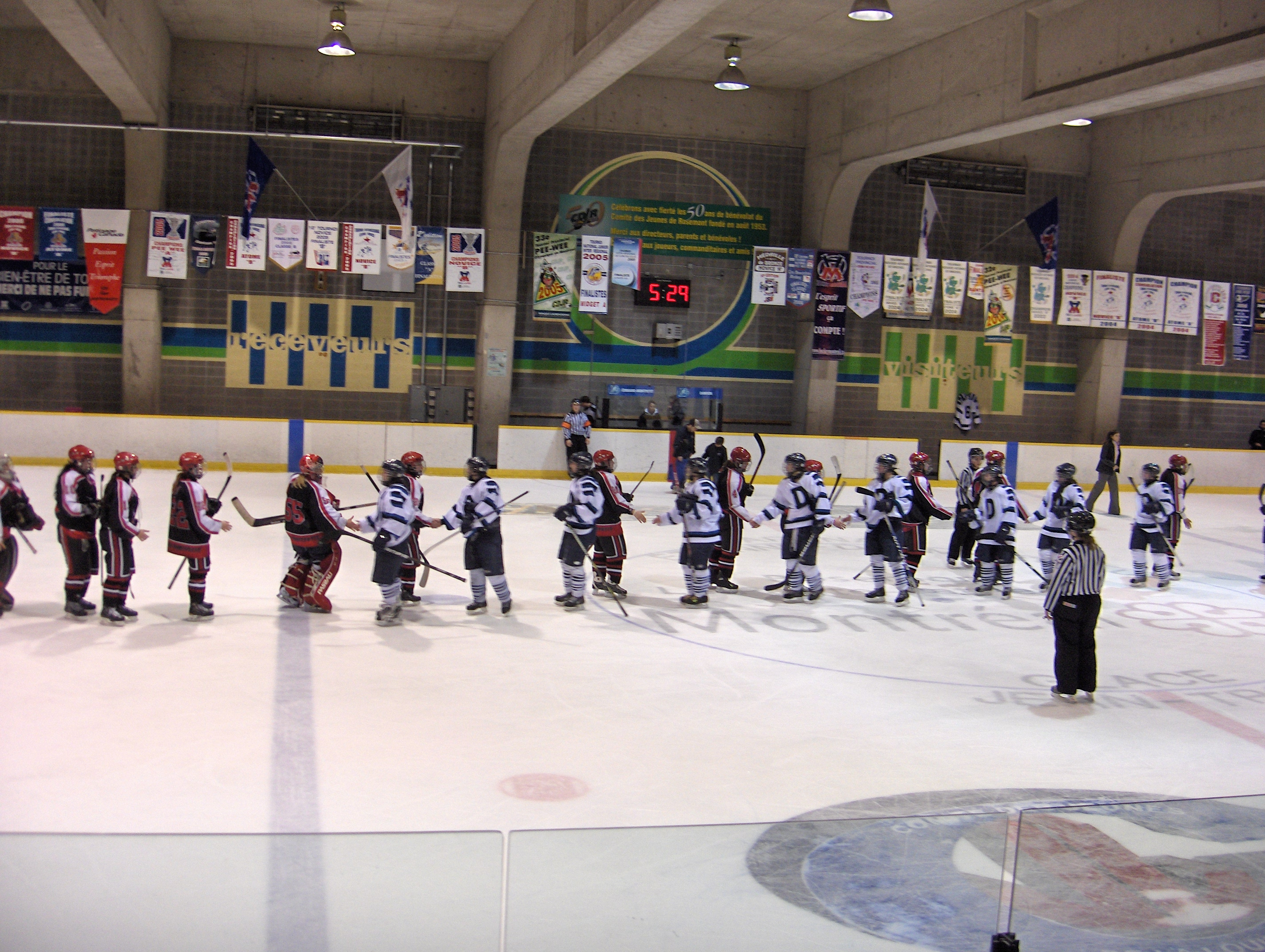
2011 Coupe Dodge semifinal

== History ==
The first provincial championships organized by Hockey Quebec were presented at Montreal in 1978. The name of the trophy has changed over the years because of sponsorship: Daoust (1978–85), Purlator (1986–88), Chrysler (1989–2002), Dodge (2003–2022), and Chevrolet since 2022. This tournament that determines the top double letter teams ("AA" ) at each level for boys and girls (U7, U9. U11, U13, U15, U18, U21) within the province of Quebec. Generally, the Quebec Provincial Championship extends over four or five days in April of every year.

== Men's Provincial Championship ==
The Dodge Cup is the Quebec Provincial Championship for all age levels represented for U-21 (previously known as Junior B, or "Junior AA" in Quebec) hockey in Canada. Similar provincial championships exist in Ontario (Sutherland Cup), Western Canada (Keystone Cup), Eastern Ontario (Barkley Cup), and Atlantic Canada (Don Johnson Memorial Cup)—leaving five teams at the end of each year with a shared claim to being the best Junior B team in Canada.

The U-21 "AA" championships began in 1988. In 2006, Hockey Quebec allowed for the Shawville Pontiacs and the Gatineau Mustangs of the Eastern Ontario Junior B Hockey League to take part in the event, even though they compete in a league based in Ontario. In 2008, Hockey Quebec allowed for two regional champions to share the Dodge Cup.

=== List of U21 "AA" (or B in other parts of Canada) Provincial Champions ===
In Québec, the U-21 "AA" classification is the equivalent of Junior "B" in the rest of Canada. The 2008 year marked a decision by Hockey Quebec to allow two separate tournaments with two separate champions.

Year	Champion	Runner-up	Score	City
1984	St-Laurent			
1985	Jonquière			
1986				
1987	Trois-Rivières Draveurs			
1988				
1989	Dolbeau Castors			
1990	Ste-Marie-Beauce			
1991	Charlesbourg Laurentiens			
1992	St-Henri R.B.M.			
1993	St-Raymond Dynamiques			
1994	Coaticook Frontaliers			
1995	St-Raymond Dynamiques			
1996	Warwick Cougars			
1997	Brossard Broncos			
1998	Rive-Sud			
1999	St-Romuald Atmosphère			
2000	Laval Express			
2001	Rosemère Nationals			
2002	Laval Sénateurs			
2003	Laval Sénateurs			
2004	St-Hubert Governors (RJAAHL)	Rosemont Ambassadors (MJAAHL)	6–2	
2005	St-Hubert Governors (RJAAHL)			
2006	Plessisville V. Boutin (EMJAAHL)	Jonquiere Marquis (SLSJJAAHL)	1–0 SO	Gatineau, Quebec
2007	Montréal-Nord Nordiques (RJAAHL)	Windsor Sport Wellington (EMJAAHL)	5–1	
2008	Richelieu Éclaireurs (RJAAHL)	Coaticook Frontaliers (EMJAAHL)	1–0	
-	Repentigny Mustangs (LLJAAHL)	Normandin Eperviers (SLSJJAAHL)	5–2	
2009	Moulins Garaga (LLJAAHL)	St-Cyrille Cyclones (EMJAAHL)	3–2	
2010	Windsor Momo Sports (EMJAAHL)	Lorraine-Rosemère Nationals (LLJAAHL)	5–1	Plessisville, Quebec
2011	Suroit Express (LSLJAAHL)	Moulins Gladiators (LLJAAHL)	7–3	Montreal, Quebec
2012	Rosemère Nationals (LLJAAHL)	Jonquiere Marquis (SLSJJAAHL)	5–0	Laval, Quebec
2013	St-Tite Mustangs (EMJAAHL)	St-Eustache Patriots (LLJAAHL)	5–4	Lachute, Quebec
2014	Cowansville Nordik (EMJAAHL)	Richelieu Patriots (LHMJAA)	4–3	Carleton, Quebec
2015	Bellechasse Lafontaine (CAJAAHL)	Plessisville V. Boutin (EMJAAHL)	6–2	Laval, Quebec
2016	Trois-Rivieres Draveurs (EMJAAHL)	Delta Ducs (MJAAHL)	4–3 OT	Saint-Anselme, Quebec
2017	Bellechasse Lafontaine (CAJAAHL)	Jonquìère Marquis (SLSJJAAHL)	8-7 OT	Montreal, Quebec
2018	Bellechasse Lafontaine (CAJAAHL)	Lorraine-Rosemère Nationals (LLJAAHL)	2-1 OT	Gatineau, Quebec
2019	Bellechasse Lafontaine (CAJAAHL)	Saint-Laurent Phoenix (LHMJAA)	2-1	Brossard, Quebec

== Women's Provincial Championship ==
=== History ===
In 2008, the first Provincial Championship for women was added.

- U-11 (9–10 years )
- U-13 (11–12 years)
- U-15 (13–14 years)
- U-18 (15-16-17 years)
- U-21 (18-19-20-21 years)

In 2007, the Dodge Cup has 60 women's teams quarrel the competition during 11–15 April: U-13 AA 6 teams, U-13 A 10 teams, U-15 AA 8 teams, U-15 A 8 teams, U-18 AA 8 teams, U-18 A 10 teams and finally U-21 A 10 teams. Since 2008 the women's Dodge Cup is held at a different venue and date than the men's competition.

=== Tournaments ===
==== 2008 ====
The historic first presentation of the women's provincial championships took place in 2008. The women's and men's championships both took place in the Saguenay–Lac-Saint-Jean and Côte-Nord regions during 9–13 April 2008. A total of 66 women's teams competed for the championship: Pee-wee AA 8 teams, Pee-wee A 10 teams, Bantam AA 10 teams, Bantam A 8 teams, Midget AA 10 teams, Midget A 12 teams and finally Junior A 8 teams:

- Pee-wee AA , played at Aréna Luc & Marie-Claude, in La Malbaie.
- Pee-wee A , contested at Aréna de Donnacona, in Donnacona.
- Bantam AA , competed at Aréna Luc & Marie-Claude, in La Malbaie.
- Bantam A , participated at Aréna de Donnacona, in Donnacona.
- Midget AA and Midget A , played at Centre récréatif St-Félicien, in St-Félicien.
- Junior A , played at Aréna de Mashteuiatsh, in Mashteuiatsh.

: The Champions 2008

Category	Classe	Team	of the region
Pee-wee	AA	Rafales de la Mauricie	Mauricie
Pee-wee	A	Express de l'Outaouais	Outaouais
Bantam	AA	Sélects du Lac St-Louis	Lake St-louis
Bantam	A	Étoiles de Beauval	Lake St-Louis
Midget	AA	Remparts du Richelieu	Richelieu
Midget	A	les Intrépides	Gaspésie Îles-De-la-Madeleine
Junior	A	Chaudière-Etchemin	Québec Chaudière-Appalache

==== 2009 ====
The 2009 edition of the women's provincial championship took place in the Lake Saint-Louis region from 8–12 April 2009: 66 women's teams competed in 7 different categories :Pee Wee A 8 teams, Pee Wee AA 8 teams, Bantam A 8 teams, Bantam AA 12 teams, Midget A 8 teams, Midget AA 12 teams and Junior A 10 teams. In addition, it was the first presence of four semifinalist teams that came from the Quebec women collegial league (Ligue de hockey féminin collégial AA).

: The Champions 2009

Category	Classe	Team	of the region
Pee-wee	AA	Rafales de la Mauricie	Mauricie
Pee-wee	A	Rafales de Sherbrooke	Estrie
Bantam	AA	Élites de l'Estrie	Estrie
Bantam	A	Lachine Maroons	Lake St-Louis
Midget	AA	Lac St-Louis	Lake St-Louis
Midget	A	Sherbrooke Queens	Estrie
Junior	A	Charlesbourg	Quebec Chaudiere-Appalaches
Collegiate	AA	Lynx du Collège Édouard Montpetit	Richelieu

==== 2010 ====
The 2010 Provincial Championship was held from 31 March to 4 April 2010. The women's championship was from 7 to 11 April: the events from the Coupe Dodge were held in the region of Estrie. The organizing committee selected five cities as hosts for the women's competition. The event, which featured approximately 2000 female players, featured a total of 223 matches. In addition, the 2010 edition of the Cup gave way to some novelties, of which there was a Skills Challenge exclusively featuring women. Said challenge served to indicate the best player as well as the best goalkeeper in terms of skill. Finally we attended the semi-finals and the final of women college ice hockey (Ligue de hockey féminin collégial AA).

: The Champions 2010

Category	Classe	Team	of the region
Atom	A	Aigles Trois-Rivières Ouest	Mauricie
Atom	B	Castors de Normandie	Mauricie
Pee-wee	AA	Express du Richelieu	Richelieu
Pee-wee	A	Express de l'Outaouais	Outaouais
Pee-wee	B	Riveraines Bécancour-Lotbinière	Mauricie
Bantam	AA	Élites de l'Estrie	Estrie
Bantam	A	Rebelles de Laval	Laval
Bantam	B	Rebelles de Saguenay	Saguenay-Lac St-Jean
Midget	AA	Remparts du Richelieu	Richelieu
Midget	A	Harfangs des Laurentides	Laurentides
Midget	B	Royals West-Island	Lake St-Louis
Junior	A	Rafales de Mauricie	Mauricie
Junior	B	Panthères Rose Nicolet	Mauricie
Collegiate	AA	Lynx du Collège Édouard Montpetit	Richelieu

==== 2011 ====
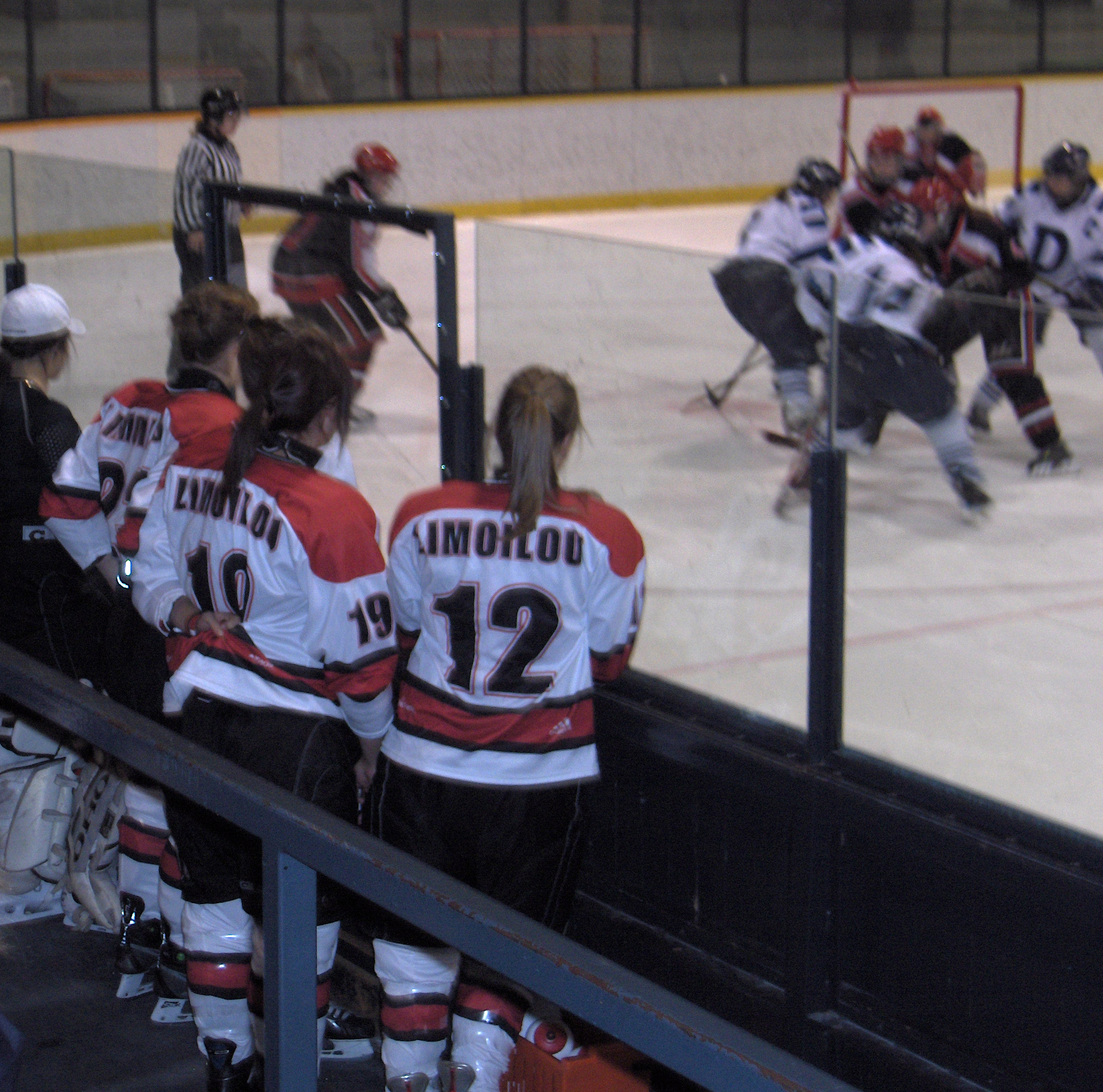
Several players observe the other matches to encourage the girls

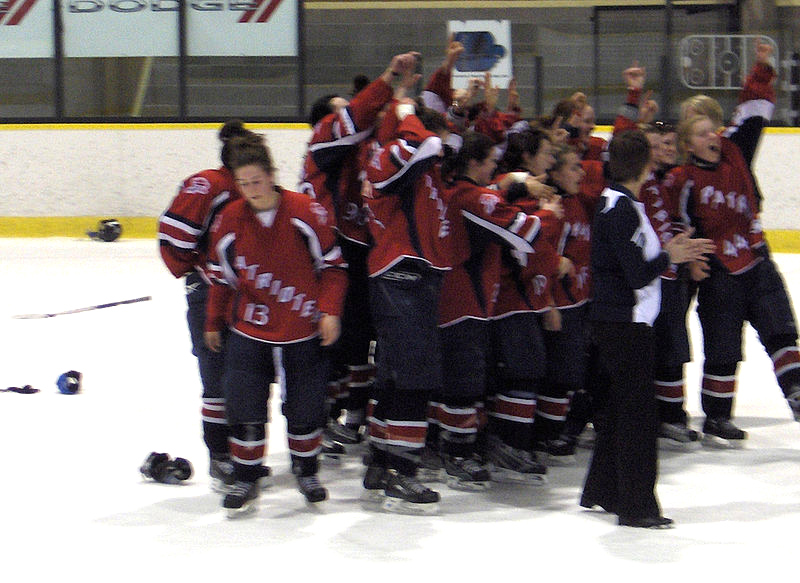
Pain is temporary. Pride is forever

The competition was held from 31 March to 3 April in Montreal. For the first time in the four year existence of the women's Provincial Championship, the women's tournament will be contested in a city different from the men's competition: 118 women's teams (1775 girls playing ) in 14 category.

- Atom A, played at Centre Étienne Desmarteau
- Atom B, played at Aréna Henri-Bourassa
- Pee-wee AA, played at Aréna Michel-Normandin
- Pee-wee A, played at Centre Étienne Desmarteau
- Pee-wee B, played at Aréna Bill Burnan
- Bantam AA, played at Aréna Chaumont
- Bantam A, played at Aréna Michel-Normandin
- Bantam B , played at Aréna Chaumont
- Midget AA , played at Aréna St-Louis
- Midget A , played at Centre Étienne Desmarteau
- Midget B , played at Aréna Bill Burnan
- Junior A , played at Aréna Chaumont
- Junior B , played at Aréna Chaumont
- Collegiate AA , played at Centre Étienne Desmarteau

The finals of four championship categories(besides the semi-finals and the finals of Ligue de hockey féminin collégial AA) was presented at the Centre Étienne Desmarteau.

: The Champions 2011

Category	Classe	Team	of the region
Atom	A	Aigles Trois-Rivières Ouest	Mauricie
Atom	B	Rapides Sherbrooke	Estrie
Pee-wee	AA	Élites Estrie	Estrie
Pee-wee	A	Étoile Beauval	St-Louis lake
Pee-wee	B	Aigles Trois-Rivières Ouest	Mauricie
Bantam	AA	Élites Estrie	Estrie
Bantam	A	Rebelles Saguenay	Saguenay-Lac-St-Jean
Bantam	B	Canadiennes Montreal	Montreal
Midget	AA	Kodiacs Lac St-Louis	St-Louis lake
Midget	A	Rebelles Saguenay	Saguenay-Lac-St-Jean
Midget	B	Panthères Thetford-Mines	Quebec-Chaudière-Appalaches
Junior	A	Rafales Shawinigan	Mauricie
Junior	B	Royals West-Island	St-Louis Lake
Collegiate	AA	Patriotes du Cégep Saint-Laurent	Montreal

==== 2012 ====
The women's Provincial Championships were held from 12 till 15 April 2012 to Laval. More than 200 girls' ice hockey teams from 14 regions of Quebec will come to conclude the 2011-12 regular season and to determine champions in the various categories.

Because of a change by the Quebec Student Sports Federation, the collegiate division was now labeled by RSEQ, the French title for the governing body of collegiate sports in the province.

The tournaments were held in seven venues in Laval, and five in Montréal:

- Atom A,
- Atom B,
- Pee-wee AA,
- Pee-wee A,
- Pee-wee B,
- Bantam AA,
- Bantam A,
- Bantam B ,
- Midget AA ,
- Midget A ,
- Midget B ,
- Junior AA.
- Junior A ,
- Junior B
- Collegiate RSEQ ,

: The Champions 2012

Category	Classe	Team	of the region
Atom	A		
Atom	B		
Pee-wee	AA		
Pee-wee	A		
Pee-wee	B		
Bantam	AA		
Bantam	A		
Bantam	B		
Midget	AA		
Midget	A		
Midget	B		
Junior	AA		
Junior	A		
Junior	B		
Collegiate	RSEQ		
