= Joseph R. Byrne =

Canadian ice hockey player and coach

- Born: March 22, 1921; Charlesbourg, Quebec, Canada
- Died: August 26, 1990 (aged 69); Grand Falls-Windsor, Newfoundland, Canada
- Spouse: Patricia

Joseph Richard Byrne (March 22, 1921 – August 26, 1990) was a Canadian ice hockey player and coach.

== Career ==
Joe Byrne learned the game of hockey from Hall of Famer Alex Connell. After leaving the service in 1946, he joined the New York Rangers organization. Joe was a scout for the Rangers farm system in Quebec in the early 1950s. He was hired by the Grand Falls Athletic Association to coach their hockey team and arrived in Grand Falls-Windsor, Newfoundland on December 7, 1949. He was involved in Newfoundland hockey as either a coach, player or referee for the next 40 years until his retirement in the summer of 1989. Byrne operated a sports shop at Grand Falls beginning in the early 1950s.

=== Awards and honours ===
- Hockey NL Gold Stick Award in 1978.
- In 1982, he was presented with the Gordon Juckes Award from the Canadian Amateur Hockey Association for national achievement.
- Inducted into the Newfoundland and Labrador Sports Hall of Fame on November 4, 1989.
- Awarded C.H.A Award by Hockey NL in 1989 for outstanding service to minor hockey.
- Awarded the Hockey Canada Order of Merit in 1990.
- Inducted into the Newfoundland and Labrador Hockey Hall of Fame on May 28, 1995.

== Personal life ==
Byrne was born in Charlesbourg, Quebec. He had one brother and four sisters. His wife's name was Patricia (Pat). Joe Byrne died on August 26, 1990, in Grand Falls-Windsor. On Friday March 22, 1991, in a ceremony attended by his wife Pat, on what would have been Joe's 70th birthday, the Grand Falls Stadium was renamed Joe Byrne Memorial Stadium as a tribute to his contributions to hockey in the community and the province during his 40-year career.
