= Shawinigan-Falls Cataracts =

The Shawinigan-Falls Cataracts are a defunct minor professional ice hockey team that was based in Shawinigan Falls, Quebec. The team played in the Quebec Hockey League from 1954 to 1958, and operated as a farm team for the Montreal Canadiens of the National Hockey League for the 1955–56 season.

During their four seasons of play, the Cataracts played 258 games and compiled a record of 137 wins, 101 losses, and 20 ties. They achieved their best win-loss record during the 1955–56 season when they earned 89 points in 64 regular season games.
