= Saguenay-Lac-St-Jean Junior AA Hockey League =

- Sport: Ice hockey
- No. of teams: 6
- Countries: Canada
- Headquarters: Alma, Quebec
- Most recent champion: Jonquìère Marquis

The Ligue de Hockey Junior AA Saguenay-Lac-St-Jean or Saguenay-Lac-St-Jean Junior "AA" Hockey League is a Junior "AA" (Junior "B" Canada-Wide) ice hockey league in the Province of Quebec, Canada. The league is sanctioned by Hockey Quebec and Hockey Canada.

The champion of the league competes annually for the Coupe Dodge, the Provincial Championship of Quebec.

== Teams ==
Team	Centre
Alma Aiglons	Alma, Quebec
Chicoutimi Saguenéens	Chicoutimi, Quebec
Jonquiere Marquis	Jonquière, Quebec
Roberval Sabres	Roberval, Quebec
Normandin Eperviers	Normandin, Quebec

== Champions ==
- 2006 Jonquìère Marquis
- 2007 Normandin Éperviers
- 2008 Métabetchouan Royals
- 2009 La Baie National
- 2010 Jonquìère Marquis
- 2011 Jonquìère Marquis
- 2012 Jonquìère Marquis
- 2013 Normandin Éperviers
- 2014 Jonquìère Marquis
- 2015 Jonquìère Marquis
- 2016 Alma Aiglons
- 2017 Jonquière Marquis
- 2018 Jonquière Marquis
