= Chaudiere-Appalaches Junior AA Hockey League =

Junior ice hockey league in Quebec, Canada

- Sport: Ice hockey
- No. of teams: 12
- Countries: Canada
- Headquarters: Chaudière-Appalaches
- Most recent champion: Lotbinière Model

The Chaudiere-Appalaches Junior AA Hockey League is a junior ice hockey league in the Province of Quebec, Canada. The league is sanctioned by Hockey Quebec and Hockey Canada. Its champion competes each Spring for the Coupe Dodge.

== History ==
The CAJAAHL is based in the Chaudière-Appalaches area of Quebec.

The CAJAAHL was formerly known as the Beauce-Bellechase Junior AA League, but changed its name around 2007. At one point the league was known as the Beauce-Frontenac League.

== Teams ==
Chaudiere Division
Team
Centre
St-Georges Assurancia
Saint-Georges, Quebec
Beauce-Centre Bulldogs
Saint-Joseph-de-Beauce, Quebec
Disraeli Cité Construction
Disraeli, Quebec
Plessisville Boutin Express

Plessisville, Québec

Ste-Marie Beaucerons
Sainte-Marie, Quebec
Appalaches Division
Team
Centre
Bellechasse Lafontaine
Saint-Anselme, Quebec
Levis Levy Honda
Lévis, Quebec
Lotbiniere Model
Saint-Agapit, Quebec
Montmagny Caron Industries
Montmagny, Quebec
St-Romuald L'Expert
Lévis, Quebec

== Champions ==
Bolded denotes winner of Coupe Dodge as provincial champions.

- 2006 Levis Levy Honda
- 2007 Bellechasse Senateurs
- 2008 Bellechasse Senateurs
- 2009 St-Georges Cléri Sport
- 2010 Bellechasse Senateurs
- 2011 Levis Levy Honda
- 2012 Levis Levy Honda
- 2013 Ste-Marie Beaucerons
- 2014 Bellechasse Lafontaine
- 2015 **Bellechasse Lafontaine**
- 2016 Levis Levy Honda
- 2017 **Bellechasse Lafontaine**
- 2018 **Bellechasse Lafontaine**
- 2019 **Bellechasse Lafontaine**
- 2022 Lotbinière Model
- 2024 Plessisville V Boutin
