= Métropolitaine Junior AA Hockey League =

Ligue de Hockey Métropolitaine Junior AA
- Sport: Ice hockey
- Founded: 2012
- First season: 2012
- President: Pierre Côté
- No. of teams: 12
- Countries: Canada
- Headquarters: Laval, Quebec
- Most recent champion: Prédateurs de Brossard (2022)

The Ligue de Hockey Métropolitaine Junior AA is a junior ice hockey league in the Metropolitaine area of Montreal, Quebec province in Canada. The league is sanctioned by Hockey Quebec and Hockey Canada and competes annually for the Coupe Dodge. It also competes for the league' playoff trophy which is ''La Coupe Trévi''. There are now 9 teams playing in the league in 5 different regions of the province. Until 2012, the league was known as the Richelieu Junior AA Hockey League.

== History ==
In the Summer of 2012, the Richelieu Junior AA Hockey League changed its name to the Metropolitaine Junior AA Hockey League to reflect the diversity of teams that had entered the league. In the summer of 2018, the league expanded from 3 regions to 5 regions. Adding now Mauricie and Lac Saint-Louis in the league. In the summer of 2015, the league added a new rule that is, no hits are allowed in the centre of the ice, which decreases chances of injuries. That makes it the only league in the province with that rule.

In 2021 Laurentides-Launaudière League joined de LHMJAA. From this league two team joined: Monarques de Mirabel and Patriotes de Saint-Eustache.

== Teams ==
Team	City	Comments
Grands-Ducs du Richelieu	Varennes, Quebec	Move to Varennes in 2015
Prédateurs de Brossard	Brossard, Quebec	
Éclaireurs du Richelieu	Saint-Hyacinthe, Quebec	
Sénateurs de Laval	Laval, Quebec	
Royals de Montréal	Montreal, Quebec	
Mariniers de Sorel-Tracy	Sorel-Tracy, Quebec	New Team 2021-2022
Patriotes du Richelieu	Saint-Jean sur Richelieu, Quebec	New Team 2021-2022
Vipers D.D.O	Dollard-des-ormaux, Quebec	New Team 2018-2019
Mustangs de Vaudreuil	Vaudreuil, Quebec	Previously Aigles de trois lacs
Monarques de Mirabel	Mirabel, Quebec	New Team 2021-2022
Patriotes de Saint-Eustache	Saint-Eustache, Quebec	New Team 2021-2022
Braves de Valleyfield	Valleyfield, Quebec	New Team 2021-2022

== Old teams ==
Team	Centre	Last season
Draveurs de Trois-Rivières	Mauricie, Quebec	2019-2022
Dynamos de Shawinigan	Mauricie, Quebec	2019-2022
Delta Ducs	Laval, Quebec	2016-2017
Laval-Nord Cobras	Laval, Quebec	2016-2017
Longueuil College Francais	Longueuil, Quebec	2014-2015
Monteuil Eclairs	Auteuil, Quebec	2016-2017
Montreal Slammers	Montreal, Quebec	2011-2012
Montreal-Nord Nordiques	Montreal, Quebec	2015-2016
Chevaliers de Rosemont	Montreal, Quebec	2017-2018
Braves d'Ahuntsic	Montreal, Quebec	2017-2018
Richelieu Patriotes	Richelieu, Quebec	2015-2016 Back in the league in 2021
Marquis de Laval	Laval, Quebec	2018-2019
Sharp de l'est	Montreal, Quebec	2016-2017
Blitz Varennes-Sorel	Richelieu, Quebec	2011-2012
Maroons de Montréal	Montreal, Quebec	2011-2012
Mousquetaires de St-Hyacinthe	Richelieu, Quebec	2011-2012
Jets de Saint-Hubert	Richelieu, Quebec	2011-2012
Grands-Ducs de Boucherville	Richelieu, Quebec	2011-2012
Dynamiques du CCL	Richelieu, Quebec	2011-2012
Voyageurs du Richelieu	Richelieu, Quebec	2010-2011

== Playoff Champions ==
Bolded are winners of the Coupe Dodge Junior AA Provincial championship.

- 2006 Rive-Sud Collège Français
- 2007 **Montreal-Nord Nordiques**
- 2008 **Richelieu Eclaireurs**
- 2009 Grands-Ducs de Lajemmerais
- 2010 Montreal-Nord Nordiques
- 2011 Éclaireurs du Richelieu
- 2012 Mousquetaires de St-Hyacinthe
- 2013 Nordiques de Montréal-Nord
- 2014 Richelieu Patriots
- 2015 Richelieu Eclaireurs
- 2016 Richelieu Patriots
- 2017 Richelieu Eclaireurs
- 2018 Richelieu Grand Ducs
- 2019 Draveurs de Trois-Rivières
- 2020* No champions due to Coronavirus (Covid 19)
- 2021* No champions due to Coronavirus (Covid 19)
- 2022 Prédateurs de Brossard

== Season Champions ==
- 2013 Grands-Ducs du Richelieu
- 2014 Éclaireurs du Richelieu
- 2015 Patriotes du Richelieu
- 2016 Éclaireurs du Richelieu
- 2017 Éclaireurs du Richelieu
- 2018 Grands-Ducs du Richelieu
- 2019 Prédateurs de Brossard
- 2020 Prédateurs de Brossard
- 2021* No champions due to Coronavirus (Covid 19)
- 2022 Éclaireurs du Richelieu
