= Laurentides-Lanaudière Junior AA Hockey League =

- Sport: Ice hockey
- President: Réjean Trudeau
- Commissioner: Gilles Delorme
- No. of teams: 10
- Countries: Canada
- Headquarters: Mirabel, Quebec
- Most recent champion: Mirabel-Blainville Monarchs

The Laurentides-Lanaudière Junior AA Hockey League is a Canadian junior ice hockey league in the Laurentides and Lanaudière Regions of Quebec. The league is sanctioned by Hockey Quebec and Hockey Canada and its champions competes annually for the Coupe Dodge.

== History ==
=== 2008 Coupe Dodge Ram ===
The Repentigny Mustangs were the 2008 Laurentides-Lanaudriere Champions. The playoff victory gained them entry into the Coupe Dodge Ram. Unlike years before and after, Hockey Quebec elected to have two Junior AA championships and two champions in 2008. The Mustangs qualified for the "Ram" tournament and began by defeating Sept-Iles 6–1. In the next game they beat the Normandin Eperviers 5-4. Entering the quarter-final round, they ran into Sept-Iles again, this time crushing them 9–0. In the semi-finals, the Mustangs drew Baie-Comeau and beat them 7–1. The finals, saw a rematch between the Mustangs and the Eperviers where the Mustangs won 5–2 to become champions of Eastern Quebec.

=== 2009 Coupe Dodge ===
In 2009, the Moulins Garaga were the LLJAAHL playoff champions. The Garaga went to the Coupe Dodge tournament. In their first game, they defeated the Montreal-Est Federation 8–7. In their second game, they defeated the West Island Royals 5–4 and then beat the Trois-Pistoles Rebels 5–2. This got them to the quarter-final, where they beat the BCC Harfangs 5–1. In the semi-final, Garaga defeated Montreal-Est once again (3–1) to gain entry into the Provincial final. In the final, the Garaga faced the St-Cyrille Cyclones, who they beat 3–2 to win the Coupe Dodge as Quebec Junior AA champions.

=== 2012 Coupe Dodge ===
The 2012 LLJAAHL champions were the Lorraine-Rosemere Nationals. The Nationals travelled to Lachute, Quebec to compete for the Coupe Dodge provincial championship. Their first game was a tough 7–2 loss to the Montreal Nordiques. The Nationals next game was only marginally better, losing to the Jonquiere Marquis 7–5. The Nationals rebounded in their third preliminary game, defeating the Verdun/Lasalle Cobras 3–1. In the tournament quarter-final, the Nationals defeated the Quebec-Ouest Ambassadors 2–1. In the semi-final, Lorraine-Rosemere crushed La Vallee Draveurs 8–3 to get into the finals. The championship game saw the Nationals in a rematch against Jonquiere. This time, the Nationals dominated the Marquis, beating them 5–0 to win the Coupe Dodge as Quebec Junior AA champions.

== Teams ==
| Team | Centre |
| Boisbriand/Ste-Therese Royals | Boisbriand, Quebec |
| Lachute/Deux-Montagnes Knights | Lachute, Quebec |
| Lorraine-Rosemere Nationals | Lorraine, Quebec |
| Mirabel-Blainville Monarchs | Mirabel, Quebec |
| Mont-Laurier Rapids | Mont-Laurier, Quebec |
| Mont-Tremblant Devils | Mont-Tremblant, Quebec |
| Moulins Gladiators | Mascouche, Quebec |
| Repentigny Olympics | Repentigny, Quebec |
| St-Eustache Patriots | Saint-Eustache, Quebec |

== Champions ==
Bolded are the winners of the Coupe Dodge Quebec Junior AA Championship.

- 2006 St-Eustache Patriots
- 2007 Laval Ducs
- 2008 **Repentigny Mustangs**
- 2009 **Moulins Garaga**
- 2010 Lorraine-Rosemère Nationals
- 2011 St-Jerome Alouettes
- 2012 **Lorraine-Rosemère Nationals**
- 2013 St-Eustache Patriots
- 2014 Mirabel-Blainville Monarchs
- 2015 Moulins Gladiators
- 2016 Boisbriand/Ste-Therese Royals
- 2017 Joliette-Crabtree Cyclones
- 2018 Trois-Rivières Draveurs
