= Newfoundland Senior Hockey League (1962–1989) =

Newfoundland Senior Hockey League
| Membership | Newfoundland Amateur Hockey Association |
| Founded | 1962 |
| Ceased | 1989 |
| National Senior AAA champions (Allan Cup) | 1 (Corner Brook Royals), 1986 |
| National Senior AA champions (Hardy Cup) | 1 (Port aux Basques Mariners), 1989 |
| First Champion | Buchans Miners (1963) |
| Last Champion | Port aux Basques Mariners (1989) |

The Newfoundland Hockey League or Newfoundland Senior Hockey League (NSHL) was an island-wide league of senior hockey teams in Newfoundland that was founded in 1962. James J. Tobin was awarded the position of Honorary Secretary by the league for his contributions to hockey and sport in general, and held this position for more than 40 years. Champions are awarded the Herder Memorial Trophy.

The league was disbanded after the 1988–89 season with teams deep in debt and American Hockey League teams flooded the market.

On September 10, 2011, it was announced that a re-incarnation of the Newfoundland Senior Hockey League would start in the fall of 2011, seeing two teams from the AESHL (Conception Bay North Cee Bee Stars and Mount Pearl HJ Bartlett Electric Blades) combining with three teams from the WCSHL (Clarenville Caribous, Grand Falls-Windsor Cataracts and Corner Brook Royals).

Currently there are two regional senior A leagues, the Central West Senior Hockey League (CWSHL) and the Avalon East Senior Hockey League (AESHL).

== Trophies and awards ==
Note: Trophy's first season being awarded in brackets.

Team

- Herder Memorial Trophy - Playoff Champions (1934–35)
- Evening Telegram Trophy - Regular Season Champions (1962–63)

Player

- S. E Tuma Memorial Trophy - Top Scorer in Regular Season (1968–69)
- T.A. (Gus) Soper Memorial Award - MVP in Regular Season (1980–81)
- Cliff Gorman Memorial Award - Playoff MVP
- Hockey NL President's Goaltender's Award - Top Goaltender (1988–89)
- Albert "Peewee" Crane Memorial Trophy - Rookie of the Year (1968–69)
- Howie Clouter Memorial Trophy - Most Gentlemanly and Effective Player (1973–74)
- Top Defenseman
- Coach of the Year

=== Trophy and award winners 1962-1989 ===
Note: n/a = not awarded that season

| Season | First place regular season | Playoffs Champion | Top Scorer in Regular Season | MVP in Regular Season | Herder Playoffs MVP | Top Goaltender | Rookie of the Year | Most Gentlemanly and Effective Player |
|---|---|---|---|---|---|---|---|---|
| 1962–63 | Buchans Miners | Buchans Miners | Mike Kelly (Buchans) | n/a | | Bill Sullivan (CeeBees) | | n/a |
| 1963–64 | | | Don Barrett (Buchans) | | | | | |
| 1964–65 | | | Alex Faulkner (CeeBees) | | | | | |
| 1965–66 | | | Mike Kelly (Gander) | | | | | |
| 1966–67 | | | Mike Kelly (Gander) | | | | | |
| 1967–68 | | | Jacques Allard (Gander) | | | | | |
| 1968–69 | | | Jacques Allard (Gander) | | | | Terry French (Grand Falls) | |
| 1969–70 | | | | | | | | |
| 1970–71 | | | | | | | | |
| 1971–72 | | | | | | | | |
| 1972–73 | | | | | | | | |
| 1973–74 | | | | | | | | |
| 1974–75 | | | | | | | | |
| 1975–76 | | | | | | | | |
| 1976–77 | | | | | | | | |
| 1977–78 | | | | | | | | |
| 1978–79 | | | | | | | | |
| 1979–80 | | | | | | | | |
| 1980–81 | | | | | | | | |
| 1981–82 | | | | | | | | |
| 1982–83 | | | | | | | | |
| 1983–84 | | | | | | | | |
| 1984–85 | | | | | | | | |
| 1985–86 | | | | | | | | |
| 1986–87 | | | | | | | | |
| 1987–88 | | | | | | | | |
| 1988–89 | | | | | | | | |
