= 2025 Herder Memorial Final =

The 2025 Herder Memorial Final was the championship series of Newfoundland senior hockey's 2024–25 season and the culmination of the 2025 Herder Memorial playoffs. The Central West Senior Hockey League champion Deer Lake Red Wings defeated the Avalon East Senior Hockey League champion Clarenville Caribous four games to zero in the best-of-seven series, earning their third title in team history.

The series began in Deer Lake with games one and two at the Hodder Memorial Complex on March 28 and 29 and concluded in Clarenville with games four and five at the Eastlink Events Centre on April 4 and 5.

On April 5, after the Championship-winning game, Hockey NL Chair of Senior Hockey Gary Gale presented the Herder Memorial Trophy to Red Wings' captain Stephen Simms. Deer Lake goaltender Bryan Gillis was presented with the Cliff Gorman Memorial Award as the series MVP.

== Paths to the Final ==
=== Clarenville Caribous ===
The Caribous finished the season in fourth place in the Avalon East Senior Hockey League (AESHL) with a record of 8–9–3.

In the first round of the AESHL playoffs, Clarenville defeated the fifth place HGOE CeeBee Stars 2-games-to-0 in a best-of-three series. In the second round, the Caribous eliminated the first-place Baker's Flooring Conception Bay Blues 4-games-to-2 in a best-of-seven league semi-final.

In the league final, Clarenville defeated the second-place Puglisevich Southern Shore Breakers 4-games-to-1 and were awarded the Joe Maynard Trophy as the AESHL champion. The leading scorer in the 2025 AESHL playoffs was Clarenville's Adam Dawe with 18 points in 13 games (5G 8A).

=== Deer Lake Red Wings ===
The Red Wings finished in first place in the Central West Senior Hockey League 18-game regular season with a record of 13-3-2.

After eliminating the Stephenville Lightning in four straight games in the CWSHL semi-final, Deer Lake defeated the Grand Falls-Windsor Cataracts 4-games-to-2 in the best-of-seven league finals, winning their fourth Cliff Gorman Memorial Trophy.

== Game summaries ==
=== Game one ===
March 28	Clarenville Caribous	2-3	3OT	Deer Lake Red Wings	Hodder Memorial Complex

Scoring summary
Period	Team	Goal	Assist(s)	Time	Score
1st	CLA	Chad Earle	Thomas Hedges, Graham Oldford	11:34	1-0 CLA
1st	CLA	Adam Dawe	Unassisted	13:48	2-0 CLA
2nd	DRL	Brandon Hynes	Stephen Simms, Jacob Oake	15:37	2-1 CLA
3rd	DRL	Michael Hynes	Luke Robinson, Jacob Oake	01:49	2-2
OT	None				
2OT	None				
3OT	DRL	Kristopher Thomas	Lucas McKay, Jonny Anderson	04:42	3-2 DRL
Penalty summary
Period	Team	Player	Penalty	Time	PIM
1st	CLA	Andrew Mercer	Cross-checking	12:16	2:00
1st	CLA	Adam Dawe	Cross-checking	14:44	2:00
2nd	DRL	Drew Langdon	High Sticking	03:44	2:00
2nd	DRL	Reilly Mayne	Tripping	10:22	2:00
3rd	CLA	Patrick Farrell	Hooking	03:22	2:00
3rd	DRL	Reilly Mayne	Holding	08:28	2:00
3rd	CLA	Chad Earle	Cross-checking	10:28	2:00
OT	CLA	Adam Dawe	Roughing after whistle	08:40	2:00
OT	DRL	Lucas McKay	Roughing after whistle	08:40	2:00
2OT	None				
3OT	None				

Shots by period
Team	1	2	3	OT	Total
CLA	14	9	12	17	52
DRL	13	13	10	19	55

Penalties by period
Team	1	2	3	OT	Total
CLA	4	0	4	2	10
DRL	0	4	2	2	8

Note: SA = saves against. GA = goals against, SV = saves, SV% = save percentage, TOI = time on ice, PIM = penalty minutes

Goaltending
Team	Goaltender	SA	GA	SV	SV%	TOI	PIM
CLA	A.J. Whiffen	55	3	52	0.945	94:42	0
DRL	Bryan Gillis	52	2	50	0.962	94:42	0

=== Game Two ===
March 29	Clarenville Caribous	1-3	Deer Lake Red Wings	Hodder Memorial Complex

Scoring summary
Period	Team	Goal	Assist(s)	Time	Score
1st	DRL	Stephen Gillard	Matthew Grouchy, Cody Drover	11:04	1-0 DRL
2nd	CLA	Adam Dawe	Kevin Reid, Chad Earle	02:26	1-1
2nd	DRL	Cody Drover	Jordan Maher, Matthew Grouchy	06:33	2-1 DRL
3rd	DRL	Drew Langdon	Brandon Hynes	18:45	3-1 DRL
Penalty summary
Period	Team	Player	Penalty	Time	PIM
1st	CLA	Jacob Evans	Slashing	17:52	2:00
2nd	DRL	Lucas McKay	Boarding	03:44	2:00
2nd	CLA	Thomas Hedges	Hooking	11:50	2:00
2nd	DRL	Michael Hynes	High-sticking	19:31	2:00
2nd	CLA	Graham Oldford	Slashing	19:43	2:00
3rd	CLA	Justin Pender	Cross-checking	13:10	2:00
3rd	CLA	Thomas Hedges	Roughing after whistle	20:00	2:00

Shots by period
Team	1	2	3	Total
CLA	10	18	11	39
DRL	7	11	9	27

=== Game Three ===
April 4	Deer Lake Red Wings	1-0	Clarenville Caribous	Eastlink Events Centre

Scoring summary
Period	Team	Goal	Assist(s)	Time	Score
1st	DRL	Ryan Smith	Brandon Hynes, Drew Langdon	15:27	1-0 DRL
2nd	None				
3rd	None				
Penalty summary
Period	Team	Player	Penalty	Time	PIM
1st	None				
2nd	DRL	Bryan Gillis	Tripping	04:24	2:00
2nd	DRL	Drew Langdon	Closing Hand on Puck	06:22	2:00
3rd	CLA	Patrick Farrell	Cross-checking	09:12	2:00
3rd	CLA	Patrick Farrell	Slashing	13:11	2:00

Shots by period
Team	1	2	3	Total
DRL	10	4	8	22
CLA	9	12	5	26

=== Game Four ===
April 5	Deer Lake Red Wings	4-1	Clarenville Caribous	Eastlink Events Centre

Scoring summary
Period	Team	Goal	Assist(s)	Time	Score
1st	DRL	Brandon Hynes	Reilly Mayne, Stephen Simms	05:41	1-0 DRL
1st	CLA	Thomas Hedges	Kevin Reid, Adam Dawe	08:52	1-1
1st	DRL	Drew Langdon	Stephen Simms, Brandon Hynes	11:57	2-1 DRL
2nd	DRL	Reilly Mayne	Darren Langdon, Lucas McKay	20:00	3-1 DRL
3rd	DRL	Lucas McKay (EN)	Reilly Mayne, Lucas Robinson	18:10	4-1 DRL
Penalty summary
Period	Team	Player	Penalty	Time	PIM
1st	CAR	Jacob Evans	Hooking	05:21	2:00
1st	CAR	Mason Reid	Roughing	07:47	2:00
1st	DRL	Lucas McKay	Roughing	07:47	2:00
1st	CLA	Liam Leonard	Charging	11:27	2:00
1st	DRL	Josh Day	Cross Checking	13:35	2:00
1st	CLA	Justin Pender	Roughing	18:11	2:00
1st	CLA	Andrew Mercer	Roughing	18:11	2:00
1st	DRL	Reilly Mayne	Goaltender Interference	18:11	2:00
1st	DRL	Reilly Mayne	Roughing	18:11	2:00
1st	DRL	Drew Langdon	Roughing	18:11	2:00
2nd	DRL	Paul Hutchings	Jooking	02:37	2:00
2nd	DRL	Kevin Reid	Goaltender Interference	05:10	2:00
3rd	None				

Shots by period
Team	1	2	3	Total
DRL	8	19	7	34
CLA	9	8	9	26

== Player statistics ==
=== Skaters ===
These are the top ten skaters based on points.

Player	Team	GP	G	A	Pts	PIM
Brandon Hynes	Deer Lake Red Wings	4	2	3	5	
Drew Langdon	Deer lake Red Wings	4	2	2	4	
Reilly Mayne	Deer lake Red Wings	4	1	3	4	
Adam Dawe	Clarenville Caribous	4	2	1	3	
Lucas McKay	Deer Lake Red Wings	4	1	2	3	
Stephen Simms	Deer Lake Red Wings	4				
Cody Drover	Deer Lake Red Wings	4				
Chad Earle	Clarenville Caribous	4				
Thomas Hedges	Clarenville Caribous	4				
Matthew Grouchy	Deer Lake Red Wings	4				

=== Goaltenders ===
Player	Team	GP	W	L	SA	GA	GAA	SV%	SO	TOI
Bryan Gillis	Deer Lake Red Wings	4	4	0	143	4		0.972		
A.J. Whiffen	Clarenville Caribous	4	0	4	138	11		0.920		

== Team rosters ==
(work-in-progress)

=== Deer Lake Red Wings ===
#	Nat	Player	Position	Hand	Age	Acquired	Place of birth	Final appearance
72	(Canada)	Jonathan Anderson	LW	L	25	2023	Rocky Harbour, NL	second (2024)
32	(Canada)	Billy Clarke	G	R	31	2019	Dayspring, Nova Scotia	third (2023, 2024)
31	(Canada)	Bryan Gillis	G	L	36	2024	Elmsdale, Nova Scotia	second (2015)
91	(Canada)	Brandon Hynes	RW	R	32	2022	Norris Point, NL	third (2023, 2024)
89	(Canada)	Michael Hynes	C	L	34	2022	Norris Point, NL	fifth (2015, 2019, 2023, 2024)

=== Clarenville Caribous ===
#	Nat	Player	Position	Hand	Age	Acquired	Place of birth	Final appearance
29	(Canada)	A.J. Whiffen	G	L	35	2021	Grand Falls-Windsor, NL	seventh (2012, 2014, 2015, 2016, 2019, 2022)
