= List of Gander Flyers seasons =

The Gander Flyers (also commonly known as the Kelly Ford Gander Flyers due to a sponsorship deal beginning October 3, 2014) were a senior ice hockey team based in Gander, Newfoundland and Labrador and a member of in the Central West Senior Hockey League. Gander has been associated with Newfoundland senior hockey since 1947 when their first all-star team joined the Central Division of the Newfoundland Amateur Hockey Association.

== Table key ==
Key of terms and abbreviations
Term or abbreviation	Definition
Finish	Final position in division or league standings
GA	Goals against (goals scored by the Flyers' opponents)
GF	Goals for (goals scored by the Flyers)
GP	Number of games played
L	Number of losses
OTL	Number of losses in overtime
Pts	Number of points
T	Number of ties
TG	Two-game total goals series
W	Number of wins
—	Does not apply

== NAHA Central Division (1947-1953) ==
Note: GP = Games played, W = Wins, L = Losses, T = Ties, OTL = Overtime Losses, Pts = Points, GF = Goals for, GA = Goals against

NAHA = Newfoundland Amateur Hockey Association

Gander All-Stars exhibition games and playoffs statistics and results, 1947–1953
Season	League	Exhibition games									Playoffs					
Season	League	GP	W	L	T	OTL	GF	GA	PTS	Finish	GP	W	L	GF	GA	Result
1946-47	NAHA	—	—	—	—	—	—	—	—	—						
1947-48	NAHA	—	—	—	—	—	—	—	—	—						Lost in Central Division semi-finals to Buchans Miners, 0–2
1948-49	NAHA	—	—	—	—	—	—	—	—	—	2	0	2	5	15	Lost to Grand Falls All-Stars in Central Division finals, 0–2
1949-50	NAHA	—	—	—	—	—	—	—	—	—	2	0	2	8	24	Lost to Grand Falls All-Stars in Central Division semi-finals, 0–2
1950-51	NAHA	—	—	—	—	—	—	—	—	—	2	0	2	3	27	Lost to Buchans Miners in Central Division semi-finals, 0–2
1951-52	NAHA	—	—	—	—	—	—	—	—	—	2	0	2	3	17	Lost to Buchans Miners in Central Division semi-finals, 0–2
1952-53	NAHA	—	—	—	—	—	—	—	—	—	2	0	2	23	0	Lost to Grand Falls All-Stars in Central Division semi-finals, 0–2

=== Notes (1947–1953) ===
- From the winter of 1947 to the end of the 1949–50 season, Gander competed in the Central Division of the Newfoundland Senior League with Grand Falls, Buchans and Bishop's Falls. Beginning in 1950 and through the 1952–1953 season, Gander competed in the Western Division with Corner Brook, Buchans and Grand Falls. There was no regular season during this period. The all-stars played a series of exhibition games and then competed in pre-determined playoff format to decide the champions who would advance to the all-Newfoundland Herder finals against the Eastern champions.

== NAHA Section B (1953-1959) ==
Note: GP = Games played, W = Wins, L = Losses, T = Ties, OTL = Overtime Losses, Pts = Points, GF = Goals for, GA = Goals against

NAHA-B = Newfoundland Amateur Hockey Association Section B

Gander All-Stars exhibition games and playoffs statistics and results, 1953–1959
Season	League	Exhibition games									Playoffs					
Season	League	GP	W	L	T	OTL	GF	GA	PTS	Finish	GP	W	L	GF	GA	Result
1953-54	NAHA-B	—	—	—	—	—	—	—	—	—	5	3	2	16	20	Lost to Bell Island All-Stars in Section B finals, 1–2
1954-55	NAHA-B	—	—	—	—	—	—	—	—	—	2	0	2	14	7	Lost to Grand Falls Bees in Section B division finals, 0–2
1955-56	NAHA-B	—	—	—	—	—	—	—	—	—	—	—	—	—	—	Did not enter NAHA in 1955–56
1956-57	NAHA-B	—	—	—	—	—	—	—	—	—	2	0	2	4	8	Lost to Corner Brook in Section B division semi-finals
1957-58	NAHA-B	—	—	—	—	—	—	—	—	—	7	3	4	36	38	Lost to Grand Falls Bees in Section B division finals, 1–2
1958-59	NAHA-B	—	—	—	—	—	—	—	—	—	5	2	3	20	32	Lost to Grand Falls Bees in Section B semi-finals, 2–3

=== Notes (1953-1959) ===
- From 1953–54 to 1958–59, the Gander all-stars played in the Section B division of the Newfoundland Amateur Hockey Association where teams were not permitted to have paid import players on their rosters. With no regular season during this period, the all-stars played a series of exhibition games and then competed in the Section B playoffs for the Evening Telegram Trophy.
- The all-stars did not enter Section B playoffs in 1955–56. A new Gander Gardens was being built in the old RCAF Recreation Hall on Foss Avenue that would have Gander's first artificial ice surface. following the opening of the new Gardens in March, the All-Stars played a series of exhibition games with invited teams and re-joined Section B for 1956–57.

== NAHA Western Division (1959-1962) ==
Note: GP = Games played, W = Wins, L = Losses, T = Ties, OTL = Overtime Losses, Pts = Points, GF = Goals for, GA = Goals against

NAHA = Newfoundland Amateur Hockey Association

Gander Flyers exhibition games and playoffs statistics and results, 1959–1962
Season	League	Exhibition games									Playoffs					
Season	League	GP	W	L	T	OTL	GF	GA	PTS	Finish	GP	W	L	GF	GA	Result
1959-60	NAHA	—	—	—	—	—	—	—	—	—	12	3	9	0	6	3rd West Division, DNQ for Herder Finals
1960-61	NAHA	—	—	—	—	—	—	—	—	—	16	8	8	0	16	1st West Division, Lost Herder Finals to Conception Bay CeeBees, 0–4
1961-62	NAHA	—	—	—	—	—	—	—	—	—	—	—	—	—	—	—

- From 1959–60 to 1961–62, the Gander all-stars played in the Western Division of the Newfoundland Amateur Hockey Association. There were no regular season games during this period but a 12-game triple round-robin divisional playoffs. The first place team after the round robin playoffs played the Eastern Divisional playoffs champion in a 7-game Herder final series.

== NSHL (1962-1983) ==
Led league in points†	Herder Trophy champions‡

Note: GP = Games played, W = Wins, L = Losses, T = Ties, OTL = Overtime losses, Pts = Points, GF = Goals for, GA = Goals against, DNQ = Did not qualify, NSHL = Newfoundland Senior Hockey League

Gander Flyers regular season and postseason statistics and results, 1962–1983
Season	League	Regular season									Postseason					
Season	League	GP	W	L	T	OTL	GF	GA	PTS	Finish	GP	W	L	GF	GA	Result
1962-63	—	—	—	—	—	—	—	—	—	—	—	—	—	—	—	Did not enter NSHL in 1962–63
1963-64	NSHL	20	2	18	0	—	86	211	4	6th	—	—	—	—	—	DNQ for Herder playoffs
1964-65	NSHL	20	5	15	0	—	76	119	10	5th	—	—	—	—	—	DNQ for Herder playoffs
1965-66	NSHL	32	16	14	2	—	199	176	34	2nd	5	1	4	31	39	Lost Herder semi-finals 1–4 to Conception Bay CeeBees
1966-67	NSHL	40	26	3	1	—	213	160	53†	1st	10	2	8	42	46	Lost Herder finals 1–4 to Conception Bay CeeBees
1967-68	NSHL	40	10	28	2	—	184	180	22	6th	—	—	—	—	—	DNQ for Herder playoffs
1968-69	NSHL	40	27	10	3	—	243	173	57†	1st	10	8	2	65	28	Won Herder Memorial Trophy vs. Buchans Miners, 4-0‡
1969-70	NSHL	40	20	17	3	—	227	211	43	2nd	7	3	4	28	31	Lost Herder semi-finals 3–4 to Grand Falls Cataracts
1970-71	NSHL	36	14	20	2	—	157	187	30	4th	12	6	6	—	—	Finished in a tie for 3rd in the round robin Herder semi-final
1971-72	NSHL	36	18	15	3	—	190	198	39	2nd	8	1	7	—	—	Finished 3rd in round robin Herder semi-finals
1972-73	NSHL	36	12	23	1	—	142	209	25	4th	—	—	—	—	—	DNQ for round robin Herder semi-finals
1973-74	NSHL	32	8	20	4	—	125	216	20	4th	5	1	4	23	48	Lost Herder semi-finals 1–4 to Grand Falls Cataracts
1974-75	NSHL	—	—	—	—	—	—	—	—	—	—	—	—	—	—	Did not enter NSHL in 1974–75
1975-76	NSHL	—	—	—	—	—	—	—	—	—	—	—	—	—	—	Did not enter NSHL in 1975–76
1976-77	NSHL	32	20	10	2	—	206	164	42	2nd West Div.	—	—	—	—	—	—
1977-78	NSHL	32	23	8	1	—	233	146	47	1st West Div.	—	—	—	—	—	—
1978-79	NSHL	30	20	7	3	—	240	138	43†	1st	10	6	4	51	38	Lost Herder finals 3–4 to Mike's Shamrocks
1979-80	NSHL	34	25	7	2	—	228	139	52†	1st	9	7	2	52	31	Won Herder Memorial Trophy vs. Labatt BlueCaps, 4-2‡
1980-81	NSHL	—	—	—	—	—	—	—	—	—	—	—	—	—	—	Did not enter NSHL in 1980–81
1981-82	NSHL	32	21	10	1	—	192	151	43†	1st	—	—	—	—	—	Lost Herder Finals 3–4 to Grand Falls Cataracts
1982-83	NSHL	6	—	—	—	—	—	—	—	Did not finish season	—	—	—	—	—	—

== CBSHL/AWSHL (1983-1996) ==
Note: GP = Games played, W = Wins, L = Losses, T = Ties, OTL = Overtime Losses, Pts = Points, GF = Goals for, GA = Goals against

CBSHL = Central Beothuck Senior Hockey League, AWSHL = Avalon West Senior Hockey League

Gander Flyers regular season and postseason statistics and results, 1983–1996
Season	League	Regular season									Postseason					
Season	League	GP	W	L	T	OTL	GF	GA	PTS	Finish	GP	W	L	GF	GA	Result
1983-84	CBSHL	—	—	—	—	—	—	—	—	—	—	—	—	—	—	—
1990-91	CBSHL	—	—	—	—	—	—	—	—	—	—	—	—	—	—	—
1991-92	CBSHL	—	—	—	—	—	—	—	—	—	—	—	—	—	—	—
1992-93	CBSHL	—	—	—	—	—	—	—	—	1st	—	—	—	—	—	Won CBSHL championship 4-1 vs. Badger Bombers, lost Herder finals 2–3 to Flatrock Flyers
1993-94	CBSHL	—	—	—	—	—	—	—	—	—	—	—	—	—	—	—
1994-95	AWSHL	—	—	—	—	—	—	—	—	—	—	—	—	—	—	—
1995-96	CBSHL	—	—	—	—	—	—	—	—	—	—	—	—	—	—	—

== CNHL (2009-2012) ==
Note: GP = Games played, W = Wins, L = Losses, T = Ties, OTL = Overtime Losses, Pts = Points, GF = Goals for, GA = Goals against

CNHL = Central Newfoundland Hockey League

Gander Flyers regular season and postseason statistics and results, 2009–2012
Season	League	Regular season									Postseason					
Season	League	GP	W	L	T	OTL	GF	GA	PTS	Finish	GP	W	L	GF	GA	Result
2009–10	CNHL									1st	3	1	2	—	—	Lost finals to Twillingate Combines
2010-11	CNHL	10	4	6	0	0	38	44	8	3rd	5	2	3	—	—	Lost semi-finals to Wesleyville Beothics, 2–3
2011–12	CNHL	11	8	3	0	—	59	31	16	1st	8	5	3	—	—	Lost finals to Straight Shore Beothics, 2–3

- For three seasons the Flyers played in a league that was not eligible for Herder Competition.

== NSHL/CWSHL (2012-present) ==
Note: GP = Games played, W = Wins, L = Losses, T = Ties, OTL = Overtime Losses, Pts = Points, GF = Goals for, GA = Goals against

NSHL = Newfoundland Senior Hockey League, CWSHL = Central West Senior Hockey League, NSHL = Newfoundland Senior Hockey League Central Division

Gander Flyers regular season and postseason statistics and results, 2012–present
Season	League	Regular season									Postseason					
Season	League	GP	W	L	T	OTL	GF	GA	PTS	Finish	GP	W	L	GF	GA	Result
2012–13	NSHL	23	4	16	—	3	81	117	11	5th	—	—	—	—	—	DNQ for Herder playoffs
2013-14	NSNL	24	7	14	—	3	76	121	17	6th	3	0	3			Lost quarter-finals to Corner Brook Royals, 0–3
2014-15	CWSHL	24	8	14	—	2	67	107	18	4th	4	0	4	4	19	Lost Herder semi-finals to Corner Brook Royals, 0–4
2015-16	CWSHL	22	7	12	-	3	74	93	17	4th	5	1	4	9	28	Lost in CWSHL semi-finals to Grand Falls-Windsor Cataracts, 1–4
2016-17	CWSHL	14	3	9	-	2	45	73	8	3rd	2	0	2	10	14	Lost in CWSHL semi-finals to Clarenville Caribous, 0–2
2017-18	CWSHL	16	9	6	-	1	75	70	19	1st	5	1	4	20	29	Lost in CWSHL finals to Clarenville Caribous, 1–4
2018-19	NSHL-C															Lost in Central Division finals to Grand Falls-Windsor Cataracts, 2-4
