= Gander Flyers =

Canadian ice hockey team

- City: Gander, NL
- League: Central West Senior Hockey League
- Founded: 1947
- Home arena: Steele Community Centre
- Colours: Purple, Gold
- Head coach: Rick Sheppard
- Captain: Jordan Escott
- Website: Flyers on League website

Franchise history
- 1948–61: Gander All-Stars
- 1961-2019: Gander Flyers

The Gander Flyers (also commonly known as the Kelly Ford Gander Flyers due to a sponsorship deal that began October 3, 2014) were a senior ice hockey team based in Gander, Newfoundland and Labrador and a member of the Central West Senior Hockey League.

== History ==
The Gander Flyers hockey club has its roots in picked teams from the Royal Canadian Air Force hockey league at RCAF Station Gander during the Second World War and from the Gander Hockey League picked team that entered Newfoundland inter-town senior hockey competition in 1947. The RCAF 'Bombers' and 'Fliers' played exhibition games at other Newfoundland hockey centres during World War II including Corner Brook and Grand Falls.

Gander first joined the Newfoundland Amateur Hockey Association, and the race for the Herder Memorial Trophy, in 1947 as part of the Central Division with teams from Bishop's Falls, Buchans and Grand Falls.

Gander's entry into Newfoundland senior hockey was occasionally nicknamed the 'Flyers' until an official name change in the early 1960s. From 1953 to 1959, Gander entered a team in provincial Section B senior hockey in competition for the Evening Telegram Trophy. The all-stars were finalists in the 1954 all-Newfoundland senior 'B' championships hosted by Grand Falls but lost the close series to the Bell Island All-Stars 2-games-to-1. In 1960, the all-stars became part of the Western Division and in 1963 Gander joined the province-wide Newfoundland Senior Hockey League (NSHL). In 1967, Flyers' import goaltender Lyle Carter was invited by the Conception Bay CeeBees to play in the Allan Cup; Carter later went on to play 15 NHL games with the California Golden Seals in 1971-72.

The Flyers were part of the NSHL, with the exception of a two-year break in the mid-1970s, until the hockey club folded in 1983. The Gander Flyers started the 1982-83 season but folded at the end of November.

Gander didn't enter a team in the NSHL for the 1974-75 and 1975-76 seasons. In 1975, Flyers alumni formed the Intermediate 'B' Gander Lakers and joined the Central Intermediate B Hockey League. The Lakers team became the re-formed Flyers and joined the Newfoundland Senior League for the 1976-77 season. After the team folded in November 1983, Flyers alumni re-formed the Gander Lakers and joined the Central Beothuck Intermediate Hockey League for the 1983-84 season.

The Flyers made their first all-Newfoundland finals appearance in 1961] but lost to the Conception Bay CeeBees in four straight games. Gander won its first NSHL championship and Herder Memorial Trophy in 1969 and added a second title in 1980. The club sat out the 1980-81 season but rejoined in 1981-82, making it to another Herder Finals but lost in seven games. It was the Flyers' fourth finals appearance in five seasons.

For the 2009-10 season, the Flyers returned as one of three teams that formed the Central Newfoundland Intermediate Hockey League (CNIHL). The Gander "Rec" Flyers played for three seasons in the CNIHL until 2012. After a 16-year absence from Newfoundland Senior hockey, the Gander Flyers joined the re-formed Newfoundland Senior Hockey League (NSHL) in the fall of 2012. The team's home ice was at the Gander Community Centre.

On June 4, 2014, the Flyers were one of four teams that announced their departure from the Newfoundland Senior Hockey League in order to form a new league to be the Central West Senior Hockey League. That year the Flyers didn't score highly in the league standings, although early 2015 results were better. Also in 2014, the Flyers were in the news when their goaltender Patrick O'Brien, a trained paramedic, ran from the locker room wearing all of his equipment to give CPR and helped to save the life of a fan in the stands as the game was about to begin.

In 2015, the Flyers signed former National Hockey League player, Arron Asham.

== Seasons and records ==
=== Season-by-season results ===
For the full season-by-season history, see List of Gander Flyers seasons.

Below is a list of the last three seasons completed by the Gander Flyers.

Note: GP = Games played, W = Wins, L = Losses, T = Ties, OTL = Overtime Losses, Pts = Points, GF = Goals for, GA = Goals against, DNQ = Did not qualify

NSHL = Newfoundland Senior Hockey League, CWSHL = Central West Senior Hockey League, NSHL-C = Newfoundland Senior Hockey League Central Division

Gander Flyers regular season and postseason statistics and results, 2012–present
Season	League	Regular season									Postseason					
Season	League	GP	W	L	T	OTL	GF	GA	PTS	Finish	GP	W	L	GF	GA	Result
2016-17	CWSHL	14	3	9	-	2	45	73	8	3rd	2	0	2	10	14	Lost in CWSHL semi-finals to Clarenville Caribous, 0-2
2017-18	CWSHL	16	9	6	-	1	75	70	19	1st	5	1	4	20	29	Lost in CWSHL finals to Clarenville Caribous, 1-4
2018-19	NSHL-C															Lost in Central Division finals to Grand Falls-Windsor Cataracts, 2-4

== Allan Cup results ==
Season	Location	GP	W	L	T	OTL	GF	GA	Results	Playoffs
1969	Galt, ON (Games 1,2), Gander, NL (Games 3,4,5)	5	4	1	0	0	17	28		Lost 1-4 Eastern semi-finals (Galt Hornets)
1980		3	0	3	-	-	7	29		Lost 0-3 Eastern semi-finals (Thunder Bay Twins)

== Current roster ==
For the current team roster see the Flyers profile on the league website

== Leaders ==
=== Team captains ===
- John Murphy, 1958–59
- Bill Ireland, 1960-61
- Dick Power, 1966–67
- Harry Katrynuk, 1968–69
- Jack Faulkner, 1971-72
- Bruce Sparkes, 1979–80
- Peter Campbell, 2013–14
- Ray Dalton, 2014–15
- Mike Dyke, 2015–16
- Mitchell Oake, 2016-18
- Jordan Escott, 2018-Present

=== Head coaches ===
- Wes Trainor, 1958–61
- Cy Hoskins(playing-coach), 1963
- Jacques Allard (playing-coach)
- Wayne Maxner
- Bob Sheppard, 1978-79
- Jack Faulkner, 1979-1980
- Dennis Laing, 2012–14
- Chris Peach, 2014–15
- Ben Fitzgerald, 2015–16
- Ryan Power, 2016
- Rick Sheppard, 2017-2019

== Team awards ==
Most Valuable Player

- Tyler Carroll, 2017
- Jordan Escott, 2018
- Jordan Escott, 2019

Terry Oake Heart & Soul Award

- Mitchell Oake, 2017
- Paul Hutchings, 2018
- Thomas Hedges, 2019

Dedication Award

- Evan Mosher, 2019

== League trophies and awards ==
Leading Scorer

- Jordan Escott, 2018
- Jordan Escott, 2019

Rookie of the Year

- Andrew Ryan, 2016
- Brad Power, 2018
- Jonathan Coffey, 2019

Most Gentlemanly and Effective Player

- Jordan Escott, 2017

Coach of the Year

- Rick Sheppard, 2018

League MVP

- Jordan Escott, 2018
- Jordan Escott, 2019

== Hockey NL (HNL) trophies and awards ==
=== HNL Team awards ===
- Two all-Newfoundland senior hockey championships (Herder Memorial Trophy): 1969, 1980
- First place in the Newfoundland Senior Hockey League (Evening Telegram Trophy):

=== HNL Individual awards ===
S. E. Tuma Memorial Trophy (Top scorer in the regular season)

- Mike Kelly, 1966 (91 pts)
- Mike Kelly, 1967 (92 pts)
- Jacques Allard, 1968 (131 pts)
- Jacques Allard, 1969 (126 pts))
- Jack Faulkner, 1971 (74 pts)
- Wayne Maxner, 1972 (111 pts)
- Denis Goulding, 1977 (91 pts)
- Edward Philpott, 1979 (126 pts)
- Zane Forbes, 1980 (94 pts)

President's Top Goaltender Award

- Lyle Carter, 1967 (3.89 GAA)
- Kevin Kelly 1980 (3.55 GAA)

Albert "Pee Wee" Crane Memorial Award" (Rookie of the year)

- Zane Forbes, 1978
- Jim Mercer, 1982
- Derek Dalley, 1988
- Andrew Ryan, 2016

Howie Clouter Memorial Trophy (Most gentlemanly and effective player)

- Tom Rafuse, 1977
- Ted Mercer, 1978
- Ed Philpott, 1979
- Tom Rafuse, 1980
- Jordan Escott, 2017

Cliff Gorman Memorial Award (Most valuable player of the Herder Playoffs)

- Zane Forbes, 1982

== Honoured members ==
=== Retired numbers ===
Note: the year of number retirement is noted

- #16 Ed Philpott (2017)

=== NL Hockey Hall of Fame ===
The following people associated with the Flyers have been inducted into the Newfoundland and Labrador Hockey Hall of Fame (NLHHOF).
Note: the year of induction into NLHHOF is noted

- John Murphy (1995)
- Jack Faulkner (1995)
- Mike Kelly (1999)
- Ed Philpott (2000)
- Jacques Allard (2001)
- Dick Power (2001)
- Claude Brown (2004)
- Harry Katrynuk (2007)
- Leo Kane (2007)
- J.C. Garneau (2014)
