= Darren Langdon =

Canadian ice hockey player, coach (born 1971)

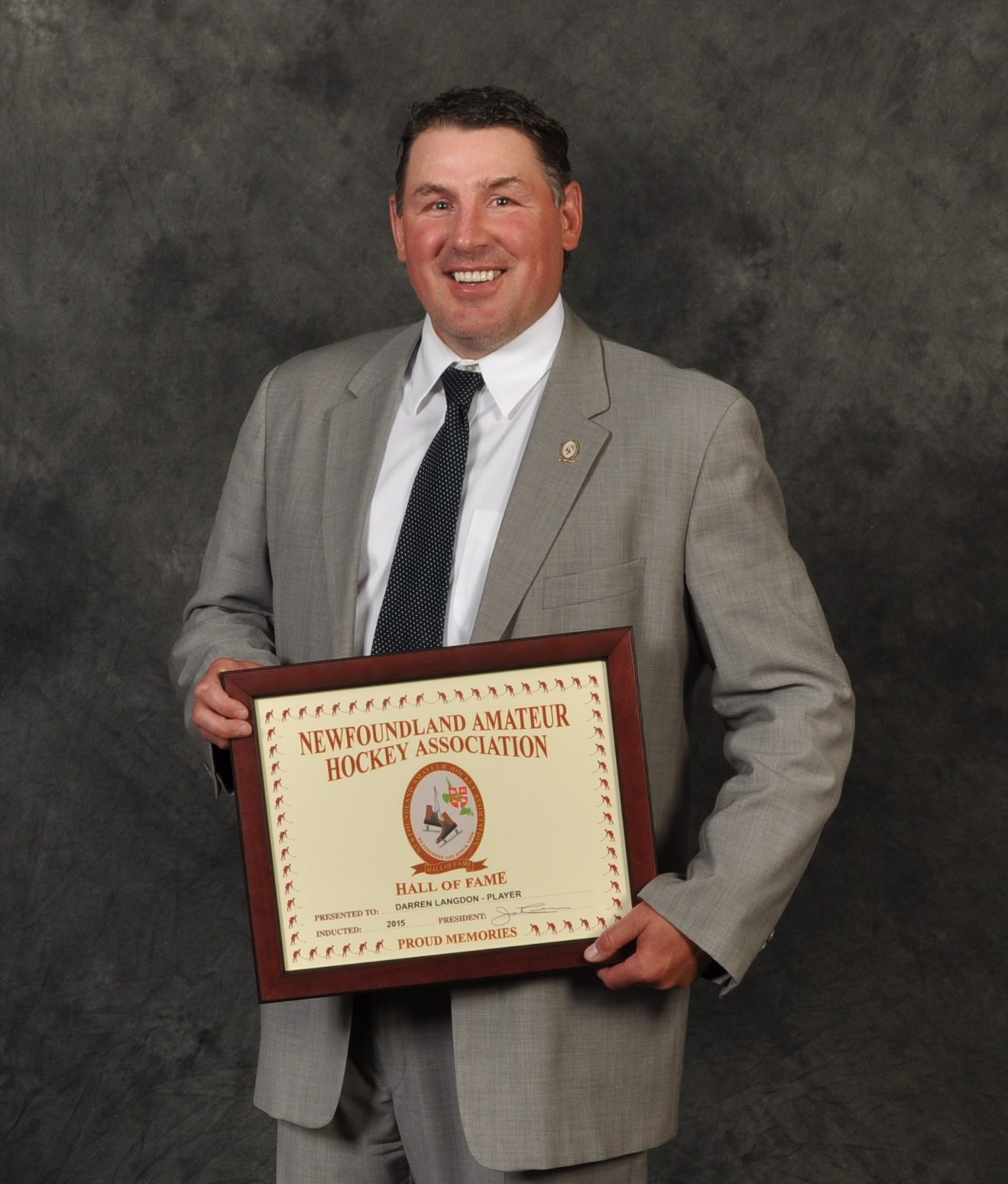
- Langdon at his induction into the Newfoundland and Labrador Hockey Hall of Fame
- Born: January 8, 1971 (age 55) Deer Lake, Newfoundland, Canada
- Height: 6 ft 1 in (185 cm)
- Weight: 205 lb (93 kg; 14 st 9 lb)
- Position: Left wing
- Shot: Left
- Played for: New York Rangers; Carolina Hurricanes; Vancouver Canucks; Montreal Canadiens; New Jersey Devils
- Playing career: 1992–2006

Darren Michael Langdon (born January 8, 1971) is a Canadian professional ice hockey coach and former player. Undrafted, he signed his first professional contract in 1993 with the New York Rangers. After retiring from the National Hockey League (NHL), Langdon coached a former team, the Deer Lake Red Wings of the Newfoundland Senior Hockey League (NSHL). While playing in the NHL, Langdon was best known for his fighting ability as an enforcer.

== Playing career ==
Langdon began his professional career with the Dayton Bombers of the ECHL, where he held the record for most penalty minutes in a season. He then played with Binghamton Rangers of the American Hockey League (AHL), the farm team for the New York Rangers.

Langdon played in 521 NHL games. His NHL totals were 16 goals and 23 assists for 39 points and 1,251 penalties in minutes, with more than half coming in fighting majors. He played for the New York Rangers, Montreal Canadiens, New Jersey Devils, Carolina Hurricanes and Vancouver Canucks. Langdon was selected in 1996 and 1997 as winner of the Rangers' Players’ Player Award, voted on by his teammates.

Langdon retired from playing in the senior hockey circuit at age 43 after eight seasons to move behind the bench as coach of the Corner Brook Royals. Langdon has also played with the Deer Lake Red Wings of the WCSHL and played one season with the Summerside Western Capitals in the Maritime Junior A Hockey League. He played for and coached Deer Lake during the 2004–05 NHL lockout and helped the club to a Herder Memorial Trophy.

In 2015, Langdon was inducted into the Newfoundland and Labrador Hockey Hall of Fame.

=== Fighting ===
During Langdon's time in New York he often worked protecting star Wayne Gretzky. He was primarily a second half fighter who would dodge the first 10–15 punches before unloading.

Some significant feats of Langdon's fighting career include:

- A rivalry with Toronto Maple Leafs player Tie Domi. They fought a total of four times.
- Two bouts with "Bruise Brothers" member Bob Probert.
- Four fights with Zdeno Chára of the New York Islanders and Ottawa Senators.

== Personal life ==
Langdon and his wife were married in 1997. They have four children, three of them being triplets. The Langdons reside in Deer Lake, Newfoundland and Labrador, where Langdon coaches his sons and their high school ice hockey team, the Elwood Regional High Lakers. He is also the minor ice hockey coach for their midget team. In 2007, Langdon stood for nomination as the Progressive Conservative candidate in a February 2007 by-election in the Humber Valley district. He opened Langer's, a bar decorated with his hockey memorabilia in Deer Lake. Some of the memorabilia include three Wayne Gretzky sticks, a signed no. 99 jersey, multiple pucks. and items from every one of his former New York teammates. He was affectionately called a weasel because of the sheer magnitude of items he had collected. He comes from a large family; his father is from a family of 17, his mother, a family of 13.

== Career statistics ==
=== Regular season and playoffs ===
			Regular season					Playoffs
Season	Team	League	GP	G	A	Pts	PIM	GP	G	A	Pts	PIM
1991–92	Summerside Western Capitals	IJHL	44	34	49	83	441	—	—	—	—	—
1992–93	Dayton Bombers	ECHL	54	23	22	45	429	3	0	1	1	40
1992–93	Binghamton Rangers	AHL	18	3	4	7	115	8	0	1	1	14
1993–94	Binghamton Rangers	AHL	54	2	7	9	327	—	—	—	—	—
1994–95	Binghamton Rangers	AHL	55	6	14	20	296	11	1	3	4	84
1994–95	New York Rangers	NHL	18	1	1	2	62	—	—	—	—	—
1995–96	Binghamton Rangers	AHL	1	0	0	0	12	—	—	—	—	—
1995–96	New York Rangers	NHL	64	7	4	11	175	2	0	0	0	0
1996–97	New York Rangers	NHL	60	3	6	9	195	10	0	0	0	2
1997–98	New York Rangers	NHL	70	3	3	6	197	—	—	—	—	—
1998–99	New York Rangers	NHL	44	0	0	0	80	—	—	—	—	—
1999–00	New York Rangers	NHL	21	0	1	1	26	—	—	—	—	—
2000–01	Carolina Hurricanes	NHL	54	0	2	2	94	4	0	0	0	12
2001–02	Carolina Hurricanes	NHL	58	2	1	3	106	—	—	—	—	—
2002–03	Carolina Hurricanes	NHL	9	0	0	0	16	—	—	—	—	—
2002–03	Vancouver Canucks	NHL	45	0	1	1	143	—	—	—	—	—
2003–04	Montreal Canadiens	NHL	64	0	3	3	135	9	1	0	1	6
2005–06	New Jersey Devils	NHL	14	0	1	1	22	—	—	—	—	—
2008–09	Deer Lake Red Wings	WCSHL	24	8	14	22	89	13	3	8	11	53
2009–10	Deer Lake Red Wings	WCSHL	23	8	16	24	87	4	1	1	2	29
2010–11	Deer Lake Red Wings	WCSHL	10	1	11	12	26	—	—	—	—	—
2011–12	Corner Brook Royals	NSHL	22	5	12	17	77	5	0	2	2	8
2012–13	Western Royals	NSHL	21	10	16	26	79	5	3	2	5	18
2013–14	Western Royals	NSHL	19	7	10	17	23	—	—	—	—	—
NHL totals			521	16	23	39	1251	25	1	0	1	20
