= Keith Kinkaid =

American ice hockey player (born 1989)

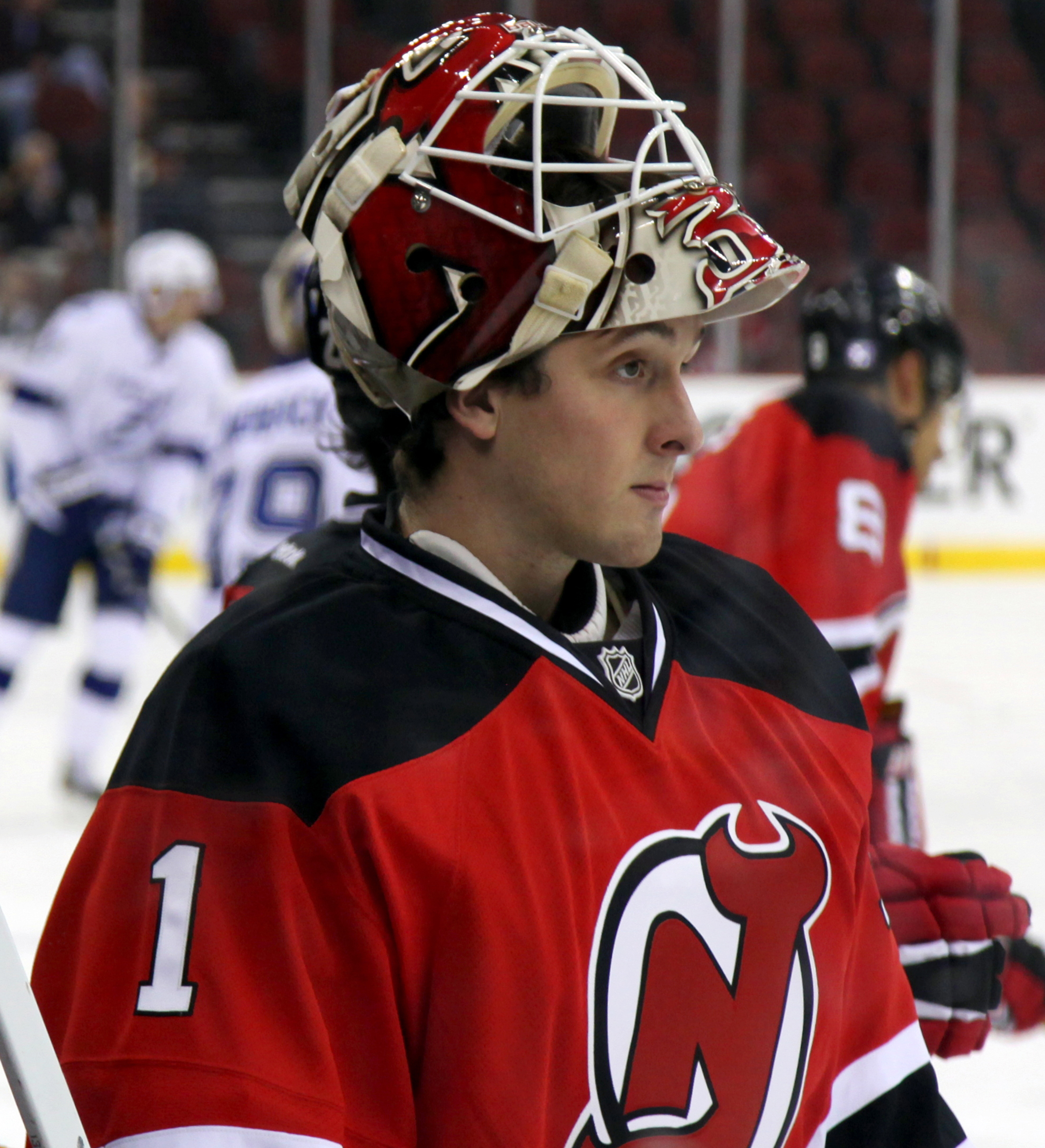
- Kinkaid with the Devils in 2013
- Born: July 4, 1989 (age 37) Farmingville, New York, U.S.
- Height: 6 ft 3 in (191 cm)
- Weight: 190 lb (86 kg; 13 st 8 lb)
- Position: Goaltender
- Catches: Left
- CWSHL team Former teams: Deer Lake Red Wings; New Jersey Devils; Montreal Canadiens; New York Rangers; Boston Bruins; Colorado Avalanche
- National team: United States
- NHL draft: Undrafted
- Playing career: 2011–present

Keith Patrick Kinkaid (born July 4, 1989) is an American professional ice hockey goaltender who is currently playing for the Deer Lake Red Wings of the Central West Senior Hockey League (CWSHL). Originally undrafted by teams in the National Hockey League (NHL), Kinkaid has previously played for the New Jersey Devils, Montreal Canadiens, New York Rangers, Boston Bruins, and Colorado Avalanche.

== Playing career ==
Born and raised in Farmingville, New York, Kinkaid graduated from Sachem High School East in 2007.

Kinkaid played for the St. Louis Bandits of the North American Hockey League for the 2008–09 season. In February 2009, Kinkaid committed to play NCAA Division I hockey for Union College. That April, Kinkaid was named MVP and Goaltender of the Year after he led all NAHL goaltenders in wins, goals-against average, save percentage and shutouts. He was also nominated for the Dave Tyler Junior Player of the Year Award.

=== College ===
Kinkaid played for Union College of ECAC Hockey from 2009 to 2011. In his freshman season, Kinkaid was named to the ECAC All-Rookie Team and Third Team.

After an outstanding sophomore season in which Kinkaid posted a 25–10–3 record and led the Dutchmen to their first NCAA tournament appearance, Kinkaid was named an AHCA East First-Team All-American. He was also named to the All-ECAC Hockey First Team and awarded the Ken Dryden Award as the best goaltender in the ECAC.

Kinkaid signed an entry-level contract with the New Jersey Devils in April 2011 after his sophomore season with Union.

=== Professional ===
Kinkaid was assigned to the Devils' American Hockey League affiliate, the Albany Devils, for the 2011–12 season. He made his professional debut on October 9, 2011, in a 4–2 loss to the Bridgeport Sound Tigers. On October 14, Kinkaid earned his first career win in a 3–2 shootout over the Connecticut Whale. During that October, Kinkaid was recalled to the NHL to play as a backup for Johan Hedberg. However, Kinkaid did not play during the 6 games he was up for and he was returned to Albany without making his NHL debut. In his second game back in the AHL, Kinkaid recorded his first professional shutout against the Norfolk Admirals.

In the final stages of the 2012–13 season, Kinkaid was recalled from Albany, and made his NHL debut in a relief role with New Jersey on March 5, 2013, against the Tampa Bay Lightning at the Prudential Center. He spent the entirety of the following season with the Albany Devils before being recalled in 2014.

On June 29, 2017, Kinkaid re-signed with the Devils. In the 2017–18 season, after starter Cory Schneider suffered a groin injury on January 23, Kinkaid eventually served as the starter, and performed well, posting a 2.77 GAA. and a .913 save percentage. On April 5, 2018, Kinkaid made 30 saves to help the Devils beat the Toronto Maple Leafs and clinch their first playoff spot since 2012.

In the following 2018–19 season, on February 25, 2019, Kinkaid was traded to the Columbus Blue Jackets in exchange for a 2022 fifth-round draft pick. Acquired for added insurance to the Blue Jackets' Sergei Bobrovsky and Joonas Korpisalo, Kinkaid remained on the roster as the third choice goaltender and did not make an appearance with Columbus.

As a free agent from the Blue Jackets, Kinkaid was signed to a one-year, $1.75 million contract with the Montreal Canadiens on July 1, 2019. After playing six games for the Canadiens, and posting a .875 save percentage, Kinkaid was placed on waivers on December 2. After going unclaimed off waivers, he was assigned to the Canadiens' AHL affiliate, the Laval Rocket. In his first return to the AHL since the 2014–15 season, Kinkaid collected just 3 wins in 13 games with the Rocket. On February 29, 2020, Kinkaid was reassigned on loan by the Canadiens to the Charlotte Checkers of the AHL, the primary affiliate of the Carolina Hurricanes.

Kinkaid left the Canadiens organization after his lone season with the club, and was signed as a free agent to a two-year, $1.65 million contract with the New York Rangers on October 9, 2020. Kinkaid made his Rangers debut on March 7, 2021, in the Rangers' 5–1 loss to the Pittsburgh Penguins.

As a free agent from the Rangers, Kinkaid was signed to a one-year, two-way contract with the Boston Bruins on July 13, 2022. In the 2022–23 season, Kinkaid was reassigned to AHL affiliate, the Providence Bruins. On November 2, 2022, Kinkaid was recalled from Providence, following a lower body injury to Jeremy Swayman. He made his Bruins debut, collecting 30 saves, in a 3–1 victory over the Buffalo Sabres on November 12, 2022. Returned to the AHL following his lone appearance with Boston, Kinkaid earned 8 wins through 20 appearances with Providence.

On February 25, 2023, Kinkaid was traded by the Bruins to the Colorado Avalanche in exchange for Shane Bowers. Acquired to add positional depth to the Avalanche organization, Kinkaid was immediately assigned to AHL affiliate, the Colorado Eagles. Before he featured with the Eagles, Kinkaid was promptly recalled to the Avalanche and made his lone appearance in relief of Alexander Georgiev in a 7–3 defeat to the Dallas Stars on March 4, 2023. He later returned to the Eagles and played in 7 regular season games before ending the season on the Avalanche playoff roster.

As a free agent Kinkaid left the Avalanche and opted to sign a one-year contract with the lone AHL independent club, the Chicago Wolves, on July 18, 2023. Before playing a game for Chicago, however, Kinkaid signed a one-year, two-way contract to return to the New Jersey Devils on September 13. On October 18, Kinkaid was assigned to the Chicago Wolves after clearing waivers.

Kinkaid signed a professional tryout contract with the New York Islanders before the start of 2024 training camp. The team Kinkaid supported growing up. The Islanders released Kinkaid on October 2. Kinkaid then immediately signed a one-year contract with Charlotte Checkers of the AHL, and played the entirety of the 2024–25 season in the ECHL with affiliate, the Savannah Ghost Pirates.

== Career statistics ==
=== Regular season and playoffs ===
			Regular season									Playoffs
Season	Team	League	GP	W	L	OTL	MIN	GA	SO	GAA	SV%	GP	W	L	MIN	GA	SO	GAA	SV%
2007–08	New York Bobcats	AJHL	28	20	5	3	1,458	58	3	2.39	.935	—	—	—	—	—	—	—	—
2007–08	Des Moines Buccaneers	USHL	15	4	9	2	844	48	0	3.41	.893	—	—	—	—	—	—	—	—
2008–09	St. Louis Bandits	NAHL	40	30	5	4	2,393	71	7	1.78	.936	12	10	2	728	14	3	1.15	.951
2009–10	Union College	ECAC	25	12	8	3	1,478	61	1	2.48	.912	—	—	—	—	—	—	—	—
2010–11	Union College	ECAC	38	25	10	3	2,265	75	3	1.99	.920	—	—	—	—	—	—	—	—
2011–12	Albany Devils	AHL	42	17	20	3	2,347	115	3	2.94	.904	—	—	—	—	—	—	—	—
2012–13	Albany Devils	AHL	45	21	17	6	2,644	120	2	2.72	.905	—	—	—	—	—	—	—	—
2012–13	New Jersey Devils	NHL	1	0	0	0	26	1	0	2.31	.923	—	—	—	—	—	—	—	—
2013–14	Albany Devils	AHL	43	24	13	5	2,519	96	4	2.29	.912	4	1	3	238	9	0	2.26	.932
2014–15	Albany Devils	AHL	13	7	2	3	713	26	1	2.19	.923	—	—	—	—	—	—	—	—
2014–15	New Jersey Devils	NHL	19	6	5	4	925	40	0	2.59	.915	—	—	—	—	—	—	—	—
2015–16	New Jersey Devils	NHL	23	9	9	1	1,241	58	2	2.81	.904	—	—	—	—	—	—	—	—
2016–17	New Jersey Devils	NHL	26	8	13	3	1,485	65	1	2.64	.916	—	—	—	—	—	—	—	—
2017–18	New Jersey Devils	NHL	41	26	10	3	2,298	106	1	2.77	.913	2	0	2	202	9	0	5.87	.804
2018–19	New Jersey Devils	NHL	41	15	18	6	2,302	129	3	3.36	.891	—	—	—	—	—	—	—	—
2019–20	Montreal Canadiens	NHL	6	1	1	3	340	24	0	4.24	.875	—	—	—	—	—	—	—	—
2019–20	Laval Rocket	AHL	13	3	7	3	750	43	0	3.44	.876	—	—	—	—	—	—	—	—
2019–20	Charlotte Checkers	AHL	4	2	1	1	241	9	0	2.24	.924	—	—	—	—	—	—	—	—
2020–21	Hartford Wolf Pack	AHL	2	2	0	0	120	2	1	1.00	.962	—	—	—	—	—	—	—	—
2020–21	New York Rangers	NHL	9	3	2	1	486	21	1	2.59	.898	—	—	—	—	—	—	—	—
2021–22	Hartford Wolf Pack	AHL	37	20	14	2	2,164	106	1	2.94	.904	—	—	—	—	—	—	—	—
2021–22	New York Rangers	NHL	1	1	0	0	60	2	0	2.00	.935	—	—	—	—	—	—	—	—
2022–23	Providence Bruins	AHL	20	8	7	4	1,123	58	0	3.10	.909	—	—	—	—	—	—	—	—
2022–23	Boston Bruins	NHL	1	1	0	0	60	1	0	1.00	.968	—	—	—	—	—	—	—	—
2022–23	Colorado Avalanche	NHL	1	0	0	0	28	1	0	2.15	.889	—	—	—	—	—	—	—	—
2022–23	Colorado Eagles	AHL	7	4	3	0	398	16	1	2.41	.918	—	—	—	—	—	—	—	—
2023–24	Chicago Wolves	AHL	24	8	14	2	1,356	80	0	3.54	.880	—	—	—	—	—	—	—	—
2024–25	Savannah Ghost Pirates	ECHL	32	10	18	3	1,817	96	1	3.17	.893	—	—	—	—	—	—	—	—
NHL totals			169	70	58	21	9,241	448	8	2.91	.905	2	0	2	202	9	0	5.87	.804

Medal record

Representing United States

Ice hockey

World Championships
Bronze medal – third place	2018 Denmark	

=== International ===
Year	Team	Event	GP	W	L	T	MIN	GA	SO	GAA	SV%
2016	United States	WC	6	1	4	0	350	19	0	3.25	.871
2018	United States	WC	9	7	2	0	526	15	2	2.29	.912
Senior totals			15	8	6	0	876	34	2	2.77	.892

== Awards and honors ==
Award	Year
NAHL
Robertson Cup champion	2008–09
Playoff MVP	2008–09
Regular season MVP	2008–09
Top Goaltender	2008–09
First Team All-Star	2008–09
College
All-ECAC Hockey Rookie Team	2009–10
All-ECAC Hockey Third Team	2009–10
All-ECAC Hockey First Team	2010–11
AHCA East First-Team All-American	2010–11
Ken Dryden Award	2010–11

Awards and achievements
Preceded by Ben Scrivens	Ken Dryden Award; 2010–11	Succeeded by Troy Grosenick
