= Harbour Grace CeeBee Stars =

Harbour Grace Ocean Enterprises CeeBee Stars
- City: Harbour Grace, Newfoundland and Labrador
- Founded: 2004
- Operated: 2004-2014
- Home arena: Danny Cleary Community Centre
- Colours: Blue, Red, White

Franchise history
- 1958-59: Conception Bay All-Stars
- 1959-69: Conception Bay CeeBees
- 2003-2015: Conception Bay North CeeBee Stars
- 2015–Present: Harbour Grace CeeBee Stars

The Harbour Grace Ocean Enterprises CeeBee Stars (also commonly known as the HGOE CeeBee Stars due to a sponsorship deal that began October 23, 2015) are a senior ice hockey team based in Harbour Grace, Newfoundland and Labrador and part of the Avalon East Senior Hockey League. The CeeBees are eight-time winners of the Herder Memorial Trophy as provincial champions.

== History ==
The club has its roots in the former Conception Bay Ceebees, a very successful hockey club in the Newfoundland Senior Hockey League from 1958 to 1969. The CeeBee Stars were founded in 2003 and joined the Avalon East Senior Hockey League. The Stars won six straight AESHL championships from 2006 to 2011 and are four-time winners of the Herder Memorial Trophy, emblematic of Newfoundland senior hockey supremacy.

From 2011 to 2014, the CeeBee Stars were part of the re-formed Newfoundland Senior Hockey League. In 2013, the CeeBee Stars defeated the defending Herder Trophy champion and 2011 Allan Cup champion Clarenville Caribous in four-straight-games. The victory earned the CeeBee Stars a berth in the 2014 Allan Cup in Dundas, Ontario.

The CeeBee Stars rejoined the Avalon East Senior Hockey League for the 2015–16 season. In September 2015, AESHL was granted senior A status by Hockey Newfoundland and Labrador. The AESHL champions will play the CWSHL champions for the Herder Memorial Trophy beginning in March 2016.

== Seasons and records ==
=== Season-by-season results ===
Led league in points†	Herder Trophy champions‡

Note: GP = Games played, W = Wins, L = Losses, T = Ties, OTL = Overtime Losses, Pts = Points, GF = Goals for, GA = Goals against, DNQ = Did not qualify

AESHL = Avalon East Senior Hockey League, NSHL = Newfoundland Senior Hockey League

Conception Bay North CeeBee Stars regular season and postseason statistics and results, 2003–present
Season	League	Regular season									Postseason					
Season	League	GP	W	L	T	OTL	GF	GA	PTS	Finish	GP	W	L	GF	GA	Result
2003–04	AESHL															
2004-05	AESHL															Lost in Herder Finals to Deer Lake Red Wings, 3-4
2005–06	AESHL															Won Herder Memorial Trophy vs. Deer Lake Red Wings, 4-2‡
2006–07	AESHL															Won Herder Memorial Trophy vs. Deer Lake Red Wings, 4-2‡
2007–08	AESHL															Won Herder Memorial Trophy vs. Deer Lake Red Wings, 4-2‡
2008–09	AESHL															Lost in Herder Finals to Clarenville Caribous, 1-4
2009–10	AESHL															Lost in Herder Finals to Clarenville Caribous, 1-4
2010–11	AESHL															Lost in Herder finals to Grand Falls-Windsor Cataracts, 0-4
2011–12	NSHL															
2012–13	NSHL															
2013–14	NSHL															
2014–15	Did not enter															
2015–16	AESHL															
2016–17	AESHL															Won Herder Memorial Trophy vs. Clarenville Caribous, 3-2‡
2018-19	AESHL	15	2	13		0	41	92	4							
2019-20	AESHL	1	0	1		0	3	8	0							

== Leaders ==
=== Captains ===
- Chris Bartlett (2006–08)
- Keith Delaney (2008–09, 2012–13)
- Matthew Thomey (2009–12, 2019)
- Mike Dyke (2012–13)
- Robert Slaney
- Sam Roberts (2016–17)

=== Coaches ===
- Edmund (Eddie) Oates (2004–09)
- Ian Moores (2010–11, 2013, 2019)
- Steve Power (2011)
- Corey Crocker (2011–13)

== Championships and awards ==
- Eight all-Newfoundland senior hockey championships (Herder Memorial Trophy): 1960, 1961, 1965, 1967, 2006, 2007, 2008, 2013, 2017

== Honoured Members ==
Adam Jones
