= Memorial Stadium (St. John's) =

Former arena in Newfoundland, now a supermarket

Coordinates: 47°34′32.97″N 52°42′07.83″W

- Interactive map of Memorial Stadium
- Address: 20 Lake Avenue; St. John's, Newfoundland; Canada
- Owner: City of St. John's; Choice Properties REIT
- Capacity: Hockey: 3,765

Construction
- Groundbreaking: 1952
- Opened: December 28, 1954; 71 years ago (as a sports venue); September 21, 2007; 18 years ago (as a Dominion store)
- Closed: April 4, 2001; 25 years ago (as a sports venue); May 8, 2026; 4 months ago (as a Dominion store)
- Demolished: 2006 (interior only)
- Cost: $7,000,000

Tenants
- St. John's Maple Leafs (AHL) (1991–2000); Dominion (Loblaw) (2007–2026)

Website
- Dominion

Memorial Stadium was a 3,765-seat multi-purpose arena in St. John's, Newfoundland and Labrador, Canada. St. John's previous indoor arena, Prince's Rink, burned down in November 1941, but the demands of the Second World War prevented the city from replacing it until well after the war ended. In 1948, a Citizens' Committee was established to raise funds to build a new arena to be named in honour of Newfoundlanders who died in that war. Fundraising went slowly until in 1954, St. John's City Council floated a bond to finance the facility, which then became property of the city. It officially opened in December 1954.

It is the former home of the St. John's Maple Leafs of the American Hockey League (1991–2001). The arena played host to many events, such as an exhibition game featuring the local senior hockey team, the St. John's Caps and the Soviet Red Army. It also played host to two NBA exhibition games and musical acts, as well as Pope John Paul II. Wooden bleachers were used throughout the building's earlier life, and plastic seats were installed later, towards the beginning of the arena’s AHL tenure. Memorial Stadium closed in April 2001, replaced by Mary Brown’s Centre.

== Dominion Memorial Market ==
The interior structure of the building was later torn down, and in July 2006, after much controversy, construction started on a new Dominion supermarket. Coincidentally, the parent company of Dominion in Newfoundland, Loblaw Companies, converted part of Maple Leaf Gardens in Toronto, the former stadium of the Maple Leafs' parent club, to a Loblaws supermarket; both projects were approved despite grassroots protests.

On September 21, 2007 Mayor Andy Wells cut the ribbon opening Dominion Memorial Market. The converted stadium features underground parking, escalators, and shopping cart conveyors. The store also retains the scoreboard from the stadium's days as a hockey arena.

In January 2026, Loblaw Companies announced they would be closing the Dominion store in May.

Dominion closed its doors on May 8, 2026.

== See also ==
- Architecture of St. John's
