= Prince of Wales Rink =

Canadian ice arena (1898 - 1941)

- Location: 10 Fort William Place, St. John's, Newfoundland, Canada
- Capacity: 200

Construction
- Groundbreaking: December 11, 1898
- Opened: January 28, 1899
- Closed: November 28, 1941
- Demolished: November 28, 1941
- Architects: Fred Angel and W.H. Murray

The Prince of Wales' Skating Rink, later known as The Prince's Rink and then The Arena, was a domed wooden structure ice arena located on Factory Lane in St. John's, Newfoundland and Labrador, Canada, that operated for over 42 years. It was named in honour of Edward VII, the Prince of Wales and the eldest son of Queen Victoria. The historic Prince's Rink was a major center for skating, hockey, boxing, wrestling and other sports. The Arena hosted the first thirty-eight St. John's senior hockey league championships (Boyle Trophy) and the first seven all-Newfoundland hockey championships (Herder Memorial Trophy) before the building was destroyed by fire on November 28, 1941.

== History ==
On December 11, 1898, the foundation for the rink was laid near the old Newfoundland Railway terminus at Fort William on the west side of Factory Lane between Plymouth Road and Forest Road (sandwich between curling rink and Queen's College) on land previously owned by the Reid Newfoundland Railway. The cornerstone was laid on December 15. Robert G. Reid Sr. deeded the land in exchange for shares of equal value in the new rink management company. The Rink followed the size and design of the Montagnard Rink built in 1898 at Montreal. Two Reid Railway engineers, Fred Angel and W.H. Murray, drew up the plans for the new rink. The wooden structure was built by Campbell and Company and Horwood Lumber Company and was completed in less than two months. Planks recovered from a ship wreck were steamed, curved and bolted to form the dome roof.

The rink opened for skating on January 28, 1899, with 200 in attendance. The first hockey match played on the new rink's ice surface was a game arranged by the newly founded city hockey league between Canadians and native Newfoundlanders (City team) at 7:30 pm on February 1, 1899, before a large number of spectators. The first goal scored in Newfoundland's first indoor hockey rink was credited to the City team after the Canadians accidentally scored on their own net. The stronger Canadian team would score twice on the Newfoundlanders and won the game 2-1. James Patrick Fox was the referee for this first hockey game.

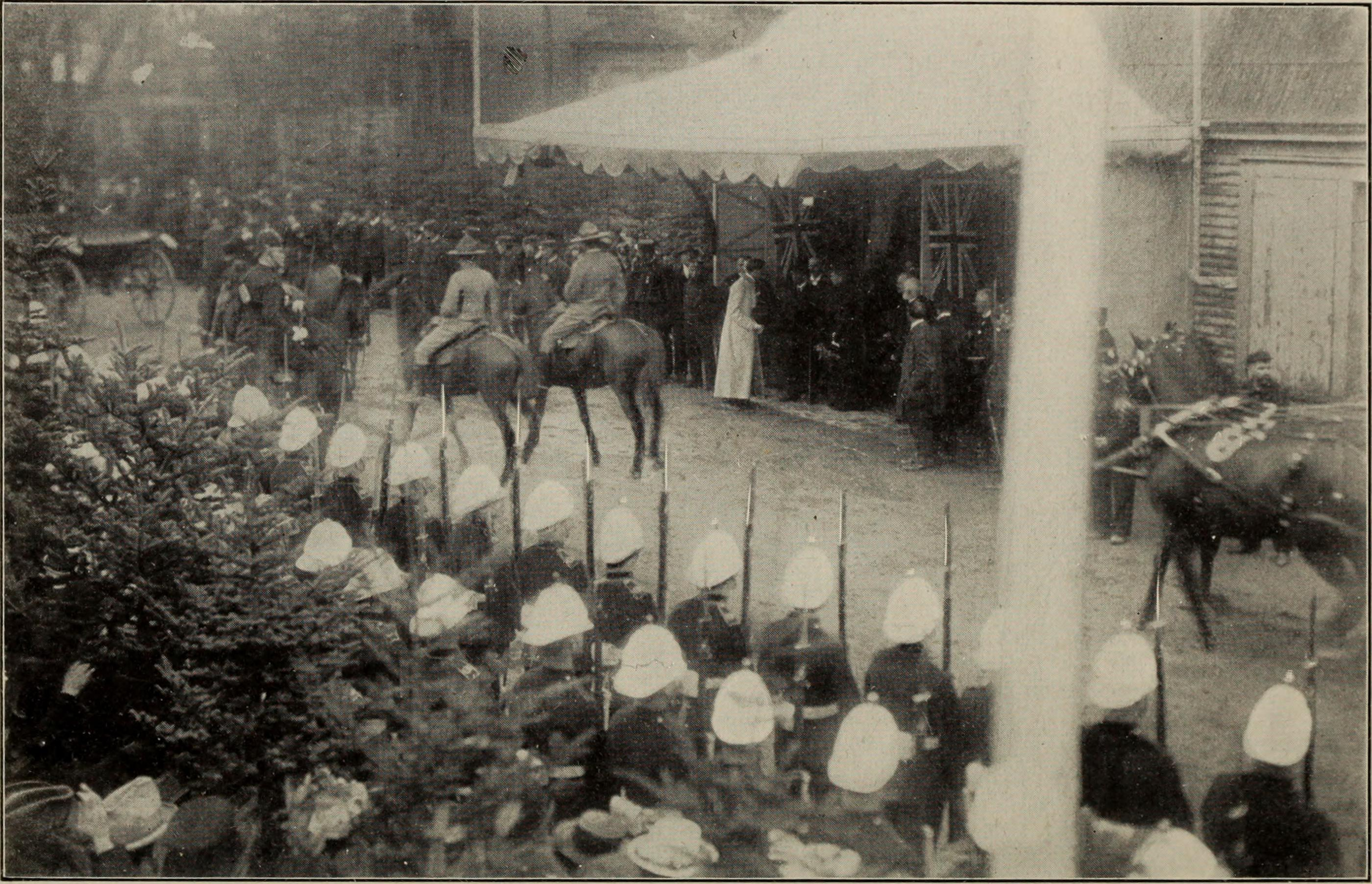
Prince George (the future King George V) and Princess Mary (later Queen Mary) depart the Prince's Rink, 26 October 1901

Prince George (the future King George V and Princess Mary (later Queen Mary) visited the arena on October 26, 1901, to hear 6,000 schoolchildren sing an anthem composed specifically for the royal tour of Newfoundland and, echoing the visit of George's father, King Edward VII, in 1860, receive the gift of a nine-month old Newfoundland dog, to pass on to their then-seven year old son, Prince Edward (later King Edward VIII).

The Arena Rink Company installed an ice-making plant shortly after taking ownership, to lengthen the hockey and skating season. In August, 1937, Newfoundland's first artificial ice surface was tested.

On November 28, 1941, the Arena was catering to a private skating party that included military personnel. At 7:20 pm fire broke out in the boiler room and very quickly the wooden structure was completely engulfed in flames. A spectacular blaze lit the city on a night with a mandatory wartime blackout. The primary ice arena in St. John's and the adjacent curling rink burned to the ground.

The site of the former rink is now an office tower at 10 Fort William Place.

== Ownership and management ==
In the summer of 1933 the owners stated that the 30-year-old rink would not open the following winter and subsequently put the rink up for sale. The Guards Athletic Association of St. John's purchased the rink and hired Arthur Johnson as manager.

In 1937, a new company, the Arena Rink Company Limited, was formed and took ownership of the rink and retained Johnson as manager. The major shareholders were two St. John's Businessmen, Chesley Crosbie and Chesley A. Pippy, who changed the name of the rink to The Arena.

Over the 42 years of operation, there were five rink managers: James P. Fox (1899), Frank Donnelly, Charles Bulley, P.E. "Neddy" Outerbridge, and Arthur Johnson (1933-1941)

== See also ==
- Royal eponyms in Canada
