= Avalon East Senior Hockey League =

Canadian ice hockey league

- Regions: Avalon Peninsula, Eastern Newfoundland
- Founded: 1967
- No. of teams: 6
- Associated titles: Herder Memorial Trophy (NL Sr. Championship); Allan Cup (National Championship)
- Recent champions: Clarenville Caribous
- Website: AESHL.com

The Avalon East Senior Hockey League (AESHL) is a senior ice hockey league with teams based in Newfoundland, Canada. It is one of two senior hockey leagues in Newfoundland, the other being the West Coast Senior Hockey League.

== History ==
The Avalon East Senior Hockey League is based in Newfoundland and Labrador. The League was created in 2003, ended in 2017, and was replaced with the East Coast Senior Hockey League.

== Teams ==
Team	City	Home arena
Conception Bay Blues	Conception Bay South, Newfoundland and Labrador	Conception Bay South Arena
HGOE CeeBee Stars	Harbour Grace, Newfoundland and Labrador	Danny Cleary Community Centre
Wexford Estates Outer Cove Marines	Torbay, Newfoundland and Labrador	Jack Byrne Arena
St. John's Capitals	St. John's, Newfoundland and Labrador	Mary Brown's Centre
Southern Shore Breakers	Witless Bay, Newfoundland and Labrador	Southern Shore Arena
Clarenville Caribous	Clarenville, Newfoundland and Labrador	Eastlink Clarenville Events Centre

== Former teams ==
- Mount Pearl Blades
- Flatrock Flyers

== Regular season champions ==
Season	Team	Points	W-L-OTL record
2022-2023	Clarenville Ford Caribous	33	15–2–3
2021-2022	Pugliesvich Southern Shore Breakers	30	14–4–2
2020-2021	RoofTech Sr. Caps	30	15–1–0
2019-2020	Clarenville Ford Caribous	2	1–0–0
2018-2019	Pugliesvich Southern Shore Breakers	29	14–0–1
2016-2017	RoofTech Sr. Caps	30	15–3–0
2015–16	HGOE CeeBee Stars	37	18–2–1
2014–15	The Bigs Northeast Eagles	40	20–3–0
2013–14	Northeast Eagles	36	18-2-0-0
2012–13			
2011–12	The Bigs Northeast Eagles	28	14–4–0
2010–11	RoofTech Sr. Caps	24	11–6–2

== Playoff champions ==
- 2006 - Conception Bay North CeeBee Stars
- 2007 - Conception Bay North CeeBee Stars
- 2008 - Conception Bay North CeeBee Stars
- 2009 - Conception Bay North CeeBee Stars
- 2010 - Conception Bay North CeeBee Stars
- 2011 - Conception Bay North CeeBee Stars
- 2012 - St. John's Capitals
- 2013 - St. John's Capitals
- 2014 - St. John's Capitals
- 2015 - Southern Shore Breakers
- 2016 - St. John's Toyota Plaza Caps
- 2017 - CeeBee Stars
- 2022 - Southern Shore
- 2023 - Southern Shore
- 2024 - St Johns Caps
- 2025 - Clarenville Caribous

== Herder champions ==
- 2006 - Conception Bay North Cee Bee Stars
- 2007 - Conception Bay North Cee Bee Stars
- 2008 - Conception Bay North Cee Bee Stars
- 2017 - Conception Bay North Cee Bee Stars
