= Herder Memorial Trophy =

Ice hockey trophy

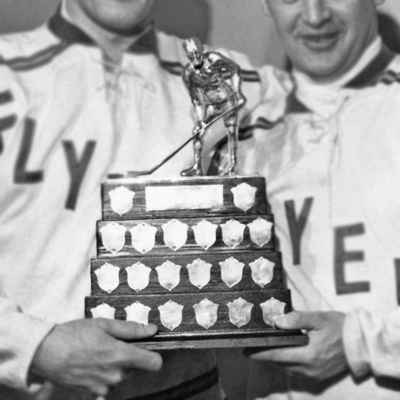
- Sport: Ice hockey
- Awarded for: Senior ice hockey champions of Newfoundland and Labrador

History
- First award: 1935
- First winner: Corner Brook (10 wins)
- Most wins: St. John's (20 wins)
- Most recent: Deer Lake Red Wings (4 wins)

The Herder Memorial Trophy, colloquially known as the Herder, is the championship trophy awarded annually to the senior ice hockey champions of Newfoundland and Labrador, Canada. The original cast silver trophy was donated in 1935 by The Evening Telegram newspaper, on behalf of the Herder family, as a memorial to five brothers who played hockey in St. John's.

First presented in 1935, the Herder Memorial Trophy has been awarded 87 times. The Herder was not awarded in 1942, 1943, 1991, 2020 and 2021. The first winner of the Herder trophy was a team from Corner Brook that won the inaugural all-Newfoundland ice hockey championship on March 22, 1935. The record of most Herder wins belongs to the teams from St. John's that won the trophy a total of 20 times. The 2026 Herder was awarded on April 5, 2026 to the Deer Lake Red Wings.

== History ==
=== Origins ===
The idea of a new competition to decide the ice hockey champions of Newfoundland gained momentum in early 1935 as organized hockey spread across the island and hockey teams started to travel and compete in regional championships. During a meeting of the St. John's Hockey League on March 5, 1935, it was announced that a trophy, for a championship competition, was to be donated by The Evening Telegram newspaper to be perpetually awarded to Newfoundland's best hockey team. The Herder would become emblematic of ice hockey supremacy in Newfoundland and Labrador. The Evening Telegram was published by a member of the Herder family since the founding of the paper in 1879 up until the retirement of Stephen Herder in 1993. The Telegram has played an integral role in the promotion and sponsorship of the Herder Championships.

=== First all-Newfoundland championship ===
The inaugural all-Newfoundland championship took place in St. John's at the Prince of Wales Rink on March 21 and 22, 1935 between Corner Brook, the western hockey champions, and the Guards from the St. John's Senior League that won the Avalon hockey championship. This was the beginning of a new chapter in the history of Newfoundland hockey.

The St. John's Guards earned the right to represent the Avalon Peninsula by first defeating St. Bon's in a 2-game series to become St. John's city champions, and then by toppling the Bay Roberts Rovers in a 2-game, total goal series. The All-Newfoundland championship match-up was then set; the Guards of St. John's would play host to the Corner Brook All-Star Team. Fans in St. John's eagerly awaited the arrival of the Corner Brook team. Tickets to the 2 games were sold out quickly. Corner Brook edged the Guards 1–0 in Game 1, and was victorious in Game 2 by a 4–2 margin to become the island's top team, and first Herder Memorial Trophy Champions.

=== Donation of the trophy ===
The Herder trophy was the brainchild of Ralph Herder, then president of The Evening Telegram, as a memorial to his five late brothers. Ralph's brothers Arthur, William, Douglas, Augustus and Hubert were all avid hockey players in the St. John's Hockey league.

Originally donated in memory of five Herder brothers, the trophy now honors the memory of seven brothers, including Ralph and his youngest brother James. In 2009, the name of Ralph's son Stephen was added to the trophy. All seven Herder brothers were fine hockey players and often played together, with four of them sometimes playing together on a championship team. James Herder coached the 1935 Guards team that lost the inaugural Herder championship to Corner Brook in March 1935.

== The Herder family ==
The Herders were a very prominent family in St. John's, Newfoundland and Labrador. William James Herder, born in Old Perlican, was the founder of Newfoundland's first daily newspaper, The Evening Telegram. Ralph, one of William's seven sons, became publisher of the Telegram in 1934 after the death of Augustus (Gus), who was the fifth brother to pass away. Ralph donated the Trophy on behalf of the Herder Family as a memorial to his five late brothers (Douglas, Arthur, Hubert, Herbert Augustus (Gus) and William Jr.). Later the names of Ralph, his youngest brother James, and Ralph's son Stephen were added to the trophy.

The trophy is now a memorial to the following Herder family members:

1. Arthur John Herder practiced law in Moose Jaw, Saskatchewan and served in the 32nd Overseas Battalion of the Canadian Expeditionary Force beginning in December 1914. Arthur joined the Newfoundland Regiment in February 1916. As a second Lieutenant, he was wounded at Beaumont Hamel on July 1, 1916. The following year Arthur was fatally wounded in France and died on December 1, 1917 at the age of 32.
2. Hubert Clinton Herder was born July 28, 1891. Hubert was a lieutenant with the First Newfoundland Regiment when he was killed at Beaumont Hamel, France on July 1, 1916, at the age of 25.
3. William H. Herder was the second oldest son of the Herder family. Will was president of the Evening Telegram from 1922 up to his death on August 22, 1934 at the age of 50.
4. Douglas C. Herder was the third oldest Herder brother and former hockey player in the St. John's league where he played for the Saints. Doug was an Accountant at the Royal Stores before moving to Montreal in 1907. He returned to St. John's in June 1909 in poor health, suffering from typhoid fever. He died on July 8, 1909 at the age of 23.
5. Herbert Augustus (Gus) Herder was Vice-President and Circulation Manager of the Evening Telegram. He died on December 28, 1934, of pneumonia at the age of 47.
6. Ralph Barnes Herder was born in St. John's on August 10, 1894. He volunteered to join the First Newfoundland Regiment in September 1914. Ralph was seriously wounded at Beaumont Hamel on July 1, 1916, and was wounded at Monchy, France in 1917. In 1918 he was promoted to lieutenant. He married Mary Rendell in June 1924 and they had two sons, Rendell [Rex] and Stephen. Ralph became President of the Evening Telegram following the deaths of his brothers William and Gus in 1934. He was the driving force behind the creation of the Herder Memorial Trophy in memory of his five brothers who predeceased him. Ralph died on January 8, 1955 at the age of 61.
7. James Milley Herder was born July 22, 1904, the youngest of seven brothers. Jim was vice president and general manager of The Evening Telegram when his brother Ralph died in 1955. He took over as publisher and piloted The Evening Telegram Ltd through a period of tremendous growth and prosperity during the late 1950s and through the 1960s. Jim died on August 25, 1970, in St. John's at the age of 66.
8. Stephen Rendell Herder, Ralph's son, was a longtime publisher of The Evening Telegram. An environmentalist long before his time, Steve was known for saving the Rennies River. A bridge over Rennies River is dedicated to his efforts. He was a proud promoter of the Herder Memorial Trophy. Stephen died in 1993 at the age of 65.

== The trophy ==
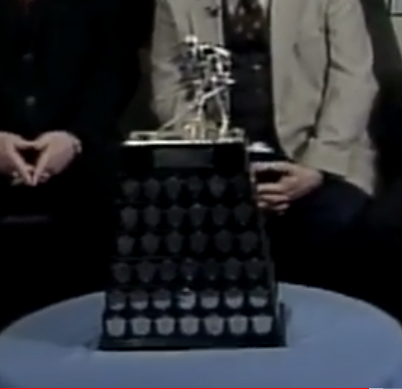
The original Herder Trophy with six additional tiers in 2007, the year it was retired

An announcement was made on March 5, 1935 at a meeting of the St. John's Hockey League that the Evening Telegram, on behalf of the Herder family, will donate a trophy to be awarded to the winners of an all-Newfoundland hockey championship. The trophy would not be available for the 1935 championship but arrived in St. John's from the manufacturer six months later, and was sent to Corner Brook in October of that year to meet the fifth condition placed on the trophy. The trophy was formally presented to the winning team at the Corner Brook Sports Club's annual meeting in November 1935.

The Herder consisted of a cast-silver hockey player mounted on an ebony base. St. Bon's star Edward "Key" Kennedy (1911-1955) was the model for the hockey player that stands atop the original trophy. Trophy-donor Ralph Herder brought a photo of Kennedy in a hockey pose to New York where the model was made and a figure was cast in silver.

Beginning in 1947, metal shields inscribed with the name of each winning team were fixed to the base. In 1952 a second wooden tier was added and, in 1960, third and fourth tiers were added. Two more tiers were subsequently added before the original trophy was retired in 2007.

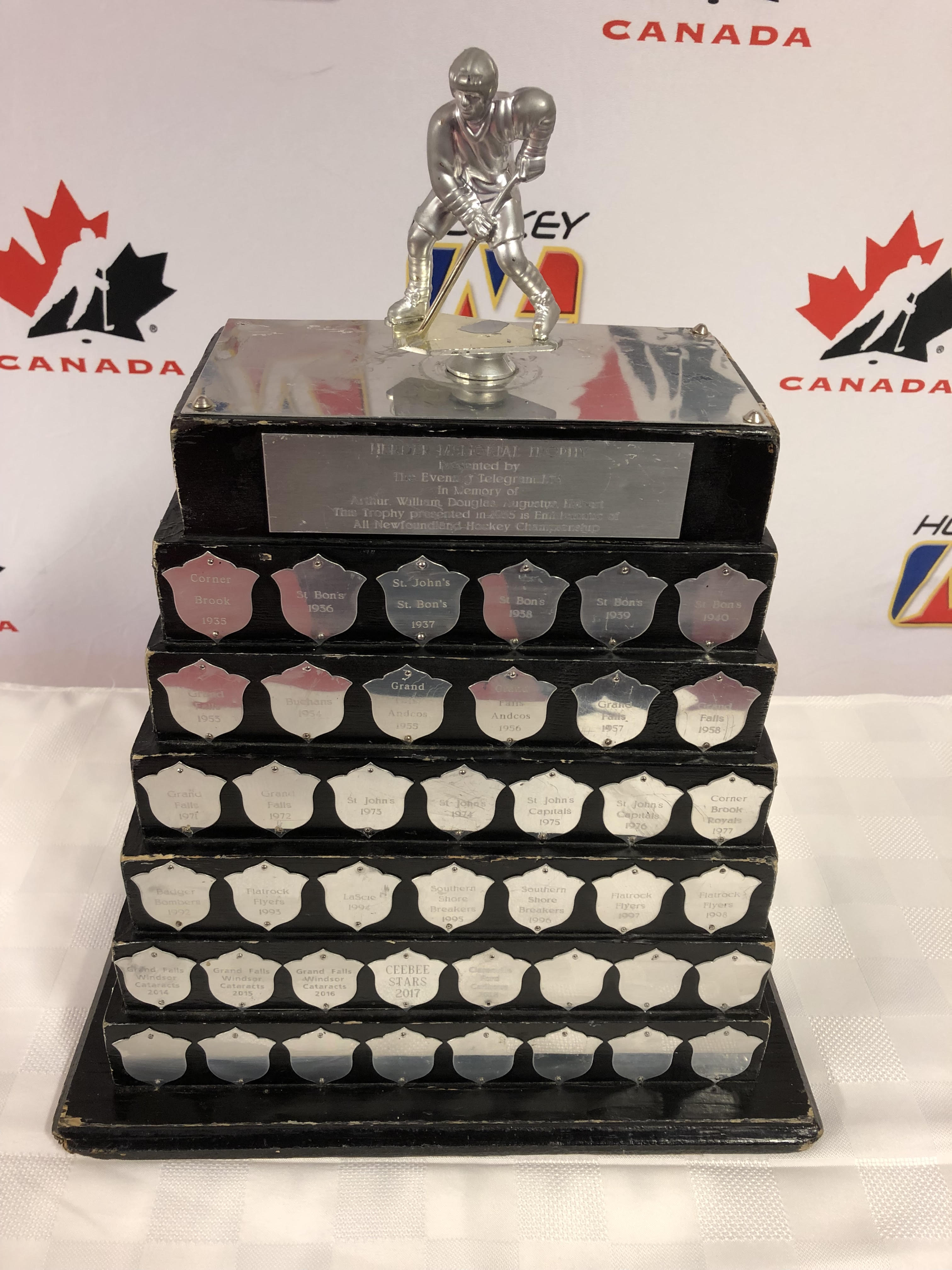
The Herder in 2019

The original Herder was retired in 2007 and is now on display in the Newfoundland & Labrador Hockey Hall of Fame which is located at the Corner Brook Civic Centre. Since 2007 a replica has been awarded to the championship teams.

== Conditions placed by the trophy donor ==
in 1935, the Herder family attached eight conditions to the donation of the Herder Memorial Trophy to govern competition for the all-Newfoundland amateur hockey championship:

1. Trophy to be known as "The Herder Memorial Trophy" presented by The Evening Telegram in memory of Arthur, Douglas, William, Augustus and Hubert Herder.
2. Trophy to be emblematic of the All-Newfoundland Amateur Hockey championship, and must be competed for each year in St. John's.
3. All matches held for the Trophy to be held under the rules of the body governing hockey in Newfoundland.
4. The Trophy cannot be won outright but is to be competed for each year.
5. The winner shall hold the Trophy until the start of the hockey season the following year and then it must be returned to the donors.
6. Arrangements for the playing of the All-Newfoundland championship are to be made by the main body governing hockey, the management of the rink, and the donors.
7. No names of teams or players winning the trophy to be engraved on the trophy or base.
8. If an All-Newfoundland championship is impossible in any year, the Trophy shall be held by the team winning the championship of the Avalon Peninsula or other Inter-Sectional championship.

=== Exceptions to the original conditions ===
==== Condition #2 ====
From 1935 though 1941 the All-Newfoundland finals were played at the former Prince's Rink in St. John's (renamed The Arena in 1937). Subsequent to the destruction of the Arena by fire on November 28, 1941, the Herder championships were cancelled in 1942 and 1943 due to depleted rosters of senior hockey teams with men serving overseas during the Second World War. After the Arena burned down in November 1941, St. John's did not have a suitable venue until the opening of Memorial Stadium in December 1954. In 1944, the Herder finals were held outside St. John's for the first time when Bell Island and Corner Brook played the all-Newfoundland final series at the Corner Brook rink. The NAHA was granted permission by Ralph Herder to hold the Herder finals outside the capital city for the first time. Since 1944 condition #2 has not been enforced and the Herder Finals location has been decided by NAHA and typically held in the arenas of the competing teams.

In recent years, the Herder finals series was held at Mile One Centre (and before it was built, at Memorial Stadium) in St. John's and frequently sold out the 6,000 seat building. Games were also held in the Pepsi Centre in the city of Corner Brook, on the west coast of the island, when teams from that area were playing for the cup.

Since 2013 the Herder finalists have the right to decide the location of their home games.

==== Condition #4 ====
In 1957 the first exception to condition #4 occurred when NAHA made the controversial decision to award the Herder Memorial Trophy to the Grand Falls Andcos by default. The basis for the ruling was that Grand Falls was the only senior "A" team registered for the 1957 Herder playoffs and NAHA ruled that this met condition #8.

==== Condition #7 ====
Engraved plates with the names of the winning teams have been affixed to the base of the Herder Trophy since the late 1940s. Beginning in 1952, additional layers have been added to the trophy base as required to accommodate successive Herder Champion nameplates.

== Series format ==
Over the history of the championship series, NAHA has dictated a number of series formats that included the winners of divisional, local league or island-wide league playoffs. The original series featured the eastern champions versus western champions. This format continued until 1962 when an island-wide Newfoundland Senior Hockey league was formed. The champions of the provincial league were awarded the Herder trophy until 1989 when the league was disbanded. Eastern league champions played for the Herder in 1990 and in 1991 there was no Herder Championship.

Between 1991 and 2011, the format of the Herder finals reverted to a competition between the champions of local leagues. The eastern league champions played a western or central league champion in a finals series to decide the top provincial team who were awarded the Herder Trophy.

On February 25, 2015, Hockey Newfoundland and Labrador approved a request by the Central West Senior Hockey League in which they asked to play for the historic Herder Trophy because it was the only operating Senior A hockey league registered in the province.

Hockey Newfoundland and Labrador announced on March 10, 2022, that they will be awarding the Herder Memorial Trophy to the winner of the Avalon East Senior Hockey League finals.

For 2023, Hockey NL announced that the champion of the Avalon East Senior Hockey League will face-off against the champion of the West Coast Senior Hockey League in a seven-game series for the Herder Memorial Championship.

Beginning in 2024, Hockey NL announced that the Avalon East Senior Hockey League champions would meet the Central West Senior Hockey League champions in a seven-game Herder Championship series

=== Series format history ===
This is a list of Herder championship series formats since 1935.

Note: GP = Games played, W = Wins, L = Losses, T = Ties, OTL = Overtime Losses, Pts = Points, GF = Goals for, GA = Goals against

Years	Format	Participants
1935	Two-team Herder final, two-game total-goals series	Eastern champions (winner of an Avalon championship) vs. Western champions (winner of a Corner Brook-Grand Falls intertown series)
1936 to 1939	Three-team single-round robin Herder final series, top two teams in a championship game	Eastern (City League) champions, Conception Bay League Champion, Western champions
1940	Two-team Herder final, two-game total-goals series	Western Champions vs. All-Avalon Champions
1941	Two-team Herder final, best-of-three series	Eastern (City League champions) vs. Conception Bay champions (Buchans were Western Champion but chose not to enter)
1942, 1943	The Herder championships were due player shortages during the Second World War	n/a
1944	Two-team Herder final, best-of-three series	Eastern (Avalon champions) vs. Western champions
1945	Two-team Herder final, best-of-three series	Eastern (City League champions) vs. Conception Bay champions (a Western champion did not enter)
1946	Two-team Herder final, best-of-three series	Eastern (Avalon champions) vs. Western champions
1947	Two-team Herder final, two-game total-goals series	Eastern (Avalon champions) vs. Western champions
1948 to 1954	Two-team Herder final, best-of-three series	(Note: only Buchans and Grand Falls entered teams for Herder competition in 1953, 1954 and 1955)
1955 to 1956	Three-team Herder playoff series, best-of-five final series	St. Bon's Bluegolds (City League champions) vs. Buchans in best-of-three semi-final, winner vs. Grand Falls in a best-of-five final series
1957	No competition for the Herder	NAHA awarded the trophy to the only team entered (Grand Falls)
1958	Two-team Herder final, best-of-seven series	Only Corner Brook and Grand Falls entered teams for Herder competition in 1958
1959	Two-team Herder final, best-of-seven series	Eastern champions (Avalon champions) vs. Western champions
1960 to 1962	Two-team Herder final, best-of-seven series	East Division champions vs. West Division champions
1963 to 1970	Best-of-seven finals series	One provincial senior league with a regular season, top four teams in semi-finals, followed by the Herder finals
1971 to 1973	Best-of-seven finals series	One provincial senior league with a regular season, a home-and-home round robin semi-final series, top two teams played in a best-of-seven Herder final series
1974	Best-of-seven finals series	One provincial senior league with a regular season, top four teams in semi-finals, followed by the Herder finals
1975	Best-of-seven finals series	Three-team provincial senior league with a 16-game regular season, 2nd & 3rd place teams in semi-final, winner played #1 in Herder final
1976	Best-of-seven finals series	Four-team provincial senior league with a 20-game regular season (12 games for St. John's), 3rd & 4th place teams in best-of-five Quarter-final, winner played 2nd place in semi-final, winner played 1st place in Herder final
1977 to 1978	Best-of-seven finals series	Eight-team provincial senior league with East and West Divisions, Winner of Eastern playoffs faced winner of Western playoffs in Herder final
1979 to 1989	Best-of-seven finals series	One provincial senior league with a regular season, top four teams in semi-finals, followed by the Herder finals
1990	Two-team Herder final, best-of-seven finals series	Eastern champions (winner of St. John's Capitals vs. Avalon East league all-stars winner played the Central league champions in the semi-final). The winner played a final series vs. the Western Champion (winner of Corner Brook vs. Stephenville)
1991	No Herder competition	n/a
1992	Two-team Herder final, best-of-five series	Avalon East League champions vs. Central League champions
1993	Two-team Herder final best-of-five series	Eastern champions (winner of Avalon East vs. Conception Bay South Intermediate League Herder semi-final) vs. Central League champions
1994	Two-team Herder final best-of-five series	Eastern champions (winner of Avalon East vs. Avalon West Herder semi-final) vs. Central League champions
1995 to 1996	Two-team Herder final, best-of-seven series	Avalon East League champions vs. Avalon West League champions
1997	Two-team Herder final, best-of-five series	Eastern champion (winner of Avalon East vs. Avalon West best-of-seven Herder semi-final) vs. Central League champions
1998	Two-team Herder final, best-of-seven series	Round robin semi-final between champions of Avalon East, Avalon West and the Central League. Top two teams got berth to final.
1999	Two-team Herder final, best-of-five series	Round robin semi-final between champions of Avalon East, Avalon West and the Central League. Top two teams got berth to final.
2000 to 2011		
2012 to 2014	Two-team Herder final, best-of-seven series	NLSHL championship final
2015	Two-team Herder final, best-of-seven series	Hockey NL approved a request by the Central West Senior A Hockey League to play for the Herder. The 2015 Herder Memorial championship was determined in the Central West Senior Hockey A League. final
2016 to 2017	Two-team Herder final, best-of-five series	CWSHL champions vs. AESHL champions
2018	Two-team Herder final, best-of-seven series	CWSHL champions vs. ECSHL champions
2019	Two-team Herder final, best-of-seven series	NSHL Central Division champions vs. Eastern Division champions
2020	No Herder competition	n/a
2021	No Herder competition	n/a
2022	The Herder was awarded to the Avalon East Senior Hockey League Champions	n/a
2023	Two-team Herder final, best-of-seven series	Avalon East Senior Hockey League champions vs. West Coast Senior Hockey League champions
2024-present	Two-team Herder final, best-of-seven series	Avalon East Senior Hockey League champions vs. Central West Senior Hockey League champions

== Herder championship finals results ==
Note: After 1947 all series results are listed as games won. Most championship series before 1948 were decided on total Goals. (TG = total goals in the series)

Year	Winning team	Coach	Losing team	Coach (runners up)	Series Result	Herder-winning goal
2026	Deer Lake Red Wings	Darren Langdon	Conception Bay Blues	Morgan Warren	4-1	Cody Drover (5:44, third)
2025	Deer Lake Red Wings	Darren Langdon	Clarenville Caribous	Ryan Delaney	4-0	Drew Langdon (11:57, first)
2024	St. John's Senior Caps	Scott Bray	Deer Lake Red Wings	Darren Langdon	4-0	Kyle McGrath PPG (13:44, first)
2023	Southern Shore Breakers	Josh Lunden	Deer Lake Red Wings	Darren Langdon	4–1	Jesse Sutton PPG (6:13, second)
2022	Southern Shore Breakers	Josh Lunden	Clarenville Caribous	Rick Sheppard	4–0	Andrew Brennan PPG (0:38, first)
2021	No Herder Championship	n/a	n/a	n/a	n/a	n/a
2020	No Herder Championship	n/a	n/a	n/a	n/a	n/a
2019	Grand Falls-Windsor Cataracts	Patrick Yetman (playing-coach)	Southern Shore Breakers	Josh Lunden	4–1	Alex Dalley (8:43, OT)
2018	Clarenville Caribous	Rebecca Russell	St. John's Senior Caps		4–0	Keith Delaney (05:21, first)
2017	Conception Bay North CeeBee Stars	Ian Moores	Clarenville Caribous	Rebecca Russell	4–1	Kenny King (15:59, third)
2016	Grand Falls-Windsor Cataracts	Tom Coolen	St. John's Capitals	Wally Bray	3–0	Rodi Short (13:23, first)
2015	Grand Falls-Windsor Cataracts	Shane Lukinchuk	Corner Brook Royals	Darren Langdon	4–0	Cam Fergus (14:29, OT)
2014	Grand Falls-Windsor Cataracts	Shane Lukinchuk	Clarenville Caribous	Ivan Hapgood	4–2	Rob Hennigar PPG (2:14, OT)
2013	Conception Bay North CeeBee Stars	Ian Moores	Clarenville Caribous		4–0	( , )
2012	Clarenville Caribous	Ivan Hapgood	Grand Falls-Windsor Cataracts	Brian Casey	4–1	( , )
2011	Grand Falls-Windsor Cataracts	Brian Casey	Conception Bay North CeeBee Stars	Ian Moores	4–0	( , )
2010	Clarenville Caribous		Conception Bay North CeeBee Stars	Ian Moores	4–1	( , )
2009	Clarenville Caribous		Conception Bay North CeeBee Stars	Ian Moores	4–1	(, )
2008	Conception Bay North CeeBee Stars	Ed Oates	Deer Lake Red Wings	Andy Brake	4–2	Keith Delaney (3:31, second)
2007	Conception Bay North CeeBee Stars	Ed Oates	Deer Lake Red Wings	Andy Brake	4–2	Keith Delaney (4:11, third)
2006	Conception Bay North CeeBee Stars	Ed Oates	Deer Lake Red Wings	Andy Brake	4–2	( , )
2005	Deer Lake Red Wings	Andy Brake	Conception Bay North CeeBee Stars		4–3	(Brian Barker, 3rd Period)
2004	Southern Shore Breakers	Greg Smyth	Corner Brook Royals		3–1	( , OT)
2003	Flatrock Flyers		Corner Brook Royals		3–0	( , )
2002	Corner Brook Royals		Flatrock Flyers		3–2	( , )
2001	Deer Lake Red Wings	Andy Brake	Flatrock Flyers		3–2	Rob Robinson ( , OT)
2000	Southern Shore Breakers		Torbay West Side Charlies		4–0	( , )
1999	Southern Shore Breakers	Don Roche	Badger Bombers		2–1	( , )
1998	Flatrock Flyers	Kevin Fagan	Southern Shore Breakers		4–3	Kirby Dumaresque ( , OT)
1997	Flatrock Flyers	Kevin Fagan	Badger Bombers		3–0	( , )
1996	Southern Shore Breakers	Adrian Sullivan	Flatrock Flyers		4–3	( , )
1995	Southern Shore Breakers	Adrian Sullivan	Flatrock Flyers		4–0	( , )
1994	La Scie Jets	Gus Greco	Southern Shore Breakers		3–2	Craig Young ( , 2nd OT)
1993	Flatrock Flyers	Joe Maynard	Gander Flyers	Chris Conrad (playing-coach)	3–2	Derrick Pelley ( 3 goals in game 7)
1992	Badger Bombers	Steve Croucher	Flatrock Flyers		3–1	Russ Kennedy ( , OT)
1991	n/a	n/a	n/a	n/a	No Herder Championship	n/a
1990	St. John's Capitals	Russ Adam (playing-coach)	Corner Brook Royals	Terry Gillam	4–0	( , )
1989	Port aux Basques Mariners	Ron Coleman	St. John's Capitals		4–2	Bill MacDougall ( , )
1988	Corner Brook Royals	Gus Greco (playing-coach)	St. John's Capitals		4–1	Dan Cormier ( , OT)
1987	St. John's Capitals	Bill Riley (playing-coach)	Stephenville Jets		4–2	( , )
1986	Corner Brook Royals	Mike Anderson	Stephenville Jets		4–2	Eddie Kearsey ( , second)
1985	Corner Brook Royals	Mike Anderson	Stephenville Jets		4–2	Kirk Johnson ( 6:16, second)
1984	Stephenville Jets	Larry Smith	Corner Brook Royals	Steve Robson (playing-coach)	4–1	Zane Forbes ( 2:21, second)
1983	Stephenville Jets	Larry Smith	Grand Falls Cataracts	Cecil Thomas	4–3	Darren Pickrem (17:54, second)
1982	Grand Falls Cataracts	Joe Byrne	Gander Flyers	Rick MacCallum (playing-coach)	4–2	Gary Feener ( , )
1981	Grand Falls Cataracts	Joe Byrne	Corner Brook Royals	Forbes Kennedy	4–2	Tom Coolen (2:18, first)
1980	Gander Flyers	Jack Faulkner	St. John's Blue Caps		4–1	Kirk Johnson ( , second)
1979	St. John's Mike's Shamrocks	Jim Byrne	Gander Flyers	Jack Faulkner	4–3	Ron Cadigan (4:40, 2nd OT)
1978	St. John's Blue Caps	Bill Clarke	Gander Flyers	Ron Sheppard	4–3	Charlie Babstock ( , third)
1977	Corner Brook Royals	Frank "Danky" Dorrington	St. John's Capitals		4–2	Bill Perry ( , second)
1976	St. John's Capitals	George Faulkner	Grand Falls Cataracts	Leo Murphy (playing-coach)	4–1	( , )
1975	St. John's Capitals	Bob Badcock	Corner Brook Royals	Doug Sheppard (playing-coach)	4–0	Randy Pearcey (6:39, second)
1974	St. John's Capitals	Bob Badcock	Grand Falls Cataracts	Leo Murphy	4–1	Randy Pearcey (10:32, first)
1973	St. John's Capitals	Bob Badcock	Grand Falls Cataracts	Marc Pichette	4–0	Derek Hancock (2:00, third)
1972	Grand Falls Cataracts	Marc Pichette	St. John's Capitals	Howie Meeker	4–0	Frank Finlayson (1:36, second)
1971	Grand Falls Cataracts	Marc Pichette	St. John's Capitals	Howie Meeker	4–3	Frank Finlayson (4:10, first)
1970	St. John's Capitals	Howie Meeker	Gander Flyers	Jacques Allard (playing-coach)	4–3	Ford Metcalfe (2:10, second)
1969	Gander Flyers	Jacques Allard (playing-coach)	Buchans Miners	Hugh Wadden (playing-coach)	4–0	Mike Kelly (2:10, second)
1968	Corner Brook Royals	Frank "Danky " Dorrington (playing-coach)	Buchans Miners	Hugh Wadden (playing-coach)	4–1	Frank "Danky " Dorrington (5:43, OT)
1967	Conception Bay CeeBees	George Faulkner (playing-coach)	Gander Flyers	Jacques Allard (playing-coach)	4–1	Gerry Lahey (16:16, second)
1966	Corner Brook Royals	Frank "Danky " Dorrington (playing-coach)	Conception Bay CeeBees	George Faulkner (playing-coach)	4–1	Frank "Danky" Dorrington (8:58, second)
1965	Conception Bay CeeBees	George Faulkner (playing-coach)	Corner Book Royals	Frank "Danky " Dorrington (playing-coach)	4–1	Jack Faulkner (14:08, second)
1964	Corner Brook Royals	Frank "Danky" Dorrington (playing-coach)	Buchans Miners	Neil Amadio (playing-coach)	4–2	Mickey Walsh (4:05, First)
1963	Buchans Miners	Neil Amadio (playing-coach)	Corner Book Royals	Frank "Danky " Dorrington (playing-coach)	4–2	Frank Finlayson ( , second)
1962	Corner Brook Royals	Frank "Danky " Dorrington (playing-coach)	Conception Bay CeeBees	George Faulkner (playing-coach)	4–1	Willis French ( 1:37, second)
1961	Conception Bay CeeBees	George Faulkner (playing-coach)	Gander Flyers	Wes Trainor	4–0	George Faulkner (18:36, second)
1960	Conception Bay CeeBees	George Faulkner (playing-coach)	Grand Falls Andcos	Jean Pichette (playing-coach)	4–2	Alex Faulkner (18:31, first)
1959	Grand Falls Andcos	Ray Lacroix (playing-coach)	Conception Bay CeeBees	George Faulkner (playing-coach)	4–1	Jim "Bucky" Hannaford ( 11:51, second)
1958	Grand Falls Andcos	Wes Trainor	Corner Brook Royals	Joe Iannarelli (playing-coach)	4–1	Roger Dean (14:56 , second)
1957	Grand Falls Andcos	Wes Trainor	n/a	n/a	n/a	n/a
1956	Grand Falls Andcos	Wes Trainor	Buchans Miners	Jimmy Hornell (playing-coach)	3–0	Marky Andrews(11:07, first)
1955	Grand Falls All-Stars	Wes Trainor (playing-coach)	Buchans Miners	Frank Bowman (playing coach)	3–1	Jim "Bucky" Hannford(7:17, second)
1954	Buchans Miners	Frank Bowman (playing coach)	Grand Falls All-Stars	Joe Byrne	2–1	Gerry Casey (18:13, third)
1953	Grand Falls All-Stars	Wes Trainor (playing-coach)	Buchans Miners	Frank Grabowski	2–0	Joe Byrne (14:20, first)
1952	Buchans Miners	Frank Bowman (playing-coach)	St. Bon's		2–0	Willie Robertson (2:26, third)
1951	Buchans Miners	Frank Bowman (playing-coach)	St. Bon's	Jack Vinicombe	2–0	(Carver or Joy, first)
1950	Buchans Miners	Frank Bowman (playing-coach)	St. Bon's	Jack Vinicombe	2–0	Ken Joy (9:30, second)
1949	St. Bon's	Frank "Dee" Donnelly	Corner Brook	Frank Bowman, Scotty McPhail	2–0	Noel Vinnicombe (15:20, second )
1948	St. Bon's	Frank "Dee" Donnelly	Buchans		2–0	Cyril Power (19:58, third)
1947	St. Bon's	Frank "Dee" Donnelly	Grand Falls	C.I. Power	12–8 (TG)	(, )
1946	St. Bon's	Bill Harris (playing-coach)	Grand Falls		35–3 (TG)	Noel Vinnicombe (1:44, second)
1945	St. Bon's	Bill Harris (playing-coach)	Bell Island		2–0	Bill Power (6:19, second)
1944	Bell Island	Reid Proudfoot	Corner Brook		2–0	(, )
1943	No Herder Championship					
1942	No Herder Championship					
1941	Bell Island	Reid Proudfoot	Royals (St. John's)	Harold Gross	2–1	Gordon Normore (19.02, Third)
1940	St. Bon's	Frank "Dee" Donnelly	Buchans		17–7 (TG)	(, )
1939	St. Bon's	Frank "Dee" Donnelly	Bell Island		2–0 (TG)	Jack Vinnicombe (, third)
1938	St. Bon's	Frank "Dee" Donnelly	Grand Falls		9–1 (TG)	(, )
1937	St. Bon's	Frank "Dee" Donnelly	Buchans	"Min" Moore (Manager)	4–1 (TG)	Jack Vinnicombe (13:10, First)
1936	St. Bon's	Frank "Dee" Donnelly	Corner Brook		14–3 (TG)	Charlie Godden (10:00, third)
1935	Corner Brook	Ron Taffe (general manager)	St. John's Guards		5–2 (TG)	Tony Ledrew (7:05, third)

== Herder presentation ceremony and final game results ==
At the conclusion of the final game, in an on-ice ceremony, the Herder Memorial Trophy is presented to the captain of the winning team. Traditionally the presenter has been a representative of the trophy donor, from the Herder family or The Evening Telegram, and/or a representative from Hockey Newfoundland and Labrador. (TG = Total-goals series)

Year	Winning team	Final game score	Location	Final game date	Herder presentation
1935	Corner Brook	4–2	The Prince's Rink, St. John's	22 March 1935	Note: The Herder Trophy was not yet manufactured at the time of the first all-Newfoundland championship. The trophy arrived in Corner Brook in October and was presented to the winning team at the Annual Meeting of the Corner Brook Sports Club on November 14, 1935.
1936	St. Bon's	5–2	The Prince's Rink, St. John's	14 March 1936	Ralph Herder presented the Herder Memorial Trophy to Art Hamlyn, Captain of St. Bon's team. This was the first presentation of the Trophy to a championship team at the conclusion of the final game.
1937	St. Bon's	4–1	The Arena (formerly the Prince's Rink, St. John's)	3 March 1937	James Herder presented the Herder Trophy to Art Hamlyn, Captain of St. Bon's, at a dinner following the final game.
1938	St. Bon's	9–1	The Arena (St. John's)	16 March 1938	James Herder presented the trophy to the St. Bon's team
1939	St. Bon's	2–0	The Arena (St. John's)	16 March 1939	Hubert Herder presented the Herder trophy to the St. Bon 's team
1940	St. Bon's	5–6 (17–7 TG series)	The Arena (St. John's)	27 March 1940	Ralph Herder presented the trophy to St. Bon's team
1941	Bell Island Islanders	6–5	The Arena (St. John's)	31 March 1941	Ralph Herder, President of the Evening Telegram, presented the Herder Trophy to Bell Island captain Gordon Edwards
1942	-	-	-	-	Herder championship was not played
1943	-	-	-	-	Herder championship was not played
1944	Bell Island Islanders	5–1	Corner Brook Rink	22 March 1944	
1945	St. Bon's	9–1	St. Bon's Forum (St. John's)	9 March 1945	Robert.S.Furlong, President of NAHA, to Cyril Power, St. Bon's Captain
1946	St. Bon's	11–4	St. Bon's Forum	12 March 1946	
1947	St. Bon's	4–4 (12–8 TG series)	Gander Gardens (hangar 12 at the airport)	8 March 1947	
1948	St. Bon's	2–1	Grand Falls Stadium	10 March 1948	After the second (and final) game, Ralph Herder, Manager of The Evening Telegram, presented the Herder Trophy to St. Bon's Captain Cyril Power
1949	St. Bon's	8–3	Corner Brook Rink	10 March 1949	James M. Herder to Cyril Power, St. Bon's Captain
1950	Buchans Miners	8–2	Grand Falls Stadium	14 March 1950	Ralph Herder to Arthur "Copper" Leyte, Buchans Miners
1951	Buchans Miners	6–2	Grand Falls Stadium	16 March 1951	Magistrate B.J.Abbott to George Pike, Buchans Miners
1952	Buchans Miners	5–2	Grand Falls Stadium	19 March 1952	Ralph Herder to Bill Scott, Buchans' Captain
1953	Grand Falls All-Stars	4–1	Grand Falls Stadium	13 March 1953	Ralph Herder to Dave Green, Grand Falls Captain
1954	Buchans Miners	4–3	Grand Falls Stadium	13 March 1954	James Herder to Bill Scott, Buchans Captain
1955	Grand Falls All-Stars	8–1	Grand Falls Stadium	15 March 1955	James Herder and Ralph Coyler (President NAHA) to Neil Amadio, Grand Falls Captain
1956	Grand Falls Andcos	10–0	Grand Falls Stadium	15 March 1956	James Herder presented the Herder to Jack MacKenzie, Grand Falls Captain
1957	Grand Falls Andcos	-	-	-	(NAHA declared Grand Falls the champions by default)
1958	Grand Falls Andcos	9–3	Humber Gardens, Corner Brook	12 April 1958	Stephen Herder (Ralph's son) presented the Herder to Orin Carver, Grand Falls Captain
1959	Grand Falls Andcos	8–3	Grand Falls Stadium	27 April 1959	Hubert Herder (father was Gus) presented the Herder to Grand Falls Captain Jim "Bucky" Hannaford
1960	Conception Bay Cee Bees	16–3	Harbour Grace Stadium	16 April 1960	Dan Herder, assisted by his father Stephen, to CeeBees' Captain Jim Penney,
1961	Conception Bay Cee Bees	10-4	Gander Gardens (On Foss Avenue)	4 April 1961	Jimmmy Herder Jr., nephew of the six memorialized Herder brothers, to CeeBees' Captain Jim Penney
1962	Corner Brook Royals	6–1	Harbour Grace Stadium	31 March 1962	Danny Herder, 11-year-old son of Stephen R. Herder, presented the Herder to Royals' Captain Orin Carver at Harbour Grace Stadium.
1963	Buchans Miners	6–4	Buchans Stadium	13 April 1963	Bill Callahan presented the Herder to captain Hugh Wadden of the Miners
1964	Corner Brook Royals	6-2	Humber Gardens, Corner Brook	20 March 1964	Wallace McKay (General Manager of The Western Star) presented the Herder to Clobie Collins, Royals' Captain
1965	Conception Bay Cee Bees	12–5	Harbour Grace Stadium	25 March 1965	Stephen Herder presented the Herder to injured captain Jim Penney of the CeeBees
1966	Corner Brook Royals	7–2	Humber Gardens	April 7, 1966	Wallace McKay, general manager of The Western Star, presented the Herder to Royals' Captain Clobie Collins, on behalf of the Herder family.
1967	Conception Bay Cee Bees	5–4	Gander Gardens (Lindbergh Road/Airport Blvd)	March 23, 1967	Stephen Herder presented the Herder to Jim Penney, CeeBees captain
1968	Corner Brook Royals	6–4 (10min OT)	Buchans Stadium	24 March 1968	Jim Herder presented the Herder to Jim Guy, Royals captain
1969	Gander Flyers	5–0	Buchans Stadium	22 March 1969	Jim Herder presented the Herder to Flyers' captain Harry Katrynuk at Buchans Arena.
1970	St. John's Capitals	7–3	Memorial Stadium, St. John's	April 3, 1970	Dan Herder presented the Herder to Capitals' captain George Spracklin at Memorial Stadium in St. John's.
1971	Grand Falls Cataracts	3–0	Memorial Stadium, St. John's	10 April 1971	Jim Herder presented the Herder to Captain Leo Murphy and Alternate Captains Al Dwyer and Jim Temple.
1972	Grand Falls Cataracts	5–2	Memorial Stadium, St. John's	15 April 1972	Bob Badcock, Sports Editor of the Evening Telegram, presented the Herder to Cataracts Captain Jim Beckman
1973	St. John's Capitals	3–1	Grand Falls Stadium	14 April 1973	Dan Herder presented the Herder to Capitals captain Bern Fitzpatrick
1974	St. John's Capitals	6–1	Grand Falls Stadium	11 April 1974	John Taite of the Evening Telegram presented the Herder to Capitals' captain Ford Metcalfe.
1975	St. John's Capitals	6–2	Humber Gardens (Corner Brook)	15 March 1975	
1976	St. John's Capitals	6–2	Memorial Stadium, St. John's	28 March 1976	
1977	Corner Brook Royals	7–1	Humber Gardens, Corner Brook	1 April 1977	
1978	St. John's Blue Caps	4–3	Memorial Stadium, St. John's	8 April 1978	
1979	St. John's Mike's Shamrocks	6–5 (2nd OT)	Gander Gardens	8 April 1979	Stephen Herder presented the herder to Nigel Facey, Shamrocks' Captain
1980	Gander Flyers	5–1	Memorial Stadium, St. John's	5 April 1980	Stephen Herder presented the Herder to Bruce Sparkes, Flyers Captain
1981	Grand Falls Cataract	11–0	Grand Falls Stadium	11 April 1981	Steve Herder presented the Herder to Roger Elliott, Cataracts' Captain
1982	Grand Falls Cataracts	3–2	Gander Gardens	29 March 1982	Dan Herder presented the Herder to Gene Faulkner, Cataracts captain
1983	Stephenville Jets	4–2	Stephenville Gardens	3 April 1983	Fred Jackson (sports editor, Evening Telegram) presented the Herder to Cal Dunville, Jets' captain
1984	Stephenville Jets	6–1	Stephenville Gardens	6 April 1984	Stephen Herder presented the Herder to Cal Dunville, Jets' captain
1985	Corner Brook Royals	7–2	Humber Gardens, Corner Brook	30 March 1985	Steve Herder presented the Herder to Terry Gillam, Royals Captain
1986	Corner Brook Royals	7–4	Humber Gardens, Corner Brook	23 March 1986	Freddy Jackson, representing the Herder family, presented the Herder to Craig Kennedy, Royals' Captain
1987	St. John's Capitals	12–6	Memorial Stadium, St. John's	24 March 1987	
1988	Corner Brook Royals	4–3 (OT)	Humber Gardens, Corner Brook	10 April 1988	
1989	Port aux Basques Mariners	2–1	Bruce Arena, Port aux Basques	3 April 1989	
1990	St. John's Capitals	10–3			
1991	Herder championship was not played	n/a	n/a	n/a	n/a
1992	Badger Bombers	5–4 (OT)	Badger Stadium		Melvin Andrews, NAHA Senior Division Chairman presented the Herder to Hubie Hollett, Bombers Captain
1993	Flatrock Flyers	7–4	Brother O'Hehir Arena		
1994	La Scie Jets	7–6 (2nd OT)	Cape St. John Arena, La Scie		
1995	Southern Shore Breakers	7–2			
1996	Southern Shore Breakers	9–2	Fieldian Gardens, St. John's		
1997	Flatrock Flyers	5–1	Badger Stadium		
1998	Flatrock Flyers	4–3 (OT)	Southern Shore Arena (Mobile, NL)		
1999	Southern Shore Breakers	6–3	Southern Shore Arena (Mobile, NL)		
2000	Southern Shore Breakers	5-4			
2001	Deer Lake Red Wings	5–4 (OT)			
2002	Corner Brook Royals	5-4			
2003	Flatrock Flyers	6-5			
2004	Southern Shore Breakers	5-4 (OT)			
2005	Deer Lake Red Wings	3–2			
2006	Conception Bay North CeeBee Stars	3–1			
2007	Conception Bay North CeeBee Stars	5–2	Pepsi Centre (Corner Brook)	21 April 2007	presented the Herder to Chris Bartlett, Ceebees Captain
2008	Conception Bay North CeeBee Stars	4-1	Mile One Centre, (St. John's)	12 April 2008	presented the Herder to Chris Bartlett, CeeBees Captain
2009	Clarenville Caribous	5–2	Mile One Centre, (St. John's)	4 April 2009	
2010	Clarenville Caribous	7-4	Mile One Centre, (St. John's)		
2011	Grand Falls-Windsor Cataracts	4–0	Joe Byrne Memorial Stadium (Grand Falls-Windsor)		Gerry Evans, Hockey NL presented the Herder to Brad Lewis, Cataracts captain
2012	Clarenville Caribous	6-3	Pepsi Centre (Corner Brook)		
2013	Conception Bay North CeeBee Stars	4–2	S.W. Moores Memorial Stadium (Harbour Grace)	16 March 2013	
2014	Grand Falls-Windsor Cataracts	3–2 (OT)	Joe Byrne Memorial Stadium (Grand Falls-Windsor)	5 April 2014	Kitty Dean (The Evening Telegram) and Murray Roberts (Vice -President Hockey NL) presented the Herder to Mike Brent, Cataracts captain
2015	Grand Falls-Windsor Cataracts	3–2 (OT)	Joe Byrne Memorial Stadium (Grand Falls-Windsor)	8 March 2015	Kitty Dean (The Evening Telegram) and Murray Roberts (Vice -President Hockey NL) presented the Herder to Mike Brent, Cataracts captain
2016	Grand Falls-Windsor Cataracts	10-1	Jack Byrne Memorial Arena (Torbay)	25 March 2016	
2017	Harbour Grace CeeBee Stars	4–3	Eastlink Events Centre Clarenville	4 April 2017	
2018	Clarenville Caribous	6-1	Jack Byrne Memorial Arena (Torbay)	14 April 2018	Nick Herder & Dan Herder to Dustin Russell, Caribous Captain
2019	Grand Falls-Windsor Cataracts	3–2 (OT)	Joe Byrne Memorial Stadium (Grand Falls-Windsor)	14 April 2019	Gary Gale (Hockey NL) to Michael Brent, Cataracts Captain
2020	Herder championship was not played	n/a	n/a	n/a	n/a
2021	Herder championship was not played	n/a	n/a	n/a	n/a
2022	Southern Shore Breakers	3–0	Eastlink Events Centre Clarenville	23 April 2022	Gary Gale, Hockey NL Chair of Senior Hockey, presented the Herder to Breakers captain Jeremy Nicholas
2023	Southern Shore Breakers	6–2	Ken Williams Southern Shore Arena (Mobile, NL)	23 April 2023	Gary Gale, Hockey NL Chair of Senior Hockey, presented the Herder to Breakers captain Jeremy Nicholas
2024	St. John's RoofTech Senior Caps	5-0	Hodder Memorial Recreation Complex, Deer Lake	6 April 2024	Gary Gale, Hockey NL Chair of Senior Hockey, presented the Herder to Caps' captain Mike Druken
2025	Deer Lake Red WIngs	4-1	Clarenville Events Centre	5 April 2025	Gary Gale, Hockey NL Chair of Senior Hockey, presented the Herder to Wings' captain Stephen Simms
2026	Deer Lake Red WIngs	4-1	Hodder Memorial Recreation Complex	5 April 2026	Gary Gale, Hockey NL Chair of Senior Hockey, presented the Herder to Wings' captain Stephen Simms

== Herder finals appearances ==
Note: In the "Years of appearance" column, bold years indicates winning the Herder Finals.

Appearances	Team	Wins	Losses	Win %	Years of appearance
33	St. John's (Guards, St. Bon's, Royals, Capitals, Blue Caps, Mike's Shamrocks, Caps)	20	13	.606	1935, 1936, 1937, 1938, 1939, 1940, 1941, 1945, 1946, 1947, 1948, 1949, 1950, 1951, 1952, 1970, 1971, 1972, 1973, 1974, 1975, 1976, 1977, 1978, 1979, 1980, 1987, 1988, 1989, 1990, 2016, 2018, 2024
25^{[A]}	Grand Falls-Windsor (GF All-Stars, GF Andcos, GF/GFW Cataracts)	15	10	.600	1938, 1946, 1947, 1953, 1954, 1955, 1956, 1957^{[A]}, 1958, 1959, 1960, 1971, 1972, 1973, 1974, 1976, 1981, 1982, 1983, 2011, 2012, 2014, 2015, 2016, 2019
23	Corner Brook (All-Stars, Royals)	10	13	.435	1935, 1936, 1944, 1949, 1958, 1962, 1963, 1964, 1965, 1966, 1968, 1975, 1977, 1981, 1984, 1985, 1986, 1988, 1990, 2002, 2003, 2004, 2015
16	Conception Bay CeeBees, CBN/HG CeeBee Stars	9	7	.563	1959, 1960, 1961,1962, 1965, 1966,1967, 2005, 2006, 2007, 2008, 2009, 2010, 2011, 2013, 2017
14	Buchans (All-Stars, Miners)	5	9	.357	1937, 1940, 1948, 1950, 1951, 1952, 1953, 1954, 1955, 1956, 1963, 1964, 1968, 1969
10	Southern Shore Breakers	7	3	.700	1994, 1995, 1996, 1998, 1999, 2000, 2004, 2019, 2022, 2023
9	Flat Rock Flyers	4	5	.444	1992, 1993, 1995, 1996, 1997, 1998, 2001, 2002, 2003
9	Gander Flyers	2	7	.222	1961, 1967, 1969, 1970, 1978, 1979, 1980, 1982, 1993
9	Clarenville Caribous	4	5	.444	2009, 2010, 2012, 2013, 2014, 2017, 2018, 2022, 2025
9	Deer Lake Red Wings	4	5	.375	2001, 2005, 2006, 2007, 2008, 2023, 2024, 2025, 2026
5	Stephenville Jets	2	3	.400	1983, 1984, 1985, 1986, 1987
4	Bell Island	2	2	.500	1939, 1941, 1944, 1945
3	Badger Bombers	1	2	.333	1992, 1997, 1999
1	La Scie Jets	1	0	1.000	1994
1	Port Aux Basques Mariners	1	0	1.000	1989
1	Torbay West Side Charlies	0	1	.000	2000
1	Conception Bay Blues	0	0	.000	2026

Notes

A. In 1957 the Herder Finals series was not played. Two teams entered the Section 'A' playoffs in 1957 but after Bell Island withdrew before the finals started, NAHA decided to award the Herder Trophy to the Grand Falls Andcos by default.

== Cliff Gorman Memorial Award winners ==
In 2005 Hockey Newfoundland and Labrador established the Cliff Gorman Memorial Award to be presented annually to the most valuable player (MVP) for his team during the Herder finals series. A native of Prince Edward Island, Cliff was instrumental in promoting hockey in Corner Brook and in Newfoundland and Labrador since moving there in 1955. Cliff Gorman was inducted into the Newfoundland & Labrador Hockey Hall of Fame in 1996 in the builder category.

Year	Winner	Team	Position
2026	Brandon Hynes	Deer Lake Red Wings	RW
2025	Bryan Gillis	Deer Lake Red Wings	G
2024	Joel Bishop	St. John's Senior Caps	F
2023	Stephen Oates	Southern Shore Breakers	D
2022	Keenan Kennedy	Southern Shore Breakers	F
2021	(no Herder finals)		
2020	(no Herder finals)		
2019	Michael Brent	Grand Falls-Windsor Cataracts	D
2018	Justin Pender	Clarenville Caribous	D
2017	A.J. Whiffen	Harbour Grace Ocean Enterprise Cee Bee Stars	G
2016	Luke Gallant	Grand Falls-Windsor Cataracts	D
2015	Cam Fergus	Grand Falls-Windsor Cataracts	F
2014	A.J. Whiffen	Grand Falls-Windsor Cataracts	G
2013	Ryan Delaney	Eastlink Cee Bee Stars	F
2012	Dustin Russell	Clarenville Caribous	F
2011	Mike Sibley	Grand Falls-Windsor Cataracts	F
2010	Jason Churchill	Clarenville Caribous	G
2009	Jason Churchill	Clarenville Caribous	G
2008	Keith Delaney	Conception Bay North CeeBee Stars	F
2007	Sean Wadden	Conception Bay North CeeBee Stars	F
2006	Derrick Kent	Conception Bay North CeeBee Stars	F
2005	Graham Cook	Deer Lake Red Wings	G

== Broadcasting ==
The first island-wide live broadcast of a Herder championship game was on the VONF (Voice of Newfoundland) radio station on Saturday night March 23, 1935. NL Hockey Hall of Famer John (Jack) Tobin provided the play-by-play of the final game of the first all-Newfoundland hockey championships between Corner Brook and the Guards live from the Prince's Rink in St. John's.

In 1947, from Gander Gardens (in Hangar 12 at the airport), all Newfoundland radio stations participated in an island-wide broadcast of the Herder finals between St. Bon's and Grand Falls sponsored by Coca-Cola. Don Jamieson provided the play-by-play commentary. The broadcast was carried by the stations VONF, VONH (VONF remote relay), VOCM (St. John's), VOWN (Corner Brook) and VORG (Gander).

Don Jamieson hosted the island-wide broadcast of the 1949 All-Newfoundland Finals from the Corner Brook Rink. This was made possible courtesy of the Department of Posts and Telegraphs.

The 1950 all-Newfoundland finals was broadcast live from Grand Falls stadium over station CBN. The play-by-play commentary for the two finals games between Buchans and St. Bon's was provided by Don Jamieson. The broadcast was sponsored by Jockey Club Brewing Ltd.

In March 1953 the Herder finals was broadcast on an island-wide hook-up, on CBC stations and CJON, with Don Jamieson and Frank "Toe" Byrne providing the commentary live from Grand Falls Stadium.

22-year-old Bob Cole broadcast the 1956 Herder finals on VOCM live from Grand Falls Stadium. Jack Forsey of Corner Brook provided the play-by-play for CBC.

In 2007 and 2008, Rogers Cable broadcast the Herder finals province-wide using the Newfoundland and Labrador House of Assembly Channel.

Games three through five of the 2009 finals were streamed online at thesportspage.ca.

In 2016 all Herder finals games were webcast by Hockey NL's partner Bell Aliant TV One.

Grand Falls-Windsor Broadcaster George Scott provided the play-by-play on a live webcast of the Herder Finals from 2011 to 2019.

Since 2022, all Herder finals games were live streamed for a fee on AO Live, an Atlantic Canadian-based company recognized as a leader in live webcasting and video productions. The play-by-play commentary for the 2025 Herder finals was provided by George Scott and the live video courtesy of Mike Goulding.

=== List of Herder Finals Broadcasters ===
Year	Network(s)	Play-by-play	Color commentator(s)	Host(s)	Notes
1935, 1936	VONF	John (Jack) Tobin			Live from the Prince's Rink in St. John's
1947	VORG, VONF, VONH, VOCM, VOWN	Don Jamieson			Island-wide radio broadcast, sponsored by Coca-Cola, live from Gander Gardens on every broadcasting channel in Newfoundland, made possible by the coordination of postal telegraph facilities and the Newfoundland Broadcasting Corporation
1948	VONF	Don Jamieson			Live from Grand Falls Stadium
1949	VONF	Don Jamieson			Island-wide broadcast live from Corner Brook Rink made possible courtesy of the Department of Posts and Telegraphs.
1950, 1951, 1953	CBN	Don Jamieson			Live from Grand Falls Stadium
1952	VOCM	Don Jamieson			Live from Grand Falls Stadium
1954	CBN/CBT/CBG/CBY, CJON	Don Jamieson			Live from Grand Falls Stadium
1956	VOCM, CBN (CBC)	Bob Cole (VOCM), Jack Forsey (CBC)			
1992	Cable 9	Ted Patey	Jack Stuckless		
2007	Rogers Television, Persona Communications	Dale Fry	Terry Hart	Paddy Daly, Darren Colbourne, Steve Callahan	Live from Mile One in St. John's and the Pepsi Centre in Corner Brook
2008	Rogers Television, Eastlink	Paddy Daly	Steve Power, Steve Callahan		Live from Mile One in St. John's and the Pepsi Centre in Corner Brook
2009	sportspage.ca				Live webcast hosted by The Sports Page
2011		George Scott	Barry Manual		Live webcast of final game from Joe Byrne Memorial Stadium
2014	Bell Aliant	George Scott	Robert Goulding		Live webcast sponsored by the Telegram
2019	AO Live	George Scott	Robert Goulding		Live stream of final game from Joe Byrne Memorial Stadium
2022	AO Live				
2023 to 2025	AO Live	George Scott			
2026	AO Live	George Scott	Mike Goulding	Live stream from Conception Bay South Arena (Games 1 & 2) and Hodder Memorial Recreation Complex (Games 3,4 & 5)	
