= Clarenville Caribous =

Canadian ice hockey team

- City: Clarenville, Newfoundland and Labrador
- League: Avalon East Senior Hockey League
- Operated: 2006
- Home arena: Eastlink Clarenville Events Centre
- Colours: Black, Red, and White
- General manager: Derek MacPhee
- Head coach: Ivan Hapgood
- Captain: Dustin Russell

The Clarenville Caribous (also commonly known as the Clarenville Ford Caribous due to an ongoing sponsorship deal announced September 23, 2015) are a senior ice hockey team based in Clarenville, Newfoundland and Labrador, and a member of the Avalon East Senior Hockey League. The Caribous are three-time winners of the Herder Memorial Trophy as all–Newfoundland and Labrador Senior Hockey Champions and winners of the 2011 Allan Cup as National Senior "AAA" Hockey Champions.

== History ==
The following season proved to be an even bigger improvement for the team. In the club's third year in the League, the 2008-2009 season, the team went to the playoffs to win against the Grand Falls-Windsor Cataracts, and got revenge on the Deer Lake Red Wings, defeating them in the next round. The Caribous went on to play the Conception Bay North CeeBee Stars in the final, and won the series 4-1. Clarenville won the Herder Memorial Trophy for the first time in club history.

In the Summer of 2009, the Caribous applied for Sr. AAA status to compete in future Allan Cup National Championship events. After winning the 2010 WCSHL Championship, the Caribous took home their second straight Herder Memorial Trophy by beating CBN for the second year in a row, 4-1. The Caribous were winless (0-3) at the 2010 Allan Cup in Fort St. John, British Columbia.

In 2010-11, the Caribous went 14-10-0-0 for second place in the WCSHL. They were eliminated in the league semi-final by Deer Lake to end their hopes for a third straight league title and Herder Trophy. Again registered with Hockey Canada as Senior AAA, the Caribous traveled west to Kenora, Ontario to compete at the 2011 Allan Cup. The Caribous went undefeated (4-0), beating Alberta's Bentley Generals 5-3 in the final to win their first and Newfoundland and Labrador's second ever Allan Cup.

== Seasons and Records ==
=== Season-by-season results ===
Led league in points†	Herder Trophy champions‡

Note: GP = Games played, W = Wins, L = Losses, T = Ties, OTL = Overtime Losses, Pts = Points, GF = Goals for, GA = Goals against, DNQ = Did not qualify

WCSHL = West Coast Senior Hockey League, NSHL = Newfoundland Senior Hockey League, CWSHL = Central West Senior Hockey League

Clarenville Caribous regular season and postseason statistics and results, 2006–present
Season	League	Regular season									Postseason					
Season	League	GP	W	L	T	OTL	GF	GA	PTS	Finish	GP	W	L	GF	GA	Result
2006-07	WCSHL	20	19	6		1	133	100	18							Lost in WCSHL finals to Deer Lake Red Wings
2007-08	WCSHL	23	16	5		2	115	99	30†	1st						Lost in WCSHL finals to Deer Lake Red Wings
2008-09	WCSHL	24	14	9		1	134	109	29	2nd						Won Herder vs. Conception Bay CeeBee Stars, 4-1‡
2009-10	WCSHL	24	16	6		2	104	81	34†	1st						Won Herder vs. Conception Bay CeeBee Stars, 4-1‡
2010-11	WCSHL	24	14	10		0	106	99	28	2nd						Lost semi-final, won Allan Cup
2011-12	NSHL	24	15	5		2			36†	1st						Won Herder vs. Grand Falls-Windsor Cataracts, 4-1‡
2012-13	NSHL	24	15	7		2	119	100	32	2nd						Lost in Herder final
2013-14	NSHL	24	13	6		5	116	81	31	2nd						
2014-15	CWSHL	24	13	10		1	110	94	27	3rd						
2015-16	CWSHL	22	10	11	-	1	90	96	21	3rd	7	3	4	22	22	Lost in league semi-finals to Corner Brook Royals, 3-4
2016-17	CWSHL	16	8	8	-	0	61	57	16	2nd						Defeated Grand Falls-Windsor Cataracts in League finals
2017-18	CWSHL	16	9	7	-	0	69	64	18	2nd						Won Herder, defeated St. John's Senior Caps, 4-0

== Allan Cup results ==
Season	Location	GP	W	L	T	OTL	GF	GA	Results	Playoffs
2010	Fort St. John, BC	3	0	3	0	0	8	20	3rd Pool Two	Lost quarter-final
2011	Kenora, Ontario	4	4	0	0	0	15	7	1st Pool One	Won Allan Cup
2013	Red Deer, Alberta	4	3	1	0	0	18	10	1st Pool One	Lost in Final
2014	Dundas, Ontario	4	3	1	0	0	18	8	1st Pool One	Lost in Final
2015	Clarenville, NL	4	2	2	0	0	10	9	2nd Division two	Lost in semi-final (South East Prairie Thunder)

== Current roster ==
For the current team roster see Caribous profile on the league website

== Leaders ==
=== Captains ===
- Dustin Russell (2006-2015)
- Andrew Sweetland (2015-2016)

=== Coaches ===
- Randy Pearcey (2006-2010)
- Ivan Hapgood (2014-2016)
- Rebecca Russell (2016-)

== Trophies and awards ==
=== Team awards ===
- Three all-Newfoundland senior hockey championships (Herder Memorial Trophy): 2009, 2010, 2012
- Awarded the Allan Cup in 2011 as the national senior amateur men's ice hockey champions of Canada.

=== Individual awards ===
S. E Tuma Memorial Trophy (Top scorer in the regular season)

- Andrew Sweetland, 2013 (42 pts)

T.A. (Gus) Soper Memorial Award (MVP in the regular season)

President's Goaltender's Award (Top goaltender in the regular season of operating Senior A leagues)

Top Defenseman

Rookie of the year

Coach of the Year

Howie Clouter Memorial Trophy (Most Gentlemanly and effective player)

Cliff Gorman Memorial Award (Most valuable player of the Herder Playoffs)

== Honoured Members ==
=== Retired numbers ===
- #27 Les Stanley (1962-1980)
- #2 Bill Norcott (1963-1975)
- #7 Robert Gladney (1981-1983)

== Clarenville Caribous Logo ==
- Caribous logo created by Newfoundland artist Reilly Fitzgerald and web developer Todd Cole (2006)

== See also ==
- List of ice hockey teams in Newfoundland and Labrador
