= Deer Lake Red Wings =

Ice hockey team

The Deer Lake Red Wings are a senior ice hockey team based in Deer Lake, Newfoundland and Labrador as a part of the Central West Senior Hockey League (CWSHL).

In 2026, they won the Herder Memorial Trophy for the second year in a row, and the fourth time overall.

== Notable players ==
- Darren Langdon, former NHL player. He played 521 games in the NHL with the New York Rangers, Carolina Hurricanes, Vancouver Canucks, Montreal Canadiens and New Jersey Devils.
- Harold Druken, former NHL player. He played 146 games in the NHL with the Vancouver Canucks and Toronto Maple Leafs.
- Keith Kinkaid, former NHL player. He played 169 games in the NHL with the New Jersey Devils, Montreal Canadiens, New York Rangers, Boston Bruins, and Colorado Avalanche.

== See also ==
- List of ice hockey teams in Newfoundland and Labrador
