= List of nature centers in Pennsylvania =

Pennsylvania Nature Centers (Hover mouse over pog to popup clickable link)

This is a list of nature centers and environmental education centers in the state of Pennsylvania.

To use the sortable tables: click on the icons at the top of each column to sort that column in alphabetical order; click again for reverse alphabetical order.

Name	Location	County	Region	Summary
Abernathy Field Station	Washington	Washington	Pittsburgh Metro Area	57-acre (230,000 m2) outdoor ecology classroom serving Washington & Jefferson College
Asbury Woods	Erie	Erie	Northwest Region	website, regional nature center with over 205 acres and 4.5 miles of hiking trails
Berks Nature	Berks	Berks	SouthEast Region	website, regional nature center with over 100 acres, trails, and education center
Beechwood Farms Nature Reserve	Fox Chapel	Allegheny	Pittsburgh Metro Area	134-acre (0.5 km2) protected area, headquarters of the Audubon Society of Western Pennsylvania
Benjamin Olewine III Nature Center	Harrisburg	Dauphin	Cumberland Valley	Located in 210-acre Wildwood Park
Boyce Park Nature Center	Monroeville	Allegheny	Pittsburgh Metro Area	Operated by the County, displays include animals, plants, rocks and fossils, live animals
Briar Bush Nature Center	Abington	Montgomery	Delaware Valley	website, 12.5 acres, includes Dede Long Nature Museum, seasonal butterfly house, bird observatory
Carbon County Environmental Education Center	Summit Hill	Carbon	Lehigh Valley	website, operated by the County, located on 70 acres within Mauch Chunk Lake Park
Churchville Nature Center	Churchville	Bucks	Delaware Valley	Operated by the County, 55 acres, includes a visitor center with interpretive exhibits, 2 miles of trails, and a re-created Lenape Indian Village
Elk Country Visitor Center	Benezette	Elk	Central PA	website, educational exhibits, multimedia experiences, hands-on learning opportunities and education programs focused on elk, operated by the Pennsylvania Department of Conservation and Natural Resources and the Keystone Elk Country Alliance
Fern Hollow Nature Center	Sewickley	Allegheny	Pittsburgh Metro Area	website, 33 acres
Frick Environmental Center	Pittsburgh	Allegheny	Pittsburgh Metro Area	Located in 561-acre Frick Park that includes the 151-acre Frick Woods Nature Reserve
Great Valley Nature Center	Devault	Chester	Delaware Valley	10 acres, includes a Bird of Prey center, replica Native American Lenape village and a maple sugar house
Harrison Hills Park Environmental Learning Center	Natrona Heights	Allegheny	Pittsburgh Metro Area	500 acres, operated by the County
Hawk Mountain Sanctuary	Hamburg	Berks	Pennsylvania Dutch Country	1,400 acre sanctuary, prime location for the viewing of kettling and migrating raptors
Honey Hollow Environmental Education Center	Solebury Township	Bucks	Delaware Valley	website, operated by the Bucks County Audubon Society, 700 acres with 6 miles of trails, focus is the Honey Hollow Watershed
Jacobsburg Environmental Education Center	Bushkill Township	Northampton	Lehigh Valley	1,168-acre state park
Jarrett Nature Center	Horsham	Montgomery	Delaware Valley	website, operated by and for the Hatboro-Horsham School District
Jennings Environmental Education Center	Brady	Butler	Pittsburgh Metro Area	300-acre state park
John Heinz National Wildlife Refuge at Tinicum	Philadelphia	Philadelphia	Delaware Valley	Features the Cusano Environmental Education Center at the 1,000-acre refuge
John James Audubon Center at Mill Grove	Audubon	Montgomery	Delaware Valley	Historic first U.S. home of John James Audubon, museum features a combination of nature, art, and history and houses all of Audubon’s major works including “Birds of America”; 5 miles of trails. It also serves as the headquarters for Audubon PA.
Kings Gap Environmental Education and Training Center		Cumberland	Pennsylvania Dutch Country	1,454-acre state park including Cooke, Dickinson and Penn Townships
Lacawac	Lake Ariel	Wayne	Northeastern Pennsylvania	545 acres, former summer estate, public programs, trails, house tours
Lancaster Environmental Center	Lancaster	Lancaster	Pennsylvania Dutch Country	website, operated by the County in 544-acre Lancaster County Central Park
Latodami Nature Center at North Park	Wexford	Allegheny	Pittsburgh Metro Area	250 acres, operated by the County
Lehigh Gap Nature Center	Lehigh Gap	Carbon	Lehigh Valley	Over 750 acres with 13 miles of marked trails
McKaig Nature Education Center	Wayne	Montgomery	Delaware Valley	website, 89 acres of woods, 3 miles of well marked trails, 2 streams
McKeever Environmental Learning Center	Sandy Lake	Mercer	Northwestern PA	website, administered by Slippery Rock University, 205 acres, residential and non-residential programs for schools
Millbrook Marsh Nature Center	State College	Centre	Central PA	website, operated by Centre Region Parks & Recreation, 62-acre site consisting of a 12-acre farmstead area and an adjacent 50-acre wetland area
Kettle Creek Environmental Education Center	Stroudsburg	Monroe	Northeastern Pennsylvania	website, located in the 166-acre Kettle Creek Wildlife Sanctuary, operated by the County
Mount Pisgah State Park	Troy	Bradford	Northeastern Pennsylvania	Environmental interpretive center houses artifacts and displays about area wildlife and early farm life, nature programs
Myrick Conservation Center	West Chester	Chester	Delaware Valley	website, 318 acres, operated by the Brandywine Valley Association and the Red Clay Valley Association, focus is watershed conservation
Ned Smith Center for Nature and Art	Millersburg	Dauphin	Cumberland Valley	website, includes collection of works by wildlife artist Ned Smith, changing exhibits of contemporary artists and photographers, over 500 acres, research program about northern saw-whet owls
Nescopeck State Park	Butler	Luzerne	Northeastern Pennsylvania	3,550-acre state park with seasonal education center
Nolde Forest Environmental Education Center	Cumru	Berks	Pennsylvania Dutch Country	665-acre state park
Nurture Nature Center	Easton	Northampton	Lehigh Valley	website, combines science, art and community dialogue about community environmental issues, features Science On a Sphere exhibit
Peace Valley Nature Center	Doylestown	Bucks	Delaware Valley	1,500-acre park and nature center, operated by the County
Pennypack Ecological Restoration Trust	Huntingdon Valley	Montgomery	Delaware Valley	website, 812 acres with a visitor center
Pocono Environmental Education Center	Dingmans Ferry	Pike	Northeastern Pennsylvania	website, located within the 77,000-acre Delaware Water Gap National Recreation Area
Pool Wildlife Sanctuary	Emmaus	Lehigh	Lehigh Valley	website, 77.5 acres, Wildlands Conservancy's main office, features the Air Products Environmental Education Center
Powdermill Nature Reserve	Rector	Westmoreland	Pittsburgh Metro Area	website, environmental research center of Carnegie Museum of Natural History, over 2,200 acres
Richard Nixon Park Nature Center	York	York	Pennsylvania Dutch Country	website, operated by the County on 187 acres, displays include local wildlife and mounted specimens from the Arctic, African savanna and Northwest Territories of the United States
Riverbend Environmental Education Center	Gladwyne	Montgomery	Delaware Valley	website, 30 acres
Shaver's Creek Environmental Center	Petersburg	Huntingdon	Central PA	Located in the 700-acre Stone Valley Recreation Area
Silver Lake Nature Center	Bristol	Bucks	Delaware Valley	website, 235 acres with over 4 miles of trails, operated by the County
South Park Nature Center	South Park	Allegheny	Pittsburgh Metro Area	2,013-acre park, operated by the County
Strawberry Hill Nature Preserve	Fairfield	Adams	Pennsylvania Dutch Country	609 acres with over 10 miles of trails
The Schuylkill Center	Philadelphia	Philadelphia	Delaware Valley	website, 340 acres with over 3 miles of trails, exhibits, art gallery, wildlife rehabilitation clinic
Tom Ridge Environmental Center	Erie	Erie	Northwest Region	Located in 3,112-acre Presque Isle State Park
Trexler Environmental Center	Schnecksville	Lehigh	Lehigh Valley	1,108 acres in the Trexler Nature Preserve, operated by the County
Tyler Arboretum	Media	Delaware	Delaware Valley	650 acres, 20 miles of hiking trails through woodlands, wetlands, and meadows, environmental education programs
Welkinweir	Pottstown	Chester	Delaware Valley	197-acre arboretum, garden, mansion, and conservation area, education programs, home of the Green Valleys Association
Whites' Woods Nature Center	White	Indiana	Pittsburgh Metro Area	250 acres of mature forest
Wildlife Center at Sinnemahoning State Park	Grove Township	Cameron	Central PA	1,910-acre park visitor center with natural history exhibits, wildlife viewing area, programs
Winnie Palmer Nature Reserve at Saint Vincent College	Latrobe	Westmoreland	Pittsburgh Metro Area	website, 26 acres
Woodcock Creek Nature Center	Meadville	Crawford	Northwest Region	website, operated by the Crawford County Conservation District
