= Penn State Nittany Lions =

Intercollegiate sports teams of Penn State University

- University: Pennsylvania State University
- Nickname: Nittany Lions and Lady Lions
- NCAA: Division I (FBS)
- Conference: Big Ten (primary); Atlantic Hockey America (women's ice hockey); EIVA (men's volleyball)
- Athletic director: Pat Kraft
- Location: State College, Pennsylvania
- Varsity teams: 31
- Football stadium: Beaver Stadium
- Basketball arena: Bryce Jordan Center
- Ice hockey arena: Pegula Ice Arena
- Baseball stadium: Medlar Field at Lubrano Park
- Softball stadium: Nittany Lion Softball Park
- Soccer stadium: Jeffrey Field
- Aquatics center: McCoy Natatorium
- Lacrosse stadium: Panzer Stadium
- Other venues: Holuba Hall; Lorenzo Wrestling Complex; Louis and Mildred Lasch Football Building; Multi-Sport Facility & Horace Ashenfelter III Indoor Track; Penn State Field Hockey Complex; Penn State Golf Courses; Rec Hall; Sarni Tennis Center
- Colors: Blue and white
- Mascot: Nittany Lion
- Fight song: Fight On, State
- Website: www.gopsusports.com

Big Ten logo in Penn State's colors.

The Penn State Nittany Lions are the athletic teams of Pennsylvania State University, except for the women's basketball team, known as the Lady Lions. The school colors are navy blue and white. The school mascot is the Nittany Lion. The intercollegiate athletics logo was commissioned in 1983.

For most sports, Penn State participates as a member institution of the Big Ten Conference and NCAA Division I of the National Collegiate Athletic Association (NCAA), the highest level of collegiate level play. It is one of only 15 universities in the nation that plays Division I FBS football and Division I men's ice hockey. Two sports, men's volleyball and women's ice hockey, participate in different conferences because they are not offered in the Big Ten Conference. The men's volleyball team competes in the Eastern Intercollegiate Volleyball Association (EIVA) and women's ice hockey competes in Atlantic Hockey America (AHA). The fencing teams operate as independents.

Penn State has finished in the top 25 in every NACDA Directors' Cup final poll, a feat only matched by nine other institutions: Stanford, UCLA, USC, Florida, Ohio State, Texas, North Carolina, and Michigan. The NACDA Director's Cup is a list compiled by the National Association of Collegiate Directors of Athletics that charts institutions' overall success in college sports. Penn State's highest finish came in the 1998–99 standings when the Nittany Lions finished 3rd. PSU finished in 5th place in the 2013–14 standings; it was the fifth time the program finished in the top 5 and the tenth time the program finished in the top 10.

Penn State joined the Big Ten in 1991, after being a member of the Atlantic 10 Conference from 1976–79 and 1982-91.

== Sports ==
Men's sports	Women's sports
Baseball	Basketball
Basketball	Cross country
Cross country	Field hockey
Football	Golf
Golf	Gymnastics
Gymnastics	Ice hockey
Ice hockey	Lacrosse
Lacrosse	Soccer
Soccer	Softball
Swimming & diving	Swimming & diving
Tennis	Tennis
Track and field^{†}	Track and field^{†}
Volleyball	Volleyball
Wrestling	
Co-ed sports
Fencing
† – Track and field includes both indoor and outdoor.

=== Baseball ===
Penn State baseball currently plays their home games at 5,570-seat Medlar Field and have been coached by Mike Gambino since the 2024 season. Since joining the Big Ten, the Nittany Lions won the 1996 regular season title and advanced to the Big Ten Tournament championship game twice, most recently in 2024.

Throughout its history, Penn State has played in 17 NCAA baseball tournaments, advancing to the College World Series five times (1952, 1957, 1959, 1963, 1973) and finishing as runners-up to California in 1957. Penn State's most recent College World Series appearance came in 1973, while its most recent NCAA tournament berth came in 2000, when the Nittany Lions won the Montclair Regional before falling in the Austin Super Regional.

=== Basketball ===
==== Men's basketball ====
Penn State's men's basketball program reached the Final Four once in 1954, though the best postseason finish in recent years occurred in 2001 with a trip to the Sweet Sixteen of the NCAA tournament after a win over UNC in the round of 32. The most recent postseason championship for Penn State was the 2018 National Invitation Tournament on March 29, 2018. Penn State outscored Utah 82–66 to capture its second men's basketball national title in school history and its third postseason tournament title since winning the Atlantic-10 Tournament in 1991. The Nittany Lions lost in the first round of the 2011 NCAA tournament and appeared in the 2023 NCAA tournament, falling to the Texas Longhorns in the second round.

Notable alumni include: Frank Brickowski, John Amaechi, Calvin Booth, Mike Costello, Stanley Pringle, Geary Claxton, Jamelle Cornley, Lamar Stevens. Mike Rhodes is the current coach.

==== Women's basketball ====
The Lady Lions, the Penn State women's basketball team and the only athletic team not known as "Nittany Lions", have had more success than their male counterparts, often gaining berths into the women's NCAA tournament, reaching the Final Four once in 2000. The Lady Lions have reached the NCAA tournament more than any other Big Ten team with 25 appearances as of 2014. The Lady Lions have won 8 Big Ten Regular Season Championships and 2 Big Ten tournament Championships. The most recent postseason championship won by Penn State was the 1998 Women's National Invitation Tournament. Carolyn Kieger was in her second season as head coach of the Lady Lions in 2020–21.

=== Boxing ===
Penn State organized its boxing program in 1919 under the direction of Dick Harlow. He was succeeded by Leo Florian Hauck, who remained head coach until his death in 1950. His assistant, Ed Sulkowski, served as head coach until the program was dropped in 1954 due to lack of interest. Penn State won the first NCAA boxing tournament in 1932, which it also hosted. The Lions also won pre-NCAA national titles in 1924, 1927, 1929, and 1930, during the time of a boxing rivalry with Navy.

=== Cross country ===
The men's cross country team won NCAA titles in 1942, 1947, and 1950. Before the NCAA began sponsoring the cross country championship in 1938, and unlike today, the annual ICAAAA meet was a premier national championship event for track and field and cross country. The team won ICAAAA championships in 1926, 1927, 1928 and 1930. Penn State runners won the individual ICAAAA titles in 1920 (John Romig), 1927 and 1928 (William Cox, consecutively). PSU men also won ICAAAA team titles in 1950, 1951, 1960 and 2000, as well as individual crowns in 1938, 1946, 1987 and 2004.

=== Fencing ===
Penn State has been a fencing powerhouse, having won a record 13 national championships in the sport since the NCAA began awarding titles in combined men's and women's fencing in 1990. The team finished as champion or runner-up in 21 of the first 25 years of the combined tournament. The program won six consecutive NCAA Championships from 1995 to 2000.

Emmanuil G. Kaidanov was the coach of the fencing squads during most of that period. The women's fencing team won national AIAW titles in 1980 and 1981, followed by an NCAA championship in 1983. The team recruits both nationally and throughout the world.

Andrew Mackiewicz won the NCAA Men's Sabre Championship in both his freshman and sophomore years, in 2015 and 2016, and went on to compete for the United States in the 2020 Tokyo Olympics in 2021.

Penn State Nittany Lions assistant fencing coach George G. Abashidze, after a United States Center for SafeSport investigation found he had committed sexual misconduct by groping female fencing coach Jennifer Oldham in 2017, was banned by USA Fencing from its activities for three years due to his conduct, prompting Penn State to terminate him on March 4, 2019, ending his 10-year tenure with the team. A Penn State investigation into the matter confirmed Oldham's assault and harassment claims against Abashidze, but maintained that the assistant coach had not violated any university policies. Oldham sued Penn State in 2020, charging that it had tried to cover up the incident.

In May 2020, a complaint was filed by Oldham after Glon allegedly failed to report sexual misconduct groping allegations against his assistant coach, George Abashidze. After an investigation by SafeSport into the same matter, finding Abashidze responsible, he was ultimately required to serve a six-month term of probation for such failure.

In September 2022, Penn State placed head fencing coach Wes Glon on paid leave pending more information about restrictions imposed on him by USA Fencing; he subsequently retired in April 2023. In April 2022, a former Penn State fencer had filed a federal complaint in the United States District Court for the Middle District of Pennsylvania against Glon and the university alleging physical, verbal, and psychological abuse by Glon. In an August 2023 ruling that allowed Moss' lawsuit to proceed, U.S. District Court Judge Matthew Brann wrote that Glon's alleged conduct "crossed the line between aggressive coaching and sexual harassment, and was "certainly unbecoming of a collegiate athletic professional." In October 2024, the fencer, university, and Glon settled the lawsuit.

=== Field hockey ===
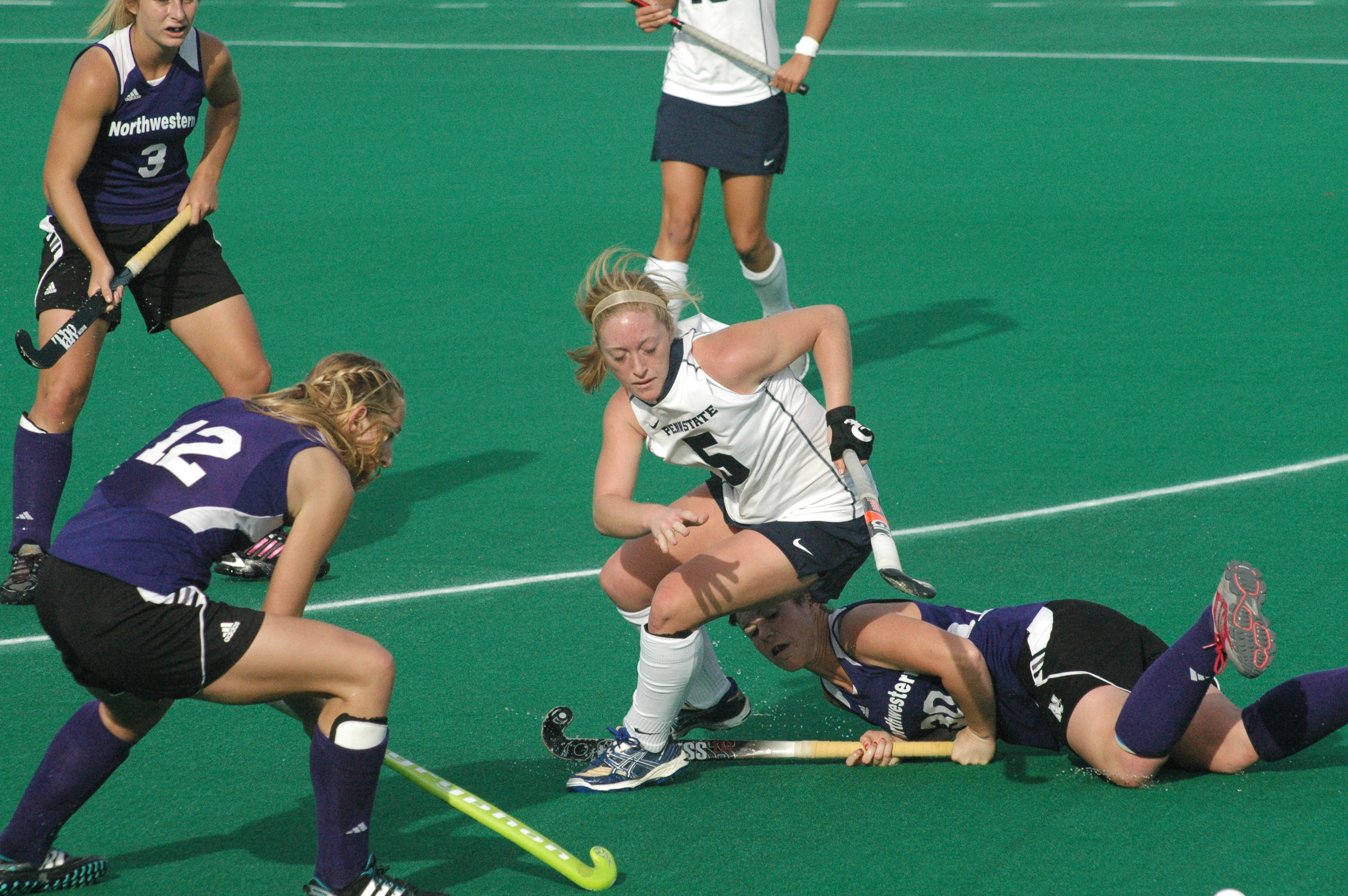
Penn State (in white) v Northwestern match in 2011

The women's field hockey team is coached by Char Morett, a former Penn State field hockey player herself and 1984 Olympic bronze medalist.

Penn State is one of the premier programs in the nation with 28 NCAA Tournament appearances, the third most in the nation. Since joining the Big Ten in 1992, the Nittany Lions have been dominant with more Big Ten Tournament titles than any other team and the second most regular season titles behind Michigan.

In 2007, the women's field hockey team reached the National Championship game, but fell to undefeated UNC, 3–0. In their tournament run, they were able to defeat two-time defending champion Maryland, 1–0, and defending national runner-up Wake Forest, 2–0. Jen Long was nominated for the Honda Award for her efforts. They also finished as NCAA runners-up in 2002, losing to Wake Forest in the title game 2–0 after defeating Old Dominion 3–2 in the semifinals. 2002 marked the first time Penn State reached the NCAA Finals and second time reaching the Final Four. The team won the AIAW national championships in 1980 and 1981. In 2011 the women's field hockey team won its fifth ever Big Ten title after defeating Michigan 3–2, and first since 1998 when they again defeated Michigan 3–1.

=== Football ===
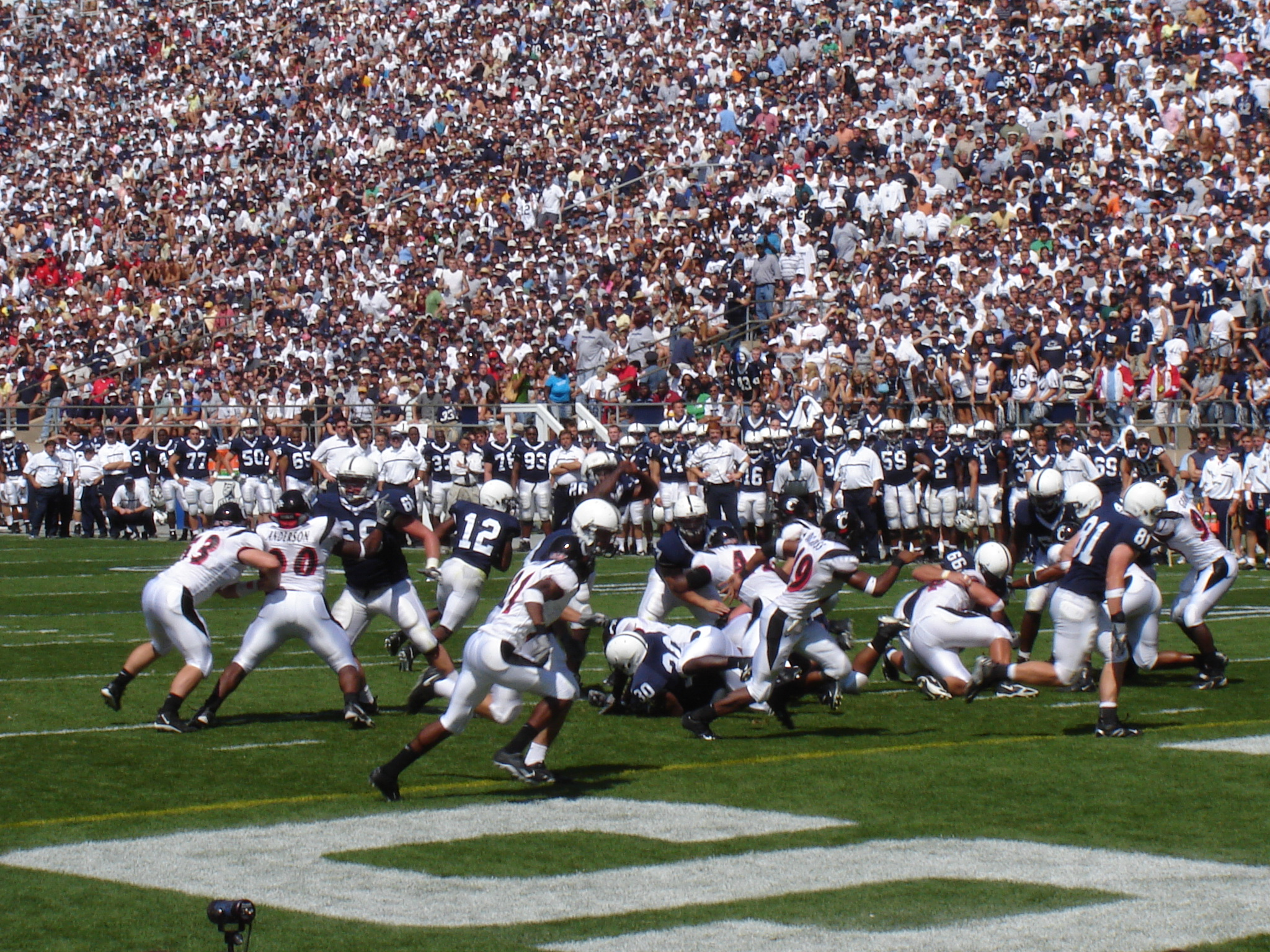
Penn State's football team

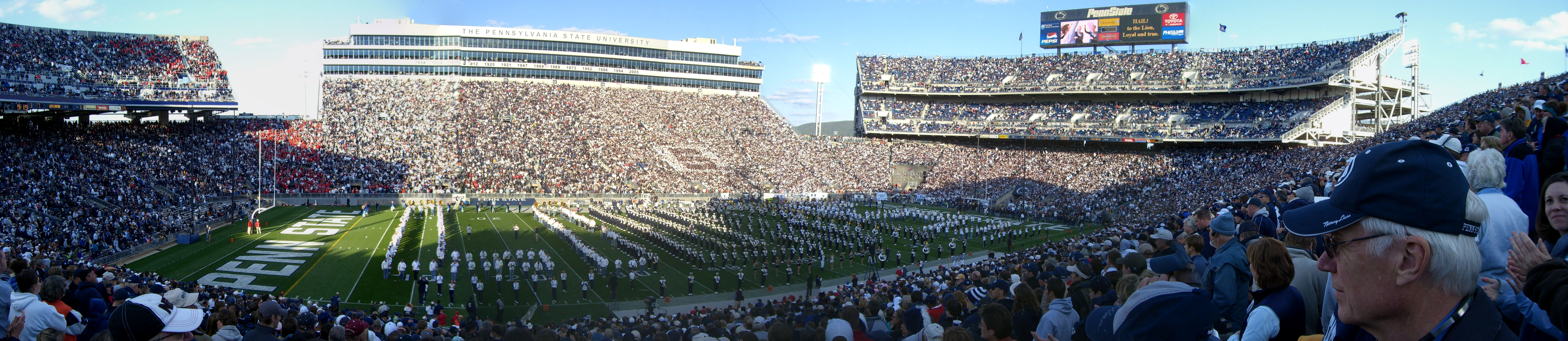
Panorama of the crowd at Beaver Stadium on October 13, 2007

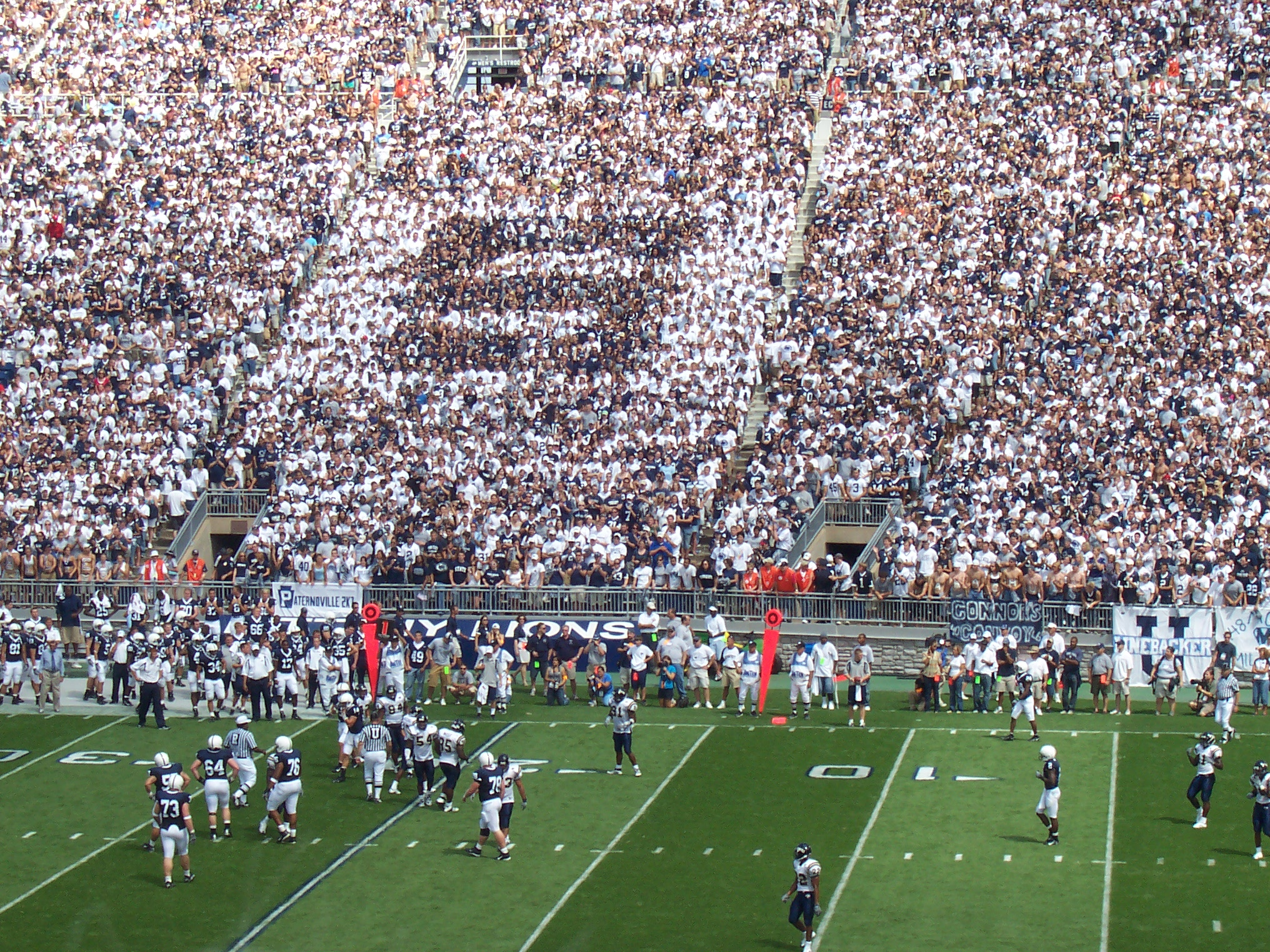
The Senior Section at Beaver Stadium, dressed to spell out the letter "S"

Penn State has a large football following and attracts tens of thousands of visitors to its campus; the surrounding area is known as "Happy Valley" for tailgating and games on autumn Saturdays in Beaver Stadium. The largest crowd ever at Beaver Stadium was on November 2nd, 2024, as 111,030 people watched the Nittany Lions fall to the Ohio State Buckeyes by a score of 20 to 13. The school has earned a reputation as "Linebacker U" for the number of high-quality linebackers trained. Joe Paterno was the head coach for the Nittany Lion football team from 1966 until he was fired on November 9, 2011, in the aftermath of the Penn State child sex abuse scandal. He was regarded as one of the most successful national coaches, holding the record for wins and bowl appearance. Penn State plays in two football "trophy games" with other members of the Big Ten: the Governor's Victory Bell with the University of Minnesota and the Land Grant Trophy game versus Michigan State University.

Prior to joining the Big Ten, Penn State was one of the strongest of the independent schools in college football. They played a number of schools regularly, including Pitt, Syracuse, West Virginia, Notre Dame, Maryland, and Alabama. Penn State has won the prestigious Lambert-Meadowlands Trophy, awarded for Eastern football supremacy, a record 29 times as of 2013. Penn State has also been named the ECAC FBS Team of the Year for a record 13th time.

Penn State won consensus National Championships in 1982 and 1986, both under Paterno. The 1986 team won by defeating the University of Miami in the 1987 Fiesta Bowl, which remains one of the most watched college football games in history. The school has had a number of other undefeated teams including 1909, 1911, 1912, 1920, 1921, 1947, 1968, 1969, 1973, and 1994, some of which have been awarded national championships by various selecting organizations. Penn State currently has a FBS bowl record of 31–20–2.

Penn State is also among the leaders nationwide in terms of players advancing to the professional level. As of 2006, 29 former Penn State players and coaches were on the rosters of NFL teams, the tenth-highest such placement rate in the country. Penn State has been represented in at least one of the teams participating in the Super Bowl 37 of the 41 times the championship game has been played.

A report indicated that Penn State's football program ranks 12th nationwide in terms of economic contributions to each program's university, athletic department, conference, and community. The report, based on ticket sales, sponsorships, football program expenses, athletic department expenses (non-football), shared conference profits, and county revenue figures during home football games, revealed that the Nittany Lions are presently worth roughly US$63 million.

In July 2012, the NCAA announced several punitive measures as a result of the Penn State child sex abuse scandal. In addition to vacating all wins between 1998 and 2011, Penn State was banned from post-season play for four years, and the number of scholarships was reduced. Players were free to transfer during the 2012 season without sitting out a year, but few did so. After details of the case emerged, the NCAA restored all vacated wins and rescinded both the remaining ban on post-season play and scholarship reduction.

=== Gymnastics ===
In 2007, the men's gymnastics team won their NCAA record 14th national championship, by defeating powerhouse Oklahoma at Rec Hall, with the score of 221.000–220.200, denying them a three-peat. The women's team won the AIAW national championship twice, in 1978 and 1980, edging out other dominant teams such as Cal State-Fullerton and Utah.

=== Ice hockey ===
==== Men's ice hockey ====
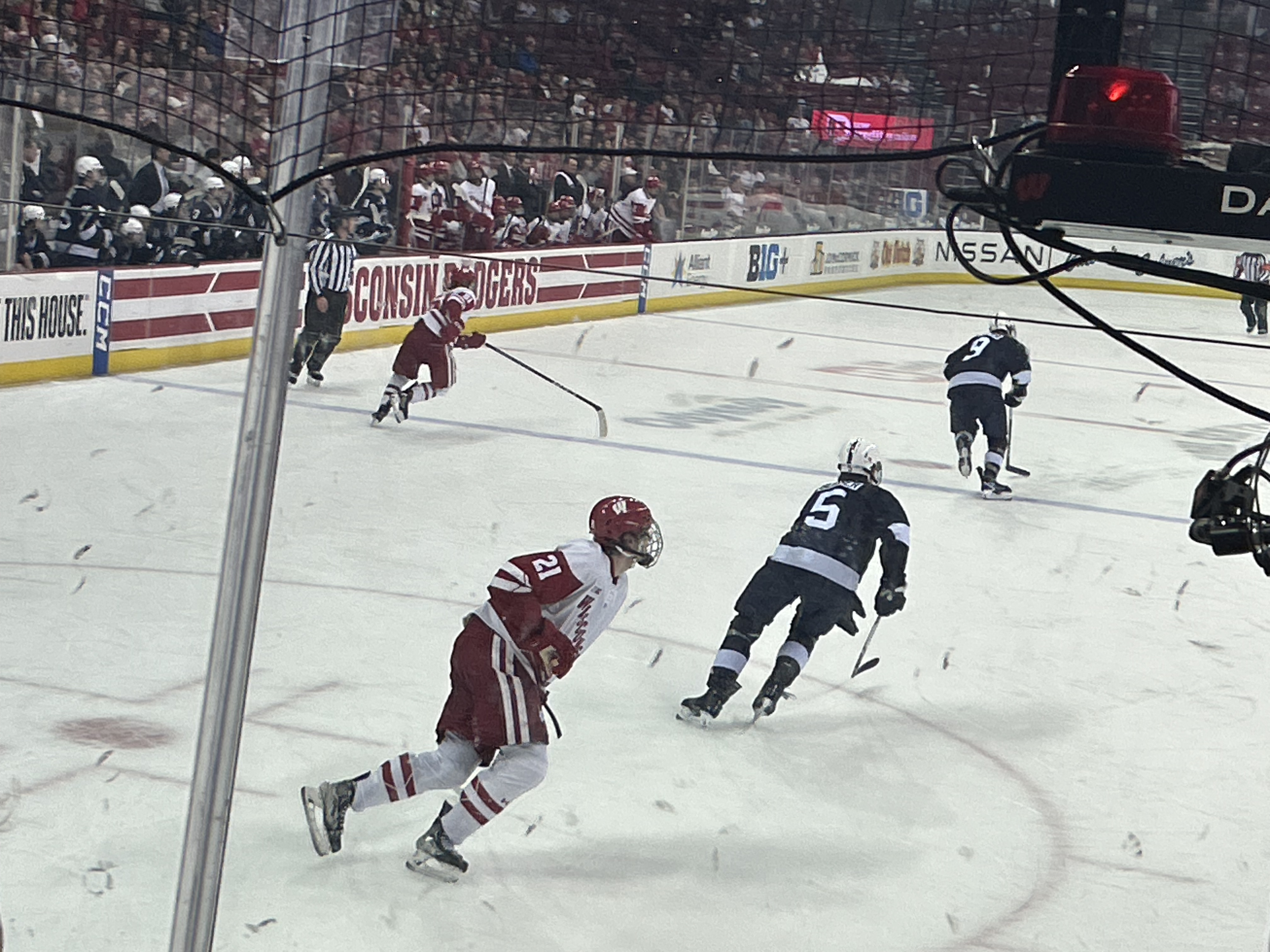
Penn State v Wisconsing game in 2023

Aside from five years in the 1940s, the men's ice hockey program has had varsity status since the 2012–13 season. The team plays in the Pegula Ice Arena and competed as an independent Division I team in the 2012–2013 season. In the 2013–2014 season, the team began play in the Big Ten conference's first year of sponsorship of men's ice hockey. Recently, the team achieved the number one ranking in Division I men's hockey for the first time in program history.

Before becoming a varsity program, the men's ice hockey team, the Icers, competed at the American Collegiate Hockey Association (ACHA) Men's Division I level and was a member of the Eastern States Collegiate Hockey League (ESCHL) from 2007–08 through 2010–11. Penn State won seven ACHA DI National Championships in 1984, 1990, 1998, 2000, 2001, 2002, and 2003. The Division II men's hockey club team were champions of the University Hockey League during the 2003–04 and 2001–02 seasons; they were runners-up during the 2002–03, 2000–01, and 1998–99 seasons.

==== Women's ice hockey ====
The women's program moved to NCAA Division I level beginning in the 2012–13 season and joined College Hockey America (CHA), becoming the fifth member of the conference. After the 2023–24 season, CHA merged with the Atlantic Hockey Association to form Atlantic Hockey America. The team also plays in the Pegula Ice Arena.

Before becoming a varsity program, the women's ice hockey team, the Lady Icers, competed at the ACHA Women's Division I level in the Eastern Collegiate Women's Hockey League (ECWHL).

=== Lacrosse ===
The Penn State women's lacrosse teams have won two NCAA titles, in addition to three United States Women's Lacrosse Association championships in 1978, 1979, and 1980.

The Penn State men's lacrosse team dates to 1913. Penn State has appeared in four NCAA Men's Lacrosse Championship tournaments, including in 2003, 2005, 2013, and 2017.

Penn State has had seven alumni and coaches inducted into the National Lacrosse Hall of Fame, including Mary McCarthy Stefano, Gillian D. Rattray, Barb Jordan, Betsy Williams Dougherty, Candace "Candy" Finn Rocha, Joanne Connelly and Thomas R. Hayes.

=== Soccer ===
==== Men's soccer ====
Before the NCAA began its tournament in 1959, the annual national champion was declared by the Intercollegiate Soccer Football Association from 1926 to 1958, the result of polls and the subjective opinion of the ISFA administrators. In that time, Penn State shared eight national championships and was selected three times as champion outright (1929, 1938, 1954). The rival College Soccer Bowl was held from 1950–1952 in an attempt to decide a national champion on the field. Penn State gained a last-minute tie in the 1950 championship final. The team won in 1951; however, the ISFA failed to select Penn State that year.

==== Women's soccer ====
The women's soccer team won its first NCAA national championship in 2015. The program has been particularly strong in recent years, as the team won 15 straight Big Ten Championships through the 2012 season, which was an all-time Big Ten record for women's teams. The streak surpassed the 12 by Michigan swimming & diving of the 1990s and led the then-ongoing run by Northwestern's women's tennis squad, which had won 14 straight titles through 2011.

=== Softball ===
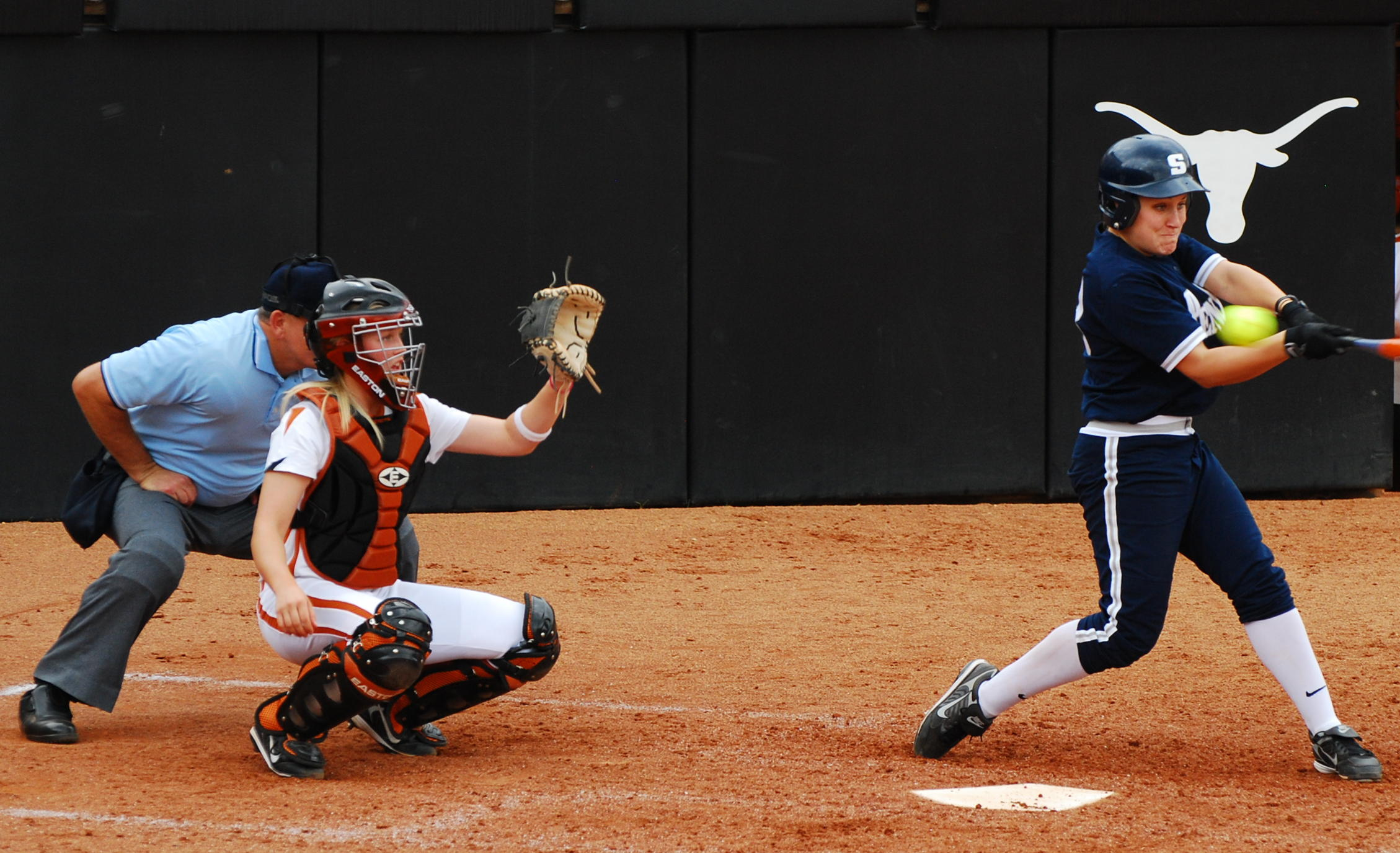
Penn State v Texas game in 2007

The Nittany Lions softball team began play in 1965. The team has made ten NCAA Tournament appearances in 1983, 1985, 2000, 2001, 2002, 2003, 2005, 2006, 2007, 2011 and 2024. The current head coach is Clarisa Crowell.

=== Track and field ===
Before the NCAA began sponsoring an indoor national championship in 1965, the men's indoor track and field team won IC4A titles in 1942 and 1959. PSU men also won IC4A team titles in 1984, 1987, 2001, 2003 and 2006.

=== Volleyball ===
Penn State is home to one of the top men's and women's volleyball programs. Penn State is one of only 5 schools—and the only school not in California—to win an NCAA Championship for both men and women's volleyball, the others being Stanford, UCLA, USC, and Long Beach State.

==== Men's volleyball ====
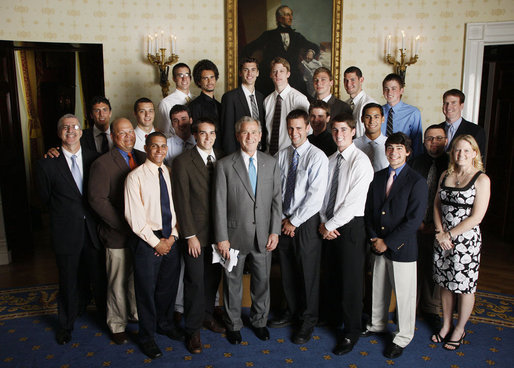
The Penn State men's volleyball team is honored at the White House by President George W. Bush in June 2008 after winning the 2008 NCAA Championship

The men's volleyball team is coached by Mark Pavlik. The program has won two NCAA National Championships in 1994 and 2008 and 16 EIVA titles out of 17 years, including 10 consecutive. They finished as NCAA National runners-up in 1982, 1995 and 2006, to UCLA each time (twice at Rec Hall). They reached the NCAA final four 24 times including 13 out of the last 14 years through the 2008 season and an NCAA record 10 consecutive (1998–2008).

The men's first national title came in 1994, when they beat powerhouse UCLA in five sets after being down 11–4 in the fourth set and then winning the fourth 15–12 and the fifth with the same score. The win made Penn State the first school outside of California in the 24-year history until then to win an NCAA Men's volleyball championship. They won the NCAA title again in 2008, defeating Pepperdine, 3–1. With the win, Penn State men and women's programs swept the volleyball championships in the same academic year, joining Stanford from 1996–97 to be the only schools to accomplish the rare feat.

Pavlik was named the 2008 "National Coach of the Year" by the American Volleyball Coaches Association.

==== Women's volleyball ====
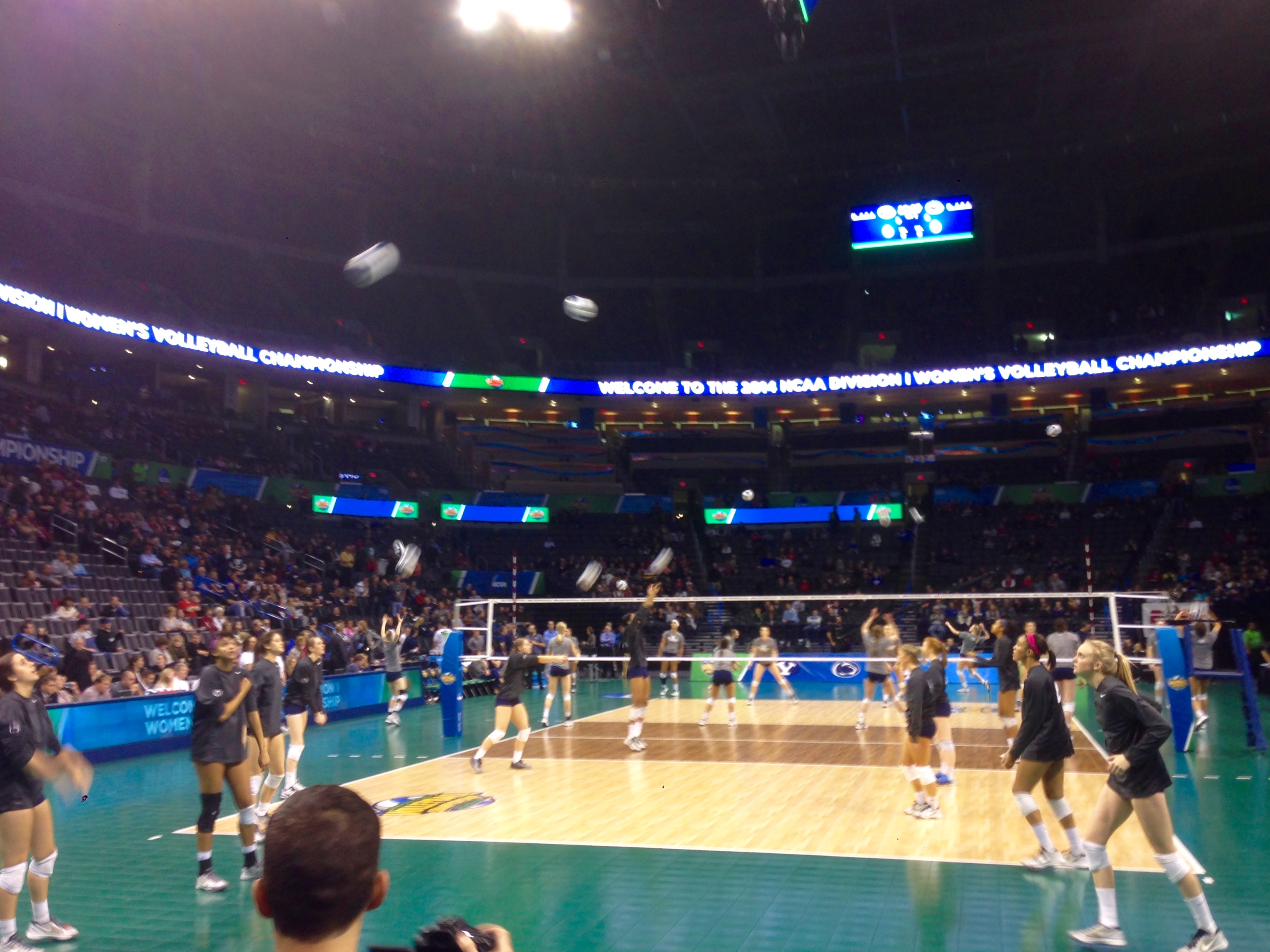
Penn State warming up before the 2014 NCAA championship against Brigham Young University in Oklahoma City, Oklahoma in Chesapeake Energy Arena

The Penn State women's volleyball team, one of the nation's premier volleyball programs, is coached by Russ Rose, who, since his first season in 1979, has led the Nittany Lions to a record of 1,189 and 186, an .865 winning percentage, through the end of 2015. Rose stands as the NCAA Division I all-time winningest coach, as he owns the NCAA Division I Records for win percentage and total victories. Rose has won all but 51 of the program's wins. On December 17, 2009, Rose earned his 1,000th career victory with a win against Hawaiʻi in the 2009 NCAA National Semifinals. In all but one season under Rose, there has been at least one AVCA All-American on his team.

The program is one of only two DI universities to appear in every NCAA tournament (1981–2015). They have won 8 NCAA National Championships, the 2nd most all-time, in 1999, 2007, 2008, 2009, 2010, 2013, 2014, and 2024. They were the national runners-up in 1993, 1997, and 1998 and also reached the Final Four in 1994 and 2012.

The team achieved unprecedented success from 2007–10. The Nittany Lions won four consecutive national titles in that span, the most consecutive titles in NCAA Division I history. In that historic stretch, Penn State won 109 consecutive matches (Sept. 21, 2007-Sept. 10, 2010), 111 consecutive sets (Dec. 15, 2007-Dec. 18, 2008), 94 consecutive home matches (Sept. 1, 2006-Dec. 11, 2010), and 55 consecutive road matches (Sept. 28, 2007-Sept. 10, 2010), all NCAA Division I records.

The Lions were extraordinarily successful when Penn State was in the Atlantic 10 conference, as they won the title all 8 years without losing a single conference match before joining the Big Ten. In the Big Ten, the team has won 16 titles since 1991, including a conference record 8 straight (2003–10). During Big Ten play, Penn State went undefeated 6 times (1998, 1999, 2005, 2007, 2008, 2009).

=== Wrestling ===
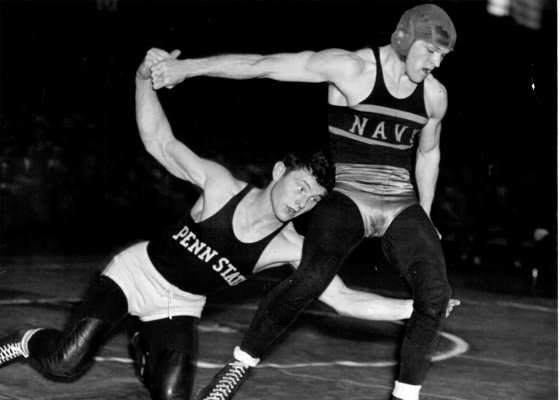
Penn State and Navy wrestlers in 1949

Penn State has one of the most competitive Division I collegiate wrestling programs in the nation. Before joining the Big Ten, Penn State was a member of the Eastern Wrestling League from 1976 to 1992. Before that, Penn State was a member of the Eastern Intercollegiate Wrestling Association (EIWA).

In April 2005, Penn State broke ground on a construction project designed to expand and modernize Rec Hall for the students, faculty, and staff who use the facility. As part of this renovation, Intercollegiate Athletics created the Lorenzo Wrestling Complex which ranks among the nation's finest facilities in the sport.

Under head coach Cael Sanderson, Penn State entered the final session of the 2019 NCAA Championships having already clinched their eighth team title in nine years. Sanderson's squad left the National Finals and PPG Paints Arena with three individual national champions. Penn State had five NCAA finalists for the fourth straight year and won three titles, beginning at 285 with senior Anthony Cassar of Rocky Hill, New Jersey winning his first. Jason Nolf of Yatesboro, Pennsylvania and Bo Nickal of Allen, Texas each won their third straight crowns. The Nittany Lions won the team race with 137.5 points, finishing over 40.0 points ahead of second place Ohio State, which had 96.5. Oklahoma State finished third with 84.0. Penn State was the only team to score over 100.0 points.

Penn State has won 13 NCAA Championships including 12 of the last 14. The Nittany Lions have taken home the title in 1953, 2011, 2012, 2013, 2014, 2016, 2017, 2018, 2019, 2022, 2023, 2024, 2025. Penn State holds the top two highest NCAA Championship points records breaking Iowa's 170-point mark with 172.5 in 2024 and 177 in 2025.

== Team sports ==
Penn State offers a program of "team sports," programs that have not been granted full varsity status but are members of the Athletic Department and receive greater support than club sports. Penn State team sports "compete nationally at the highest level." Rugby (men's and women's) has been a team sport since 2005. Ice Hockey (men's and women's) was a team sport from 2005 until 2011 and has since been elevated to varsity status.

=== Rugby ===
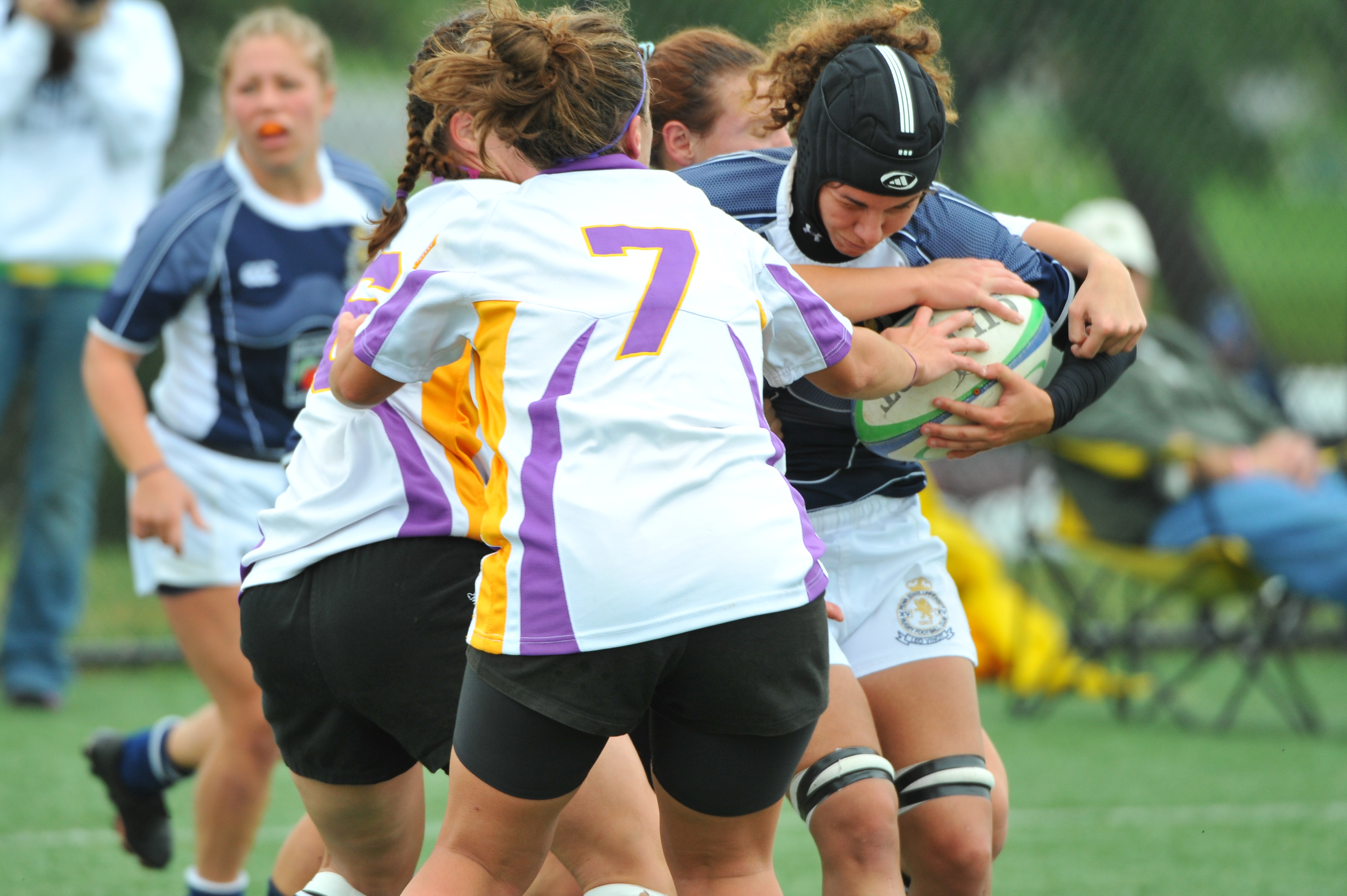
A 2008 Penn State Lady Ruggers match vs West Chester University of Pennsylvania

The Penn State rugby program is classified by the university as a "Team Sport" within Penn State Intercollegiate Athletics Department, and therefore receives university support (paid coaches, facilities, health insurance, etc.) equivalent to a varsity program. As of 2011, Penn State rugby was funded 52% by alumni donations, 32% by player dues, and 16% by university contribution.

Penn State rugby was founded in 1962 and plays in Division 1-A. Penn State has been one of the most successful programs in college rugby. Penn State advanced to the national semifinals 10 times from 1989 to 2007 and reached the finals 5 times from 1989 to 2001. With 76 registered players, Penn State was ranked as the largest college rugby program in the United States in 2009. Penn State made headlines when they defeated favored BYU 48–46 in the 2018 D1A quarterfinal to reach the semifinals.

The women's rugby team has a track record of consistent success, winning national titles in 1997, 2000, 2004, 2007, 2009, 2010, 2012, 2013, 2014, 2015, 2016, and 2017. The 2014 Penn State Women's team won their ninth Collegiate National Championship, with a 58–0 semifinal victory over West Chester University and a 38–0 win in the championship match against Stanford.

=== Rugby sevens ===
Penn State appeared in the first eleven editions (2010–22) of the Collegiate Rugby Championship (CRC), advancing to the quarterfinals seven times. The CRC was conducted annually from 2011–2019 at PPL Park in suburban Philadelphia and was the highest profile college rugby sevens tournament in the U.S. In the 2011 CRC, Penn State beat Ohio State in a 12–10 match to qualify for the quarterfinals, where Penn State lost to eventual champions Dartmouth 7–12.

Penn State has been successful in other rugby sevens competitions. For example, Penn State won the 2011 Subaru 7s tournament, and won the 2012 Halloween 7s tournament led by tournament MVP Blaze Feury. Penn State finished second at the 2012 Big Ten 7s, losing to Wisconsin in the final and missing out on qualification for the 2012 USA Rugby Sevens Collegiate National Championships.

The women's rugby sevens team won the CRC championship in 2013, 2014, and 2015, as well as the USA Rugby sevens national championship in 2015.

== Intercollegiate club sports ==
The university is home to a number of intercollegiate club sports that the university doesn't field at the NCAA level and/or sports not sponsored by the NCAA.

=== Billiards ===
Two Penn State students have won the national intercollegiate individual championship in billiards. In 1982 Thomas Golly won the men's title. In 1988 Janet Dordell captured the women's crown.

=== Crew ===
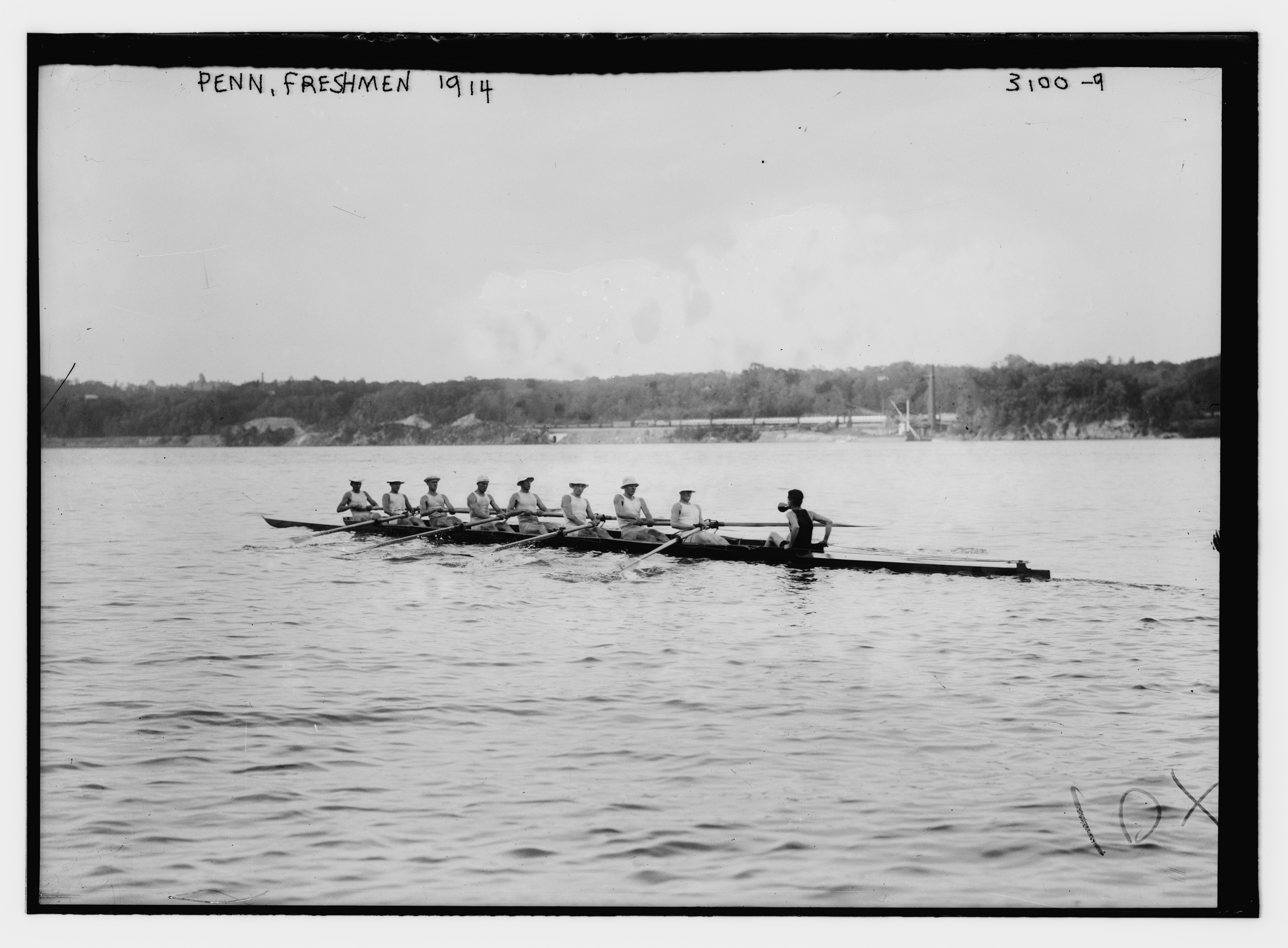
Penn Fresh Crew in 1914

Penn State fields an intercollegiate club rowing team that competes on the national level. The team has participated in several regatta events, including the Aberdeen Dad Vail Regatta and the American Collegiate Rowing Association national championship.

=== Croquet ===
Penn State's Club Croquet team was established in 2010 and has been growing since with nearly 150 members. It serves as the sole croquet team at Penn State and competes each year at the United States Croquet Association (USCA) collegiate championships. In 2017, the team won the USCA Collegiate National Championship in golf croquet.

=== Cross Country ===
The Penn State Club Cross Country is a member of the National Intercollegiate Running Club Association (NIRCA). The women's team has won five NIRCA National Championships (2006, 2009, 2010, 2015, 2016) and the men's team has won one (2019).

=== Gymnastics ===
Penn State Club Gymnastics participates in NAIGC (National Association of Intercollegiate Gymnastics Clubs) competition. In recent history both the men's and women's teams have had great success, including national titles for the men in 2009 and 2010. The women have had similar success with top-five finishes every year since 2009.

=== Ice hockey ===
In addition to the varsity men's and women's ice hockey teams, PSU fields a men's club team in American Collegiate Hockey Association Division 2 and the Atlantic Coast Collegiate Hockey League, as well as a women's club team in American Collegiate Hockey Association Women's Division 1 and the Eastern Collegiate Women's Hockey League.

=== Roller hockey ===
The PSU Roller Hockey team competes in National Collegiate Roller Hockey Association at the NCRHA Division I level. The team is a Division I member of the Eastern Collegiate Roller Hockey Association (ECRHA). Penn State also fields a team in the B Division of the NCRHA and ECRHA. The PSU B team won the NCRHA B Division Championship in 2010, the university's first national title in roller hockey.

=== Squash ===
Gail Ramsay won the intercollegiate women's squash championship a record four times in 1977, 1978, 1979 and 1980.

=== Swimming and Diving ===
Penn State also fields a competitive club swim and dive team that competes throughout the school year. With a membership of 100+, including all talents from former D1 swimmers to beginners, it is one of the more popular club sports at Penn State. The team finished 4th out of 50+ teams at the 2013 East Coast Collegiate Swim and Dive Club National Championships at Georgia Tech.

=== Men's ultimate ===
Penn State's team, named SPANK, competes in the USA Ultimate College Series at the D-1 level. They are in the Ohio Valley region, and face rival University of Pittsburgh at the regional championship every year. The B-team, Love Tap, also competes at the D-1 level, and serves as a developmental team for SPANK.

=== Men's Water Polo ===
The Men's Club Water Polo team competes in the Mid-Atlantic Division of the Collegiate Water Polo Association and has won nine Mid-Atlantic Division Championships (1998, 2005, 2009, 2012, 2014, 2015, 2016, 2022) to qualify for the National Collegiate Club Championship.

== National championships ==
Penn State claims 84 national team championships all-time, excluding titles from IC4A and AAU competitions and the NCAA emerging sport of women's rugby. 57 of these are NCAA championships, which rank fifth all-time, trailing Stanford, UCLA, USC, and the University of Texas at Austin.

Most of Penn State's women's championships prior to 1982 occurred under the auspices of the Association for Intercollegiate Athletics for Women (AIAW); indeed, four women's teams won national championships in 1980 alone. The NCAA did not start sponsoring women's championships until the 1981–82 academic year. Some of the men's championships occurred prior to the NCAA sponsoring a championship in that sport (for example, the NCAA did not start sponsoring a men's soccer championship until 1959), and some sports have never had recognized NCAA championships (such as Division I FBS football).

=== NCAA team championships ===
Penn State University has won 57 NCAA team national championships.

- Men's (32):
  - Boxing (1): 1932 (unofficial)
  - Cross country (3): 1942, 1947, 1950
  - Gymnastics (12): 1948, 1953, 1954, 1957, 1959, 1960, 1961, 1965, 1976, 2000, 2004, 2007
  - Volleyball (2): 1994, 2008
  - Wrestling (13): 1953, 2011, 2012, 2013, 2014, 2016, 2017, 2018, 2019, 2022, 2023, 2024, 2025, 2026
- Women's (12):
  - Fencing (1): 1983
  - Lacrosse (2): 1987, 1989
  - Soccer (1): 2015
  - Volleyball (8): 1999, 2007, 2008, 2009, 2010, 2013, 2014, 2024
- Co-ed (13)
  - Fencing (13): 1990, 1991, 1995, 1996, 1997, 1998, 1999, 2000, 2002, 2007, 2009, 2010, 2014

=== Other national team championships ===
The Penn State Nittany Lions have won 36 national team titles in current and former NCAA sports that were not bestowed by the NCAA:

- Men's (25):
  - Boxing (4): 1924, 1927, 1929, 1930
  - Cross Country (4): 1926, 1927, 1928, 1930
  - Football (2): 1982, 1986
  - Gymnastics (1): 1944
  - Indoor Track & Field (2): 1942, 1959
  - Soccer (11): 1926, 1929, 1933, 1936, 1937, 1938, 1939, 1940, 1949, 1954, 1955
  - Wrestling (1): 1921
- Women's (11):
  - Bowling (1): 1979
  - Fencing (2): 1980, 1981
  - Field Hockey (2): 1980, 1981
  - Gymnastics (2): 1978, 1980
  - Lacrosse (3): 1978, 1979, 1980
  - Rifle (1): 1947

Additionally, below are 37 national team titles won by Penn State sports club teams (and Athletics Department "Team Sports") at the highest collegiate level in non-NCAA sports:

- Men's (9):
  - Cricket (1): 2025
  - Downriver Canoe/Kayak (2): 2015, 2016
  - Golf croquet (1): 2017
  - Shotokan karate (5) (Kata): 2003, 2004, 2007; (Kumite): 2007, 2013
- Women's (22):
  - Archery (1) (Compound Bow): 2010
  - Equestrian (1) (English): 1989
  - Shotokan karate (3) (Kumite): 2001, 2003, 2007
  - Rugby (12): 1997, 2000, 2004, 2007, 2009, 2010, 2012, 2013, 2014, 2015, 2016, 2017
  - Rugby 7s (4): (CRC) 2013, 2014, 2015; (USA Rugby) 2015
  - Team Handball (1): 2018
- Co-ed (6):
  - Archery (1) (Compound Bow): 2010
  - Cycling (5) (Track): 1987, 1989, 1990, 2004, 2005

== Big Ten championships ==
Since joining the Big Ten in 1991, Penn State has won 125 total championships (93 regular season titles and 32 tournament championships).

=== Big Ten regular season championships ===
- 1992–93 – Women's Volleyball*
- 1993–94 – Women's Basketball*, Field Hockey, Men's Soccer, Women's Volleyball
- 1994–95 – Women's Basketball*, Football
- 1995–96 – Baseball
- 1996–97 – Women's Volleyball*
- 1997–98 – Field Hockey*, Women's Volleyball*
- 1998–99 – Field Hockey, Women's Soccer, Men's Swimming & Diving, Women's Volleyball
- 1999–00 – Women's Basketball, Women's Soccer, Women's Volleyball
- 2000–01 – Women's Soccer
- 2001–02 – Women's Soccer, Women's Swimming & Diving
- 2002–03 – Women's Basketball, Men's Gymnastics, Men's Soccer, Women's Soccer
- 2003–04 – Women's Basketball, Women's Soccer, Women's Indoor Track & Field, Women's Volleyball
- 2004–05 – Women's Soccer, Women's Swimming & Diving, Women's Volleyball
- 2005–06 – Field Hockey, Football*, Men's Soccer, Women's Soccer, Women's Swimming & Diving, Women's Volleyball
- 2006–07 – Women's Soccer, Women's Volleyball
- 2007–08 – Men's Gymnastics, Women's Soccer, Women's Outdoor Track & Field, Women's Volleyball
- 2008–09 – Field Hockey, Football*, Women's Soccer, Women's Outdoor Track & Field, Women's Volleyball
- 2009–10 – Women's Cross Country, Women's Soccer, Women's Indoor Track & Field, Women's Outdoor Track & Field, Women's Volleyball
- 2010–11 – Women's Soccer*, Women's Volleyball
- 2011–12 – Women's Basketball, Women's Soccer, Wrestling
- 2012–13 – Women's Basketball, Field Hockey, Men's Soccer*, Women's Soccer, Women's Volleyball
- 2013–14 – Women's Basketball*, Field Hockey*, Men's Soccer, Women's Indoor Track & Field, Women's Outdoor Track & Field, Women's Volleyball, Wrestling*
- 2014–15 – Men's Gymnastics, Women's Soccer
- 2015–16 – Women's Cross Country, Women's Soccer*, Wrestling*
- 2016–17 – Football, Women's Soccer*, Wrestling, Women's Indoor Track & Field, Men's Outdoor Track & Field
- 2017–18 – Women's Volleyball*, Wrestling
- 2018–19 – Women's Soccer, Wrestling*, Men's Lacrosse
- 2019–20 – Men's Ice Hockey
- 2020–21 – Wrestling*, Women's Soccer
- 2021–22 – Men's Soccer, Wrestling
- 2022–23 – Field Hockey*, Wrestling
- 2024–25 – Women's Volleyball*, Wrestling, Men's Gymnastics*

* denotes shared regular season conference title

=== Big Ten tournament championships ===
- 1994–95 – Women's Basketball
- 1995–96 – Field Hockey, Women's Basketball
- 1996–97 – Field Hockey
- 1997–98 – Field Hockey
- 1998–99 – Field Hockey, Women's Soccer
- 2000–01 – Women's Soccer
- 2001–02 – Women's Soccer
- 2002–03 – Men's Soccer
- 2005–06 – Men's Soccer
- 2006–07 – Women's Soccer
- 2008–09 – Women's Soccer
- 2010–11 – Wrestling
- 2011–12 – Field Hockey, Wrestling
- 2012–13 – Field Hockey, Wrestling
- 2013–14 – Wrestling
- 2014–15 – Women's Lacrosse
- 2015–16 – Women's Soccer, Wrestling
- 2016–17 – Field Hockey, Men's Ice Hockey
- 2017–18 – Women's Soccer
- 2018–19 – Wrestling, Men's Gymnastics, Men's Lacrosse
- 2019–20 – Women's Soccer
- 2021–22 – Men's Soccer
- 2022–23 – Women's Soccer, Wrestling
- 2023-24 - Wrestling
- 2024-25 - Wrestling

== Atlantic 10 championships ==
During Penn State's years of membership in the Atlantic 10 Conference (1982–91) and earlier when it was known as the Eastern 8 Conference (1976–79), Penn State won 70 total championships.

=== Atlantic 10 championships (37) ===
- 1976–77 – Men's Basketball (West)*
- 1978–79 – Men's Cross Country
- 1982–83 – Men's Cross Country, Baseball (West)
- 1983–84 – Men's Golf, Men's Swimming & Diving
- 1984–85 – Women's Basketball*, Women's Volleyball, Men's Swimming & Diving
- 1985–86 – Women's Basketball*, Women's Volleyball, Men's Swimming & Diving
- 1986–87 – Women's Volleyball, Men's Cross Country, Men's Swimming & Diving, Men's Golf
- 1987–88 – Women's Volleyball, Men's Cross Country, Men's Golf
- 1988–89 – Women's Volleyball, Field Hockey (West), Men's Cross Country, Men's Soccer (West), Men's Golf
- 1989–90 – Women's Volleyball, Field Hockey, Men's Cross Country, Men's Soccer (West), Women's Cross Country, Men's Golf
- 1990–91 – Women's Basketball, Women's Volleyball, Field Hockey, Men's Cross Country, Women's Cross Country, Baseball (West), Men's Golf

* denotes shared regular season conference/division title

=== Atlantic 10 Tournament championships (33) ===
- 1978–79 – Men's Tennis
- 1982–83 – Women's Basketball, Softball, Women's Tennis
- 1983–84 – Women's Basketball, Women's Volleyball
- 1984–85 – Women's Basketball, Women's Volleyball, Softball, Women's Tennis
- 1985–86 – Women's Basketball, Women's Volleyball, Men's Tennis, Women's Tennis
- 1986–87 – Women's Volleyball, Women's Tennis
- 1987–88 – Women's Volleyball, Men's Soccer, Softball, Women's Tennis
- 1988–89 – Women's Volleyball, Men's Soccer, Women's Tennis
- 1989–90 – Women's Basketball, Women's Volleyball, Men's Soccer, Field Hockey, Women's Tennis
- 1990–91 – Women's Basketball, Men's Basketball, Women's Volleyball, Field Hockey, Women's Tennis

== Other conference championships ==
Of Penn State's 29 varsity athletic programs, several programs are not sponsored by the Big Ten and have competed in other conferences, now and in the past.

Men's Volleyball

- EIVA: 1972, 1976, 1981, 1982, 1983, 1986, 1987, 1989, 1991, 1992, 1993, 1994, 1995, 1996, 1997, 1999, 2000, 2001, 2002, 2003, 2004, 2005, 2006, 2007, 2008, 2009, 2010, 2011, 2012, 2013, 2014, 2015, 2017, 2021, 2023, 2024

Women's Ice Hockey

- College Hockey America: 2021 (regular season), 2023 (rs & tournament), 2024 (rs & tournament), 2025 (rs & tournament)

Wrestling

- Eastern Wrestling League (member 1975–1992)

Team Dual Meet Champions:1976, 1977, 1978, 1982, 1983, 1984, 1985, 1986* (tie), 1987, 1988, 1989, 1992
Tournament Champions: 1976, 1977, 1978, 1982, 1983, 1984, 1985, 1986, 1987, 1988, 1989, 1990, 1991, 1992

== Olympians ==
Athletes (129) and coaches/faculty members (12) from Penn State have won 17 gold medals, 15 silver medals, and 28 bronze medals. The University had its most representatives participating in the 2016 Rio de Janeiro Olympic Games with 21 participants earning eight medals, also the most ever.

Five former Penn State student-athletes earned medals in the 2012 London Olympic Games. Women's volleyball stars Megan Hodge and Christa Harmotto earned silver medals after falling to Brazil in the gold-medal match. Additionally, women's soccer players Erin McLeod and Carmelina Moscato came home with bronze medals playing for the Canada women's national soccer team. Finally, Natalie Dell earned Penn State's first rowing medal with her bronze-medal performance in the women's quadruple sculls. Penn State sent 19 participants to the 2012 Summer Games, a school record at the time.

== Facilities ==
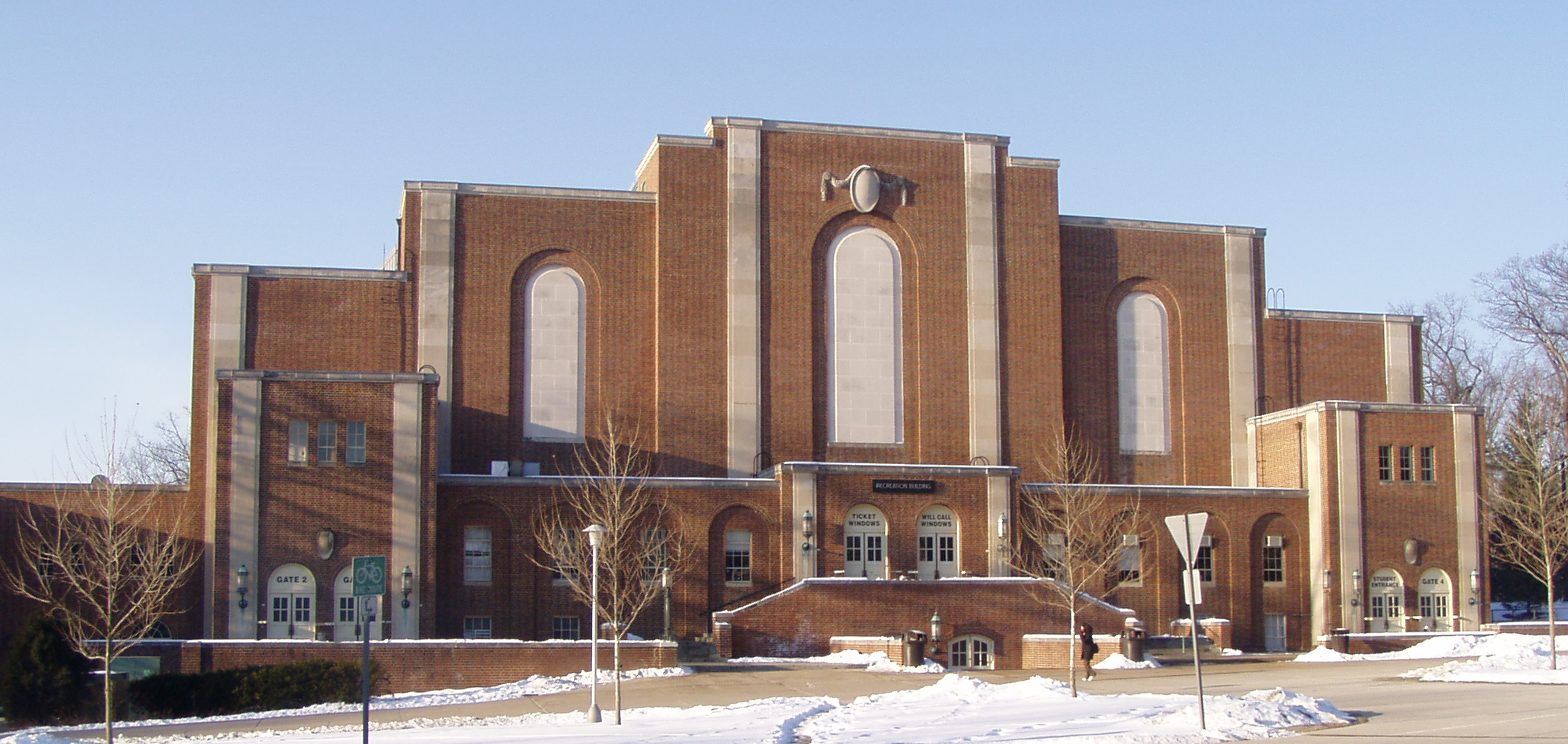
Rec Hall

The football team plays in Beaver Stadium. The men's and women's basketball teams play in the Bryce Jordan Center. Most of the other indoor teams play at Rec Hall, which was previously the long term home for the basketball teams as well. The school also is home to the Ashenfelter Multi-Sport Facility for indoor track. Other indoor facilities include Lasch Building & Holuba Hall for football; White Building houses gymnastics & fencing; and the Lorenzo Wrestling Complex is within Rec Hall.

A new baseball stadium named Medlar Field at Lubrano Park opened in June 2006. The stadium is host to both the University baseball team as well as the State College Spikes, a minor league baseball team. The ballpark is oriented towards the east, offering a view of Mount Nittany. The softball team plays at its new home, the Nittany Lion Softball Park, which opened in 2011. Jeffrey Field is home to the soccer program. The lacrosse teams play at the Penn State Lacrosse Field which opened in 2012 next to the Ashenfelter Multi-Sport Facility. The hockey teams both play at the Pegula Ice Arena. The field hockey team plays at the Penn State Field Hockey Complex which is located adjacent to Bigler Field, and opened in 2005.

Additionally, the university operates the Penn State Golf Courses, two courses for the golf teams, students, faculty, and the general public. The Intercollegiate Athletics Department operates the Stone Valley Recreation Area, approximately twenty miles southeast of State College.

== Penn State All-Sports Museum ==
The Penn State All-Sports Museum, a museum honoring all Penn State Nittany Lion athletes, is located near Gate B of Beaver Stadium. The upper level of the museum is dedicated to Penn State basketball and other indoor sports, while the lower level of the museum is dedicated to outdoor sports.

The football exhibit on the lower level features the Heisman Trophy won by John Cappelletti and a collection of several other trophies and awards, in addition to honoring the Penn State football team, the Penn State Blue Band, Penn State Cheerleading, and the student athletes who have portrayed the Nittany Lion mascot. The museum opened in February 2002.

== See also ==
- List of college athletic programs in Pennsylvania
- Lacrosse in Pennsylvania
