= Ernie McCoy (athletic director) =

American basketball player, coach, and athletic director

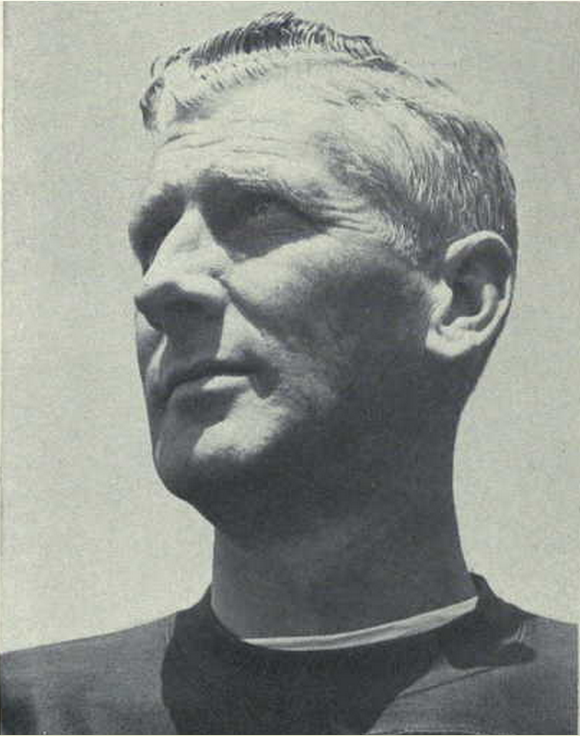
- McCoy as Michigan basketball coach, c. 1949

Biographical details
- Born: July 20, 1904; Pittsburgh, Pennsylvania, U.S.
- Died: September 16, 1980 (aged 76); University Park, Pennsylvania, U.S.

Playing career

Basketball
- 1927–1929: Michigan
- Positions: Guard, center

Coaching career (HC unless noted)

Football
- 1932–1933: Montclair State
- 1940–1942: Michigan (assistant)
- 1945–1951: Michigan (assistant)

Basketball
- 1932–1934: Montclair State
- 1947–1948: Michigan (assistant)
- 1948–1952: Michigan

Baseball
- 1933–1934: Montclair State

Administrative career (AD unless noted)
- 1932–1934: Montclair State
- 1946–1952: Michigan (assistant AD)
- 1952–1970: Penn State
- 1971–1973: Miami (FL)

Head coaching record
- Overall: 1–8–2 (football); 56–65–1 (basketball); 3–11 (baseball)

Ernest B. McCoy (July 20, 1904 – September 16, 1980) was an All-American basketball player at the University of Michigan from 1927 to 1929. After graduating, he spent his entire professional career in college athletics, serving as the athletic director at Penn State (1952–1970), the athletic director at the University of Miami (1971–1973), and a basketball coach (1949–1952), assistant football coach, and assistant athletic director (1946–1952) at Michigan. He is most remembered as the athletic director who hired Joe Paterno as head football coach at Penn State in 1966.

== Athlete at University of Michigan ==
Though born in Pittsburgh, Pennsylvania, McCoy was raised in Detroit, Michigan. He attended Detroit's Northwestern High School and was the first Detroit public school student who went on to be named a college basketball All-American. He played three years as a varsity basketball player at Michigan from 1927 to 1929. As a sophomore in 1927, McCoy scored 80 points and played on a 14–3 Big Ten Conference championship team along with Bennie Oosterbaan (130 points) and Edward Harrigan (153 points). The 1928 team finished in fifth place but has the distinction of having three of the five starters (McCoy, Oosterbaan, and Bill Orwig) having gone on to be successful coaches and athletic directors at major college programs. McCoy was named captain of Michigan's 1929 basketball team, and as captain he and Bill Orwig led the Wolverines to the school's fourth Big Ten basketball championship. McCoy was also named Michigan's third All-American in basketball. Known more for his defense and playmaking, McCoy scored 208 points in three seasons of varsity basketball. He also earned two varsity letters in baseball and was awarded the Western Conference Medal of Honor for scholarship and athletics in 1929.

== Montclair ==
McCoy completed a master's degree in physical education at Columbia University, and worked as coach, teacher and athletic director at a high school in Montclair, New Jersey for eight years. He later became athletic director at Montclair Teachers College, a position he held for three years. In addition, McCoy served as Montclair's third all-time head football coach.

== Coach and assistant athletic director at Michigan ==
In 1940, Fritz Crisler described McCoy as "a Michigan man" and lured him back to Ann Arbor as an assistant football coach and freshman baseball coach. During World War II, McCoy took a leave from Michigan to serve in the United States Navy. In 1946, Crisler named McCoy as the school's assistant athletic director. He was an assistant basketball coach in 1947–48 and took over as head coach for the 1948–49 season. In his first season as the Wolverines' basketball coach, the team went 15-6 and finished third in the Big Ten as Pete Elliott and Bob Harrison were both selected as All-Big Ten players. In 1950, the team dropped to 11–11 and followed with successive 7–15 finishes in 1951 and 1952. Overall, McCoy had a 40–47 record (18–34 in conference) in four years as Michigan's head basketball coach.

During his time at Michigan, McCoy was an advocate for intercollegiate athletics but also for maintaining a balance between athletics and academics. In a 1950 speech, McCoy noted that athletics "are definitely part of our educational system -- it builds character, fortitude, the will to win and to keep your chin up when you lose." However, he also warned against the constant demands of fans and alumni to win at all costs: "The constant demand from the alumnus for a winning team may ruin athletics...If a coaching staff fulfills its duties in the class room and can develop high ideals of character in athletes, then the administrators are wrong in firing the coach." In 1952, a senior U-M physical education professor said of McCoy: "He has a broad viewpoint on the relationships between the intercollegiate athletic department and the University's physical education department. His ability to combine all the virtues of an academic dean with the attributes of an intercollegiate athletic director is outstanding."

== Penn State ==
In 1952, he accepted the job as athletic director at Penn State. During his 18 years at Penn State, McCoy also served as Dean of the College of Health, Physical Education and Recreation. He shepherded the redesignation of the college in 1963, changing its name from the College of Physical Education and Athletics. It was McCoy who brought to realization Penn State's 700-acre (2.8 km^{2}) Stone Valley Recreation Area as a recreation center for students and faculty, but also as a training ground for students in the recreation and parks program, and as a demonstration project for the entire state in outdoor education. McCoy also had the foresight to anticipate the importance of science and medicine in athletics, directing the college into research in the field of athletics, biomechanics and human performance labs. In 1969, McCoy pioneered the Sports Research Institute at Penn State, which has contributed to safer practices in all aspects of athletics and to research in the fields of sports physiology, biomechanics, and sports medicine. He oversaw an era of tremendous growth and revitalization and led the development of a new ice skating rink, new bowling alleys and a wide variety of recreational facilities. In the late 1960s, he also led the campaign for a new football stadium, new tennis courts and an enlarged gymnasium and recreational facilities. During his years at Penn State, McCoy also occupied positions on the NCAA committee on injuries and safety, and later on the highly coveted NCAA Executive Committee and Council, its policy-making body, and also served as vice-president and secretary-treasurer of the NCAA. He was also a past president of the Eastern College Athletic Conference.

When Penn State finished with a 5–5 record in 1965, Rip Engle stepped down after 16 years as head coach. It was McCoy's job to find a replacement. In February 1966, McCoy chose Engle's assistant, Joe Paterno, who remained the Nittany Lions head coach until 2011. Paterno recalled the hiring process this way: "The guy who was the athletic director, Ernie McCoy, the dean of the college of phys ed, called me into his office. He said, 'Do you want the job?' I said, 'Yeah.' He said, 'Okay.' We shook hands, and he said, 'You get 20,000 bucks a year." Paterno went on to win over 400 games and two national championships as Penn State's head coach.

When the Nittany Lions traveled to Pasadena in 1966 to play the UCLA Bruins, McCoy met with the local press. While acknowledging that Penn State was rebuilding, he guaranteed that the team would make Pennsylvanians proud: "We may not be big enough, or strong enough, and we may not have enough experience for UCLA. But the folks back in Pennsylvania are going to be proud of our team. They'll be in there trying all the way." McCoy did play a key role in building a program that made the State of Pennsylvania proud. In an interview in 2007, Paterno credited McCoy as "the guy who really turned this whole athletic program around."

In June 1970, McCoy announced his retirement after 18 years at Penn State. The Daily News in Huntingdon, Pennsylvania reported at the time: "Trying to separate Ernie McCoy from athletics is like trying to separate an Englishman from his tea -- it's next to impossible."

== University of Miami ==
McCoy came out of retirement in February 1971 when the University of Miami asked him to serve temporarily as athletic director until order was restored following the resignation of Charlie Tate. In November 1971, McCoy hired Pete Elliott to become his successor as Miami's athletic director starting in 1972. Those plans went awry when Miami football coach Fran Curci resigned in December 1971 to take a job at Kentucky. McCoy asked Elliott to take over as head coach on an interim basis. McCoy agreed to remain the athletic director for another year so Elliott could focus on the football team and then take over as athletic director once the football program was settled. McCoy noted, "We're protecting the title of director of athletics for him because that's the job he came here for. He agreed to take the coaching job in a dire emergency." McCoy had coached Elliott in both basketball and football at the University of Michigan in the late 1940s. The 1972 football season did not turn out well for Miami, as the Hurricanes drew only 22,000 fans a game. McCoy also became embroiled in a controversy with administrators at Tulane University in October 1972. After an official lost track and granted the Hurricanes an illegal "fifth down", Miami scored the winning touchdown with one minute left in a game against Tulane. The touchdown broke an eight-game Miami losing streak, and Tulane administrators and New Orleans sports writers bitterly attacked McCoy for poor sportsmanship when he declined to forfeit the game as a result of the game-changing error. McCoy defended his decision, noting that he had consulted with several national football authorities, who had advised him that NCAA rules discouraged forfeitures in order to avoid creating a precedent for appellate decisions on games changed by allegedly improper officiating decisions. McCoy finally retired as Miami's athletic director in November 1973, leaving Elliott as his successor. At the time, McCoy said, "This is it for me. I'm going to retire and go back to Pennsylvania and leave it to Pete and his staff."

== Family, awards and honors ==
McCoy was married to a fellow University of Michigan alumnus, and their son also attended Michigan. As a result of his nearly fifty years in collegiate athletics, McCoy has received numerous awards and honors, including the following:

- In 1973, McCoy received the James J. Corbett Memorial Award from the National Association of Collegiate Directors of Athletics, which is presented annually to the collegiate administrator who "through the years has most typified Corbett’s devotion to intercollegiate athletics and worked unceasingly for its betterment."
- In 1977, McCoy was inducted into the Pennsylvania Sports Hall of Fame in Williamsport, Pennsylvania.
- In 1986, he was posthumously inducted into the University of Michigan Athletic Hall of Honor.
- The McCoy Natatorium at Penn State is named after McCoy.

== Head coaching record ==
=== Football ===
| Year | Team | Overall | Conference | Standing | Bowl/playoffs |
|---|---|---|---|---|---|
Montclair State Indians (Independent) (1932–1933)
| 1932 | Montclair State | 0–3–1 | | | |
| 1933 | Montclair State | 1–5–1 | | | |
| Montclair State: | | 1–8–2 | | | |
| Total: | | 1–8–2 | | | |

== See also ==
- University of Michigan Athletic Hall of Honor
