= W. E. Clyde Todd =

American ornithologist

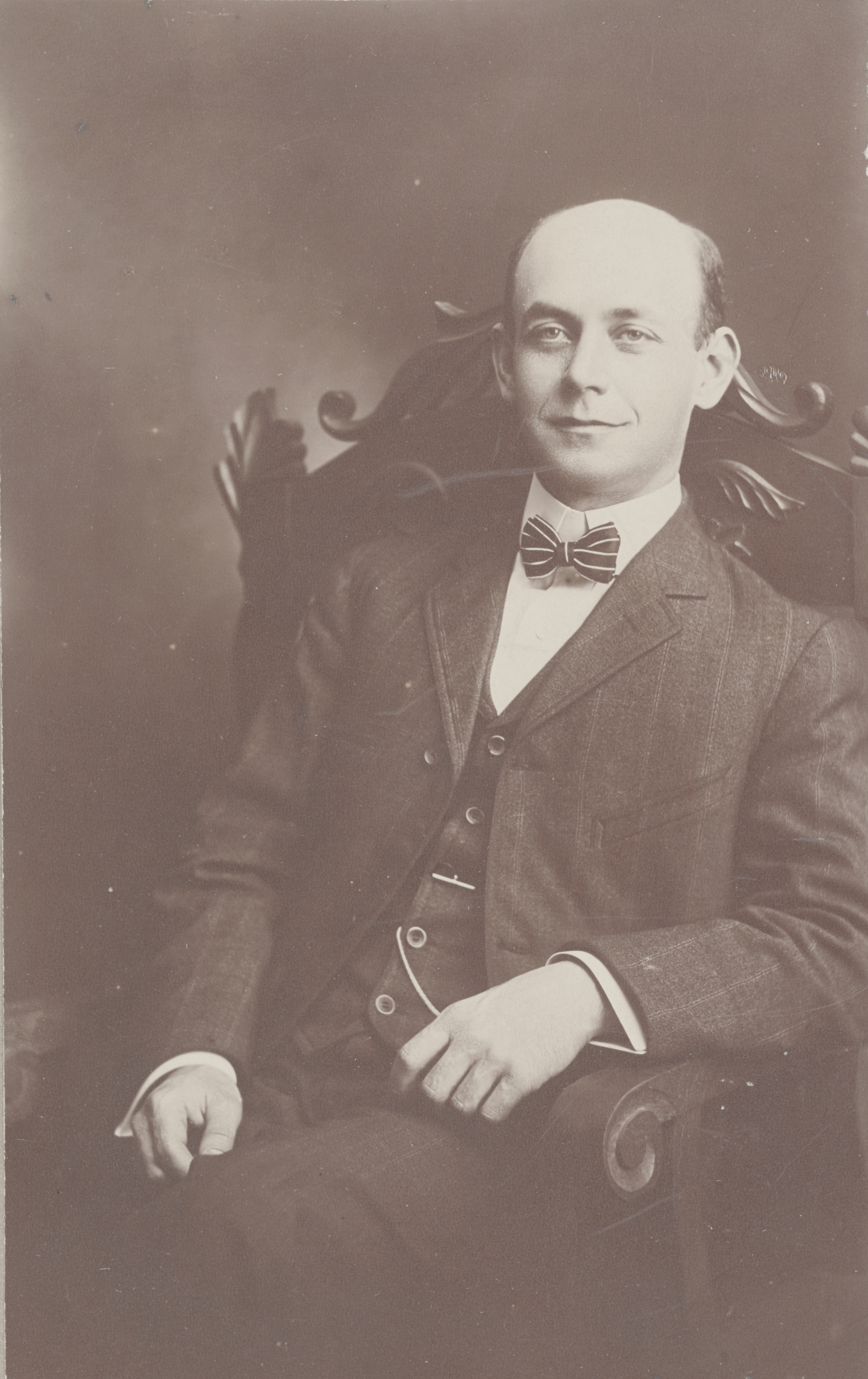
c. 1928

Walter Edmond Clyde Todd (Smithfield, Ohio, September 6, 1874 – June 25, 1969) was an American ornithologist who worked at the Carnegie Museum in Pittsburgh, Pennsylvania. He collected specimens mainly in the Arctic zone and was the author of several books.

== Biography ==
Walter Edmond Clyde Todd was born on September 6, 1874, at Smithfield, Ohio and was the eldest of the three children of William and Isabel Todd. His father was a school teacher.

In 1891 Todd abandoned his studies at Geneva College to take up a post as messenger with Clinton Hart Merriam at the United States Department of Agriculture, where his first job was the sorting and cataloging of a collection of bird stomachs preserved in alcohol. In Washington he met many leading scientists including Robert Ridgway, whom he took as a role model.

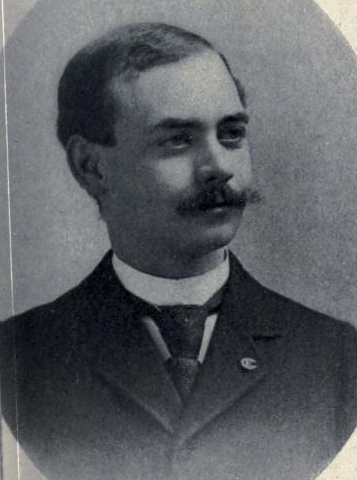
Portrait c. 1903

Discontented with government work, in 1898 Todd contracted with the fledgling Carnegie Museum to collect bird specimens in western Pennsylvania. He soon joined the museum as Assistant, and remained there the rest of his working life, which was much prolonged beyond any normal retirement age. He continued with field work on Pennsylvania, and later in north-eastern Canada, and would later produce two major works, Birds of Western Pennsylvania (1940) and Birds of the Labrador peninsula and adjacent areas (1963); along with many descriptions of new taxa and systematic studies based on the museum's growing collection of neotropical birds. Todd's specialty was the Arctic – he participated in over twenty expeditions before producing Birds of the Labrador Peninsula. He chose the Arctic as his specialty because of a bout of malaria he contracted while working in Washington, DC, which prevented him from working in tropical climates. Despite his inability to do fieldwork in Central and South America, his first book which was coauthored with Melbourne Carriker was called The Birds of Santa Marta and focused on a particular region of Colombia. Todd's research was based entirely on the collections of bird skins he had amassed at the Carnegie Museum. He was awarded a Brewster Medal in 1925.

A long-time Fellow of the American Ornithologists' Union, he was elected Fellow Emeritus in 1968. He was also noted for his local initiatives in conservation and philanthropy. In his book Birds of Western Pennsylvania (1940) and his pamphlet (published posthumously) Birds of the Buffalo Creek Region, he displays both his love of Western Pennsylvania ecology and a prescience about such topics as urban sprawl, global warming, and habitat fragmentation. He was also a vocal critic of private collections and of museums that amassed multiple versions of the same bird or bird's eggs, denouncing such practices as wasteful and not contributing to the study of birds. Although he married, he became a widower early in life and did not have any children. As a result, he devoted a substantial amount of personal resources to conservation of the area where he had spent much of his childhood, Buffalo Township (in Butler County). In 1942, he purchased seventy-one acres on the site of his grandfather's farm, where he had made his first significant ornithological discovery. The land would otherwise have been logged; he rescued it via his purchase and donated it to the Audubon Society of Western Pennsylvania (ASWP) with the suggestion that it be turned into a nature reserve. The society honored his wishes, and in 1956 he donated an additional sixty-one acres south of his initial donation. ASWP has continued to add to the nature reserve and as of 2009 it stood at 224 acres (0.91 km^{2}). Todd Nature Reserve, located off Route 28 and Highway 356 in Butler County, is named for W.E. Clyde Todd and is open to the public dawn to dusk throughout the year (with the exception of hunting season in November–December).

The ASWP annually awards the W.E. Clyde Todd Award to recognize "an individual who has made an outstanding contribution to conservation in western Pennsylvania."
