= Todd Nature Reserve =

Protected area in western Pennsylvania, USA

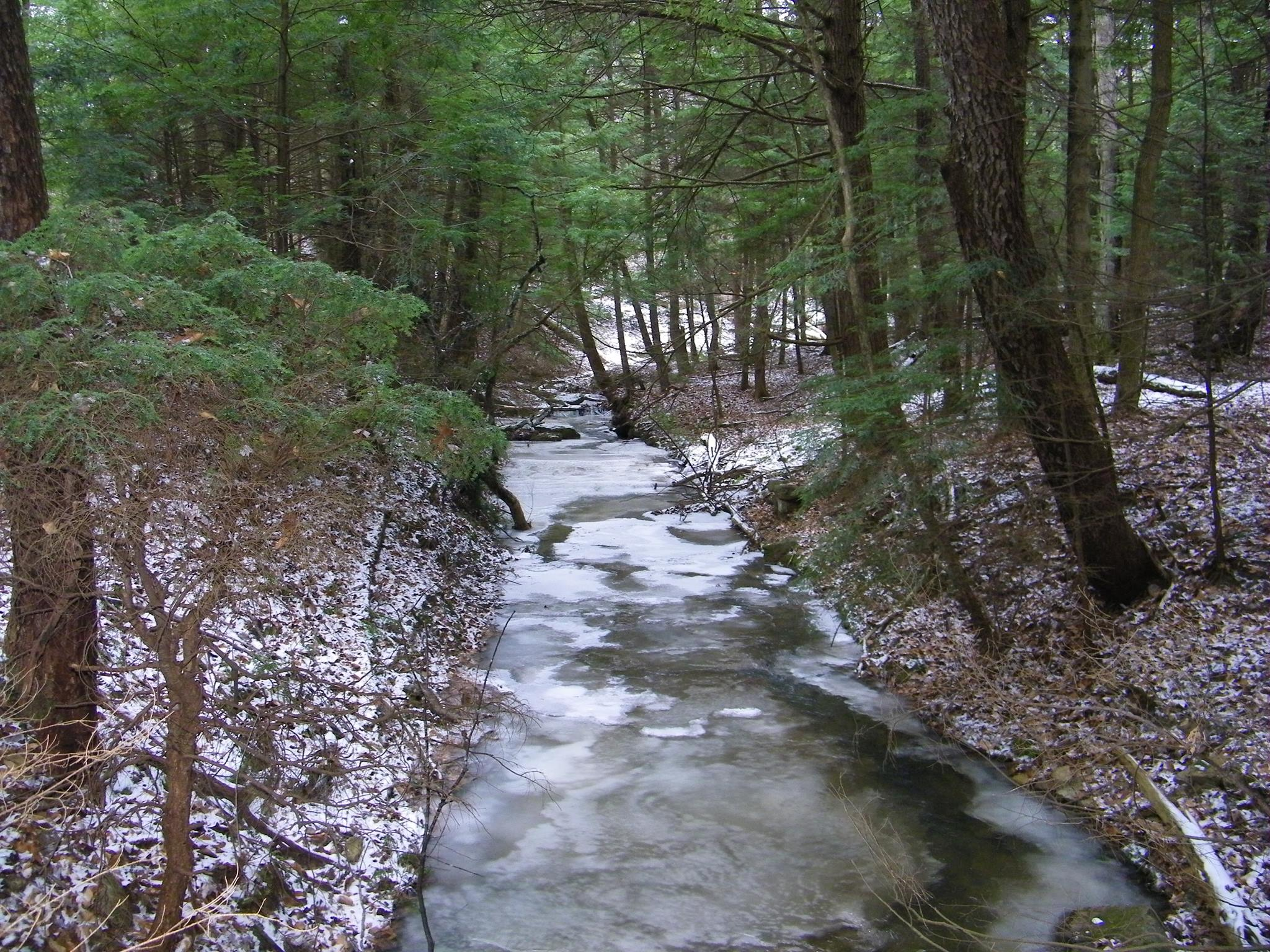

- Location within Pennsylvania
- Location: Buffalo Township, Butler County, Pennsylvania
- Nearest city: Freeport
- Coordinates: 40.7297°N 79.7008°W
- Governing body: Audubon Society of Western Pennsylvania
- Website: www.aswp.org/locations/todd/index.html

Todd Nature Reserve (formerly called Todd Sanctuary) is a 334-acre (135 ha) nature reserve owned and operated by the Audubon Society of Western Pennsylvania. It is located in Buffalo Township, Butler County, Pennsylvania; approximately thirty miles northeast of Pittsburgh, and five miles (8 km) north of Freeport. The original portion of the reserve was donated by noted ornithologist W.E. Clyde Todd, who made his first significant birding discoveries on the land while visiting his grandfather at the end of the nineteenth century. Todd went on to become the Curator of Birds at the Carnegie Museum, where he remained for most of his adult life.

The nature reserve began in 1942 with Todd's donation and has since been expanded. The most recent expansion included purchase of 42 acres (17 ha) which is planned to contain a trail named after the previous landowners. Todd Nature Reserve is the oldest in Western Pennsylvania, and one of the oldest reserves in the state.

Over 180 species of birds have been found on the site, which provides important habitat for the pileated woodpecker, scarlet tanager, and Kentucky warbler. It has been featured in American Birds magazine (now North American Birds) as the location of several breeding bird censuses in the 1970s, and was the subject of peer-reviewed research on the effect of trails on bird breeding habits in 2000–01.

Today, there are 5 miles (8.0 km) of trails, three streams (Watson's, Nixon's, and Hesselgesser Runs), and a man-made pond. The 1-mile (1.6 km) Loop Trail runs around the circumference of the reserve with shorter trails bisecting it. The Ravine Trail is the most difficult trail on the reserve, and includes several small stream crossings.
