= University Hockey League =

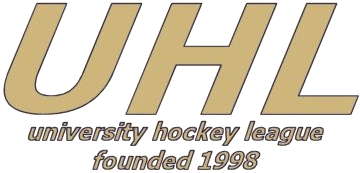
- Conference: American Collegiate Hockey Association
- Founded: 1998
- Folded: 2006
- Commissioner: Bill Shaflucas
- Sports fielded: Men's ice hockey
- Division: Division II
- Headquarters: Morgantown, West Virginia

Locations

University Hockey League (UHL) was an American Collegiate Hockey Association (ACHA) Division II club level hockey-only college athletic conference with teams in Ohio, Pennsylvania, West Virginia, Maryland, Virginia, and North Carolina. It was founded in 1998 by University of Pittsburgh, Penn State University, Indiana University of Pennsylvania (IUP), and West Virginia University.

University of Findlay was a member from the 1999-00 through the 2000-01 seasons. Robert Morris University was a member during 2001-02. University of Maryland joined in 2002. Liberty University joined the UHL in September 2003. North Carolina State joined in June 2004. Penn State left following the 2003-04 season. West Virginia University (WVU) was a member from the 1998-99 to the 1999-2000 season, and rejoined for the 2002-03 season. In 2005, WVU was expelled from the UHL in because of a "lack of compliance with ACHA policies, specifically those regarding academic verification for players and USA Hockey insurance forms."

Upon the dissolution of the UHL in 2006, Indiana (Pa.), Pitt, and West Virginia moved to the Division I level and founded the College Hockey Mid-America conference. Maryland also moved to the Division I level and joined the Eastern Collegiate Hockey Association before returning to Division II in 2010. Staying at the Division II level, North Carolina State moved to the Atlantic Coast Collegiate Hockey League, while Liberty began competing independently.

== Membership timeline ==
Season	Teams
1997-98	IUP, Penn State, Pittsburgh, West Virginia
1998-99	IUP, Penn State, Pittsburgh, West Virginia
1999-2000	Findlay, IUP, Penn State, Pittsburgh, West Virginia
2000-01	Findlay, IUP, Penn State, Pittsburgh
2001-02	IUP, Penn State, Pittsburgh, Robert Morris
2002-03	IUP, Maryland, Penn State, Pittsburgh, West Virginia
2003-04	IUP, Liberty, Maryland, Penn State, Pittsburgh, West Virginia
2004-05	IUP, Liberty, Maryland, North Carolina State, Pittsburgh, West Virginia
2005-06	IUP, Liberty, Maryland, North Carolina State, Pittsburgh, West Virginia

== Past champions ==
	Champion	Runner-up
2005-06	Liberty	IUP
2004-05	Liberty	IUP
2003-04	Penn State	IUP
2002-03	IUP	Penn State
2001-02	Penn State	IUP
2000-01	IUP	Penn State
1999-00	University of Findlay	IUP
1998-99	IUP	Penn State
1997-98	Penn State	West Virginia University

== See also ==
Media related to University Hockey League at Wikimedia Commons

- American Collegiate Hockey Association
- List of ice hockey leagues
