= Eastern States Collegiate Hockey League =

Collegiate hockey conference

- Conference: ACHA
- Founded: 2007
- Folded: 2025
- Commissioner: Dom Bellizzie
- Sports fielded: Men's ice hockey
- Division: Division I
- No. of teams: 6
- Headquarters: West Bloomfield, Michigan
- Region: Northeast
- Last champions: Delaware Blue Hens (1st title)
- Most titles: Stony Brook Seawolves (5 titles)
- Website: Official website

Locations
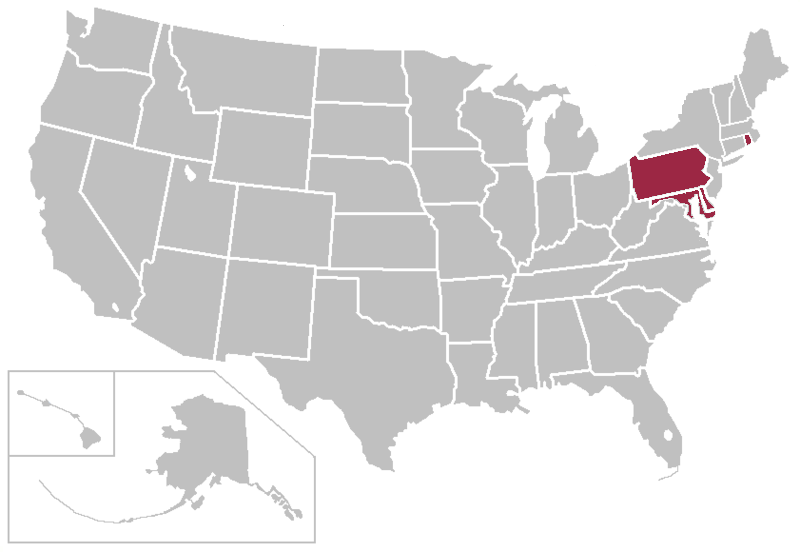

The Eastern States Collegiate Hockey League (ESCHL) was a collegiate hockey conference at the American Collegiate Hockey Association (ACHA) Division I level. The league was created in 2017 and is made up of eight teams located in the Northeast and Mid-Atlantic regions of the United States.

During the 2024–25 season, Delaware, Stony Brook, Syracuse, and Pittsburgh announced they would be leaving the ESCHL for the newly formed ACCHL Men's Division 1 subsection. This left only Drexel and Rhode Island. With the conference no longer having a sufficient number of teams for a meaningful in-conference season, both Drexel and Rhode Island departed for the ECHA in the summer of 2025.

== Format ==
League teams play a 20-game league schedule consisting of 2 games against each of the other league teams. League playoffs are held in February with the top 4 teams qualifying for the playoffs. ESCHL Champions receive an automatic bid to the ACHA Men's Division I National Tournament.

== History ==
Penn State University won the first two playoff championships over the University of Delaware in both 2008 and 2009. The regular season title was shared by Penn State, Delaware, and the University of Rhode Island in the 2008–2009 with each team finishing with 25 points in the standings. Navy and Drexel left the conference to join the Eastern Collegiate Hockey Association and Robert Morris University joined the conference beginning in the 2010–11 season. In September 2010, prior to the start of the 2010–11 season, Penn State left the conference in 2011 during the program's transition to NCAA Division I. Robert Morris left the league to join College Hockey Mid-America(CHMA) but was replaced by Rutgers in the 2012–13 season. Rutgers left for NECHL in 2018. Drexel joined the league from ECHA before the 2020–2021 season. Niagara & Pitt joined the conference from the NECHL and CHMA for the 2022–23 season.

== Membership ==
School	Location	Founded	Affiliation	Enrollment	Nickname	Primary conference
Drexel University	Philadelphia, PA	1891	Private	25,595	Dragons	CAA D-I
University of Delaware	Newark, DE	1743	Public	19,067	Fightin' Blue Hens	CAA (D-I)
University of Pittsburgh	Pittsburgh, PA	1787	State-related	50,027	Panthers	ACC (D-I)
University of Rhode Island	Kingston, RI	1892	Public	19,095	Rams	A-10 (D-I)
Stony Brook University	Stony Brook, NY	1957	Public	26,782	Seawolves	CAA (D-I)
Syracuse University	Syracuse, NY	1870	Private	21,267	Orange	ACC (D-I)

== Previous members ==
- Navy - 2007–2010, now in ECHA
- Scranton - 2007–2008, now in ACHA Men's Division II, CSCHC
- Penn State - 2007–2011, now NCAA Division I
- Robert Morris - 2010–2012, now in CHMA
- Rutgers - 2012–2018, now in NECHL
- Liberty - now ACHA Division I Independent
- NYU - now in ECHA
- Niagara - now ACHA Division I Independent

== Conference arenas ==
School	Hockey Arena	Location	Capacity
Delaware	Fred Rust Ice Arena	Newark, DE	2,500
Drexel	Class of 1923 Arena	Philadelphia, PA	2,500
Pitt	Alpha Ice Complex	Pittsburgh, PA	1,200
Rhode Island	Bradford R. Boss Arena	Kingston, RI	2,500
Stony Brook	The Rinx	Hauppauge, NY	1,000
Syracuse	Tennity Ice Skating Pavilion	Syracuse, NY	350

== List of Championship Games ==
Year	Winner	Score	Runner-up	Arena	City
2008	Penn State	8–3	Delaware	McMullen Hockey Arena	Annapolis, Md.
2009	Penn State	4–1	Delaware	Penn State Ice Pavilion	University Park, Pa.
2010	Penn State	7–5	Rhode Island	Fred Rust Ice Arena	Newark, Del.
2011	Rhode Island	5–4	Delaware	Bradford R. Boss Ice Arena	Kingston, R.I.
2012	Rhode Island	4–3	Stony Brook	Ice Line Quad Rinks	West Chester, Pa.
2013	Stony Brook	3–2	Delaware	Fred Rust Ice Arena	Newark, Del.
2014	Stony Brook	5–4	Delaware	The Rinx	Hauppauge, N.Y.
2015	Stony Brook	5–4 (OT)	Delaware	Middletown Sports Complex	Middletown, New N.J.
2016	Stony Brook	4–1	Lebanon Valley	Hersheypark Arena	Hershey, Pa.
2017	Liberty	6–1	Stony Brook	Bradford R. Boss Ice Arena	Kingston, R.I.
2018	Liberty	2–1	Stony Brook	Ice Line Quad Rinks	West Chester, Pa.
2019	Syracuse	3–2 (2OT)	Liberty	Ice Line Quad Rinks	West Chester, Pa.
2020	Liberty	4–0	Stony Brook	Ice Line Quad Rinks	West Chester, Pa.
2022	Stony Brook	4–2	Delaware	Ice Line Quad Rinks	West Chester, Pa.
2023	Pittsburgh	8–2	Niagara	Revolution Ice Center	Scranton, Pa.
2024	Drexel	4–2	Rhode Island	Revolution Ice Center	Scranton, Pa.
2025	Delaware	5–4 (OT)	Syracuse	Revolution Ice Center	Scranton, Pa.

== See also ==
- American Collegiate Hockey Association
- List of ice hockey leagues
