= Morgantown Municipal Ice Arena =

Coordinates: 39.610465°N 79.958303°W

- Morgantown Ice Arena
- Interactive map of Morgantown Municipal Ice Arena
- Location: Morgantown, West Virginia, United States
- Owner: Morgantown Parks and Recreation
- Capacity: 500 (hockey)
- Surface: 200' x 85'(hockey)

Tenant
- West Virginia Mountaineers (ACHA)

The Morgantown Municipal Ice Arena or Morgantown Ice Arena is a 400-seat multi purpose arena located in White Park in Morgantown, West Virginia. The ice arena has a 185' X 85' sized ice sheet.

It is also the home to the West Virginia Mountaineers men's ice hockey team competing at the ACHA Division I level in the College Hockey Mid-America. as well as an auxiliary team competing at the Division II level of the NCHA. The arena is also home to several local high school ice hockey teams, and is used by local figure skating clubs, youth, and adult recreational ice hockey leagues, as well as public skating.
