= College Hockey Mid-America =

ACHA ice hockey conference

- Conference: ACHA
- Founded: 2006
- Sports fielded: Men's college ice hockey
- Division: Division I
- No. of teams: 7
- Headquarters: Pittsburgh, Pennsylvania
- Region: Western Pennsylvania, Ohio, West Virginia
- Most recent champion: West Virginia University (2025–2026)
- Most titles: John Carroll and Robert Morris (4 titles each)
- Website: CHMA Website

Locations

College Hockey Mid-America (CHMA) is an American Collegiate Hockey Association Division I ice hockey conference with teams in Ohio, Western Pennsylvania, and West Virginia. The league was formed in 2006 after members of the now defunct University Hockey League organized the league and moved from the ACHA's Division II to Division I.

== Season format ==
The conference formed in 2006 after members of the now defunct University Hockey League organized the league and moved from the ACHA's Division II to Division I. With eight members, each CHMA team plays every other team in a home and away series, producing a regular season of 14 games. Prior to the 2018-19 season, the regular season champion received an automatic bid to the ACHA Division I National Tournament. Starting with the 2019 National Tournament, the CHMA awarded the playoff champion the conference's automatic bid. In 2010, season champion Slippery Rock declined their bid to the national tournament. In 2012, the conference experienced expansion when Mercyhurst and Robert Morris joined. In 2020, Slippery Rock suspended their ACHA Men's Division 1 team. At the same time, the conference added Kent State, who began conference play in the 2021-22 season. The University of Pittsburgh left the conference for the Eastern States Collegiate Hockey League beginning with the 2022-23 season.

== Membership ==
Of the seven member schools, five compete at the Division I level of NCAA, one at Division II, and one at Division III.

School	Location	Nickname	Primary conference	Website	Team colors
Duquesne University	Pittsburgh, PA	Dukes	Atlantic 10 (D-I)		
Indiana University of Pennsylvania	Indiana, PA	Crimson Hawks	PSAC (D-II)		
John Carroll University	University Heights, OH	Blue Streaks	Ohio Athletic Conference (D-III)		
Mercyhurst University	Erie, PA	Lakers	NEC (D-I)		
Robert Morris University	Moon Township, PA	Colonials	Horizon League (D-I)		
West Virginia University	Morgantown, WV	Mountaineers	Big 12 Conference (D-I)		
Kent State University	Kent, OH	Golden Flashes	Mid-American Conference (D-I)		

- Mercyhurst and Robert Morris joined in 2012. Kent State joined in 2021.

Note: Robert Morris has a NCAA Division I hockey team competing in Atlantic Hockey America.

=== Conference arenas ===
School	Home arena	Location	Capacity
Duquesne	Alpha Ice Complex	Harmarville, Pennsylvania	1,200
IUP	S&T Bank Arena	Indiana, Pennsylvania	1,000
John Carroll	Gilmour Academy Ice Arena	Gates Mills, Ohio	800
Mercyhurst	Mercyhurst Ice Center	Erie, Pennsylvania	1,500
Robert Morris	Clearview Arena	Neville Township, Pennsylvania	1,200
West Virginia	Morgantown Municipal Ice Arena	Morgantown, West Virginia	500
Kent State	Kent State University Ice Arena	Kent, Ohio	1,500

== Former members ==
- University of Pittsburgh moved to Eastern States Collegiate Hockey League, then to the ACC Hockey League
- Washington & Jefferson College moved to ACHA Division III
- Youngstown State University moved to ACHA Division II
- Slippery Rock University dropped ACHA Division I

== Past Champions ==
Season	Regular season	Tournament	Tournament site
2006–2007	Washington & Jefferson	Duquesne	Alpha Ice Complex, Harmarville, Pennsylvania
2007–2008	West Virginia	Washington & Jefferson	Ice Zone, Boardman, Ohio
2008–2009	Duquesne	Duquesne	Ice Castle Arena, Castle Shannon, Pennsylvania
2009–2010	Slippery Rock	West Virginia	S&T Bank Arena, Indiana, Pennsylvania
2010–2011	Slippery Rock	Slippery Rock	WesBanco Arena, Wheeling, West Virginia
2011–2012	West Virginia	West Virginia	Alpha Ice Complex, Harmarville, Pennsylvania
2012–2013	John Carroll	Mercyhurst	S&T Bank Arena, Indiana, Pennsylvania
2013–2014	West Virginia	West Virginia	Gilmour Academy, Gates Mills, Ohio
2014–2015	Robert Morris	Robert Morris	BladeRunners, Harmarville, Pennsylvania
2015–2016	Mercyhurst	Pittsburgh	Gilmour Academy, Gates Mills, Ohio
2016–2017	Pittsburgh	John Carroll	Colonials Arena, Neville Township, Pennsylvania
2017–2018	Pittsburgh	John Carroll	Mercyhurst Ice Center, Erie, Pennsylvania
2018–2019	IUP	Robert Morris	Alpha Ice Complex, Harmarville, Pennsylvania
2019–2020	Pittsburgh	IUP	Alpha Ice Complex, Harmarville, Pennsylvania
2020–2021	Robert Morris*	Robert Morris*	Colonials Arena, Neville Township, Pennsylvania
2021–2022	Pittsburgh	John Carroll	Gilmour Academy, Gates Mills, Ohio
2022–2023	IUP	Robert Morris	S&T Bank Arena, Indiana, Pennsylvania
2023–2024	IUP	IUP	Colonials Arena, Neville Township, Pennsylvania
2024–2025	IUP	John Carroll	Printscape Arena, Canonsburg, Pennsylvania
2025–2026	IUP	West Virginia	Hope Gas Ice Pavilion at Mylan Park, Morgantown, West Virginia

- Robert Morris completed a shortened 2020–21 season of five games due to the COVID-19 pandemic. The Colonials defeated the West Virginia Mountaineers in a three-team CHMA Tournament in March 2021.

== National Tournament results ==
Since the 2007–08 season, the conference's regular season champion received an automatic bid to the Division I national tournament. Starting with the 2018-19 season, the conference's playoff champion received an automatic bid to the Division I national tournament. In the conference's first season in 2006–07, West Virginia earned a spot in the tournament based on their national ranking, winning neither the regular season nor the conference tournament. Washington & Jefferson College also earned a berth to the 2006–07 ACHA Division I National Tournament having won the CHMA regular season title and ranking 14th overall. In the 2021–2022 season, the conference saw two teams represented for the third time in sixteen seasons.

- 2026: #24 West Virginia defeated in first round by #9 Adrian.
- 2025: #22 John Carroll defeated in first round by #11 Calvin.
- 2024: #22 Indiana (PA) defeated in first round by #11 Purdue Northwest.
- 2023: #18 Robert Morris (PA) defeated in first round by #15 Illinois State.
- 2022: #13 Pittsburgh defeated #20 Navy in first round; defeated in second round by #4 Nevada-Las Vegas / #20 John Carroll defeated in first round by #14 Maryville.
- 2021: #2 Robert Morris defeated #15 Davenport in first round; was defeated in second round by #7 Indiana Tech.
- 2020: #19 Indiana (PA) was scheduled to play #14 Drexel in the first round. The game, as well as the entire 2020 National Tournament, was canceled on March 12, 2020 due to public health concerns related to the novel coronavirus, or COVID-19.
- 2019: #20 Robert Morris defeated in first round by #13 UNLV.
- 2018: #18 Pittsburgh defeated in first round by #15 Stony Brook.
- 2017: #19 Pittsburgh defeated in first round by #14 Oklahoma.
- 2016: #19 Mercyhurst defeated in first round by #14 Delaware.
- 2015: #18 Robert Morris defeated in first round by #15 Niagara / #20 John Carroll (HOST) defeated in first round by #13 Illinois.
- 2014: #20 West Virginia defeated in first round by #13 Navy.
- 2013: #20 John Carroll defeated in first round by #13 Liberty.
- 2012: #17 West Virginia defeated #16 Rutgers in first round; was defeated in second round by #1 Penn State.
- 2011: #16 Slippery Rock defeated in first round by #1 Lindenwood; won 15th-place consolation game against #15 Rutgers.
- 2010: Slippery Rock declined invitation; was not replaced by another conference team.
- 2009: #15 Duquesne defeated in first round by #2 Penn State.
- 2008: #14 West Virginia defeated in first round by #3 Penn State.
- 2007: #13 West Virginia defeated in first round by #4 Rhode Island; won 13th-place consolation game against #9 Kent State / #14 Washington & Jefferson defeated in first round by #3 Illinois; lost 15th place consolation game against #16 Robert Morris (PA).

== See also ==
- American Collegiate Hockey Association
- List of ice hockey leagues
