= Great Valley Nature Center =

American environmental organization

Coordinates: 40.091211°N 75.544328°W

- Formation: 1974
- Dissolved: March 2017; 9 years ago
- Type: Charitable Organization
- Location: Malvern, Pennsylvania, U.S.
- Region served: Greater Philadelphia
- Executive Director: Tom Pascocello

The Great Valley Nature Center was an American organization dedicated to raising public awareness on environmental issues through educational exhibits, demonstrations, and workshops. The Great Valley Nature Center was located in Malvern, Pennsylvania. It consists of fields, streams, ponds, woods, and diverse habitats. Also featured was Birds of Prey Center. All birds of prey are no longer present a replica Native American Lenape village, a Pennsylvania wildflower garden, a maple sugar house, and a hands-on exhibit area were also present.

== History ==
Since its November 1974 incorporation, Great Valley Nature Center (formerly the Nature Center of Charlestown) has provided the Greater Philadelphia region, including Chester County, with environmental education opportunities. Arnold Bartschi contributed the land and start-up costs to establish the nature center.

As of 2017, the corporation has been dissolved. As of Spring 2019, the property is currently owned by a bank that wishes to foreclose upon it and sell it to a private party. Charlestown is currently fighting against such action
