= Whites' Woods Nature Center =

National park in Pennsylvania, United States

Coordinates: 40.628453°N 79.163385°W

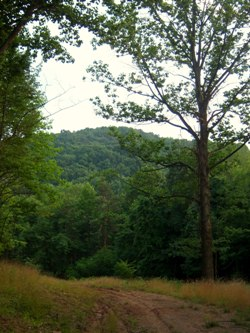

The Whites' Woods Nature Center is a 250-acre (1.0 km^{2}) nature center in Indiana County, Pennsylvania, USA. It is publicly owned by White Township.

== Trees ==
Whites' Woods contains many trees native to Pennsylvania. Oaks, maples, pines, tulip poplar and magnolias are among the many trees common in this area.
