= BladeRunners Ice Complex =

Ice hockey rink in Bethel Park, Pennsylvania

Coordinates: 40.539557°N 79.834533°W

- Interactive map of BladeRunners Ice Complex
- Location: Bethel Park, Pennsylvania
- Owner: Kratsa Properties

The BladeRunners Ice Complex was a group of ice hockey rinks and sports facilities which were located in Western Pennsylvania.

== History ==
BladeRunners' first location opened in Harmarville, Pennsylvania in 1992; it was the first twin-ice facility in the Pittsburgh region. Two other locations opened in Warrendale, Pennsylvania in 1994 and in Bethel Park, Pennsylvania in 1995. The Harmarville location gained a third rink in 2003.

BladeRunners hosted the 2005 American Collegiate Hockey Association Division III Men's National Hockey Championships and the USA in-line Girl's 16 and under national team. It was the home ice for several collegiate hockey programs, including Slippery Rock University, California University of Pennsylvania, and Pittsburgh Panthers.

In 2012, the owners considered selling the Warrendale facility to the Grace Community Church. However, the sale did not proceed and nearly all tenants returned.

In 2015, all of BladeRunners' locations were sold: the Warrendale rink became Baierl Ice Complex, the Harmarville location became Alpha Ice Complex, and Bethel Park location underwent a conversion to a YMCA.

== Leagues ==
Bladerunners Ice Complex hosted a variety of ice hockey leagues, from junior age to college.

- PIHL (Pennsylvania high school league)
- American Collegiate Hockey Association – College Hockey Mid-America
- North Pittsburgh Hockey League
- Various inline and ice hockey adult leagues

== Other activities ==
Select Bladerunners Ice Complexes offered on-ice bumper cars. Figure skating, sticktimes, pickup hockey, learn to skate, learn to play hockey, and various other activities were also offered.

== Tenants ==
Several teams called their local Bladerunners their home rink:

- Bethel Park High School
- Shaler Area High School
- Mars Area High School
- North Allegheny High School
- Fox Chapel High School
- Seneca Valley High School
- University of Pittsburgh
- California University of Pennsylvania
- Slippery Rock University of Pennsylvania
- South Allegheny School District
