= Penn State Golf Courses =

Two golf courses in Pennsylvania, U.S.

Coordinates: 40.78900°N 77.88021°W

- Penn State Golf Courses logo.
- Interactive map of Penn State Golf Courses

Club information
- Location: 1523 W College Ave; State College, Pennsylvania
- Established: 1926
- Operator: Pennsylvania State University
- Tota holes: 36
- Website: Penn State Golf Courses and Facilities; Pennstategolfcourses.com

Blue Course
- Par: 72
- Length: 7,219 yards (6,601 m)
- Course rating: 75.2
- Slope rating: 138

White Course
- Par: 72
- Length: 6,328 yards (5,786 m)
- Course rating: 71.1
- Slope rating: 129

The Penn State Golf Courses are two 18-hole courses located in State College, Pennsylvania, operated by Pennsylvania State University. The individual 18-hole courses are named after the school colors, blue and white. They, along with their practice facilities, are the home of the men's and women's golf team and all intramural golf activities of the university. The practice facilities include a double-sided driving range with both natural grass and artificial teeing areas, and several putting greens located throughout the facility.

== History ==
=== 20th century ===
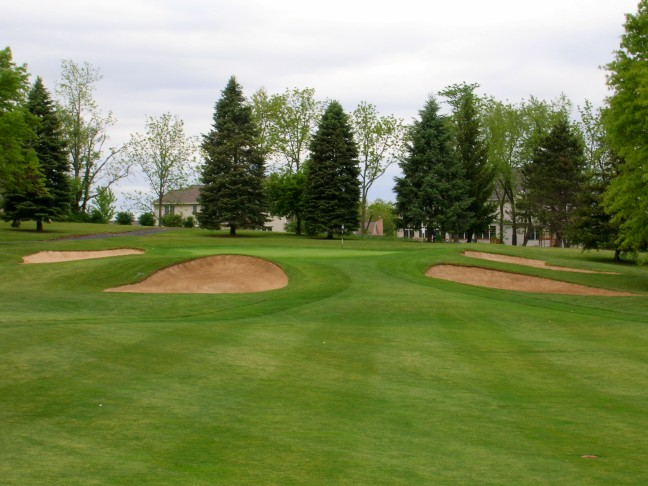
The first green of the White Course, which was the first green of the Blue Course prior to 1994 revisions.

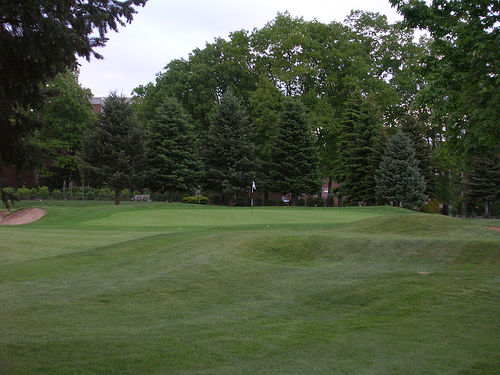
The eleventh course green, which was the 18th green prior to the 1994 revisions.

Golf has been played at the university since the first rise in popularity of the sport in the United States in the latter half of the 19th century. However, the sport was not popular enough to merit a formalized golf course until 1921 when two professors, Bob Rutherford and R.D. Pryde, laid out nine holes on the west end of campus. The sport apparently became quite popular as nine additional holes were laid out in 1922 by noted golf course architect Willie Park, Jr., with the work being completed in 1926. While keeping the general layout of the initial nine holes, Park significantly altered the greens and bunkers to match his own style of design.

The Willie Park course came to be known as the College Golf Course, since the school had yet to be named a full-fledged university. The course featured large push-up style greens and some dramatic bunkering much like those found at Park's Sunningdale (Old) Course. Wide fairways and closely mown areas around the green integrated the features together and provided a diverse play field for Penn State golfers.

Two notable changes were made to the golf course during this beginning era. Sometime between the opening of the course in 1926 and 1939, the first hole was abandoned. The first tee had been located near the golf pro shop in Rec Hall, however, the site also doubled as the dirt road that would become Atherton Street (U.S. Highway 322). This not only presented a logistical problem, but a safety issue as well, and a new hole would be needed. The new hole was constructed near the old hole, but as a par-3 with a new greensite. The old first green is still used to this day in vastly different design as a practice putting green.

Having a par-3 as an opening hole proved to be unpopular and it was during this time that the order of holes was switched, with the 10th hole becoming the 1st hole. The new par-3 served as the tenth and the nines were flipped from there.

Another set of changes in 1949 included the addition of several large specimen trees planted around the course by Frank James, who served as a construction foreman for Park and other noted golf architect, Donald Ross.

The sixties saw an era of increased tree planting on the course, as corridors of play were lined with many small pine trees. The university (a designation earned in 1954) had decided to use the golf course open areas as a test facility for various trees and forestry techniques. While the dual use of the golf course is a noble idea, the tree plants did substantially alter the character and playability of the golf course, and to this day have caused significant changes to be seen.

By the late 1960s, changes in technology and a growth in the popularity in the game, mainly led by the professional success of Pennsylvania native Arnold Palmer, created demand for a second course. The university hired the golf architecture firm of Harrison & Grabin (both Penn State graduates) to design what would become the "Blue" Course. The University Golf Course's name would be changed to the White Course, but would still exist in the same form. From the beginning the Blue Course was intended to be a better representation of the game during that era, and this most noted in its total length of 7,008 yards (a full 1,000 yards (910 m) longer than the White Course). This course was built farther west of the White Course and was operated from a separate location off West College Avenue. The 3rd Hole of the Blue Course ran next to and parallel to the 13th hole of the White Course.

The Blue Course became the home course for all intercollegiate golf competitions at Penn State, primarily because of its length.

By 1993, the expansion of the university and the inconvenience of running the golf operation from two separate locations lead Penn State to consider new alternatives regarding the golf courses. Noted golf architecture firm Ault, Clark & Associates (ACA) developed a master plan that would retrofit both courses to be run from the Blue Course's West College Avenue site and add an additional nine holes to become the second nine of a new Blue Course.

The plan changed several holes on the existing Blue and White Courses. These changes eliminated the existing 3rd, 8th and 9th holes of the Blue Course, and also the 13th hole of the White to allow for a new White Course front nine consisting of the remaining holes from the old Blue. The new back nine for the Blue Course reflecting a typical ACA design. Six holes that did not fit in the new White Course routing were retained as a small practice course.

The opening of a new clubhouse in 1994 signalled the new era of Penn State golf. However, university expansion necessitated the destruction and development of the six hole course, which had been dubbed the "Nittany Course". These holes were completely eliminated by 2002.

=== 21st century ===
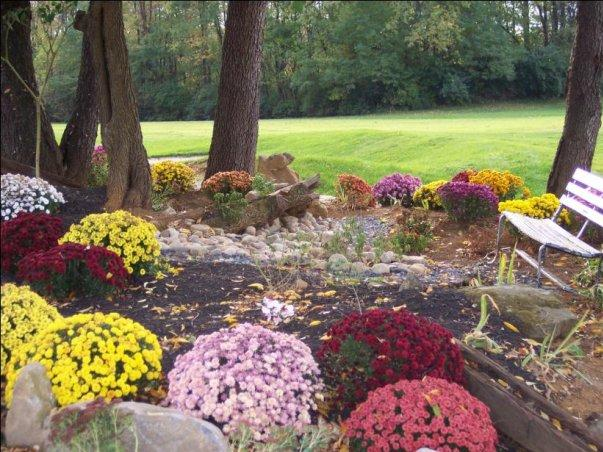
A scenic garden on the Blue Course.

As of November 2005, work was done on some significant renovations to both courses. Tree removal and the construction of new tee boxes to add length, major changes to the 7th and 8th holes of the Blue Course were completed in the spring of 2007. The new "Lion" tees now measure 7,228 yards (6,609 m) Par 72. Several changes were also made to the Nittany Lion golf teams practice facilities. In August 2007 a 2-acre (8,100 m^{2}) area short-game practice facility was opened that is for the exclusive use of the Nittany Lions Men's and Women's Varsity Teams. The area includes two 5,000 sq ft (460 m^{2}) greens with one used exclusively for putting and one attached to a 100-yard (91 m) and 50-yard (46 m) fairway for wedge practice.

== Scorecard ==
=== Blue Course ===
Blue Course
| Tee | Rating/Slope | 1 | 2 | 3 | 4 | 5 | 6 | 7 | 8 | 9 | Out | 10 | 11 | 12 | 13 | 14 | 15 | 16 | 17 | 18 | In | Total |
| Par | | 4 | 4 | 4 | 3 | 5 | 4 | 4 | 3 | 5 | 36 | 4 | 4 | 5 | 4 | 3 | 4 | 4 | 3 | 5 | 36 | 72 |
| Black | 75.2 / 138 | 396 | 424 | 480 | 216 | 581 | 401 | 465 | 215 | 518 | 3696 | 440 | 351 | 623 | 382 | 190 | 411 | 439 | 181 | 501 | 3518 | 7214 |
| Blue | 72.3 / 134 | 366 | 398 | 402 | 190 | 550 | 390 | 432 | 175 | 511 | 3414 | 400 | 318 | 602 | 363 | 168 | 343 | 419 | 172 | 487 | 3272 | 6686 |
| White | 70.4 / 128 | 356 | 365 | 394 | 180 | 507 | 380 | 400 | 161 | 504 | 3247 | 383 | 310 | 566 | 353 | 142 | 320 | 376 | 162 | 446 | 3058 | 6305 |
| Gold | 69.1 / 123 | 348 | 331 | 386 | 169 | 489 | 371 | 370 | 138 | 449 | 3051 | 372 | 276 | 527 | 326 | 131 | 287 | 364 | 152 | 432 | 2867 | 5918 |
| SI | Men’s | 9 | 7 | 1 | 15 | 13 | 5 | 3 | 17 | 11 | | 6 | 16 | 2 | 12 | 14 | 8 | 4 | 18 | 10 |
| Red | 69.7 / 126 | 284 | 247 | 281 | 135 | 391 | 304 | 332 | 129 | 439 | 2542 | 313 | 260 | 471 | 263 | 105 | 274 | 306 | 144 | 397 | 2533 | 5075 |
| SI | Women’s | 9 | 13 | 11 | 15 | 3 | 7 | 5 | 17 | 1 | | 6 | 14 | 2 | 12 | 18 | 10 | 8 | 16 | 4 |

=== White Course ===
White Course
| Tee | Rating/Slope | 1 | 2 | 3 | 4 | 5 | 6 | 7 | 8 | 9 | Out | 10 | 11 | 12 | 13 | 14 | 15 | 16 | 17 | 18 | In | Total |
| Par | | 4 | 4 | 5 | 4 | 3 | 5 | 3 | 4 | 4 | 36 | 5 | 4 | 3 | 5 | 3 | 4 | 3 | 4 | 5 | 36 | 72 |
| Blue | 70.5 / 130 | 401 | 379 | 534 | 339 | 202 | 513 | 169 | 352 | 356 | 3245 | 465 | 357 | 169 | 565 | 210 | 323 | 203 | 315 | 492 | 3099 | 6344 |
| White | 69.4 / 127 | 389 | 358 | 523 | 326 | 159 | 496 | 163 | 345 | 350 | 3109 | 458 | 349 | 160 | 556 | 184 | 314 | 190 | 302 | 480 | 2993 | 6102 |
| Gold | 68.1 / 124 | 363 | 340 | 515 | 318 | 142 | 444 | 141 | 325 | 345 | 2933 | 453 | 340 | 150 | 529 | 176 | 306 | 166 | 295 | 400 | 2815 | 5748 |
| SI | Men’s | 9 | 5 | 1 | 13 | 17 | 3 | 15 | 11 | 7 | | 8 | 4 | 16 | 2 | 18 | 10 | 14 | 12 | 6 |
| Red | 68.5 / 117 | 299 | 309 | 431 | 269 | 125 | 388 | 134 | 318 | 265 | 2538 | 352 | 305 | 129 | 458 | 131 | 242 | 148 | 281 | 390 | 2436 | 4974 |
| SI | Women’s | 9 | 7 | 1 | 11 | 17 | 3 | 15 | 5 | 13 | | 6 | 8 | 18 | 2 | 16 | 12 | 14 | 10 | 4 |

== Cross Country ==
The Blue and White Courses host home meets for the Penn State Nittany Lions men's and women's cross country teams.
