= Shaver's Creek Environmental Center =

Educational facility in Pennsylvania, US

Coordinates: 40.66677°N 77.90971°W

Shaver's Creek Environmental Center is located between State College and Huntingdon, Pennsylvania, in the Stone Valley Recreation Area. This is part of the Penn State Experimental Forest. The center operates on 7,000 acres (28 km^{2}) and contains 72-acre (290,000 m^{2}), freshwater Lake Perez. Each year more than 100,000 people visit the center, which is open daily from February 1 to December 15 (excluding Thanksgiving). The Environmental Center contains an amphitheater; classrooms; Welcome Center, Pennsylvania Nature Book and Gift Shop; herb and flower gardens; picnic areas; raptor center; and other displays and exhibits.

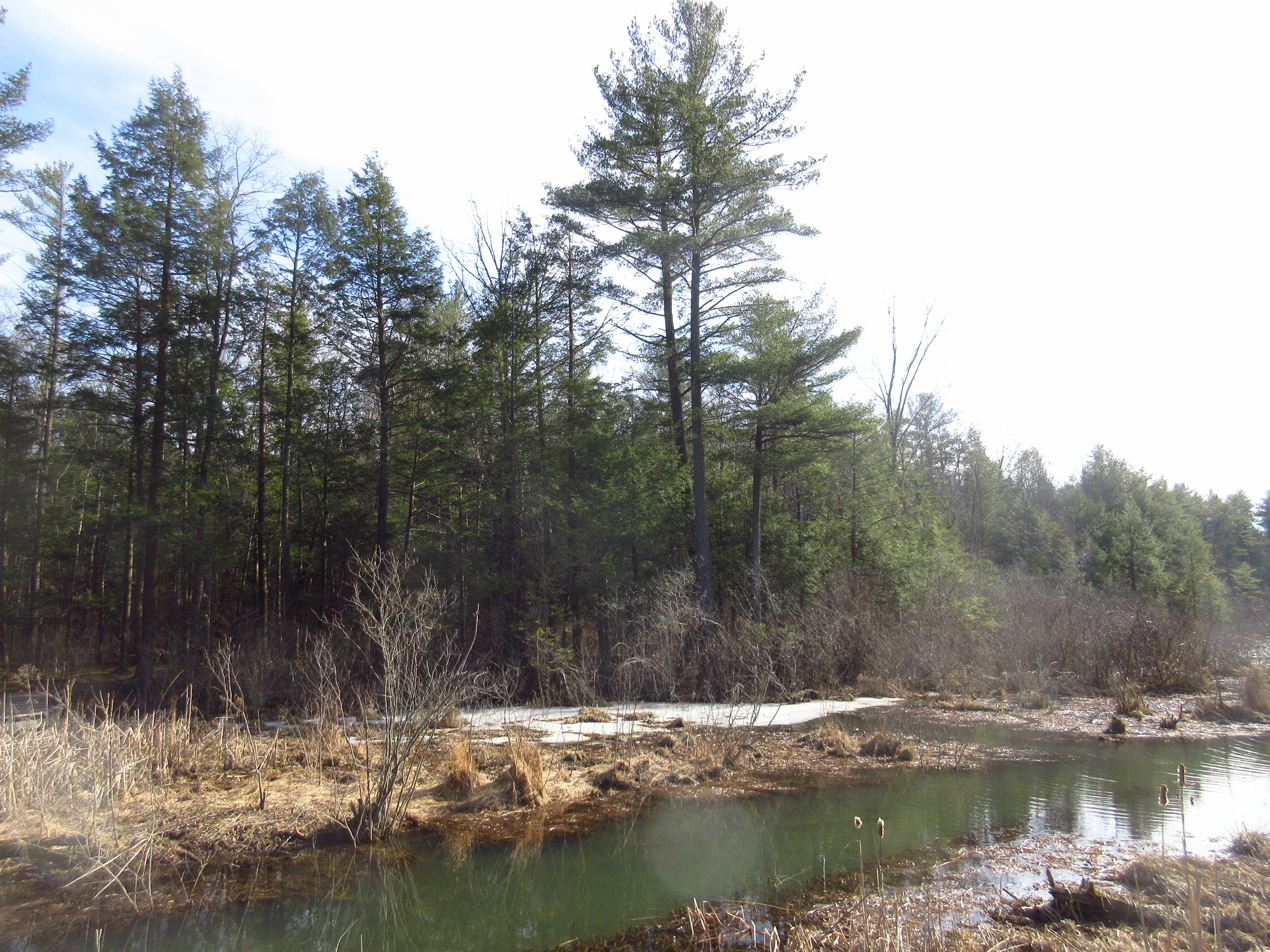
Wetlands at Shaver's Creek.

== Outdoor School ==
Shaver's Creek Outdoor School is a 50-year-old program that aims to provide upper elementary school-aged children with a positive outdoor experience. Outdoor School is a four-day, three-night residential program in which Penn State students give lessons in topics of outdoor education. Students come from Centre, Huntingdon, Mifflin, and other central Pennsylvania areas.

== The Raptor Center ==
The Shaver's Creek Raptor center houses over 20 birds of prey, all of which have sustained permanent injuries which make them unfit for release back into the wild. The only exception is the American kestrel, who was an illegally raised pet prior to finding a place with Shaver's. The Raptor Center at Shaver's Creek is open to the public daily.

== The Birding Cup ==
The Birding Cup is a fundraising tournament held once a year at Shaver's Creek Environmental Center. The contest calls for teams of at least three birders to identify as many species of birds as they can within a 24-hour period. Contestants are required to remain within the parameters of Huntingdon, Centre, and adjoining counties of Central Pennsylvania.

Following the contest, awards are given at Millbrook Marsh Nature Center in State College, Pennsylvania, in several categories: The Birding Cup (the team which identifies the most species overall); The County Cup (the team that identifies the most species while only searching one county); The Potter Mug (the best team on which at least half of the members have only two years of birding experience); and The Birding Boot (the best team that travels only by non-motorized means, such as biking, hiking, or canoeing).
