= Audubon Society of Western Pennsylvania =

US non-profit organization

The Audubon Society of Western Pennsylvania (ASWP) incorporated in 1942, with a history from back to 1916, is located in Pittsburgh, Pennsylvania, at Beechwood Farms Nature Reserve. The society obtained Todd Nature Reserve in 1942. In 1977 began operating from Beechwood – a 134-acre (0.54 km^{2}) property with over 4 miles (6.4 km) of walking trails.

ASWP has a full-time education staff, a corps of volunteer naturalists who work to educate youth and adults through year-round programming, youth day camps in the summer, and a summer naturalist at Todd Nature Reserve from June to September. The society also runs a series of environmental education camp programs for local schools in the fall. In addition to ongoing education, ASWP hosts a number of community events throughout the year.

ASWP is dedicated to the stewardship of both Beechwood Farms and Todd Nature Reserves, which together total over 400 acres (1.6 km^{2}) of land. Beechwood Farms Nature Reserve's trails are open dawn to dusk year round, and Todd Nature Reserve trails are available dawn to dusk except during the Pennsylvania Deer Hunting Season.

== Conservation initiatives ==
ASWP is involved in a number of conservation initiatives. First, the society works to publicize and aid in the stewardship of the Buffalo Creek Valley, Raccoon Creek, Enlow Fork, and Lower Buffalo Creek Valley Important Bird Areas. The Audubon Center for Native Plants, a nursery developed to propagate native plants, is located at Beechwood. ASWP completed administration of a Watershed Conservation Plan for the Buffalo Creek Watershed, where Todd Nature Reserve is located. Implementation of the plan began in October 2008.
