= Stone Valley Recreation Area =

Outdoor recreational area in Huntingdon County, Pennsylvania

Coordinates: 40.6633°N 77.9150°W

The Stone Valley Recreation Area is an outdoor recreational and educational facility that is operated by Pennsylvania State University. It is located in Huntingdon County near the village of Mooresville.

== History ==
Pennsylvania State University contracted with the federal government in 1940 to construct roads and buildings on the land to help the school's educational program. In 1954, the land was given fully to the university. A dam was finished in 1960 to provide easy access to the area, and the Stone Valley Recreation Area was created.

== Notable features ==
The Stone Valley Recreation Area is a multi-use park that is shared by the Penn State Forestry department, Shaver's Creek Environmental Center and Stone Valley Vertical Adventures.

The 700-acre (2.8 km^{2}) property is located over the mountain from the village of Pine Grove Mills, Pennsylvania, along Shaver's Creek. Hiking and fishing are among the activities available to visitors.

Vertical Adventures, which is operated by Penn State Student Affairs, is a multi-element, high-ropes challenge course that serves the university and surrounding communities by offering team development and group building training. It also hosts a small summer program for middle school and high school children.

The lake at Stone Valley Recreation Area was drained in 2008 when state regulations regarding dam specifications changed. Lake Perez was filled back up in 2014 and is on the Pennsylvania Fish and Boat Commission's restocking list. All boating and fishing activities resumed as of April 2014.
