= Immigration reduction in the United States =

Governmental policy and social reform in the United States

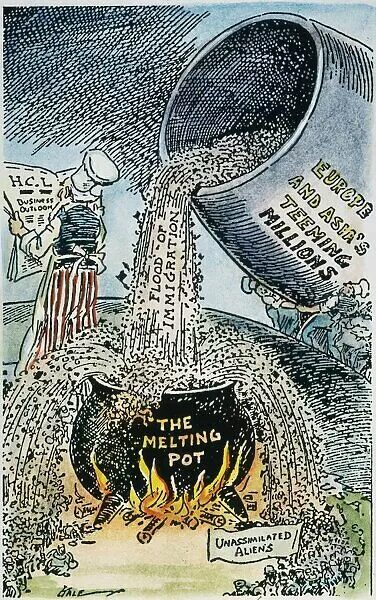
Editorial cartoon, Los Angeles Times, Nov 14, 1920, by E W Gale

Immigration reduction refers to a government and social policy in the United States that advocates a reduction in the amount of immigration allowed into the country. Steps advocated for reducing the numbers of immigrants include advocating stronger action to prevent illegal entry and illegal migration, and reductions in non-immigrant temporary work visas (such as H-1B, L-1 and J-1). Some advocate tightening the requirements for legal immigration requirements to reduce numbers or move the proportions of legal immigrants away from those on family reunification programs to skills-based criteria.

Many immigration reformists only oppose illegal migration and support continued legal immigration methods. Some immigration reductionists want to reduce current legal immigration percentages until fewer adverse effects are created by illegal migration.

== Nativism ==
There have been several discernible groups at various times within the United States, which pushed for immigration restrictions, with separate concerns, origins, and aims; thus there are several antecedents for the modern immigration reduction movement. These include the nativist United States American Party, often called the Know Nothing movement of the mid-19th century, which objected to increased Catholic immigration of predominantly Irish and German origin; the Workingman's Party which objected to immigration laborers from China to California during the late-19th century, a sentiment that ultimately led to the Chinese Exclusion Act of 1882; the Immigration Restriction League, which objected to greatly increased immigration from southern and eastern Europe during the late-19th and early 20th centuries, and the joint congressional Dillingham Commission, which studied this latter complaint and proposed numerical restrictions. Eventually, following World War I, these studies led to the Emergency Quota Act of 1921 and the Immigration Act of 1924.

== Labor unions ==
Organized labor generally favored restrictions, especially from Asia. The National Labor Union (1866–1874) campaigned for immigration restrictions as well as the eight-hour workday, as did the American Federation of Labor under the leadership of Samuel Gompers. The AFL–CIO did not reverse its opposition to immigration until 1999. The early United States Socialist Party was split over the issue, with some Socialist leaders including Jack London and Congressman Victor Berger supporting immigration restrictions; the party as a whole never had consensus and officially opposed only the importation of strikebreakers.

== Overpopulation ==
Concern over overpopulation was stimulated by Paul R. Ehrlich, who both founded Zero Population Growth and published The Population Bomb in 1968. The popular book foretold alarming disasters that would inevitably occur in the next decades. Though some of his predictions did not come to pass, many believe his main points are valid, and they succeeded in inspiring a movement. Environmentalists including David R. Brower and David Foreman took the threat seriously. The Zero Population Growth organization did not involve itself, for the most part, in U.S. immigration policy, and a subset of the overpopulation movement grew which believed that immigration needed to be reduced, arguing that immigration was driving most U.S. population growth. These activists founded organizations separate from ZPG which would specifically address immigration issues. Among the important early organizations was Negative Population Growth, founded in 1972 by Donald Mann.

== FAIR ==
The leading inspiration for the modern movement is the Federation for American Immigration Reform (FAIR). Founded in 1979, it is the largest and best funded organization in the movement. Three years later, John Tanton formed US, Inc. as an incubator and funding source to help form other organizations. According to public tax records, US, Inc, FAIR, and other Tanton organizations have received large donations from the Pioneer Fund and from the foundations controlled by Richard Mellon Scaife. Tanton created US English (an English-only advocacy group), the Center for Immigration Studies (CIS), ProEnglish (another English-only advocacy group), and The Social Contract Press. US, Inc and FAIR have provided funding and logistical support to other organizations, including American Immigration Control Foundation (AICF), California Coalition for Immigration Reform (CCIR), Californians for Population Stabilization (CAPS), and the recent Protect Arizona Now (PAN) initiative, Proposition 200.

The movement seemed to be triumphant in 1994 when California voters passed Proposition 187, an initiative that limited benefits to illegal aliens that had been authored and promoted by CCIR. However, one federal judge enjoined implementation of parts of the law as unconstitutional, and Democratic governor Gray Davis refused to pursue an appeal of the lower court decision, abandoning Proposition 187. Residual resentment over the racially divisive campaigns on both sides of the issue made immigration a topic that politicians largely avoided dealing with. A notable exception has been Tom Tancredo, who was elected to Congress from Littleton, Colorado in 1994. Together with Patrick Buchanan and the Tanton network, Tancredo has emerged as the most conspicuous voice advocating immigration reduction in Congress.

== The Alliance for Stabilizing America's Population ==
The immigration reduction movement was partly revived by The Alliance for Stabilizing America's Population coalition. In 1997 members from a range of immigration reduction and environmental organizations met to rededicate themselves to the effort of population stabilization. Organized by Population-Environment Balance, it included such diverse groups as:

- Brotherhood Organization of a New Destiny (BOND)
- California Coalition for Immigration Reform (CCIR)
- California Wildlife Defenders (CWD)
- Californians for Population Stabilization (CAPS)
- Carrying Capacity Network (CCN)

Another effort was the coalition formed under the name U.S. Sustainable Population Policy Project (USS3P) in 1996 by Douglas La Follette and David Pimentel. The USS3P membership contained many immigration reductionists of the time. In 1999 it sought cosponsors for a major national conference on immigration. A number of major individuals and minor organizations joined as co-sponsors, but no large national groups joined and it folded in 2000 without holding the intended conference.

The Internet offered new opportunities for communication by immigration reductionists, as it has with countless other movements. Peter Brimelow founded his VDARE writers collective in 1999. The year 1999 also saw the founding by Craig Nelson of ProjectUSA in New York City, which used billboards to advertise Census Bureau and other statistics about immigration in a campaign dubbed "Billboard Democracy," and publishes an ezine in which the term "Minuteman" was first used (2002) in connection with civilian border patrols. The NumbersUSA group founded by Roy Beck set up an automated system for website visitors to send advocacy faxes to their legislators on immigration topics. Numerous websites, email lists, weblogs, and other resources furthered the effort.

The electoral success of Arizona's Proposition 200, PAN, indicates the support for immigration reductionism among voters. The PAN initiative qualified for the ballot following the expenditure by FAIR of hundreds of thousands of dollars for signature gathering, plus comparable sums for campaigning with some additional amounts raised locally. The initiative was adopted by the public by a significant margin and is likely to inspire similar efforts in other states. The success of Proposition 200 in Arizona was followed in April 2005 by the Minuteman Project, in which volunteers came to Arizona to help patrol the border, although this project did not have the support of the United States Border Patrol and generated some controversy. The organizers of the Minuteman Project have announced plans for similar projects in other states including Texas, California, and Michigan.

=== Candidate Donald Trump, 2016 ===
In 2016, businessman and television personality Donald Trump ran a successful presidential campaign promising to stop the flow of illegal immigration, deport all illegal immigrants, and limit legal immigration. He called for a ban on Muslims from entering the U.S., travel to the US from what he called "terror prone" countries such as Iran, Libya, Somalia and Syria, a tripling of the number of Immigration and Customs Enforcement agents, and construction of a wall along the US-Mexico border.

Trump also vowed to cut off all federal funding to sanctuary cities, end birthright citizenship, and immediately terminate President Obama's two executive amnesties including Deferred Action for Parents of Americans and Lawful Permanent Residents and Deferred Action for Childhood Arrivals (DACA) which he said were illegal.

Although Democratic nominee Hillary Clinton and even some Republicans (such as Mitt Romney) called Trump's platform racist, xenophobic, and Islamophobic, Trump's proposals found broad support in the heartland and the south.

After his election as president, Trump enacted a number of policies aimed at reducing immigration, including signing executive orders banning entry to the United States for residents of multiple, Muslim-majority nations, separating families of immigrants, reversing the DACA program, greatly limiting the number of refugees and asylum seekers allowed into the country, and strengthening the southern border.

== Targeted immigration levels ==
Immigration reductionists differ on the ideal level of immigration they would like to see into the United States. Some believe the numbers should be set each year at whatever level would, in conjunction with the current fertility rate and emigration from the U.S., maintain zero population growth in the country. The most prominent immigration reductionist in government today is U.S. Congressman Tom Tancredo, R-CO. Tancredo has authored a bill that calls for limiting annual immigration to between 30,000 and 300,000. The organization, Population-Environment Balance (PEB), issued an "Immigration Moratorium Action Plan" calling for a "non-piercable" cap of 100,000 persons annually, which would be a 95% cut from current levels.

There are also some who support a moratorium on immigration. The Diversity Alliance for a Sustainable America claims that 43% of Californians polled said that a 3-year moratorium on immigration would be beneficial to the state (compared to 40% who said it would be futile). The America First Party calls for a ten-year moratorium, with only spouses and children of citizens allowed in. Other advocates for moratoriums include the Reform Party and 2004 Constitution Party presidential candidate Michael Peroutka.

The Carrying Capacity Network (CCN) and Population-Environment Balance (now defunct), two groups that both operate out of the same Washington, D.C. address, issue frequent statements that advocating for the numbers recommended by the Jordan Commission, 700,000 annually, is "counter-productive". In a National Alert, the CCN warned that organizations supporting numbers higher than 300,000 undercut the movement, and they specifically criticize the Federation for American Immigration Reform and NumbersUSA.

Some groups not connected to the immigration reduction movement nonetheless support a reduction to legal immigration levels of around 500,000 to 600,000. In their 1997 book, Misplaced Blame, Alan Durning and Christopher Crowther of Northwest Environment Watch write that illegal immigration gets too much attention, and identify five main sources of population growth, including lack of access to family planning as well as a misguided legal immigration policy, and subsidies to domestic migration. They readily admit that immigration should be reduced by an unspecified amount, but they also show concern for the rights of existing residents.

== Proposed methods to reduce illegal immigration ==
=== Border barriers ===
The United States-Mexico barrier has been partially constructed to reduce the flow of unauthorized migrants into the United States. Donald Trump has proposed an expansion of the wall.

=== E-Verify ===
A map of U.S. state laws requiring the use of E-Verify as of 2015: State requires E-Verify for most public employers State requires E-Verify for some public contractors and subcontractors State requires E-Verify for all employers

=== Sanctuary city bans ===
Pro-sanctuary states are in blue, states which have banned sanctuary cities are in red, and states in gray have no official policy.

=== Attrition through enforcement ===
Pro-enforcement U.S. think tanks such as the Center for Immigration Studies have supported an "attrition through enforcement" doctrine. The aim here is to, as that organization states, "Shrink the illegal population through consistent, across-the-board enforcement of the immigration law. By deterring the settlement of new illegals, by increasing deportations to the extent possible, and, most importantly, by increasing the number of illegals already here who give up and deport themselves, the United States can bring about an annual decrease in the illegal-alien population, rather than allowing it to continually increase." This approach concedes that mass deportations of illegal aliens is logistically, economically, and politically untenable.

Arizona SB1070, the broadest and strictest anti-illegal immigration measure enacted in the U.S. in generations, explicitly states its intent as implementing the attrition through enforcement strategy.

=== Intergovernmental cooperation ===
Conservative blogger Michelle Malkin supports coordination with federal authorities through the use of Section 287(g) of the Illegal Immigration Reform and Immigrant Responsibility Act. Section 287(g) provides for the deputization of state and local law enforcement officers, for the purposes of reporting of immigrants who have violated immigration law. Morristown, New Jersey mayor Donald Cresitello (Democrat) has sought to deputize his police as immigration agents. Newark, New Jersey city councilman Ron Rice, Jr. has proposed a resolution mandating police to report felony suspects when they are found to be in the United States illegally. Furthermore, the Attorney General of New Jersey Anne Milgram has expanded officers power regarding illegal immigrants. She told the state police to inform federal authorities when an illegal immigrant is arrested in an indictable crime or for drunk driving. There are an estimated 380,000 people living in New Jersey without proper immigration documents. She said that she wanted local, county and state police to hand more serious cases directly to Immigration and Customs Enforcement.

=== Legislative initiatives ===
Others focus on lobbying to lower future illegal immigration levels through congressional action, and to fight amnesties for existing illegal immigrants.

Many immigration restrictionists question the 1898 Supreme Court ruling U.S. v. Wong Kim Ark, which held that individuals born on U.S. soil to non-citizen parents are U.S. citizens and guaranteed all the rights thereof. They feel that citizenship should be denied to the children of immigrants without valid immigration status. Thus they have sought to end birthright citizenship, through a constitutional amendment or a congressional act.

Denial of public benefits to undocumented individuals is believed to remove the incentives and rewards for illegal immigrants. The 1994 California Proposition 187 and the 2004 Arizona Proposition 200 Protect Arizona Now were written to require proof of legal status in order to receive non-mandated benefits.

On January 29, 2025, a majority of legislators in the Tennessee Senate voted to adopt SB6002, a bill which "creates criminal penalties for officials who adopt sanctuary policies and subsequently requires their removal from office upon conviction". The act charges a Class E felony, resulting in a potential prison sentence of between one and six years, upon "each official who, in their capacity as a member of the governing body of a local government, votes in the affirmative to adopt a sanctuary policy".

== Differences within immigration reductionism ==
Many who support reduced immigration numbers oppose association with the more extreme groups. The Federation for American Immigration Reform has spoken out in 2004 against the views of another reductionist leader, Virginia Abernethy, calling her views "repulsive separatist views," and called on her to resign from the advisory board of Protect Arizona Now in Arizona. PEB and CCN are also critical of FAIR for FAIR's support of a national ID card, which PEB and CCN oppose. The Protect Arizona Now movement split, with two rival state-level organizations, one supported by FAIR, the other supported by PEB and CCN, working to support the passage of the ballot initiative.

== Public opinion on immigration reduction ==
Some polls such as a late 2013 survey by the Public Religion Research Institute have found widespread opposition to immigration reduction. Said survey stated that 63% of Americans support creating a pathway to citizenship so that formerly illegal residents of the U.S. could gradually acquire it while only 18% back a hypothetical plan to find and deport all illegal residents.

== See also ==
- Xenophobia in the United States
- Illegal immigration to the United States
- Immigration reform
- Population control
- Great Replacement conspiracy theory in the United States
- History of homeland security in the United States
- Know Nothing, 1850s
- Nativism in United States politics
- Save Our State
- Republicans for Immigration Reform
- Opposition to immigration
