= Immigrant invasion =

Nativist rhetoric

Immigrant invasion, or similar phrases that imply that "immigrants are invading the homeland", is a rhetorical device that is used by those who favor nativist, nationalist, and sometimes racist or xenophobic policies.

== Nativism and immigrant invasion ==
"That nativist rhetoric — that immigrants are invading the homeland — has gained ever-greater traction, and political acceptance, across the West amid dislocations wrought by vast waves of migration from the Middle East, Africa and Latin America. In its most extreme form, it is echoed in the online manifesto of the man accused of gunning down 22 people last weekend in El Paso."

— Jo Becker (August 10, 2019). "The Global Machine Behind the Rise of Far-Right Nationalism". The New York Times.

According to the 2004 book entitled Migration Between States and Markets, the phrases "immigrant invasion" or "illegal alien invasion" and similar iterations, are used by nativists to describe what they believe are unassimilated and unassimilable immigrants. Louis Dow Scisco (1868-) coined the term nativism in his 1901 PhD thesis in reference to anti-immigrant, anti-Catholic sentiments in the 1850s in the United States. In his 1955 seminal and most influential academic study of the history of American nativism, Strangers in the Land: Patterns of American Nativism, 1860–1925—which has been reprinted numerous times—John Higham, then a history professor in the University of Michigan, described nativism as "an inflamed and nationalistic type of ethnocentrism." (Note: Higham was writing against the backdrop of the 1954 McCarthy hearings, in which for 36 days, investigative hearings into the alleged infiltration of the federal government agencies—including the CIA—by communists, led by then-Senator Joseph McCarthy, were televised. McCarthy had claimed on February 9, 1950 that he had a list of names and carried out investigations until he was censored in 1957 by the Senate. The televised hearings caused a national upheaval in which the concept of nationalism was revisited.)

== Australia ==
In a Guardian article, La Trobe University's fellow and emeritus professor, Robert Manne wrote that four tabloids owned by the Murdoch family, the Daily Telegraph, the Herald Sun, The Courier-Mail and the Adelaide Advertiser, had published a disturbing opinion piece by Andrew Bolt—Australia's "most influential columnist." Bolt said that Australia was "being destroyed by waves of immigrants – Chinese, Jews, Vietnamese, Indians, Muslims etc – who refused to assimilate and who, as colonists, treated Australia not as a home but as a hotel." Manne wrote that the publication of Bolt's article, entitled "The Foreign Invasion", in the mainstream media, is a "consequence of the steady and sinister and perilous drift of Australia's national conversation towards a permissible racism. In his article, which was also published in the Gladstone Observer, Bolt blamed the "massive immigration" on "activists, academics and politicians" who promote multiculturalism, which he described as "a policy to emphasise what divides us rather than celebrate what unites."

== Canada ==
There was a backlash against multiculturalism in the 1980s following an influx of refugees from Somalia. News commentators began to refer to "immigrants as "hordes" who stage "floods" and "invasions". Journalist Diane Francis cited a teacher as saying that schools "has been totally disrupted by these invading hordes" of Somalian refugees. It was reported that these new arrivals were "damag[ing] Canadian society and caus[ing] inconvenience for native-born Canadians." Francis predicted that the Somalis would contribute "very little, if anything to Canada in the future."

== France ==
In the spring of 2011, with the European Union deeply divided over immigration, thousands of Tunisian refugees arrived in Lampedusa, Italy fleeing unrest in North Africa. An April 6, 2011 article in L'Express, linked the arrival of the destitute immigrants, with the unexpected success of Jean Raspail's 1973 dystopian novel Le camp des saints, which was on the list of top five bestsellers in France in mid-March. The Camp of the Saints, which described a fictional invasion of France and destruction of Western civilization by a million immigrants from India, was translated into English and first published in New York in 1975. Then President Ronald Reagan received it as a gift in the early 1980s, and according to L'Express, both Reagan and François Mitterrand, were fascinated by the book. Samuel P. Huntington praised it in his 1996 non-fiction Clash of Civilizations. In 2004, William F. Buckley, Jr. called in a "great" novel and compared the fictional invasion in Raspail's novel as a cautionary tale regarding the controversial June 2004 rescue by the crew of the ship Cap Anamur, of "37 freezing and sick African refugees" in the Mediterranean. praised the book in 2004 as "a great novel" that raised questions on how to respond to massive illegal immigration, The Southern Poverty Law Center has condemned it for its anti-immigrant rhetoric.

== Sweden ==
Chloe Colliver, a researcher for the London-based nonprofit, Institute for Strategic Dialogue that "tracks the online spread of far-right extremism", said that Sweden had become, an "enduring centerpiece of the far-right conversation." The August 10 Times article linked the rise of the far-right party Sweden Democrats, which won about 18% of the electorate in the 2018 elections, to a backlash against the rapid increase in the number of immigrants in Sweden since 2015. The message the party spread was that immigrants who had not assimilated were "eviscerating" Sweden's generous social welfare, which is based on the "egalitarian idea of the folkhemmet, the concept that Sweden is a family with citizens that "take care of one another." (Note: According to the August 10 Times article, the Sweden Democrats were established in 1988 by "several Nazi ideologues". Working together, Mattias Karlsson and Jimmie Akesson, transformed the party by purging Neo-Nazis, and announcing a ""zero tolerance" policy toward extreme xenophobia and racism.")

== United States ==
The inventor Samuel Morse (1791–1872) used imagery of an invading army of immigrants in a series of articles he wrote under the pen name "Brutus" that were first published in the New York Observer—then owned by his brother. In 1835, the articles were compiled and published in the book Foreign Conspiracy against the Liberties of the United States. Morse said that immigration had undermined the American character. In 1834 Samuel Morse had joined his fellow New Yorkers and many other Americans, in the growing anti-immigration, anti-Catholic nativist movement. He wrote that the impoverished and illiterate Catholic immigrants from Germany, Ireland, and Italy, who, he said, gave their full allegiance to the Pope, posed a threat to American Protestantism and the "American way of life." Morse ran and lost in a bid to become mayor of the New York Nativist Party. Morse called on "every citizen who values his birthright" to repel "this insidious invasion of the country" by the Catholics. Morse wrote that, "Must we wait for a formal declaration of war? The serpent has already commenced his coil about our limbs, and the lethargy of his poison is creeping over us. ...The house is on fire ." To Morse, "monarchy and Catholicism were inseparable and unacceptable, if democracy was to survive."

The title of the 27 August, 1873 San Francisco Chronicle article, "The Chinese Invasion! They Are Coming, 900,000 Strong", was traced by The Atlantic as one of the root causes of the spread in the late 2010s of "immigration invasion" rhetoric. The United States federal law, the 1882 Chinese Exclusion Act, was the first law that excluded a specific ethnic or national group from immigrating to the United States. Through a series of legislation over many decades—the Chinese Exclusion Repeal Act, Immigration and Nationality Act of 1952, Immigration and Nationality Act of 1965—which overturned the National Origins Formula, it was completely repealed.

"Into the lower levels of the American community there pours perpetually a vast torrent of strangers, speaking alien tongues, inspired by alien traditions, for the most part illiterate peasants and working-people. They come in at the bottom: that must be insisted upon. An enormous and ever-increasing proportion of the laboring classes, of all the lower class in America, is of recent European origin, is either of foreign birth or foreign parentage. The older American population is being floated up on the top of this influx, a sterile aristocracy above a racially different and astonishingly fecund proletariat. (For it grows rankly in this new soil. One section of immigrants, the Hungarians, have here a birth-rate of forty-six in the thousand, the highest of any civilized people in the world.) Few people grasp the true dimensions of this invasion. Figures carry so little. The influx has clambered from half a million to 700,000, to 800,000; this year the swelling figures roll up as if they mean to go far over the million mark. The flood swells to overtake the total birth-rate; it has already over-topped the total of births of children to native-American parents."

— H. G. Wells. 1906 Chapter IX. "The immigrant: the Flood" The Future in America: A Search After Realities.

Frank Julian Warne's 1912 book entitled The Immigrant Invasion concerned the arrival to the U.S. of one million new immigrants—"oppressed populations of Europe without land or access to it". Warne began with excerpts from recent works about conquering invaders by Arthur Conan Doyle and H. G. Wells. In Arthur Conan Doyle's 1910 series of essays, Through the Mist, he described the "three great invasions of history", the coming of the Huns to the Roman world, the Saxons to Britain, and the Muslim conquest of the Levant. In his 1906 book The Future in America: A Search After Realities, H. G. Wells warned Americans that they were not sufficiently aware of the threat of the invasion by newly arrived immigrants who were not assimilating and were living in "foreign cities within an American city".

In the 1920s there was a convergence of "rising economic inequality", "new currents of scientific racism, xenophobia, and conservative ideology" that led to new immigration policies in the United States. The national origin quota acts—the 1921 Emergency Quota Act and the 1924 Immigration Act—were intended to reduce the number of immigrants in general, and to limit the number of immigrants who were considered to be "unassimilable." This included immigrants from Southern and Eastern Europe, Russian Jews, and Polish and Italian Catholics.

From 1907 through 1930, about 150,000 Filipinos who were responding to the American need for inexpensive labor in the agricultural industry, made the 7,000 mile journey to the United States, according to a 2019 NPR article. In the early 20th century, it was relatively easy for Filipinos to immigrate, because the Philippine Islands—which had been a Spanish colony for centuries—became a territory of the United States and was put under American military control from the end of the 1898 Spanish–American War until 1946, when the U.S. declared the independence of the republic of the Philippines. The arrival of so many immigrants at once—mainly "single young men"—raised some concerns of an "invasion" which was reflected in the title of a 1920 article in the Los Angeles Times entitled "The Filipino Invasion". The author of the article described the young Filipino men as "good boys, most of them trained on battleships or as houseboys to neatness, cleanliness and quiet courtesy." In response to white workers, angered that Filipinos were taking their jobs, the 1934 Tydings–McDuffie Act was passed, which "capped Filipino immigration at 50 people per year" and reclassified Filipinos in the U.S., who had been considered to be "noncitizen nationals", as "aliens." In 1935 President Franklin D. Roosevelt signed a 1935 law in an effort to repatriate Filipinos already in the United States.

The Immigration and Nationality Act of 1965, which was intended to "purge immigration law of its racist legacy," created a "shift in the composition of immigration away from Europe toward Asia and Latin America" and resulted in a "substantial increase in the number of immigrants", according to 2012 article in the journal Population and Development Review. (Note: The 1965 Immigration and Nationality Act of 1965 repealed the 1920s national origins quotas. The Quota Acts of 1921 and 1924 were intended to reduce the number of immigrants in general and more specifically to limit the number of immigrants who were considered to be "unassimilable." This included immigrants from Southern and Eastern Europe, Russian Jews, and Polish and Italian Catholics.)

The "rise of the Latino threat narrative" in the 1970s, and the use of both marine and martial metaphors by immigration agencies, officials, mass media and writers to describe the arrival of Latino immigrants, coincided with the termination of the Bracero program, which had operated as a farm laborer program from 1942 until 1964, the 2012 study also reported. With the increase in the number of illegal Latino immigrants coming to the United States from 1965 through the late 1970s, "political activists and bureaucratic entrepreneurs" began to "frame Latino immigration as a grave threat to the nation." This led to a "steady rise of negative portrayals" throughout the 1970s, 1980s, and 1990s in the four major newspapers in the United States, The New York Times, The Washington Post, The Wall Street Journal, and the Los Angeles Times. According to the 2012 study, at first, the metaphors used to describe this immigration "crisis" were "marine metaphors", such as a "rising tide", a "tidal wave" that would "inundate" the United States and "drown" its culture while "flooding" American society with unwanted foreigners. Increasingly, the media began to use "martial imagery" to describe illegal immigration as an "invasion". Border Patrol agents were described as being "outgunned" while attempting to "hold the line" and "defend" the US/Mexico border against "attacks" from "alien invaders"' "attacks". Immigrants were described as launching "banzai charges" to overwhelm American defenses." (Note: The 2012 study, used Proquest Historical Newspaper Files, to search for paired words "undocumented," "illegal," or "unauthorized" with "Mexico", "Mexican immigrants", "crisis," "flood," and "invasion.")

The New York Times reported that Cordelia Scaife May (1928–2005), who inherited the Mellon family fortune, was "the most important donor to the modern anti-immigration movement". She funded anti-immigration groups such as the Center for Immigration Studies, the American Immigration Control Foundation, Californians for Population Stabilization, the California Center for Immigration Reform, Numbers USA, and ProEnglish. Through her Colcom Foundation, even after her death, "her money still funds the leading organizations fighting to reduce migration." The Times discovered in her letters and correspondence how the "language she used — about the threat of an 'immigrant invasion', for instance, and environmental strain — echoes in [the] anti-immigration rhetoric" of the late 2010s.

While the act of entering the United States without documentation is a misdemeanor and not a felony, the Immigration and Naturalization Service (INS) Border Patrol agents began to use the term "illegal alien" early in the 1970s. Undocumented immigrants were thereby criminalized giving the INS, through its agencies and agents, the right to apprehend and deport people for being illegally present. A December 19, 1972 New York Times used the phrase "illegal Mexican alien in an article that described the complex socio-economic reality of life on the Texas/Mexico border where many Texans had depended on inexpensive Mexican workforce for decades. By 1972, Immigration and Naturalization Service (INS) Border Patrol agents were allegedly allowing thousands of illegal aliens from Mexico to enter Texas to work on "ranches and businesses operated" by their "hunting and drinking friends" according to the Times. The Times article said that illegal Mexican aliens were "commonly known as 'wetbacks' or more simply as 'wets'".

Leonard F. Chapman, then Commissioner of the Immigration and Naturalization Service (INS) published a 1976 article entitled "Illegal aliens: Time to call a halt!" in Reader's Digest. Chapman wrote that, in 1973, when he became the INS commissioner, "we were out-manned, under-budgeted, and confronted by a growing, silent invasion of illegal aliens. Despite our best efforts, the problem—critical then—now threatens to become a national disaster."

According to political scientist Cas Mudde, Patrick Buchanan, whose nativist books are bestsellers, is the most prominent writer on "alien invasions" of the United States. Buchanan ran in the presidential campaign in 2000 on a platform of immigration restriction. In his 2006 book, State of Emergency: The Third World Invasion and Conquest of America, he wrote that Mexico was "slowly but steadily taking back the American Southwest". American nativists call this the "Aztlan Plot" in reference to the Mexican efforts to recapture "la reconquista" territory they lot lands during the (1846—1848) Mexican–American War campaigns. In State of Emergency, Buchanan wrote that, "If racism means a belief in the superiority of the white race and its inherent right to rule other peoples, American history is full of such men...Indeed, few great men could be found in America or Europe before World War II who did not accept white supremacy as natural." He compares the immigrant invasion by those coming through the Mexico/United States border "to the barbarian invasions that ended the Roman Empire". He said that unless Americans stop the invasion, by 2050, the United States would be "a country unrecognizable to our parents". It would become "the Third World dystopia that Theodore Roosevelt warned against when he said we must never let America become a 'polyglot boardinghouse' for the world."

A 1977 Washington Post article traced the current anti-immigration campaign to the rise of the zero population growth (ZPG) movement in the 1960s–a movement co-founded by three men, including Stanford University Professor Paul Ehrlich, who co-wrote the influential 1968 best-selling book The Population Bomb with his wife Anne Ehrlich, who was uncredited. According to a 2009 Electronic Journal of Sustainable Development (EJSD) (Note: The Thomson Reuters Master Journal List of scientific publications does not include the Electronic Journal of Sustainable Development. EJSD editors have included Indur Goklany, who and Julian Morris. Michael De Alessi of the Reason Foundation, Benny Peiser, Ian Castles, Pierre Desrochers, Paul Reiter, Sir Alan Peacock, and Bruce Yandle have served on the EJSD editorial board.) article by the authors, written forty years after the book's original publication, they had sold about 2 million copies and the book had been translated into a number of different languages. They said that their publication continued to be relevant in terms of the "environmental, energy, and food crisis" in 2009.The Post reported that Paul R. Ehrlich, who was ZPG's honorary president, had signed the ZPG foundation's 1977 nationwide fund-raising appeal, a campaign in the United States that was intended to "generate public support for sharp cuts on both legal and illegal immigration to the United States." The appeal said that "illegal immigration" was a "human tidal wave". It said these "illegal aliens" were "depressing our economy and costing American taxpayers an estimated $10 billion to $13 billion a year in lost earnings and taxes, in welfare benefits and public services."

John Tanton who served as president of Zero Population Growth for several years, co-authored the book The Immigrant Invasion with Wayne Lutton, published by the Social Contract Press in 1994.

Central American migrant caravans—which refer to groups of migrants travelling together from the Northern Triangle of Central America (NTCA) to the Guatemala–Mexico border hoping to cross the Mexico–United States border—became a major Republican issue in 2018 mid-term elections. The day before the November 6 election, Fox News and Fox Business mentioned the term "caravan" 86 times compared to several days after the election, when they mentioned it only 23 times. The caravan they referred to was the largest so far. It had begun in Honduras with migrants starting to walk on October 13 hoping to escape poverty and violence in their own countries, by immigrating to the United States. By October 18 there were about 3000 migrants in the caravan. By October 16, Fox & Friends were focusing on the caravan as an election issue. On Twitter early on the morning of October 18, President Trump threatened to close the border and to use military force to prevent the caravan from entering the United States. He called on Mexico to "stop this onslaught." The CBC reported that Trump had "seized on the migrant caravan to make border security a political issue and energize his Republican base" just 3 weeks before the elections. On the October 18, 2018 Tucker Carlson Tonight show group of panelists panel discussed the use of military troops to prevent the caravan from crossing the border. Tucker Carlson said that, "I guess I'm not hesitant to acknowledge the human cost. I'm struck by your hesitance to acknowledge the over 50,000 Americans who died last year of drug ODs. Where do they figure into this moral equation of yours where we deserve to be invaded because we take their drugs? What about the families of the 50,000 who died? How much time do you spend thinking about them?" From then onwards, during the month of October alone, Fox News used the term "invasion"—in reference to this caravan—over 60 times and Fox Business used it over 75 times. Newt Gingrich October 19 Fox News article said that the "caravan of about 4,000 migrants" was "attempting to invade and attack the U.S." The man accused of the October 27, 2018 Pittsburgh synagogue shooting, who killed eleven people and injured six, had repeated the immigrant invasion rhetoric used by President Trump, other Republicans, Fox News and Fox Business, to describe this caravan—which at that time was "still hundreds of miles south of the U.S. border" according to David Folkenflik in his October 30 NPR article. Laura Ingraham on The Ingraham Angle criticized other media outlets for their "sympathetic overwrought coverage of this invading horde." Steve Doocy said on Fox & Friends said that he was receiving email from people who said it was not a "caravan" but an "invasion." Conservative pundit Michelle Malkin said that, "It is a full-scale invasion by a hostile force, and it requires our president and our commander in chief to use any means necessary to protect our sovereignty."

In 2018, there was a spike in the use of terms that demonized immigrants on CNN and MSNBC "almost exclusively in the context of reporting how leading conservatives had been using such language", according to an analysis undertaken by the New York Times and reported in an August 11, 2019 article. The Times examined the last five years of Fox News, CNN, and MSNBC transcripts, to quantify the number of times terms, such as "invasion" and "replacement", (Note: See also replacement rhetoric, remigration, Go back where you came from) were used and to establish whether "hosts and guests spoke in their own words or reported on the language of others".

An August 4, 2019 article in The Washington Post said that, after the 2019 El Paso shooting, there has been much debate over whether the use of immigrant invasion rhetoric by the current President of the United States, had influenced the shooter, whose alleged manifesto was entitled the "Hispanic invasion of Texas".

The Times reported that American media outlets had "rarely used" immigrant invasion rhetoric prior to 2018. However, the use of words like "invaders" or "invasion" has surged in 2018 following the heavy news coverage of the 2018 arrival at the United States/Mexico border of the first groups of migrants from Central American. There were references to an immigrant "invasion" on over 300 Fox News broadcasts." In "prominent conservative media", including Fox News programs and Rush Limbaugh shows, invasion rhetoric became "increasingly" a regular part of broadcasts.

Three books Fast Food Nation, published in 2001, The Chain: Farm, Factory, and the Fate of our Food, published in 2014, and Scratching Out a Living: Latinos, Race, and Work in the Deep South published in 2016, concluded that what "Trump has described as an immigrant 'invasion' was actually a corporate recruitment drive for poor, vulnerable, undocumented, often desperate workers," according to The Atlantic.
