= 2004 Arizona Proposition 200 =

Referendum on election procedures

Proposition 200
- November 2, 2004
- Arizona Taxpayer and Citizen Protection Act

Results
Choice	Votes	%
Yes	1,041,741	55.64%
No	830,467	44.36%
Total votes	1,872,208	100.00%
County results
For
60–70%
50–60%
Against
60–70%
50–60%

Proposition 200, the "Arizona Taxpayer and Citizen Protection Act", was an Arizona state initiative passed in 2004 that requires: (a) persons to provide proof of citizenship to register to vote; (b) voters to present a photo identification before receiving a ballot at the polling place; and (c) state and local agencies to verify the identity and eligibility, based on immigration status, of applicants for non-federally mandated public benefits. The proposition also makes it a misdemeanor for public officials to fail to report violations of U.S. immigration law by applicants for those public benefits and permits private lawsuits by any resident to enforce its provisions related to public benefits. The requirement to provide proof of citizenship to register to vote was later ruled invalid in federal court.

Authors of the ballot measure, the "Protect Arizona Now" committee, claimed that the provision of state identification and public benefits to individuals without adequately verifying their immigration status gave rise to opportunities for voter fraud and imposed economic hardship on the state.

Opponents of the ballot measure asserted that it was anti-immigrant and reminiscent of California's 1994 Proposition 187, as well as disputed the existence of voter fraud and argued that immigrants were important contributors to the state's economy.

== Proponents ==
Two separate, rival groups supported Proposition 200. The first group was the proposition's sponsor, the Protect Arizona Now (PAN) committee, led by Kathy McKee and supported at the national level by the Carrying Capacity Network (CCN) and Population-Environment Balance (PEB). The second group was the Yes on 200 committee, led by Rusty Childress, a Phoenix-area car dealer, and supported at the national level by the Federation for American Immigration Reform (FAIR). There was a split within PAN, which McKee described as an "attempted hijacking of a local effort by greedy, out-of-state interests"; this split highlighted an ongoing feud within the immigration reduction movement between FAIR and the other two groups dating back to at least 2003, with CCN and PEB issuing frequent statements accusing FAIR (as well as NumbersUSA) of being "reform lite" and "undermining real immigration reform."

PAN was formed by McKee and Childress, who became its chair and treasurer, respectively. The PAN National Advisory Board was chaired by Dr. Virginia Abernethy, and included Dr. David Pimentel and Marvin Gregory. Childress later joined a separate effort, Yes On 200, organized by FAIR.

During the signature gathering campaign, McKee accused Childress of withholding funds and petitions from PAN and fired him. Childress sued McKee over custody of PAN's signatures and funds, but the court ruled in favor of McKee. Childress and the two most prominent supporters of the initiative within the Arizona state legislature, Russell Pearce and Randy Graf, then formed a separate organization, Yes On 200, which was funded almost entirely by out-of-state interests.

When FAIR began an independent signature gathering campaign to collect the remaining signatures needed to put the initiative on the ballot, McKee accused FAIR of attempting a hostile takeover of PAN. When McKee named Abernethy, an avowed "ethnic separatist," as the chair of PAN's national advisory board, FAIR responded by issuing a press release calling for both McKee and Abernethy to resign from PAN and saying that Abernethy's views were "repugnant, divisive and do not represent the views of the vast majority of Arizonans who support Proposition 200." Abernethy's appointment drew harsh criticism from an anti-bigotry group based in Chicago, which noted her "leadership roles in other extremist organizations," such as The Occidental Quarterly and the Council of Conservative Citizens.

== Campaign ==
On July 5, 2004, Protect Arizona NOW's Chairman, Kathy McKee, pursuant to Arizona law, submitted 190,887 signatures to the Arizona Secretary of State's office, surprising critics, who had believed organizers would not be able to garner enough signatures before the deadline. A counter-organization, the Statue of Liberty Coalition, was formed to block Proposition 200, claiming the initiative was racist and would violate Latino civil rights. Opposition to Proposition 200 was bipartisan, including Senator John McCain (R), Senator Jon Kyl (R), Governor Janet Napolitano (D), the Arizona Republican Party, the Green Party, the Libertarian Party, and the AFL-CIO. Tamar Jacoby, a writer on immigration-related issues in articles for The Wall Street Journal and the Los Angeles Times.

Supporters partly relied for justification on a 2004 FAIR study that estimated that Arizona taxpayers were annually paying $1 billion to cover the education, uncompensated health care, and incarceration costs of illegal immigration, net of the taxes paid by the illegal immigrants. This study appeared to contradict a 2003 study performed by a team at the Thunderbird School of Global Management and sponsored by Wells Fargo and the Consul General of Mexico in Phoenix, which estimated that immigrants were annually contributing $318 million more in income and sales taxes than they were costing the state in services and uncompensated health care. However, it was not clear whether that estimate was based on all immigrants or only illegal immigrants.

In November 2004, the electorate passed Proposition 200, with 56% of voters voting in the affirmative. Exit polls found that 47% of Latino voters voted in favor of the initiative.

== Implementation ==
A substantial legal battle erupted over the precise definition of "public benefits." Arizona's Attorney General ruled that the law pertains to only discretionary state programs. Federally funded entitlements like food stamps and subsidized school lunches are examples of public benefits to which, given the Attorney General's finding, the new law would not apply. PAN interpreted the proposition to apply the welfare portion of the initiative to the nearly 60 programs contained in Arizona Revised Statutes Title 46, "Welfare."

Despite withstanding three pre-election and two post-election lawsuits, at least one lawsuit related to Proposition 200 is still pending. "Yes on 200" filed a post-election lawsuit, initially dismissed in the lower court but currently on appeal, saying that the Attorney General overstepped his bounds when he narrowed the definition of "public benefits."

On December 23, 2004, the federal appeals court in Tucson removed an earlier restraining order that had kept the state from implementing the law. The entire law, with one exception, is in effect, using the definition of "public benefits" promulgated by the Governor and Attorney General. State, county, and city workers may be fined up to $700 for each instance in which they provide such benefits to persons who cannot produce evidence of citizenship.

Kathy McKee has since started a new group, Protect America NOW, to support similar initiatives in other states.

== Voter registration and identification at the polls ==
Proposition 200 required, among other things, proof of citizenship to register to vote and voter identification at the polling place. No major elections took place after its adoption before November 7, 2006, and the actual implementation of these two provisions of the proposition remained unclear. Opponents challenged the constitutionality of these requirements upon voters, arguing that such a law could be used to discriminate against ethnic groups, thus violating the Fourteenth Amendment.

On October 5, 2006, the United States Court of Appeals for the Ninth Circuit temporarily suspended these requirements, a little over a month before the election. However, the ruling was stayed fifteen days later by the U.S. Supreme Court.

In October 2010, the Ninth Circuit held that the requirement to provide proof of citizenship to register to vote is invalid as preempted by the National Voter Registration Act of 1993 (NVRA) and that the requirement to provide voter identification at the polling place is valid. However, in April 2011, the court granted Arizona's petition for en banc review of this ruling, and it heard oral arguments on June 21, 2011.

In April 2012, the en banc court also held that the requirement to provide proof of citizenship to register to vote is invalid as preempted by the NVRA and that the requirement to provide voter identification at the polling place is valid. The Supreme Court of the United States declined to stay the ruling on June 28, 2012.

In July 2012, Arizona submitted to the Supreme Court a petition for writ of certiorari to review the Ninth Circuit's ruling that the state's proof of citizenship requirement is preempted by the NVRA. The Court granted the petition in October 2012, and it heard oral arguments on March 18, 2013. On June 17, 2013, the Supreme Court affirmed, in a 7–2 vote with Justice Antonin Scalia delivering the Court's opinion, the Ninth Circuit's ruling that Arizona's proof of citizenship requirement is preempted by the NVRA.
