= Coalition for the Future American Worker =

The Coalition for the Future American Worker is an umbrella coalition of organizations in America that claim that current immigration policies are harming American workers. It includes professional trade groups and grassroots citizens organizations and has run advertisements in several states, including Pennsylvania. Its spokesman is Roy Beck, who is also the founder of NumbersUSA.

== Reception ==
In 2004, the CFAW was condemned for running ads during a congressional election that accused immigrants of abusing the U.S. healthcare system and filling up public schools. The editorial board of the Dallas Morning News called the ads "racially tinged". Both the incumbent Democrat, Rep. Martin Frost, and his Republican challenger called on the CFAW to pull the ads, which Frost said came from "third-party shadow groups with a long history of spewing inaccurate and hateful messages cluttering the airwaves." The Southern Poverty Law Center reported that Frost called the ads "racist." CFAW spokesman Ira Mehlman said the ads informed voters about the legislation sponsored by Frost that would grant amnesty to over a million illegal aliens in Texas and import 250,000 more workers, driving down wages.

FactCheck.org reported that controversial ads CFAW ran in Iowa that same year were regarded as "factually accurate," even by those who opposed their message. The author of a study cited in the ad complained about its use in what he called "borderline racist, anti-immigration advertisements."
