= Philip Kent =

Philip Kent may refer to:

- Phil Kent (born 1951), American media and public relations consultant
- Philip I. Kent, American media executive
- Philip Kent, fictional patriarch of the Kent family in The Kent Family Chronicles

== See also ==
- Philip Kent Grey, 7th Earl Grey (born 1940), British pilot and hereditary peer
