= Benjamin Zuckerman =

American astrophysicist

- Born: August 16, 1943 (age 83); New York City, New York, U.S.
- Education: Massachusetts Institute of Technology; Harvard University
- Awards: Helen B. Warner Prize for Astronomy (1975)
- Scientific career
- Fields: Astrophysics
- Workplaces: University of California, Los Angeles

Benjamin Michael Zuckerman (born August 16, 1943) is an American astrophysicist and environmentalist, and an emeritus professor in the Department of Physics & Astronomy at UCLA. His recent work focusses primarily on the formation and evolution of planetary systems around various types of stars. Zuckerman was a member of the board of directors of the Sierra Club from 2002 to 2005 and the Sea Shepherd Conservation Society from 2002 to 2013. He was an advocate for U.S. population stabilization, demonstrated by his co-founding of the internal Sierra Club group Sierrans for U.S. Population Stabilization and his Presidency of the non-profit organization Californians for Population Stabilization (CAPS) until its merger with NumbersUSA in 2025. Both groups argued for immigration and fertility levels that would enable the U.S. population to stabilize, thereby helping to protect the U.S. environment.

== Education ==
Zuckerman completed two degrees in 1963, one in Physics and one in Aeronautic & Astronautics at Massachusetts Institute of Technology. He finished his PhD thesis in Astronomy in 1968 at Harvard University.

== Publications ==
Since 1965, Zuckerman has published well over 200 refereed papers in journals such as Astrophysical Journal, Nature, Astronomy & Astrophysics and Science. He also produced a number of review papers in the Annual Review of Astronomy and Astrophysics. In 2001, he contributed to the Encyclopedia of Astronomy and Astrophysics.

Zuckerman was co-author of a 2008 paper reporting first directly imaged multiplanetary system (arguably, the first directly imaged planets) around HR 8799 and a 2010 paper discovering a fourth imaged planet in the system: HR 8799 e.

In 1982 Zuckerman co-edited the book Extraterrestrials, Where Are They? with Michael Hart, a known white nationalist. In 1996 he also co-authored the book The Origin and Evolution of the Universe with Matthew A. Malkan and co-edited the book Human Population and the Environmental Crisis with David Jefferson, following a public symposium of the same name held at UCLA in October 1993.
