= ProEnglish =

American nonprofit lobbying organization

- Formation: 1994
- Type: American nationalism Anti-Mexican sentiment Anti-Hispanic sentiment Anti-Spanish sentiment
- Headquarters: 20 F Street NW, 7th Floor
- Location: Washington, D.C.
- Website: www.proenglish.org

ProEnglish is an American nonprofit lobbying organization that is part of the English-only movement. The group supports making English the only official language of the United States. The group has also campaigned against immigration reform and bilingual education.

The Southern Poverty Law Center (SPLC) and Anti-Defamation League, which track extremist groups in the United States, identify the group as an anti-immigrant group. The SPLC designated the organization as a hate group.

== Founding and leadership ==
The group was founded in 1994 as English Language Advocates. The group was established by John Tanton, a leading figure in the anti-immigration movement, along with several of his associates from the organization U.S. English, from which Tanton had resigned after a controversy over racially-charged memos that he had written. The organization is part of Tanton's broader "loose-knit" network of anti-immigration organizations; others include Californians for Population Stabilization, the Center for Immigration Studies, NumbersUSA, and Social Contract Press. As of 2015, ProEnglish "is one of the few remaining groups in Tanton's network in which he remains actively involved." ProEnglish is a project of US Inc., a Petoskey, Michigan-based 501(c)(3) group that is also part of the Tanton network. Dr. Tanton died in July 2019.

The group was originally based in Arlington, Virginia, where it shared office space with NumbersUSA. Its headquarters are now located in Washington, D.C. Robert D. Park was the first chair of the group. Later, Rosalie Pedalino Porter became chair of the group.

The group's former executive directors are K.C. McAlpin and Robert "Bob" Vandervoort. In 2016, Sam Pimm, former executive director of Young Americans for Freedom and former executive director of a pro-Ben Carson super PAC, became executive director of the group. Subsequently, Stephen D. Guschov, a lawyer who formerly worked at Liberty Counsel, became executive director of the group.

== Beliefs and activities ==
Map of US official language status by state before 2016. Blue: English declared the official language; light-blue: 2 official languages, including English; gray: no official language specified.

ProEnglish has been a major part of the "English-as-official-language movement." The group also has opposed comprehensive immigration reform. The chief purpose of the organization at the time of its founding was to defend the Arizona "Official English" ballot initiative, which was adopted in 1988, overturned by the Arizona Supreme Court in 1998, and re-enacted in revised form by Arizona voters in 2006. The group has also supported federal English-only legislation, specifically the English Language Unity Act. In addition to seeking the enactment of laws and policies declaring English to be the official language, ProEnglish "seeks to end bilingual education, repeal federal mandates for the translation of government documents and voting ballots in languages other than English." Among ProEnglish's key priorities is the rescission of Executive Order 13166, an executive order signed by President Bill Clinton which states that any entity that receives federal funds "must provide whatever services it offers in any foreign language spoken by anyone likely to receive those services." ProEnglish also opposes Puerto Rican statehood unless Puerto Rico were to adopt English as its official language.

The group's reported ties to the white nationalist movement have drawn scrutiny. The Anti-Defamation League wrote in 2014 that the group had a "nativist agenda and xenophobic origins and ties." Robert Vandervoort of Illinois, the former executive director of ProEnglish, was head of the Chicagoland Friends of American Renaissance, the racist magazine led by Jared Taylor that serves as an outlet for white nationalist ideology. In 2012, ProEnglish hosted a panel discussion at the Conservative Political Action Conference (CPAC) on "The Failure of Multiculturalism," on which one of the panelists was VDARE founder Peter Brimelow. The Southern Poverty Law Center, which tracks extremist groups in the United States, designated the group as a hate group in its 2014, 2015, and 2016 annual reports. The group has dismissed such criticism.

ProEnglish was a major backer of the unsuccessful 2009 Nashville Charter Amendment 1, a local "English First" ballot referendum in Nashville, Tennessee, which would have generally required government communication and publications to be printed in English only. ProEnglish donated $82,500, about 92% of the total amount raised by the referendum's supporters. The referendum was rejected by Nashville voters. In 2012, ProEnglish was the leading force behind a successful effort to make English the official language of Frederick County, Maryland; the county enacted an ordinance closely based on one drafted by the group. However, in 2015, the country repealed the ordinance, marking a defeat for the organization.

In 2013, ProEnglish vocally opposed the comprehensive immigration reform bill sponsored by the "Gang of Eight," a bipartisan group of U.S. senators. ProEnglish carried out a radio ad campaign against U.S. Senator Lindsey Graham, who was part of the Gang of Eight.

In 2014, ProEnglish criticized The Coca-Cola Company for airing a Super Bowl commercial that showed people of different ethnicities singing "America, the Beautiful" in a variety of languages. ProEnglish condemned Coca-Cola (saying the ad fostered "disunity") and urged its supporters to contact the company to express opposition.

=== Litigation history ===
In 2005, ProEnglish was helping pay the legal fees of at least two employers who had an "English-only rule" requiring employees to speak only English while on the job. ProEnglish paid the legal fees of Terri Bennett, a former nursing student at Pima Community College (PCC) in Tucson, Arizona, "who claimed she was wrongly suspended for complaining when fellow students spoke Spanish to one another in class." At trial, the evidence showed that Bennett had called Hispanic classmates "spics, beaners and illegals" and the Spanish language "gibberish." A jury unanimously rejected Bennett's claims, and in 2015 ordered her to pay $111,000 in attorney's fees to PCC.

In 2008, ProEnglish, along with the Pacific Legal Foundation, filed a lawsuit in federal court challenging 2004 U.S. Department of Health and Human Service regulations that required federally funded healthcare providers to provide translation services for patients who do not speak English. The challengers claimed that the regulations were an "illegal intrusion" on healthcare providers. U.S. District Judge Barry Ted Moskowitz dismissed the suit in 2009.

In EEOC v. Kidmans (2005), ProEnglish helped fund the litigation costs of a small drive-in restaurant in Page, Arizona, that was sued by the Equal Employment Opportunity Commission after it refused to retract an English-on-the-job rule. The restaurant said that the rule was adopted to stop "trash talking" in the Navajo language among employees, most of whom are Navajo. The EEOC and the restaurant owners ultimately negotiated a settlement, in which the employers "may require employees to speak English while dealing with the public, but not at other times."

== See also ==
- Federation for American Immigration Reform
- English Plus
