= Phil Kent =

American public relations consultant

- Born: November 24, 1951 (age 74); Auburn, New York
- Occupation: Public relations consultant
- Website: www.philkent.com

Phil Kent, aka Philip A. Kent (born November 24, 1951) is an American media and public relations consultant. Some of Kent's public relations clients include major corporations as well as political organizations. He also was communications director for Fast Auto Loans of Virginia. He is a graduate of the University of Georgia's Henry W. Grady College of Journalism and Mass Communication and served as a 2nd Lieutenant in the U.S. Army and was Honorably Discharged.

Born in the New York city of Auburn, Kent has served as the President of Atlanta-based Phil Kent Consulting Inc. public relations/marketing company from 2003. He is also CEO of the Atlanta-based InsiderAdvantage Georgia Internet news agency and co-publishes JAMES magazine. His current articles/columns can be found at InsiderAdvantage. He frequently appears on national news and talk radio as a media commentator. Kent is the author of the books The Dark Side of Liberalism and Foundations of Betrayal: How the Liberal Super-Rich Undermine America

Kent also served as press secretary and public affairs advisor to South Carolina Senator Strom Thurmond between 1981 and 1982 and worked for The Augusta Chronicle for 25 years. In 1997 Kent was appointed to an indigent defense board but declined the appointment. In September 2011 Governor Nathan Deal of Georgia appointed him as a member of the newly created state Immigration Enforcement Review Board, a position he presently holds.

Kent has served as executive director of the American Immigration Control Foundation, a group listed by the Southern Poverty Law Center as an anti-immigrant hate group. He is also a board member of ProEnglish, which also designated a hate group by the Southern Poverty Law Center.

In 2019, Kent was hired by a committee for a city of East Cobb to represent their interests.
