= Roy Beck =

American journalist and author (born 1948)

- Born: Roy Howard Beck; July 12, 1948 (age 78); Marshfield, Webster County; Missouri, United States
- Education: University of Missouri School of Journalism (BJ)
- Notable work: The Case Against Immigration; Back of the Hiring Line
- Title: President & Founder, NumbersUSA
- Spouse: Shirley Anne (Neiger) Beck (m. 1970)
- Children: 2

Roy Howard Beck (born July 12, 1948) is an American author and the founder and president of the anti-immigration advocacy organization NumbersUSA. He is a former Washington, DC bureau chief of Booth Newspapers and an environment-beat newspaper reporter, formerly with The Grand Rapids Press and The Cincinnati Enquirer. Beck was also the Washington, DC editor of John Tanton's white nationalist magazine The Social Contract.

== Career ==
Beck is a graduate of the University of Missouri School of Journalism. He was raised in Marshfield, Missouri and delivered milk and collected cans for pocket money in his youth. During the late 1960s, Beck worked at The Grand Rapids Press and The Cincinnati Enquirer as an environmental journalist. He has claimed that the consequences of population growth on natural resources which became a concern during the 1960s environmental movement led to his interest in immigration. Beck worked as the Washington editor of Social Contract Press, which has been designated as a hate group by the Southern Poverty Law Center.

He left journalism during the 1990s and founded NumbersUSA. Beck has gained notable attention in 1996 via a disputed presentation recorded on a VHS tape where he used gumballs to show that immigration to the United States did not alleviate world poverty, because so many remained impoverished outside of the United States. The conclusion was that the United States should restrict immigration more and help the impoverished where they are, instead of allowing them to migrate to richer countries. David R. Henderson, an economist at Stanford University's Hoover Institution and the Naval Postgraduate School in Monterey, California, noted that Beck makes it seem as if allowing immigration is done at a cost to Americans, but that is not what research on the issue indicates. That same year, Beck authored the book The Case Against Immigration which was released in the lead-up to the 1996 elections in the United States.

The New York Times credited Beck's NumbersUSA organization with applying enough pressure to U.S. Senators to defeat a comprehensive immigration bill in June 2007. He has been described as a "tutor" for U.S. Representative Tom Tancredo on immigration issues. According to The Washington Post, Beck had "been marginalized in Washington as an eccentric figure." He released Back of the Hiring Line in 2021 which focused on if American institutions owe U.S. citizens.

== Bibliography ==
- Beck, Roy Howard (2021). Back of the hiring line : a 200-year history of immigration surges, employer bias, and depression of Black wealth. Arlington, VA: NumbersUSA. ISBN 9781737954705.
- Beck, Roy; Kolankiewicz, Leon (2000). "The Environmental Movement's Retreat from Advocating U.S. Population Stabilization (1970–1998): A First Draft of History". Journal of Policy History. 12 (1): 123–156. doi:10.1353/jph.2000.0001. ISSN 0898-0306. PMID 19530363. S2CID 29819004.
- Beck, Roy Howard (1996). The case against immigration : the moral, economic, social, and environmental reasons for reducing U.S. immigration back to traditional levels (First ed.). New York. ISBN 9780393039153.
