= Otis L. Graham =

American historian (1935–2017)

- Born: Otis Livingston Graham Jr. June 25, 1935; Nashville, Tennessee, US
- Died: November 14, 2017 (aged 82); Westlake Village, California, US

Academic background
- Education: Yale University (BA); Columbia University (PhD)
- Thesis: The Old Progressive and the New Deal (1966)
- Doctoral advisor: Richard Hofstadter; William Leuchtenburg
- Influences: Rexford Tugwell

Academic work
- Discipline: History
- Sub-discipline: American history
- Institutions: University of California, Santa Barbara; University of North Carolina, Chapel Hill; University of North Carolina, Wilmington

Otis Livingston Graham Jr. (1935 – 2017) was an American historian, with a special interest in political history, immigration, and public history.

Born in Nashville, Tennessee, on June 25, 1935, Graham received his BA in history from Yale University in 1957 (he also was a varsity wrestler at Yale). After serving three years as an officer in the US Marine Corps, he earned his PhD in history at Columbia University in 1966 (under Richard Hofstadter and William Leuchtenburg) with a doctoral dissertation entitled The Old Progressive and the New Deal: A Study of the Modern Reform Tradition. He taught at Mount Vernon Seminary and College and then California State University, Hayward, before he joined the Department of History at the University of California, Santa Barbara, in 1966 (the same year as Alfred Gollin). Graham taught there until 1980, when he became Distinguished University Professor at the University of North Carolina, Chapel Hill.

He returned to the history department at the University of California, Santa Barbara, in 1989 and taught there until 1995. From 1990 to 1997 he served as editor of The Public Historian. He then taught at the University of North Carolina, Wilmington, until 2002.

Graham published over 25 books during his career. He also served on the Council of the American Historical Association from 1971 to 1974. Graham was awarded fellowships by the John Simon Guggenheim Foundation, the Woodrow Wilson Center, the National Endowment for the Humanities, and the Center for Advanced Study in the Behavioral Sciences. He became interested in immigration later in his career and served as founding chairman of the Center for Immigration Studies.

He died on November 14, 2017, in Westlake Village, California.

== Selected publications ==
- An Encore for Reform: The Old Progressives and the New Deal (New York: Oxford University Press, 1967).
- Toward a Planned Society: From Roosevelt to Nixon (New York: Oxford University Press, 1976)
- Losing Time: The Industrial Policy Debate (Cambridge, MA: Harvard University Press, 1992).
- Unguarded Gates: A History of America's Immigration Crisis (Lanham, MD: Rowman & Littlefield, 2004)
- Immigration Reform and America's Unchosen Future (Bloomington, IN: AuthorHouse, 2008)
- Presidents and the American Environment (Lawrence: University Press of Kansas, 2015)
