= Nashville Charter Amendment 1 =

2009 referendum

- January 22, 2009
- English is the official language of the Metropolitan Government of Nashville and Davidson County, Tennessee. Official actions that bind or commit the government shall be taken only in the English language, and all official government communications and publications shall be in English. No person shall have a right to government services in any other language. All meetings of the Metro Council, boards, and commissions of the Metropolitan Government shall be conducted in English. The Metro Council may make specific exceptions to protect public health and safety. Nothing in this measure shall be interpreted to conflict with federal or state law.

Results
Choice	Votes	%
Yes	32,144	43.50%
No	41,752	56.50%
Valid votes	73,896	100.00%
Invalid or blank votes	0	0.00%
Total votes	73,896	100.00%

Nashville Charter Amendment 1 of 2009 (also known as the Nashville English Only Amendment or Nashville English First Amendment) was a proposed amendment to the charter of Nashville, Tennessee which, if passed, would have restricted the use of foreign languages in relation to the functions of the city government.

Early voting was held from January 2, 2009 to January 17, 2009. Regular voting was held on January 22, 2009. The amendment failed to pass, with only 43.5% of voters supporting it.

The referendum took place amidst a broader English-only movement in the United States. Most of the funding for the initiative came from the Virginia-based lobbying organization ProEnglish.

== Components ==
Accordingly, there were five components to Proposal 1:

- Declaring an official language of the city and county
- Official actions "taken only" in English; communications and publications in English
- No right to non-English services
- Establishing language of government meetings
- Exceptions for federal law, state law, and specific situations chosen by the Council but only on the grounds of health and safety

Previous efforts to pass this type of legislation had been met with vigorous opposition from then-Nashville Mayor Bill Purcell, who argued that the passage of an ordinance making English the official language of Nashville would create legal confusion, resulting in countless lawsuits. In his statement vetoing the ordinance in February 2007, Purcell said:

If this law takes effect, this city will be engaged in years of lawsuits testing the effect and constitutionality of the ordinance. That means hundreds of thousands of dollars in legal fees whether we win or lose, for no good reason.

Proponents of the proposal referred to it as "English First" while opponents called it "English Only" - each side claimed that the other side's terminology was misleading. The Associated Press called the measure a "foreign language ban."

Supporters of Proposal 1 argued that government communication in only one language is simple and cost-effective and provides an incentive to non-English speakers to learn the language. The proponents of Proposal 1 were represented by Nashville English First, the brainchild of Nashvillians Jon Crisp and Eric Crafton, with the legal, financial, and moral support of ProEnglish out of Arlington, Virginia.

Opponents argued that the measure is antagonistic toward immigrants in transition, redundant in that English was already the "official and legal language" of Tennessee, and that passage of the measure could damage Nashville's reputation as a welcoming city, its international economy, its budget, and its safety. The most formal opposition came from Nashville for All of Us, a coalition of Nashville groups.

== Results ==
The amendment failed to pass, with 41,752 votes opposed (56.5%) and 32,144 votes in support 43.5%.

Nashville Charter Amendment 1
Choice	Votes	%
For	32,144	43.50
Against	41,752	56.50
Total	73,896	100.00
Source: ABC News, NewsChannel 5
