= The Future in America =

1906 book by H. G. Wells

The Future in America: A Search After Realities
- Title page for The Future in America: A Search After Realities (1906)
- Author: H. G. Wells
- Language: English
- Subject: United States
- Genre: Travel literature
- Publisher: Chapman & Hall
- Publication date: October 1906
- Publication place: United Kingdom
- Pages: 259

The Future in America: A Search After Realities is a 1906 travel essay by H. G. Wells recounting his impressions from the first of half-a-dozen visits that he would make to the United States. The book consists of 15 chapters and a concluding "envoy".

Wells describes the United States as "a great and energetic English-speaking population strewn across a continent so vast as to make it seem small and thin ... caught by the upward sweep of that great increase of knowledge that is everywhere enlarging the power and scope of human effort, exhilarated by it, and active and hopeful beyond any population the world has ever seen" engaged in "a universal commercial competition that must, in the end, if it is not modified, divide them into two permanent classes of rich and poor."

Much of the book is devoted to a discussion of American social problems: labour, corruption (through Jane Addams, Wells visited Chicago slums and a corrupt alderman's saloon), immigration (Wells called for either "a gigantic and costly machinery organized to educate and civilize" immigrants or restriction "to numbers assimilable under existing conditions"), "state-blindness" (by which Wells means the typical American's failure to perceive "that his business activities, his private employments, are constituents in a large collective process"), injustice, racial prejudice (he met with Booker T. Washington, rejected the viability of segregation, and praised the "heroic" resolve of black Americans), American universities, Boston's excessive attachment to the past, and the urgent need for democratizing political reform. (Note: Specifically, Wells wrote, "It is necessary to make the Senate and the House of Representatives more interdependent, and to abolish the possibilities of deadlocks between them, to make election to the Senate direct from the people, and to qualify and weaken the power of the two-party system by the introduction of 'second ballots' and the referendum.") The last chapter of the book is devoted to impressions of Theodore Roosevelt, whom he visited at the White House and saw as not only representing the United States but also "a very symbol of the creative will in man," "the creative purpose, the good-will in men." The Future in America concludes with an "envoy" announcing that "in America, by sheer virtue of its size, its free traditions, and the habit of initiative in its people, the leadership of progress must ultimately rest".

== Background ==
Wells's voyage to America took place in the midst of his unsuccessful effort to reform the Fabian Society. He boarded the Carmania on 27 March 1906 and returned to Great Britain on the Cambria on 27 May. Parts of the book were serialized in the Tribune in Britain and in Harper's Weekly in the US from July to October. The volume was published in October 1906. (Note: According to the biographer David C. Smith, the standard source on Wells's visits to the United States is Sylvia Strauss's unpublished PhD thesis H.G. Wells and America (1968).)

== Reception ==
The Future in America was well received in the United States, where Wells "always enjoyed a good reputation, and had occasional strong friendships with those on the American left such as Lincoln Steffens, Ella Winter, Upton Sinclair, and others". In Britain, the book was very successful and was praised by Morley Roberts, Winston Churchill and Beatrice Webb.
