= California Coalition for Immigration Reform =

American immigration reduction advocacy group

California Coalition for Immigration Reform (CCIR) was a Huntington Beach, California-based political advocacy group devoted to immigration reduction, with an emphasis on combating illegal immigration to the United States. According to the organization's website, its objectives were to "promote and expand citizen and legal resident awareness by a practical, effective communication network" and to "mobilize citizens and legal residents to support elected representatives and legislation" who favor immigration reduction.

After the 2013 death of its original leader, Barbara Coe, the group renamed itself the National Council for Issue Reform.

== History ==
The CCIR was founded in 1994 by Barbara Coe, (1933 - 2013) who served as chairwoman of the organization until her death. Of Sioux and European American ancestry, Coe was born and raised on the Pine Ridge Indian Reservation in South Dakota. She was a police clerk who was allegedly using a department camera to photograph people she thought were illegal aliens and was fired .

The CCIR was a co-sponsor of California Proposition 187 (1994), which would have stopped public services such as education to illegal immigrants with public taxmoney. The proposition was approved by the electorate but overturned as unconstitutional by a federal court.

CCIR has sponsored billboards along the Arizona-California border that read, "Welcome to California, the Illegal Immigration State. Don't Let This Happen to Your State."

In 2006, a letter connected to Republican congressional nominee Tan D. Nguyen, was sent to 14,000 Hispanic voters in Orange County. It warned that immigrants who were citizens could not legally vote and may be deported if they did, which was untrue. It was issued on what appeared to be CCIR letterhead. The letter prompted a state and Department of Justice investigation, as it appeared to be trying to dissuade a targeted part of the population from voting. Nguyen said his office had not authorized it. Coe condemned the letter and said her organization had no part in it.

In the spring of 2010, Coe apparently sent an email that was eventually posted to an anti-immigrant list serv, where non-supporters also read it. The email advised supporters to vote for a particular candidate and to "lock and load" and prepare for "the time of reckoning".

In a July 29, 2010, email to supporters, Coe questioned whether Muslim Americans could become assimilated into U.S. society, writing, "However, since muslims subscribe to the teachings of the Koran – which is to torture/kill all non-believers – how do you suggest we ‘Americanize’ those who want us beheaded?” Coe wrote, "My efforts will be to share the TRUTH about these cold-blooded terrorists, urge others to strongly OPPOSE the building of mosques [terrorist training camps], and urge SUPPORT of all efforts to get them DEPORTED to their country of origin where they can commit their barbaric Satanic acts at will.”

Barbara Coe, the founder and chairwoman of California Coalition for Immigration Reform, died on August 31, 2013, at the age of 79. After this, the group renamed itself the National Council for Issue Reform.
