= Edward Schumacher-Matos =

American-Colombian journalist, lecturer and columnist

Edward Schumacher-Matos is an American-Colombian journalist, lecturer and columnist. He served as the ombudsman at NPR from June 2011 to January 2015. He also lectured at the Columbia University Graduate School of Journalism as the James Madison Visiting Professorship before becoming Director of the Edward R. Murrow Center for a Digital World at Tufts University, a graduate program focused on cyberspace and media.

== Life and education ==
Schumacher-Matos was born in Colombia and moved to the United States as a child. At age 21, he received U.S. citizenship. He then volunteered to serve the Army in Vietnam, earning a Bronze Star as recognition for his service. Schumacher-Matos gained his Bachelor of Arts degree in Politics and Literature from Vanderbilt University. He then earned a Master of Arts degree in International Politics and Economics from the Fletcher School of Law and Diplomacy at Tufts University. He participated in a Fulbright Fellowship in Japan.

== Journalism and professorships ==
Schumacher-Matos founded and became the associate publisher of The Wall Street Journal Americas (from 1994 to 2003), editions in Spanish and Portuguese designed for Latin America, Spain and Portugal. He was a reporter for The New York Times and acted as the Madrid bureau chief, the Buenos Aires bureau chief and the New York City reporter on the city's economic development. He was also the founder and editorial director of Meximerica Media and Rumbo Newspapers, from 2003 to 2007. Schumacher-Matos also wrote a syndicated column for The Washington Post. In 2007, he became ombudsman for the Miami Herald and held the position until 2011, when he assumed the role of ombudsman at NPR. From 2008 to 2011, he taught at Harvard University as a Robert F. Kennedy visiting professor of Latin American Studies and as a Shorenstein fellow on the press, politics and public policy. In addition to those positions, he was a lecturer at the John F. Kennedy School of Government.

== Awards and recognition ==
While reporting for The Philadelphia Inquirer, he was part of the staff who won a 1980 Pulitzer Prize for coverage of the Three Mile Island nuclear power plant accident.
