= Tamar Jacoby =

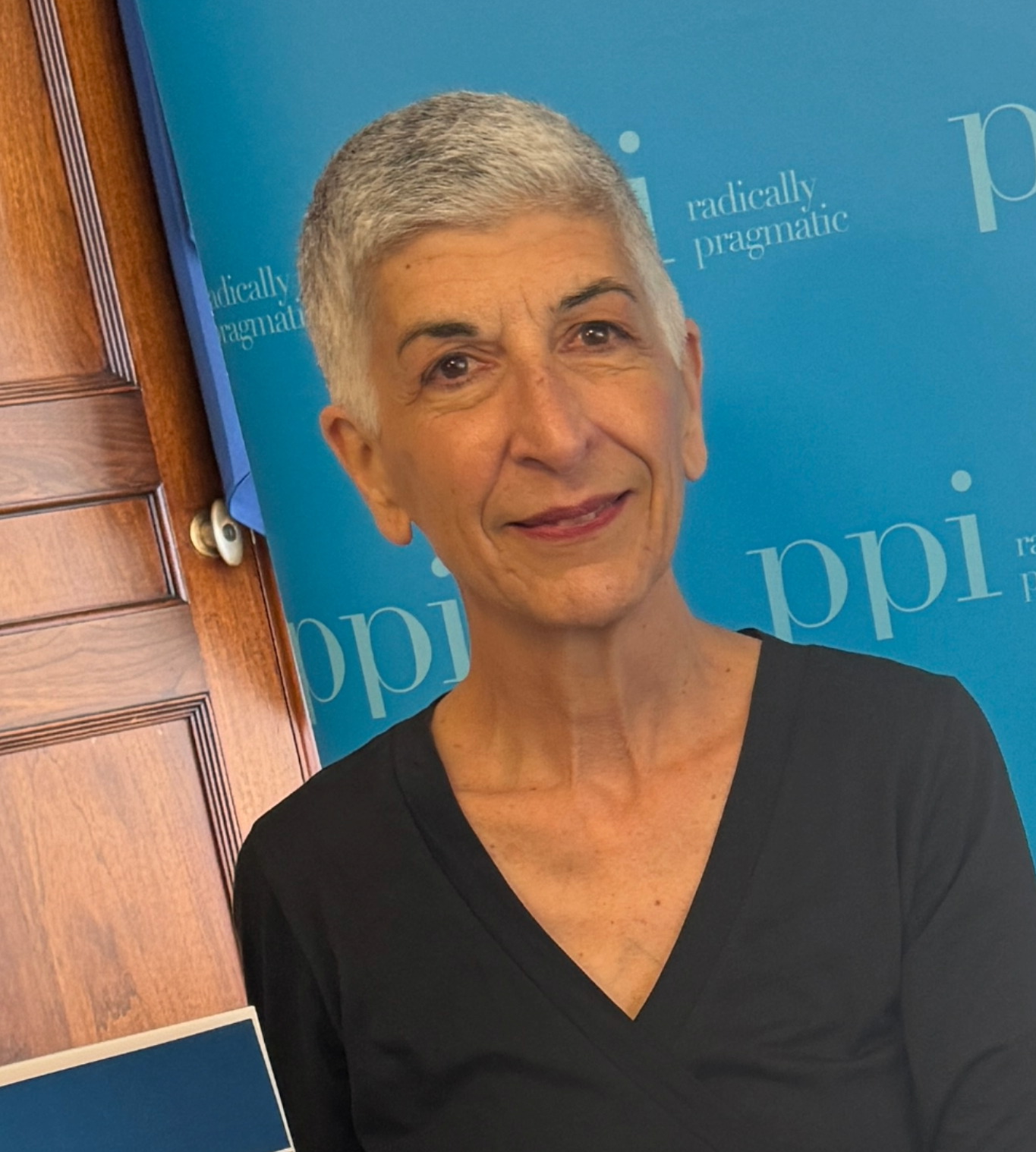
Tamar Jacoby, October 4, 2023

Tamar Jacoby is the director of the Progressive Policy Institute’s New Ukraine Project. The Kyiv-based project is devoted to reporting on the war between Russia and Ukraine, and related political and policy developments in Brussels and Washington, D.C.. Jacoby was formerly president of Opportunity America, a Washington, D.C.-based nonprofit organization working to promote economic mobility – work, skills, careers, ownership and entrepreneurship for poor and working Americans. Before that, she was president of ImmigrationWorks USA, a national federation of small business owners working to advance immigration reform. A former journalist and author, Jacoby was a senior writer and justice editor at Newsweek, and the deputy editor of The New York Times op-ed page.

== Life and career ==
Jacoby was born in New York City, the daughter of Irving Jacoby, a documentary film director and Alberta (née Smith), a university lecturer and filmmaker. Her brother is documentary director Oren Jacoby.

After graduating from Yale University in 1976, Jacoby spent a year in Paris working for the Hudson Institute. In 1977, she became assistant to the editor of the New York Review of Books. From 1981 to 1987, she was the deputy editor of the New York Times op-ed page and, from 1987 to 1989, a senior writer and justice editor at Newsweek. Her articles have appeared in The New York Times, The Wall Street Journal, The Washington Post, Forbes, The Bulwark, Washington Monthly, and Foreign Affairs, among other publications.

Jacoby has taught at New York University, Cooper Union and The New School for Social Research, and also in Connecticut at Yale University.

In 1990, Jacoby devoted herself full-time to an independent writing career. From the early 1990s through 2007, she was a senior fellow at the Manhattan Institute. In 2010-11, she held a Bosch fellowship at the American Academy in Berlin. In 2012-13, she was a Bernard L. Schwartz fellow at New America. From 2004 to 2010, she served on the advisory board of the National Endowment for the Humanities.

Her 1998 book, Someone Else’s House: America’s Unfinished Struggle for Integration (Free Press), tells the story of race relations in three American cities – New York, Detroit and Atlanta.

She founded ImmigrationWorks USA in 2006 and Opportunity America in 2014.

Her edited volumes include Reinventing the Melting Pot: The New Immigrants and What It Means to Be American (Basic Books) and This Way Up: New Thinking About Poverty and Economic Mobility (American Enterprise Institute).

She traveled to Ukraine to write about Putin's invasion in the spring of 2022. The New Ukraine Project, founded in 2023, covers a broad range of topics, including Ukrainian refugees in Europe, Ukrainian public opinion, Ukrainian anticorruption and economic reform, the emerging Ukrainian defense industry, and European rearmament. Jacoby writes about Ukraine and defense for Forbes. Displaced: The Ukrainian Refugee Experience (Talentos Press) is based on interviews with 45 Ukrainians who had moved temporarily to Poland in March 2022.
