= John Tanton =

American white nationalist and anti-immigration activist (1934–2019)

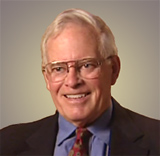
- Tanton in October 2004
- Born: February 23, 1934; Detroit, Michigan, U.S.
- Died: July 16, 2019 (aged 85); Petoskey, Michigan, U.S.
- Education: Michigan State University (BS); University of Michigan (MS, MD)
- Occupations: Ophthalmologist, activist
- Spouse: Mary Lou Tanton

John Hamilton Tanton (February 23, 1934 – July 16, 2019) was an American ophthalmologist, white nationalist, and anti-immigration activist. He was the founder and first chairman of the Federation for American Immigration Reform (FAIR), an anti-immigration organization. He was the co-founder of the Center for Immigration Studies, an anti-immigration think tank; and NumbersUSA, an anti-immigration lobbying group.

In addition, Tanton was the founder and president of the first Planned Parenthood in northern Michigan, and was the co-founder and president of the Audubon Society's Petoskey chapter.

He was chairman of U.S. English and ProEnglish. He was briefly President of Zero Population Growth. He was the founder of The Social Contract Press, which published a quarterly journal of nativist and white nationalist writers called The Social Contract until the fall of 2019. He founded the pro-eugenics organization Society for Genetic Education.

== Early life and career ==
John Hamilton Tanton was born February 23, 1934 in Detroit, Michigan. In 1945, he moved with his family to a farm northeast of Bay City, Michigan, on which his mother had been raised and on which he worked. His mother was a fundamentalist Christian, a member of the Evangelical United Brethren Church. In his youth he played baseball and football.

He studied medicine. Tanton graduated with a bachelor's degree in chemistry from Michigan State University in 1956, received an M.D. from the University of Michigan in 1960, and received an M.S. in ophthalmology from the University of Michigan in 1964. Tanton ran an ophthalmology practice in Petoskey, Michigan.

== Political advocacy ==
Tanton was an anti-immigration activist, and white nationalist. He was the founder and patron of many anti-immigration non-profit organizations, including ProEnglish. By 2019, six anti-immigrant groups founded by Tanton were designated as hate groups by the Southern Poverty Law Center. Tanton complained that he had been smeared as a racist.

Earlier in his advocacy career, he founded the Petoskey chapter of the Sierra Club, helped found the northern Michigan chapter of Planned Parenthood, and became an active member and then president of Zero Population Growth from 1975 to 1977. Unable to gain support from colleagues in groups such as Planned Parenthood and the Sierra Club for his plans to limit immigration, he founded the non-profit Federation for American Immigration Reform (FAIR) in 1979. With early support from Warren Buffett and Eugene McCarthy, he promised that it would be "centrist/liberal in political orientation". Under Tanton's leadership, FAIR was criticized for taking funding for many years from the Pioneer Fund, a non-profit foundation dedicated to "improving the character of the American people" by, among other things, promoting the practice of eugenics, or selective breeding. FAIR responded to this criticism by asserting that the Pioneer Fund clearly states that it supports equal opportunity for all Americans, regardless of race, religion, national origin, or ethnicity; that other major organizations, including universities in the United States and other countries, have also accepted grants from the Fund; and that the Pioneer Fund's contributions to FAIR were used only for the general operation of the organization.

In 1983, he co-founded U.S. English with former United States Senator S. I. Hayakawa to advocate for making English the official language of the United States. In 1988, shortly before a referendum in Arizona to make English the state's official language, a memo written by Tanton in 1986 was leaked to the media. After the memo was published in various newspapers including The Arizona Republic, executive director Linda Chavez resigned. Former supporters of the group, including Walter Cronkite, Saul Bellow, and Gore Vidal, also ended their association, and Tanton resigned from his position as chairman. Both FAIR and Social Contract Press are designated as hate groups by the Southern Poverty Law Center (SPLC). In 2001, the SPLC included these groups, and Tanton, in a list of inter-connected network of anti-immigration groups which espouse bigotry, either openly, or thinly disguised. He also founded the pro-eugenics organization the Society for Genetic Education (SAGE).

Additionally, Tanton co-founded and was heavily involved in the Center for Immigration Studies (CIS), NumbersUSA, the American Immigration Control Foundation, American Patrol/Voices of Citizens Together, Californians for Population Stabilization, and ProjectUSA. Donations flow through U.S. Inc., which also supports Scenic Michigan, the International Dark-Sky Association, the Foreign Policy Association's Great Decisions Series, and the Harbor Springs chapter of the North Country Trail Association. Tanton served on the Board of Population-Environment Balance. Tanton founded the Social Contract Press in 1990. He served as its publisher. Additionally, he was the editor-in-chief of its journal, The Social Contract, since 1998 until the fall of 2019. He co-authored the book The Immigrant Invasion with Wayne Lutton, which was published by the Social Contract Press in 1994.

== Views ==
Tanton's anti-immigration rhetoric combined concerns about ecology and promotion of eugenics; he couched his promotion of these ideas in liberal concerns over sustainability. His views on immigration were influenced by climate and environmental concerns, arguing in the 1980s that climate change would have a major impact on America's borders and lead to conflict. Tanton was for eugenics, the process of "improving the genetic quality of the human population". Tanton wrote a paper in 1975 arguing for "passive eugenics" whereby child-bearing would be restricted to those between the ages of 20 and 35.

Later, his views and statements began to become overtly racist and extremist, and he began to draw close to Jared Taylor, whose books he admired and who was a regular at his conferences. In the words of Rafael Bernal of The Hill, Tanton's opposition to immigration was "on the grounds of population reduction and protection of an ethnic white majority". According to the New York Times, Tanton over time increasingly made his case against immigration in "racial terms". According to the New York Times, Tanton also said "One of my prime concerns is about the decline of folks who look like you and me ... for European-American society and culture to persist requires a European-American majority, and a clear one at that."

Tanton's environmentalist and anti-immigration activities are well-documented in 17 file boxes of archives he donated to the Bentley Historical Library at the University of Michigan. Another 10 file boxes are sealed until 2035. A February 2009 Southern Poverty Law Center report examined Tanton's written correspondence highlighted alleged connections between Tanton's anti-immigration efforts and white supremacist, neo-Nazi and pro-eugenics leaders, calling Tanton the "puppeteer of the nativist movement" with deep racist roots and ties to many white supremacists and eugenicists. Tanton and his organisations spent decades linking immigration to environmental concerns.

Tanton's promotion of such views has been influential, with ProPublica noting influences on Fox News commentator Tucker Carlson, white supremacist Richard Spencer, and Ann Coulter. They noted similar ideas influenced Brenton Tarrant, the perpetrator of the 2019 Christchurch mosque shootings, who murdered 51 people, and the perpetrator of a similar terrorist attack carried out in El Paso a few months later.

== Personal life and death ==
Tanton was married to Mary Lou Tanton, who he met at MSU in 1956. She chairs the U.S. Immigration Reform PAC. She also co-founded Scenic Michigan. Tanton had Parkinson's disease for his last 16 years. He died in Petoskey, Michigan on July 16, 2019.
