= 1994 California Proposition 187 =

Ballot on measures against illegal immigrants

Proposition 187
- November 8, 1994
- Illegal Aliens. Ineligibility for Public Services. Verification and Reporting. Initiative Statue.

Results
Choice	Votes	%
Yes	5,063,537	58.93%
No	3,529,432	41.07%
Valid votes	8,592,969	96.54%
Invalid or blank votes	307,663	3.46%
Total votes	8,900,632	100.00%
Registered voters/turnout	14,723,784	60.45%
County results
Yes
70–80%
60–70%
50–60%
No
70–80%
50–60%

California Proposition 187 (also known as the Save Our State (SOS) initiative) was a 1994 ballot initiative to establish a state-run citizenship screening system and prohibit illegal immigrants from using non-emergency health care, public education, and other services in the State of California. Voters enacted the proposed law at a referendum on November 8, 1994. The law was challenged in a legal suit the day after its passage, and almost all provisions were found unconstitutional by a federal district court on November 11. In July 1999, Governor Gray Davis halted state appeals of this ruling, effectively killing the law.

The enactment of Proposition 187 reflected state residents' concerns about illegal immigration to the United States. Opponents cited the specter of "totalitarianism", finding the initiative unfairly targeted "children and would turn tens of thousands of adults into government informants", while being motivated by bigotry against people of Hispanic or Asian origin; supporters maintained that their concerns were economic: that the state could not afford to provide social services for so many people who had entered the country illegally or overstayed their visas. The California Legislative Analyst's Office later said that the cost of verification would be greater than any fiscal benefits of the ballot measure. As the state's demographics have shifted to include more immigrants, the reversal of Proposition 187 has been cited as a reason for the decline of the California Republican Party.

== Background and passage ==
In 1994, California had an estimated 1.3 million illegal immigrants. Some residents were increasingly concerned about the costs of providing services to undocumented families.

The Republican assemblyman Dick Mountjoy of Monrovia introduced Proposition 187 to the state legislature as the "Save Our State" (SOS) initiative. It gained enough signatures to be placed on the ballot as a statutory initiative during the general election on November 8, 1994. Originally one of several immigration reform bills placed before the California legislature in the early 1990s, polls surveying community responses showed that Proposition 187 began with widespread support—a 37-point lead in July 1994, and 62–29% lead among likely voters by September 1994. Proponents of the bill estimated that California spent $3 billion per year on services for illegal immigrants, about half of which provided education to children of illegal immigrants.

Governor Pete Wilson, a Republican, was a prominent supporter of Proposition 187, which ultimately became a key issue during his 1994 re-election campaign against Democratic opponent Kathleen Brown. After facing record low approval ratings during his first term, Wilson trailed Brown in opinion polls by more than 20% early during the gubernatorial campaign. Commentators considered his aggressive support of the Proposition 187 as crucial to his re-election. In the days leading up to the election, Wilson said that he would require all state and local government employees to report suspected illegal immigrants to the Attorney's General Office if Proposition 187 passed. State Attorney General Dan Lungren, also running for re-election, agreed to enforce emergency regulations to implement the law immediately after the election.

During the 1994 United States Senate election in California campaign, the incumbent Senator Dianne Feinstein and Republican challenger Michael Huffington both adopted tough policies against illegal immigration. The candidates each revealed that they had previously hired illegal immigrants for housekeeping and childcare. Unlike Feinstein, Huffington had hired a housekeeper who was an illegal immigrant after the Immigration Reform and Control Act of 1986, which made it illegal to knowingly hire illegal immigrants. Feinstein was narrowly re-elected.

President Bill Clinton urged Californians to reject Proposition 187 as an impediment to federal policy on immigration. After stating that "it is not wrong for you Californians to want to reduce illegal immigration," Clinton asked voters to allow the federal government to "keep working on what we're doing." In November 1994, Clinton publicly criticized the ballot measure, stating that it "is not the answer" to the issues stemming from illegal immigration. In the days leading up to the ballot measure vote, Latino students organized large protests of Proposition 187 across the state, including a mass boycott of high schools. Their protests often included waving the Mexican flag, a controversial symbol that was described by opponents as counterproductive.

On November 8, 1994, California voters approved the proposition by a wide margin: 59% to 41%. According to the Los Angeles Times exit polls, 63% of non-Hispanic white voters and 23% of Latino voters voted for Proposition 187; African-American and Asian voters were closely divided between those voting for and against the law. Although non-Hispanic whites comprised 57% of California's population at the time, they represented 81% of voters in the 1994 general election. Latinos totaled 8% of voters, although they comprised 26% of the state's population.

Among those who voted on the initiative, 78% of Republicans and 62% of independents voted for it, while 64% of Democrats opposed it.

Section 1 of Proposition 187 provides this introduction:

The People of California find and declare as follows:

That they have suffered and are suffering economic hardship caused by the presence of illegal aliens in this state. That they have suffered and are suffering personal injury and damage caused by the criminal conduct of illegal aliens in this state. That they have a right to the protection of their government from any person or persons entering this country unlawfully.

== Key elements of Proposition 187 ==
Proposition 187 included the following key elements:

1. All law enforcement agents who suspect that a person who has been arrested is in violation of immigration laws must investigate the detainee's immigration status, and if they find evidence of illegality they must report it to the attorney general of California, and to the federal Immigration and Naturalization Service (INS). They must also notify the detainee of his or her apparent status as an alien.
2. Local governments are prohibited from preventing or limiting the fulfillment of this requirement.
3. If government agents suspect anyone applying for benefits of being illegal immigrants, the agents must report their suspicions in writing to the appropriate enforcement authorities.
4. People shall not receive any public social services until verified as a United States citizen or as a lawfully admitted alien.
5. People shall not receive any health care services from a publicly funded health care facility until verified as a United States citizen or as a lawfully admitted alien.
6. A public elementary or secondary school shall not admit or permit the attendance of any child until verified as a United States citizen or as a lawfully admitted alien.
7. By 1996, each school district shall verify the legal status of each child enrolled within the district and the legal status of each parent or guardian of each child.
8. A child who is in violation of the requirements above shall not continue to attend the school 90 days from the date of notice to the attorney general and INS.
9. The attorney general must keep records on all such cases and make them available to any other government entity that wishes to inspect them.
10. The manufacture, distribution, sale, or use of false citizenship or residency documents is a state felony punishable by imprisonment or fine.

== Opposition ==
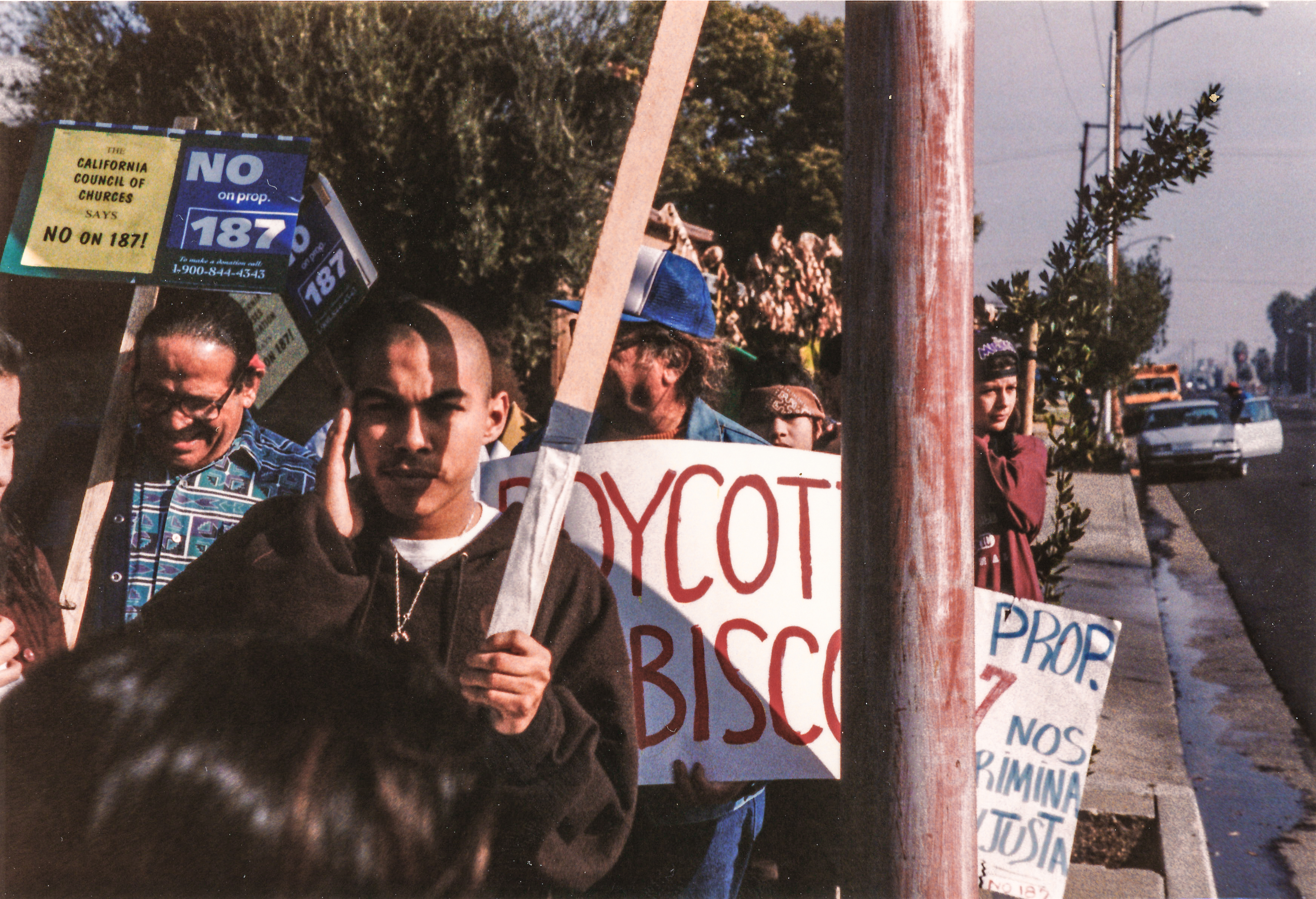
Protesters of Proposition 187 in Fresno, California in 1994

Activists on campuses, churches, and ethnic communities in California and across the country rallied to express opposition to Proposition 187. Critics argued that the measure was xenophobic and discriminated against ethnic minorities, especially those of Latino origin. Others were fearful that the costs of a state-run citizenship screening system and the potential loss of federal funds would off-set any savings of denying public benefits to unlawful residents. The day after the law was approved, an alliance of Latino and civil rights groups, including Mexican American Legal Defense and Educational Fund and American Civil Liberties Union, filed lawsuits against the measure in state court. Multiple local governments outside California, including the city of Denver, Colorado, threatened to boycott the state altogether. Latino organizations announced that they would not hold conventions in California and urged a boycott by their members and supporters of Disneyland, a major tourist attraction.

In the weeks leading up to the election, opponents of Proposition 187 led a series of demonstrations. These events gathered several thousands of people. One of the largest protests of the proposition, as well as one of the largest protests in Los Angeles history, was held on October 16, 1994, when an estimated 70,000 people marched through the downtown area. The line of demonstrators stretched at least a mile long. 2 weeks later, 7,000 people participated in another rally against Proposition 187 that took the form of a concert in which dozens of musicians and speakers performed. Young people, particularly Hispanic students, organized their own protests. Most often, these involved campus walkouts. Students as young as middle schoolers participated. In one of the largest student-led demonstrations against Proposition 187, more than 10,000 young people walked out from more than 30 campuses in the Los Angeles Unified School District. The protest was held without endorsement by any official groups; instead, students had been encouraged to stay in school and stage sit-ins as an alternative.

Due to Proposition 187's statutes requiring children and their parents or legal guardians to prove their legal status, the California State Parent-Teacher Association joined in opposing the bill. The Democratic gubernatorial candidate, Gray Davis, who succeeded Wilson, campaigned against Proposition 187. Proposition 187 was widely supported by conservatives. However, some prominent conservatives, including former Congressman and Secretary of Housing and Urban Development Jack Kemp, former Secretary of Education William Bennett, and unsuccessful Republican gubernatorial candidate Ron Unz, publicly opposed the initiative. The Mexican president, Carlos Salinas de Gortari, decried the law as xenophobic and harmful to the human rights of migrant laborers. One week after the bill was approved, Salinas proposed cross-border discussions to develop a "guest worker" program that would permit non-resident Mexicans to work legally in the United States. Such a program had been in place during World War II.

== Ethnic minority reactions ==
Reactions against the proposition varied between and within different ethnic minority groups. Latino communities are cited as having been the most active; Hispanic students in particular were marked as they marched in the streets with Mexican flags. Some sources claim that this reaction might have caused indecisive voters to vote in favor of the proposition. After the election, Harold Ezell, the former Immigration and Naturalization Service Director who helped author Proposition 187, maintained that the "biggest mistake the opposition made was waving those green and white flags with the snake on it. They should have been waving the American flag." When Hispanic students were criticized for waving Mexican flags during demonstrations in Los Angeles, community leaders responded to the controversy by saying that it was "a symbolic clinging to self-pride". But some movement leaders did attempt to address these criticisms. As the election drew near, organizers sold thousands of American flags at their demonstrations against Proposition 187.

Asian communities in particular were divided: an overall majority of 57% supported the proposition. As the bill became more visible, some Asian communities became increasingly active politically. The Los Angeles Times reported "massive organizing among California's communities of color, particularly the Latino and Asian communities". In fact, the largest organized group in support of Proposition 187 in October 1994 was the Asian Americans for Border Control in Sylmar, which had only ten members. On the other hand, Chinese, Japanese, Cambodian, Thai and Korean alliances and coalitions banded to form the Asian Pacific Islanders Against Proposition 187 which consisted of hundreds of members. Significantly, many consider the strong reactions by some Asian voters against Proposition 187 to be the first time such numbers of Asian Americans had come together as around 60 organizations joined forces.

== Legal challenges ==
The constitutionality of Proposition 187 was challenged by several lawsuits. On November 11, 1994, three days after the bill's passage, Federal Judge W. Matthew Byrne issued a temporary restraining order against institution of the measure, which was filed by State Attorney General Dan Lungren. After Judge Mariana Pfaelzer issued a permanent injunction of Proposition 187 in December 1994, blocking all provisions except those dealing with higher education and false documents, multiple cases were consolidated and brought before the federal court. In November 1997, Pfaelzer found the law to be unconstitutional on the basis that it infringed on the federal government's exclusive jurisdiction over matters relating to immigration. Pfaelzer also explained that Proposition 187's effect on the Personal Responsibility and Work Opportunity Reconciliation Act of 1996, the congressional overhaul of the American welfare system, proved that the bill was a "scheme" to regulate immigration:

"California is powerless to enact its own legislative scheme to regulate immigration. It is likewise powerless to enact its own legislative scheme to regulate alien access to public benefits."

Governor Wilson appealed the ruling, which brought the case to the federal Ninth Circuit Court of Appeals. But in 1999, the newly elected Democratic Governor Gray Davis had the case brought before mediation. His administration withdrew the appeal before the courts in July 1999, effectively killing the law.

The unenforceable sections of Proposition 187 remained on the books until 2014. In September of that year, California passed a bill, SB 396, that removed those sections from California's education, health and safety, and welfare codes, as a symbolic act after the overturn of Prop.187. Bill author Kevin de León said this "closes a dark chapter in our state's history, and brings dignity and respect to the national immigration debate."

== Legacy ==
Noting a rapid increase in the number of Latinos voting in California elections, some analysts cite Wilson and the Republican Party's embrace of Proposition 187 as a cause of the subsequent failure of the party to win statewide elections. A 2006 study published in the American Journal of Political Science found that Republican support of Proposition 187 and two later state ballot initiatives—Proposition 209 in 1996, which ended affirmative action at governmental institutions, and Proposition 227 in 1998, which limited bilingual education in public schools—shifted both white and Latino voters in California away from identifying with the Republican Party and toward the Democratic Party. The authors of the study said that the "results raise serious questions about the long-term efficacy of racially divisive strategies for electoral gain." Studies published in 2001 and 2011 also show that Proposition 187 mobilized Hispanic voters for the Democratic Party. A 2016 article by pro-immigration researcher Alex Nowrasteh came to the same conclusion. However, a 2018 study questioned the conventional wisdom that Proposition 187 led to an abrupt realignment in Latino voters' political preferences.

Conservative group Eagle Forum instead argues that immigration, whether legal or not, made California's electorate more liberal. Fred Bauer of National Review concurs, adding that Democrats have usually controlled both branches of the California state legislature since the 1960s and that the Democratic Party has had consistently strong support among both white and Hispanic voters in California. Bill Whalen, a former aide to Wilson, in an article for Forbes, noted that Proposition 187 was popular among voters and that Republican struggles in California are partly due to women gradually moving away from the party for other reasons, particularly reproductive rights. Whalen also cited Arnold Schwarzenegger's re-election as governor in 2006, in which he won 39% of the votes cast by Latinos, as evidence that Proposition 187 did not harm Republicans' chances of being elected in California. Writing after Schwarzenegger's 2003 recall election victory, Debra J. Saunders of The Weekly Standard noted that he won the election despite voting for Proposition 187, which other publications had claimed would seriously jeopardize his bid.

Between 1995 and 2004 the following states passed similar ballot initiatives or laws: Arizona, Colorado, Florida, Georgia, Illinois, Nevada, New Mexico, New York, Oklahoma and Texas.

During Donald Trump's 2016 U.S. presidential campaign, his use of "anti-immigrant tactics" drew comparisons from media members to Wilson and California Proposition 187. Seema Mehta of the Los Angeles Times wrote, "Many have had a visceral reaction to Trump's proposals that include deporting 11 million people and building an enormous border wall. Protests greet Trump whenever he holds rallies in California."

== Exit poll ==
Demographic Subgroup	Support	Oppose	% of Total Vote
All Voters	59	41	100
Counties
Los Angeles	56	44	24
San Diego and Orange	67	33	23
Bay Area	45	55	17
Central Valley	66	34	15
Inland Empire	70	30	8
Central Coast	60	40	7
North Coast	68	32	6
Party ID
Republican	76	24	40
Democrat	40	60	40
Independent	61	39	20
Political Ideology
Conservative	76	24	37
Moderate	56	44	45
Liberal	32	68	18
Sex
Male	62	38	49
Female	56	44	51
Ethnicity
White	64	36	78
White (Men)	69	31	38
White (Women)	59	41	40
Latino	27	71	9
Black	52	48	7
Asian	52	48	6
Age
18-29	49	51	14
30-49	58	42	43
50-59	59	41	17
60+	66	34	26
Income
Under $20,000	53	47	15
$20,000-$40,000	60	40	25
$40,000-$60,000	59	41	24
Over $60,000	58	42	36
Religion
Protestant	69	31	48
Catholic	49	51	27
Jewish	45	55	5
Other	53	47	8
No Preference	48	52	12
Residency
1st/2nd Gen Citizen	52	48	25
3rd Gen or more	60	40	75

== Results ==
County	Yes		No		Total
County	#	%	#	%	Total
Alameda	160,367	40.37%	236,910	59.63%	397,277
Alpine	449	65.17%	240	34.83%	689
Amador	9,194	71.14%	3,730	28.86%	12,924
Butte	47,518	69.79%	20,571	30.21%	68,089
Calaveras	11,166	71.18%	4,521	28.82%	15,687
Colusa	3,878	77.24%	1,143	22.76%	5,021
Contra Costa	154,462	51.90%	143,152	48.10%	297,614
Del Norte	5,136	68.87%	2,322	31.13%	7,458
El Dorado	38,445	70.63%	15,988	29.37%	54,433
Fresno	116,977	65.95%	60,395	34.05%	177,372
Glenn	6,044	76.76%	1,830	23.24%	7,874
Humboldt	25,291	53.20%	22,245	46.80%	47,536
Imperial	14,905	62.87%	8,802	37.13%	23,707
Inyo	5,427	74.82%	1,826	25.18%	7,253
Kern	109,710	72.78%	41,040	27.22%	150,750
Kings	15,528	68.97%	6,986	31.03%	22,514
Lake	13,152	67.15%	6,434	32.85%	19,586
Lassen	5,979	73.52%	2,154	26.48%	8,133
Los Angeles	1,145,622	56.04%	898,500	43.96%	2,044,122
Madera	20,151	75.06%	6,694	24.94%	26,845
Marin	43,284	41.27%	61,606	58.73%	104,890
Mariposa	5,251	73.10%	1,932	26.90%	7,183
Mendocino	16,054	53.82%	13,774	46.18%	29,828
Merced	27,531	70.20%	11,685	29.80%	39,216
Modoc	2,788	72.08%	1,080	27.92%	3,868
Mono	2,396	67.86%	1,135	32.14%	3,531
Monterey	55,205	60.27%	36,386	39.73%	91,591
Napa	24,031	56.67%	18,373	43.33%	42,404
Nevada	26,462	69.67%	11,519	30.33%	37,981
Orange	510,651	67.10%	250,416	32.90%	761,067
Placer	52,330	69.12%	23,380	30.88%	75,710
Plumas	6,189	73.04%	2,285	26.96%	8,474
Riverside	243,880	70.88%	100,210	29.12%	344,090
Sacramento	207,010	59.35%	141,774	40.65%	348,784
San Benito	6,933	59.02%	4,813	40.98%	11,746
San Bernardino	237,880	68.80%	107,862	31.20%	345,742
San Diego	508,803	67.37%	246,457	32.63%	755,260
San Francisco	69,313	29.27%	167,473	70.73%	236,786
San Joaquin	81,525	64.55%	44,782	35.45%	126,307
San Luis Obispo	54,500	62.89%	32,155	37.11%	86,655
San Mateo	101,786	47.36%	113,134	52.64%	214,920
Santa Barbara	76,628	58.04%	55,388	41.96%	132,016
Santa Clara	212,054	47.99%	229,795	52.01%	441,849
Santa Cruz	43,261	47.22%	48,351	52.78%	91,612
Shasta	40,316	74.94%	13,482	25.06%	53,798
Sierra	1,160	70.65%	482	29.35%	1,642
Siskiyou	13,159	72.29%	5,043	27.71%	18,202
Solano	56,075	57.42%	41,575	42.58%	97,650
Sonoma	79,063	49.40%	80,988	50.60%	160,051
Stanislaus	67,292	67.51%	32,388	32.49%	99,680
Sutter	16,623	75.09%	5,515	24.91%	22,138
Tehama	13,914	75.13%	4,605	24.87%	18,519
Trinity	3,740	69.05%	1,676	30.95%	5,416
Tulare	55,579	71.26%	22,418	28.74%	77,997
Tuolumne	13,624	69.71%	5,921	30.29%	19,545
Ventura	143,111	65.52%	75,321	34.48%	218,432
Yolo	24,398	49.33%	25,057	50.67%	49,455
Yuba	10,337	73.57%	3,713	26.43%	14,050
Totals	5,063,537	58.93%	3,529,432	41.07%	8,592,969

== See also ==
- California Coalition for Immigration Reform
- Gallegly amendment
- California Proposition 209
