= American Immigration Control Foundation =

American Immigration Control Foundation (AIC Foundation) is an American political group that campaigns to reduce immigration to the United States, particularly from developing countries and countries in Central and South America. It is a large publisher and distributor of publications dealing with immigration into the United States. AIC Foundation also conducts multi-media campaigns around the country to raise public awareness of immigration problems.

Founded in 1983 and based in Monterey, Virginia, AIC Foundation received more than $190,000 through 1998 from the controversial Pioneer Fund. AICF was headed by John Vinson from 1990 to 2003. Samuel T. Francis, a columnist for the Council of Conservative Citizens (successor group of the segregationist White Citizens' Councils), was AICF chairman in the mid-1990s.
