= Center for Immigration Studies =

American anti-immigration non-profit think tank

- Formation: January 9, 1986; 40 years ago
- Type: Public policy think tank
- Tax ID no.: 52-1449368
- Headquarters: 1629 K Street N.W., Suite 600, Washington, D.C., U.S.
- Location: Washington, D.C., U.S.
- Executive Director: Mark Krikorian
- Website: www.cis.org

The Center for Immigration Studies (CIS) is an American anti-immigration think tank. It favors far lower immigration numbers and produces analyses to further those views. The CIS was founded by historian Otis L. Graham alongside eugenicist and white nationalist John Tanton in 1985 as a spin-off of the Federation for American Immigration Reform (FAIR). It is one of a number of anti-immigration organizations founded by Tanton, along with FAIR and NumbersUSA. CIS has been involved in the creation of Project 2025.

Reports published by CIS have been disputed by scholars on immigration, fact-checkers and news outlets, and immigration-research organizations. The organization had significant influence within the Trump administration, which cited the group's work to defend its immigration policies. The Southern Poverty Law Center designated CIS as a hate group with ties to the American nativist movement.

== History and funding ==
The CIS was founded by Otis L. Graham and John Tanton. The organization was founded in 1985 as a spin-off from the Federation for American Immigration Reform and is one of a number of anti-immigration organizations founded by Tanton, along with FAIR and NumbersUSA. Otis L. Graham, professor emeritus of history at the University of California, Santa Barbara was the founding chairman of CIS, and later a founding board member. John Tanton, an ophthalmologist, eugenicist, and white nationalist, was instrumental in its founding. The CIS began as the research arm of the Federation for American Immigration Reform (FAIR), and became a separate entity in 1986. According to immigration historian Carly Goodman, Tanton created CIS as a separate entity from FAIR so that they could produce research that had a greater appearance of objectivity.

CIS does not provide information about sources of funding. The Colcom Foundation, a prominent supporter of the immigration control movement in the United States, has been identified as one of its main funders.

CIS has been described as conservative, a label rejected by the organization. After an NPR story described CIS as "decidedly right-wing", Edward Schumacher-Matos, the then ombudsman of NPR, argued that this mislabelled CIS, noting the organization's "political diversity".

=== Trump administration ===
CIS influenced the Trump 2016 campaign and Trump administration's rhetoric on immigration. Trump's first national general election advertisement cited CIS.

In 2017, CIS analyst Jon Feere joined the Immigration and Customs Enforcement of the Trump administration. In his writings for CIS, Feere had claimed that giving birth on U.S. soil gives immigrants access to welfare and other social benefits, and that this gives rise to "birth tourism" (the practice of foreigners traveling to the United States to give birth to U.S. citizens). CNN wrote that "Politifact has mostly debunked those claims, concluding that US-born children do little in the long term to help their immigrant parents. Citizen children cannot sponsor their parents for citizenship until the young person turns 21 and any social benefits would be given to the child and not their undocumented parents, who do not qualify. The Pew Research Center also has found that the number of babies born to unauthorized immigrants in the United States has been declining steadily in recent years."

In September 2017, the Trump administration defended its claim that Deferred Action for Childhood Arrivals (DACA) "denied jobs to hundreds of thousands of Americans by allowing those same illegal aliens to take those jobs" by citing editorials written by members of the Center for Immigration Studies. However, economists consulted by PolitiFact rejected the claim, noting that the job market is not fixed or zero-sum.

In May 2018, President Trump nominated Ronald Mortensen, a CIS fellow, as Assistant Secretary of State for the Bureau of Population, Refugees, and Migration, a top state department position overseeing refugee resettlement. Mortensen had been a vocal critic of illegal immigration.

In March 2019, CIS fellow Todd Bensman claimed that female migrants were given free elective laser eye surgery in detention centers, and that their children were given free braces. The Associated Press found the claims to be false.

== Policy stances and activities ==
The Center for Immigration Studies supports lower levels of legal immigration and stricter enforcement measures against illegal immigration.

=== Support for Trump administration's family separation policy ===
In 2018, CIS defended the Trump administration's decision to separate undocumented immigrant children from their parents. CIS argued that the policy deterred immigrant families from crossing the US border and said that the policy "actually protects foreign nationals." At a June 2018 event hosted at CIS, outgoing acting director of Immigration and Customs Enforcement, Thomas Homan, defended the policy.

=== Opposition to sanctuary cities ===
CIS opposes sanctuary cities, which are jurisdictions which limit cooperation with federal immigrant enforcement agencies or prioritize law enforcement resources for other things than immigration enforcement.

=== Opposition to work permits for foreign university students ===
CIS seeks an end to "Optional Practical Training" work permits, which foreign students who attend American universities can use to obtain internships.

=== Publications ===
CIS publishes research and analysis of immigration data. The organization's publications address topics relating to both illegal and legal immigration.

=== Project 2025 ===
CIS is a member of the advisory board of Project 2025, a collection of conservative and right-wing policy proposals from the Heritage Foundation to reshape the United States federal government and consolidate executive power should the Republican nominee win the 2024 presidential election.

== Criticism ==
The Southern Poverty Law Center (SPLC) published reports in 2002 and 2009 on John Tanton, who founded CIS. Tanton is a retired Michigan ophthalmologist who opposed immigration on racial grounds, desired a white ethnic majority in the United States and advocated for eugenics. The SPLC's 2009 report charged that "FAIR, CIS and NumbersUSA are all part of a network of restrictionist organizations conceived and created by John Tanton" who they said had "deeply racist" views, and said that the group had "frequently manipulated data" in order to promote anti-immigration goals.

In a response in the National Review, Krikorian called the SPLC's report "hackwork", and pointed to members of the CIS board who were involved with civil rights organizations as evidence that the group was not a hate group. Tanton also denied the SPLC's accusations. As to his alleged influence at CIS, he wrote, "I also helped raise a grant in 1985 for the Center for Immigration Studies, but I have played no role in the Center's growth or development." According to CNN, Tanton openly embraced eugenics. The New York Times noted that Tanton made his case against immigration in racial terms. CIS has consequently been criticized for its reluctance to criticize Tanton and his views.

In 2004, a Wall Street Journal editorial repeated the SPLC's allegation that CIS is part of a network of organizations founded by Tanton and also charged that these organizations are "trying to stop immigration to the U.S." It quoted Chris Cannon, at the time a Republican U.S. representative from Utah, as saying, "Tanton set up groups like CIS and FAIR to take an analytical approach to immigration from a Republican point of view so that they can give cover to Republicans who oppose immigration for other reasons."

Several months earlier, Krikorian denied allegations made in a similarly critical The Wall Street Journal editorial and by Representative Cannon, writing "This kind of venomous lying and guilt by association are par for the course in the fever swamps of the web, but are startling in the halls of the U.S. Congress and the pages of the nation's largest-circulation newspaper." Although former Representative Cannon expressed a negative view of CIS, the CIS website quotes other elected officials, including U.S. Representative Lamar S. Smith (R-TX), former Governor Richard D. Lamm (D-CO), U.S. Senator Jeff Sessions (R-AL), and former U.S. Senator Alan Simpson (R-WY), in support of the organization.

In 2016, the SPLC began describing CIS as an anti-immigrant hate group. It cited CIS's repeated publication of white nationalist and anti-Semitic writers, its employment of an analyst known to promote racist pseudoscience, its association with John Tanton, and its record of publishing reports that it said hyped the criminality of immigrants. In 2019, CIS sued the SPLC over the hate group designation in a RICO lawsuit, alleging that the designation was false and part of a "smear campaign". Notre Dame Law School professor G. Robert Blakey, the author of the 1970 RICO statute, described CIS's filing as "not too thoughtful" and said its legal claims lacked merit. The SPLC described the suit as an attempt to suppress their right to free speech. The lawsuit was dismissed in September 2019 by Judge Amy Berman Jackson for failure to state a claim.

=== Disputed reports ===
The Center for Immigration Studies has been criticized for publishing a number of reports deemed to be false or misleading and using poor methodology by scholars on immigration, such as the authors of the National Academies of Sciences 2016 report on immigration; by think tanks such as the Center on Budget and Policy Priorities, the Cato Institute, Urban Institute and Center for American Progress; fact-checkers such as FactCheck.Org, PolitiFact, Washington Post, Snopes and NBC News; and by other immigration-research organizations (such as Migration Policy Institute and the Immigration Policy Center).

=== Back Where We Started: An Examination of Trends in Immigrant Welfare Use Since Welfare Reform (2003) ===
A March 2003 CIS report said that between 1996 and 2001 welfare use by immigrant-headed households had increased and that "welfare use rates for immigrants and natives are essentially back to where they were in 1996 when welfare reform was passed." The Center on Budget and Policy Priorities said this was misleading because the U.S. children of noncitizens "account[ed] for all of the increase in Medicaid or SCHIP participation among U.S. citizens living in low-income households headed by noncitizens."

=== Immigrants in the United States, 2007 ===
In March 2007, CIS issued a report saying that the "proportion of immigrant-headed households using at least one major welfare program is 33 percent, compared to 19 percent for native households." Wayne A. Cornelius of the Center for Comparative Immigration Studies at UCSD, wrote that this was misleading because "once 'welfare usage' is disaggregated, as Camarota does in a table near the end of his report, we see that food assistance is the only category in which there is a significant difference between immigrant- and native-headed households. Immigrants are significantly less likely than natives to use Medicaid, and they use subsidized housing and cash assistance programs at about the same (low) rate as natives."

=== H-1Bs: Still Not the Best and Brightest (2008) ===
Norman Matloff, a UC Davis professor of computer science, wrote a report featured at CIS arguing that most H-1B visa workers, rather than being "the best and the brightest", are mostly of average talent. James Shrek of The Heritage Foundation argued that Matloff's methodology was a "highly misleading measure of ability", as Matloff simply looked at the wages of the H-1B visa workers and how they compared to other workers in the sector. Shrek notes that the existing data shows that H-1B workers are more skilled than the average American: "H-1B workers are highly educated. Almost half have an advanced degree. The median H-1B worker earns 90 percent more than the median U.S. worker. They are in no way average workers." Matloff, in his reply, said that H-1B workers were not supposed to be compared to median workers and that Sherk's argument is "completely at odds with the claims the industry has made concerning the "best and brightest" issue" and that comparison to O-1 visa wage data showed that H-1B visas were being used by employers to undercut wages.

=== Who Benefited from Job Growth In Texas? (2011) ===
In September 2011, CIS published a report saying that, in the period 2007–2011, immigrants (legal and illegal) had taken 81% of newly created jobs in the state. According to Jeffrey S. Passel, senior demographer for the Pew Hispanic Center, "there are lots of methodological problems with the CIS study, mainly having to do with the limitations of small sample sizes and the fact that the estimates are determined by taking differences of differences based on small sample sizes." Chuck DeVore, a conservative at the Texas Public Policy Foundation, criticized the report, saying that it "relied on flawed methodology." CIS subsequently replied to DeVore's criticism. The report was subsequently cited by Mitt Romney and David Frum. Politifact, when evaluating Frum and Romney's statements, noted that CIS's report "does acknowledge that 'no estimate of illegal immigration is exact'. But the methodological shortcomings also weaken the certainty of Romney's statistic. On balance, we think that both the report's authors and its critics have reasonable points. In the big picture, we agree with Chuck DeVore – a conservative critic of the study – that 'trying to draw conclusions about immigration and employment in Texas in isolation from other factors is problematic at best.' But we also agree with Mark Krikorian, the Center for Immigration Studies' executive director, that 'even if DeVore prefers a net-to-net comparison, immigrants still got a disproportionate share of new jobs'."

=== ICE Document Details 36,000 Criminal Alien Releases in 2013 (2014) ===
In May 2014, a CIS report said that in 2013 Immigration and Customs Enforcement had "freed 36,007 convicted criminal aliens from detention who were awaiting the outcome of deportation proceedings ... [and t]he vast majority of these releases from ICE custody were discretionary, not required by law (in fact, in some instances, apparently contrary to law), nor the result of local sanctuary policies." An ICE spokesman said that many such releases were required by law, for instance when a detainee's home country refuses to accept them or required by a judge's order. Caitlin Dickson, writing in the Daily Beast said that ICE had "highlighted key points that CIS failed to address." Associated Press, however, when reporting on CIS's figures, said that "the releases that weren't mandated by law, including [the] 28 percent of the immigrants with homicide convictions, undermines the government's argument that it uses its declining resources for immigration enforcement to find and jail serious criminal immigrants who may pose a threat to public safety or national security." CIS's report was criticized by the Immigration Policy Center of the American Immigration Council who said that "looking at this group of people as an undifferentiated whole doesn't tell you much about who poses a risk to public safety and who does not." Muzaffar Chishti, the New York director of the nonpartisan Migration Policy Institute, said that the CIS report was "a select presentation of a set of facts without any comparative analysis that can lead to misleading conclusions." According to CBS, Gregory Chen of the American Immigration Lawyers Association said the report had "a lot of misleading information" and "that the report's definition of criminals who have been 'released' includes those who are still subject to supervision including electronic ankle monitoring and regular check ins with ICE."

=== The Cost of Welfare Use By Immigrant and Native Households (2015) ===
A May 2015 report by CIS stated that "immigrant households receive 41 percent more federal welfare than households headed by native-born citizens." The report was criticized on the basis of poor methodology by Alex Nowrasteh of the Cato Institute. Nowrasteh said that the report opted not to examine how much welfare immigrants use, but to examine households led by an immigrant so that the report could count the welfare usage of the immigrant's US-born children, which leads to a misleading estimate of immigrant welfare use.

=== National Academy of Sciences Study of Immigration: Workers and Taxpayers Lose, Businesses Benefit (2016) ===
In September 2016, CIS misrepresented the findings of a comprehensive state-of-the-art report on the academic immigration literature by the National Academies of Sciences. CIS headlined its own summary of the report, "National Academy of Sciences Study of Immigration: Workers and Taxpayers Lose, Businesses Benefit." A 2018 Proceedings of the National Academy of Sciences study cited CIS's misrepresentation, which was repeated by President Trump, as an example of unscrupulous actors with ulterior motives who make it difficult for researchers to communicate scientific findings to the public.

=== Stephen Miller and the State Department ===
In 2017, Stephen Miller, a senior White House policy adviser, sought to get the State Department to use figures from CIS that were considered flawed by the State Department. They claimed that refugees cost 12 times more to resettle in the United States than to resettle them in the region of the world where they were from. State Department officials refused to use the CIS report because the report failed to take into account the contributions that the refugees would make through paying taxes.

=== Study Reveals 72 Terrorists Came From Countries Covered by Trump Vetting Order (2017) ===
A February 2017 CIS report said that "72 individuals from the seven countries covered in President Trump's vetting executive order have been convicted in terror cases since the 9/11 attacks", an assertion that several fact-checking agencies debunked. Stephen Miller, a senior White House policy adviser, used the data provided by CIS to justify President Trump's 90-day travel ban, earning him "Three Pinocchois" from the Washington Post Fact-Checker (its second-worst rating). FactCheck.org found that most (44 of the 72) had not been convicted on terrorism charges, and that none of the 72 people were responsible for a terrorism-related death in the US, and Snopes mirrored the assessment.

=== The Cost of a Border Wall vs. the Cost of Illegal Immigration (2017) ===
In March 2018, the Trump administration stated that construction on a Mexico border wall would pay for itself by keeping undocumented immigrants out of the United States, citing a CIS report. The CIS report was based on data from the 2016 National Academies of Science (NAS) report. However, several of the authors of the NAS report said that CIS misused the data from the report, made unjustifiable methodological decisions, and that it was likelier that keeping undocumented immigrants out would reduce government revenue. The 18-member panel of economists, sociologists, demographers and public policy experts, and chosen by the National Academies of Science, concluded that undocumented immigrants had a net positive fiscal impact.

=== The Fiscal Impact of Refugee Resettlement (2020) ===
In 2020, CIS published a report arguing that refugees had an adverse fiscal impact. The Niskanen Center pointed out that the report in question used arbitrary and questionable cut-offs to make claims about the fiscal impact of the refugees. For example, CIS downgraded refugees' educational attainment in questionable ways, such as claiming that refugees with medical degrees had only "some college".
