= Californians for Population Stabilization =

US non-profit organization

Californians for Population Stabilization, Inc.
- Abbreviation: CAPS
- Merged into: NumbersUSA
- Formation: March 12, 1979
- Tax ID no.: 94-2581509
- Registration no.: C0912758 (California)
- President: Ben Zuckerman
- Website: capsweb.org
- Formerly called: Zero Population Growth - California, Incorporated

Californians for Population Stabilization (CAPS) was an American anti-immigration focused non-profit organization founded in 1986 in California. CAPS was the former Californian branch of the Zero Population Growth (ZPG) organization. The group merged with NumbersUSA in 2025.

== Overview ==
Its stated aim was to help advance state policies and programs designed to stabilize the population at a level which they felt would "preserve a good quality of life for all Californians". The organization asserted that the current growth of population was "unsustainable" and contributed to a growing strain on the environment and infrastructure. After the population of California plateaued in the early 2020s, CAPS' Board of Directors decided that "a population stabilization organization with a focus on California no longer makes much sense" and the organization merged into NumbersUSA, a national anti-immigration advocacy group.

== Immigration ==
CAPS supports immigration reduction. In 1993, CAPS filed a lawsuit against Hewlett Packard alleging that HP was violating California labor laws and paid below-market wages to residents of India who came to the U.S. to work as contract programmers. The lawsuit was first publicized on CBS's 60 Minutes. CAPS claimed that such wage practices would drive down wages for U.S. workers. CAPS ultimately lost the lawsuit.

CAPS has been described by the Southern Poverty Law Center as an "anti-immigrant hate group". Until 2017, CAPS' director of public affairs was a documented neo-nazi.
