= Council of Conservative Citizens =

American white supremacist political group

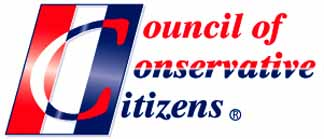
- Abbreviation: CofCC or CCC
- Predecessor: Citizens' Councils
- Formation: 1985; 41 years ago Atlanta, Georgia, U.S.
- Type: 501(c)4
- Tax ID no.: 36-3354434
- Headquarters: Potosi, Missouri
- President: Earl P. Holt III
- Website: conservative-headlines.org

The Council of Conservative Citizens (CofCC or CCC) is an American white supremacist organization. Founded in 1985, It is a successor organization to the loosely federated segregationist Citizens' Councils founded to oppose the integration of schools. The organization is headquartered in Potosi, Missouri. The group attracted the support of some prominent Southern politicians, mainly Republicans, until Georgia representative Bob Barr came under intense scrutiny for giving the keynote address at the CofCC's 1998 national convention. The group attracted further backlash and condemnation following the 2015 Charleston church shooting when perpetrator Dylann Roof mentioned the group positively in his manifesto.

== History ==
The Council of Conservative Citizens was founded in 1985 in Atlanta, Georgia, and relocated to St. Louis, Missouri. The CofCC was formed by white supremacists, including some former members of the Citizens' Councils of America, sometimes called the White Citizens' Councils, a segregationist organization that rose to prominence after the 1954 Brown v. Board of Education ruling that struck down segregated schools. The CofCC's original mailing list came from the Citizen's Council, as did several members of the CofCC Board of Directors. Lester Maddox, former governor of Georgia, was a charter member. Gordon Lee Baum, a retired personal injury lawyer, was CEO until he died in March 2015. Earl P. Holt III of Longview, Texas is the president. Leonard Wilson, a former Alabama State Committeeman for both Republican and Democratic parties and state commander for the Sons of Confederate Veterans, was a founder.

The organization often holds meetings with various other ethno-nationalist organizations in the United States, and sometimes meets with nationalist organizations from Europe. In 1997, several members of the CofCC attended an event hosted by Jean-Marie Le Pen's National Front party. Following several articles detailing some of its members' past involvement with the White Citizens' Councils, several conservative politicians distanced themselves from the organization. Although Representative Bob Barr had spoken at CofCC functions, including its 1998 national convention, in 1999 he later disavowed the CofCC saying he found the group's racial views to be "repugnant," and that he had not realized the nature of the group when he agreed to speak at its meeting.

In later years, the press reported the involvement of other politicians with the CofCC. For instance, U.S. Senate majority leader Trent Lott had also been a member of the CofCC. Following the press report, the Chairman of the Republican National Committee, Jim Nicholson, denounced the CofCC for holding "racist and nationalist views" and demanded that Lott formally denounce the organization. Although Lott refused to denounce the organization, he said that he had resigned his membership. Subsequently, Nicholson demanded Lott denounce his former segregationist views following a speech he gave at Senator Strom Thurmond's birthday dinner in 2002, when Lott praised the Senator's 1948 Dixiecrat presidential campaign. Following the controversy sparked by Nicholson's demands, Lott apologized for his past support for segregation, his past associations, and his remarks at Thurmond's birthday. This caused him loss of support from a number of important segregationists, not least Thurmond himself. Consequently, Lott resigned his post as Senate Minority Leader.

Similarly, former House minority leader Dick Gephardt (D) had attended an event of the organization's St. Louis predecessor, the "Metro-South Citizens Council", shortly before the name was changed in the mid-1980s. He has repeatedly said that this was a mistake.

In 1993, Mike Huckabee, then the lieutenant governor of Arkansas, agreed to speak at the CofCC's national convention in Memphis, Tennessee, in his campaign for the governorship of Arkansas. By the time of the CofCC convention, Huckabee was unable to leave Arkansas. He sent a videotaped speech, which "was viewed and extremely well received by the audience," according to the CofCC newsletter. However, following his election as governor, in April 1994, Huckabee withdrew from a speaking engagement before the CofCC. He commented, "I will not participate in any program that has racist overtones. I've spent a lifetime fighting racism and anti-Semitism."

The Southern Poverty Law Center (SPLC) and the Miami Herald tallied 38 federal, state, and local politicians who appeared at CofCC events between 2000 and 2004. The Anti-Defamation League (ADL) says the following politicians are members or have spoken at meetings: Senator Trent Lott, Mississippi governor Haley Barbour, Mississippi state senators Gary Jackson, and Dean Kirby, several Mississippi state representatives. Speakers have included ex-governors Guy Hunt of Alabama, and Kirk Fordice of Mississippi. U.S. senator Roger Wicker of Mississippi is said to have attended as well.

As of 2003, Mississippi was the only state that had major politicians who were openly CofCC members, including state senators and state representatives. The CofCC once claimed 34 members in the Mississippi legislature.

In 2005, the Council of Conservative Citizens held its National Conference in Montgomery, Alabama. George Wallace Jr., an Alabama public service commissioner and former state treasurer who was then running for lieutenant governor, and Sonny Landham, an actor, spoke at the conference.

Around early 2026, the Council of Conservative Citizens' website was no longer accessible due to action from the domain registrar, GoDaddy. The status of the group is currently unknown.

== Platform ==
The CofCC considers itself a traditionalist group opposing liberals and what they refer to as mainstream conservatives; it supports national self-determination, immigration restriction, federalism, and home rule, and opposes free trade and global capitalism. Its specific issues include states' rights, race relations (especially interracial marriage, which it opposes), and Christian right values. In 2003, a full 35 years after his assassination, they criticized Martin Luther King Jr. as a "charlatan" and left-wing agitator of Black American communities, with notable ties to communism and holding personal sexual morals unworthy of a person deserving national recognition. They consider the American Civil Rights Movement and the Frankfurt School as elementally subversive to the separation of powers under the United States Constitution. The Council of Conservative Citizens is active in organizing the restriction, reduction, or moratorium of immigration, enforcing laws and regulations against illegal aliens, ending what they see as racial discrimination against whites through affirmative action and racial quotas, overturning Supreme Court rulings and Congressional Acts such as busing for desegregation and gun control, ending free trade economic policy, and supporting a traditionalist sexual morality, which includes promotion of the Defense of Marriage Act and opposition to the inclusion of homosexuality as a civil right.

The CofCC's statement of principles condemns the federal government's intervention into state and local affairs in forcing racial integration (item 2), free-trade and globalism, immigration by non-Europeans (item 2), homosexuality, and interracial marriage (item 6). CofCC's materials in 2001 said, "God is the author of racism. God is the One who divided mankind into different types. Mixing the races is rebelliousness against God."

In a 2015 statement, president Earl Holt wrote, "The CofCC is one of perhaps three websites in the world that accurately and honestly report black-on-white violent crime, and in particular, the seemingly endless incidents involving black-on-white murder."

The CofCC publishes the Citizens Informer newspaper quarterly. Previous editors include Sam Francis.

== Reception ==
Various critics describe the organization as a hate group. According to The Atlantic, most conservatives do not consider it to be conservative, and believe that the organization added the word to their name in order to hide their true ideology. The New York Times called it a white separatist group with a thinly veiled white supremacist agenda. The Anti-Defamation League said: "Although the group claims not to be racist, its leaders traffic with other white supremacist groups." The group is considered by the Southern Poverty Law Center (SPLC) to be part of the "neo-confederate movement", and organizations, such as the NAACP, as well as the Anti-Defamation League, consider it to be a threat. In The Nation, Max Blumenthal described it as one of the United States' largest white supremacist groups.

Conservative columnist Ann Coulter has defended the group against charges of racism, stating on the basis of a viewing of their website that there is "no evidence" that the CofCC supports segregation.

Mass murderer Dylann Roof, the perpetrator of the 2015 Charleston church shooting, searched the Internet for information on "black on White crime" and wrote in his manifesto The Last Rhodesian that the first website he found was the CofCC's. He cited its portrayal of "black on White murders" as something that radically changed him ("I have never been the same since that day"). The CofCC issued a statement on its website "unequivocally condemn[ing]" the attack, but that Roof has some "legitimate grievances" against black people. An additional statement from Earl Holt III, president of the CofCC, disavowed responsibility for the crime and stated that the group's website "accurately and honestly report[s] black-on-white violent crime". While these statements were condemned across the mainstream, several white supremacist organization supported the CofCC for standing by Roof's motivations, including the League of the South, a neo-confederate hate group.

In the wake of Roof's arrest and subsequent exposure of his affinity for the CofCC, an investigation revealed that Holt made campaign contributions to several prominent Republican politicians, including 2016 Republican presidential candidates Ted Cruz, Rick Santorum, and Scott Walker, as well as Republican senators Rand Paul and Tom Cotton. Holt also reportedly donated to the campaign of Black congresswoman Mia Love, whose parents are both immigrants. All subsequently announced that they would return Holt's contributions or donate them to a fund for the families of Roof's victims. In the summer of 2020, an investigation by NPR uncovered records showing Holt had donated $1,000 to the Committee to Defend the President, a pro-Trump SuperPAC, aggressively engaged in the 2020 presidential campaign. Through their general counsel, the Committee to Defend the President said they had been unaware and thanked NPR for bringing the issue to their attention. The group said they would immediately refund Holt's donation.

== See also ==
- Alt-right
- Far-right politics
- Radical right (United States)
