= Social Contract Press =

American publisher of white nationalist and anti-immigrant literature

The Social Contract Press (SCP) is an American publisher of white nationalist and anti-immigrant literature. It is a program of U.S. Inc., a foundation formed by John Tanton, who was called by the Southern Poverty Law Center (SPLC) "the racist founder and principal ideologue of the modern nativist movement". Founded in 1990, it publishes the quarterly Social Contract journal, as well as reprints and new works.

The editor of the journal since 1998 is Wayne Lutton, a white nationalist author whose book The Social Contract was banned from entering Canada as hate literature. Lutton has led or been involved with various white nationalist groups, anti-LGBT efforts, and other far-right activities. He has said the United States should be a country for only whites, telling a white supremacist conference, "We are the real Americans, not the Hmong, not Latinos, not the Siberian-Americans."

Since 2006, Kevin Lamb has been the managing editor of The Social Contract. Lamb was fired as managing editor of Human Events and The Evans-Novak Political Report after it was revealed that he was also editing the white nationalist journal The Occidental Quarterly at the same time. Lamb had contributed work to racist publications since the early 1990s, according to the SPLC.

Social Contract Press has been described by the SPLC as a hate group, and by The Guardian as racist. It reprinted Jean Raspail's 1973 racist fantasy novel The Camp of the Saints. In 1996, editor Lutton described the book as a warning to white Americans, who he claimed were the "real Americans". According to SPLC, the novel was one of several racist works published by the company.

Social Contract Press's staff overlaps with, and has promoted, other white nationalist, white supremacist and anti-immigration organizations such as VDARE, to which an entire issue of the journal was dedicated; the Federation for American Immigration Reform, which Tanton also founded; Numbers USA; the New Century Foundation's American Renaissance magazine; and the Council of Conservative Citizens.

== See also ==
- List of organizations designated by the Southern Poverty Law Center as hate groups
