= NumbersUSA =

Anti-immigration group

- Formation: 1996
- Founder: Roy Beck
- Location: Arlington County, Virginia, U.S.
- Key people: Anne Manetas, COO; Eddie Huey, CIO
- Revenue: US$ 7.46 million (2019)
- Endowment: US$ 8.97 million (2016)
- Website: www.numbersusa.com

NumbersUSA is an anti-immigration advocacy group that seeks to reduce both legal and illegal immigration to the United States.

NumbersUSA was founded by Roy Beck in 1996, with assistance from the anti-immigration movement figure John Tanton. NumbersUSA, along with the Center for Immigration Studies (CIS) and the Federation for American Immigration Reform (FAIR), two other groups that Tanton founded, formed "the bulk of the anti-immigration movement" in the United States as of 2018, according to The Detroit News.

== History ==
NumbersUSA was founded by Roy Beck in 1996 after he wrote the book, The Case Against Immigration. He claimed to have seen problems in the United States resulting from immigration during his research for the book, which he based on a study of crime in Wausau, Wisconsin. Beck, a newspaper journalist for three decades, had become an editor at the anti-immigration crusader John Tanton's The Social Contract starting in 1992, and would be an employee of Tanton's U.S. Inc. for 10 years.

Tanton, who helped in the launching of NumbersUSA, had previously founded other anti-immigration groups including the Center for Immigration Studies (CIS) and the Federation for American Immigration Reform (FAIR). As described in The Detroit News, "The three Washington groups worked in tandem: FAIR lobbied Congress, CIS testified at government hearings, and NumbersUSA had followers ring legislators’ phones off the hook." NumbersUSA said it was independent of Tanton since 2002.

NumbersUSA credited Texas Democrat Barbara Jordan as its "spiritual godmother" after she chaired the bipartisan U.S. Commission on Immigration Reform committee from 1994 until her death. The organization claims that Jordan's recommendations to cut annual green cards from 675,000 a year to 550,000 as well as eliminating "chain migration" during the Clinton administration were in line with its mission to reduce job competition and lower fiscal costs. The Clinton administration did not move forward with the recommendations, though the Commission did establish E-Verify. Other members of the commission have stated that NumbersUSA took Jordan's recommendations out of context as it also proposed a global wait list for more than 1 million immigration applicants.

In 2004, NumbersUSA reported 50,000 members.

In 2007, NumbersUSA was influential in derailing a bipartisan comprehensive immigration bill. The organization's members used information and tools from NumbersUSA to contact legislators and voice opposition. It claimed to have 1.5 million members that year.

It has opposed United States immigration amnesty policies such as Deferred Action for Childhood Arrivals, claiming that "employers were allowed to hire the DACA parents for 10, 15, 20 years." During the first Trump administration, NumbersUSA criticized efforts by Jared Kushner on concessions made in the legislative process of the RAISE Act after initially praising the president and called Trump "very weak" for not mandating E-Verify despite campaigning to "hire American".

According to The Atlantic, NumbersUSA consisted of 2 million members as of 2013.

In November 2022, the organization announced James Massa, a former Cisco executive, as its next chief executive officer following the retirement of its founder, Beck.

In 2025, the anti-immigrant group Californians for Population Stabilization (CAPS) merged into NumbersUSA. CAPS was designated as a hate group by the Southern Poverty Law Center due to its history of anti-immigrant activism, racially charged views expressed by its founders and associates, and its employment of white nationalists and a documented neo-Nazi.

== Views ==
The organization's founder has claimed that the 1960s environmental movement and effect of population growth on natural resources led to an interest in immigration in the United States. NumbersUSA messaging argues that population growth is driven by immigration and that America does not have the infrastructure to support millions of migrants. It has opined that restricting immigration also increases jobs and wages for African American and Latino citizens with a message on its website stating "nothing about this website should be construed as advocating hostile actions or feelings toward immigrant Americans; illegal aliens deserve humane treatment even as they are detected, detained and deported."

NumbersUSA began marketing a 1996 video presentation by its founder using gumballs to illustrate immigration to the United States with a conclusion that the country was not alleviating poverty worldwide by allowing migrants. The original video was viewed more the 6 million online before it was uploaded to YouTube in 2010.

NumbersUSA has run ads containing "inaccurate, inflated and emotionally charged claims" according to FactCheck.Org and PolitiFact. Over the first six months of 2013, NumbersUSA spent more than $450,000 on television ads opposing an immigration reform bill that year.

== See also ==
- Federation for American Immigration Reform
