= List of Mellon family foundations =

The Mellon family foundations are a group of charitable foundations in the United States associated with the family of Thomas Mellon. The family is estimated to have a net worth of $14.1 billion as of 2024.

== Background ==
The Mellon family is a wealthy and influential family originally from Pittsburgh, Pennsylvania, U.S., and its vicinity. In addition to their foundation of BNY Mellon, they were also principal investors or majority owners of companies such as Alcoa, Gulf Oil, Koppers, Westinghouse, with major influence in Credit Suisse First Boston, General Motors, H.J. Heinz, Newsweek, Pittsburgh Tribune-Review and U.S. Steel. The Mellon family created trolly amusement parks in the late 1800s along their railway lines for public use. Both Kennywood and Idlewild Park remain in existence.

The family has also been known for using its wealth to support philanthropic work in the arts, education and conservation through various nonprofit organizations. It founded the National Gallery of Art and is a major patron to the University of Pittsburgh, Carnegie Mellon University and the University of Virginia. Individual members of the Mellon family have created private foundations and donated to museums and protected areas, including the creation of the Bollingen Foundation, the Rachel Mellon Walton Fund, and the Mellon Trust.

== Foundations ==
=== Richard King Mellon Foundation ===
The Richard King Mellon Foundation was created by Richard King Mellon in 1948. It primarily works in Pennsylvania to preserve and restore the area's natural environment. In 2001, the foundation donated two tracts of land, totaling 61,633 acres, to the Louisiana Department of Wildlife and Fisheries (LDWF) for the Maurepas Swamp WMA. Between 2001 and 2011 another 12,000 acres were gained through purchases and donations. In 2012, another 29,630 acres (The MC Davis Tract) was acquired from The Conservation Fund. Subsequent acquisitions of the Rathborne, Boyce, and Crusel tracts gave the WMA 122,098 acres. The foundation was reported to have $2.6 billion in total assets, $143 million in expenses and disbursements and $128 million in revenue as of 2023. It is considered one of the 50 largest foundations in the world.

=== Andrew W. Mellon Foundation ===
The Andrew W. Mellon Foundation is a private foundation established in 1969 following the merger of the Avalon Foundation and the Old Dominion Foundation. These two entities had been separately founded by Ailsa Mellon Bruce and Paul Mellon, the children of Andrew Mellon. The foundation's areas of interest include higher education (particularly the humanities), libraries and scholarly communication, information technology, museums and art conservation, the performing arts, and environmental conservation.

=== Scaife foundations ===
==== Allegheny Foundation ====
The Allegheny Foundation was established by Richard Mellon Scaife as a grant-making organization for "historic preservation, civic development and education". After his death, $364 million was left to the Allegheny Foundation. Its donations have gone to Point Park University for the Pittsburgh Playhouse, Saint Vincent College and the Extra Mile Education Foundation, among others. The organization is based in Pittsburgh, Pennsylvania.

==== Colcom Foundation ====
The Colcom Foundation was established by Cordelia Scaife May in 1996, where she was its chairman. Her philanthropic work centered around the intersection of environmentalism and population growth in the United States. It is headquartered in Pittsburgh, Pennsylvania and "supports conservation, environmental projects, and cultural assets" in the area. According to Mark Krikorian, the executive director of the Center for Immigration Studies, Colcom is among "the most important foundation donors to immigration-control organizations". The Colcom Foundation has been the target of protests in the Pittsburgh area due to its anti-immigration stance.

==== Laurel Foundation ====
The Laurel Foundation is based in Pittsburgh, Pennsylvania. It was established in 1951 by Cordelia Scaife May. The foundation's website lists its principal funding areas as "arts and culture, environment and conservation, vocational education, and community development/beautification". In 2003, the Laurel Foundation allocated $750,000 to acquire a George Washington manuscript at auction as well as a set of orders signed by British Major-General Edward Braddock. The foundation had also contributed to the PBS miniseries The War that Made America around that time.

==== Scaife Family Foundation ====
The Scaife Family Foundation was created by Jennie Scaife, and is "almost exclusively a supporter of animal welfare and other humanitarian issues." It was previously known for funding conservative groups and was among the largest contributors to the climate change denial movement from 2003 to 2010. It has also donated significant sums to the University of Pittsburgh.

==== Sarah Scaife Foundation ====
The Sarah Scaife Foundation funds politically conservative organizations and think tanks at the national and international level in areas such as economics and public policy. It has awarded more than $235 million to organizations such as the George C. Marshall Institute, Project for the New American Century, the Institute for Humane Studies, Reason Foundation, and Judicial Watch. The Carthage Foundation, which worked to influence public discourse and contribute to policy development with limited government, merged with the Sarah Scaife Foundation in 2014. It does not award grants to individuals.
