= Richard Mellon =

Richard Mellon may refer to:

- Richard B. Mellon (1858–1933), American banker, industrialist, and philanthropist
- Richard King Mellon (1899–1970), American financier, general, and philanthropist
