= Timothy Townsend =

Timothy Townsend may refer to:

- Timothy G. Townsend, American environmental engineer and professor
- Timothy Wesley Townsend (1844–1912), American photographer
