= Sarah Mellon =

American heiress and philanthropist (1903–1965)

Sarah Mellon Scaife
- Born: Sarah Cordelia Mellon; December 10, 1903; Pittsburgh, Pennsylvania, U.S.
- Died: December 28, 1965 (aged 62); Pittsburgh, Pennsylvania, U.S.
- Occupation: Philanthropist
- Organization: Sarah Scaife Foundation
- Children: Cordelia; Richard

Sarah Cordelia Mellon Scaife (December 10, 1903 – December 28, 1965) was an American heiress of the wealthy Mellon family. She was also a philanthropist and Republican Party donor. Her legacy includes the Sarah Scaife Foundation.

== Early life ==
Born on December 10, 1903, Sarah Cordelia Mellon was the daughter of Jennie Taylor Mellon (1870–1938; née King) and Richard B. Mellon (1858–1933), a noted banker, industrialist, and philanthropist.

Her paternal grandfather was Judge Thomas Mellon and her uncle was Andrew W. Mellon, a Secretary of the Treasury during the Great Depression and U.S. Ambassador to the Court of St. James'. She was one of the heirs to the Mellon fortune, including Mellon Bank and major investments in Gulf Oil and Alcoa. Her maternal grandparents were merchant Alexander King and Sarah Cordelia (née Smith) King.

In 1957, when Fortune prepared its first list of the wealthiest Americans, it estimated that Sarah Mellon, her brother Richard King Mellon, and her cousins Ailsa Mellon-Bruce and Paul Mellon were all amongst the richest eight people in the United States, with fortunes of between $400 and $700 million each.

== Personal life ==
In 1927, Sarah was married to industrialist Alan Magee Scaife (1900–1958), president and chair of the Scaife Company. The couple had two children:

- Cordelia Mellon Scaife (1928–2005), a reclusive philanthropist and founder of the Colcom Foundation. She was married for six months to Herbert Arthur May Jr. (1919–1969) before their divorce. In 1973 she married Allegheny County District Attorney Robert Duggan (1926–1974).
- Richard Mellon Scaife (1932–2014), billionaire owner–publisher of the Pittsburgh Tribune-Review and funder of conservative causes such as The Heritage Foundation, mostly through the vehicle of private foundations that he controlled such as the Sarah Scaife Foundation.

Sarah Mellon Scaife drank alcohol heavily, as did her adult children. Her husband died in 1958, and she died at West Penn Hospital on December 28, 1965. After a funeral at the East Liberty Presbyterian Church (built with funds from her family), she was buried at Allegheny Cemetery in Pittsburgh.

After her death, her collection of furniture and art was sold by Parke-Bernet in New York. Her jewelry was sold by William J. Fischer.

== Philanthropy ==
During her lifetime, Sarah Mellon Scaife donated tens of millions of dollars to a variety of humanitarian causes and the arts, including family planning, hospitals, disability and poverty issues, environmental conservation, and museums in the Pittsburgh region. Perhaps her most impactful gift was $35,000 to equip a virus research lab at the University of Pittsburgh during the late 1940s. Jonas Salk developed the polio vaccine in that lab in 1955.

In 1974, the Carnegie Museum of Art in Pittsburgh opened the Sarah Scaife Gallery, named in her honor following a major donation from the Sarah Scaife Foundation. Constructed at a cost of $12.5 million, the gallery more than doubled the exhibition space of the Museum of Art. Before her death, Scaife had collaborated with the museum to purchase a number of major works (especially Impressionist and Post-Impressionist art by Claude Monet, Edgar Degas, and other masters) for the museum's collection. Her son, Richard Mellon Scaife, chaired the museum's fine arts committee during the 1970s.

After Scaife's death, her son shifted the Scaife Foundations' giving away from the art world toward conservative and anti-immigration causes.
