= Mellon collection =

Mellon collection may refer to:

- the art collection of Andrew Mellon (1855–1937)
- the art collection of Paul Mellon (1907–1999)
