= Scaife Foundations =

Three nonprofit organizations in Pittsburgh, Pennsylvania, US

The Scaife Foundations refer collectively to three foundations in Pittsburgh, Pennsylvania: the Allegheny Foundation, the Sarah Scaife Foundation, and the Scaife Family Foundation. A fourth foundation, the Carthage Foundation, was folded into the Sarah Scaife Foundation in 2014. The Sarah Scaife Foundation and Scaife Family Foundation are major funders of American conservative causes.

== Allegheny Foundation ==
Richard Mellon Scaife endowed the foundation and served as its founding chairman. It "concentrates its giving in the Southwestern Pennsylvania area and confines most of its grant awards to programs for historic preservation, civic development and education."

When Scaife died in 2014, he left assets worth $364 million to the Allegheny Foundation. In 2015, the Allegheny Foundation distributed over $25 million to 81 different organizations. The foundation's largest donations went to Point Park University for the Pittsburgh Playhouse and the Center for Media Innovation. The Boys & Girls Club of Western Pennsylvania, Saint Vincent College, the Extra Mile Education Foundation, Goodwill of Southwestern Pennsylvania, and the Ligonier Valley YMCA all received gifts of $1 million or more.

The Foundation has EIN 25–6012303 as a 501(c)(3) Private Nonoperating Foundation; in 2024 it claimed $35,738,844 in revenue and total assets of $595,889,485.

== Sarah Scaife Foundation ==
The Sarah Scaife Foundation, named after Sarah Scaife, does not award grants to individuals. It concentrates its efforts towards politically conservative causes focused on public policy at a national and international level.

The organizations it has supported include the George C. Marshall Institute, Project for the New American Century, the Institute for Humane Studies, Reason Foundation, and Judicial Watch.

The foundation has EIN 25–1113452 as a 501(c)(3) Private Non-operating Foundation; in 2024 it claimed $28,045,542 in total revenue and $1,026,059,315 in total assets.

== Scaife Family Foundation ==
The Scaife Family Foundation has funded conservative causes. The Scaife Family Foundation has financially backed Reason magazine and the RealClearInvestigations website. According to Colin Schultz, writing for Smithsonian magazine in 2013, Scaife Foundations was among the largest contributors to the "climate change counter-movement" from 2003 to 2010.

The Scaife Family Foundation is controlled by Richard Mellon Scaife's daughter Jennie; who, according to 2014 article in Inside Philanthropy, shifted over time from funding conservative groups to becoming "almost exclusively a supporter of animal welfare and other humanitarian issues." The family foundation has donated significant sums to the University of Pittsburgh.

The foundation has EIN 25–1427015 as a 501(c)(3) Private Nonoperating Foundation; in 2024 it claimed $17,845,279 in total revenue and $176,749,400 in total assets. It lists its mission as "Grants to support and develop programs that strengthen families, address issues surrounding the health and welfare of women and children, promote animal welfare, and that demonstrate the beneficial interaction between humans and animals; Support also for conservation, and early intervention and prevention efforts in the area of drug and alcohol addiction."

== See also ==
- List of Mellon family foundations
