= Cordelia Scaife May =

American heiress and philanthropist (1928–2005)

- Born: Cordelia Mellon Scaife; September 24, 1928; Pittsburgh, Pennsylvania, U.S.
- Died: January 26, 2005 (aged 76); Ligonier Township, Pennsylvania, U.S.
- Education: Carnegie Institute of Technology, University of Pittsburgh
- Organization: Colcom Foundation
- Known for: Philanthropic and political donations
- Spouse(s): Herbert A. May Jr. (m. 1949; div. 1949) Robert Duggan (m. 1973; died 1974)
- Parents: Alan Magee Scaife (father); Sarah Cordelia Mellon Scaife (mother)
- Family: Mellon family

Cordelia Scaife May (September 24, 1928 – January 26, 2005) was an American Pittsburgh, Pennsylvania-area political donor and philanthropist. An heiress to the Mellon-Scaife family fortune, she was one of the wealthiest women in the United States. Her philanthropy and political causes included environmentalism, birth control and family planning; overpopulation control measures, making English the official language of the United States, and strict immigration restrictions to the United States. According to The New York Times, "she bankrolled the founding and operation of the nation’s three largest restrictionist groups—the Federation for American Immigration Reform, NumbersUSA and the Center for Immigration Studies," and she left the bulk of her assets to the Colcom Foundation, whose major activity has been the sponsorship of immigration restriction.

May lived a reclusive life, especially after the death of her second husband in 1974.

== Biography ==
=== Early life and education ===
On September 24, 1928, May was born as Cordelia Mellon Scaife in Pittsburgh, Pennsylvania. May's father was Alan Magee Scaife, and her mother was Sarah Cordelia Mellon Scaife. May's maternal grandfather was Richard B. Mellon. May is the grandniece of Andrew W. Mellon. May and her brother Richard Mellon Scaife grew up at the family estate in Ligonier, Pennsylvania. May attended Foxcroft School, a boarding school for girls. According to May, her childhood was largely unhappy; her "eccentric" mother Sarah was "...just a gutter drunk..." who let nannies do the work in raising her.

May attended Carnegie Institute of Technology, now known as Carnegie Mellon University, and the University of Pittsburgh briefly, but left school to get married.

=== Personal life ===
On June 30, 1949, Cordelia Scaife married Herbert A. May Jr. The marriage lasted only a few months; they soon divorced. After May's divorce, she resumed a childhood friendship with Robert Duggan. However, they were unable to be married for a long period of time, as both their families disapproved. To the wealthy and Protestant Mellons, Duggan was a lower-class Catholic beneath the family's stature; to Duggan's family, May was a divorcee ineligible for a Catholicism-sanctioned marriage. On August 29, 1973, Duggan and May secretly civilly married in Lake Tahoe, Nevada. Duggan was by then the Allegheny County District Attorney of Pennsylvania. The marriage was kept secret at first, but eventually leaked to the press. Duggan was under federal investigation by United States Attorney Dick Thornburgh for allegations of racketeering and corruption. On March 5, 1974, he was found dead of gunshot wounds hours before being indicted by a federal grand jury on charges of income tax evasion. His death was ruled a likely suicide but May maintained that he was murdered. The incident resulted in May falling out with her brother Richard, and by extension the family advisors that were shared between her and the family, as she came to the belief that her brother was somehow responsible for the death. Afterward, May lived reclusively, corresponding mostly by mail with new friends such as the activist John Tanton.

May's names for her home ("Cold Comfort") and her philanthropic foundation (Colcom Foundation) were inspired by the 1932 novel Cold Comfort Farm.

=== Death ===
On January 26, 2005, May died at her home, Cold Comfort Farm, in Ligonier Township, Pennsylvania at age 76, and was cremated. The cause of death was suicide by asphyxiation after a struggle with pancreatic cancer. She was survived by her estranged brother Richard, with whom she had partially reconciled in 1999.

== Political and philanthropic donations ==
May made charitable donations to land conservation, watershed protection, environmental education, and population causes. When her mother died in 1965, May inherited a sizable portion of the Mellon fortune. She would distribute tens of millions of dollars to charity through the Laurel Foundation, Colcom Foundation (established 1996), and directly, most on the condition her name be kept private. Most of the Colcom Foundation's donations go to anti-immigration causes.

May was routinely listed on the Forbes list of the wealthiest Americans; in 2004, the year before her death, she had a net worth of $825 million and was #363 on Forbes' list of wealthiest Americans.

In 1951, May established Laurel Foundation, a private foundation based in Pittsburgh, Pennsylvania. In 1996, May established Colcom Foundation. May served as the chairman of both foundations until her death in 2005. In the year 1972, May was the single largest contributor to candidates running for Congress.

In 2005, the year of her death, May gave more to charity than any other individual in the United States. Her charitable donations for the year were almost one-tenth of the $4.3 billion donated by the nation's leading philanthropists.

=== Pittsburgh area initiatives ===
May's largesse helped fund a number of projects in the Pittsburgh area, including the Pittsburgh National Aviary, the Montour Trail, the Riverlife Task Force, the Pittsburgh Parks Conservancy, and the Women's Center & Shelter of Greater Pittsburgh.

=== Population control ===
May became aware of overpopulation issues in childhood, when she was introduced to the work of Margaret Sanger by her grandmother. By 1952 she began to actively address national population issues. There is a bust of Margaret Sanger in the National Portrait Gallery which was a gift from May. By 1974, she had resigned from Planned Parenthood, based on her view that family planning was a waste of money in the presence of massive immigration.

=== Anti-immigration ===
May opposed immigration. She argued the United States was "being invaded on all fronts" by immigrants who "breed like hamsters" and exhaust America's resources. Her anti-immigration activism began in the 1970s.

May's contributions, both directly and through her foundations, have principally funded anti-immigrant initiatives, including the Federation for American Immigration Reform (FAIR), the Center for Immigration Studies, the American Immigration Control Foundation, Californians for Population Stabilization, the California Coalition for Immigration Reform, and Numbers USA. The Center for Immigration Studies is listed as a hate group by the Southern Poverty Law Center. The Los Angeles Times reported that Scaife May was the single largest donor to anti-immigrant causes and "An ardent environmentalist more comfortable with books and birds than with high-society galas, May believed nature was under siege from runaway population growth. Before her death in 2005, she devoted much of her wealth to rolling back the tide--backing birth control and curbing immigration, both legal and illegal." The Times also wrote that May donated $200,000 to conservative columnist Samuel T. Francis, who called for a halt to all immigration and who opposes the mixing of the races.

May also supported English-only movements, guided by John Tanton. Originally that was through the group U.S. English, which successfully lobbied for an Arizona ballot proposition to conduct all state business in English. After Tanton was kicked out of the group for memos that endorsed eugenics and denounced a "Latin onslaught", Tanton founded a new group, ProEnglish. May was a prominent funder for ProEnglish, in keeping with Tanton. According to Roger Conner, the first chairman of FAIR, "John [Tanton] became the one who would carry her legacy forward the way a son or a daughter would... John assured her what she believed in her life would carry on.

She also funded the republication and distribution of the dystopian novel The Camp of the Saints in 1983, a novel popular among the far right and widely described as racist by critics; the Southern Poverty Law Center has compared it to The Turner Diaries.

== See also ==
- Mellon family
