= Roy Hunt =

Roy Hunt may refer to:

- J. Roy Hunt (1884–1972), American motion picture cameraman and cinematographer
- Roy Arthur Hunt (1881–1966), American multi-millionaire and president of the aluminium company Alcoa
