= Ulster American Folk Park =

Open air museum

- Daonpháirc Uladh-Mheiriceá (Irish); Ulstèr Merikay Fowk Pairk (Ulster-Scots)
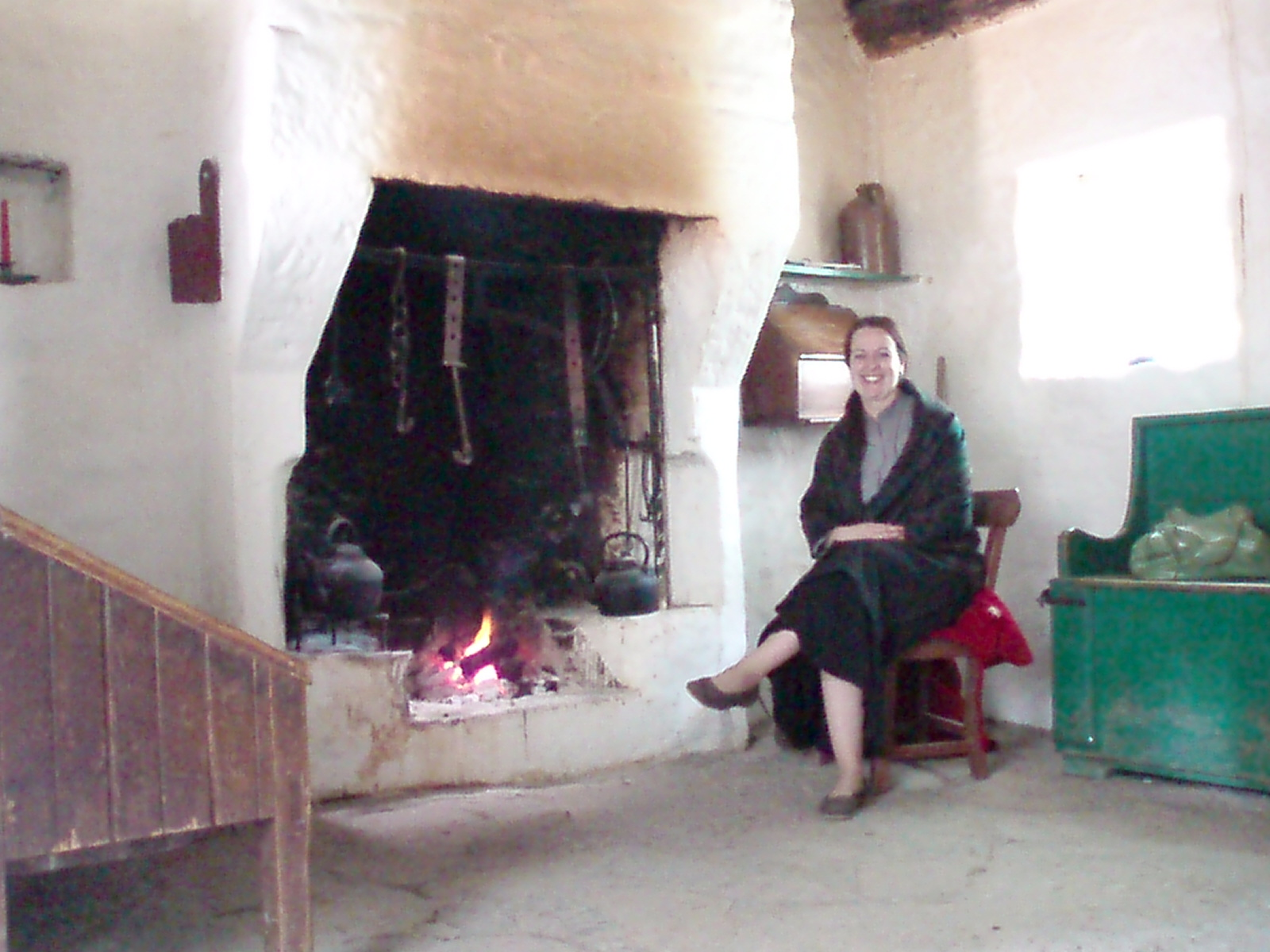
- One of the costumed guides in 2006

- Location within Northern Ireland
- Established: 1976
- Location: Castletown, Northern Ireland
- Coordinates: 54°39′32.58″N 7°20′5.03″W
- Visitors: 78,193 (2025)
- Website: https://www.ulsteramericanfolkpark.org/

The Ulster American Folk Park is an open-air museum near Omagh, in County Tyrone, Northern Ireland. With more than 30 exhibit buildings, the museum tells the story of three centuries of Irish emigration. Using costumed guides and displays of traditional crafts, the museum focuses on those who left Ulster for America in the 18th, 19th and 20th centuries. The museum is part of National Museums Northern Ireland.

Within the museum there are many restored, original buildings with connections to local families. The park was developed around the Mellon House, the birthplace of Irish-American banker and lawyer Thomas Mellon, founding father of the Mellon banking dynasty. This house and its outbuildings remain in their original location. Visitors can taste samples of traditional Irish and pioneer American foods including freshly baked soda bread and pumpkin pie all made on the hearths and griddles of the exhibit buildings. The museum also includes agricultural displays and an array of farm animals.

The park is open throughout the year, excluding some public holidays.

== History ==
The park developed from the restoration of the Mellon family homestead at Camp Hill Cottage in Castletown, the birthplace of the banker and judge Thomas Mellon, who had emigrated to Pennsylvania as a child in 1818. The restoration followed an approach from Matthew Mellon, a grandson of Thomas Mellon, and the ancestral home was opened to the public in 1968. The site was developed into an open-air museum by Eric Montgomery, a Northern Ireland civil servant who became the folk park's first director, and the park opened in 1976. Buildings of typical or particular significance from both Ulster and North America were dismantled at their original locations and rebuilt on the site.

== Theme ==
The demonstrations that take place showcase the day-to-day tasks and skills of those who lived in the era such as blacksmithing, candle-dipping, embroidery, spinning, printing, and open hearth cooking. The museum runs a lively programme of events and exhibitions that connect to their collections. The museum has also hosted many international exhibitions in recent years including Fighting Irishmen from the Irish Arts Center in New York which showcased the influence of Irish emigrants in the sport of boxing, and Warriors of the Plains from the British Museum, which explored the Indigenous peoples of North America. Special events mark the culture of both the New World and the Old World, such as U.S. Independence Day, Halloween, Easter and of course Saint Patrick's Day. The melting pot of emigrant music is celebrated with a three-day Bluegrass Music Festival every September.

The museum's visitor centre houses a cafe and shop as well as the permanent exhibition Emigrants that introduces the story of emigration from Ireland to America, before visitors embark on their journey around the outdoor museum and along the emigrant trail. Free parking is available on site.

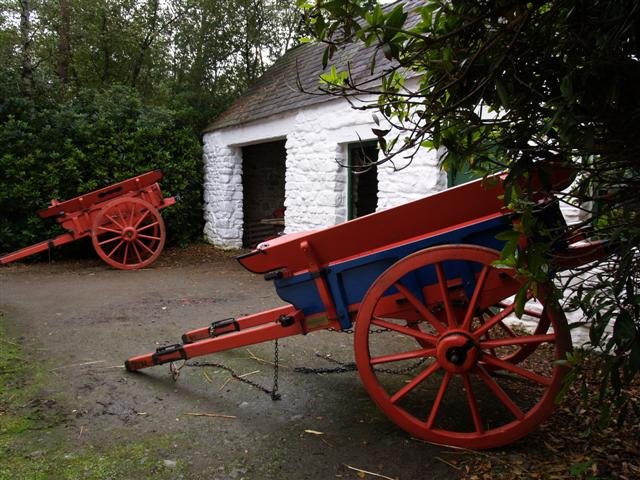
one of the many cottage houses located at the Ulster American Folk Park

== Sections ==
=== Research and education ===
The entrance section includes a restaurant, a visitors' information centre and the Mellon Centre for Migration Studies (MCMS). The MCMS has an attached library and offers, in conjunction with the University of Ulster and Queen's University of Belfast, postgraduate and undergraduate courses, as well as tailored and shorter courses; all of the courses concern the study of Irish migration from 1600 to the present day. The specialist research library contains some 10,000 volumes, over 50 periodicals, maps, audio-visual material, and a collection of primary source documents (the Irish Emigration Database) which is searchable on computer. The centre is open to visitors during basic office hours, and closed during public holidays.

=== Old World ===
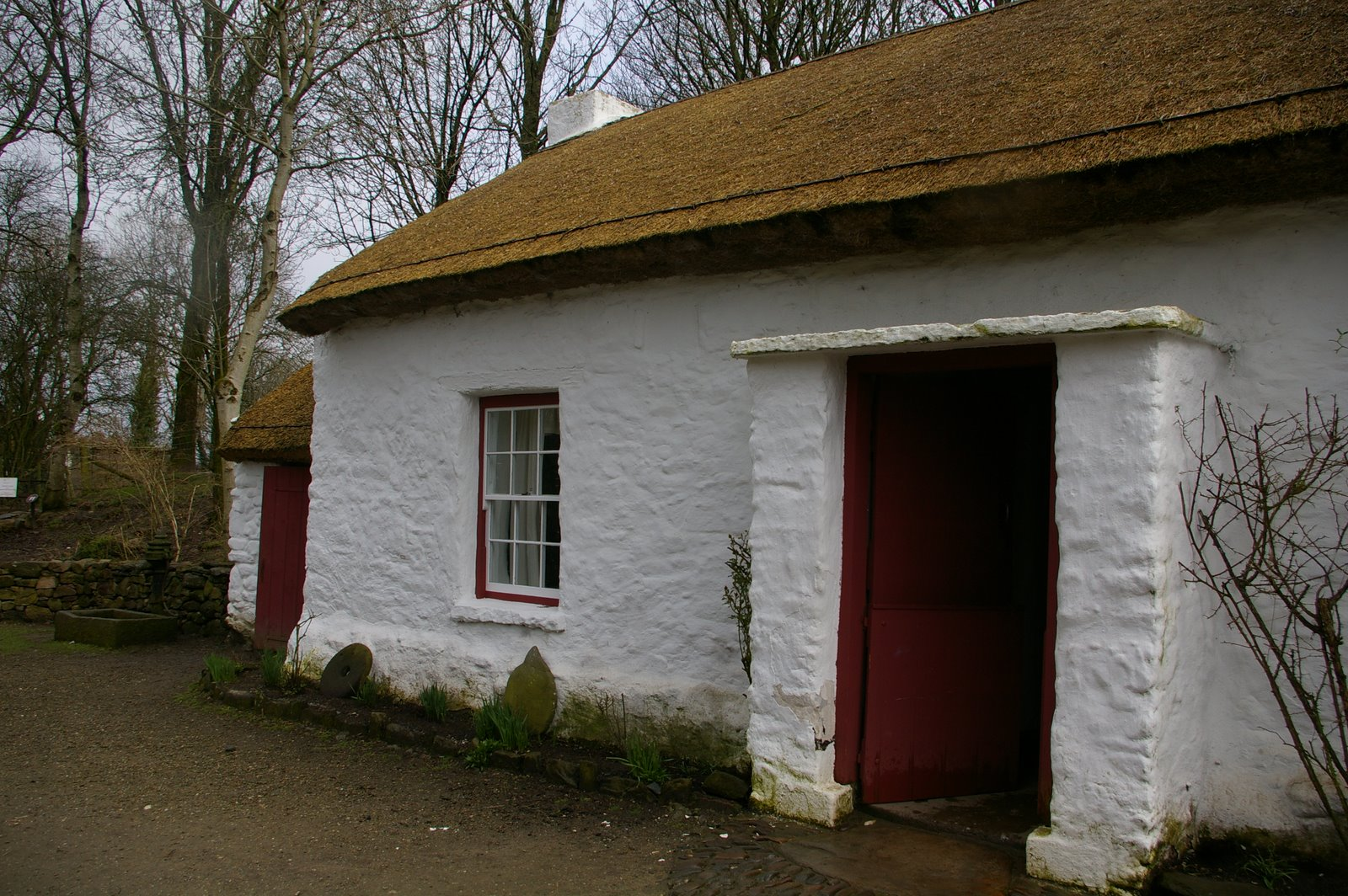
Mellon House is the birthplace of Thomas Mellon

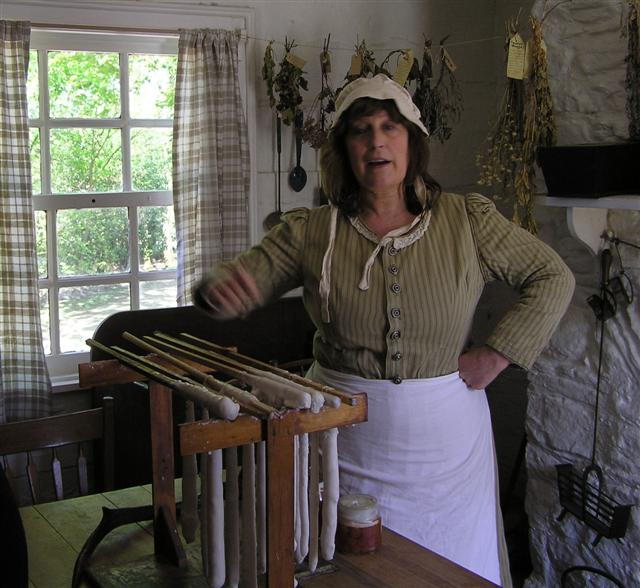
The lady of the house, amongst other things she is demonstrating how wax candles are home-made

The Old World region includes whole streets of original houses, an original printing press, a bank, an old police barracks, the old Castletown National School, and two churches. Central to this region is the boyhood home of Thomas Mellon, judge and founder of the Pittsburgh banking dynasty.

Some of the two-up, two-down houses in one of the reconstructed streets in the park were transported, in their entirety, from Sandy Row, off the Donegall Road in Belfast, and other buildings have been transported from elsewhere in the province.

=== New World ===
Linking the Old and New World sections of the park is the Ship and Dockside gallery, which includes the Brig Union, a full-size replica of an immigrant sailing ship.

The historic atmosphere continues in the New World area, which features a recreated old American street with a tinsmith display and the original interior of a Virginia general store. Beyond the street, the frontier journey begins with a stop at the 1720s Fulton stone house, painstakingly dismantled in Lancaster County, Pennsylvania, and rebuilt here. Other original frontier houses in the park include an Appalachian log house from Washington county, Pennsylvania, the 1830 West Virginia home of Richard McCallister, removed from Cabell county, and a brick plantation house built by Francis Rogan in the early 19th century near Nashville, Tennessee.

== Redevelopment ==
In March 2025, the Northern Ireland communities minister Gordon Lyons announced more than £750,000 for a project titled "Ulster American Folk Park: The Journey Ahead", described by the Department for Communities as the first step towards unlocking over £20 million through the Mid South West Growth Deal. The announcement was made at the Smithsonian National Museum of American History in Washington. The project is intended to modernise the museum's welcome centre and update interpretation and displays across the open-air site.

== See also ==
- Frontier Culture Museum, Virginia, USA
- Public Record Office of Northern Ireland
- Ulster Folk and Transport Museum
- Ulster Museum
- Ulster Scots people
- National Museums Northern Ireland
