= List of richest Americans in history =

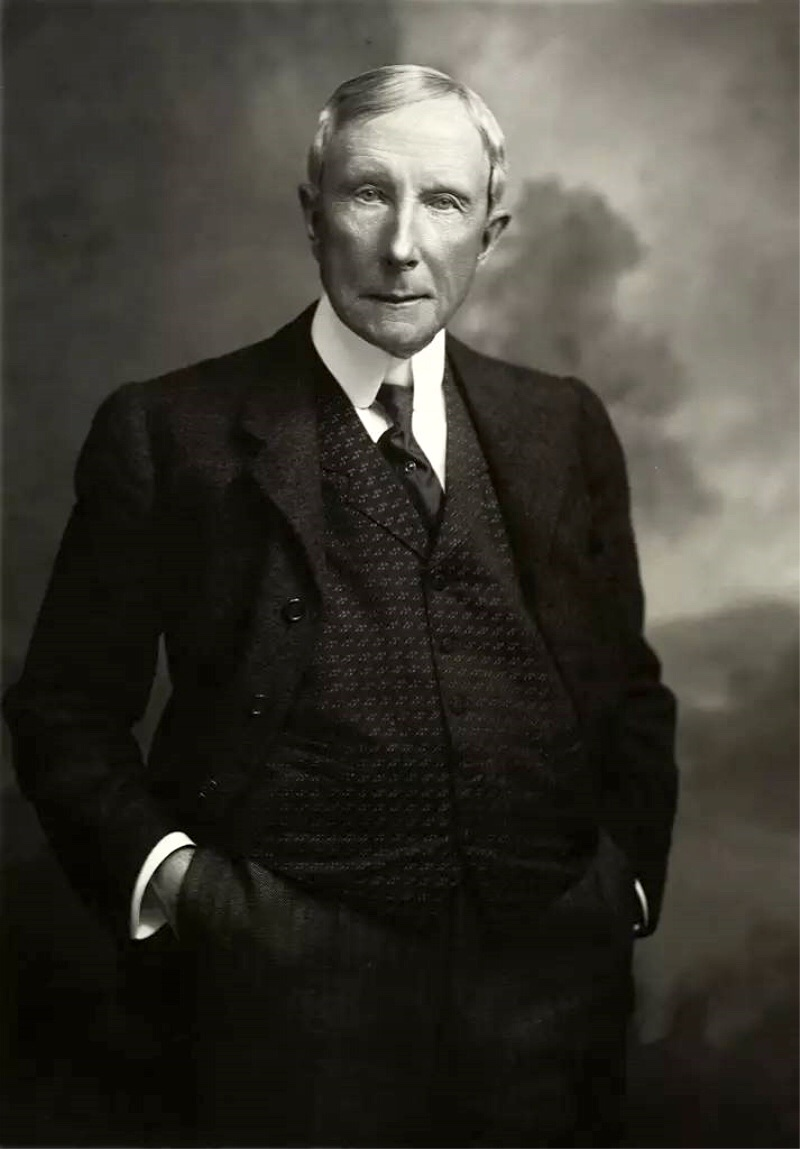
Business magnate and philanthropist John D. Rockefeller is sometimes considered the wealthiest American in history.

Comparing wealth of individuals across large spans of time is difficult, as the value of money and assets is heavily dependent on the time period. There are various methods of comparing individuals' wealth across time, including using simple inflation-adjusted totals or calculating an individual's wealth as a share of contemporary gross domestic product (GDP). For this reason, there is not one decisive ranking of the richest Americans in history.

Many sources cite John D. Rockefeller (1839–1937) as the richest person in the history of the United States; however, this result comes not from adjusting his wealth for inflation, but by comparing his wealth to the size of the American economy at that time. Since the economy was relatively small during his time period, his wealth represented a larger portion of the total economy. For example, economic blogger Scott Sumner noted in 2018 that Rockefeller was worth $1.4 billion when he died in 1937, equivalent to about $24 billion in dollars in 2018 when adjusting for inflation. Meanwhile, Bill Gates in 1999 was worth nearly $150 billion in dollars adjusted to 2018.

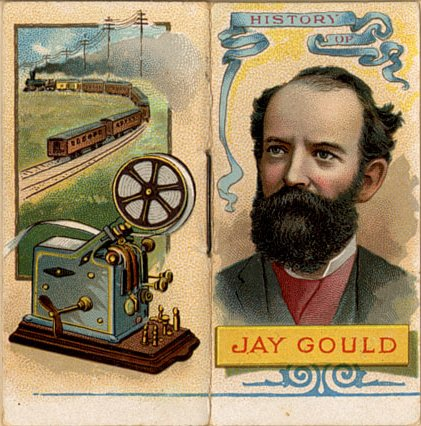
"History of Jay Gould," part of the set of 50 cigarette card-size booklets, Histories of Poor Boys Who Became Rich and Other Famous People, published by W. Duke, Sons & Co. in 1888. The set also included, among others, booklets on Andrew Carnegie, John J. Astor, and Cornelius Vanderbilt.

The second-richest person in terms of wealth compared to contemporary GDP is a subject of dispute. While most sources attribute this status to Andrew Carnegie, others argue that it could be Bill Gates, Cornelius Vanderbilt I, John Jacob Astor, or Henry Ford. Determining the lower ranks is an even more contentious debate. Vanderbilt left a fortune worth $100 million upon his death in 1877, equivalent to $2.4 billion today. As the United States became the world's leading economic power by the late 19th century, the wealthiest people in the country were often also the wealthiest people in the world.

== Fortune's wealthiest Americans (1957) ==
In 1957, Fortune magazine developed a list of the seventy-six wealthiest Americans, which was published in many American newspapers. Jean Paul Getty, when asked his reaction to being named wealthiest American and whether he was worth a billion dollars, said, "You know, if you can count your money, you don't have a billion dollars" and then added, "But remember, a billion dollars isn't worth what it used to be."

The second category, the second to eighth richest individuals, included Andrew Mellon's son, daughter, niece, and nephew. Wealthiest Americans included a total of seven members of the Rockefeller family, five members of the Ford family, four members of the Du Pont family (and a non-family DuPont executive), and four General Motors executives.

=== $700,000,000 to $1,000,000,000 ===
- Jean Paul Getty, Oil; business headquarters is in Los Angeles, California.

=== $400,000,000 to $700,000,000 ===
- Ailsa Mellon Bruce, New York, New York; inherited wealth: Gulf Oil Company, Alcoa.
- Arthur Vining Davis, Pittsburgh, Pennsylvania; Alcoa, Florida real estate.
- H. L. Hunt, Dallas, Texas; independent oil operator.
- Paul Mellon, Upperville, Virginia; inherited wealth.
- Richard King Mellon, Pittsburgh, Pennsylvania; inherited wealth: Alcoa, Gulf Oil, Mellon Bank, etc.
- John D. Rockefeller Jr., New York; inherited wealth: Standard Oil Trust.
- Sarah Mellon, Pittsburgh; inherited wealth.

=== $200,000,000 to $400,000,000 ===
- Irénée du Pont, Wilmington, Delaware and Cuba; inherited wealth: E. I du Pont de Nemours & Co.
- William du Pont Jr., Wilmington; inherited wealth: E. I du Pont de Nemours & Co.
- Mrs. Frederick Guest, the former Amy Phipps, Palm Beach, Florida; inherited wealth from father Henry Phipps Jr., a Carnegie Steel executive.
- Howard Hughes, Los Angeles; inherited wealth: Hughes Tool Company.
- Joseph P. Kennedy, Boston, Massachusetts and New York; real estate.
- Daniel K. Ludwig, New York; National Bulk Carriers.
- Sid Richardson, Fort Worth, Texas; independent Oil operator.
- Alfred P. Sloan, Jr., New York; General Motors Corporation.

=== $100,000,000 to $200,000,000 ===
- James Abercrombie, Houston, Texas; independent oil operator.
- Vincent Astor, New York; inherited wealth: real estate.
- Stephen Bechtel, San Francisco; construction, Bechtel Corporation.
- William Blakley, Dallas; Braniff Airways, real estate.
- Jacob Blaustein, Baltimore, Maryland; American Oil Company.
- Lammot du Pont Copeland, Wilmington; E. I du Pont de Nemours & Co.
- Clarence Dillon, New York; Dillon, Read & Co.
- Doris Duke, New York and New Jersey; inherited wealth: tobacco.
- Mrs. Alfred I. du Pont, Jacksonville, Florida and Wilmington; inherited wealth: St. Joe Paper Company, E. I du Pont de Nemours & Co.
- Mr. Edsel Ford, Detroit, Michigan; inherited wealth: Ford Motor Company.
- Amory Houghton, Ambassador to France; inherited wealth: Corning Glass.
- Arthur A. Houghton Jr., New York; Corning Glass.
- Roy Arthur Hunt, Pittsburgh; Alcoa.
- William Keck, Los Angeles; Superior Oil.
- Charles F. Kettering, Dayton, Ohio; General Motors Corporation.
- Mrs. Jean Mauzé, the former Abby Rockefeller, New York; inherited wealth: Standard Oil Trust.
- Mrs. Chauncey McCormick, the former Marion Deering, Chicago, Illinois; inherited wealth.
- William L. McKnight, St. Paul, Minnesota; Minnesota Mining & Manufacturing.
- John W. Mecom Sr., Houston; independent oil operator.
- Clint Murchison, Dallas; independent oil operator.
- Mrs. Charles Payson, the former Joan Whitney, New York; inherited wealth.
- John L. Pratt, Fredericksburg, Virginia; General Motors Corporation.
- David Rockefeller, New York; Chase Manhattan Bank and inherited wealth: Standard Oil Trust.
- John D. Rockefeller 3rd, New York; inherited wealth: Standard Oil Trust.
- Laurance Rockefeller, New York; venture capital: Eastern Air Lines, Reaction Motors, International Nickel and inherited wealth: Standard Oil Trust.
- Nelson Rockefeller, New York; Rockefeller Center,-, Inc., International Basic Economy Corporation and inherited wealth: Standard Oil Trust.
- Winthrop Rockefeller, Arkansas; ranching, Ibec Housing and inherited wealth: Standard Oil Trust.
- R. E. Smith, Houston; independent oil operator.
- John Hay Whitney, New York, Ambassador to Britain; venture capital and inherited wealth.

=== $75,000,000 to $100,000,000 ===
- Michael Late Benedum, Pittsburgh and West Virginia; Benedum-Trees Oil Company, Hiawatha Oil and Gas, etc.
- Donaldson Brown, Port Deposit, Maryland; E. I du Pont de Nemours & Co.
- George R. Brown, Houston; Brown & Root, Inc.
- Herman Brown, Houston; Brown & Root, Inc.
- John Nicholas Brown I, Newport, Rhode Island; inherited wealth: real estate.
- Godfrey L. Cabot, Boston; Godfrey L. Cabot, Inc., etc.
- James A. Chapman, Tulsa, Oklahoma; inherited: wealth: oil.
- Leo Corrigan, Dallas; real estate.
- Mrs. Horace Dodge, Jr., Palm Beach and Detroit; inherited wealth: automobiles.
- John T. Dorrance, Jr., Philadelphia, Pennsylvania; inherited wealth: Campbell's.
- Benson Ford, Detroit; inherited wealth: Ford Motor Company.
- Henry Ford II, Detroit; inherited wealth: Ford Motor Company.
- William C. Ford, Detroit; inherited wealth: Ford Motor Company.
- Erle P. Halliburton, Duncan, Oklahoma; Halliburton Oil Well Cementing Company (died in Los Angeles Oct. 13, 1957).
- Averell Harriman, Albany, New York, Governor of New York; inherited wealth: investment banking.
- Henry J. Kaiser, Oakland, California; Kaiser Industries, etc.
- John W. Kieckhefer, Milwaukee, Wisconsin and Prescott, Arizona; Kieckhefer Container, Eddy Paper (absorbed by Weyerhaeuser).
- Robert J. Kleberg Jr., King Ranch, Texas; inherited wealth: cattle, oil, land.
- John E. Mabee, Tulsa; independent oil operator.
- John D. MacArthur, Chicago; Bankers Life and Casualty Company.
- A. H. Meadows, Dallas; General American Oil.
- Charles S. Mott, Flint, Michigan; General Motors Corporation.
- John M. Olin, Alton, Illinois; inherited wealth: Olin Mathieson Chemical.
- Spencer T. Olin, Alton, Ill.; inherited wealth: Olin Mathieson Chemical.
- J. Howard Pew, Philadelphia; inherited wealth: Sun Oil Company.
- Joseph Pew, Philadelphia; inherited wealth: Sun Oil.
- Marjorie Merriweather Post, Washington, DC; inherited wealth: General Foods.
- James Sottile Jr., Miami; Pan American Bank.
- George W. Strake, Houston; inherited wealth: independent oil operator.
- Louis Wolfson, Miami Beach, Florida; Merritt-Chapman & Scott, New York Shipbuilding, etc.
- Robert Woodruff, Atlanta, Georgia; The Coca-Cola Company.

== Klepper and Gunther (1996) ==
In the 1996 book The Wealthy 100, authors Michael Klepper and Robert Gunther placed John D. Rockefeller atop the list of the richest Americans in history, followed by Cornelius Vanderbilt and John Jacob Astor. Bill Gates was the top living person, coming in fifth.

== American Heritage (1998) ==
American Heritage magazine published the following list of 40 richest Americans ever in 1998, subtitling it "Surprise: Only three of them are alive today". The list was compiled by taking each person's wealth at death, adding the amount given away during his lifetime, and expressing the total as a fraction of the nation's GDP at the time.

1. John D. Rockefeller
2. Andrew Carnegie
3. Cornelius Vanderbilt
4. John Jacob Astor
5. Bill Gates
6. Stephen Girard
7. Alexander Turney Stewart
8. Frederick Weyerhauser
9. Jay Gould
10. Marshall Field
11. Sam Walton
12. Henry Ford
13. Warren Buffett
14. Andrew W. Mellon
15. Richard B. Mellon
16. James Graham Fair
17. William Weightman
18. Moses Taylor
19. Russell Sage
20. John Insley Blair
21. Cyrus H. K. Curtis
22. Paul Allen
23. J. P. Morgan
24. E. H. Harriman
25. Henry Huddleston Rogers
26. Oliver Hazard Payne
27. Henry Clay Frick
28. Collis Potter Huntington
29. Peter Arrell Browne Widener
30. Nicholas Longworth
31. Philip Danforth Armour
32. James Clair Flood
33. Mark Hopkins Jr.
34. Edward Cabot Clark
35. Leland Stanford
36. Hetty Green
37. James J. Hill
38. William Rockefeller
39. Elias Hasket Derby
40. Claus Spreckels

== Bernstein and Swan (2008) ==
Bernstein and Swan in All the Money in the World (2008) mention the 15 richest Americans in history.

1. John D. Rockefeller
2. Andrew Carnegie
3. Cornelius Vanderbilt
4. John Jacob Astor
5. Stephen Girard
6. Richard B. Mellon
7. A. T. Stewart
8. Frederick Weyerhäuser
9. Marshall Field
10. Sam Walton
11. Jay Gould
12. Henry Ford
13. Bill Gates
14. Andrew W. Mellon
15. Warren Buffett

== Business Insider (2011) ==
Business Insider agreed on Rockefeller in first, but placed Andrew Carnegie second, followed by Vanderbilt, and Gates.

1. John D. Rockefeller
2. Andrew Carnegie
3. Cornelius Vanderbilt
4. Bill Gates
5. John Jacob Astor
6. Stephen Girard
7. A. T. Stewart
8. Frederick Weyerhäuser
9. Jay Gould
10. Stephen Van Rensselaer
11. Marshall Field
12. Sam Walton
13. Warren Buffett

== CNN Money (2014) ==
The following is a list compiled by CNN Money in 2014.

1. John D. Rockefeller
2. Cornelius Vanderbilt
3. John Jacob Astor
4. Stephen Girard
5. Richard Mellon
6. Andrew Carnegie
7. Stephen Van Rensselaer
8. A. T. Stewart
9. Frederick Weyerhäuser
10. Jay Gould
11. Marshall Field
12. Bill Gates
13. Henry Ford
14. Warren Buffett
15. Andrew Mellon
16. Sam Walton
17. Moses Taylor
18. Russell Sage
19. James G. Fair
20. William Weightman

== By half decade ==
This list names the richest American by half decade starting in 1770.

Year	Name	Picture
1770	Peter Manigault	
1775	Robert Morris	
1780	William Bingham	
1785	Benjamin Franklin	
1790	John Hancock	
1795	Elias Hasket Derby	
1800	Thomas Willing	
1805	Stephen Girard	
1810	Stephen Girard	
1815	Stephen Girard	
1820	Stephen Girard	
1825	Stephen Girard	
1830	Stephen Girard	
1835	Stephen Van Rensselaer	
1840	John Jacob Astor	
1845	John Jacob Astor	
1850	Cornelius Vanderbilt	
1855	Cornelius Vanderbilt	
1860	Cornelius Vanderbilt	
1865	Cornelius Vanderbilt	
1870	Cornelius Vanderbilt	
1875	Cornelius Vanderbilt	
1880	William Henry Vanderbilt	
1885	William Henry Vanderbilt	
1890	John D. Rockefeller	
1895	John D. Rockefeller	
1900	Andrew Carnegie	
1905	Andrew Carnegie	
1910	John D. Rockefeller	
1915	John D. Rockefeller	
1920	Henry Ford	
1925	Henry Ford	
1930	Andrew Mellon	
1935	Andrew Mellon	
1940	Henry Ford	
1945	Henry Ford	
1950	H. L. Hunt	
1955	J. Paul Getty	
1960	Howard Hughes	
1965	Howard Hughes	
1970	Howard Hughes	
1975	Howard Hughes	
1980	Daniel Ludwig	
1985	Sam Walton	
1990	John Kluge	
1995	Bill Gates	
2000	Bill Gates	
2005	Bill Gates	
2010	Bill Gates	
2015	Bill Gates	
2020	Jeff Bezos	
2025	Elon Musk	
