= Ninemile Island (Pennsylvania) =

Coordinates: 40°29′26″N 79°51′11″W

Ninemile Island is an alluvial island in the Allegheny River in the city of Penn Hills, Pennsylvania. It lies southeast of, and parallel to the larger Sycamore Island, which lies in the borough of Blawnox, Allegheny County in the U.S. state of Pennsylvania.
