= Judy Egerton =

British art historian and curator

Judith Egerton
- Born: Judith Emilie Egerton; August 7, 1928; Melbourne, Australia
- Died: March 21, 2012 (aged 83)
- Occupations: Art historian, curator
- Known for: Specialist in 18th-century British art Catalogue raisonné of George Stubbs Exhibitions at Tate Gallery and Yale Centre
- Spouse: Ansell Egerton (m. 1949, div. 1974)
- Children: 2 daughters

Judith Emilie Egerton (7 August 1928 – 21 March 2012) was an Australian-born British art historian and curator. She specialised in eighteenth-century British art and, particularly, the work of George Stubbs.

== Early life and career ==
Egerton was born in Melbourne, Australia as the third of five children to Jean (née Muecke) and Keith Attiwill, a journalist. She was educated at Lauriston Girls' School and, from the age of 17, at Janet Clarke Hall, then the women's college of the University of Melbourne, where she read History and graduated with first-class honours in 1948. She married Ansell Egerton in 1949 (dissolved in 1974) and the couple emigrated to the United Kingdom, briefly living in Oxford.

When her husband became a Lecturer in Economics at Queen's University Belfast, she held the post of tutorial assistant in History. While in Belfast, she became a close friend of the poet Philip Larkin, who was then a sub-librarian at the university. The Egertons returned to London in 1956. While raising her two daughters, Egerton worked on the British Dictionary of National Biography and the Australian Dictionary of Biography.

== Later career ==
In London, Egerton came into contact with the watercolour specialist Dudley Snelgrove with whom she worked in the late 1960s, cataloguing the sporting art pictures being bought by Paul Mellon. It was during this period that Egerton became interested in the work of George Stubbs.

Egerton was appointed as a Research Assistant Grade I of the British school at the Tate Gallery in 1974, being promoted to Assistant Keeper Grade I by 1980. She was responsible for curating the exhibition George Stubbs, Anatomist and Animal Painter, which opened in August 1976, and concerned his anatomical drawings. Egerton wrote the catalogue raisonné on Stubbs, published by the Paul Mellon Centre in 1984, and curated the major exhibition on the artist which was held from 1984 into 1985 at the Tate and the Yale Centre for British Art in Connecticut. She remained at the Tate until 1988.

Egerton also worked on well-known British artists Joseph Wright of Derby and William Hogarth. She curated a show at the Tate Gallery in 1990 on Wright of Derby and worked with Hogarth expert, Elizabeth Einberg, on compiling a catalogue of the Tate's permanent collection of Hogarth artworks titled The Age of Hogarth. She also wrote Hogarth's Marriage-A-La-Mode, which was re-published by Yale University press in 2011 with an accompanying DVD narrated by Alan Bennett.

Egerton was employed by the National Gallery from 1988 to 1998 to revise the British school catalogue and became a senior research fellow of the Paul Mellon Centre for Studies in British Art from 1997 until 2007.

== Archive ==
The Judy Egerton Archive was donated to the Paul Mellon Centre by her daughters in 2012. It contains the research notes, correspondence and images she compiled during the course of her work on the publications and exhibitions concerning the artists Stubbs, Hogarth, Turner and Wright of Derby. The archive is available for public consultation.

== Exhibitions ==
- Joseph Wright of Derby, Tate Gallery, 1990
- Stubbs, Tate Gallery & Yale Centre for British Art, 1984-5
- George Stubbs, Anatomist and Animal Painter, Tate Gallery, 1976
- The Age of Hogarth, Tate Gallery

== Publications ==
- George Stubbs, painter: catalogue raisonné (Paul Mellon Centre by Yale University Press, 2007)
- The British School (National Gallery, 1998)
- D. Davies, F. Luard & J. Egerton, Hogarth's Marriage A-la-Mode (National Gallery, 1997)
- Turner: The Fighting Temeraire (National Gallery, 1995)
- Wright of Derby (Tate Gallery, c1990)
- J. Egerton & E. Einberg, The Age of Hogarth: British Painters Born 1675-1709 (Tate Gallery with the assistance of J. Paul Getty Trust, 1988)
- J. Egerton & C. Newall, George Price Boyce (Tate Gallery, 1987)
- British Watercolours (Tate Gallery, 1986)
- British Sporting Paintings: the Paul Mellon Collection in the Virginia Museum of Fine Art (Virginia Museum of Fine Art, c1985)
- Stubbs: Portraits in Detail (Tate Gallery, 1984)
- George Stubbs 1724-1806 (Tate Gallery, 1984)
- The Ingenious Mr Seymour: James Seymour, 1702-1752 (British Sporting Art Trust, 1978)
- J. Egerton & D. Snelgrove, British Sporting and Animal Drawings c.1500-1850 (Tate Gallery for Yale Center for British Art, 1978)
- British Sporting and Animal Paintings 1655-1867 (Tate Gallery for Yale Center for British Art, 1978)
- Drawings and Paintings by Sir Thomas Monnington PRA, 1902-1976 (Royal Academy of Arts, 1977)
- George Stubbs: Anatomist and Animal Painter (Tate Gallery Publications, 1976)
