= Andrew W. Mellon Foundation =

Private foundation in New York City

Mellon Foundation
- The Andrew W. Mellon Foundation
- Founded: June 30, 1969; 57 years ago
- Founder: Paul Mellon; Ailsa Mellon Bruce
- Purpose: Higher education Museums and art conservation Performing arts Conservation
- Location: 140 E. 62nd St., New York City, U.S.
- Method: Grants
- Key people: Elizabeth Alexander (President)
- Revenue: $380,179,226 (2015)
- Expenses: $331,375,744 (2015)
- Endowment: $6.1 billion
- Website: www.mellon.org

The Andrew W. Mellon Foundation, commonly known as the Mellon Foundation, is a New York City-based private foundation with wealth accumulated by Andrew Mellon of the Mellon family of Pittsburgh, Pennsylvania. It is the product of the 1969 merger of the Avalon Foundation and the Old Dominion Foundation. These foundations had been set up separately by Ailsa Mellon Bruce and Paul Mellon, the children of Andrew Mellon.

The foundation is housed in New York City in the expanded former offices of the Bollingen Foundation, another educational philanthropy once supported by Paul Mellon.

In 2004, the foundation was awarded the National Medal of Arts.

== Areas of interest ==
- Higher education, including the humanities, libraries, and scholarly communication and information technology
- Museums and art conservation
- Performing arts
- Conservation and the environment

The Atlantic described the foundation, with its $540 million grant budget in 2024, as more influential over the fiscal direction and cultural output of American humanities than any other single entity, including the federal government.

== Organization ==
In June 2020, the foundation announced a major strategic shift declaring that it would prioritise social justice in its grantmaking. The foundation's mission statement describes its goal as building "just communities enriched by meaning and guided by critical thinking."

Mellon's research group has investigated doctoral education, collegiate admissions, independent research libraries, charitable nonprofits, scholarly communications, and other issues to ensure that the foundation's grants would be well-informed and more effective. Some of the recent publications of this effect include Equity and Excellence in American Higher Education, Reclaiming the Game: College Sports and Educational Values, JSTOR: A History, The Game of Life: College Sports and Educational Values, and The Shape of the River.

Mellon's endowment fluctuates in the range of $5 to $6 billion, and its annual grant-making amounts to about $300 million.

According to Alexander, Mellon supports the “work, experiences, and visions of disabled artists." In July 2024, the Ford and Mellon Foundations named 20 "Disability Futures Fellows," including a Broadway composer, a Marvel video game voice actress, and a three-time Pushcart Prize-nominated poet.

=== Presidents ===
1. Charles S. Hamilton, Jr. (1969–1971)
2. Nathan Pusey (1971–1975), former president of Harvard University
3. John Edward Sawyer (1975–1987), former president of Williams College
4. William G. Bowen (1988–2006), fromer president of Princeton University
5. Don Randel (2006–2013), former president of the University of Chicago
6. Earl Lewis (2013–2018), former provost of Emory University
7. Elizabeth Alexander (2018–present), former professor at Yale University

== Projects and initiatives ==
- The Monuments Project
- The Maniobra Initiative (The work of one's hands initiative)
- Creatives Rebuild New York

== See also ==
- A. W. Mellon Lectures in the Fine Arts
- List of Mellon family foundations
- List of wealthiest charitable foundations
