= Sycamore Island (Pennsylvania) =

River island in Pennsylvania, United States

Coordinates: 40°29′30″N 79°51′23″W

Sycamore Island is an alluvial island in the Allegheny River parallel to Ninemile Island in the borough of Blawnox, Allegheny County in the U.S. state of Pennsylvania.

Sycamore Island is the last remaining privately owned undeveloped island in Allegheny County. The island hosts a unique floodplain hardwood forest – among the most rare plant community types globally. The Allegheny County Natural Heritage Inventory included Sycamore Island as part of the “Allegheny River Biological Diversity Area” which has a ranking of High Significance.

On December 28, 2007, Allegheny Land Trust acquired the 14-acre (57,000 m^{2}) Sycamore Island with the Colcom Foundation providing full funding through a grant for its conservation.
