= National Museums Northern Ireland =

Museum service in Northern Ireland

National Museums NI (formerly National Museums and Galleries of Northern Ireland) is a museum service in Northern Ireland, consisting of the Ulster American Folk Park, the Ulster Folk Museum, Ulster Transport Museum and the Ulster Museum. It is headquartered at Cultra and is sponsored by the Department for Communities to promote history, art, science and the culture of the people of Northern Ireland. As of 2020, NMNI has 274 employees.

== RMS Titanic ==
In late August 2018, several groups were vying for the right to purchase the 5,500 RMS Titanic relics that were an asset of the bankrupt Premier Exhibitions. Eventually, the National Maritime Museum, Titanic Belfast and Titanic Foundation Limited, as well as the National Museums Northern Ireland, joined together as a consortium that was raising money to purchase the 5,500 artefacts. The group intended to keep all of the items together as a single exhibit. Oceanographer Robert Ballard said he favoured this bid since it would ensure that the memorabilia would be permanently displayed in Belfast (where the Titanic was built) and in Greenwich. The museums were critical of the bid process set by the Bankruptcy court in Jacksonville, Florida. The minimum bid for the 11 October 2018 auction was set at US$21.5 million (£16.5m) and the consortium did not have enough funding to meet that amount.
