= Paul Mellon =

American philanthropist and horse breeder

- Mellon standing next to two horses
- Born: June 11, 1907; Pittsburgh, Pennsylvania, U.S.
- Died: February 2, 1999 (aged 91); Upperville, Virginia, U.S.
- Education: Yale University (BA); Clare College, Cambridge (BA, MA)
- Occupations: Businessman; Corporate investor Racehorse owner/breeder Philanthropist
- Spouses: Mary Conover Brown (m. 1935; died 1946) Rachel Lambert Lloyd (m. 1948)
- Children: Catherine, Timothy
- Parent(s): Andrew W. Mellon; Nora McMullen
- Honors: Order of the British Empire (K.B.E.) (1974); National Medal of Arts (1985); National Humanities Medal (1997); Thoroughbred horse racing honors: Exemplar of Racing Virginia Thoroughbred Association Hall of Fame (1988) Eclipse Award for Outstanding Breeder (1971, 1986) Keeneland Mark of Distinction (1996) Virginia Sports Hall of Fame (1999) English Jockey Club Hall of Fame
- Military career
- Allegiance: United States
- Branch: United States Army
- Rank: Major
- Awards: Bronze Star Medal

Paul Mellon (June 11, 1907 – February 2, 1999) was an American philanthropist and a breeder of thoroughbred racehorses. He is one of only five people ever designated an "Exemplar of Racing" by the National Museum of Racing and Hall of Fame. He was co-heir to one of America's greatest business fortunes, derived from the Mellon Bank created by his grandfather Thomas Mellon, his father Andrew W. Mellon, and his uncle Richard B. Mellon. In 1957, when Fortune prepared its first list of the wealthiest Americans, it estimated that Paul Mellon, his sister Ailsa Mellon Bruce, and his cousins Sarah Mellon and Richard King Mellon, were all among the richest eight people in the United States, with fortunes between $400 million and $500 million each (between about $3.5 billion and $4.38 billion in today's dollars).

Mellon and Mary Conover Brown were married from 1935 until her death in 1946. They had two children, Catherine Conover Mellon (first wife of John Warner) and Timothy Mellon. In 1948, Paul Mellon married his second wife, Rachel Lambert ("Bunny") Mellon (August 9, 1910 – March 17, 2014), adopting her two children from a previous marriage.

Mellon's autobiography, Reflections in a Silver Spoon, was published in 1992.

== Early life and education ==
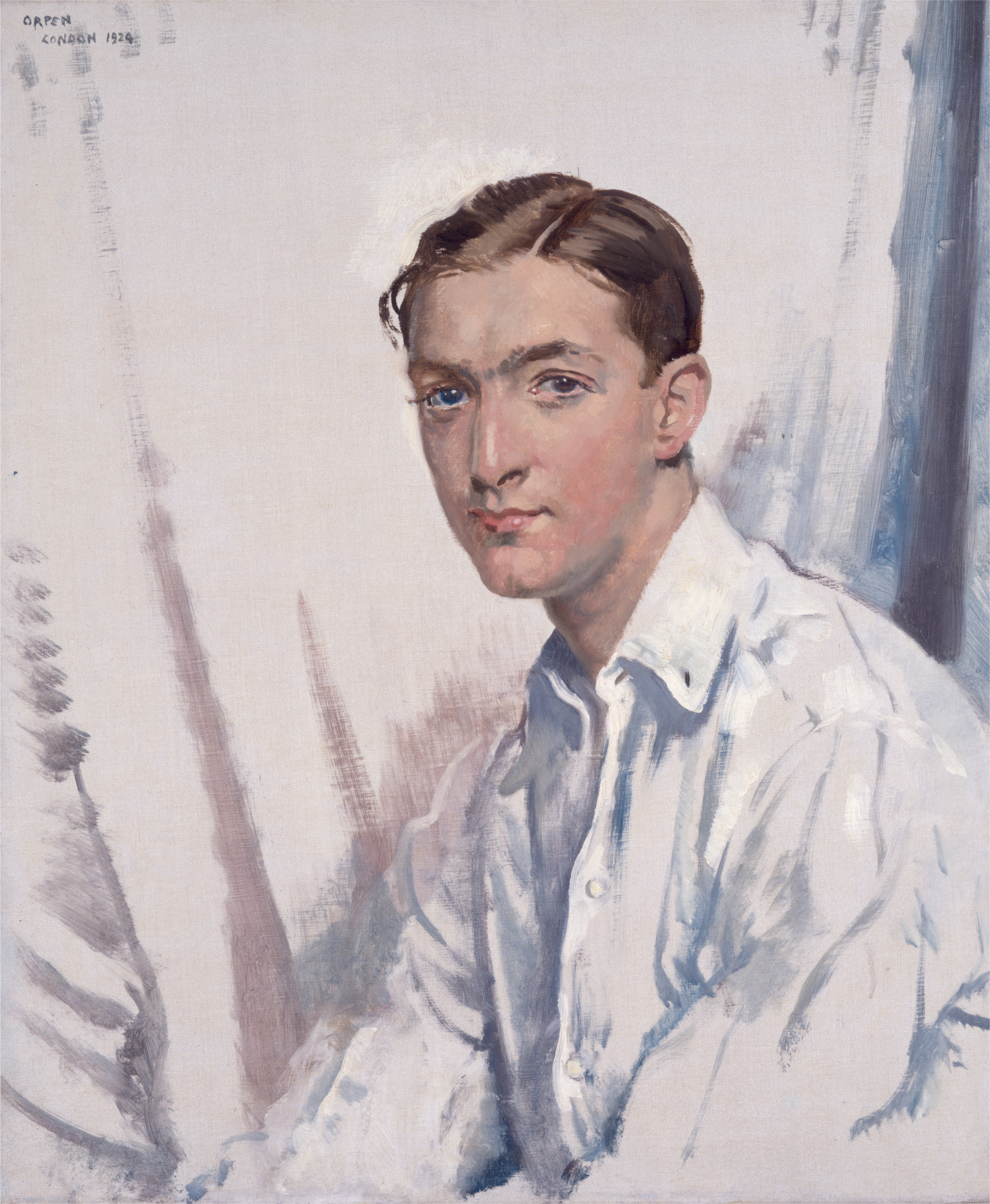
A 1924 portrait of Mellon by William Orpen

Mellon was born in Pittsburgh, Pennsylvania, on June 11, 1907, the son of Andrew W. Mellon, who would serve as U.S. Secretary of the Treasury from 1921 to 1932, and Nora McMullen of Hertford Castle, England. He had one sister, Ailsa Mellon Bruce. When he was 5 years old, his parents divorced. He graduated from The Choate School, now Choate Rosemary Hall, in Wallingford, Connecticut, in 1925, where he wrote for the literary magazine. He went on to Yale College, where he was a member of the Chi Psi fraternity and Scroll and Key and served as vice-chairman of the Yale Daily News. He would become a great benefactor of his alma maters, donating to the Forbes-Mellon Library at the University of Cambridge, the Mellon Arts Center, and the Mellon (now Icahn) Science Center to Choate; two residential colleges at Yale (Ezra Stiles and Morse); and the Yale Center for British Art.

After graduating from Yale in 1929, he went to England to study at Clare College, Cambridge. In 1930, he and Sir Timothy William Gowers helped found the CRABS, the Clare Rugby And Boating Society, the oldest of the collegiate Gentlemen's societies still active. He received a BA in 1931; his father would serve as U.S. Ambassador to the Court of St. James's from 1932 to 1933. In 1938, he received an Oxbridge MA from the University of Cambridge. He would become a major benefactor to Clare College's Forbes-Mellon Library, opened in 1986.

He developed his great love of England and English culture while studying at Clare. "It was while I was at Cambridge that I embarked on the dangerous seas of collecting", he once said, a passion that would have profound implications for his major beneficiaries, both in the US and the UK.

== Career ==
Mellon returned to Pittsburgh, where he worked for Mellon Bank and other businesses for six months.

He enrolled at St. John's College in Annapolis, Maryland, in 1940 but six months later joined the United States Army, asking to join the cavalry. Mellon served with the Morale Operations Branch of the Office of Strategic Services in Europe. He rose to the rank of major and received four battle stars in the European Theatre of Operations.

=== Art collection ===
As an avid art collector, Mellon donated innumerable works that were exhibited at the National Gallery of Art, Virginia Museum of Fine Arts, Yale Center for British Art and the National Museum of Racing and Hall of Fame. Mellon did not share his father's interest in business, but the two found common ground in their love of art and philanthropy. Shortly before Andrew Mellon's death in 1937, construction began on the West Building of the National Gallery of Art in Washington, D.C., for which Andrew Mellon had provided funds. Four years later, Paul Mellon presented the building by John Russell Pope and his father's collection of 115 paintings to the nation. He served on the museum's board for more than four decades: as trustee, as president (twice), as board chair, and as honorary trustee. Mellon commissioned I. M. Pei to build the East Building and, with his sister Ailsa, provided funds for its construction in the late 1970s. Over the years, he and his wife Bunny donated more than 1,000 works to the National Gallery of Art, including many French and American masterworks.

In 1936, Mellon purchased his first British painting, Pumpkin with a Stable-lad by George Stubbs, who became a lifetime favorite of his. From the late 1950s to the mid-1960s, with the help of English art historian Basil Taylor, Mellon amassed a major collection of British art. London art dealer Geoffrey Agnew once said of his acquisitions: "It took an American collector to make the English look again at their own paintings." Mellon's collection was catalogued by Dudley Snelgrove and Judy Egerton.

Mellon granted his extensive collection of British art, rare books, and related materials to Yale in the 1960s, along with the funding to create a museum to house it (designed by Louis Kahn). He insisted that it not be named in honor of him, but rather would be called the Yale Center for British Art, to encourage others to support it as well. Mellon also funded an endowment to support operations and acquisitions, and would add yet more in his will. In 1970, he funded the creation of the Paul Mellon Centre for Studies in British Art, a London-based affiliate of the Yale center, to encourage the study of British art and culture by undergraduate and research scholars alike.

Mellon also provided leadership gifts to the Virginia Museum of Fine Arts in Richmond, Virginia, as well as Choate Rosemary Hall.

=== Rokeby Stables ===
Mellon owned many thoroughbred horses under his Rokeby Stables, including Kentucky Derby winner Sea Hero. Two of his horses, Arts and Letters and Fort Marcy, were named American Horse of the Year in 1969 and 1970 respectively. Both are inductees in the National Museum of Racing and Hall of Fame. He also owned three European champions, Mill Reef, Forrest Flower, and Gold and Ivory. Mill Reef was the #8 rated horse in the world for the 20th Century in A Century of Champions, by John Randall and Tony Morris. Mellon won the Eclipse Award for Outstanding Breeder in 1971 and again in 1986.

=== Establishment of philanthropic foundations ===
Mellon established the Old Dominion Foundation in 1941 and the Bollingen Foundation in 1945 to support advancement and learning of the humanities and liberal education. The Bollingen Foundation published more than 100 books before it closed in 1969, when the assets of the Old Dominion Foundation were merged into those of his sister Ailsa's Avalon Foundation. The combined organization was renamed The Andrew W. Mellon Foundation in honor of their father.

==== Yale University ====
Paul Mellon's foremost philanthropic interest was his alma mater, Yale University, where his gifts extended far beyond the Yale Center for British Art.

His second major gift was funding for two new undergraduate residential colleges: Ezra Stiles College and Morse College. Designed by Eero Saarinen, these colleges, along with the Kahn-designed British Art Center, demonstrated Mellon's effort to bring modern architecture to Yale. The additional undergraduate housing helped Yale add women to its student body in 1969.

Mellon endowed the masterships and deanships of each of Yale's 12 residential colleges. He created the Mellon Senior Forum program, which provides a weekly meal for seniors in each of the residential colleges where they can share progress on their senior essays and projects with one another.

Mellon provided the funding to create the Directed Studies program of intense freshman-year focus on the humanities. He supported the undergraduate theater studies program, and endowed named professorships in schools throughout the university, particularly in the humanities.

==== Other philanthropy ====
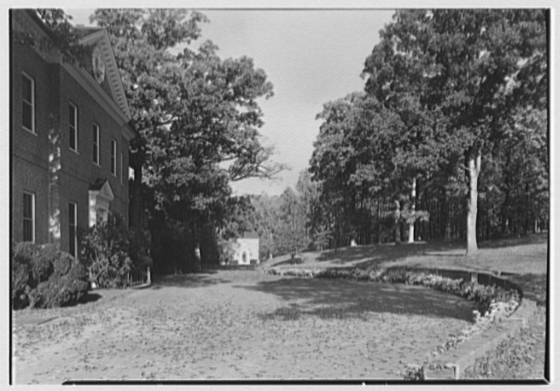
Mellon's residence in Upperville, Virginia (1946)

Paul and Bunny Mellon built a new sanctuary for Trinity Episcopal Church in Upperville, Virginia (1951–1960). The building was inspired by French churches of the twelfth and thirteenth centuries.

Mellon gave money to causes that advanced the preservation of horses, including the United States Jockey Club's Grayson-Jockey Club Research Foundation. This organization gives grants to research projects intended to increase the safety, welfare, longevity and improvement of life for racehorses.

He donated the $1 million bonus that Sea Hero won in the Chrysler Triple Crown Challenge to the Grayson-Jockey Club Research Foundation. Furthermore, he requested that double that amount be raised in response to his donation. That goal was met during the 1995–1996 fiscal year. Upon his death, he left yet another $2.5 million to the Foundation's endowment.

In 1999, Paul Mellon bequeathed $8 million to the University of Cambridge in England for the Fitzwilliam Museum. He agreed that £1 million of that sum could be allocated to the museum's courtyard development and in his will gave $12.5 million to re-light the museum's galleries and renovate the courtyard. The money was added to the Paul Mellon Fund, a trust fund whose income is used for education, exhibitions and publications.

He also helped to buy the 28,625 acres (115.8 km^{2}) Cape Hatteras National Seashore and the 1,500 acres (610 ha) Sky Meadows State Park in the Blue Ridge Mountains of Virginia, where he used to go to look at the stars.

He was also a major benefactor of Clare College and Clare Hall, both in Cambridge, England. Indeed, Clare Hall, founded 1966, gains much from his benefaction; his generous bequest serves the intellectual needs of the graduate college members. The Mellon Fellowship is another example of his generosity, permitting the reciprocal exchange of two students from Yale and two from Clare College for graduate study in each other's institutions.

Mellon helped to arrange the merger of the Mellon Institute of Industrial Research, founded by his father Andrew W. Mellon and uncle Richard B. Mellon, with Andrew Carnegie's Carnegie Institute of Technology in 1967 to create Carnegie Mellon University in Pittsburgh. He subsequently donated money to the school.

== Honors and awards ==
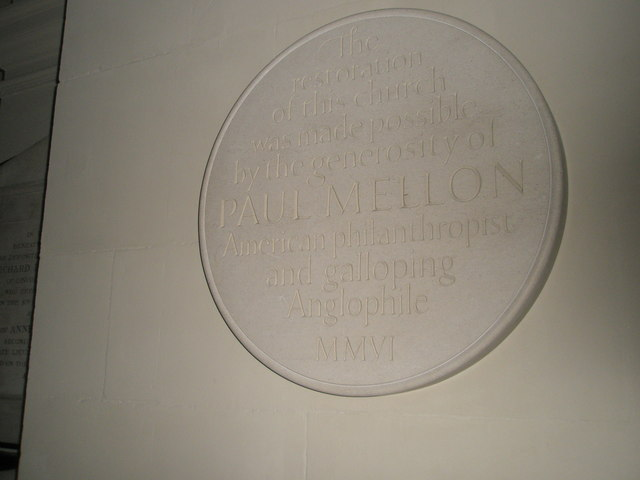
Plaque to Mellon, "American philanthropist and galloping anglophile", in St George's, Bloomsbury, London, a church whose restoration he enabled

Mellon was a trustee of the National Museum of Racing and Hall of Fame and one of the only five people ever designated an "Exemplar of Racing" by the Hall of Fame. He was also inducted into the Virginia Sports Hall of Fame and the English Jockey Club Hall of Fame.

Among honors, he was elected to the American Philosophical Society in 1971, created an Honorary Knight Commander of the Most Excellent Order of the British Empire (KBE) in 1974, awarded the National Medal of Arts in 1985, elected a member of the American Academy of Arts and Sciences in 1992, and awarded the National Humanities Medal in 1997.

In 1978, Mellon received the S. Roger Horchow Award for Greatest Public Service by a Private Citizen, an award given out annually by Jefferson Awards.

== Personal life ==
In 1935, he married Mary Conover Brown and the couple, who had two children, Catherine and Timothy, moved to Virginia.

After his wife Mary's death in 1946 from an asthma attack, he married Rachel Lambert Lloyd, known as "Bunny", the former wife of Stacy Barcroft Lloyd Jr. She was a descendant of the Lambert family who formulated and marketed Listerine and an heiress to the Warner-Lambert corporate fortune (Warner-Lambert is now part of Pfizer, following a 2000 merger). Bunny Mellon was an avid horticulturist and gardener, whose fondness for French Impressionist and Post-Impressionist painting, as well as American art, Mellon came to share. By this marriage, he had two stepchildren: Stacy Lloyd III and Eliza Lambert Lloyd (d. 2008; who married and divorced Viscount Moore).

Paul Mellon died on February 2, 1999, in Upperville, Virginia.

== Quotes ==
- "I have been an amateur in every phase of my life; an amateur poet, an amateur scholar, an amateur horseman, an amateur farmer, an amateur soldier, an amateur connoisseur of art, an amateur publisher, and an amateur museum executive. The root of the word "amateur" is the Latin word for love, and I can honestly say that I've thoroughly enjoyed all the roles I have played." —Paul Mellon from his autobiography Reflections in a Silver Spoon.
