= John W. Kieckhefer =

American businessman (1887–1970)

- Born: December 3, 1886; Milwaukee, Wisconsin, U.S.
- Died: February 22, 1970 (aged 83); Arizona, U.S.
- Political party: Republican
- Spouse: Dorothy H. Hazelwood
- Children: 2
- Parents: William H. Kieckhefer (father); Louise (Schroeder) Kieckhefer (mother)

John W. Kieckhefer (December 3, 1886 – February 2, 1970) was an American businessman.

== Early life ==
John W. Kieckhefer was born on December 3, 1886, in Milwaukee, Wisconsin, to Louise and William H. Kieckhefer. On January 20, 1917, he married Dorothy H. Hazelwood. The couple went on to have two children, Robert (born 1917) and Ida.

== Career ==
He took over Enterprise Box & Lumber Company, which was a family-run business started by his grandfather, Charles (Carl) Kieckefer, and later run by his father, William H. Kieckhefer. When he became the company's president, he changed the name to Kieckhefer Container Company. The company pioneered the use of fiber shipping containers, including the paper milk carton. Kieckhefer purchased majority control of the Eddy Paper Company of Chicago, Illinois, in 1927. The main offices of Kieckhefer-Eddy were on the 24th floor of the Palmolive Building in Chicago. In 1957, through an exchange of stock, the Kieckhefer holdings were merged with the Weyerhaeuser Timber Company of Tacoma, Washington. The Kieckhefer Container Co. was moved to Camden, New Jersey, in about 1950. The Milwaukee, Wisconsin, operations of the Eddy Paper Co. were closed in 1952.

Kieckhefer was one of the wealthiest men in America in 1957 and was worth $75,000,000 to $100,000,000. Kieckhefer later moved from Wisconsin to Prescott, Arizona, where he became active in Republican Party politics, serving as GOP state finance chairman and as a delegate to several Republican national conventions.

Kieckhefer died on February 22, 1970, in Arizona.
