= Richard King Mellon =

American financier, general and philanthropist

R.K. Mellon
- Born: Richard King Mellon; June 19, 1899; Ligonier, Pennsylvania, U.S.
- Died: June 3, 1970 (aged 70); West Penn Hospital, Pittsburgh, Pennsylvania, U.S.
- Resting place: Huntland Downs, Ligonier, Pennsylvania
- Education: Princeton University
- Occupation: Financier · Philanthropist
- Known for: Aluminum Company of America· RK Mellon Foundation
- Spouse: Constance Prosser (m. 1936)
- Children: Richard P. Mellon; Seward Prosser Mellon; Constance Barber Mellon; Cassandra Mellon Milbury
- Relatives: Seward Prosser (father-in-law); Richard B. Mellon (father); Andrew W. Mellon (uncle); Sarah Mellon Scaife (sister); See Mellon family
- Military career
- Allegiance: United States
- Branch: United States Army
- Rank: Lieutenant general
- Conflicts: World War I World War II
- Awards: Distinguished Service Medal

Richard King Mellon (June 19, 1899 – June 3, 1970), commonly known as R.K., was an American financier, general, and philanthropist from Ligonier, Pennsylvania, and part of the Mellon family.

== Biography ==
The son of Richard B. Mellon, nephew of Andrew W. Mellon, and grandson of Thomas Mellon, he and his sister Sarah Mellon Scaife and cousins Paul Mellon and Ailsa Mellon-Bruce, were heirs to the Mellon fortune, which included major holdings in Mellon Bank, Gulf Oil, and Alcoa. In 1957, when Fortune prepared its first list of the wealthiest Americans, it estimated that the four cousins were all amongst the richest eight people in the United States, with fortunes of between $400 million and $700 million each. R.K. Mellon served as president and chairman of Mellon Bank. He also served on the board of trustees of the University of Pittsburgh over a span of several decades and was a major benefactor to the university.

=== Military service ===
Mellon served in the United States Army in both world wars and remained active in the United States Army Reserve, receiving the Distinguished Service Medal and rising to the rank of lieutenant general.

=== Urban Renewal ===
He is chiefly remembered for his urban renewal efforts in Pittsburgh, undertaken in an unlikely bipartisan (Mellon was a lifelong Republican) partnership with the city's postwar Democratic mayor David L. Lawrence. After returning to the city following World War II, Mellon developed an interest in improving Pittsburgh's severe flooding, pollution, and urban blight. Under the auspices of the Urban Redevelopment Authority of Pittsburgh (URA), massive demolition and redevelopment projects transformed the city, backed politically by Lawrence and financially by Mellon and his companies. Mellon also used his economic power to push companies and landowners to comply with new regulations. In 1955 a redevelopment plan and federal funding were approved to coincide with the construction of a new Civic Arena (1961–2010). The URA, with the support of R. K. Mellon, displaced 8,000 residents, businesses and churches. And while the Civic Arena and later Consol Energy Arena/PPG Paints Arena were constructed in the area, dozens of acres of land still remain vacant. Mellon served as Vice President of American Council to Improve Our Neighborhoods, an organization to promote for-profit private urban renewal projects.

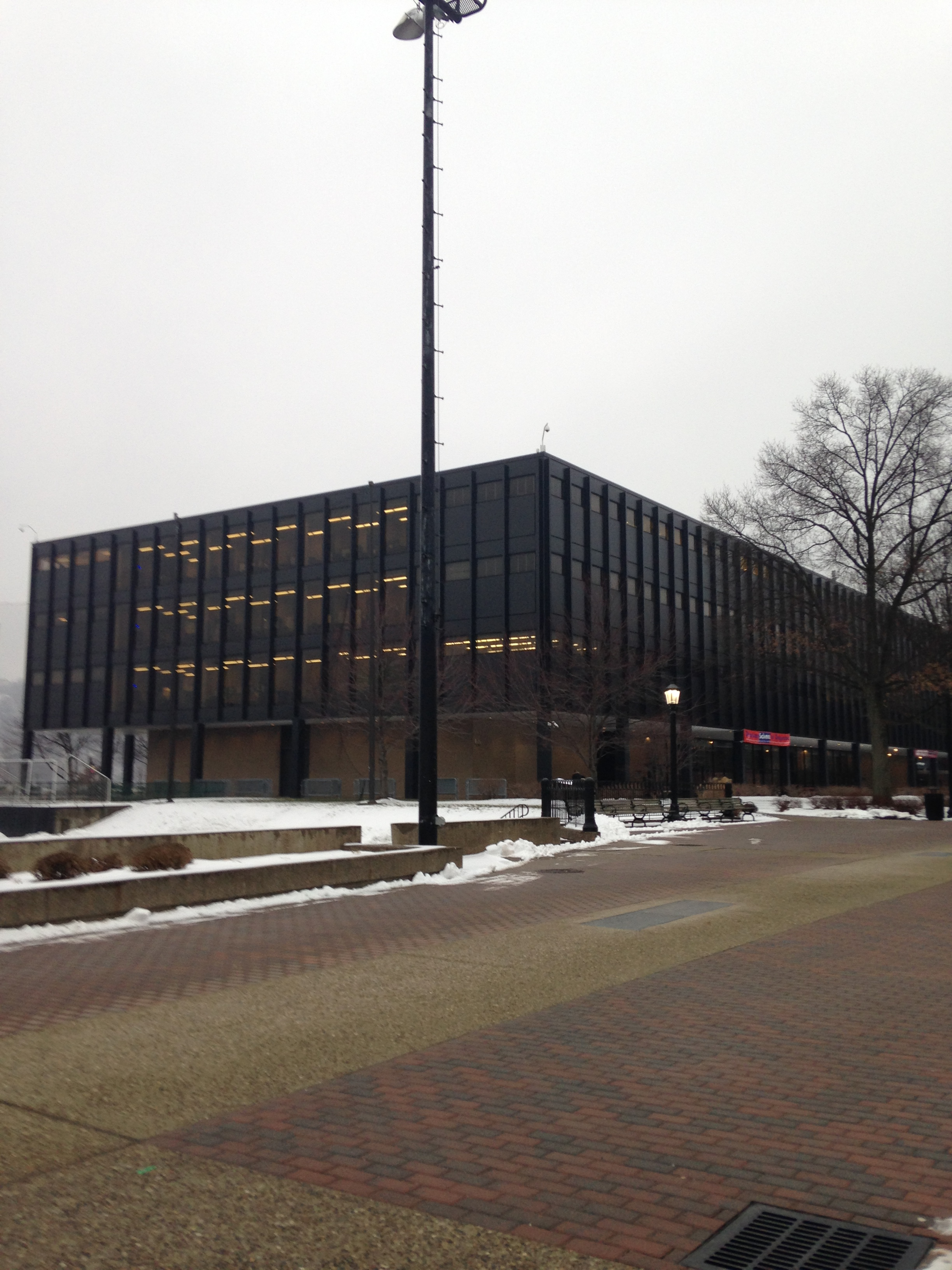
Richard King Mellon Hall of Science at Duquesne University, Pennsylvania

== Family ==
He married Constance (nee Prosser) McCaulley, daughter of New York City banker Seward Prosser, in 1936. Constance was the widow of Vance McCaulley, whom she married in 1929 and who died in 1935. They adopted four children: Richard P. Mellon, Seward Prosser Mellon, Constance Barber Mellon, and Cassandra Mellon Milbury. Richard King Mellon was also the primary financial founder of Carnegie Mellon University's Heinz College, then known as the School of Urban and Public Affairs.

== Foundation ==
The Richard King Mellon Foundation manages his charitable estate and has participated in redeveloping industrial brownfields in Pittsburgh.

=== Maurepas Swamp WMA ===
In 2001 the foundation donated two tracts of land, totaling 61,633 acres, to the Louisiana Department of Wildlife and Fisheries (LDWF) for the Maurepas Swamp WMA. Between 2001 and 2011 another 12,000 acres were gained through purchases and donations. In 2012 another 29,630 acres (The MC Davis Tract) was acquired from The Conservation Fund. Subsequent acquisitions of the Rathborne, Boyce, and Crusel tracts now gives the WMA 122,098 acres that all began with the Mellon Foundation donation.

== See also ==
- History of Pittsburgh
