= Timothy G. Townsend =

American environmental engineer

Timothy G. Townsend Ph.D.
- Education: B.S. (Dec 1989), M.E. (Aug 1992), Ph.D. (May 1995), all in Environmental Engineering Sciences, University of Florida
- Known for: Landfill design and bioreactor technology, construction and demolition (C&D) recycling, waste-to-energy ash, PFAS fate in waste streams
- Scientific career
- Fields: Environmental engineering, solid and hazardous waste management
- Institutions: University of Florida

Timothy G. Townsend is an American environmental engineer and professor in the University of Florida's Department of Environmental Engineering Sciences. His research focuses on solid waste and sustainable materials management, recycling, landfills, and hazardous waste.

== Education and career ==
Townsend earned his B.S. (December 1989), M.E. (August 1992), and Ph.D. (May 1995) in Environmental Engineering Sciences from the University of Florida. He joined the UF faculty in 1995 and holds the endowed Jones Edmunds Professorship in Environmental Engineering Sciences. He is a licensed Professional Engineer in Florida. In 2022, he was appointed Executive Director of the Florida's Hinkley Center for Solid and Hazardous Waste Management. In 2025, he was awarded the title of Distinguished Professor by UF.

== Research contributions ==
Townsend’s early research focused on exploring approaches for more sustainable design and operation of municipal waste landfills and he has co-authored several books on the topic. He coupled this work with an examination of the environmental impacts of electronic waste, the results of which were relied upon by the US Environmental Protection Agency in federal rulemaking. His work on construction waste and demolition waste, including disaster debris, investigated both environmental challenges of this materials stream along with recycling opportunities. Over the past decade Townsend’s research has concentrated on the beneficial use of large volume waste materials and the challenge of per- and polyfluoroalkyl substances (PFAS).

== Awards and recognition ==
In 2011 he was selected to give the Air and Waste Management Association Critical Review. In 2015 Townsend was inducted into the Construction and Demolition Recycling Association’s Hall of Fame. In 2021 he was presented the Richard I. Stessel Waste Management Award by the Air and Waste Management Association. In 2026 he was appointed to the Scientific Advisory Board of the United States Environmental Protection Agency.
