= Timothy Wesley Townsend =

American commercial photographer (1844–1912)

Timothy Wesley Townsend (April 11, 1844 – July 1, 1912) was an American photographer.

He established one of the earliest photography studios in Iowa and produced the stereoview series "Gems of Clear Lake" and "Views of Iowa City and Vicinity".

== Early life and family ==
Townsend was born in Fredericks Grove, Knox County, Ohio. The son of James Townsend and Susanna (Rogers) Townsend, he married Anna Emaline Coover, daughter of Isaac and Anna Wilhelmina Coover at Muscatine, Iowa on January 4, 1866. They had two children, Alva Coover Townsend and Charles Fremont Townsend, both would follow their father into the photography business. Timothy's brother, Israel Lewis Townsend, and his nephew James Arthur Townsend were also photographers. Israel having a studio at Iowa Falls, Iowa and James having a studio at Hastings, Nebraska. Israel produced the stereoview series Iowa Falls and Vicinity.

== Photography career ==
In 1866, T. W. Townsend moved to Iowa City, Johnson county, Iowa and established a Townsend's Photography Studio above Whetstone's Drug Store. In 1888, T. W. Townsend moved to Lincoln, Nebraska and opened a new Studio there at 226 South Eleventh Street. In 1894, T. W. Townsend was awarded a diploma for meritorious work at the exposition of the National Photographers Association in St Louis. In 1895, T. W. Townsend was elected President of the Nebraska State Photographer's Association. In 1898, T. W. Townsend moved to Pasadena, California and bought the Westerfelt Photography Studio, which was the largest studio in Los Angeles. He left his Lincoln, Nebraska studio to be run by his son, Alva Coover Townsend. In 1899, T. W. Townsend bought the P. D. Wert's Photography Studio in Iowa City, Iowa. He left his Los Angeles, California studio to be run by his son, Charles Fremont Townsend. In 1903, Mr. Townsend's son, Alva, was elected president of the Nebraska State Photographer's Association. In 1904, Charles Fremont Townsend sold the Los Angeles, California studio and moved to Des Moines, Iowa where he opened a photography studio at 613 Walnut Street. By 1905, Charles Fremont Townsend was the president of the Photography Association of Iowa. In 1910, Charles Fremont Townsend was elected second vice-president of the National Photography Association. By 1911, he was the vice president. In 1913, Charles Fremont Townsend was elected President of the Photographers Association of America. In 1917, Alva Coover Townsend was elected President of the Missouri Valley Photographer's Association. In 1927, Alva Coover Townsend was elected President of the National Photographers Association. He was re-elected in 1928.

Timothy Wesley Townsend died on July 1, 1912.
