= Richard B. Mellon =

American banker (1858–1933)

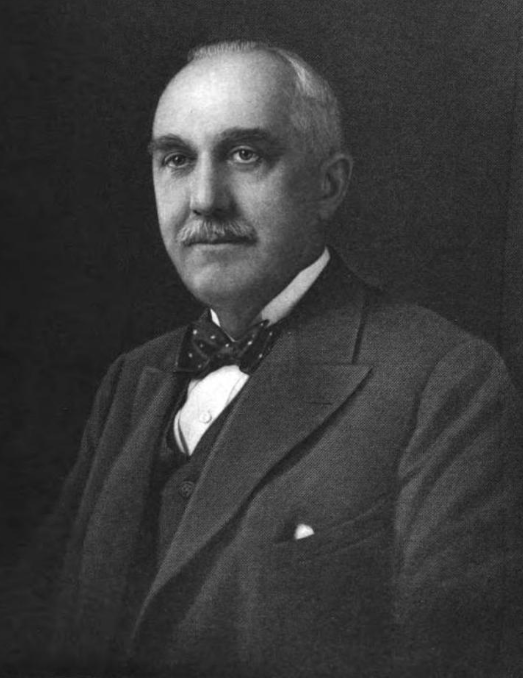
- Born: March 19, 1858; Pittsburgh, Pennsylvania, U.S.
- Died: December 1, 1933 (aged 75); Pittsburgh, Pennsylvania, U.S.
- Education: University of Pittsburgh
- Children: Sarah Mellon; Richard King Mellon

Richard Beatty Mellon (March 19, 1858 – December 1, 1933), sometimes R.B., was an American banker, industrialist, and philanthropist from Pittsburgh, Pennsylvania. He was the son of Mellon family patriarch Thomas Mellon.

== Biography ==
He and his brother Andrew Mellon, sons of Judge Thomas Mellon, were frequent business partners. Richard served under Andrew at Mellon Bank and assumed its presidency in 1921 when Andrew was appointed Secretary of the Treasury.

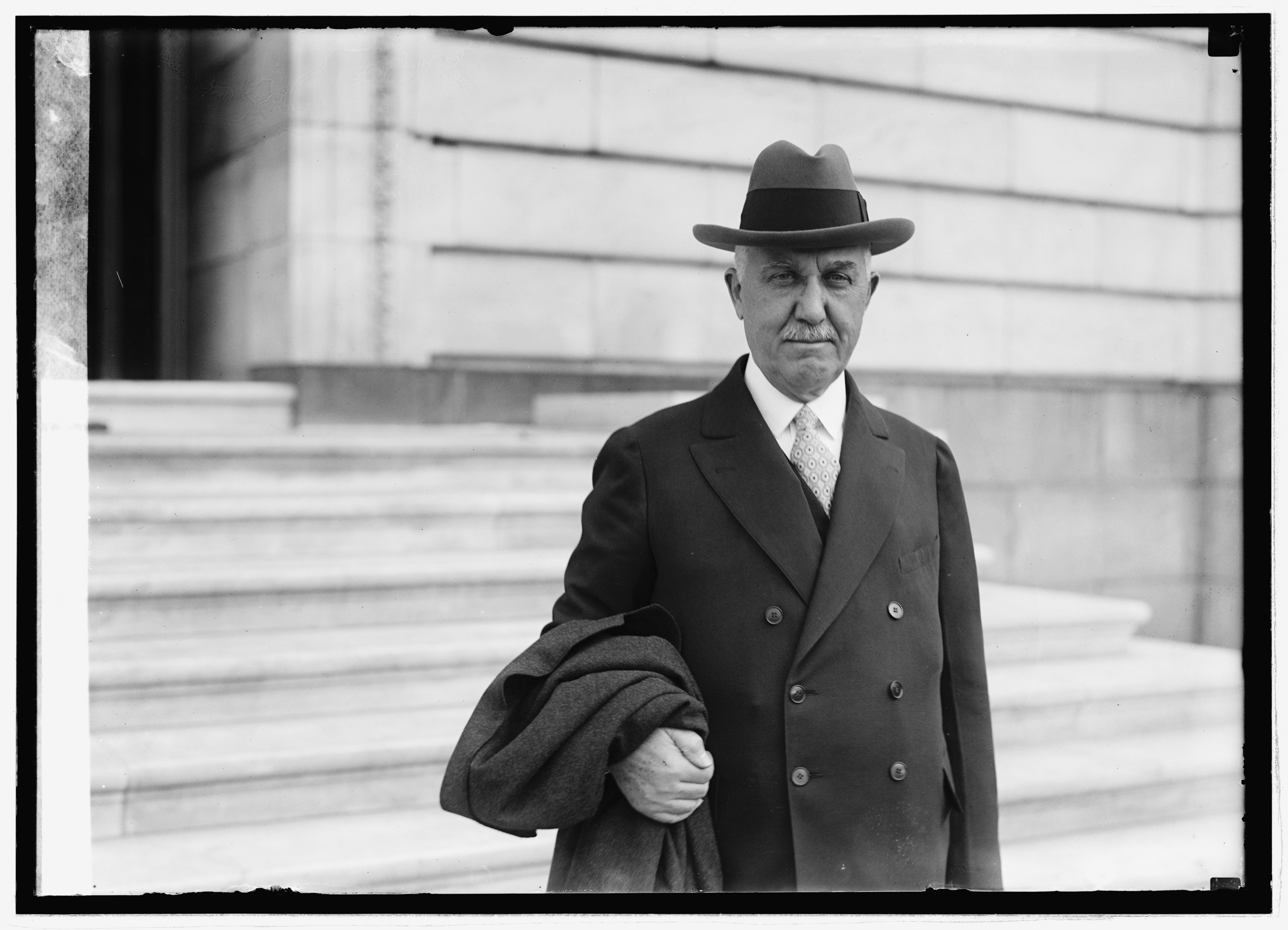
Mellon in 1924

R.B. served from 1899 to 1910 as president of the Pittsburgh Reduction Company, renamed the Aluminum Company of America (Alcoa) in 1907, and was heavily invested in the Pittsburgh Coal Company, today part of CONSOL Energy, where he clashed with John L. Lewis and the United Mine Workers. Later, he was instrumental in forming Mellbank Corporation, a bank holding company, which helped the affiliated banks weather the Great Depression.

In 1918, R.B. Mellon organized the Citizens' Committee on City Plan, which sought to improve Pittsburgh through better urban planning and zoning. In honor of his civic efforts, the Air and Waste Management Association recognizes individuals who have made administrative, legislative, and judicial contributions to the field of pollution abatement with the Richard Beatty Mellon Award.

In 1931, R.B. Mellon, along with C.C. Macdonald, assumed control of Idlewild Park in Ligonier, Pennsylvania. He was the founder of the Rolling Rock Club.

His children, Sarah Mellon and her younger brother Richard King Mellon, were heirs to the family fortune alongside their cousins Paul Mellon and Ailsa Mellon-Bruce.

=== Philanthropy ===
Mellon's philanthropic gifts were primarily church-oriented. In 1926 he established a $15 million pension fund for Presbyterian ministers. He and his wife, Jennie Taylor King, were the major donors to the Cathedral of Hope, the new home for the East Liberty Presbyterian Church, which they and their parents had attended. He died on December 1, 1933, before the new building was completed. The $13.3 million in taxes paid on his estate enabled the state to meet its payroll.

Richard and his brother, Andrew, also made joint philanthropic gifts, notably several large donations to their alma mater, the University of Pittsburgh, including creation of the Mellon Institute of Industrial Research to honor their father, which is now a part of Carnegie Mellon University.
