= Roy Arthur Hunt =

American industrialist and philanthropist

- Born: August 3, 1881; Nashua, United States
- Died: October 21, 1966 (aged 85); Pittsburgh
- Resting place: Allegheny Cemetery
- Education: Yale University
- Occupation: Business executive
- Known for: Being one of the richest Americans
- Title: President and executive committee chairman of the Aluminum Company of America

Roy Arthur Hunt (August 3, 1881 – October 21, 1966) was an American multi-millionaire and president of the American aluminium company Alcoa. He accumulated a personal net worth of between $100 and $200 million by the end of his life, making him one of the wealthiest Americans ever.

== Early life ==
Roy was born in 1881, to Captain Alfred Epher Hunt (1855–1899) and Maria Tyler McQuesten (18??-1939). His father, Alfred was a graduated from the Massachusetts Institute of Technology and died of Malaria which he contracted during the Spanish-American War.

Roy attended Yale University for three years.

== Career ==
He got a job as a machinist’s helper and later a mill clerk in the New Kensington Alcoa plant in 1903. By 1907, Roy was an assistant superintendent and in 1914 he joined Alcoa’s board of directors and served as General Superintendent of the company’s fabricating plants.

The company saw massive improvement during this time due to America's involvement in World War I and Roy became the company's vice president in 1918, in 1928 he became the company's president.

Roy held the position from 1928 to 1951, when he became chairman of the executive committee, a position he held until 1963.

While being president of Alcoa, he was also a director of Mellon National Bank and Trust Company, the National Union Fire Insurance Company, and Pittsburgh Testing Laboratory. He held honorary degrees from the University of Pittsburgh, Oberlin College, and Grove City College. He was a trustee of Magee Women’s Hospital, the Pittsburgh Skin and Cancer Foundation, Grove City College, Carnegie Institute of Technology, Allegheny Cemetery (where he was buried) and was the founder of the Roy A. Hunter Foundation.

== Death ==
Roy remained a member of the Alcoa Board of Directors until his death on October 21, 1966.
