= Colcom Foundation =

American private foundation

- Formation: 1996
- Founder: Cordelia Scaife May
- Type: Private foundation
- Headquarters: Pittsburgh, PA, United States
- President: John S. Barsotti
- Revenue: $41,077,227 (2024)
- Expenses: $28,200,920 (2024)
- Website: colcomfdn.org

Colcom Foundation is a private foundation established in 1996 by Cordelia Scaife May, a Mellon family heiress. The foundation is a major funding source for anti-immigration organizations located within the United States, while also focusing on population control, environmental conservation, and civic and environmental projects, especially in the Pittsburgh, Pennsylvania area where it is based.

== History ==
The Colcom Foundation was founded in 1996 by Cordelia Scaife May, an heiress to the Mellon family. The foundation has stated that their mission is "to promote sustainable immigration that won’t overwhelm the environment or the economy". May served as the foundation's chairman until her death in 2005, and upon her death, she left close to half of her fortune to the Colcom Foundation, which totaled over $400 million.

In 2009, the foundation provided grant money in support of the G20 summit in Pittsburgh, planting trees around the David L. Lawrence Convention Center.

In 2018, Colcom's sponsorship of Pittsburgh's Holiday Market drew criticism from immigrant rights advocates, causing signage mentioning the Colcom Foundation to be removed from the market.

In 2020, immigrant rights activists launched a campaign to discourage Pittsburgh-area civic and environmental groups from accepting money from the Colcom Foundation. Several organizations subsequently severed their ties to the foundation.

=== Activities ===
The Colcom Foundation has played a significant role in shaping immigration policy in the United States through its extensive funding of organizations such as the Center for Immigration Studies (CIS), the Federation for American Immigration Reform (FAIR), and NumbersUSA, all of which advocate for reduced immigration levels. Since the early 2000s, the Colcom Foundation has provided tens of millions of dollars to these groups. Some organizations funded by the Colcom Foundation have been designated as hate groups by the Southern Poverty Law Center (SPLC), including CIS, FAIR, and Californians for Population Stabilization. According to a 2019 report by the Pittsburgh Post-Gazette, Colcom contributed $33.8 million to immigration-focused organizations between June 30, 2017, and June 30, 2018.

The Colcom Foundation has also supplied grants for environmental projects, including the conservation of Sycamore Island in the Allegheny River, conservation of the French Creek Watershed, funding for water quality studies in the Monongahela River, the creation of a revolving loan fund enabling land trusts to undertake conservancy projects, and the establishment of the Marcellus Environmental Fund to assess and address risks of shale drilling, It has also supported the conservation of land around Mount Washington and the activities of the Western Pennsylvania Conservancy. In addition, the foundation has funded civic projects within Pennsylvania, including the Tribute to Children monument honoring Mister Rogers, the completion of a bridge for bicyclists on the Great Allegheny Passage, matching funds to renovate the fountain at historic Point State Park, and support for converting the Brilliant Line into a dedicated bike and pedestrian trail. Critics have described these environmental and civic projects as greenwashing, intended to distract attention from their funding of immigration restrictions.

== See also ==
- List of Mellon family foundations
