= Sabadell Financial Center =

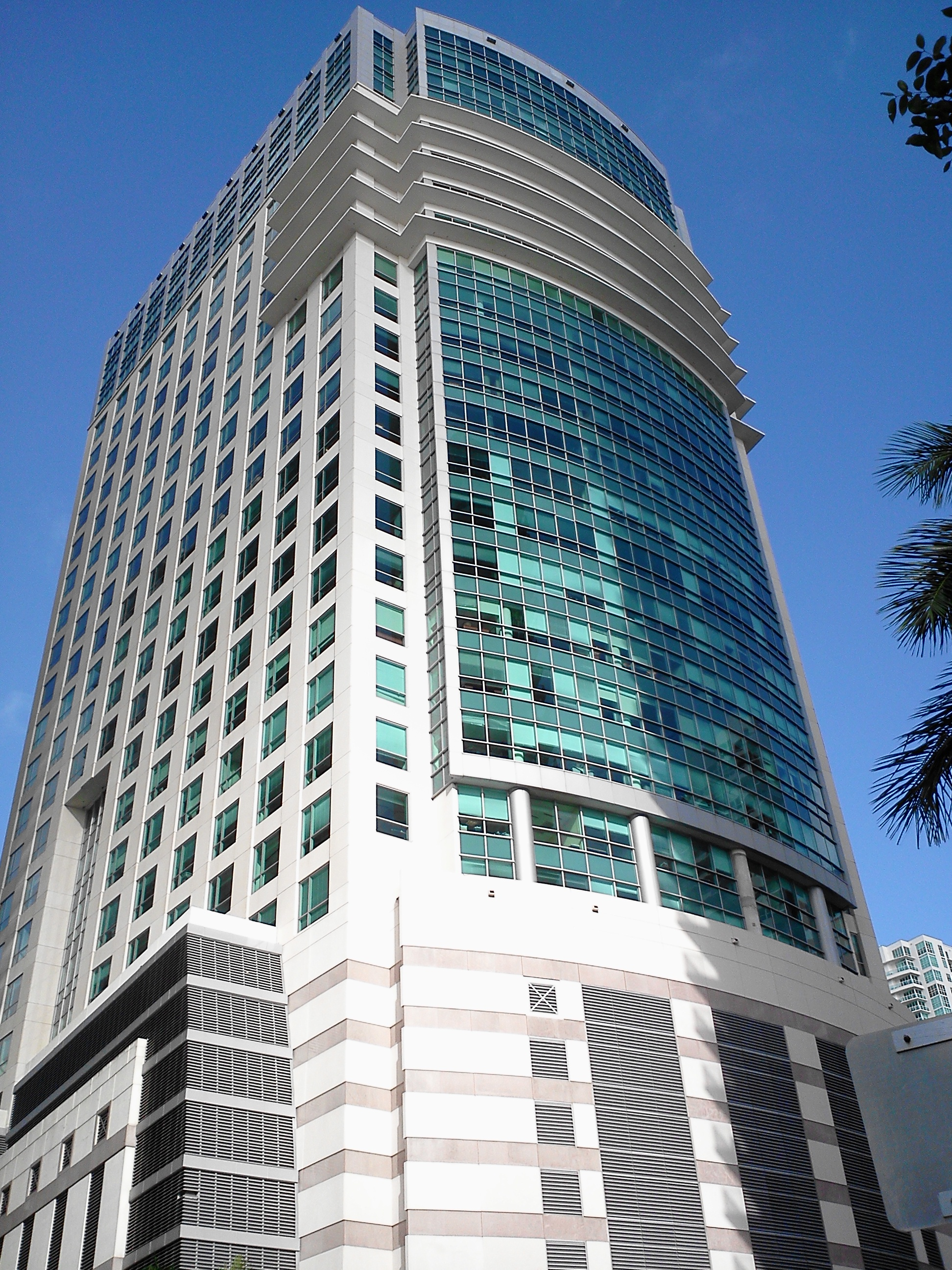
- Interactive map of the Sabadell Financial Center area
- Former names: Mellon Financial Center, Barclays Financial Center

General information
- Type: Office
- Location: 1150 Brickell Bay Drive, Miami, Florida, United States
- Coordinates: 25.762257°N 80.190046°W
- Construction started: 1998
- Completed: 2000
- Opening: 2000

Height
- Roof: 430 ft (130 m)

Technical details
- Floor count: 31

The Sabadell Financial Center is an office building in Downtown Miami, Florida, United States. The tower is 430 feet (130 m) in height and has 31 floors. It is located in the northern Brickell Financial District of Miami, on Brickell Avenue and Southeast 12th Street. Built in 2000, the building is over 95% office space, with the ground floor dedicated to retail.

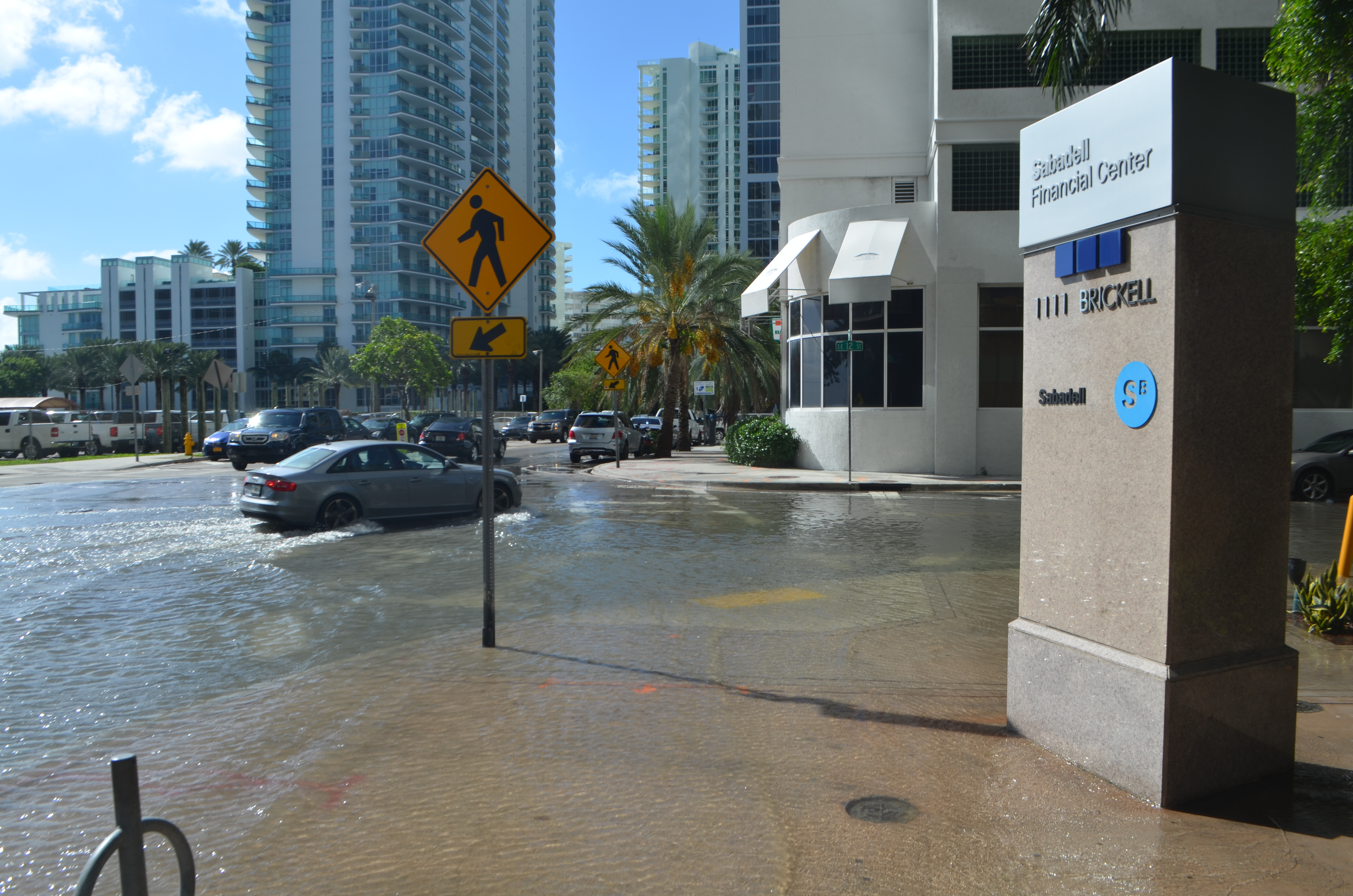
October 17, 2016, tidal flooding on a sunny day during the "King tides".

The intersection at which the building is located is an exceptionally low spot in Brickell that rounds to 0 feet (0 m) above sea level, and is therefore prone to tidal flooding during king tides, storm surges or other exceptionally high tides.

== See also ==
- List of tallest buildings in Miami
