= Ailsa Mellon Bruce =

American art collector (1901–1969)

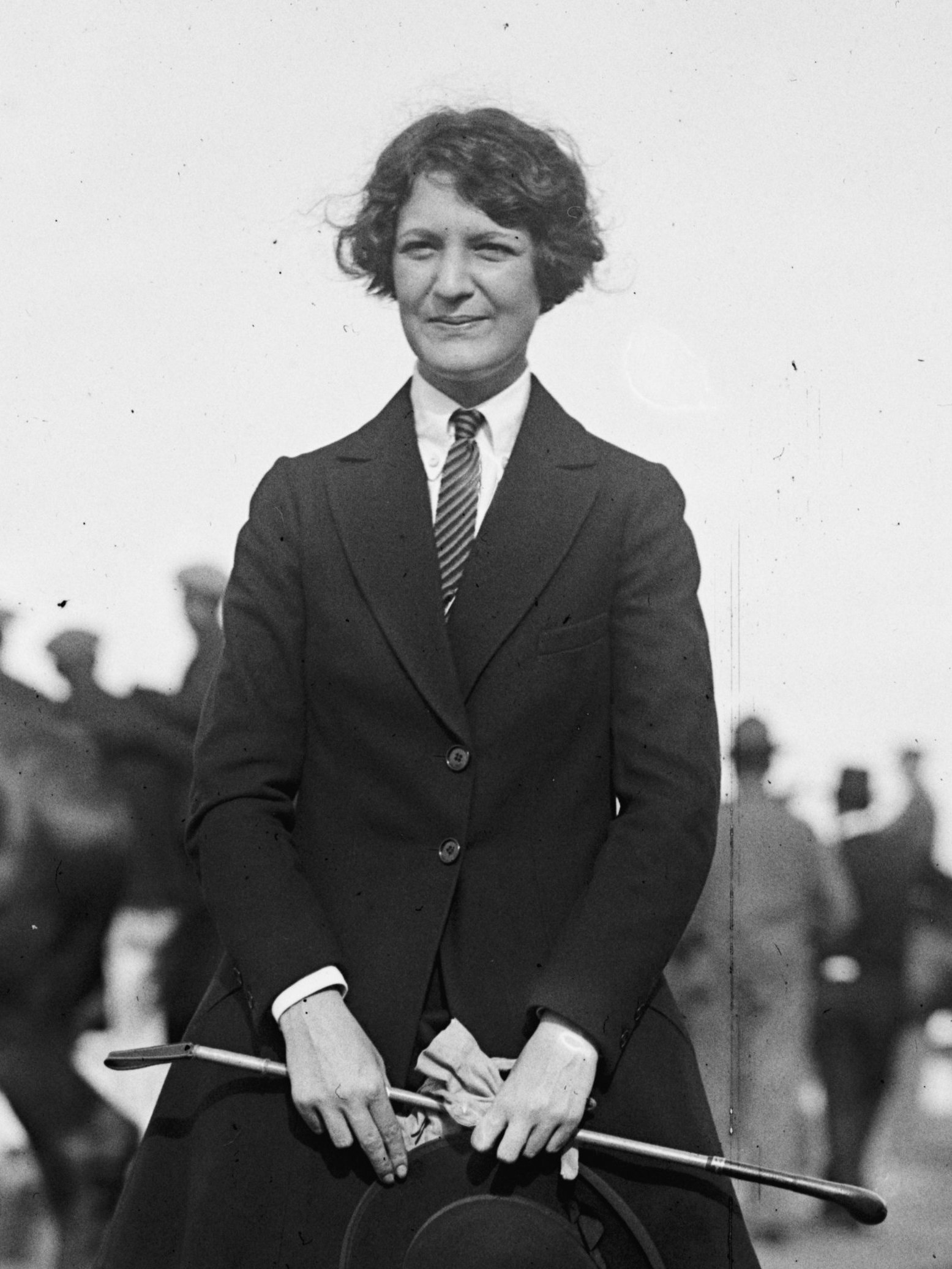
- Ailsa Mellon in 1923
- Born: Ailsa Mellon; 28 June 1901; Pittsburgh, Pennsylvania, U.S.
- Died: 25 August 1969 (aged 68); New York City, U.S.
- Education: Miss Porter's School
- Known for: Founder of the Avalon Foundation
- Spouse: David K. E. Bruce (m. 1926; div. 1945)
- Children: Audrey Sheila Bruce
- Parent(s): Andrew W. Mellon; Nora McMullen

Ailsa Mellon Bruce (June 28, 1901 – August 25, 1969) was a prominent American socialite and philanthropist who established the Avalon Foundation.

== Early life ==
Ailsa was born in Pittsburgh, Pennsylvania, on June 28, 1901. She was the daughter of the banker and diplomat Andrew W. Mellon and Nora Mary (née McMullen) Mellon. Her parents divorced in 1912 and from 1921 to 1932, Ailsa served as her father's official hostess during his tenure as United States Secretary of the Treasury, and again when he was U.S. Ambassador to the United Kingdom in 1932–1933. Her only sibling was brother Paul Mellon, who was also a philanthropist and was known as a prominent owner/breeder of thoroughbred racehorses.

Ailsa attended Miss Porter's School in Farmington, Connecticut and as a teenager spent her summers in Europe.

== Philanthropy and legacy ==
Bruce established the Avalon Foundation in 1940, which made grants to colleges and universities, medical schools and hospitals, youth programs and community services, churches, environmental projects, and an array of cultural and arts organizations. In 1947, the Avalon Foundation was instrumental in the establishment of the Hampton National Historic Site in Maryland.

In 1957, when Fortune prepared its first list of the wealthiest Americans, it estimated that Ailsa Mellon Bruce, her brother, Paul, and their cousins, Sarah Mellon and Richard King Mellon, were among the richest eight people in the United States, with fortunes of between 400 and 700 million dollars each. In 1968, Ailsa and Paul donated $20 million to build an annex to the National Gallery of Art in Washington, D.C.

Ailsa Bruce was a silent partner, with Nona McAdoo Park and Sophie Meldrim Shonnard, founding Chez Ninon in 1928, on Madison Avenue.

At her death in 1969, Ailsa Bruce bequeathed 153 paintings, primarily by 19th-century French artists, to the National Gallery of Art, as well as establishing a fund for future acquisitions. Among the many works acquired by the Gallery through the Ailsa Mellon Bruce Fund was the portrait of Ginevra de' Benci, the only painting by Leonardo da Vinci in the United States. In 1969, the assets of Paul Mellon’s Old Dominion Foundation were merged into his sister's Avalon Foundation, which was renamed the Andrew W. Mellon Foundation in honor of their father.

== Personal life ==
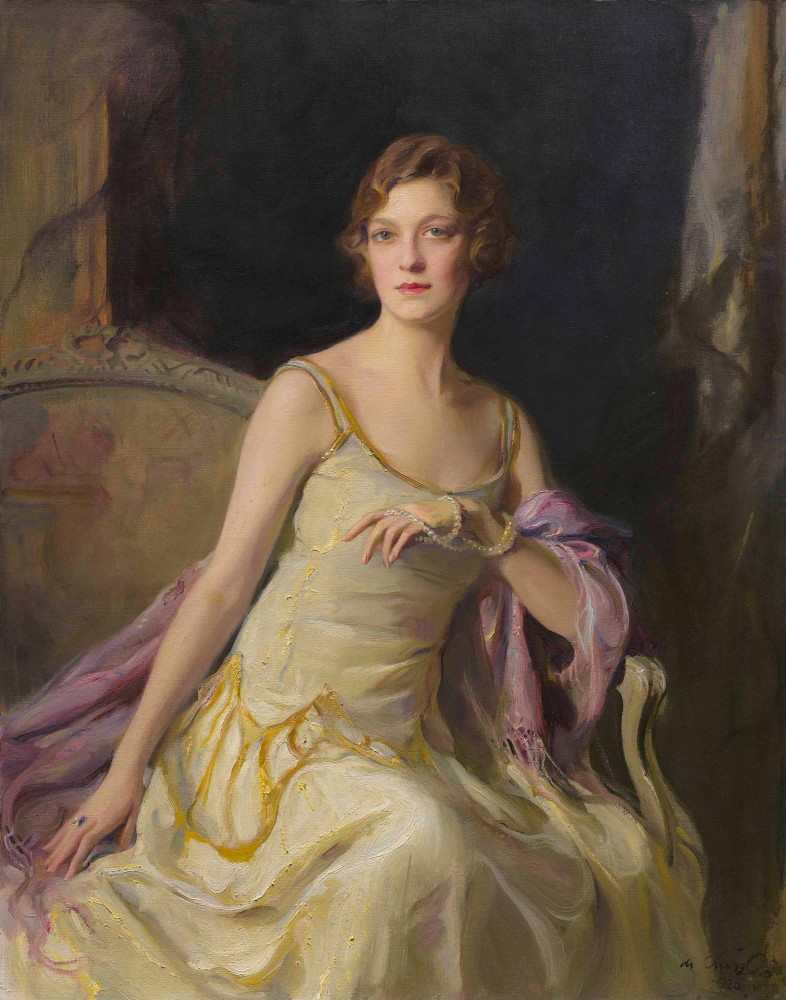
Portrait by Philip de László, 1926

She dated Prince Otto Bismarck, the grandson of Otto von Bismarck, the "Iron Chancellor", and was close to marrying him, but decided to marry David Bruce, an American, instead.

On May 23, 1926, she married David Kirkpatrick Este Bruce (1898–1977), a scion of a prominent Virginia family including his father William Cabell Bruce, a U.S. Senator from Maryland, and brother James Cabell Bruce, the U.S. Ambassador to Argentina. Their engagement, marriage (which was attended by President and Mrs. Coolidge) and honeymoon were followed closely by the news media. In 1933, after seven years of marriage, Ailsa gave birth to her only child:

- Audrey Sheila Bruce (1934–1967), who married Stephen Richard Currier (1930–1967), who went missing during a flight in the Caribbean in January 1967 and were never recovered. They were the founders of the Taconic Foundation, a charitable giving organization, which was instrumental in the formation of the Council for United Civil Rights Leadership.

After residing in Rome and Washington, David and Ailsa by the late 1930s lived increasingly apart. Stationed in London during the Second World War, David met and fell in love with Evangeline Bell. Ailsa obtained a divorce from her husband in Palm Beach, Florida in April 1945 on the grounds of "desertion and mental cruelty", and Ailsa received sole custody of their 11-year-old daughter. Following their divorce, her ex-husband would later become the United States Ambassador to the United Kingdom from 1961 to 1969, the same position her father held.

After her divorce, Mrs. Bruce was in a long rumored relationship with G. Lauder Greenway of the Lauder Greenway Family. In addition to their personal links, Greenway was a longtime trustee of Bruce's Avalon Foundation.

She died on August 25, 1969, at Roosevelt Hospital in New York City. She had homes at 960 Fifth Avenue, a beach house in Atlantic Beach, NY, and a 121-acre estate in Syosset, New York on Long Island. Her obituary in The New York Times called her the "Richest Woman in U.S."

=== Descendants ===
When Audrey and her husband, Stephen Currier, died in a presumed plane crash in 1967, leaving three young children – Andrea Currier, Lavinia Currier, and Michael Stephen Currier (1961–1998), she decided to bequeath her collection of 18th-century English furniture and ceramics to the Carnegie Institute of Pittsburgh, Pennsylvania.

== See also ==
- Wealthiest Americans (1957)
