= Air & Waste Management Association =

Non-profit professional environmental organization

- Abbreviation: A&WMA
- Type: Nonprofit
- Legal status: Professional organization
- Location: Pittsburgh, Pennsylvania, United States of America
- Fields: Environmental protection
- Members: 5,000+ (2021)
- Publication: Journal of the Air & Waste Management Association
- Website: www.awma.org
- Formerly called: International Association for the Prevention of Smoke; Smoke Prevention Association of America; Air Pollution Control Association

Founded in 1907, the Air & Waste Management Association (A&WMA) is a nonprofit, nonpartisan professional organization that enhances knowledge and expertise by providing a neutral forum for the exchange of information, technology, and environmental solutions, professional development, networking, and public education to thousands of members and an even greater audience of environmental professionals worldwide. A&WMA also promotes global environmental responsibility and increases the effectiveness of organizations to make critical decisions that benefit society.

History

A&WMA was founded in June 1907 by a group of smoke inspectors in Milwaukee, Wisconsin. Its original name was the International Association for the Prevention of Smoke, and its name was subsequently changed several times to reflect changes in its members' interests. Specifically, it was renamed the Smoke Prevention Association of America in 1915, the Air Pollution Control Association in 1950, and obtained its current name in 1988.

The Mission of A&WMA is to assist in the professional development and critical environmental decision-making of our members and the worldwide community of environmental practitioners to benefit society.

== Programs ==
The Association offers conferences, workshops, webinars, and courses regarding new developments in the environmental industry. A&WMA's Annual Conference & Exhibition (ACE) addresses current events in environmental technology and regulation and brings environmental professionals from around the world together to share knowledge and collaborate on environmental solutions.
