= Mellon Financial =

Former investment firm located in the US

Mellon Financial Corporation
- Industry: Financial services
- Founded: January 2, 1870; 156 years ago
- Founder: Thomas Mellon
- Defunct: July 2, 2007
- Fate: Merged with Bank of New York to become BNY Mellon
- Successor: The Bank of New York Mellon
- Headquarters: Pittsburgh, Pennsylvania, U.S.
- Website: mellon.com

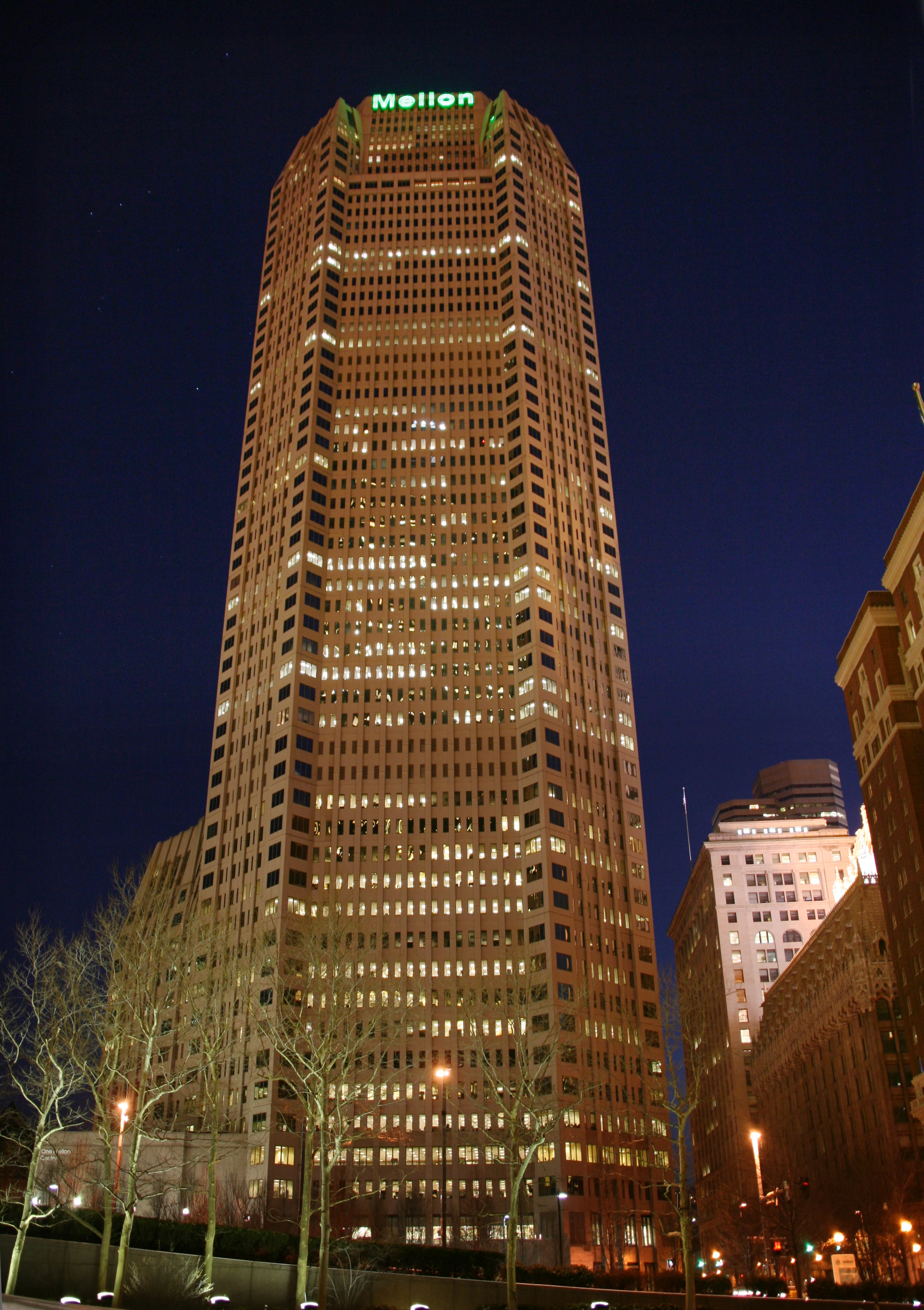
One Mellon Center, the corporate headquarters in Pittsburgh, at night

Mellon Financial Corporation was an American investment firm which was once one of the world's largest money management firms. Based in Pittsburgh, Pennsylvania, it was in the business of institutional and high-net-worth individual asset management, including the Dreyfus family of mutual funds, business banking, and shareholder and investor services. On December 4, 2006, it announced a merger agreement with Bank of New York, to form BNY Mellon. After regulatory and shareholder approval, the banks completed the merger on July 2, 2007.

== History ==
Mellon was opened in January 1870 by Thomas Mellon and his sons Andrew Mellon and Richard B. Mellon, as T. Mellon & Sons' Bank. In 1902, the institution became Mellon National Bank.

Mellon Bank was an important force in the mass production revolution in the United States, especially in the Midwest. The Mellon family using the bank as a proxy had direct involvement with founding the modern aluminium, oil, consumer electronics and financial industries. Alcoa, Gulf Oil (now Chevron-Texaco), Westinghouse (now CBS Corporation and Siemens) and Rockwell, all were directly founded and managed by the bank. U.S. Steel (the world's first billion-dollar corporation), Heinz, General Motors, Koppers and ExxonMobil (as Rockefeller's Standard Oil) were born and nurtured by Mellon.

- In 1920, Andrew left his leadership post of the bank to become the longest serving U.S. Treasury Secretary in history (serving under three separate administrations).
- In 1929, Richard founded Mellbank Corporation. In 1946, Mellon National, Mellbank, and the Union Trust Company merged to form Mellon National Bank and Trust Company.
- A reorganization in 1972 brought about a name change to Mellon Bank, N.A. and the formation of a holding company, Mellon National Corporation.
- In 1983, Mellon bought Girard Bank of Philadelphia and Central Counties Bank of State College, Pennsylvania. The next year, Mellon National Corporation became Mellon Bank Corporation, and purchased Northwest Pennsylvania Corporation of Oil City, Pennsylvania.
- In 1986, Mellon bought Commonwealth National Financial of Harrisburg, Pennsylvania. It is also reported that Mellon operated the 2nd largest financial computing system in the world.
- In 1991, Mellon bought United Penn Bank of Wilkes-Barre, Pennsylvania. The next year, Mellon bought 54 branch offices of Philadelphia-based Philadelphia Savings Fund Society, whose parent company had become insolvent. Philadelphia Savings Fund Society, was the first savings bank in the United States, founded in 1819.
- In 1996, Mellon joined with CIBC to found CIBC Mellon Global Securities Services (CMGSS) in a 50-50 joint venture.
- The Boston Company logo, c. 1993, acquired by Mellon
  In 1993, Mellon bought The Boston Company from American Express and AFCO Credit Corporation from The Continental Corporation. The next year, Mellon merged with the Dreyfus Corporation, bringing its mutual funds under its umbrella.
- 1998 saw Mellon's purchase of United Bankshares, Inc., of Miami, 1st Business Bank of Los Angeles, and Founders Asset Management.
- In 1999, Martin G. McGuinn became chairman and chief executive officer of Mellon Bank Corporation. Mellon Bank Corporation then became Mellon Financial Corporation. Two years later, it sold its retail banking operations to Citizens Financial Group.
- In 2004, Mellon announced it would purchase Safeco Trust Company from Seattle-based Safeco Corporation. The same year, it purchased outstanding shares in London-based Pareto Partners and offered them floor space in Mellon Financial Center (opened earlier in the year).

== Merger with Bank of New York ==
In 2006, Mellon announced its plans to merge with Bank of New York. Talks began when Tom Renyi approached Robert Kelly about a possible amalgamation between the Bank of New York and Mellon Financial Corporation. The $16.5 billion deal ($26.4 billion today) was announced in December 2006 and finalized on July 1, 2007, with Kelly as the chief executive officer (CEO) of the new company, and Renyi as executive chairman. Per the deal, the new Board of Directors is composed of ten directors appointed by the Bank of New York, and eight by Mellon.

The merger was completed July 1, 2007, as The Bank of New York Mellon, headquartered in New York. The deal made it the largest custodian in the financial services industry, and Mellon's asset management business put it among the industry's top ten. The new venture launched its brand identity on October 1, 2007.

These two companies, along with State Street, followed essentially the same evolution. All were originally large diversified financial service providers, particularly in the corporate banking space in the regions they were located in. However, competition in the corporate loans and retail banking businesses saw them jettison these operations in favor of what were believed to be more stable, fee based business: asset management (i.e. investment management in the form of mutual funds and other separately managed accounts) and asset servicing (i.e. corporate trust, stock transfer services and depository receipts).

Mellon is a large provider of what are known as controlled disbursement accounts. These are checking accounts in specialized locations which are given early warning by the Federal Reserve as to what checks will be clearing them. Companies can then transfer the exact amount needed to pay those checks, while then investing the unneeded money or using other funds to pay down debt.

== Mellon Bank CEOs ==
- Frank R. Denton (1946 – February 8, 1963)
- John A. Mayer (February 8, 1963 – August 1, 1974)
- James H. Higgins (August 1, 1974 – March 1, 1981)
- J. David Barnes (March 1, 1981 – April 13, 1987)
- Frank Cahouet (April 13, 1987 – January 1, 1999)
- Martin G. McGuinn (January 1, 1999 – February 13, 2006)
- Robert E. Kelly (February 13, 2006 – July 1, 2007)
