= Thomas Mellon =

Irish-American judge, lawyer and banker (1813–1908)

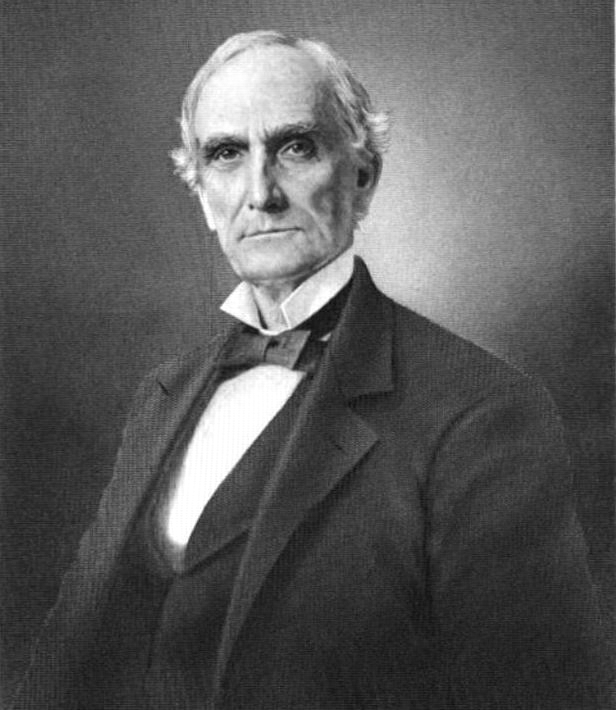
- Born: February 3, 1813; Omagh, County Tyrone, Ireland
- Died: February 3, 1908 (aged 95); Pittsburgh, Pennsylvania U.S.
- Education: University of Pittsburgh
- Occupations: Banker, businessman, judge, lawyer
- Spouse: Sarah Jane Negley (m. 1843)
- Children: 8, including Andrew and Richard

Thomas Mellon (February 3, 1813 – February 3, 1908) was a businessman, judge, and lawyer who was best known as the founder of Mellon Bank and patriarch of the Mellon family of Pittsburgh.

== Early life and education ==
Mellon was born to farmers Andrew Mellon and Rebecca Wauchob on February 3, 1813, at Camp Hill Cottage, Lower Castletown, parish of Omagh, County Tyrone, Ireland. The original family house now forms the centrepiece of the Ulster American Folk Park Museum. His family had come into Ireland from Scotland and Holland around the middle of the seventeenth century. In 1816, his grandfather, Archibald Mellon, emigrated to the United States, settling in Westmoreland County, Pennsylvania. Andrew and his family followed two years later.

Mellon wrote in his autobiography that at the age of ten, he had been struck by "wealth and magnificence I had before no conception of" upon viewing the mansion of prominent landowners Jacob Negley and Barbara Ann Negley. At fourteen, he read The Autobiography of Benjamin Franklin and became inspired by Franklin's rags-to-riches tale. Deciding he would not be a farmer, he enrolled at the University of Pittsburgh, then known as the Western University of Pennsylvania, in October 1834, graduating in 1837.

== Career ==
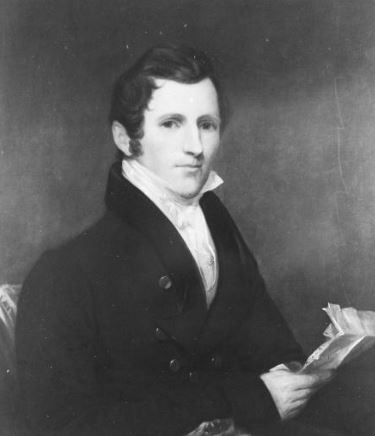
Undated painting of Mellon

After graduation, he obtained work in a Pittsburgh law office, and became clerk for the Allegheny County prothonotary. He was himself admitted to the bar on December 15, 1838, and opened his own law firm, focusing on civil cases.

On August 22, 1843, following a long and frustrating courtship, he married Sarah Jane Negley, daughter of Jacob and Barbara and aunt of James S. Negley. Soon thereafter, he embarked on a long and successful legal career in Pittsburgh. In 1859, he was elected assistant judge of the Allegheny County Court of Common Pleas and on December 1 began a ten-year judicial career.

Mellon invested the proceeds from his legal work shrewdly, buying up large portions of downtown Pittsburgh real estate. In late 1869, he decided to retire from the bench, and rather than return to the legal profession, "concluded to open a banking house." On January 2, 1870, he opened the T. Mellon & Sons' Bank with his sons Andrew W. and Richard B. Above the cast iron door of the original bank building at 145 Smithfield Street was placed a near life-sized statue of his inspiration, Benjamin Franklin.

He nearly lost his estate in the Panic of 1873, an economic depression in which half of Pittsburgh's ninety organized banks and twelve private banks failed—but prevailed and was well placed to prosper when the economy again began to expand. Shrewd investments included real estate holdings in downtown Pittsburgh, coal fields, and a $10,000 loan to Henry Clay Frick in 1871, which would provide the coke for Andrew Carnegie's steel mills.

In 1877, Mellon was approached to finance the Ligonier Valley Railroad. In 1878 he acquired land around the railroad just west of Ligonier, Pennsylvania, where he began a picnic park, Idlewild. Additional land in the Ligonier Valley which he once owned is now the Rolling Rock Club.

On January 5, 1882, he retired from day-to-day management of the bank's affairs, handing it to his 26-year-old son, Andrew. Under A.W. and R.B.'s management, Mellon Bank was by the end of the century the largest banking institution in the country outside of New York. He divested himself of most of the rest of his property on February 3, 1890, leaving it in the hands of his sons.

Mellon died on his 95th birthday, February 3, 1908, at his home in East Liberty. He was survived by his wife, who lived for about a year after his death, and three children. Thomas Mellon and his wife Sarah are buried in Pittsburgh's Allegheny Cemetery.

== Family and personal life ==
Mellon was Presbyterian by faith. Though not devoutly religious, he was a member and supporter of the East Liberty Presbyterian Church, the land for which had been originally contributed by the Negley family.

He maintained a "country house" at 401 North Negley Avenue in East Liberty, where he indulged a passion for horticulture, raising fruit trees and other crops. He also took an interest in the poetry of Robert Burns and in the history of Ireland. He was said to have remarked "the only way to settle the Irish question would be to sink the island."

Thomas and Sarah Mellon had eight children, five of whom survived to adulthood:

- Thomas Alexander Mellon, born June 26, 1844, married to Mary C. Caldwell, sister of Alexander Caldwell, U.S. Senator of Kansas; father of Thomas Alexander Mellon, III and the architect Edward Purcell Mellon.
- James Ross Mellon, born January 14, 1846, married to Rachel Hughey Larimer, daughter of railroad and land baron William Larimer; their son was William Larimer Mellon. James Mellon escaped military service in the Civil War by paying a substitute. Thomas Mellon wrote to James: "A man may be a patriot without risking his own life or sacrificing his health. There are plenty of lives less valuable." A People's History of the United States
- Sarah Emma Mellon (died in childhood).
- Annie Rebecca Mellon (died in childhood).
- Samuel Selwyn Mellon (died 1862, at age 9).
- Andrew William Mellon, born March 24, 1855, died August 26, 1937.
- Richard Beatty Mellon, born March 19, 1858, died December 1, 1933, married to Jennie King, daughter of Alexander and Cordelia King.
- George Negley Mellon, born June 30, 1860, died April 15, 1887.

Mellon entrusted his sons with business ventures from very early ages. By the age of 21, his son Tom had raised, with his son Jim, some $100,000 operating a nursery, lumber yard and construction supply business, and Andrew was managing a theatre at the age of 17. Well-prepared for business, the Mellon family ranked among the wealthiest and most prominent industrialists in the United States by the time of Judge Mellon's death in 1908.

== See also ==
- List of Mellon family foundations
