= Mellon family =

American banking, judicial, and political family

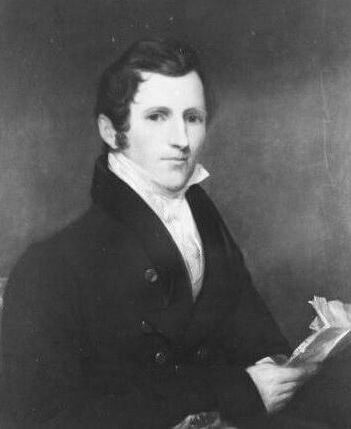
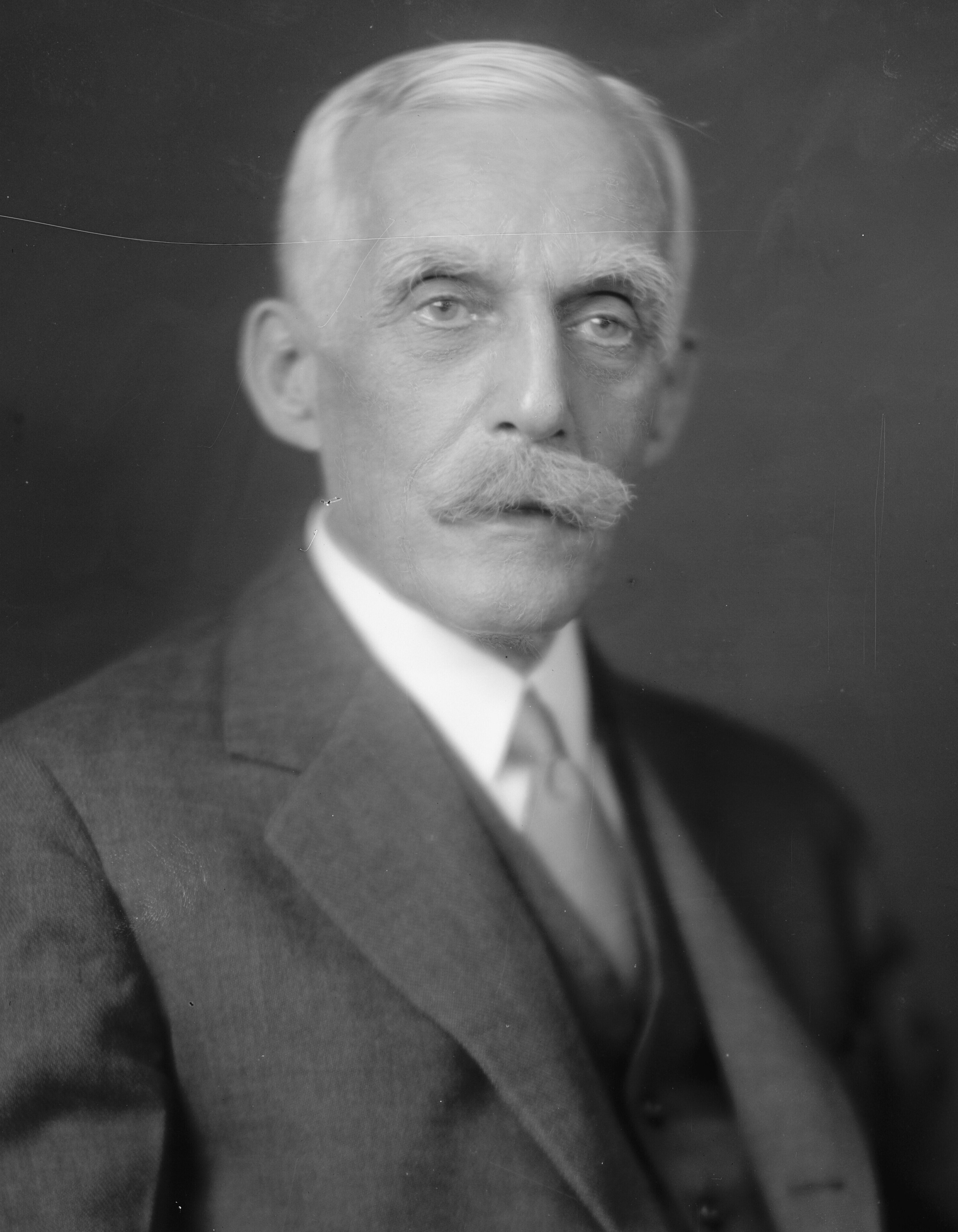
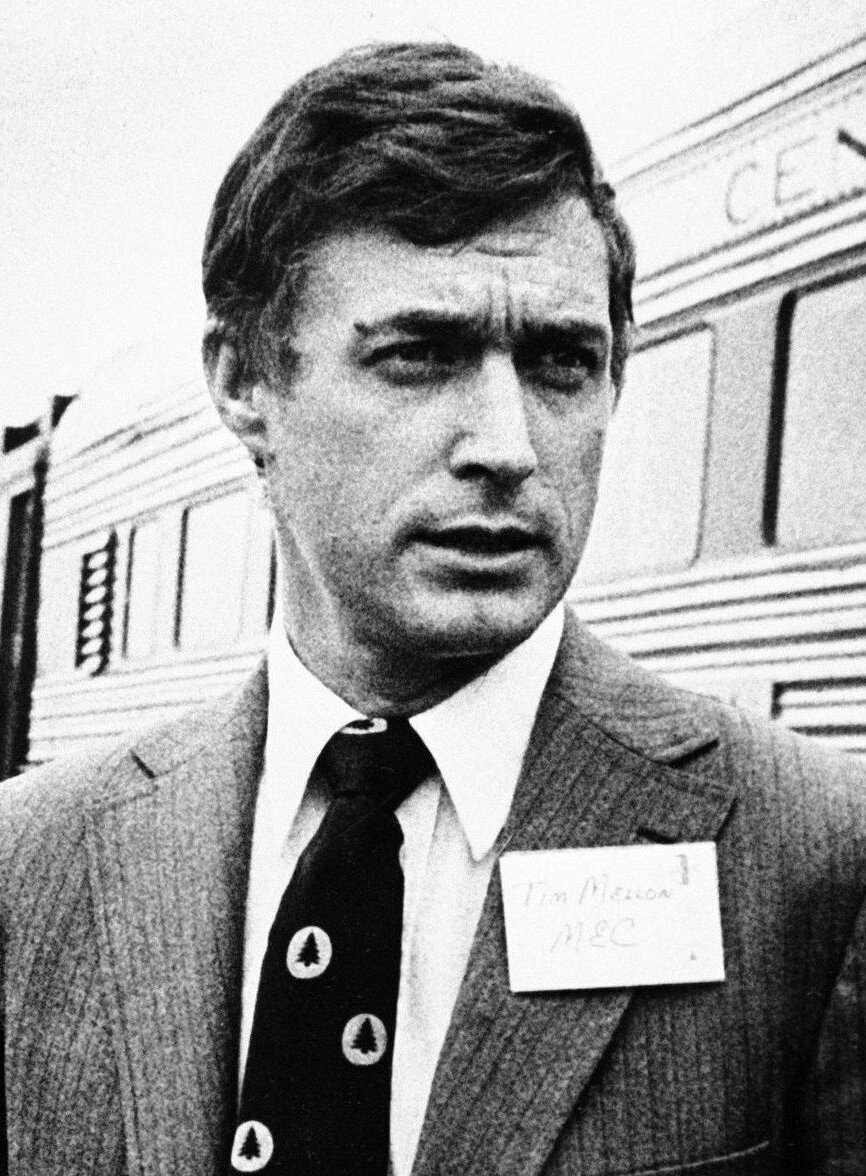
- Thomas Mellon Andrew Mellon Timothy Mellon
- Current region: Pittsburgh, Pennsylvania, U.S.
- Origin: County Tyrone, Ireland
- Founded: 1816; 210 years ago
- Founder: Archibald Mellon
- Current head: Timothy Mellon
- Connected families: Bruce family Larimer family
- Estates: Rokeby Stables; Oak Spring

The Mellon family is a wealthy and influential American family from Pittsburgh, Pennsylvania. The family includes Andrew Mellon, one of the longest serving U.S. Treasury Secretaries, while other members worked in the judicial, banking, financial, business, and political professions. Other notable figures include the prominent banker R.B. Mellon and his son R.K. Mellon, who provided funding and leadership for the first Pittsburgh Renaissance.

== History ==
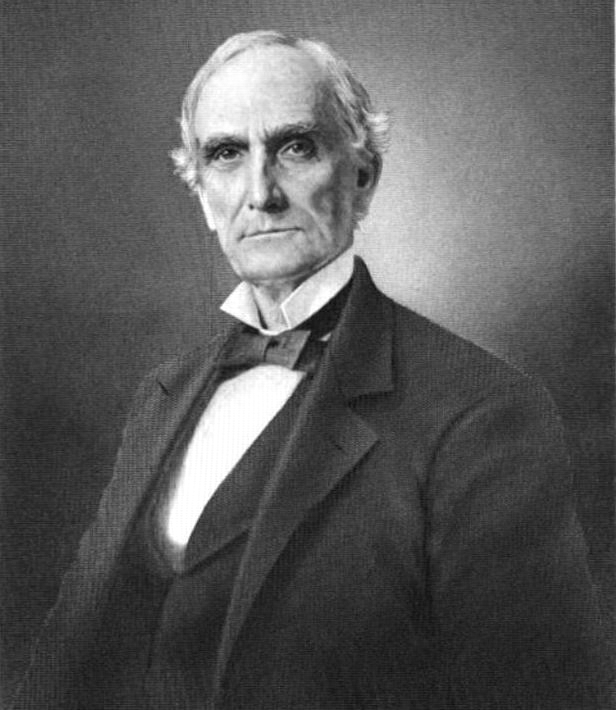
Thomas Mellon, founder of the Mellon banking dynasty

The American branch of the Mellon family traces its origins to County Tyrone, Northern Ireland. In 1816, Archibald Mellon emigrated from Ireland to the United States and set up residence in Westmoreland County, Pennsylvania. Two years later, Archibald was joined by his son, Andrew, and his family.

The family's wealth originated with Mellon Bank, founded in 1869 by Archibald's grandson, Thomas Mellon. Under the direction of Thomas's son, Andrew William Mellon, the Mellons became principal investors and majority owners of Gulf Oil (which merged with Chevron Corporation in 1985), Alcoa (since 1886), The Pittsburgh Tribune-Review (since 1970), Koppers (since 1912), New York Shipbuilding (1899–1968) and Carborundum Corporation, as well as their major financial and ownership influence on Westinghouse Electric, H.J. Heinz Company, Newsweek, U.S. Steel, First Boston Corporation and General Motors. The family bank later became part of BNY Mellon.

The family also founded the National Gallery of Art in Washington, D.C., donating both art works and funds, and is a patron to the University of Pittsburgh, Carnegie Mellon University, Yale University, the Hôpital Albert Schweitzer in Haiti, and with art the University of Virginia. Carnegie Mellon University, and its Mellon College of Science, is named in honor of the family, as well as for its founder, Andrew Carnegie, who was a close associate of the Mellons. The family's founding patriarch was Judge Thomas Mellon (1813–1908), the son of Andrew Mellon and Rebecca Wauchob, who were Scotch-Irish farmers from Camp Hill Cottage, in Lower Castletown, County Tyrone, Ireland, and emigrated to what is now the Pittsburgh suburb of north-central Westmoreland County, Pennsylvania. The family can be divided into four branches: the descendants of Thomas Alexander Mellon Jr, of James Ross Mellon, of Andrew William Mellon, and of Richard Beatty Mellon. The Mellon family are members of the Episcopal Church.

== Prominent members ==
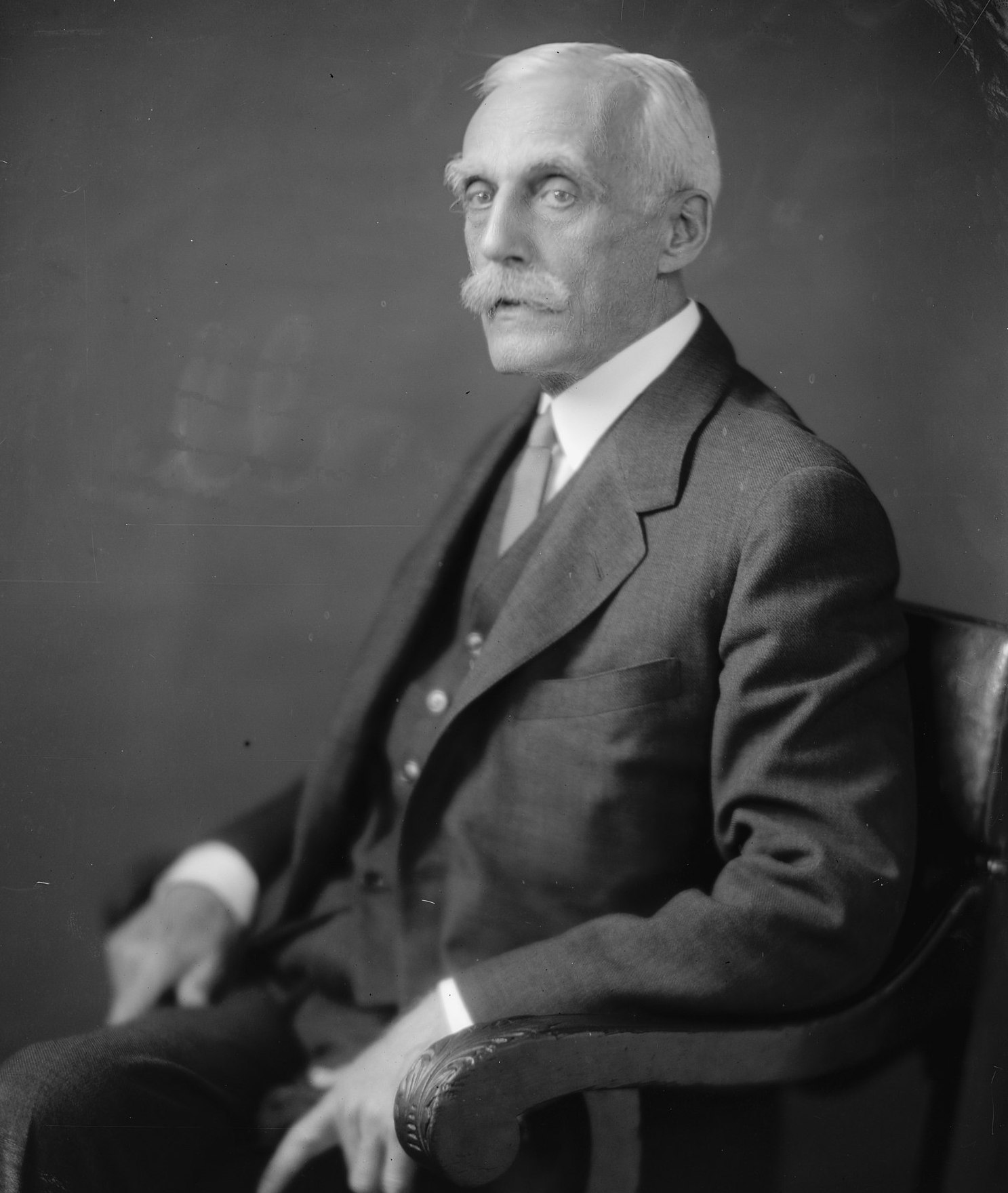
Andrew Mellon, prominent banker and U.S. Secretary of the Treasury throughout the 1920s

- Thomas Mellon (1813–1908), judge and founder of the Mellon Bank; married Sarah Jane Negley of Pittsburgh. As a boy he decided to abandon his parents' farming lifestyle for law and banking in the city after reading Benjamin Franklin's autobiography.
- Andrew William Mellon (1855–1937), banker and one of the longest-serving U.S. Treasury secretaries; namesake of the Andrew Mellon Building and Andrew W. Mellon Auditorium, both in Washington, D.C.
- Richard Beatty Mellon (1858–1933), banker, industrialist and philanthropist; married Jennie Taylor King
- William Larimer Mellon, Sr. (1868–1949), a founder of the Gulf Oil Corporation
- Matthew T. Mellon 1897–1992, scholar of history and literature, Nazi Party supporter, and Colby College trustee
- Richard King Mellon (1899–1970), financier, general, and philanthropist; married Constance Prosser McCaulley
- Sarah Mellon (1903–1965), heiress of investments in Mellon Bank, Gulf Oil and Alcoa; her husband was Alan Magee Scaife
- Paul Mellon (1907–1999), American philanthropist and an owner/breeder of thoroughbred racehorses. He was married to Rachel Lambert Mellon.
- William Larimer Mellon, Jr. (1910–1989), founder of the Hôpital Albert Schweitzer Haiti
- Cordelia Scaife May (1928–2005), recluse and funder of multiple anti-immigration organizations
- Richard Mellon Scaife (1932–2014), the chief sponsor of The Heritage Foundation and publisher of the Pittsburgh Tribune-Review since 1970; first marriage was to Frances L. Gilmore (born December 2, 1934), second marriage was to Margaret "Ritchie" Battle (1947–2005)
- Timothy Mellon (b. 1942), chairman and majority owner of Pan Am Systems, a transportation holding company that was based in Portsmouth, New Hampshire and was subsequently sold to CSX Transportation.
- Matthew Taylor Mellon II (1964–2018), a chairman of the Republican Party Finance of New York and served as a regent director of finance for the Republican National Committee; founded or participated in multiple start-ups such as Jimmy Choo, Harrys of London, Hanley Mellon, Marquis Jets, Arrival Aviation and Challenge Capital Partners
- Mike Monroney (1902–1980), United States Senator from Oklahoma who wrote and sponsored legislation such as the Federal Aviation Act of 1958 and the Automobile Information Disclosure Act of 1958, the latter of which made him the namesake of the Monroney sticker; married to Mary Ellen Mellon of the Mellon family
- Christopher Mellon Former Deputy Assistant Secretary of Defense for Intelligence.

== Family tree ==
- Thomas Mellon (1813–1908) ∞ 1843: Sarah Jane Negley (1817–1909)
  - Thomas Alexander Mellon, Jr., (1844–1899) ∞ Mary C. Caldwell (1847–1902), the sister of Alexander Caldwell
    - Thomas Alexander Mellon, III (1873–1948) ∞ Helen McLanahan Wightman (1871–1961)
      - Edward Purcell Mellon, II ∞ Louise Grubbs
        - Thomas Alexander Mellon, IV
      - Helen S. Mellon (1914–2007) ∞ 1936: Adolph William Schmidt (1904–2000)
        - Helen Schmidt ∞ unk. Claire
        - Thomas Mellon Schmidt (b. 1940)
    - Edward Purcell Mellon (1875–1953) ∞ Ethel Churchill Humphrey (1880–1938)
      - Jane Caldwell Mellon (1917–2013) ∞ (1) Craigh Leonard ∞ (2) Robinson Simonds (1906–2000)
        - Edward M. Leonard
        - Craigh Leonard, Jr.
        - Stephanie Leonard
    - Mary Caldwell Mellon (1884–1975) ∞ (1) John Herman Kampmann (1880–1957) ∞ (2) Samuel Alfred McClung (1880–1945)
      - John Herman Kampmann, Jr. (1907–1940)
      - Mary Mellon Kampmann (1908–1995) ∞ Lawrence Deen Schwartz (1909–1957)
      - Samuel Alfred McClung, III (1918–2015) ∞ Adelaide "Adie" Smith (1919–2000)
      - Isabel Edith McClung (1920–1967) ∞ Charles Newton Abernethy, Jr. (1913–1990)
      - Cynthia Mellon McClung (1921–1991) ∞ Stephen Stone, Jr. (1915–1962)
  - James Ross Mellon (1846–1934) ∞ Rachel Hughey Larimer (1847–1919), the daughter of William Larimer
    - William Larimer Mellon (1868–1949) ∞ Mary Hill Taylor
      - Matthew Taylor Mellon (1897–1992) ∞ (1) 1931: (div.) Gertrud Altegoer (1909–2005) ∞ (2) Jane Bartrum
        - Karl Negley Mellon (1938–1983) ∞ Anne Stokes Bright
          - Christopher Mellon (b. 1957) Former Deputy Assistant Secretary of Defense for Intelligence.
            - Hunter Mellon (b. 2001)
            - Aiden Mellon (b. 2004)
          - Matthew Taylor Mellon, II (1964–2018) ∞ (1) 2000: (div. 2005) Tamara Yeardye (b. 1967) ∞ (2) Nicole Hanley
            - Araminta Mellon (b. 2002)
            - Force Mellon (b. 2011)
            - Olympia Mellon (b. 2013)
        - James Ross Mellon, II (b. 1942) ∞ Vivian Ruesch, the daughter of Hans Ruesch
      - Rachel Larimer Mellon (1899–2006) ∞ John Fawcett Walton, Jr. (1893–1974)
        - Farley Walton ∞ Joshua Clyde Whetzel, Jr. (1921–2012)
          - Joshua Clyde Whetzel, III ∞ Marion Plunkett
          - Rachel Walton Whetzel ∞ Richard Casselman
          - Thomas Porter Whetzel
          - William Mellon Whetzel ∞ (1) 1978: (div.) Patricia Joan McGarey ∞ (2) Camilla F.
        - Mary Walton ∞ Walter J. P. Curley, Jr.
        - John Fawcett Walton, III ∞ Phyllis Walton
        - James Mellon Walton (1930–2022) ∞ Ellen Carroll
          - James Mellon Walton, Jr. ∞ Elizabeth Andrews Orr
      - Margaret Lederle Mellon (1901–1998) ∞ (1) 1924: Alexander Laughlin (d. 1926) ∞ (2) 1928: Thomas Hitchcock, Jr. (1900–1944)
        - Alexander Mellon Laughlin (b. 1925)
        - Louise Eustis Hitchcock
        - Margaret Mellon Hitchcock
        - Thomas Hitchcock, III
        - William Mellon Hitchcock
      - William Larimer Mellon, Jr. (1910–1989) ∞ (1) 1930: (div. 1938) Grace Rowley ∞ (2) 1946: Gwen Grant Mellon (née Rawson; 1911–2000), former wife of John de Groot Rawson
        - William Larimer Mellon, III (1933–1963) ∞ Katherine LeGrand Council
    - Sarah Lucille Mellon (1887–1968) ∞ (1) Alexander Grange ∞ (2) George S. Hasbrouck ∞ (3) Sidney J. Holloway
  - Sarah Emma Mellon, who died in childhood
  - Annie Rebecca Mellon, who died in childhood
  - Samuel Selwyn Mellon, who died 1862, at age 9
  - Andrew William Mellon (1855–1937) ∞ 1900: (div. 1912) Nora Mary McMullen (1879–1973)
    - Ailsa Mellon Bruce (1901–1969) ∞ 1926: (div. 1945) David Kirkpatrick Este Bruce (1898–1977)
      - Audrey Mellon Bruce (1934–1967) ∞ 1955: Stephen Currier (d. 1967), son of Mary Warburg
        - Andrea Bruce Currier (b. 1956) ∞ 1980: Donald Wright Patterson, Jr. (1939)
          - Justin Bruce Patterson ∞ 2013: Anna Elizabeth Burke
        - Lavinia Currier ∞ Joel McCleary
        - Michael Stephen Currier (1961–1998) ∞ Karin Griscom
    - Paul Mellon (1907–1999) ∞ (1) 1935: Mary Conover Brown (1904–1946) ∞ (2) 1948: Rachel Lambert Mellon (1910–2014), former wife of Stacy Barcroft Lloyd Jr
      - Timothy Mellon (b. 1943)
      - Catherine Conover Mellon ∞ 1957: (div. 1973) John W. Warner III (1927–2021)
        - Virginia Warner
        - John William Warner, IV (b. 1962) ∞ Shannon Ford Hamm (b. 1965)
        - Mary Warner
  - Richard Beatty Mellon (1858–1933) ∞ Jennie King (d. 1938)
    - Richard King Mellon (1899–1970) ∞ 1936: Constance Mary (née Prosser) McCaulley (later Burrell; 1910–1980)
      - Richard Prosser Mellon (1939–2020) ∞ (1) Gertrude Adams (1939–2003) (2) Kathryn Dybdal
        - Richard Adams Mellon ∞ Alex Mellon
        - Armour Negley Mellon ∞ Sophie Mellon
      - Cassandra King Mellon (b. 1940) ∞ (1) George M. Henderson ∞ (2) 1979: Edwin Van Rensselaer Milbury
        - Christina Mellon Henderson ∞ 1996: Scott Robert McBroom
        - Bruce King Mellon Henderson
      - Constance Barber Mellon (1941–1983) ∞ William Russell Grace Byers (d. 1999) (brother in law of Joseph Verner Reed Jr.) ∞ (2) 1971: (div. 1973) J. Carter Brown (1934–2002)
        - William Russell Grace Byers, Jr. (b. 1965)
        - Alison Mellon Byers (b. 1967)
      - Seward Prosser Mellon (b. 1942)
    - Sarah Cordelia Mellon (1903–1965) ∞ Alan Magee Scaife (1900–1958)
      - Cordelia Scaife May (1928–2005) ∞ (1) 1949: (div. 1950) (1) Herbert A. May, Jr. ∞ (2) 1973: Robert Duggan (1926/7–1974)
      - Richard Mellon Scaife (1932–2014) ∞ (1) 1956: (div. 1991) Frances L. Gilmore (b. 1934) ∞ (2) 1991: (div. 2012) Margaret "Ritchie" Battle (b. 1947)
        - Jennie K. Scaife (1963–2018)
        - David N. Scaife (b. 1966)
  - George Negley Mellon (1860–1887)

== Network ==
=== Associates ===
The following is a list of figures closely aligned with or subordinate to the Mellon family.

- Edward Goodrich Acheson
- Diamond Jim Brady
- Alexander Caldwell
- Arthur Vining Davis
- William Donner
- Joseph Duveen
- David E. Finley Jr.
- Henry Clay Frick
- James M. Guffey
- Joseph R. Grundy
- Henry John Heinz II
- Philander C. Knox
- Henry W. Oliver
- David A. Reed
- Adolph W. Schmidt
- Arthur Sixsmith
- John W. Warner III
- Cyrus Woods

=== Businesses ===
The following is a list of companies in which the Mellon family have held a controlling or otherwise significant interest.

- Alcoa
- Boston and Maine Railroad
- Brooklyn Union Gas Company
- Carborundum Corporation
- Crane Company
- Crucible Steel Company
- Delaware and Hudson Railway
- First Boston Corporation
- General Reinsurance Corporation
- Gulf Oil
- H.K. Porter, Inc.
- Idlewild Park
- Koppers
- Ligonier Valley Railroad
- McClintic-Marshall Construction Company
- Maine Central Railroad
- Medusa Corporation
- Mellon National Bank
- Mellon Suncoast Properties, Inc.
- Monongahela River Coal Company
- Newsweek
- New York Shipbuilding Corporation
- Old Overholt
- Pan American Airways (1998–2004)
- Perma Treat
- Pittsburgh Coal Company
- Pittsburgh Tribune-Review
- Rokeby Stables
- Sacramento Union
- Standard Steel Car Company
- Texas Gulf Sulphur Company
- Virginian Railway
- Westinghouse Electric Corporation

=== Philanthropy and nonprofit institutions ===
The following is a list of philanthropies and other non-profit institutions which were founded by or have otherwise been closely tied to the Mellon family.

- Allegheny Foundation
- Andrew W. Mellon Foundation
- Bollingen Foundation
- Carnegie Mellon University
- Carthage Foundation
- Center for Immigration Studies
- Colcom Foundation
- Ezra Stiles College
- Federation for American Immigration Reform
- Hôpital Albert Schweitzer Haiti
- Jacqueline Kennedy Garden
- KQV
- Laurel Foundation
- Mellon Trust
- Morse College
- National Gallery of Art
- National Legal and Policy Center
- National Portrait Gallery (United States)
- NumbersUSA
- Paul Mellon Centre for Studies in British Art
- Rachel Mellon Walton Fund
- Richard King Mellon Foundation
- Rolling Rock Club
- Scaife Family Foundation
- Sarah Scaife Foundation
- University of Pittsburgh
- Yale Center for British Art

== Buildings, estates, and historic sites ==
- Andrew Mellon Building
- Andrew W. Mellon Auditorium
- Beechwood Farms Nature Reserve
- Cape Hatteras National Seashore
- Cathedral of Learning
- Dune House
- East Liberty Market
- East Liberty Presbyterian Church
- Gulf Tower
- Maurepas Swamp Wildlife Management Area
- Mellon National Bank Building
- Mellon Park
- Mellon Square
- Oak Spring Garden
- Penguin Court
- Scallop Path
- Sky Meadows State Park
- White House Rose Garden
