= James Ross Mellon =

American writer (born 1942)

- Born: 1942 (age 83–84)
- Citizenship: British Overseas Territories citizen
- Education: Yale University
- Occupations: Author, Safarist
- Spouse: Vivian Rusch
- Father: Matthew T. Mellon
- Relatives: William Mellon (grandfather); Karl Negley Mellon (brother); Matthew Mellon (nephew); Christopher Mellon (nephew)

James Ross Mellon (born 1942), variously known as "Jay" and "Jamie", is an author and safarist. He is a member of the Mellon family and has been called the patriarch of the branch of the family descended from William Larimer Mellon Sr. Born in the United States to Matthew and Gertrude Mellon, he later renounced his American citizenship and became a British Overseas Territories citizen while taking up residence in Monaco.

== Early life and education ==
James Mellon is the second son of Matthew T. Mellon and Gertrude Mellon. According to Mellon family chronicler David Koskoff, he has a different personality from his late brother, Karl. He attended St. Paul's School and graduated from Yale University.

== Career ==
According to Koskoff, James became fascinated with guns at an early age. He was an accomplished big game hunter who undertook a number of safaris, writing a book African Hunter about hunting in Africa generally, and his hunts specifically. In 1969, he moved to Delhi, India, which he used as a jumping off point to undertake exotic animal hunts across India, Afghanistan, Nepal, Mongolia, Iran, Pakistan, and Thailand.

Mellon renounced his United States citizenship in 1977 and took up residence in Monaco, while maintaining a penthouse in New York City. He is a British Overseas Territories citizen.

A second edition of African Hunter, published in the 1980s, was sold exclusively by Abercrombie & Fitch. In 2011, Mellon authored a biography of Thomas Mellon, The Judge: A Life of Thomas Mellon, Founder of a Fortune.

By the early 2000s, James was being referred to as the patriarch of the Mellon family.

=== Finances ===
Mellon was named in the Offshore Leaks files released by the International Consortium of Investigative Journalists (ICIJ) in 2013. According to the ICIJ, he "used four companies in the BVI [British Virgin Islands] and Liechtenstein to trade securities and transfer tens of millions of dollars among offshore bank accounts he controlled... He often used third parties' names as directors and shareholders of his companies rather than his own".

In the 2020s, he unsuccessfully fought a claim of tax delinquency brought against him by the IRS, arguing he had no tax obligation to the United States due to his primarily foreign residency and citizenship; according to James, his American home was occupied exclusively by wife Vivian, the pair living "interesting, separate lives".

== Personal life ==
In 1985, Mellon married Hans Ruesch's daughter, Vivian, in a ceremony in Italy. He was, at the time, described by society columnist Aileen Mehle as having been "at the top of the hit parade of most eligible bachelors for years".

According to Koskoff, he was a father figure to his nephew, Christopher Mellon, who was estranged from his own father, Karl — James's brother.
