= Christopher Mellon =

American UFO advocate and former official

Christopher Karl Mellon
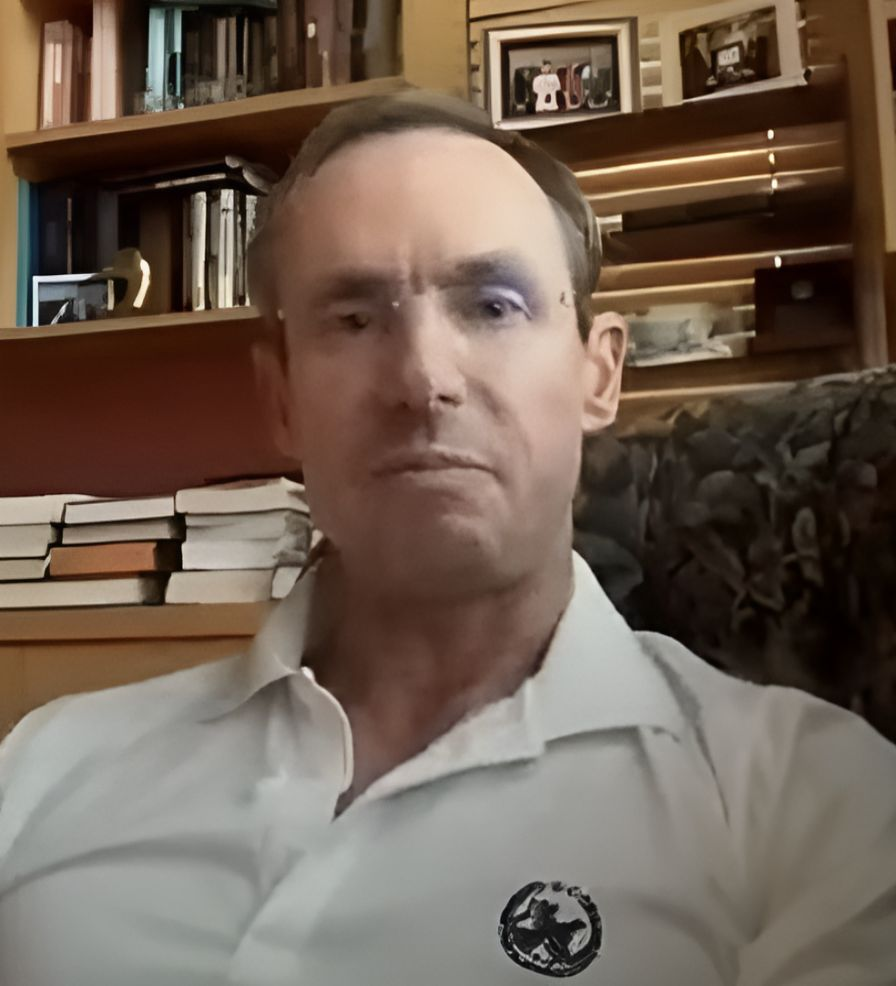
- Christopher Mellon in 2023
- Education: Colby College (BA); Yale University (MA)
- Years active: 1985–present
- Organization(s): United States Senate, Department of Defense, Advanced Aerospace Threat Identification Program, To the Stars Academy of Arts and Sciences, The Galileo Project
- Known for: Congressional staff, intelligence community oversight, UFOs
- Notable work: Law that created United States Special Operations Command
- Television: Unidentified: Inside America's UFO Investigation
- Political party: Republican
- Movement: Disclosure movement
- Relatives: Matthew Mellon
- Family: Mellon family
- Website: christophermellon.net

Christopher Karl Mellon is an American former Department of Defense and United States Senate civilian staff member whose career from 1985 to 2017 focused on defense and intelligence oversight. He is an advocate for transparency in government investigations of UFOs, and a member of the Mellon family.

Mellon began his career by working for the U.S. Senate Intelligence Committee, later serving as the Deputy Assistant Secretary of Defense for Intelligence for the Clinton and Bush administrations. He helped draft legislation establishing the United States Special Operations Command and took part in a Department of Defense investigation of unidentified aerial phenomena. During his years of staff service on Capitol Hill and at the Department of Defense, Mellon worked for senators William Cohen, John Chafee, John Warner, and Jay Rockefeller, and under Secretary of Defense Donald Rumsfeld. Mellon worked as part of a committee tasked with oversight of the U.S. Department of Defense's special access programs (SAPs). He was involved with the disclosure of the Advanced Aerospace Threat Identification Program (AATIP) and gave the Pentagon UFO videos to the New York Times as part of his broader efforts to raise awareness about UFOs.

== Early life and education ==
His parents, Karl Negley Mellon and Ann, met as teenagers and later eloped. Karl, a trucker and fishing boat crewman, divorced Ann and was estranged from Christopher. Mellon was raised in inner city Chicago in circumstances described as "difficult". He was declined enlistment in the United States Army owing to his response to an application question that asked about recent marijuana use, according to Mellon family biographer David E. Koskoff. Mellon has a sister, Andrea, and a brother, Matthew, who died in 2018.

=== Education ===
Mellon graduated from Loomis Chaffee and enrolled at Colby College, where he was initiated into Kappa Delta Rho, worked part-time coaching youth soccer, and considered dropping out of college. He received a Bachelor of Arts in economics from Colby and a master's degree in international relations from Yale University, with a concentration in finance and management. Koskoff described Mellon in his youth as popular, and "a 1960s college boy at a 1950s college" in regard to his time at Colby and Waterville.

=== Family ===
Mellon is a member of the Mellon family and a descendant of both Thomas Mellon and William Larimer Mellon Sr. He is the grandson of Matthew T. Mellon and Gertrud (née Altegoer) Mellon. The Mellon family began fracturing into largely disconnected branches in the 1930s. Koskoff wrote that the extended Mellon family is "a large, amorphous group" with little contact among branches and "virtually no sense of 'Mellonhood'". Mellon is a member of a Pennsylvanian branch of the family; in 2024, Vanity Fair reported that the Pennsylvanians and Virginians rarely meet. During his college years at Colby, Koskoff reported that Mellon had not read any of the family writings other than Matthew's books and his uncle James Ross Mellon's African Hunter. He maintained little contact with his wider Mellon kin, but met other family members when James took him hunting at the Rolling Rock Club. In adulthood, Mellon redeveloped a relationship with his father, Karl, prior to the elder Mellon's death by suicide in 1983.

== Government career ==
Beginning in 1985, Mellon served in various United States Senate staff positions on Capitol Hill, including a decade as a professional staffer of the Senate Select Committee on Intelligence (SSCI), before joining the Department of Defense in 1997. In 2003, Mellon returned as a Senate staffer for the SSCI.

=== United States Special Operations Command ===
As a legislative assistant to William Cohen, Mellon participated in drafting the bill that led to the creation of the United States Special Operations Command (USSOCOM or SOCOM) in the National Defense Authorization Act for 1987 (NDAA). William G. Boykin, who would go on to become Deputy Under Secretary of Defense for Intelligence, reported that Mellon encouraged Cohen to take a leading role in the effort. By 1985, Cohen and Mellon were interested in reforming United States Special Operations Forces (SOF). Cohen was approached by "former special operations people" seeking his help in "helping to rebuild SOF."

In 1985, House of Representatives staffer Ted Lunger approached Mellon to win Senate backing for Dan Daniel's special operations reform bill. Cohen and Mellon's interest in SOF reform intensified after the October 1985 Senate Committee on Armed Services report Defense Reorganization: The Need for Change. At a preliminary conference committee meeting, Mellon and his staff team argued the Daniel bill conflicted with the Goldwater–Nichols Act, whereas the Senate's Cohen–Nunn approach still let the Department of Defense craft its own long-term solution. The 1986 reform bill from Cohen's office, largely written by Mellon, relied on ideas from Senate Armed Services Committee staff member Jim Locher. While drafting the bill that would lead to the creation of USSOCOM, Mellon was unaware of an earlier Strategic Services (STRATSERCOM) proposal on the SOF topic. Boykin noted in The Origins of the United States Special Operations Command that Mellon contributed many of the ideas in the reform bill related to low-intensity conflicts. In a 1988 interview Mellon recalled that the SOF problem had been unknown to him when he first began drafting the legislation in early 1986. Mellon credited both Locher and Andrew Krepinevich's work in The Army and Vietnam.

=== Department of Defense tenure ===
When Cohen became United States Secretary of Defense (SecDef) in 1997, Mellon accompanied him to the Pentagon as part of Cohen's transition team. After the transition, he was appointed Coordinator for Advanced Concepts and Program Integration in the Office of the Under Secretary of Defense for Policy, focusing on encryption and information assurance issues. From November 1997 to June 1998, Mellon served as Special Assistant to the Secretary of Defense for Intelligence Policy, providing advice on intelligence matters, and from June 1998 through November 1999 he was Deputy Assistant Secretary of Defense for Security and Information Operations.

In November 1999, Mellon took a noncareer (political) appointment in the Senior Executive Service as Deputy Assistant Secretary of Defense for Intelligence within what was then the Office of the Assistant Secretary of Defense for Command, Control, Communications and Intelligence (OASD(C3I)). Over the course of his Pentagon tenure, he served under Presidents Bill Clinton and George W. Bush, and under SecDef Donald Rumsfeld.

=== Return to Capitol Hill ===
In February 2003, Senator Jay Rockefeller hired Mellon as minority staff director of the SSCI. According to Gizmodo, during his government service he served on a Defense Department committee with oversight of special access programs (SAPs). In Dark Territory: The Secret History of Cyber War, author and journalist Fred Kaplan wrote of Mellon's involvement during his Senate career with the National Security Agency and J. Michael "Mike" McConnell, former Director of National Intelligence (DNI), and Mellon's research into the NSA's budget. In Sabotage: America's Enemies Within the CIA, Rowan Scarborough wrote that, at the White House's behest, Mellon and his Republican counterpart, William D. Duhnke III, were excluded from briefings on the NSA warrantless surveillance program. Journalist Keith Kloor wrote that Mellon "oversaw the Pentagon's most sensitive and closely held 'black' programs."

Following the 2003 leak of a Democratic staff memorandum drafted for SSCI vice-chair Rockefeller that proposed leveraging cooperation, issuing a dissent, or pursuing a Democrats-only investigation to highlight potential administration misuse of pre-war Iraq intelligence, Republican committee members said the document aimed to discredit the panel's pending report and demanded Democratic repudiation of its partisan implications. In a November 2003 Wall Street Journal editorial column attacking the leaked memo, the editorial identified Mellon as an aide whose dismissal would be necessary to restore bipartisan credibility. In a January 2004 Insight on the News piece, writer J. Michael Waller, citing unnamed Senate and Defense sources, claimed that Mellon had "built his own autonomous apparatus" on the committee that pursued probes of senior Pentagon and State Department officials. In a November 14, 2003 Wall Street Journal letter, Senator Richard J. Durbin wrote that Rockefeller appointed Mellon, a registered Republican, as minority staff director of the SSCI. Durbin further noted that Mellon had earlier served the committee as deputy minority staff director for Republican senators William Cohen, John Chafee, and John Warner, which he cited as evidence of a bipartisan record.

In 2006, Mellon returned to southwestern Pennsylvania after decades of defense and intelligence work in the Washington, D.C., area, settling in Ligonier, Pennsylvania, home to many of his extended family. He served on the board of the Carnegie Museum of Natural History and became involved with startup companies, including in the wireless power transfer field.

== UFO investigations ==
=== The Pentagon UFO videos ===
The Washington Post in 2017 identified Mellon as having worked for the Advanced Aerospace Threat Identification Program (AATIP), the 2007–2012 Pentagon program that investigated unidentified aerial phenomena (UAP), that was also disclosed by a New York Times article in the same year. Popular Mechanics reported that Mellon, while outside of government, had been invited to an AATIP meeting by a Central Intelligence Agency (CIA) acquaintance. Unsuccessful in contacting then-SecDef James Mattis about UAP-related topics, Mellon afterward focused on raising awareness about UFO- and UAP-related issues.

In 2017, Mellon became a member of To the Stars Academy of Arts and Sciences (TTSA), an organization founded to research UAP-related topics, and worked as a paid adviser. TTSA described Mellon as its "National Security Affairs Advisor", and Art Levine wrote in The Washington Spectator that Mellon "lent credibility by his association." Mellon stated he was personally recruited by Tom DeLonge, TTSA's founder, after the musician read an article Mellon had written. At TTSA's first press conference, Mellon unveiled "photographic evidence of a UFO" that turned out to be a party balloon; journalist Art Levine noted ironically that Mellon's "prestige has not been dimmed" despite this.

Mellon and TTSA played a role in the publication of the New York Times report "Glowing Auras and 'Black Money': The Pentagon's Mysterious U.F.O. Program", with freelance journalist and UFO proponent Leslie Kean telling The New Yorker's Gideon Lewis-Kraus that Mellon and Luis Elizondo were responsible for the creation of the article. Mellon, along with other TTSA members, met Kean on October 4, 2017, at an arranged meeting in a hotel near the Pentagon. According to Space.com, Mellon helped provide to the New York Times what became known as the Pentagon UFO videos. Mellon and Elizondo were credited for bringing the videos made by pilots from the United States Navy aircraft carriers USS Nimitz and USS Theodore Roosevelt to TTSA. In the 2020 documentary film The Phenomenon, Mellon stated he was the source of the videos. Mellon departed TTSA at the end of 2020.

=== Further UFO affairs ===
The Australian Broadcasting Corporation and Issues in Science and Technology highlighted a 2018 column by Mellon in the Washington Post, discussing lack of interest in UAP investigations by the Pentagon, despite repeated military encounters with them. Writing for the National Academies, Keith Kloor credited Mellon's piece in the Washington Post for moving UFOs, "a topic long confined to the tabloids", to being a "serious news story". Kloor also noted that Mellon was "influential" for leading the Senate and House Committees on Armed Services to seek information in regard to AATIP and Pentagon UFO investigations, and to interview military pilots who reported UFOs. In 2020, then-Senator Marco Rubio included language in the National Defense Authorization Act for Fiscal Year 2021 which directed the DNI and SecDef to create "a detailed analysis of unidentified aerial phenomena data and intelligence reporting", which "drew heavily" from proposals by Mellon to the Congress. Writing for Politico, Bryan Bender credited Mellon as having "effectively drafted" the legislation calling for the report. After then-DNI John Ratcliffe disclosed on Fox News that some UFOs lacked "good explanations", the Washington Post reported Mellon supported the disclosures.

According to a 2021 interview with Bill Whitaker on 60 Minutes, Mellon began his advocacy due to his views on investigations of UFOs by the government and surrounding secrecy matters. Vox reported that Mellon discounted the possibility that the unidentified objects were U.S. military aircraft, citing his security clearance as grounds for believing he would have known of such a program. In Vox, journalist Dylan Matthews questioned whether that reasoning was sufficient to exclude secret U.S. military programs, while also citing contemporaneous New York Times reporting that a forthcoming government report was expected to support Mellon's conclusion.

The History Channel documentary series Unidentified: Inside America's UFO Investigation listed Mellon as a featured contributor. In 2021, The Galileo Project at Harvard University named Mellon a research affiliate, joining founder Avi Loeb's effort to search for extraterrestrial intelligence or technologies on and near Earth and to identify the nature of UFOs. In 2023, Art Levine reported in the Washington Spectator that Mellon had lobbied in support of the National Defense Authorization Act for Fiscal Year 2022, which included provisions to investigate UFO-related topics and created the Pentagon's All-domain Anomaly Resolution Office. Mellon has been associated with the UFO disclosure movement, and appears in The Age of Disclosure, a 2025 American documentary film. Mellon has also authored editorial pieces for Politico.

== Personal life ==
As of 2020, Mellon is married. He is a fan of Jimi Hendrix.

== See also ==
- NSA surveillance, intelligence oversight, and encryption topics:
  - Clipper chip – Encryption device promoted by the NSA in the 1990s
  - ECHELON – Signals intelligence collection and analysis network
  - Foreign Intelligence Surveillance Act – 1978 United States federal law
  - Room 641A – Telecommunication interception facility
- David Grusch UFO whistleblower claims – Former U.S. military intelligence officer's claims about "non-human" spacecraft recovery
