= Matthew T. Mellon =

American literature scholar (1897–1992)

Matthew Taylor Mellon
- Born: July 6, 1897
- Died: June 24, 1992 (aged 94)
- Education: Princeton University
- Occupation: Professor
- Family: Mellon family

Matthew Taylor Mellon (July 6, 1897 — June 24, 1992) was an American scholar, mountaineer, yachtsman, and philanthropist.

A member of the wealthy Mellon family, he was the first Pittsburghian to summit the Matterhorn and the first to cross the Atlantic Ocean on the airship Hindenburg. He lectured at the University of Freiburg for more than a decade, authored the text Early American Views on Slavery, and served on the Colby College board of trustees. He was passionately supportive of the German Nazi Party. He is the namesake and benefactor of the Matthew T. Mellon Foundation.

== Early life and education ==
Matthew Mellon, a scion of the Mellon family, was a son of Gulf Oil co-founder William Larimer Mellon Sr. and was raised in Pittsburgh, Pennsylvania. According to Mellon, during childhood he began an intense admiration for Germany by association with Grimms' Fairy Tales and, later, the works of Richard Wagner, which was kindled by his German governess.

He attended St. Paul's School, but was later transferred to a preparatory military academy by his father due to concerns he was, in Mellon's own words, becoming a "worthless dreamer". Mellon graduated from Princeton University and received a master of arts degree from Harvard University. He later earned a doctorate from Germany's University of Freiburg.

Mellon served in the U.S. Navy during World War I. He was commissioned an ensign and was stationed in London to work as a code clerk. Mellon family chronicler David Koskoff, reporting on the content of Mellon's diaries during this period, writes that he appeared to have spent much of the month he was assigned overseas "attending the theater, opera, and ballet, [and] enjoying London's fine restaurants".

In 1928, he contracted malaria while cruising on his private yacht, Honeydew II, in Louisiana.

== Career ==
After completing his studies at Freiburg, Mellon continued as a lecturer there throughout the 1930s, eschewing the family business to pursue life as an academic.

Mellon's 1934 historical study, Early American Views on Slavery, was credited in a contemporaneous New York Times review as an "interesting and valuable book for the student of American history", while the Buffalo News called it "ably written". In 2018, Jeff Spinner-Halev, political theorist at the University of North Carolina, explained that the book presents a "sympathetic view of Jefferson's views on Blacks".

Following World War II, Mellon served on the board of trustees of Colby College and donated to it the Mellon Memorial Organ.

=== Support for the Nazi Party ===
Mellon was a supporter of the German Nazi Party and, according to Knight Ridder, was an "unabashed Nazi sympathizer", though he personally disavowed being "a Nazi agent". Princeton Alumni Weekly editor Datus Smith referred to Mellon as a "Nazi enthusiast".

During the 1930s, Mellon signaled his "strong approval" of the Nazi Party and "the highest hopes for its ultimate success". He recounted in his diary an emotional experience attending a Wagnerian opera as a guest of Adolf Hitler, though later recalled to Koskoff his exhaustion at the frequency with which he found himself performing the Nazi salute: "we were heil-ing everything. Heil Hitler! Heil Hitler! everywhere. It got to be very tiresome".

On one occasion in 1935, he decorated his berth on a transatlantic voyage with the Reich Flag. The same year, he declared of Hitler that "the German people, with the exception of a few loud-crying minorities who do not matter very much, have the utmost faith in him".

In 1934, Harvard University rejected Mellon's offer to fund a scholarship for a Harvard student "for privileges of study in the New Germany". Mellon's scholarship offer came weeks after an identical one from Adolf Hitler's confidante Ernst Hanfstaengl was rejected by the university on perceptual grounds; Mellon stated his proposed scholarship was intended as a direct replacement for the Hanfstaengl one.

According to Koskoff, Matthew Mellon's political views had not changed significantly by the time he interviewed him in the late 1970s. Barry Paris wrote in 2000 that Mellon's support for the Nazi Party "embarrassed" members of the extended Mellon family.

== Personal life ==
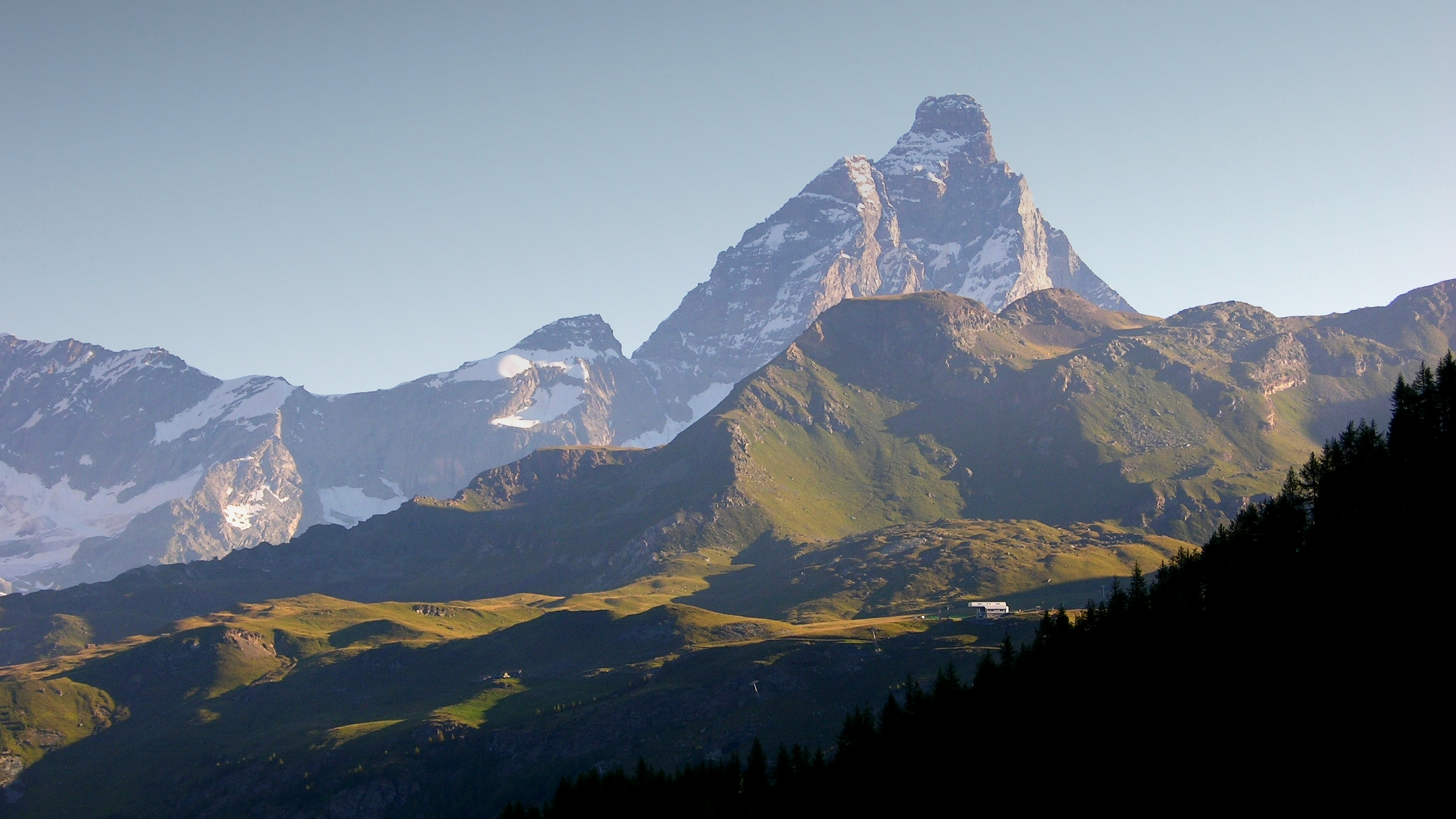
In 1922, Mellon became the first Pittsburghian to summit the Matterhorn (pictured in 2007).

Mellon married Gertrude, a German citizen he met while a student at the University of Freiburg and who was later naturalized American. They later divorced, Gertrude alleging "extreme mental cruelty" as the cause. Matthew and Gertrude raised their children, Karl and James, in a German-speaking, U.S. household. By the time Karl began high school, he spoke almost no English, leading to his bullying.

Matthew's notable descendants include grandsons Christopher Mellon and Matthew Mellon, both via son Karl through different wives.

In 1967 he donated $250,000 for the upkeep of the Mellon family ancestral home in Omagh, Northern Ireland and, the following year, presided over the Mellon family reunion there, during which he led family members in a convoy of Rolls Royce limousines to visit the birthplace of Thomas Mellon. As of 1986, he was dividing his time between homes in Coconut Grove, Florida and Kitzbühel, Austria.

Mellon was a mountaineer and, in 1922, summited the Matterhorn, becoming the first person from Pittsburgh to make the full ascent. In recognition of his climb, he was made an honorary member of the Swiss Alpine Club. In 1936, Mellon became the first person from Pittsburgh to make a transatlantic crossing on the LZ 129 Hindenburg, during which he wore a swastika lapel pin.

== Legacy ==
The Matthew T. Mellon Foundation is a grantmaking nonprofit organization that, as of 2023, held $2.4 million in assets.

== See also ==
- Lawrence Dennis
