= Tamara Mellon =

British fashion entrepreneur (born 1967)

Tamara Mellon OBE
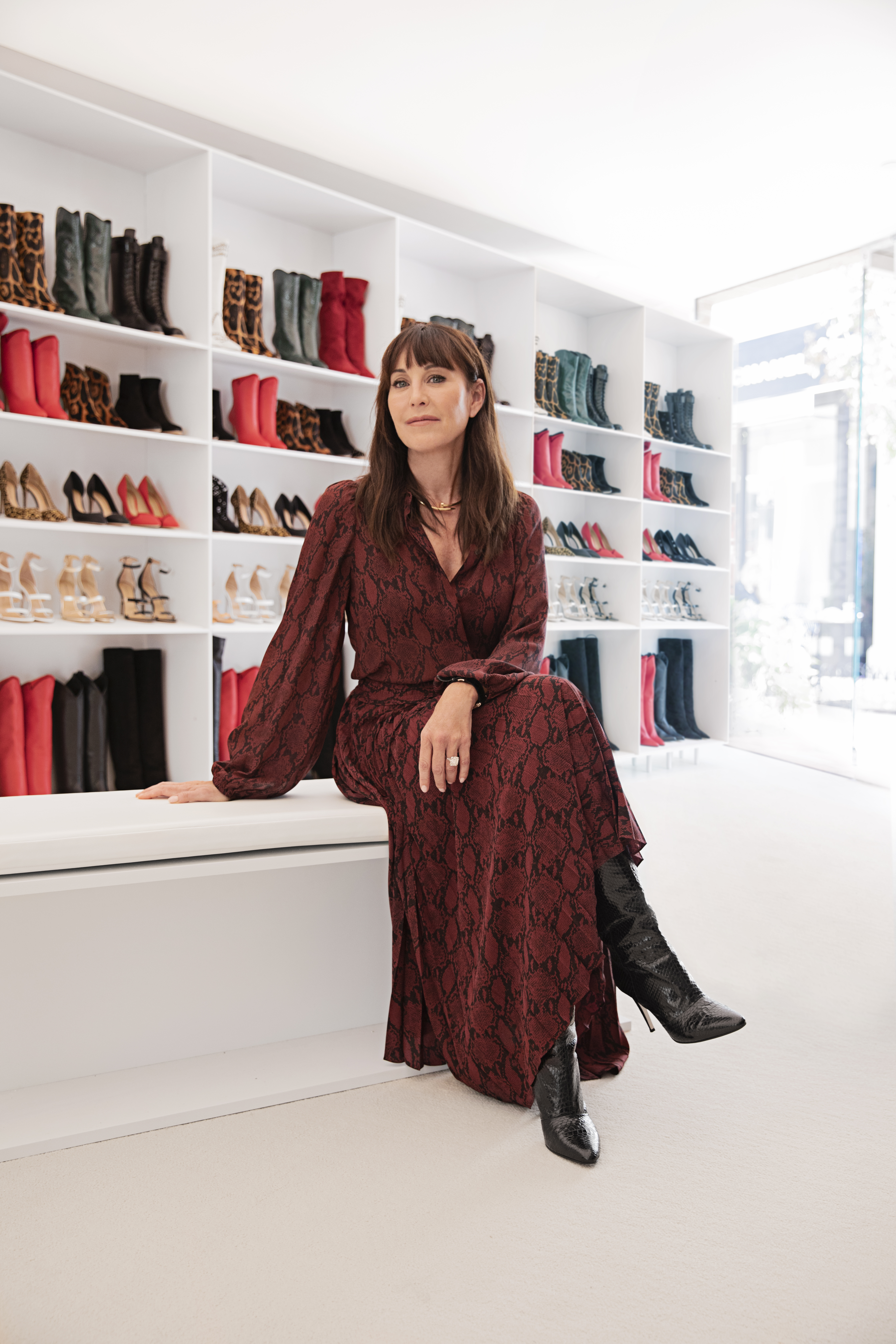
- Mellon in 2018
- Born: Tamara Yeardye; 7 July 1967 (age 59); London, England
- Occupation: Fashion entrepreneur
- Label: Tamara Mellon
- Spouse: Matthew Mellon (div.)
- Partner: Michael Ovitz
- Children: 1
- Website: tamaramellon.com

Tamara Mellon OBE (née Yeardye; born 7 July 1967) is a British fashion entrepreneur who co-founded the luxury footwear brand Jimmy Choo. She founded her namesake luxury footwear brand, Tamara Mellon, with co-founder and CEO Jill Layfield and Tania Spinelli, chief data officer, in 2016.

== Early life ==
Mellon was born Tamara Yeardye in London on 7 July 1967. The eldest of three siblings, she is a daughter of Tom Yeardye, a stunt double for Rock Hudson, and Ann (Davis) Yeardye, a former Chanel model. Her father was business partners with Vidal Sassoon.

In 1976, the family relocated to Beverly Hills, California and lived in a home next door to Nancy Sinatra. She alternated summers between California and the UK. She studied at two independent girls' schools, Berkshire—Marist School and Heathfield St Mary's School before attending finishing school in Switzerland at the now-defunct Institut Alpin Videmanette.

She acquired her current surname from her ex-husband, Matthew Mellon, an American businessman and member of the prominent Mellon family.

== Career ==
Mellon began her career at Phyllis Walters Public Relations, Mirabella; in 1991 she was employed as an accessories editor and assistant to Sarajane Hoare at British Vogue.

Mellon approached bespoke shoe-maker Mr Jimmy Choo with the idea of launching a ready-to-wear shoe firm. As co-founder of the Jimmy Choo company, Mellon secured funding from her father for the creation of her business and she sourced material from factories in Italy. In addition, she set up an office in Italy to handle production, quality control, and shipping. By 2001, the company had over 100 retail clients including Harrods, Harvey Nichols, Saks Fifth Avenue, and Bergdorf Goodman. The collections accounted for over 50% of the production of several of these factories.

The first Jimmy Choo store which is on Motcombe Street in London, was followed by stores in New York, Las Vegas, and Beverly Hills, California. In April 2001, the company partnered with Equinox Luxury Holdings Ltd. and acquired Mr Choo's share of the ready-to-wear business. Equinox's chief executive, Robert Bensoussan, became CEO of Jimmy Choo Ltd, introducing handbag and small leather goods collections.

In November 2004 with the company valued at £101 million, Hicks Muse announced the majority acquisition of Jimmy Choo Ltd. Mellon made an estimated £85 million from the eventual sales of her share of the company in 2011. In 2007, Mellon appeared on the Sunday Times Rich List, where she was ranked as the 751st richest person in the UK, with an estimated wealth of £99 million. She was also ranked as the 64th richest woman in Britain. In 2013, she said that her eponymous luxury shoe brand would not buy from companies which had no female executives.

=== Business difficulties ===
Mellon's shoe and apparel brand filed for bankruptcy protection under Chapter 11 of the bankruptcy code in December 2015. The filing said that the company had assets of between $1 million and $10 million and also 100 to 199 creditors who were owed between $1 million and $10 million. Pursuant to the bankruptcy reorganisation plan, the American private equity firm NEA made a $10 million cash injection into Mellon's business.

In January 2016, Mellon's former backers filed an objection to the restructuring plans under American bankruptcy protection laws, stating that the scheme would allow her, her fiancé, and a fund to gain control of the new company, leaving former financiers with no repayment. The objection had accusations of mismanagement and abuse of the company, including a life coach on the payroll and an expenditure of $100,000 for tickets to the Met Gala in New York. The US Department of Justice also filed a formal objection. The judge hearing the matter denied all objections and the recapitalization plan was consummated in early 2016.

In September 2016, it was revealed that Mellon was suing Jimmy Choo Ltd, alleging that the company had blocked her from using luxury shoemakers in Florence, Italy to produce her own line.

== Public and political activities ==
Mellon is a member of the New Enterprise Council, a group of entrepreneurs which advises the Conservative Party on policies related to business needs. On 9 November 2010, she was named as a "global trade envoy for Britain" by the British government, intended to have a "roving brief" to promote the country's fashion industry overseas.

Mellon has served on the board of directors for Revlon since 2008. She is also a patron of the Elton John AIDS Foundation.

== Honours and awards ==
In the 2010 Birthday Honours, Mellon was appointed as an Officer of the Order of the British Empire (OBE) for services to the fashion industry.

== Personal life ==
She is the daughter of Tommy Yeardye and former Chanel model Ann Davies, who married 15 January 1965. Tamara married Mathew Mellon in 2000. Together, the two had a daughter, Araminta. In 2005, the couple divorced.

Regarding her approach to her wardrobe, Mellon told Vogue magazine in 2004, "I never wear [clothing] from past seasons", adding that, each season, she sends 98 per cent of her wardrobe to a favorite resale store. In January of that year, that amounted to 40 outfits, according to the article. In 2007, Mellon began a romantic relationship with actor Christian Slater that ended two years later.

In 2013, Mellon published the autobiography In My Shoes in which she details her rise to success and her partnership with shoe designer Jimmy Choo. In an interview about the book with Vanity Fair, she spoke of the challenges of designing shoes for the Oscar Season. Several media publications reported on the discussion in her book about her drug-addiction issues, specifically her problems with cocaine. Subsequent news coverage also focused on her stint in rehab, party lifestyle and being fired from Vogue magazine. Mellon's battle with alcohol addiction is also well documented and she met her first husband, Matthew, at Alcoholics Anonymous. They later divorced and she wrote a number of articles about the dramatic details of her marriage, referencing "snorting her way through alpine ranges of cocaine".

In 2015, she announced her engagement to Michael Ovitz in a magazine interview with HELLO! In a 2016 The Sunday Times article, she referred to the situation as "complicated". A 2025 article in The New York Times referred to her as Ovitz's fiancée, and said she has lived with Ovitz in his house in Beverly Hills "for the past 15 years".

== Books ==
- Mellon, Tamara; William Patrick (2013). In My Shoes: A Memoir. New York: PortfolioPenguin. ISBN 9781591846161. OCLC 855783504.
