= Karl Negley Mellon =

American heir (1937–1983)

- Born: August 5, 1937; Pittsburgh, Pennsylvania, United States
- Died: March 31, 1983 (aged 45); Maine, United States
- Occupations: Trucker, Fisherman
- Spouses: Ann; Anne Paul Stokes (1962-1969); Bonnie
- Children: 4 (including Christopher Mellon and Matthew Taylor Mellon)
- Father: Matthew T. Mellon
- Family: Mellon family

Karl Negley Mellon (August 5, 1937 – March 31, 1983) was an American heir and the son of Matthew T. Mellon. A member of the Mellon family, he experienced difficulties during his life before dying by suicide at age 45. The disposition of his estate—incorrectly rumored to be worth a fortune—was the subject of media attention.

== Early life and education ==
Karl Negley Mellon was the first son of Matthew T. and Gertrude Mellon. He was raised by them in the United States speaking German (Note: Gertrude Mellon was a German-born, naturalized American citizen while Matthew T. Mellon spent much of the 1930s living in Germany, where he was interested in Nazism.) so that, by the time he began high school, he knew almost no English. This led to his bullying by classmates.

Matthew and Gertrude divorced in 1951 in Reno, Nevada. Gertrude took custody of Karl and his brother, James Ross Mellon, whom she raised in Manhattan. Karl was eventually expelled from the Choate School for Boys.

Karl's brother, James Ross Mellon, reported that while Matthew "adored" him (James) he did not get along well with Karl. According to Burton Hersh, Karl suffered "bouts of periodic derangement". He was institutionalized and ultimately confined to a secure psychiatric facility.

== Marriages ==
Karl married several times, James once noting that "every time I returned from Africa I had another sister-in-law".

He met his first wife, Ann, while the two were both under psychiatric commitment at the Menninger Clinic. Karl escaped the Menninger Clinic and eloped with Ann. Together, they had two children, including Christopher Mellon. Karl soon divorced Ann. Karl's children with Ann were estranged from him and raised in inner city Chicago in circumstances son Christopher later described as "difficult".

In 1962, Karl remarried, wedding the Drexel family heiress Anne Paul Stokes. With Anne he had additional children, including son Matthew Mellon who, like his father, struggled with bipolar disorder. Karl also abandoned this second family. He and Anne were subsequently divorced—Anne alleged "cruel and abusive treatment" and was granted sole custody of the couple's children.

He was shot and slightly wounded in 1975 over what was reported to be a dispute involving a romantic entanglement over the same woman with whom he and the assailant were purportedly both engaged. Karl later married the woman at the center of that dispute, Yvonne "Bonnie"—a working class woman from Maine—though the two eventually separated.

== Career ==
He worked as a fishing boat operator and truck driver.

== Death and estate ==
According to Mellon family chronicler David Koskoff, on Karl Mellon's 21st birthday in 1958, when he attained access to his trust fund—valued at $1.2 million—he took an empty suitcase to Mellon Bank and ordered a teller to "fill 'er up".

He committed suicide near his home in Maine by carbon monoxide poisoning in 1983. His will divided his assets among his four children, but controversy ensued over handwritten codicils that directed his estate be instead divided among several friends and a woman he met at a bar a few weeks earlier. The probate of the will was the subject of several stories in the Bangor Daily News, the Ellsworth American, and the Pittsburgh Post-Gazette, with the latter newspaper reporting that "half of the residents of Desert Island, Maine are convinced they are millionaires since the body of Karl N. Mellon, 45, was found in a parked car on the outskirts of Bar Harbor".

The dispute between the two groups of beneficiaries was ultimately settled with those named in the codicils agreeing to drop their claim to Mellon's estate in exchange for a cash payment equal to a percentage of it. Despite rumors of a fortune held by Mellon, according to his personal representative, the estate was ultimately valued at less than $100,000 and consisted of Mellon's house, his car, and a truck.
