= Sarajane Hoare =

British fashion journalist, director, and stylist

Sarajane Hoare is a British fashion journalist, director, and stylist who, since the 1980s has worked for British Vogue, Vanity Fair, and Harper's Bazaar. She has been instrumental in developing the career of photographer Herb Ritts, shoe designer Tamara Mellon, and journalist Kate Phelan.

== Early life and education ==
Hoare is British by birth. She studied at the Chelsea College of Arts, London.

== Career ==
Hoare has worked as a fashion director for The Observer, British Vogue, and Glamour; and as an editor-at-large for Harper's Bazaar and contributing editor to Vanity Fair. In 2010 she was invited to join Town & Country as a guest fashion director for the 2011 Spring issue.

Vogue has described her as a "safari enthusiast", and the Financial Times has described her work as "safari imagery". She is credited with discovering the fashion photographer Herb Ritts, with whom she worked for seventeen years. Another fashion photographer, Mario Testino, cited Hoare and other editors as instrumental in making his career. In 1991 Hoare took on the young Tamara Mellon (co-founder of Jimmy Choo) as an assistant, commenting later that Mellon's eye for a quality shoe had been obvious even then.

As editor and representative of Vanity Fair, Hoare was approached by the Fashion Museum, Bath and asked to select the defining look of 2004 for their Dress of the Year collection. She chose a long evening gown by Tom Ford for Yves Saint Laurent in a Chinese dragon-printed silk, which had been worn on the red carpet by Nicole Kidman to that year's Tony Awards.

Hoare published her first book, Talking Fashion, in 2002, a monograph on the fashion industry.
