= KeySpan =

American natural gas company

KeySpan Corporation
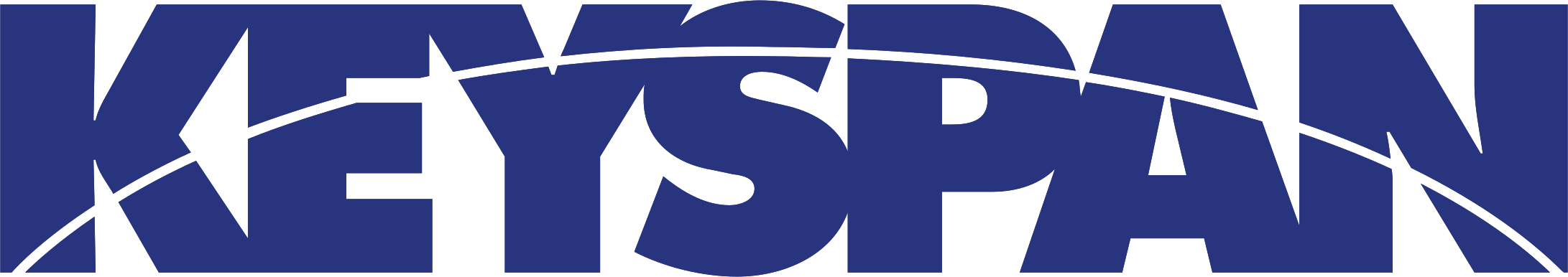
- Type: Public
- Traded as: NYSE: KSE
- Founded: 1998; 28 years ago
- Defunct: 2007
- Fate: Purchased by NationalGrid
- Successor: National Grid USA
- Headquarters: One MetroTech Center, Brooklyn, New York, United States of America
- Products: Natural gas utility on Long Island and in Brooklyn and Queens Counties; parts of Massachusetts and New Hampshire.
- Parent: National Grid USA

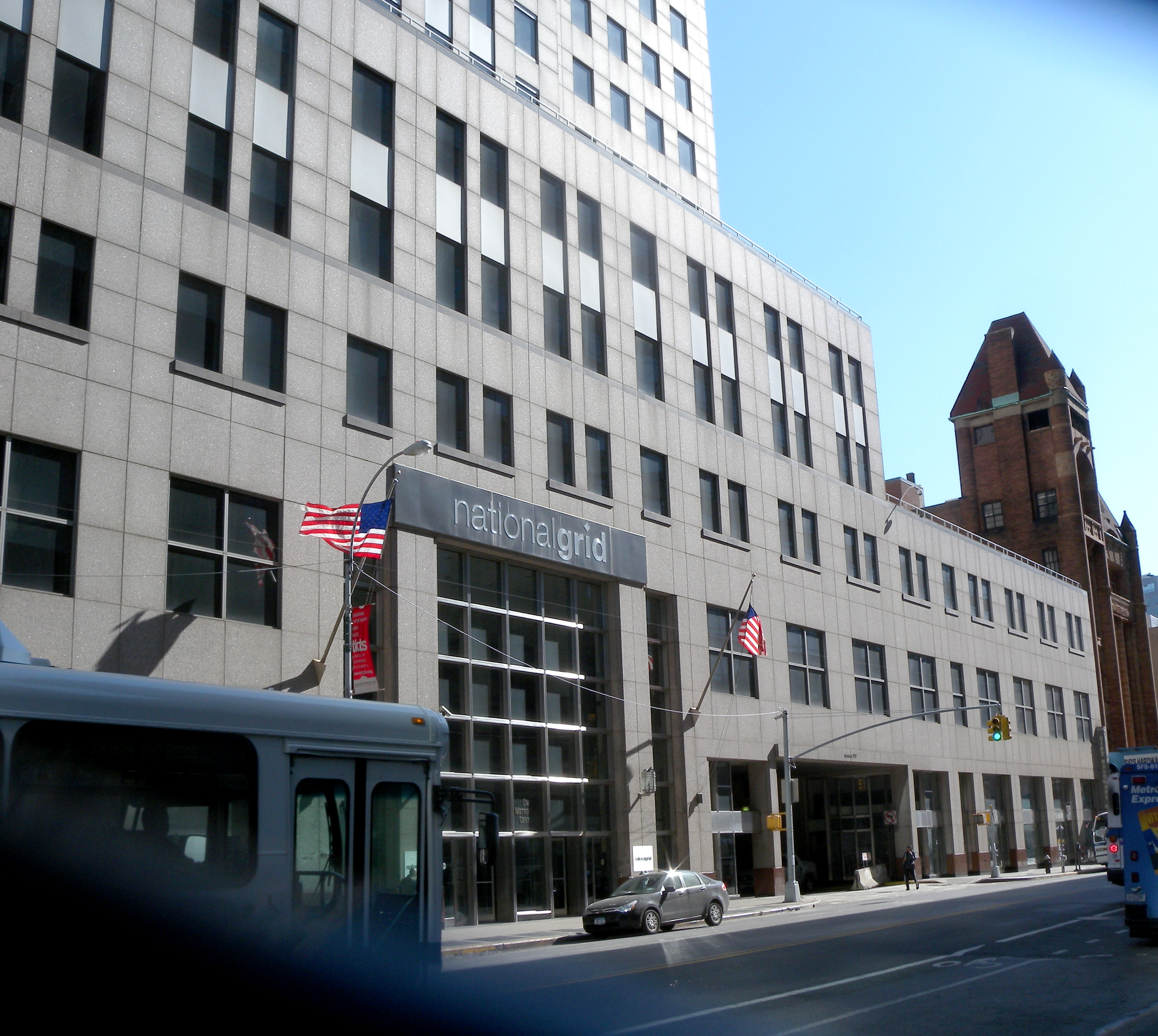
Brooklyn headquarters

KeySpan Corporation was the fifth largest distributor of natural gas in the United States. KeySpan was formed in 1998 as a result of the merger of Brooklyn Union Gas Company (founded 1895 by merging several smaller companies) and Long Island Lighting Company (LILCO), and briefly operated under the name MarketSpan following the merger. On November 8, 2000, KeySpan acquired Eastern Enterprises, Eastern's natural gas distribution subsidiaries including Boston Gas Company, Colonial Gas Company and Essex Gas Company; Eastern's unregulated businesses including ServicEdge Partners, the largest unregulated provider of residential HVAC equipment installation and services in Massachusetts; and EnergyNorth Natural Gas in New Hampshire. It also was the operator of the Long Island Power Authority's electrical grid, which had previously been part of LILCO before LIPA took it over in 1998. KeySpan had its headquarters in Brooklyn, New York, USA and employed 9,700 people.

In February 2006, National Grid USA, a wholly owned subsidiary of National Grid plc of the United Kingdom, announced that it had agreed to buy KeySpan for $7.3 billion (£4.1 billion) in cash, the deal being subject to regulatory approval and endorsement by the shareholders of the two companies. In 2007 National Grid plc announced the completion of the acquisition.

KeySpan received a 100% rating on the Corporate Equality Index released by the Human Rights Campaign starting in 2004, the third year of the report.

== Brooklyn Union Gas ==
The Brooklyn Union Gas Company was originally established in 1825 as the Brooklyn Gas Light Company, changing its name after a series of mergers in 1895. Rapid growth in the early 1900s prompted the company to establish a new headquarters at 180 Remsen Street. Noted Brooklyn architect Frank Freeman was commissioned to design the new headquarters, which was built in 1914. In 1962, a new 13-story headquarters was built at 195 Montague Street. The headquarters was relocated to One MetroTech Center circa 1990.

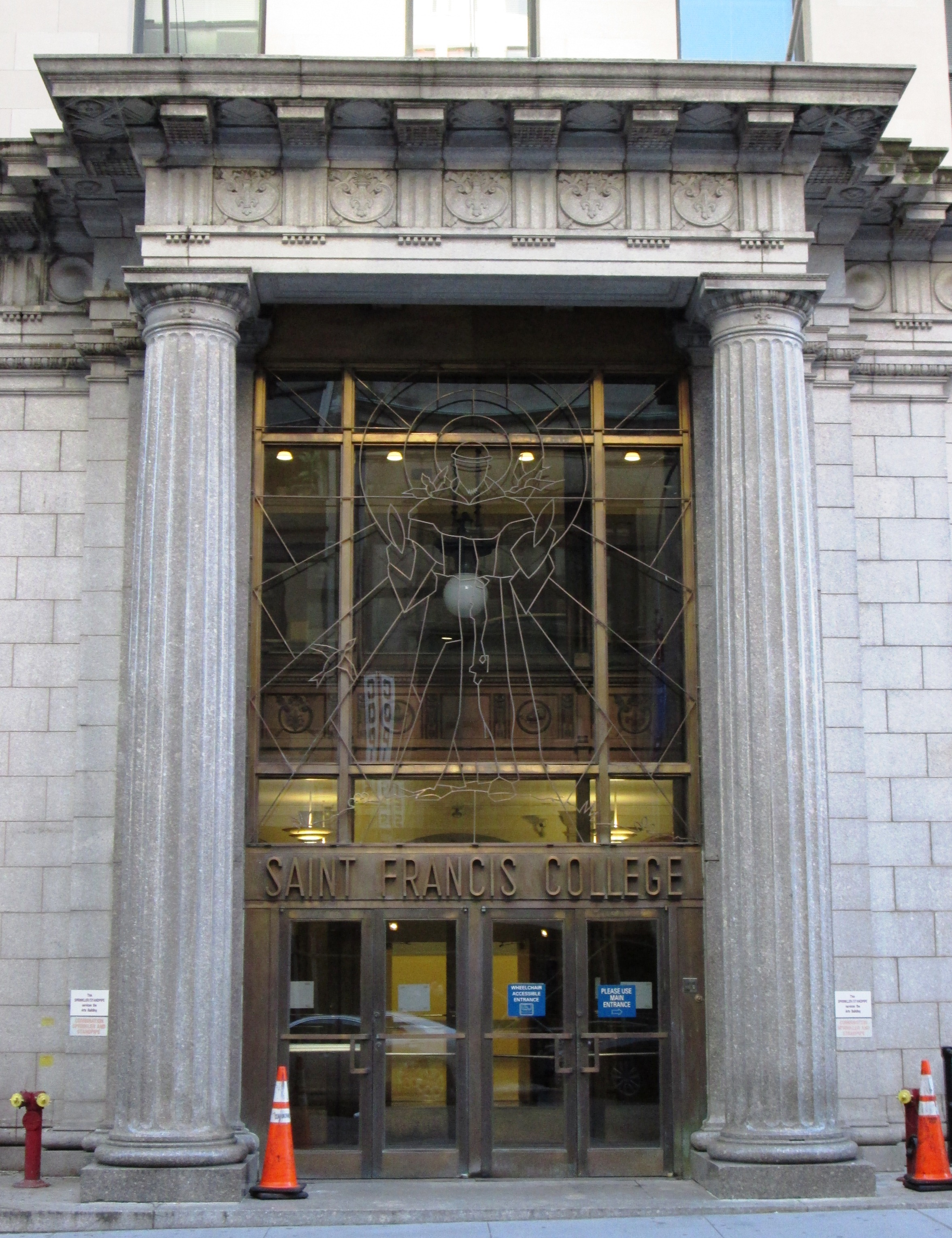
The entrance to the Brooklyn Union Gas Company Headquarters building in 2013

At some point it had 3,651 Employees and nearly $1 billion in sales.

== See also ==
- KeySpan Park
