= Kate Phelan =

British fashion journalist and stylist

Kate Phelan (born 1964) is a British fashion journalist and stylist. She is currently the creative director of Harvey Nichols.

== Biography ==
Phelan grew up in Exeter, and studied fashion at Somerset College of Arts and Technology. She then went on to study fashion communications at Central Saint Martins from 1984. In 1987 she took on a three-month internship with Sarajane Hoare at British Vogue which ultimately led to full-time employment as a fashion assistant. In 1990, she left Vogue after three years to join Marie Claire as a senior fashion editor, but was asked back to British Vogue in 1993 by its new editor, Alexandra Shulman. Until 2011, Phelan worked as a senior fashion director for Vogue, commissioning and directing some of the magazine's strongest photoshoots from the 1990s and 2000s. Her favoured photographers included Paolo Roversi, Nick Knight, Tim Walker and Corinne Day.

In June 2011, Phelan again left Vogue and joined Topshop as their creative director. In 2013, she was asked to come back to Vogue in a part-time capacity. In 2017 her job title at Vogue was senior contributing fashion editor.

In 2017 Phelan was the fashion journalist selected to choose a defining look of 2016 for the Fashion Museum, Bath's Dress of the Year collection. She chose two male and female ensembles by JW Anderson, a designer who had previously caught her attention in 2012 when he was awarded Topshop sponsorship for his Spring-Summer 2013 collection.

She was appointed creative director of Harvey Nichols in 2024.
