= Rachel Mellon Walton =

American philanthropist (1899–2006)

- Born: Rachel Larimer Mellon; January 8, 1899; Pittsburgh, Pennsylvania, U.S.
- Died: March 2, 2006 (aged 107); Pittsburgh, Pennsylvania, U.S.
- Occupation: Philanthropist
- Known for: Distinguished Daughter of Pennsylvania (1998); Centenarian and philanthropist who was the longest serving member of the Pittsburgh Symphony Orchestra's board of directors and a major funder of the Albert Schweitzer Hospital in Deschapelles, Haiti
- Spouse: John F. Walton Jr. (m. March 30, 1922)
- Parent(s): William Larimer Mellon Sr. and Mary (Taylor) Mellon

Rachel Larimer Mellon Walton (January 8, 1899 – March 2, 2006) was an American philanthropist, a member of one of the most prominent families in Pittsburgh, Pennsylvania, and the longest serving member of the Pittsburgh Symphony Orchestra's board of directors.

In 1998, she was named one of the Distinguished Daughters of Pennsylvania.

A centenarian at the time of her death in 2006, she reached the age of 107.

== Formative years and family ==
Born on January 8, 1899, in Pittsburgh, Pennsylvania, as Rachel Larimer Mellon, Rachel Mellon was one of four children of William Larimer Mellon (1868–1949) and Mary "May" (Taylor) Mellon. Her father, a founder of Gulf Oil, was a member of the prominent Mellon family.

Educated at the Dobbs Ferry School in Dobbs Ferry, New York, as her mother had been before her, Rachel Mellon was reared with her siblings, Margaret, Matthew T., and William Larimer Mellon Jr., in Pittsburgh's East End. During the early 1900s, she and her parents and siblings traveled frequently to the Miami, Florida, area, where the family's yacht, the Vagabondia, was often anchored.

Engaged to be married in November 1921, Rachel Mellon wed John Fawcett Walton Jr. (1893–1974) on March 30, 1922. They raised four children together at their home in Pittsburgh's East End.

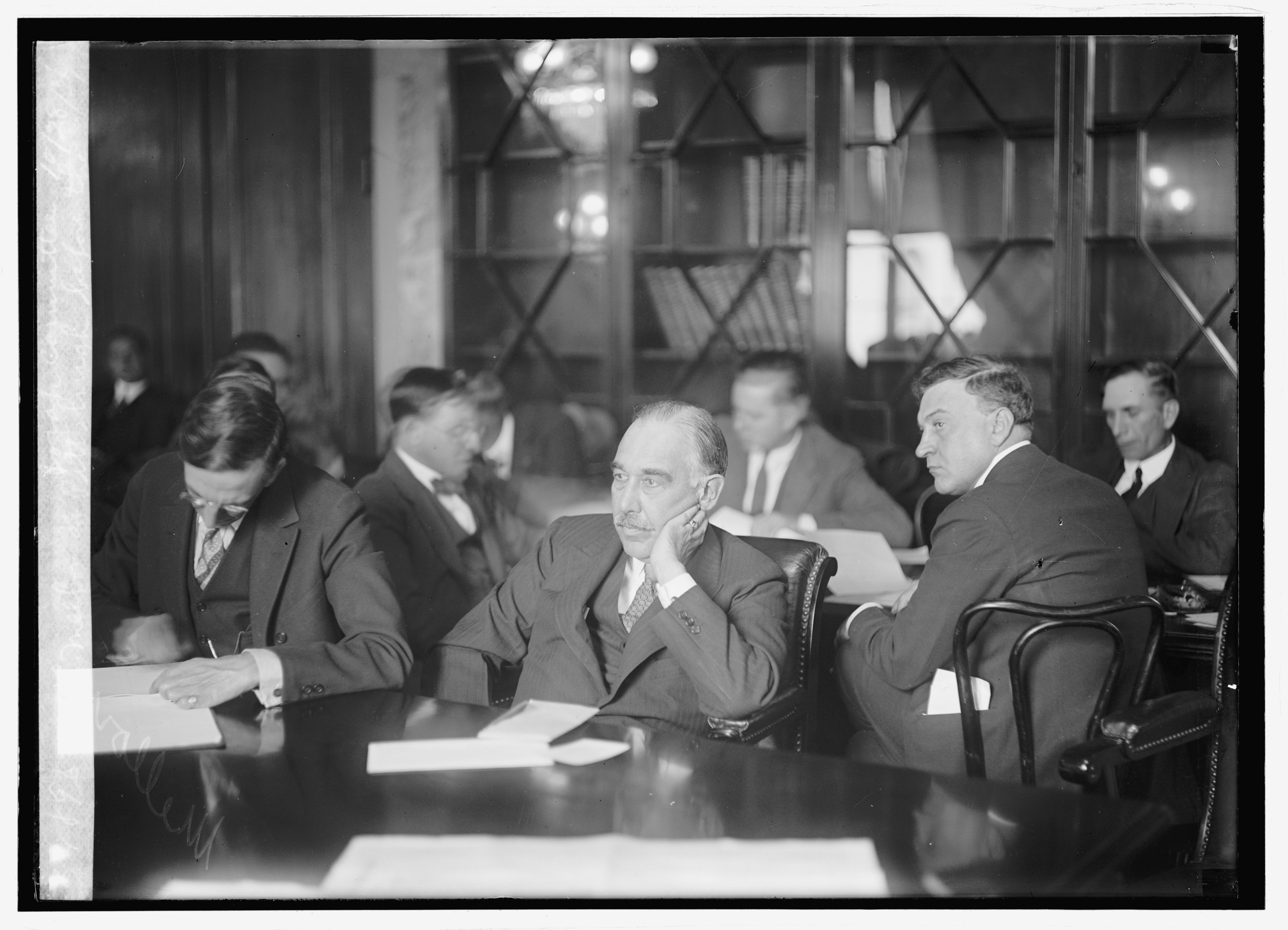
Rachel Mellon Walton's father, William L. Mellon Sr., during his appearance before the United States Senate's Borah Committee, October 1924

During the fall of 1924, her family was in the news frequently as her father testified during United States Senate hearings about potential political corruption. Known at the time as the Borah Committee hearings, the sessions were held to investigate expenditures of more than $3,451,000 that had allegedly been made by the Republican Party to influence voter opinions regarding various issues being debated at the federal level.

When her grandfather, James Ross Mellon, died in 1934, Walton was given a $1,000 bequest by his estate.

On March 18, 1942, Walton's mother died in Miami, Florida. She and her siblings and other relatives were subsequently mentioned in multiple newspapers across the United States in death reports about their mother and in reports of the probate of their mother's estate. According to The Indianapolis Star, "After payment of various bequests, the remainder of the estate [was] placed in trust to be divided equally among Mrs. Mellon's grandchildren." The report went on to state that "Jewelry and personal effects were given to Mrs. Mellon's two daughters, Mrs. Rachel Mellon Walton and Mrs. Margaret Mellon Hitchcock.... A brother, Matthew Taylor of Westfield, N.Y., was given $30,000; a nephew, Roy Taylor, Brooklyn, $25,000; a niece, Mrs. Scott Sterns, Longmeadow, Mass., $40,000."

On October 9, 1949, Walton's father died at his home in Pittsburgh. She and her three siblings were mentioned, once again, in multiple newspapers across the United States, this time in death reports about their father and in reports of the probate of his multi-million-dollar estate, which was ultimately divided between Walton and her siblings. In addition to ensuring that trust funds would be set up for each of his children in equal amounts after the payment of estate taxes, Mellon directed that $100,000 be given to Rachel Walton's husband, John, and also arranged for $75,000 to be distributed among staff who were employed personally by him at the time of his death. By the time that her father's $23,186,736 estate was finally settled during the summer of 1954, Walton and her siblings were awarded just $246,317 each because the estate's final value had been reduced to $6,149,922 net, following the payment of taxes and estate administration costs.

== Philanthropic efforts and legacy ==
On December 23, 1970, Walton established the Rachel Mellon Walton Fund at The Pittsburgh Foundation. In 1971, she donated $64,750 to the fund. Foundation officials presently estimate that "her giving will continue in perpetuity." Organizations and projects supported by her fund include:

- Carnegie Institute of Technology (Biophysical research laboratory of Jerome Wolken, PhD)
- Pittsburgh Cultural Trust's Campaign for a Dynamic Downtown
- Pittsburgh History and Landmarks Foundation restoration of Pittsburgh's old North Side Post Office (1969)
- Pittsburgh Symphony Endowment Fund

In addition, as a major benefactor to the arts, education, medicine, music, nature conservation, and the welfare of women, Walton provided key financial support for the Albert Schweitzer Hospital, founded by her brother, Dr. William Larimer Mellon Jr., in Deschapelles, Haiti, as well as the Walton Hall of Ancient Egypt at the Carnegie Museums of Pittsburgh, the Carnegie Mellon Tepper School of Business, and the Women's Center & Shelter of Greater Pittsburgh. In the 1970s, Walton donated land to the Western Pennsylvania Conservancy for the Beechwood Farms Nature Reserve.

Named one of the Distinguished Daughters of Pennsylvania in 1998, she and six other women were presented with medals and citations for distinguished service to the Commonwealth of Pennsylvania by Pennsylvania Governor Tom Ridge in a special ceremony held at the governor's residence in Harrisburg.

== Deaths and interments ==
Walton was preceded in death by her husband, John F. Walton Jr., who died at home in Pittsburgh on November 14, 1974. His funeral service was held at the Shadyside Presbyterian Church in Pittsburgh.

Rachel Mellon Walton, who survived her husband by more than three decades, continued to remain active with her philanthropic work even after becoming a centenarian. She died at the age of 107 in her Oakland, Pennsylvania home on March 2, 2006, and was interred at Allegheny Cemetery in Pittsburgh.

Walton's eldest son, John F. Walton III, died on February 2, 2007, in Phoenix, Arizona. Mr. Walton moved West in 1950 and purchased a cattle ranch in Kirkland, Arizona, where he resided until 1974.

Walton's daughter, Anne Farley (Walton) Whetzel (1923–2019), who had joined with her mother in donating ninety acres in Fox Chapel to the Western Pennsylvania Conservancy in 1977 in order to establish the Beechwood Farms Nature Reserve, died on January 26, 2019.

Walton's son, James Mellon Walton (1930–2022), who became president of the Carnegie Institute and Carnegie Library on January 1, 1968 and had also been a member of the Vira I. Heinz Endowment's board of trustees for thirty-seven years when he retired in 2020, died from Parkinson's disease on January 2, 2022.

Walton's daughter, Mary Taylor (Walton) Curley (1924–2022), who was the wife of Walter Curley, a former United States Ambassador to Ireland, died on March 22, 2022.
