= Beechwood Farms Nature Reserve =

Nature reserve in Pennsylvania

Coordinates: 40.5431°N 79.9052°W

Beechwood Farms Nature Reserve is a 134-acre (0.5 km^{2}) protected area for flora, fauna, and wildlife in Fox Chapel, Pennsylvania, a Pittsburgh suburb. The site has served as the headquarters of the Audubon Society of Western Pennsylvania (ASWP) since 1977.

The Western Pennsylvania Conservancy owns the land on which Beechwood Farms is located, and leases the site to the ASWP. The nature reserve comprises woodlands, fields, streams, and a pond. It also features more than 5 miles (8.0 km) of walking trails—open from dawn to dusk every day year-round, some of which are accessible for individuals with special needs.

== Audubon Society at Beechwood ==
Audubon facilities at Beechwood Farms now include classrooms, a teacher resource center, a natural history library, the Audubon Nature Store, and the Evans Nature Center auditorium. When built in the 1980s, the education building made use of green building techniques, including natural light and heat conserving mechanisms, and composting toilets.

The history of Audubon at Beechwood began when Rachel Mellon Walton, along with her daughter, Farley Walton Whetzel, acquired the former Flinn estate. In the 1970s the two women donated the land to the Western Pennsylvania Conservancy, which selected the Audubon Society to be the stewards of the reserve.

The Flinn estate dates back to 1903. After his retirement from politics, William Flinn (1851–1924), a prominent Pittsburgh businessman and politician, bought the property, which then occupied more than 350 acres (1.4 km^{2}) on both sides of Dorseyville Road. He established himself there as a gentleman farmer and called it "Beechwood Farms". It was best known for its herd of registered Guernsey cattle, which provided dairy products to the local area.

Today, Beechwood Farms is located in the suburb of Fox Chapel, north of Pittsburgh. It is one of two nature reserves operated by the ASWP; the other is Todd Nature Reserve, located 22 miles from Beechwood Farms in Sarver.
