= Brooklyn Union Gas Company Headquarters =

Historic building in Brooklyn, New York

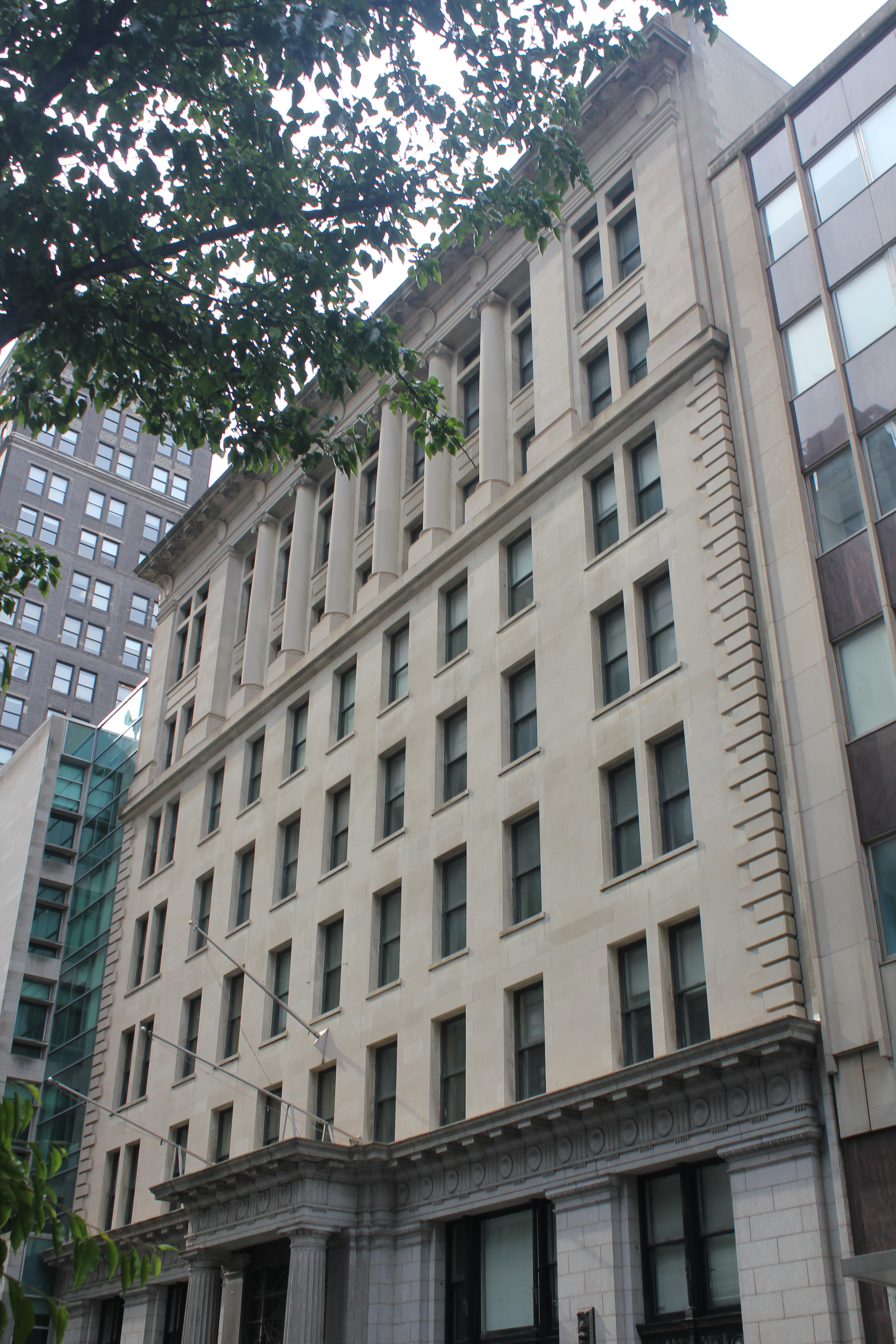
- Interactive map of the Brooklyn Union Gas Company Headquarters area

General information
- Architectural style: Neoclassical
- Location: 176 Remsen Street, Brooklyn, New York, United States
- Coordinates: 40.6932°N 73.9918°W
- Completed: 1914
- Client: Brooklyn Union Gas Company

Design and construction
- Architect: Frank Freeman
- Structural engineer: George A. Fuller Company

The Brooklyn Union Gas Company Headquarters, also known as 176 Remsen Street, is a historic building in Brooklyn Heights, Brooklyn, New York City. Designed by Brooklyn architect Frank Freeman in the neoclassical style, it was completed in 1914 as the headquarters of the Brooklyn Union Gas Company (later KeySpan). The structure was part of the St. Francis College campus from 1963 to 2022.

The facade is eight stories high and is horizontally divided by cornices into three sections. The first two stories, constructed of granite, are vertically divided into five bays; they feature a large central portico with Doric columns. The third through eighth stories are clad with limestone and are divided vertically into 11 bays. There is a colonnade with six Ionic columns on the top two stories. The building was constructed with about 6,775 ft^{2} (629.4 m^{2}) on each floor. When 176 Remsen Street opened, the ground floor had a large public office and exhibition spaces, while the second through seventh stories accommodated Brooklyn Union Gas offices. By the 1960s, these had been converted into academic facilities.

The predecessor to the Brooklyn Union Gas Company was established in 1825 and built a headquarters at 180 Remsen Street in 1856. Rapid growth in the early 1900s prompted the company to acquire land in 1912 for an expanded headquarters at 172–178 Remsen Street. The building was finished in 1914, and the gas company remained there for 47 years. St. Francis College agreed to buy the building in 1960 as part of an expansion of its campus, and the college reopened the building on February 1, 1963, following an extensive renovation. The New York City Landmarks Preservation Commission designated the building as a city landmark in 2011. St. Francis College relocated from the building in 2022 and sold it in April 2023 to Rockrose Development Corporation.

== Site ==
The Brooklyn Union Gas Company Building is located at 176 Remsen Street in the Brooklyn Heights neighborhood of Brooklyn in New York City. It occupies a rectangular land lot on the south side of Remsen Street, between Clinton Street to the west and Court Street to the east. Nearby buildings include the Brooklyn Trust Company Building, 181 Montague Street, and 185 Montague Street to the north; the Montague–Court Building to the northwest; Brooklyn Borough Hall to the east; and 75 Livingston Street to the south.

The site originally measured about 98 feet (30 m) wide and 92 ft (28 m) deep. The modern-day building is part of a larger land lot measuring 300 ft (91 m) wide and 100 ft (30 m) deep, with an area of 29,814 ft^{2} (2,769.8 m^{2}). The buildings are set back 8 feet (2.4 m) from the sidewalk; this gives the sidewalk a total width of 14 feet (4.3 m), much wider than other sidewalks in the neighborhood. This setback exists because of a restrictive covenant placed by Hezekiah Pierrepont, who owned the site in the 19th century, back when the neighborhood was filled with townhouses.

== Architecture ==
The building was designed by Frank Freeman, a prolific Brooklyn architect, for the Brooklyn Union Gas Company (now KeySpan). Although Freeman is known for his work in the Richardsonian Romanesque style, the Brooklyn Union Gas Company Building was completed during his later, Neoclassical period, and is more restrained than his earlier work. The George A. Fuller Company was the general contractor for the building. Numerous contractors provided materials for the building as well, including cut-stone supplier John R. Smith's Son Inc. and brick supplier Hay Walker Brick Co.

=== Facade ===
The eight-story facade is generally constructed of granite on the lowest two stories and limestone above. The building is divided into three sections: a base, shaft, and capital. The two-story base is divided vertically into five bays. The third through sixth floors comprise the shaft, and the seventh and eighth floors constitute the capital; they are divided into 11 bays. The windows originally were hollow-bronze sash windows with bronze trim and wire glass panes. Much of the ornamentation, including spandrel panels with torches and oil lamps, were intended to signify the building's original purpose.

The entrance is through a shallow portico in the center bay, supported on two Roman Doric columns, The upper half of the portico retains its original bronze decorations, as well as a glass globe hanging from the ceiling behind the spandrel panels; a pair of flagpoles hangs above the portico. Anodized-aluminum doorways, which replaced the original doors, flank the lower half of the portico. There are two bays on either side of the entrance. These bays retain their original design, which consists of bronze-framed display windows on both the ground and second floors, with decorative spandrels above the ground-story windows. The piers between each window formerly contained large glass globes. Two recessed areaways, one on either side of the portico, run in front of the windows, with stairways descending to the basement. Above the second floor is a heavy cornice with modillions, running the width of the building.

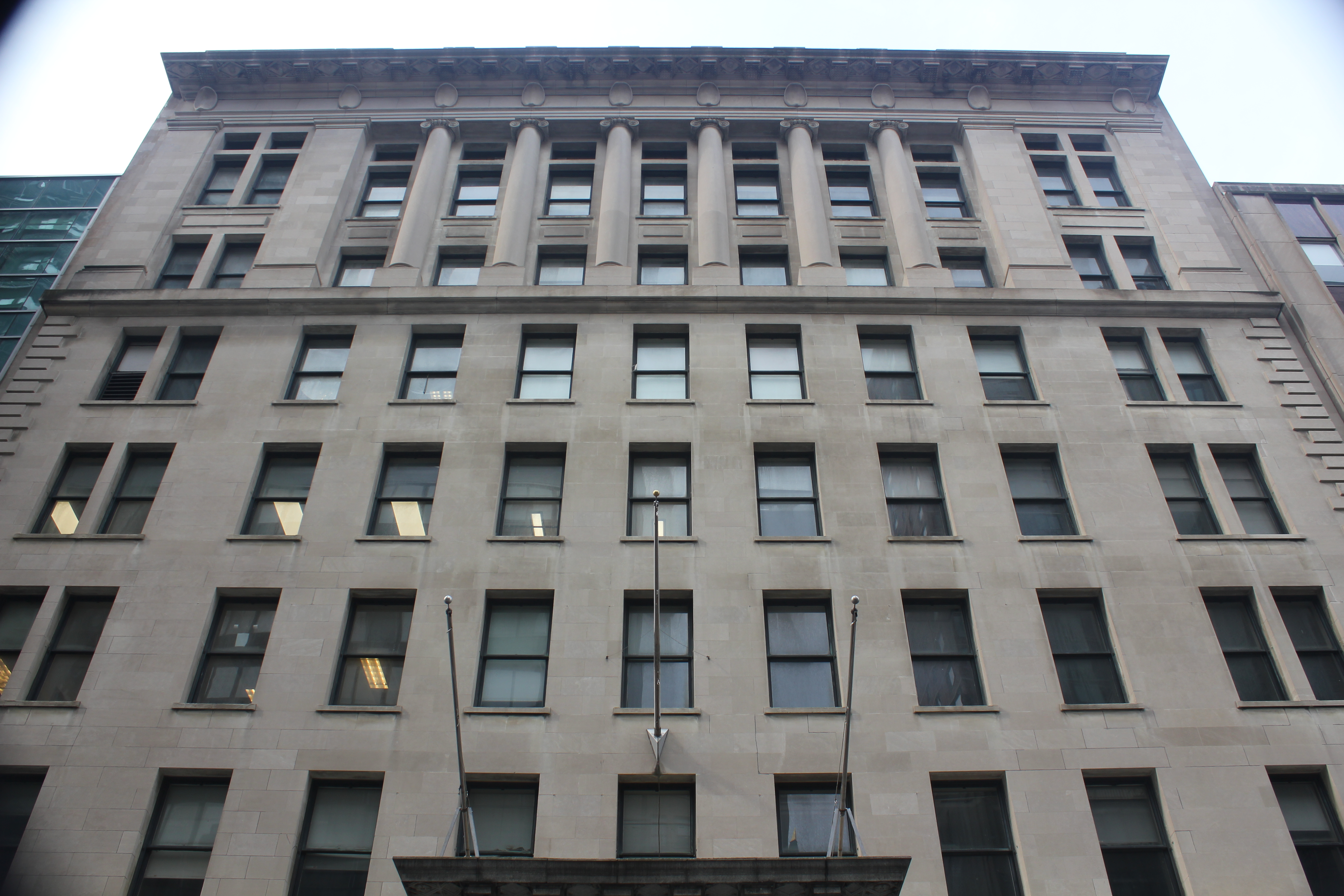
Limestone facade on the third to eighth stories

On the third through sixth floors, quoins mark the extreme west and east ends of the facade. The outermost two bays on either end are grouped together, while the remaining seven bays are spaced apart at regular intervals. The windows are one-over-one sash windows. The sixth floor is surmounted by a plain cornice. On the seventh and eighth floors, the center seven bays are spaced by a series of six engaged Ionic columns rising to an entablature. The outermost two bays on either end are grouped together and are flanked by large pilasters. Above the windows on the eighth story are transom windows. Above the eight-story windows, a heavy stone cornice runs across the entire width of the building. There is a parapet above the cornice. The western and eastern walls, which are partially visible from the street, are largely clad in red brick, except at the corners where there are quoins.

=== Interior ===
176 Remsen Street was built with about 6,775 ft^{2} (629.4 m^{2}) on each floor, which gave the building a total floor area of 47,400 ft^{2} (4,400 m^{2}). The building has a light court above the first floor, which allowed each office to be illuminated by natural light. When the building was completed, it had two elevators with space for a third, as well as two stairways near the front of the building, which were separated from the rest of the structure by hollow steel doors and trim. There was a "fire tower" to the east, which could be accessed from each story.

When the building was completed, it contained multiple mechanical systems. Most of the building was heated directly by radiators, but an indirect heating system was used in the main office. Two ventilation systems were used: the first floor and basement were ventilated by fans in the basement, while the upper stories were ventilated by a fan on the eighth story. Water from the New York City water supply system was pumped to a rooftop tank that supplied all the building's sinks and drinking fountains, while toilets and emergency standpipes received their water from artesian wells. The building also had a 5,000-U.S.-gallon (19,000 L; 4,200 imp gal) water tower. Gas lighting was used throughout the structure, and ducts carried water, air, steam, and gas throughout the building.

==== Original use ====
When 176 Remsen Street opened, the entrance vestibule led to a corridor leading to the elevators, with two stairways at either end. To the right of the entrance were the offices of the manager of the commercial or gas appliances department. To the left of the entrance were display rooms, and at the end of the corridor was an entrance into the old building at 180 Remsen Street. Immediately opposite the entrance, through an arch, was the public office, a room with a high ceiling and a central, elliptical-domed skylight. The public room's counters, column bases, and pilasters were made of polished gray marble, while the walls and ceiling were of Caen stone. The room also had several marble tables and benches; bronze and glass counter screens. There was a balcony with several rooms and with a pair of three-story-high vaults for book and record storage. The mezzanine contained the offices of the purchasing department and a photometer room. The company's original headquarters, at 180 Remsen Street, housed showroom space and a mezzanine with a living room, dining room, and library. The second floor of the original building also had a small office, as well as a 200-seat auditorium with a model kitchen.

Brooklyn Union Gas offices occupied the second through seventh stories. When the building was opened in 1914, the second and fourth stories were unoccupied, while the third floor housed the company's distribution department and street department. The fifth floor had a claim department, an addressograph department, a telephone room, and offices for the chief engineer and gas-manufacturing engineer. The sixth floor had executive offices for the treasurer, secretary, assistant secretary, and auditor, which were decorated in a utilitarian manner; this floor also had space for the auditing department and the New York Public Service Commission. The seventh floor had a 15-foot (4.6 m) ceiling and contained the drafting room, construction department, construction engineer's offices, and an auditorium. Blueprints and plans were stored on a mezzanine above the seventh floor, which was connected via a dumbwaiter to a blueprint room in the penthouse.

==== Use as college campus ====
176 Remsen Street became part of St. Francis College campus in 1963. As part of the renovation, a chapel and an auditorium with up to 200 seats were added. In addition, the building contained the college's departmental and administrative offices, music and visual-aid rooms, four conference rooms, and 12 seminar rooms. (Note: The Tablet gives different figures for the auditorium's capacity (150 seats) and the number of seminar rooms (seven).) One of the conference rooms at 176 Remsen Street had space for up to 80 seats. The building was also variously cited as containing 25, 27, or 46 lecture rooms.

The neighboring brownstone at 180 Remsen Street was converted into the McGarry Library. The library had space for 75,000 or 100,000 volumes, as well as microfilm, language, and reference rooms. 180 Remsen Street also had five reading rooms and a student-union center. The structure was demolished in 2003 and replaced with a 35,000-square-foot (3,300 m^{2}) academic center, which included a three-story library, 14 classrooms, and an auditorium with 95 seats. The facade of the academic center was designed to resemble that of the building at 176 Remsen Street.

== History ==
The Brooklyn Gas Light Company was established in 1825 to provide gas in Brooklyn, which at the time was a separate municipality from New York City, but the company did not begin supplying gas until 1849. The company spent $20,000 (equivalent to $716,667 in 2025) to erect a brownstone building at 180 Remsen Street in 1856. The building, completed the next year, was a two-story structure with large Tuscan columns on the ground story and large arched openings on the second story. The company was renamed the Brooklyn Union Gas Company in 1895, at which time it had acquired six other firms and served 100,000 customers. Brooklyn Union Gas continued to grow after James Jourdan became the firm's president the next year. Jourdan's son James H. Jourdan, who became a vice president of Brooklyn Union Gas in 1910 after his father died, began planning a new headquarters on Remsen Street in Downtown Brooklyn.

=== Development and Brooklyn Union Gas use ===
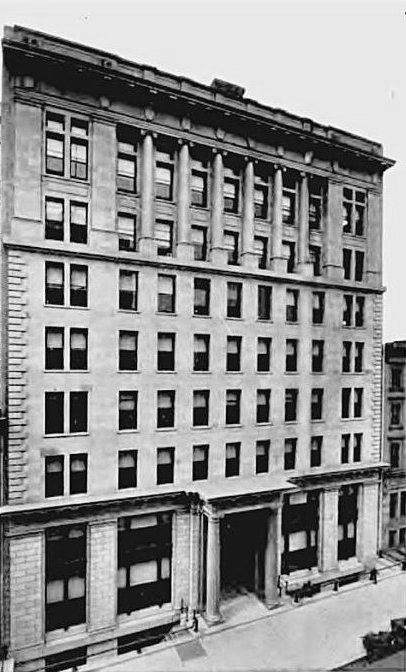
Early image of the building

The Brooklyn Union Gas Company acquired the houses at 172 to 178 Remsen Street, adjacent to its existing building at 180 Remsen Street, in February 1912 at an estimated cost of $200,000. The houses at 172 and 174 Remsen Street had been boarding-houses owned by lawyer E. T. Paul, while those at 176 and 178 Remsen Street had belonged to the Realty Associates. These were among a series of real-estate transactions that led the Brooklyn Daily Eagle to say: "The opinion is expressed by realty men that Remsen Street will soon become a business block like its neighbor, Montague Street." Brooklyn Union Gas planned a larger structure for its business at 172 to 178 Remsen Street, and it was selling the old residences' furnishings by that March. The existing headquarters at 180 Remsen Street was planned to become a sales and demonstration room. Brooklyn architect Frank Freeman was commissioned to design the new headquarters. The Eagle reported in October 1912 that the Fuller Company was about to raze the existing buildings at 172 to 178 Remsen Street.

The Brooklyn Union Gas Company Building was almost finished by November 1913; it was one of several commercial buildings being erected in Brooklyn Heights at the time. Brooklyn Life reported in August 1914 that the building had been "recently completed" at a cost of $500,000. The old headquarters at 180 Remsen Street was converted into Brooklyn Union Gas's Domestic Science Department, which featured a showroom. The showroom opened on January 22, 1915, and was intended as a gathering place for local women and as a place where lectures could be given. With the completion of the Brooklyn Union Gas Company's headquarters at 176 and 180 Remsen Street, the company could consolidate its 300 employees at one location.

The Brooklyn Union Gas Company began exhibiting gas-powered appliances permanently at 180 Remsen Street in 1925. This exhibit, according to the Brooklyn Citizen, showcased "every known appliance which may be fired by gas". The company continued to expand, erecting gas-generating plants on the Newtown Creek in the late 1920s. The building also hosted numerous events and exhibitions during the 1920s and 1930s, including annual Christmas celebrations (a practice which began in 1923), film screenings, cooking classes, and employee flower shows. To celebrate the centennial of the Brooklyn Gas Light Company's first gas service in Brooklyn, the company hosted an exhibition of gas appliances in the main building in 1949. By that time, the company was profitable and had helped fund the development of the Transcontinental Pipeline.

During December 1951, the Brooklyn Gas Company leased the third through sixth floors of the neighboring building at 186 Remsen Street, after the seventh and eighth stories of that structure had been demolished. The company constructed a doorway between its new space and the existing building at 180 Remsen Street. The company had expanded into southern Brooklyn and Staten Island by the end of that decade. Consequently, the company began to develop a new headquarters at 195 Montague Street to house its growing operations.

=== St. Francis College use ===
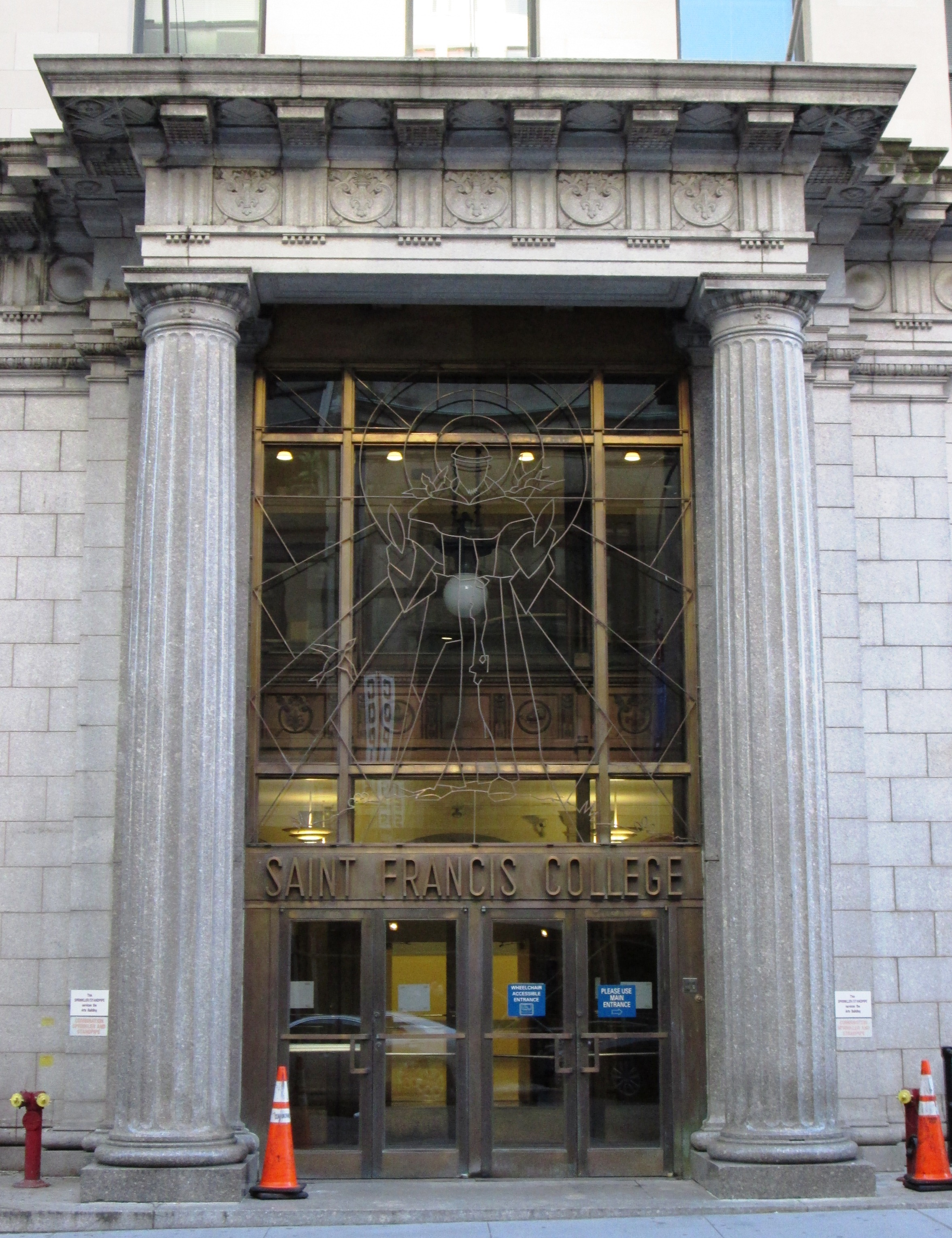
The entrance to the building in 2013

St. Francis College announced in April 1960 that it would buy 176 and 180 Remsen Street, as well as three adjacent five-story buildings at 162 to 166 Remsen Street, and convert them into a new Downtown Brooklyn campus. 176 Remsen Street would host classes for 1,200 students each during the day and night, while 180 Remsen Street would become a student union building. The college was also supposed to retain its old campus on Butler Street, but the Butler Street campus was razed in 1965. The college's development director Jarlath Murphy had selected the site so the institution could remain in the "heart of Brooklyn". The Remsen Street site was also close to the New York City Subway, the Long Island Rail Road, and several bus routes, making it ideal for St. Francis College, which was a commuter college. The structures cost $1.25 million (equivalent to $10 million in 2024). The Brooklyn Union Gas Company leased back both buildings until its new nearby headquarters was completed, and the gas company moved out during March 1962. Work began that May. The renovation of the first two buildings was scheduled to be completed in September 1963, but this date was pushed forward to September 1962 due to increases in enrollment.

Due to delays in construction, the buildings did not open until February 1, 1963. The college dedicated its five buildings on Remsen Street on May 21, 1963. According to the St. Francis College yearbook from that year, the relocation to 176 and 180 Remsen Street represented "a transformation and the formulation of a new image and purpose". In 1965, the college bought several sites to the west for a planned expansion of its campus along Remsen Street. This expansion was to include a new student union building and the Generoso Pope Athletic Complex, among other facilities. The buildings also began to house the public archives of Kings County, the county in New York that is coextensive with Brooklyn.

Although the Brooklyn Heights Historic District had been designated four decades earlier as the New York City Landmarks Preservation Commission (LPC)'s first historic district, the campus was just outside the district. The AIA Guide to New York City wrote that 180 Remsen Street had been "miraculously saved", but local civic group Brooklyn Heights Association had never formally sought landmark designation for the structure. St. Francis College demolished 180 Remsen Street in 2004, after no one tried to save it. The older structure was replaced by an academic center that opened in 2006. Afterward, the campus, including the Brooklyn Union Gas Building, carried the address 180 Remsen Street. In February 2009, the LPC expressed its intent to designate the 1914 building as an individual landmark. According to the Brooklyn Daily Eagle, there was speculation that St. Francis College officials supported the landmark designation so they could transfer the building's air rights to a nearby site. The LPC designated the Brooklyn Union Gas Building as a New York City landmark on May 10, 2011, along with the Constance Baker Motley Recreation Center in Midtown Manhattan.

=== Sale and later use ===
St. Francis College announced in May 2021 that it would be selling off its Remsen Street campus, including 180 Remsen Street. The college agreed to move to nearby Livingston Street; the sale of the Remsen Street buildings was intended to fund the relocation, which occurred in August 2022. Initially, Alexico Group expressed interest in redeveloping 180 Remsen Street into apartments. but this sale was not finalized. At the end of March 2023, Rockrose Development bought the college's buildings on Remsen Street for approximately $160 million. At the time, 180 Remsen Street and its neighboring structures had 500,000 ft^{2} (46,000 m^{2}) of space. Alexico sued the college and Rockrose in July 2023 for breach of contract, though the defendants sought to have the suit invalidated. Alexico claimed that, at the time of the sale, it had been reviewing the legal terms of a 19th-century covenant that required the buildings to be set back from the sidewalk. In October 2024, Rockrose filed plans to convert 180 Remsen Street and two nearby structures into 747 apartments.

== Critical reception ==
When the main building opened in 1914, Architecture and Building magazine wrote: "While many large public service companies erect architectural monuments, not infrequently of grandiose pretensions, this building, which cannot be criticised for any lack of architectural adornment where necessary, is above all a service building." The structure as a whole has been characterized as "a fine, stately office building demonstrating Freeman's infinite versatility." The AIA Guide to New York City says of the building that it is one of Freeman's "lesser work[s]". In designating the building as a landmark in 2011, LPC chairman Robert Tierney described 176 Remsen Street as "a reminder of a company that literally fueled the growth of a newly expanded City in the first decades of the 20th century".

== See also ==
- List of New York City Designated Landmarks in Brooklyn
