= Hexoloy =

Hexoloy is a registered trademark for a pressureless sintered form of alpha silicon carbide. Hexoloy SA is made by sintering silicon carbide powder. This process bonds the powder together to create a self-bonded product which is extremely hard and lightweight. It has a high resistance to corrosion, erosion, high temperature and thermal shock. It is ideal for applications involving liquid and hot gas exposure, mechanical seal faces, mineral and chemical processing kilns and furnaces. Even with use at high temperatures Hexoloy maintains high strength and stability. Hexoloy has high thermal conductivity, equal to that of stainless steel and 5 times that of alumina and excellent wear resistance – 50% harder than tungsten carbide.

== History ==
Sintered silicon carbide was patented by the Pittsburgh-based Carborundum Corporation in 1979 under U.S. patent 4,179,299. It is currently held by Saint-Gobain. It was registered and trademarked as Hexoloy in 1984. The first large commercial use for Hexoloy was in vehicle water pump seals.

== See also ==
- Silicon carbide
- Saint-Gobain
