= African Hunter =

1975 nonfiction book by James Ross Mellon

- Author: James Ross Mellon
- Language: English
- Publisher: Harcourt
- Publication date: 1975
- Pages: 522
- ISBN: 0151039542

African Hunter is a 1975 non-fiction book by James Ross Mellon. It chronicles hunting in Africa in general and the author's own safaris in particular.

In a 1976 review by John Barkham, African Hunter was called "a magnificent tribute to Africa's unique fauna" and "superbly illustrated". Writing for the Baltimore Sun, Jack Dawson described the volume as "probably the most comprehensive book on the subject ever produced", though opined on what he said was Mellon's "condescending attitude toward the native gun bearers [and] trackers". Edward P. Morgan celebrated the book as "adventure in the great tradition".

A second edition of African Hunter, published in the 1980s, was sold exclusively by Abercrombie & Fitch.
