= Matthew Mellon =

American businessman and fashion industry entrepreneur

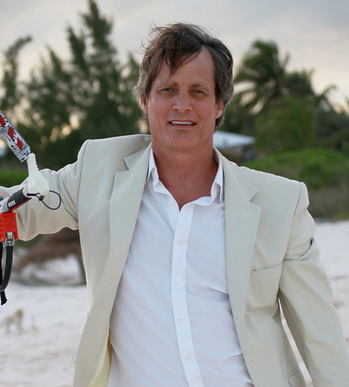
- Mellon in 2010
- Born: Matthew Taylor Mellon II; January 28, 1964; New York City, U.S.
- Died: April 16, 2018 (aged 54); Cancún, Quintana Roo, Mexico
- Occupations: Business, private equity investing
- Spouses: Tamara Mellon (divorced) Nicole Hanley (divorced)
- Children: 5
- Relatives: Christopher Mellon (brother); William Larimer Mellon Sr. (great-grandfather)
- Family: Mellon family

Matthew Taylor Mellon II (January 28, 1964 – April 16, 2018) was an American businessman and fashion industry entrepreneur who was also a chairman of the New York Republican State Committee's finance committee. He was a member of the Mellon family.

== Early life ==
Born in New York City to Karl Negley Mellon and Anne Stokes Bright, Mellon was raised in Manhattan, Palm Beach, Florida, and Northeast Harbor, Maine. He attended The Phelps School, a boys' boarding school in Malvern, Pennsylvania, followed by college at the Wharton School of the University of Pennsylvania, where he studied management. Mellon's father abandoned the family when he was five years old, before dying by suicide in 1983.

Mellon was a descendant of Judge Thomas Mellon, founder of the Mellon Bank (now part of The Bank of New York Mellon Corporation). Mellon was named after his paternal grandfather, Matthew Taylor Mellon, who was the elder son of businessman William Larimer Mellon Sr. On his maternal side, Mellon was a direct descendant of Anthony Joseph Drexel, a banker whose investment firm was a precursor to Drexel Burnham Lambert.

Mellon maintained associations with Drexel University and Carnegie Mellon University, both of which were founded by family members. He was also involved with the National Gallery of Art, the core of whose collection was donated to the nation by his great-uncle, Andrew Mellon. In the 1990s, he worked on developing a documentary on the life of philanthropist and saint Katharine Drexel.

== Career ==
After Mellon married Jimmy Choo co-founder Tamara Yeardye in 2000, Mellon designed some short-lived men's shoe products at her company.

In 2001, Mellon was the founder of a men's shoe collection under the label Harry's of London, which had German fund manager Max Gottschalk as chairman of the company, former managing director of Gucci UK Carlo Magello as director, and men's shoe designer Patrick Cox as part of the management team. The following transactions took place with Mellon's equity in the company he had founded:

- In 2006, Mellon sold a 40 percent stake to the Atelier Fund for $3.5 million.
- In 2011, Boston-based private equity firm Palladin Consumer Retail Partners LLC acquired a majority interest in Harry's, with Mellon still retaining a portion of the company's equity.
- In 2017, real estate developer and media entrepreneur Charles S. Cohen acquired the company.

When Mellon was engaged to designer Noelle Reno, together they launched, in 2007, a luxury tracksuits and cashmere fashion line under their label Degrees of Freedom. They later broke up and Mellon, and his new fiancée and future wife Nicole Hanley launched their fashion line of Hanley-Mellon in 2008.

Mellon was named Finance Chairman by State Chairman Ed Cox in May 2011. In February 2018, Forbes magazine reported that Mellon's $2 million investment in the cryptocurrency XRP turned into a $1 billion fortune.

== Personal life ==
Mellon had bipolar disorder, as did his father. Before their 2016 divorce, Mellon lived in New York City with his wife Nicole Hanley and their two children. He also had a daughter whom he raised jointly with his former wife, Tamara Mellon, the co-founder of shoe company Jimmy Choo. Prior to his marriage to Hanley, he was engaged to entrepreneur Noelle Reno, with whom he established a cashmere knitwear line.

Mellon's reported addiction to the prescription opioid OxyContin was said to be costing him $100,000 a month. He was quoted as saying "OxyContin is like legal heroin. And it needs to be addressed."

At the end of 2017, Mellon moved from New York to Los Angeles, renting a house in the Hollywood Hills for $150,000 a month. There, he led an active social life and began to spend much time with Kick Kennedy, the daughter of Robert F. Kennedy, Jr. In late March 2018, Mellon dined with President Donald Trump.

== Death ==
Mellon died in April 2018 in Cancún, Mexico, where he was planning to check into the Clear Sky Recovery clinic, which specializes in therapy utilising ibogaine, a medication with psychedelic properties. However, he was reported to have died in a hotel room in Cancún before arrival at the clinic, suffering a fatal heart attack after taking ayahuasca, a hallucinogenic drink.

In February 2026, an email from an anonymous source, addressed to and forwarded to the FBI by conservative radio host Eddy Aragon, was published as part of the Epstein files. The email briefly mentions the source's access to an alleged "Matthew Mellon video" tagged with "underage girl".
