= William Larimer Mellon Sr. =

American businessman (1868–1949)

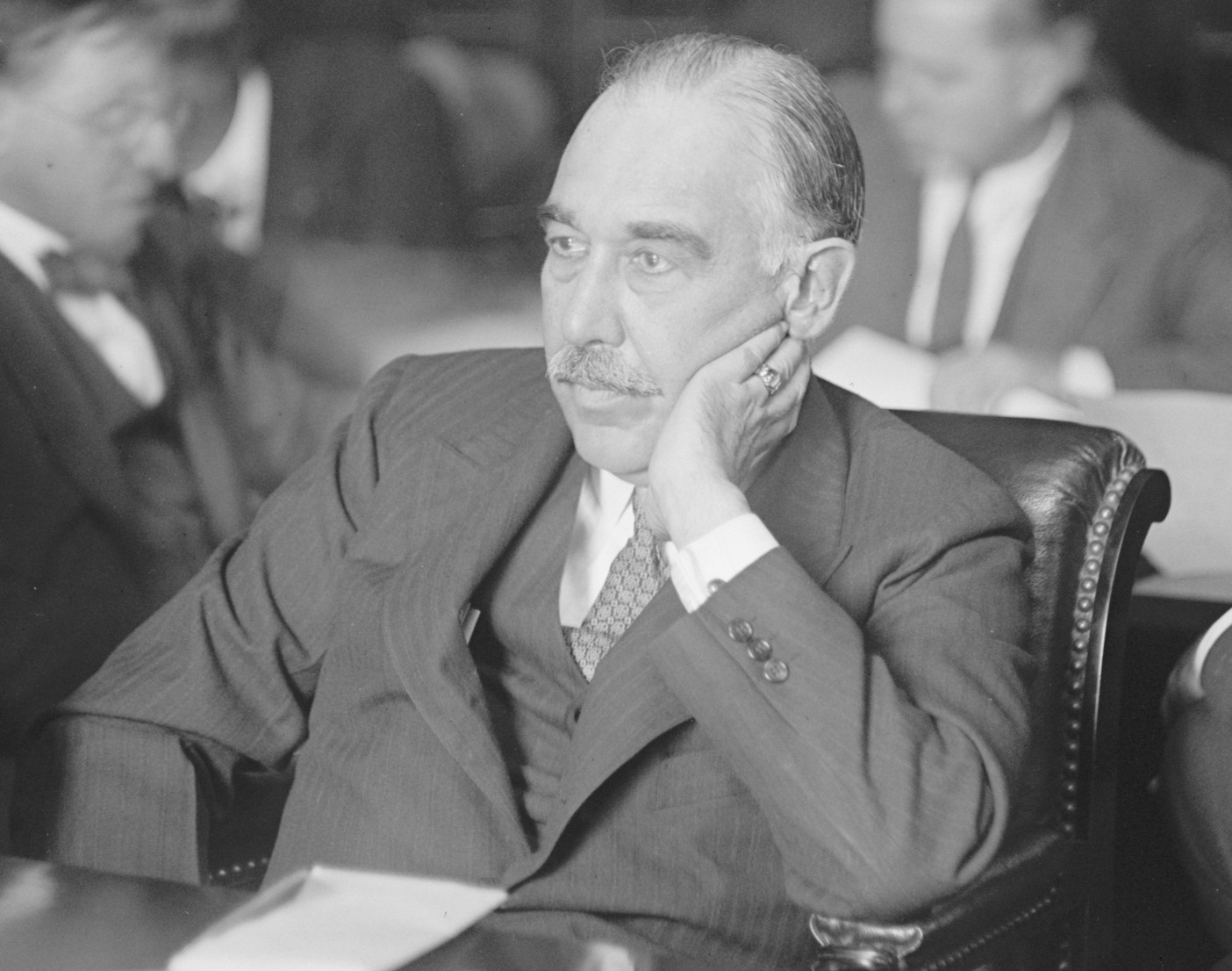
- Mellon before a congressional committee in October 1924

Chairman of the Pennsylvania Republican Party
- In office June 15, 1926 – May 12, 1928
- Preceded by: Harry Baker
- Succeeded by: Edward Martin

Personal details
- Born: June 1, 1868 Pittsburgh, Pennsylvania
- Died: October 9, 1949 (aged 81) Pittsburgh, Pennsylvania
- Party: Republican
- Spouse: Mary Hill Taylor
- Children: Matthew Taylor Mellon I Rachel Mellon Walton; Margaret Mellon Hitchcock; William Larimer Mellon Jr.
- Occupation: Businessman

William Larimer Mellon Sr. (June 1, 1868 – October 9, 1949), sometimes referred to as W. L., was an American businessman who was active in Republican Party politics. A co-founder of Gulf Oil, he was a member of the prominent Mellon family of Pittsburgh, Pennsylvania.

According to The Miami News, "Politically, Mellon was known as the 'field marshal' for the Mellon political forces in the days preceding the New Deal.

== Formative years and family ==
Born as William Larimer Mellon in Pittsburgh on June 1, 1868, William L. Mellon was a son of James Ross Mellon and Rachel Larimer. His father was the second son of Judge Thomas Mellon, and his mother was a daughter of railroad and land baron William Larimer Jr.

After spending part of his childhood in the West with his uncle Andrew Mellon, who deeply influenced him, William L. Mellon married Mary Hill Taylor. They had four children: Matthew Taylor Mellon I, PhD (1897-1992), who was an American Studies professor at the University of Freiburg from 1928 to 1939; Rachel Mellon Walton (1899-2006), a philanthropist who became the longest serving board member of the Pittsburgh Symphony Orchestra; Margaret Mellon Hitchcock (1901-1998), and William Larimer Mellon Jr., MD (1910-1989), a physician and humanitarian who established a medical mission in Haiti.

During the early 1900s, William Mellon purchased the Vagabondia, which was described by multiple news outlets as a "houseboat" and by The Miami News as a "sleek black yacht." During one of his trips on the yacht in 1913, he engaged in alligator hunting. The yacht later became a subject of frequent news reports when William's uncle Andrew W. Mellon and family began using it while Andrew was serving as the U.S. Secretary of the Treasury.

== Business and political career ==
During the 1880s, William L. Mellon developed an interest in the burgeoning petroleum industry in Pennsylvania, but he switched his business interests to the construction and operation of railway systems before the end of the decade when his nascent oil company was bought out by John D. Rockefeller's Standard Oil in 1895.

Still involved in railway construction when the Mellon family invested in an oil well in Spindletop, Texas after oil was discovered there in 1901, Mellon resumed his interest in the oil industry in 1902 when he was sent to Texas by the family to investigate why that well had begun to decline. He then took on a progressively larger role in management.

In January 1907, Mellon helped established the Gulf Oil Corporation, which proceeded to build a pipeline from Oklahoma to Port Arthur, Texas; it was shipping Oklahoma crude oil to port by September. Gulf Oil expanded steadily thereafter, becoming one of the largest oil companies in the United States. William L. Mellon later became involved in Republican Party politics. During the fall of 1924, his name was in the news frequently as he testified during United States Senate hearings about potential political corruption. Known at the time as the Borah Committee hearings, these sessions were held to investigate expenditures of more than $3,451,000 that had allegedly been made by the Republican Party to influence voter opinions regarding various issues being debated at the federal level. Mellon subsequently served as chairman of the Pennsylvania Republican Party from 1926 to 1928.

He retired from Gulf Oil in 1948.

== Philanthropy and legacy ==
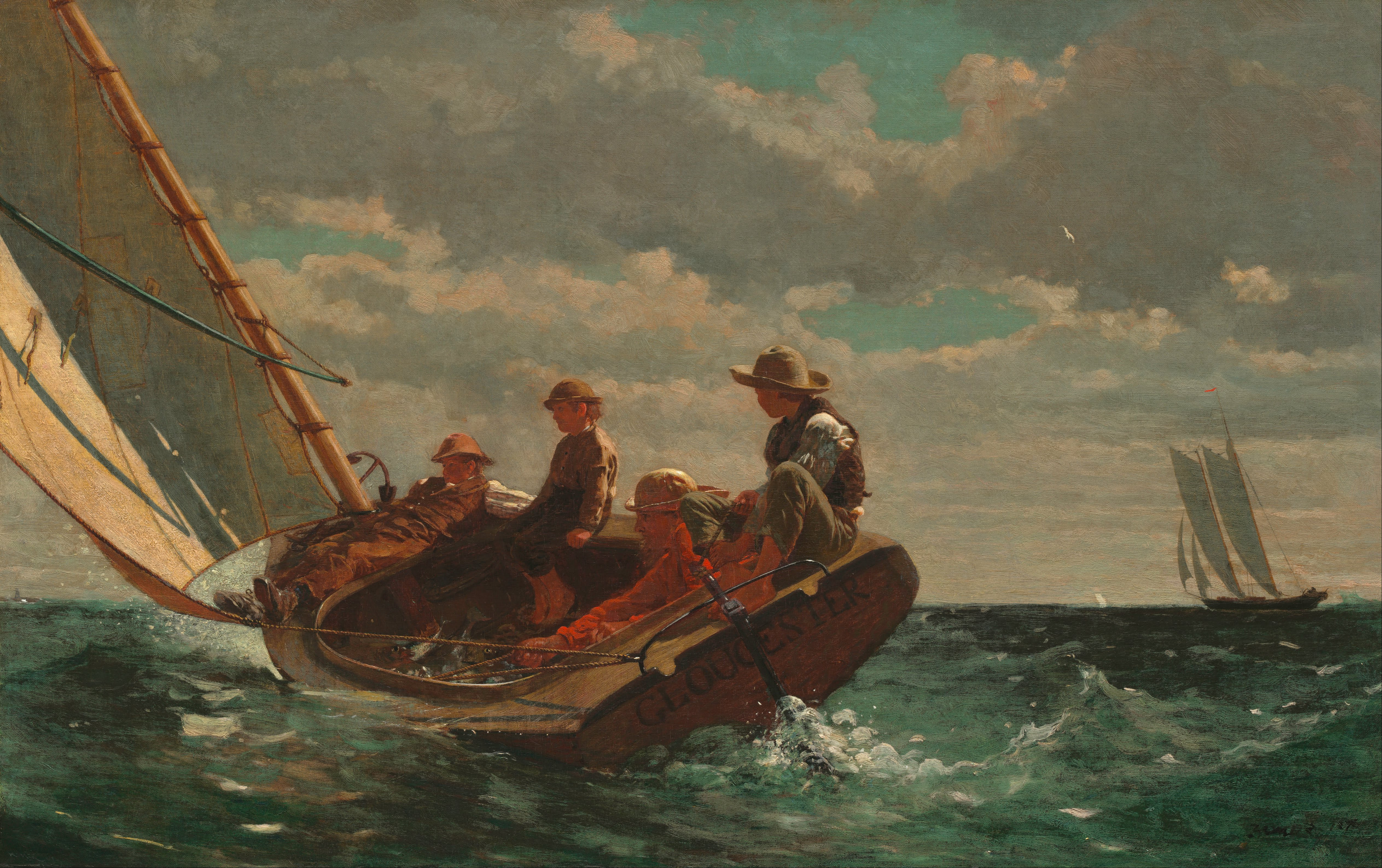
Winslow Homer's "Breezing Up (A Fair Wind)" was a Gift to the National Gallery of Art by the W. L. and May T. Mellon Foundation

In 1939, William L. Mellon Sr. established The W. L. and May T. Mellon Foundation. Ten years later, in 1949, Mellon donated six million dollars to establish the graduate school of industrial administration at the Carnegie Institute of Technology in Pittsburgh, which is today the David A. Tepper School of Business at Carnegie Mellon University.

In 1997, the W.L. Mellon Society was established in Mellon's honor within the Tepper School of Business at Carnegie Mellon University. Its mission is to encourage both individual and corporate matching gift donations to support the school's operations.

== Death, funeral and interment ==
Pre-deceased by his wife, Mary (Taylor) Mellon, William L. Mellon, Sr. died at home at the age of 81 at 2:00 p.m. on Saturday, October 9, 1949. Funeral services were held at his family's home on Darlington Road in Pittsburgh. He was interred in the Homewood Cemetery.

== Resolution of his estate ==
Following Mellon's death, his children were mentioned repeatedly in multiple newspapers across the United States, in both reports about his death and in reports of the probate of his multi-million-dollar estate, which was ultimately divided equally among the four children. In addition to ensuring that trust funds would be set up for each of his children in equal amounts after the payment of estate taxes, Mellon directed that $100,000 be given to the husband of his daughter, Rachel, and also arranged for $75,000 to be distributed among staff who were employed personally by Mellon at the time of his death. By the time that Mellon's $23,186,736 estate was finally settled during the summer of 1954, his four children were awarded just $246,317 each because the estate's final value had been reduced to $6,149,922 net, following the payment of taxes and estate administration costs.
