= List of ice hockey leagues =

This is a list of ice hockey leagues, both professional and amateur, from around the world; parentheses denote year of establishment and, where applicable, year of disestablishment.

== North America ==
=== Men ===
==== Major professional ====
- National Hockey League (1917) (Canada; United States)

==== Minor professional ====
- American Hockey League (1936) (United States; Canada) AAA
- ECHL (1988 as East Coast Hockey League) (United States; Canada) AA
- SPHL (2004 as Southern Professional Hockey League) (United States) A
- FPHL (Federal Prospects Hockey League) (2010) (United States) A
- Ligue Nord-Américaine de Hockey (1996 as Quebec Semi-Pro Hockey League) (Canada) A

==== Three-on-three ====
- 3ICE (2022)

==== Junior ====
===== Major junior =====
- Canadian Hockey League (governing authority)
  - Ontario Hockey League (1933) (Canada; United States)
  - Quebec Maritimes Junior Hockey League (1969) (Canada)
  - Western Hockey League (1966) (Canada; United States)

===== Junior A =====
====== Hockey Canada junior A leagues ======
- Canadian Junior Hockey League (association of Junior A leagues in Canada)
  - Alberta Junior Hockey League
  - British Columbia Hockey Conference (pending membership approval)
  - Central Canada Hockey League
  - Quebec Junior Hockey League
  - Manitoba Junior Hockey League
  - Maritime Junior A Hockey League
  - Northern Ontario Junior Hockey League
  - Ontario Junior Hockey League
  - Saskatchewan Junior Hockey League
  - Superior International Junior Hockey League

Tier 2

  - Pacific Junior Hockey League

====== USA Hockey junior leagues ======
Tier I

- United States Hockey League (1979)

Tier II

- North American Hockey League (1975)

Tier III

- North American 3 Hockey League (1970) – formerly the Central States Hockey League

Independent junior leagues

- British Columbia Hockey League (1961)
- Eastern Hockey League (EHL and EHL Premier) (2013)
- Greater Metro Junior A Hockey League (2006)
- Manitoba Major Junior Hockey League (1970)
- National Junior Hockey League
- United States Premier Hockey League (NCDC, Premier, and Elite) (2013)
  - National Collegiate Development Conference (2017)
- Vancouver Island Junior Hockey League
- Western International Junior Hockey League

===== Junior B =====
====== Hockey Canada junior B leagues ======
- Calgary Junior Hockey League
- Capital Junior Hockey League
- Capital Region Junior Hockey League (2018)
- Eastern Ontario Junior Hockey League formerly the Central Canada Hockey League Tier 2
- Greater Ontario Junior Hockey League (OHA)
- Heritage Junior B Hockey League
- Island Junior Hockey League
- Keystone Junior Hockey League formerly the Manitoba Junior B Hockey League
- Lakehead Junior Hockey League formerly the Thunder Bay Junior B Hockey League
- Ligue de Hockey de La Capitale *
- Ligue de Hockey Chaudière-Appalaches Junior AA *
- Ligue de Hockey Estrie-Mauricie Junior AA *
- Ligue de Hockey Lac St. Louis Junior AA *
- Ligue de Hockey Laurentides-Lanaudière Junior AA*
- Ligue de Hockey Métropolitaine Junior AA * formerly the Richelieu Junior AA Hockey League
- Ligue de Hockey Saguenay-Lac-St-Jean Junior AA *
- New Brunswick Junior B Hockey League
- North Eastern Alberta Junior B Hockey League
- North West Junior Hockey League
- Nova Scotia Junior Hockey League
- Prairie Junior Hockey League formerly the South Saskatchewan Junior B Hockey League, merged with North Saskatchewan Junior B Hockey League
- St. John's Junior Hockey League

(*) Quebec Junior "AA" is roughly equal to Ontario Junior "B"

===== Junior C =====
====== Hockey Canada junior C leagues ======
- Calgary Junior C Hockey League
- Hanover Tache Junior Hockey League
- Ligue de Hockey Junior A Bois-Francs *
- Ligue de Hockey Junior A Rive-Sud *
- Ligue Interzone de hockey mineur BC Rive Nord (Junior A)
- National Capital Junior Hockey League formerly the Eastern Ontario Junior C Hockey League
- New Brunswick Junior B Hockey League
- Noralta Junior Hockey League
- Nova Scotia Regional Junior Hockey League
- Prince Edward Island Junior C Hockey League formerly the Prince Edward Island Minor Junior Hockey League
- Provincial Junior Hockey League (OHA) 2016-17 - Merging of the 8 Southern Ontario's Jr. C Leagues
- Qu'Appelle Valley Hockey League formerly the Saskatchewan Junior C Hockey League

(*) Quebec Junior "A" is roughly equal to Ontario Junior "C"

===== Junior D =====
- Ligue Interzone de hockey mineur BC Rive Nord (Junior B) (Canada) *

(*) Quebec Junior "B" is roughly equal to Ontario Junior "D"

==== Collegiate ====
===== U Sports hockey (Canada) =====
- U Sports (Canada, varsity)
  - Atlantic University Sport
  - Canada West Universities Athletic Association
  - Ontario University Athletics
  - Réseau du sport étudiant du Québec
- Alberta Colleges Athletics Conference
- British Columbia Intercollegiate Hockey League

===== NCAA hockey (United States) =====
- National Collegiate Athletic Association (United States, varsity)
  - Division I
    - Atlantic Hockey
    - Big Ten
    - Central Collegiate Hockey Association
    - ECAC Hockey (both sexes)
    - Hockey East (both sexes)
    - National Collegiate Hockey Conference
  - Division II
    - Northeast-10 Conference
  - Division III
    - Commonwealth Coast Conference
    - Massachusetts State Collegiate Athletic Conference
    - Midwest Collegiate Hockey Association
    - Minnesota Intercollegiate Athletic Conference
    - New England Hockey Conference
    - Northern Collegiate Hockey Association
    - New England Small College Athletic Conference
    - State University of New York Athletic Conference
    - United Collegiate Hockey Conference
    - Wisconsin Intercollegiate Athletic Conference

Notes

- Two all-sports conferences, the Division I Ivy League and Division III Middle Atlantic Conference, officially sponsor ice hockey for both men and women, but neither hold conference tournaments nor compete for their own automatic bids to the NCAA tournament. All of the hockey-sponsoring schools in both leagues are members of hockey-only leagues and compete for those leagues' automatic bids, with Ivy League members competing in ECAC Hockey and MAC members competing in the United Collegiate Hockey Conference. The Ivies and MAC both extrapolate their own conference champions from results of regular-season games between their own members.
- The Northeast-10 sponsors a championship for its members that play men's ice hockey, but the NCAA doesn't currently sponsor a national championship at Division II level for either sex. All members of that conference with women's teams participate in the NEWHA.

===== NAIA hockey (United States) =====
- National Association of Intercollegiate Athletics (United States, varsity)
  - Wolverine–Hoosier Athletic Conference (WHAC)

Note: there are also independent teams outside of the WHAC.

===== ACHA and AAU College Hockey hockey (United States and Canada) =====
- American Collegiate Hockey Association (United States; Canada)
  - Men's Division 1
    - Central States Collegiate Hockey League (CSCHL)
    - College Hockey Mid-America (CHMA)
    - Eastern Collegiate Hockey Association (ECHA)
    - Eastern States Collegiate Hockey League (ESCHL)
    - Great Lakes Collegiate Hockey League (GLCHL)
    - Northeast Collegiate Hockey League (NECHL)
    - Western Collegiate Hockey League (WCHL)
  - Men's Division 2
    - Atlantic Coast Collegiate Hockey League (ACCHL)
    - Colonial States College Hockey Conference (CSCHC)
    - Mid-American Collegiate Hockey Association (MACHA) (Gold Division)
    - Mid-Atlantic Collegiate Hockey Association (MACH)
    - Mountain West Collegiate Hockey League (MWCHL)
    - Northeast Collegiate Hockey Association (NECHA) (Patriot & American Conferences)
    - Northern Collegiate Hockey League (NCHL)
    - Pacific 8 Intercollegiate Hockey Conference (PAC-8)
    - Pacific Collegiate Hockey Association (PCHA)
    - Super East Collegiate Hockey League (SECHL)
    - Texas Collegiate Hockey Conference (TCHC)
    - Tri-State Collegiate Hockey League (TSCHL)
    - Upstate New York Club Hockey League (UNYCHL)
    - West Coast Hockey Conference (WCHC)
    - Western Collegiate Club Hockey Association (WCCHA)
  - Men's Division 3
    - Blue Ridge Hockey Conference (BRHC)
    - College Hockey Association (CHA) (Contains Non-ACHA members)
    - College Hockey East (CHE)
    - Delaware Valley Collegiate Hockey Conference (DVCHC)
    - Empire Collegiate Hockey Conference (ECHC)
    - Indiana Collegiate Hockey Conference (ICHC)
    - Mason-Dixon Collegiate Hockey Association (MDCHA)
    - Metropolitan Collegiate Hockey Conference (MCHC)
    - Michigan Collegiate Hockey Conference (MCHC)
    - Mid-American Collegiate Hockey Association (MACHA) (Silver division)
    - North Central Collegiate Hockey Association (NCCHA)
    - Northeast Collegiate Hockey Association (NECHA) (Colonial Conference)
    - College Hockey South (CHS)
    - Southern Collegiate Hockey Conference (SCHC)

=== Women ===
==== Professional ====
- Professional Women's Hockey League (2023)

===== Amateur =====
- Mid-Atlantic Women's Hockey League (1975)

==== Junior and youth ====
- BC Elite Hockey League (BCEHL U18FAAA) (2007; formerly BCFMAAAHL)
- Junior Women's Hockey League (JWHL) (2007)
- Livonia Hockey Association
- Ontario Women's Hockey League (OWHL) (2004)
- Saskatchewan Female U18 AAA Hockey League (SFU18AAAHL) (2006; formerly SFMAAAHL)

==== Collegiate ====
===== NCAA (United States) =====
- National Collegiate Athletic Association
  - Division I (2000)
    - College Hockey America (CHA)
    - ECAC Hockey
    - Hockey East (HEA or WHEA)
    - New England Women's Hockey Alliance (NEWHA)
    - Western Collegiate Hockey Association (WCHA)
  - Division II
    - Northeast-10 Conference
  - Division III
    - Commonwealth Coast Conference (CCC)
    - Minnesota Intercollegiate Athletic Conference (MIAC)
    - New England Hockey Conference (NEHC)
    - New England Small College Athletic Conference (NESCAC)
    - Northern Collegiate Hockey Association (NCHA)
    - State University of New York Athletic Conference (SUNYAC; 2023)
    - United Collegiate Hockey Conference (UCHC)
    - Wisconsin Intercollegiate Athletic Conference (WIAC)

Notes

- Two all-sports conferences, the Ivy League (Division I) and Middle Atlantic Conference (Division III), officially sponsor women's ice hockey, but neither hold conference tournaments nor compete for their own automatic bids to the NCAA tournament. All of the ice hockey-sponsoring schools in both leagues are members of hockey-only leagues and compete for those leagues' automatic bids, with Ivy League members competing in ECAC Hockey and MAC members competing in the United Collegiate Hockey Conference. The Ivies and MAC both extrapolate their own conference champions from results of regular-season games between their own members.
- The NCAA doesn't currently sponsor a national championship at Division II level for either sex. All members of the Northeast-10 conference with women's teams participate in the NEWHA.

===== NAIA hockey =====
- National Association of Intercollegiate Athletics (United States)
  - Wolverine–Hoosier Athletic Conference (WHAC)

Note: there are also independent teams outside of the WHAC.

===== U Sports (Canada) =====
- U Sports (1998)
  - Atlantic University Sport (AUS)
  - Canada West Universities Athletic Association (Canada West)
  - Ontario University Athletics (OUA)
  - Réseau du sport étudiant du Québec (RSEQ) (1999)

===== ACHA and AAU =====
- American Collegiate Hockey Association (Canada, United States)
  - Division 1
    - Central Collegiate Women's Hockey Association (CCWHA Division I)
    - Eastern Collegiate Women's Hockey League (ECWHL)
    - Western Women's Collegiate Hockey League (WWCHL)
    - Women's Midwest College Hockey (WMCH)
  - Division 2
    - Central Collegiate Women's Hockey Association (CCWHA Division II)
    - College Hockey East (CHE)
    - Delaware Valley Collegiate Hockey Conference (DVCHC Women's)
    - Independent Women's Collegiate Hockey League (IWCHL)

Notes

- There are also many independent teams in both ACHA divisions in addition to the many within the hockey conferences and leagues
- The CCWHA includes both a Division 1 and a Division 2 conference, with separate groups of teams as members

=== Senior ===
==== Sanctioned by Hockey Canada or USA Hockey ====
===== Canada =====
- Alberta
  - East Central Senior Hockey League
  - North Central Hockey League
  - North Peace Hockey League (Also in British Columbia)
  - Ranchland Hockey League
  - Sask/Alta Senior Hockey League (Also in Saskatchewan)
- British Columbia
  - Central Interior Hockey League
  - West Coast Senior AA Hockey League
- Manitoba
  - South Eastern Manitoba Hockey League
  - Tiger Hills Hockey League
- New Brunswick
  - Ligue de Hockey Sénior Beauséjour
- Newfoundland and Labrador
  - Avalon East Senior Hockey League
  - Central West Senior Hockey League
- Nunavut
  - Rankin Inlet Senior Men's Hockey League
- Ontario
  - Allan Cup Hockey
  - Eastern Ontario Super Hockey League
  - Ontario Elite Hockey League
  - Ontario Super Hockey League
- Prince Edward Island
  - PEI Senior Hockey League
- Quebec
  - Circuit Sénior KRTB
  - Ligue de Hockey Côte-Sud
  - Ligue de Hockey Sénior A du Lac St-Louis
  - Ligue de Hockey Sénior AA de la Côte-Nord
  - Ligue de Hockey Sénior AAA du Québec
  - Ligue de Hockey Sénior Desjardins de l'Est-du-Québec
  - Ligue de Hockey Sénior Élite
  - Ligue de Hockey Sénior Lac-au-Fleuve
  - Ligue de Hockey Vallée-Appalaches
  - Ligue Régionale de Hockey
- Saskatchewan
  - Big 6 Hockey League
  - Cross Roads Hockey League
  - Long Lake Hockey League
  - Notekeu Hockey League
  - Prairie Men's Hockey League
  - Qu’Appelle Valley Highway Hockey League
  - Sask East Hockey League
  - Sask West Hockey League
  - Saskatchewan Prairie Hockey League
  - Saskatchewan Valley Hockey League
  - Treaty Six Hockey League
  - Twin Rivers Hockey League
  - Wheatland Senior Hockey League
  - White Mud Hockey League

===== United States =====
- Great Lakes Hockey League (1937)
- Mountain West Hockey League (2012)
- Michigan Independence Hockey League (Michigan, United States)
- American Premier Hockey League (United States)

==== Not sanctioned by Hockey Canada or USA Hockey ====
===== Canada =====
- Ontario
  - Northern Premier Hockey League (2019) formerly the Eastern Ontario Super Hockey League

=== School and youth ===
- Central States Developmental Hockey League
- Manitoba Midget 'AAA' Hockey League
- United States Premier Hockey League (2013)
- Ontario Minor Hockey Association
- Greater Toronto Hockey League
- Nova Scotia U18 Major Hockey League

==== High school ====
- Interscholastic Hockey League
- Massachusetts Interscholastic Athletic Association (MIAA)
  - Super Eight (hockey)
- Midwest Prep Hockey League
- Minnesota State High School League boys hockey
- Missouri high school hockey
  - Mid-States Club Hockey Association (MSCHA)
  - Mid America High School Hockey League (MAHSHL)
- New Jersey State Interscholastic Athletic Association
- New York high school hockey
  - New York State Public High School Athletic Association (varsity)
- North Dakota High School Activities Association
- Northern Virginia Scholastic Hockey League
- Ohio High School Athletic Association
- Pennsylvania high school hockey
  - Penguins Cup
  - Flyers Cup
- Washington high school hockey
- West Virginia high school hockey (Penguins Cup)
- Wisconsin high school hockey
  - Wisconsin Interscholastic Athletic Association

=== Defunct leagues ===
- Alberta Elite Junior Hockey League (2025)
- All-American Hockey League (1987–1988)
- All American Hockey League (2008–2011)
- America East Hockey League (2005–2008)
- Amateur Hockey Association of Canada (1886–1898)
- American Amateur Hockey League (1896–1917)
- American Hockey Association (1926–1942)
- Atlantic Coast Hockey League (1981–1987)
- Atlantic Coast Hockey League (2002–2003)
- California Hockey League (1928–1933)
- California Hockey League (1957–1963)
- Canadian Amateur Hockey League (1899–1905)
- Canadian–American Hockey League (1926–1936)
- Canadian Elite Hockey League (2005–2006)
- Canadian Hockey Association (1909–1910)
- Canadian International Hockey League (2014) – played one season
- Canadian Premier Junior Hockey League (2016–2022)
- Canadian Women's Hockey League (2007–2019)
- Canadian Professional Hockey League (1926–1930)
- Can-Am Junior Hockey League (2022-2025)
- Central Ontario Junior C Hockey League (1970–2016) – became Orr Division of the PJHL
- Central Hockey League (1963–1984)
- Central Hockey League (1992–2014)
- Central Ontario Hockey League (Unknown–1980)
- Central Ontario Women's Hockey League (1992–1998)
- Central West Junior Hockey League (relegated from Jr B in 2014 and became inactive)
- College Hockey America men's division (NCAA Division I, 1999–2010; remains in operation as a women's only conference)
- Colonial Hockey Conference (2015–2020; all programs in conference moved to Commonwealth Coast Conference)
- Colored Hockey League (1895–1925)
- Continental Elite Hockey League (2001–2004)
- Continental Hockey League (1972–1987) – became All-American Hockey League
- Eastern Amateur Hockey League (1933–1934, 1935–1948, 1949–1953)
- Eastern Canada Amateur Hockey Association (1905–1909)
- Eastern Canada Amateur Hockey League (1923–Unknown)
- Eastern Hockey League (1934–1935, 1954–1973, 1978–1981)
- Eastern Junior Hockey League (1993–2013) – some teams split from the league to form the United States Premier Hockey League and the remaining teams joined the Eastern Hockey League
- Eastern Junior B Hockey League (1951–1972)
- Eastern Ontario Senior Hockey League (2003–2008)
- Eastern Professional Hockey League (2008–2009)
- Eastern Professional Hockey League (1914–1915, 1959–1963)
- Eastern States Hockey League (2003–2013) formerly the Continental Hockey Association 2003–2011
- EJHL South (2006–2013; formerly the Southeastern Junior Hockey League) – affiliated with the Eastern Junior Hockey League from 2011–2013 before merging with the United States Premier Hockey League as the Elite Division
- Empire Junior Hockey League (c. 1999–2013) – merged with the United States Premier Hockey League as the Empire Division
- Empire B Junior C Hockey League (1989–2016) – became Tod Division of the PJHL
- Federal Amateur Hockey League (1904–1909)
- Georgian Mid-Ontario Junior C Hockey League (Unknown–2016) – became Carruthers Division of the PJHL
- Global Hockey League (proposed league in 1990; did not play)
- Great Lakes Junior Hockey League (2008–2012)
- Great Lakes Junior C Hockey League (1968–2016) – became Bill Stobbs Division of the PJHL
- Great West Hockey Conference (NCAA Division I, 1985–1988)
- Gulf Coast Hockey League (2001–2002)
- International-American Hockey League (1936–1941) - became American Hockey League
- International Independent Hockey League (2003)
- International Hockey League (1929–1936)
- International Hockey League (1945–2001)
- International Professional Hockey League (1904–1907)
- Interprovincial Amateur Hockey Union (1908–1914)
- Interprovincial Professional Hockey League (1910–1911)
- Kootenay International Junior Hockey League (1966-2026)
- Ligue Centrale de Hockey (1978–2008)
- Ligue de Hockey Junior de Montréal (1976–Unknown)
- Major Intermediate A Hockey League (1978–1983)
- Manitoba Hockey Association (1907–1909; formerly Manitoba Professional Hockey League and the Manitoba Hockey League)
- Maritime Major Hockey League (1950–1954)
- Maritime Professional Hockey League (1911–1914)
- Metro Atlantic Athletic Conference (NCAA Division I, 1997–2003; conference remains in operation as an all-sports league without ice hockey)
- Metro Junior A Hockey League (1991–1998) – merged with Ontario Provincial Junior A Hockey League
- Metropolitan Junior Hockey League (1966–2017) – played last season as the North American 3 Atlantic Hockey League (2016–17) and the remaining teams joined the Eastern Hockey League
- Mid-Atlantic Hockey League (2007–2008)
- Midwest Junior Hockey League (2012–2015) – merged with United States Premier Hockey League
- Midwestern Junior C Hockey League (2013–2016) – became Pat Doherty Division of the PJHL
- Minnesota Junior Hockey League (1974–2015) – merged with United States Premier Hockey League
- National College Prospects Hockey League (2016–2017) – folded after one season and was AAU sanctioned
- National Hockey Association (1909–1917)
- National Women's Hockey League (1999-2007)
- Niagara & District Junior C Hockey League (1974–2016) – became Bloomfield Division of the PJHL
- North American 3 Eastern Hockey League (2012–2016; formerly the Northern States Hockey League, 2012–2014) - merged with North American 3 Hockey League
- North American Hockey League (1973–1977)
- Northeast Women's Hockey League (NCAA Division III, 2017–2023) – conference was absorbed by SUNYAC in 2023
- North Eastern Hockey League (2003–2008)
- North of Superior Junior B Hockey League (1996–2004)
- North West Hockey League (1933–1936)
- Northern Junior Hockey League (2008–2010; formerly United Junior Hockey League)
- Northern Ontario Junior Hockey Association (1962–1972)
- Northern Pacific Hockey League (2000–2016) – folded and remaining teams joined the United States Premier Hockey League
- Northern States Junior Hockey League (2012–2014) - became the North American 3 Eastern Hockey League
- Northwest Junior Hockey League (1992–2004)
- Ontario Professional Hockey League (1907–1911, 1930–1931)
- Original Stars Hockey League (2004)
- Ottawa City Hockey League (1890–1957)
- Pacific Coast Hockey Association (1911–1924)
- Pacific Coast Hockey League (1928–1931, 1936–1941, 1945–1952)
- Pacific Junior A Hockey League (1971–1979)
- Pacific Hockey League (1977–1979)
- Pacific Hockey League (1994–1995)
- Prairie Hockey League (1926–1928)
- Premier Hockey Federation (2015–2023; formerly National Women's Hockey League, 2015–2021)
- Quebec Hockey League (1952–1959)
- Quebec Senior Hockey League (1945–1952)
- Rocky Mountain Junior Hockey League (1975–1999; also known as Peace Junior B Hockey League and Peace-Cariboo Junior Hockey League, 1975–1991)
- Rocky Mountain Junior Hockey League (2015–2018)
- South East Hockey League (2003–2004)
- Southern Elite Hockey League (1998–2000)
- Southern Hockey League (1973–1977)
- Southern Hockey League (1995–1996)
- Southern Ontario Junior A Hockey League (1972–1976) – merged with Ontario Provincial Junior A Hockey League
- Southern Ontario Junior Hockey League (1960–2016) – became Yeck Division of the PJHL
- Southwest Hockey League (1975–1977)
- Sunshine Hockey League (1992–1995)
- Tri-State Hockey League (1932–1933)
- Tri-State League (NCAA Division I, 1950–1972)
- Tropical Hockey League (1938–1939)
- United Hockey League (1991–2010; formerly Colonial Hockey League, 1991–1997, and International Hockey League, 2007–2010)
- United States Hockey League (1945–1951)
- USA Central Hockey League (2018)
- Western Canada Hockey League (professional) (1921–1925)
- Western Canada Hockey League (minor pro) (1932–1933)
- Western Canada Senior Hockey League (1945–1951)
- Western Ontario Junior C Hockey League (1966–2016; formerly Western Junior C Hockey League, 1966–1970; Central Junior C Hockey League, 1970–1980; and the Grey-Bruce Junior C Hockey League, 1980–1988) – became Pollock Division of the PJHL
- West Coast Hockey League (1995–2003)
- Western Canada Hockey League (1921–1926; known as Western Hockey League, 1925–1926)
- Western Hockey League (1952–1974)
- Western International Hockey League (1946–1962, 1963–1988)
- Western Professional Hockey League (1996–2001)
- Western States Hockey League (1994–2022)
- Western Women's Hockey League (2004–2011)
- World Hockey Association (1972–1979)
- World Hockey Association 2 (2003–2004)
- World United Hockey League (2014–2015)
- WHA Junior Hockey League (2006–2008)

== South America ==
=== Argentina ===
- Torneo Nacional Masculino

=== Brazil ===
- Campeonato Brasileiro de Ice Hockey

=== Peru ===
- Peru Championship

== Africa ==
=== Egypt ===
- Ramadani Championship

=== Kenya ===
- Kenya Ice Hockey League

=== Morocco ===
- Championnat Marocain de Hockey sur Glace

=== South Africa ===
==== Professional ====
- South African Super League

==== Minor professional ====
- Western Province Ice Hockey League (c. 2002)

==== Semi-pro and amateur ====
- Gauteng Premier Hockey League (c. 2005)

== Asia ==
=== Multinational ===
- Asia League Ice Hockey (AL) (2003) – multinational professional league with teams from Japan and South Korea; teams from China and Russia have previously participated
- European Women's Hockey League (EWHL) (2004) – multinational semi-pro league with teams from Austria, Hungary, Italy, Kazakhstan, Poland, and Slovakia; teams from Belarus, Croatia, the Czech Republic, Denmark, Germany, the Netherlands, and Slovenia have previously participated

=== Armenia ===
- Armenian Hockey League (2000)

=== Bahrein ===
- Bahraini Ice Hockey League

=== China ===
==== Men ====
===== Minor professional =====
- Chinese Ice Hockey League (2024)

===== Semi-pro and amateur =====
- Chinese Ice Hockey Championship (1953)
- Beijing International Ice Hockey League (1995)
- Shanghai Hockey Club

==== Women ====
- Chinese Women's Ice Hockey League (WCIHL) (2023)

=== Chinese Taipei ===
==== Professional ====
- Chinese Taipei Ice Hockey League

==== Minor professional ====
- Zhong Zheng Cup

==== Semi-pro and amateur ====
- Qing Nian Cup

=== Hong Kong ===
==== Professional ====
- Hockey Night in Hong Kong

==== Minor professional ====
- Hong Kong National League

==== Semi-pro and amateur ====
- Hockey Night in Hong Kong D2
- Hong Kong Amateur Hockey League

=== India ===
- Indian Ice Hockey Championship (c. 2005)

=== Indonesia ===
- Indonesia Ice Hockey League

=== Iran ===
- Iran Ice Hockey League

=== Israel ===
==== Professional ====
- Israel Elite Hockey League (IEHL) (2020)

==== Minor professional ====
- Israel National Hockey League

==== Semi-pro and amateur ====
- Israel National Hockey League D2

=== Japan ===
==== Men ====
===== Minor professional =====
- All-Japan Ice hockey Championship (1930)

===== Semi-pro and amateur =====
- J-Ice League North
- All-Japan Ice hockey Championship Division B
- IJ League - multinational league with teams in China
- J-Ice League West

==== Women ====
- All-Japan Women's Ice Hockey Championship (1982) – amateur cup tournament
- Women's Japan Ice Hockey League (WJIHL) (2012)

==== Defunct ====
- Japan Ice Hockey League (1966–2004) – replaced by Asia League

=== Kazakhstan ===
- Pro Hokei Ligasy (1992) – Uzbekistan have previously participated

=== Kuwait ===
- Kuwait Ice Hockey League (KIHL) (c. 2016) – multinational league with teams from Bahrain and Kuwait

=== Kyrgyzstan ===
- Kyrgyzstan Championship

=== Malaysia ===
==== Professional ====
- MIHF Premier League

==== Minor professional ====
- Kuala Lumpur Hockey League

==== Semi-pro and amateur ====
- MIHF Top League

=== Mongolia ===
- Mongolia Hockey League

=== North Korea ===
- North Korean Championship

=== Pakistan ===
- Pakistan Ice Hockey Championship

=== Philippines ===
- Philippine Ice Hockey League

=== Qatar ===
==== Professional ====
- Qatar International Ice Hockey League

==== Minor professional ====
- Qatar International Ice Hockey League D2

=== Singapore ===
- Singapore National Ice Hockey League

=== South Korea ===
==== Minor professional ====
- Korea Domestic Championship

==== Semi-pro and amateur ====
- Korea Premier Ice Hockey League

=== Thailand ===
==== Professional ====
- Siam Hockey League

==== Minor professional ====
- Bangkok Ice Hockey League

=== Turkey ===
==== Men ====
===== Professional =====
- Türkiye InterCity Super Lig

===== Minor professional =====
- Türkiye Birinci Lig

==== Women ====
- Turkish Women's Ice Hockey League (2007)

=== Turkmenistan ===
- Turkmenistan Championship (2013)

=== United Arab Emirates ===
==== Professional ====
- Emirates Ice Hockey League

==== Minor professional ====
- Cyber Hockey League

==== Semi-pro and amateur ====
- Galaxy Hockey League

=== Uzbekistan ===
- Uzbekistan Championship

== Europe ==
=== Multinational ===
- Alps Hockey League (2016) – multinational league with teams from Austria, Croatia, Italy, and Slovenia
- Central European Hockey League (2015) – multinational professional league with teams from Belgium, Germany and the Netherlands
- Champions Hockey League (2013) – multinational tournament featuring top teams from first-tier leagues across Europe, organized by the IIHF
- Erste Liga (2008; formerly MOL Liga) – multinational league with teams from Hungary and Romania; teams from Serbia and Slovakia have previously participated
- European Women's Hockey League (EWHL) (2004) – multinational semi-pro league with teams from Austria, Hungary, Italy, Kazakhstan, Poland, and Slovakia; teams from Belarus, Croatia, the Czech Republic, Denmark, Germany, the Netherlands, and Slovenia have previously participated
- German Women's Ice Hockey League (DFEL) (1988) – multinational league with teams from Germany and the Netherlands
- ICE Hockey League (2005) – multinational league with teams from Austria, Hungary, Italy, and Slovenia
- International Hockey League (IntHL) (2017) – multinational league with teams from Croatia, Serbia and Slovenia
- Kontinental Hockey League (KHL) (2008) – multinational professional league with teams from Belarus, China, Kazakhstan, and Russia; teams from the Czech Republic, Croatia, Finland, Latvia, Slovakia, and Ukraine have previously participated
- Optibet Hokeja Liga (2018) – multinational professional league with teams from Estonia, Latvia and Lithuania
- Pan-Hellenic Series – multinational professional league with teams from Cyprus and Greece

==== Defunct ====
- Alpenliga (1991–1999) – multinational league with teams from Austria, Italy and Slovenia
- Balkan League (1994–1997) – multinational league with teams from Bulgaria, Romania, and Serbia and Montenegro
- Baltic League (2000–01) – single-season multinational league with teams from Estonia, Latvia, and Lithuania
- Carpathian League (1997–98) – single-season multinational league with teams from Croatia, Hungary, Poland, Serbia, and Slovakia
- Champions Hockey League (2008–09) – single-instance, multinational tournament featuring top teams from the Czech Republic, Finland, Germany, Russia, Slovakia, Sweden, and Switzerland, organized by the IIHF
- Eastern European Hockey League (1995–2005) – multinational league with teams from Belarus, Latvia, Lithuania, Poland, Russia, and Ukraine
- Interliga (1999–2007) – multinational professional league with teams from Austria, Croatia, Hungary, Poland, Serbia, Slovakia, and Slovenia; also known as the International Ice Hockey League
- Inter-National League (2012–2016) – multinational league with teams from Austria, Italy, and Slovenia
- North Sea Cup (2010–2012) – multinational professional league with teams from Belgium and the Netherlands; temporary successor of the Eredivisie
- Panonian League (2002–2004, 2007–2009) – multinational league with teams from Croatia, Hungary, Romania, and Serbia
- Slohokej League (2009–2012) – multinational league with teams from Austria, Croatia, Serbia, and Slovenia

=== Austria ===
==== Men ====
- ICE Hockey League (1923; formerly Austrian Hockey League) – only Austrian teams participated prior to 2005; multinational league since 2005
- Austrian Oberliga (1968)

==== Women ====
- Women's Ice Hockey Bundesliga (DEBL) (1998)

==== Defunct ====
- Austrian National League (1959–2012)

=== Belarus ===
- Belarusian Extraleague (1993)

=== Belgium ===
==== Men ====
- BeNe League (2015) – multinational professional league with teams from the Netherlands and Belgium

==== Defunct ====
- Belgian Hockey League (1912–2015) – merged with Eredivisie to form the BeNe League

=== Bosnia and Herzegovina ===
- Bosnia and Herzegovina Hockey League (BHHL) (2002)

=== Bulgaria ===
==== Men ====
- Bulgarian Hockey League (1952)

==== Women ====
- Bulgarian Women's Hockey League

=== Croatia ===
- Croatian Ice Hockey League (1991)

=== Czech Republic ===
==== Men ====
- Czech Extraliga (1993; Czech successor of the Czechoslovak First Ice Hockey League (1931–1993))
- MAXA Liga (1993; formerly Czech 1.liga)
- Czech 2.liga (1993)
- Krajska Hokejova liga
- Krajske Souteze Muzu
- Pražské Ligy Ledního Hokeje
- CCM liga

==== Women ====
- Czech Women's Extraliga (1989; formerly 1. liga ženského hokeje, 1989–2017)

=== Denmark ===
==== Men ====
- Metal Ligaen (1954; also known as Superisligaen)

==== Women ====
- KvindeLigaen (1989; also known as DM i ishockey for kvinder)

=== Estonia ===
- Meistriliiga (EML) (1934; also known as Coolbet Hokiliiga)

=== Finland ===
==== Men ====
- Liiga (1975; formerly SM-liiga, 1975–2013)
- Mestis (2000)
- Suomi-sarja
- II-Divisioona
- III-Divisioona
- IV-Divisioona

Defunct

- SM-sarja (1928–1975)
- I-Divisioona (1974–2000)

==== Women ====
- Naisten Liiga (NSML) (1982; previously called Naisten SM-sarja (NSMs), 1982–2017)
- Naisten Mestis (2006; formerly Naisten I-divisoona, 2006–2012)
- Naisten Suomi-sarja

=== France ===
==== Men ====
- Ligue Magnus (1906)
- FFHG Division 1 (1930)
- FFHG Division 2 (1973)
- FFHG Division 3 (1986)

==== Women ====
- FFHG Féminin Élite (1986)

=== Georgia ===
- Georgian Ice Hockey League (2007)

=== Germany ===
==== Men ====
===== Professional =====
- Deutsche Eishockey Liga (DEL) (1994; also known as German Ice Hockey League)

===== Minor professional =====
- DEL2 (2013)

===== Semi-pro =====
- Oberliga (1948)

===== Amateur =====
- Bavarian ice hockey leagues (1976)
- Regionalliga (1961)

==== Women ====
- German Women's Ice Hockey League (DFEL) (1988)

==== Defunct ====
- Eishockey-Bundesliga (1958–1994) – replaced by DEL
- 2nd Bundesliga (1973–2013) – replaced by DEL2

=== Greece ===
- Greek Ice Hockey Championship (1989)

=== Hungary ===
- OB I Bajnokság (1937)

=== Iceland ===
==== Men ====
- Icelandic Men's Hockey League (1991)

==== Women ====
- Icelandic Women's Hockey League (2000)

=== Ireland ===
==== Defunct ====
- Irish Ice Hockey League (2007–2010)

=== Italy ===
==== Men ====
===== Semi-pro =====
- Italian Hockey League - Serie A (1925; formerly Serie A, Elite.A, and Serie A1) – teams also compete in the Alps Hockey League
- Italian Hockey League (1934; formerly Serie B, Seconda Divisione, and Serie A2)

===== Amateur =====
- Italian Hockey League - Division I (2004; formerly Serie C)

==== Women ====
- Italian Hockey League Women (IHLW) (1990; formerly Serie A)

=== Latvia ===
==== Men ====
- Latvian Hockey Higher League (1931; also known as Optibet Hockey League)

===== Amateur =====
- Independent Amateur Hockey League (1996)

=== Lithuania ===
- Lithuania Hockey League (2010)

=== Luxembourg ===
==== Defunct ====
- Luxembourg Championship (1993–2003)

=== The Netherlands ===
==== Men ====
===== Professional =====
- BeNe League (2015) - multinational professional league with teams from the Netherlands and Belgium

===== Semi-pro =====
- Eerste Divisie

==== Defunct ====
- Eredivisie (1945–2015) – merged with Belgian Hockey League to form the BeNe League

=== Norway ===
- EliteHockey Ligaen (1934)
- 1. divisjon (1990)
- 2. divisjon (c. 2009)

=== Poland ===
- Polska Hokej Liga (2013) – successor of Ekstraklasa (1926–1999) and Polska Liga Hokejowa (1999–2013)
- Polish 1. Liga (1956)

=== Romania ===
- Romanian Hockey League (1925)

=== Russia ===
==== Men ====
===== Major professional =====
- Kontinental Hockey League (KHL) (2008) – multinational professional league with teams from Belarus, China, Kazakhstan, and Russia; teams from the Czech Republic, Croatia, Finland, Latvia, Slovakia, and Ukraine have previously participated

===== Minor professional =====
- Supreme Hockey League (VHL) (2010)

===== Semi-pro =====
- Supreme Hockey League B (VHL-B) (2011)

===== Junior =====
- Junior Hockey League (MHL) (2009; sometimes translated as Minor Hockey League or Youth Hockey League)
- National Junior Hockey League (NMHL) (2011; formerly Junior Hockey League Division B)

===== Youth =====
- Moscow Region
- Ural Region

==== Women ====
- Zhenskaya Hockey League (ZhHL) (2015)

==== Defunct ====
- Russian Superleague (RSL) (1996–2008) – replaced by Kontinental Hockey League
- International Hockey League (1992–1996) – successor of the Soviet Championship League; replaced by Russian Superleague
- Russian Major League (RUS-2) (1992–2010; also known as Vysshaya Liga) – replaced by Supreme Hockey League B
- Russian Second League (1996–2009)

=== Serbia ===
- Serbian Hockey League (2006)

=== Slovakia ===
==== Men ====
- Slovak Extraliga (1993; also known as Tipsport Liga) – Slovak successor of the Czechoslovak First Ice Hockey League (1931–1993)
- Slovenská hokejová liga (1993; formerly 1. hokejová liga SR (lit. 'Slovak Republic 1. Hockey League'), 1993–2016; Budiš 1. hokejová liga SR, 2016–17; and St. Nicolaus 1. hokejová liga SR, 2017–2019)
- Slovak 2. Liga (1993)

==== Women ====
- Slovak Women's Extraliga (1991)

=== Slovenia ===
- Slovenian Ice Hockey League (1991)

=== Spain ===
==== Men ====
- Liga Nacional de Hockey Hielo (LNHH) (1972)

==== Women ====
- Liga Nacional de Hockey Hielo Femenino (LNHHF) (2007)

=== Sweden ===
==== Men ====
===== Major professional =====
- Swedish Hockey League (SHL) (1975; formerly Elitserien, 1975–2013)

===== Minor professional =====
- HockeyAllsvenskan (1999; formerly Allsvenskan, 1948–1975, and SuperAllsvenskan, 2000–2005)

===== Semi-pro =====
- Hockeyettan (1944; formerly Division I)

===== Amateur =====
- Hockeytvåan (1941)
- Hockeytrean (1999)
- Hockeyfyran
- Division 5
- Division 6 (2015)

===== Junior and youth =====
- J20 Nationell (1994; formerly J20 SuperElit, 1994–2020)
- J20 Region (1980; formerly J20 Elit, 1980–2020)
- J18 Nationell (1992; formerly J18 Allsvenskan, 1992–2020)
- J18 Region (1979; formerly J18 Elit, 1979–2020)

==== Women ====
- Swedish Women's Hockey League (SDHL) (2007; formerly Riksserien, 2007–2016)
- Nationella Damhockeyligan (NDHL) (2007; formerly Division I, 2007–2015, and Damettan, 2015–2021)

=== Switzerland ===
==== Men ====
===== Professional =====
- National League (1908)

===== Minor professional =====
- Swiss League (1947)

===== Semi-pro =====
- MyHockey League

===== Amateur =====
  - 1. Amateur Regio League
  - 2. Amateur Regio League
  - 3. Amateur Regio League
  - 4. Amateur Regio League
  - Ligue Lausannoise

==== Women ====
- Women's League (SWHL A) (1986; formerly Leistungsklasse A (LKA), 1986–2014, and Swiss Women's Hockey League A, 2014–2019)

=== Ukraine ===
- Ukrainian Hockey Championship (1992), reformed from the Ukrainian SSR republican competition within the Soviet Union (1941/1948 – 1991)

==== Defunct ====
- Ukrainian Hockey League (2016–2021)
- Major League (1992–2011)
- Professional Hockey League (2011–2013)
- Ukrainian Hockey Extra League (2015–2016)

=== United Kingdom ===
==== Men ====
===== Professional =====
- Elite Ice Hockey League (EIHL; 2003)

===== Semi-pro and amateur =====
- National Ice Hockey League (1996)
- Scottish National League (1930)

==== Women ====
- WNIHL Elite Division (2015)
- WNIHL 1 (1989)
- WNIHL 2 (1992)
  - North
  - South
- WNIHL U16 (2007)

Source: EIHA

==== University ====
- British Universities Ice Hockey Association (BUIHA) (2003)

==== Defunct leagues ====
- British National League (1954–1960)
- British National League (1996–2005)
- Ice Hockey Superleague (1996–2003)
- British Hockey League (1982–1996)
- English Premier Ice Hockey League (1997–2017)

=== Former nations ===
==== Czechoslovakia ====
- Czechoslovak First Ice Hockey League (1936–1993)

==== East Germany ====
- DDR-Oberliga (1949–1990)

==== Soviet Union ====
- Soviet Championship League (1946–1992; final season played as the CIS Championship, 1991–92)

==== West Germany ====
- Eishockey-Bundesliga (1958–1994; called Oberliga, 1948–1958)

==== Yugoslavia ====
- Yugoslav Ice Hockey League (1936–1991)

== Oceania ==
=== Australia ===
==== Men ====
===== Professional =====
- Australian Ice Hockey League (2000)

===== Minor professional =====
- Ice Hockey Victoria Premier League

===== Semi-pro and amateur =====
- Ice Hockey Western Australia Premier League
- Ice Hockey South Australia Premier League
- East Coast Super League (2002)

===== Junior =====
- Australian Junior Ice Hockey League (2012)

==== Women ====
- Australian Women's Ice Hockey League (AWIHL) (2005)

=== New Zealand ===
==== Men ====
- New Zealand Ice Hockey League (2005)

==== Women ====
- New Zealand Women's Ice Hockey League (NZWIHL) (2014)

== Disabled hockey leagues ==
Leagues for disabled hockey players:

- American Amputee Hockey Association (AAHA)
- American Hearing Impaired Hockey Association
- Ice sledge hockey

== Bibliography ==
- "Hockey League Pages". Elite Prospects.
- Biller, Philippe. "Archives - Hockey sur glace". HockeyArchives.info (in French).
