= College Hockey Association =

- Sport: Ice hockey
- Founded: 2004
- No. of teams: 10
- Headquarters: Pittsburgh, PA
- Region: Northeast United States

The College Hockey Association (CHA) is a collegiate club ice hockey league that comprises smaller colleges and universities and community colleges in Western Pennsylvania and Western New York. Every player in the CHA maintains the academic standards of at least the ACHA D-III level. However, membership into the ACHA is optional for CHA members. The league is operated and run by College Hockey East, and is most commonly known as the third tier of the Open League.

== CHA Champions ==
- 2010-11: St. John Fisher College
- 2009-10: Canisius College
- 2008-09: Canisius College
- 2007-08: Hilbert College
- 2006-07: Hilbert College
- 2005-06: Youngstown State University
- 2004-05: CCAC-North

== Teams ==
North Division

- D'youville College
- Gannon University
- Fredonia State University (Team 2)
- Medaille College
- Penn State Behrend (Team 2)

South Division

- Carnegie Mellon University (Team 2)
- University of Pittsburgh at Greensburg
- California University of PA (Team 2)
- Case Western Reserve University

== Former Teams ==
- St. John Fisher College
- Canisius College
- Allegheny College
- Hilbert College
- Youngstown State University

== See also ==
- American Collegiate Hockey Association
- List of ice hockey leagues
