= Mason-Dixon Collegiate Hockey Association =

- Association: American Collegiate Hockey Association
- Sport: Ice hockey
- Founded: 1991
- No. of teams: 9
- Country: United States
- Region: Mid-Atlantic

The Mason-Dixon Collegiate Hockey Association (MDCHA) is an ACHA Division III club ice hockey league that comprises smaller colleges and universities in the Mid-Atlantic region USA. Division III club hockey offers smaller colleges and universities the opportunity to field competitive hockey teams without the financial burden of higher divisions or NCAA levels.

== History ==
- Loyola University Maryland, 2006-07 season's champion, left the conference for the 2007-08 season, while Alvernia University and Bucknell University joined the league.
- Catholic University, 2008-09 season's champion, leaves the conference to join Blue Ridge Hockey Conference, while runner-up Alvernia University also moves from MDCHA to the Delaware Valley Collegiate Hockey Conference.
- University of Maryland, College Park club ice hockey joined MDCHA for the 2009-2010 season. The team left the conference for the 2011-12 season.
- Wesley College in Delaware and Susquehanna University are added to the MDCHA for the 2010-11 season. Montgomery College suspends their team and DeSales University is added as a probationary member, playing a limited league schedule.
- Penn State Harrisburg is added for the 2011-2012 season.

== Current teams ==
- American University
- DeSales University probationary
- Dickinson College
- Gettysburg College
- Johns Hopkins University
- Montgomery College suspended
- Mount St. Mary's University
- Susquehanna University
- Wesley College
- Penn State Harrisburg

== Championship games ==
Year	Champion	Runner-Up	Score
2012-13	American University	Johns Hopkins University	6-3
2011-12	American University	Wesley College	4-1
2010-11	University of Maryland	Gettysburg College	5-4 (OT)
2009-10	Dickinson College	Gettysburg College	5-3
2008-09	Catholic University	Alvernia University	2-1
2007-08	Gettysburg College	Alvernia University	4-3
2006-07	Loyola University Maryland	Gettysburg College	8-6
2006-05	George Washington University	Loyola University Maryland	7-2

== See also ==
- American Collegiate Hockey Association
- List of ice hockey leagues
