= North Central Collegiate Hockey Association =

- Formerly: Great Plains Collegiate Hockey Association
- Association: ACHA
- Sport: Ice hockey
- Founded: 1993
- No. of teams: 10
- Headquarters: Sioux Center, Iowa
- Region: Colorado, Nebraska, Iowa, South Dakota, Wyoming

North Central Collegiate Hockey Association (NCCHA) was an ACHA Division III ice hockey league comprising smaller colleges and universities in Western and Northern Plains portions of the United States.

== History ==
The NCCHA began in 2008, and was made up of teams from the defunct Great Plains Collegiate Hockey Association which was in existence since 1993 and the addition of some independent schools from ACHA Division 3 Pacific Region. The conference only lasted a few seasons.

== Teams ==
- Air Force Academy
- Colorado College
- Creighton University
- Dordt College
- Iowa State University
- Colorado Mesa University
- University of Nebraska–Lincoln
- University of South Dakota
- South Dakota State University
- University of Wyoming

== Champions ==
- 2010 Iowa State University
- 2009 Dordt College

== See also ==
- American Collegiate Hockey Association
- List of ice hockey leagues
