= Northeast Collegiate Hockey Association =

- Conference: ACHA
- Founded: 1982
- Commissioner: William S. Dow
- Sports fielded: Men's ice hockey
- Division: Division II & Division III
- No. of teams: 34
- Headquarters: Keene, New Hampshire
- Region: Northeast
- Most recent champions: Patriot: UMass; American: Bentley; Colonial: Coast Guard
- Website: https://nechahockey.com/

The Northeast Collegiate Hockey Association (NECHA) is a non-varsity (club) college ice hockey league in the Northeast region of the United States that competes with Divisions II and III of the American Collegiate Hockey Association (ACHA). Most NECHA member schools have varsity teams that are affiliated with the Eastern College Athletic Conference (ECAC) or the Hockey East Association and most teams receive at least partial funding from their school's athletic departments and/or student government.

== Format ==
The NECHA league comprises four-year post-secondary college and university teams separated into three conferences: Patriot, American, and Colonial. The Patriot and American conferences compete under Division II of the ACHA and the Colonial competes under Division III.

Each league conference consists of two divisions organized geographically by school location. Teams play a minimum of ten league games during the regular season. Following the regular season, the NECHA league hosts their annual championship playoffs for each conference with invitations to the top teams in the regular season standings.

Associate and Probationary Members are recognized teams but are not full members of the league and are not eligible for the NECHA regular season championship, the NECHA league playoffs, and do not vote on actions at official league meetings.

== Current members ==
=== Patriot Conference East ===
School	Location	Nickname	Primary conference	Website	Team colors
Boston College	Chestnut Hill, MA	Eagles	ACC (DI)		
Boston University	Boston, MA	Terriers	Patriot (DI)		
Bryant University	Smithfield, RI	Bulldogs	NEC (DI)		
Merrimack College	North Andover, MA	Warriors	NE10 (DII)		
Northeastern University	Boston, MA	Huskies	CAA (DI)		
Providence College	Providence, RI	Friars	Big East (DI)		

=== Patriot Conference West ===
School	Location	Nickname	Primary conference	Website	Team colors
College of the Holy Cross	Worcester, MA	Crusaders	Patriot (DI)		
Keene State College	Keene, NH	Owls	LEC (DIII)		
University of Connecticut	Storrs, CT	Huskies	Big East (DI)		
University of Massachusetts Amherst	Amherst, MA	Minutemen	A10 (DI)		
University of Vermont	Burlington, VT	Catamounts	AEC (DI)		

=== American Conference North ===
School	Location	Nickname	Primary conference	Website	Team colors
Dartmouth College	Hanover, NH	Big Green	Ivy (DI)		
Harvard University	Cambridge, MA	Crimson	Ivy (DI)		
Massachusetts Institute of Technology	Cambridge, MA	Engineers	NEWMAC (DIII)		
Norwich University	Northfield, VT	Cadets	GNAC (DIII)		
Saint Anselm College	Goffstown, NH	Hawks	NE10 (DII)		
Southern New Hampshire University	Manchester, NH	Penmen	NE10 (DII)		
University of Massachusetts Lowell	Lowell, MA	River Hawks	AEC (DI)		

=== American Conference South ===
School	Location	Nickname	Primary conference	Website	Team colors
Bentley University	Waltham, MA	Falcons	NE10 (DII)		
Bridgewater State University	Bridgewater, MA	Bears	ECAC (DIII)		
Connecticut College	New London, CT	Camels	NESCAC (DII)		
Eastern Connecticut State University	Willimantic, CT	Warriors	LEC (DIII)		
Roger Williams University	Bristol, RI	Hawks	CCC (DIII)		
Westfield State University	Westfield, MA	Owls	MASCAC (DIII)		

=== Colonial Conference North ===
School	Location	Nickname	Primary conference	Website	Team colors
Bates College	Lewiston, ME	Bobcats	NESCAC (DIII)		
Colby-Sawyer College	New London, NH	Chargers	NAC (DIII)		
Thomas College	Waterville, ME	Terriers	NAC (DIII)		
University of New England	Biddeford, ME	Nor'easters	CCC (DIII)		

=== Colonial Conference South ===
School	Location	Nickname	Primary conference	Website	Team colors
Massachusetts Institute of Technology	Cambridge, MA	Engineers	NEWMAC (DIII)		
Springfield College	Springfield, MA	Pride	NEWMAC (DIII)		
United States Coast Guard Academy	New London, CT	Bears	NEWMAC (DIII)		
University of Connecticut (Blue)	Storrs, CT	Huskies	Big East (DI)		
University of New Haven	West Haven, CT	Chargers	NE10 (DII)		
Worcester Polytechnic Institute	Worcester, MA	Engineers	NEWMAC (DIII)		

=== Other members ===
NECHA Probationary Members

- Saint Joseph's College of Maine

NECHA Associate Members

- Gordon College
- Trinity College
- Tufts University
- University of Maine
- Wentworth Institute of Technology

Note: Boston College, Boston University, College of the Holy Cross, University of Connecticut, Harvard University, Merrimack College, Northeastern University, University of Maine, University of Massachusetts Amherst, University of Massachusetts Lowell and University of Vermont have NCAA varsity hockey programs at NCAA Division I level.

Saint Anselm College and Southern New Hampshire University have varsity hockey at the NCAA Division II level.

Norwich University, Connecticut College, Trinity College, Tufts University, University of New England, and Westfield State University have varsity hockey at the NCAA Division III level.

== See also ==
- American Collegiate Hockey Association
- List of ice hockey leagues
