= Mid-American Collegiate Hockey Association =

Club hockey league in the Midwestern US

- Conference: ACHA
- Founded: Late 1990s
- Commissioner: Cody Blevins
- Sports fielded: Men's ice hockey
- Division: Division II & Division III
- No. of teams: 27
- Headquarters: Peoria, Illinois
- Region: Midwest and Great Lakes
- Website: Official website

The Mid-American Collegiate Hockey Association (MACHA) is an ACHA club hockey league comprising colleges and universities in the Midwest.

== Organizational structure ==
Former conference logo.

The MACHA is made up of three divisions, Gold, Silver, and Bronze. The Gold Division is made up of ten members. The Silver Division is made up of 13 members and is split up into two conferences, the North and West. The Bronze Division is made up of five members. Each division conducts its own playoffs. Some schools field multiple teams in different conference divisions.

== Gold Division ==
The Gold Division of the MACHA is made up of teams from the Central Region of ACHA Division 2.These teams include Southern Illinois University of Edwardsville, University of Missouri, Illinois State University, University of Illinois, University of Iowa, Maryville University, University of Nebraska, and University of Arkasas. The top teams usually include Maryville University, University of Iowa, and the University of Arkansas. Teams that have recently dropped or dispanded from MACHA Division 2 have been Bradley University, McKendree University, Saint Louis University, Northern Illinois University, and Iowa State University.

Institution	Location	Founded	Affiliation	Enrollment	Nickname	Colors	Website
University of Illinois	Urbana, IL	1867	Public	45,813	Fighting Illini		
Illinois State University	Normal, IL	1857	Public	20,784	Redbirds		
University of Iowa	Iowa City, IA	1847	Public	33,334	Hawkeyes		
University of Missouri	Columbia, MO	1839	Public	30,870	Tigers		
Southern Illinois University-Edwardsville	Edwardsville, IL	1957	Public	14,142	Cougars		
University of Arkansas	Fayetteville, AR	1871	Public	27,434	Razorbacks		[6]
Maryville University	St. Louis, MO	1872	Private	7,815	Saints		[5]

=== Gold Division Champions ===
- 2026- Maryville
- 2025- Arkansas
- 2024- Iowa
- 2023- Iowa
- 2022- Iowa
- 2021- N/A (COVID)
- 2020- Iowa
- 2019- McKendree
- 2018- McKendree
- 2017- McKendree
- 2016- Southern Illinois-Edwardsville
- 2015- Missouri State
- 2014- Missouri State
- 2013- Southern Illinois-Edwardsville
- 2012- Missouri
- 2011- St. Louis
- 2010- Southern Illinois-Edwardsville
- 2009- Missouri
- 2008- Missouri State
- 2007- Missouri State
- 2006- Southern Illinois-Edwardsville
- 2005- Southern Illinois-Edwardsville
- 2004- Southern Illinois-Edwardsville
- 2003- Southern Illinois-Edwardsville

== Silver Division ==
The Silver Division is made up of teams from the Pacific Region of ACHA Division 3.

=== North Conference ===
Institution	Location	Founded	Affiliation	Enrollment	Nickname	Colors	Website
Aurora University	Aurora, IL	1893	Private	5,500	Spartans		
Loyola University Chicago	Chicago, IL	1870	Private	16,422	Ramblers		
McKendree University	Lebanon, IL	1828	Private	2,937	Bearcats		
University of Wisconsin-Milwaukee	Milwaukee, WI	1956	Public	26,037	Panthers		
Northwestern University	Evanston, IL	1851	Private	21,208	Wildcats		
Robert Morris University-Peoria	Peoria, IL	1965	Private	4,500	Eagles		

=== West Conference ===
Institution	Location	Founded	Affiliation	Enrollment	Nickname	Colors	Website
Creighton University	Omaha, NE	1878	Private	8,435	Blue Jays		
Dordt University	Sioux Center, IA	1955	Private	1,581	Defenders		
Missouri State University	Springfield, MO	1906	Public	23,537	Ice Bears		
University of Nebraska–Lincoln	Lincoln, NE	1869	Public	25,260	Huskers		
University of Wisconsin-Platteville	Platteville, WI	1866	Public	8,712	Pioneers		

=== Silver Division Champions ===
The MACHA Silver Division has sent several teams to the ACHA Division 3 National Tournament the past few years. The most notable finish was Iowa State in 2012. As the #3 seed from the Pacific Region they won their pool to reach the National semifinals where they lost to eventual champion Adrian College.

- 2026- Dordt
- 2025- Dordt
- 2024- Missouri
- 2023- Missouri
- 2022- Arkansas
- 2021- N/A (COVID)
- 2020- Kansas
- 2019- Nebraska
- 2018- Nebraska
- 2017- Iowa State
- 2016- Marquette
- 2015- Marquette
- 2014- Wisconsin-Platteville
- 2013- Wisconsin-Platteville
- 2012- Robert Morris-Peoria
- 2011- Bradley
- 2010- Missouri State
- 2009- McKendree
- 2008- Mckendree
- 2007- Illinois State
- 2006- Depaul
- 2005- Iowa

=== Silver Division Nationals Teams ===
The MACHA Silver Division has sent several teams to the ACHA Division 3 National Tournament the past few years. The MACHA has had two teams advance to the semifinals. The first was in 2012 when Iowa State, the #3 seed from the Pacific Region, lost to the eventual champion Adrian College. The second was in 2014 when Robert Morris-White, the #4 seed from the Pacific Region, lost to the eventual champion Adrian College. Because Davenport forfeited the 3rd place game Robert Morris was awarded 3rd place.

2019 Host City: Dallas, TX

- Milwaukee (Finished 12th)
- Nebraska (Finished 15th)

2014 Host City: Coral Springs, FL

- Robert Morris-White (Finished 3rd)

2013 Host City: Springfield, MO

- Marquette (Finished 10th)
- Iowa State (Finished 15th)

2012 Host City: Vineland, NJ

- Iowa State (Finished 4th)

2011 Host City: Holland, MI

- McKendree (Finished 13th)

== Bronze Division ==
The Bronze Division is made up of teams from the Pacific Region of ACHA Division 3.

Institution	Location	Founded	Affiliation	Enrollment	Nickname	Colors	Website
Bradley University	Peoria, IL	1897	Private	5,300	Braves		
Northern Illinois University	DeKalb, IL	1895	Public	20,015	Huskies		
Robert Morris University-White	Chicago, IL	1965	Private	4,500	Eagles		
Southern Illinois University-Edwardsville	Edwardsville, IL	1957	Public	14,142	Cougars		
Washington University in St. Louis	St. Louis, MO	1853	Private	15,155	Bears		None
Wheaton College	Wheaton, IL	1860	Private	3,810	Thunder		None

=== Bronze Division Champions ===
- 2018- McKendree
- 2017- Northern Illinois
- 2016- Northern Illinois
- 2015- Northern Illinois
- 2012- Robert Morris University Peoria

== See also ==
- American Collegiate Hockey Association
- List of ice hockey leagues
