= Ligue Interzone de hockey mineur BC Rive Nord =

Ligue Interzone de hockey mineur BC Rive Nord is an ice hockey league, based in the Quebec Metropolitan Area. It regroups many levels of hockey from Atom to Junior. It has two junior levels, Junior "A" (Junior "C" Canada-Wide) and Junior "B" (Junior "D" Canada-Wide).

As of 2026, the league president is Claire Chouinard.

== List of common cities/teams in the Junior leagues ==
Beauport (Éperviers, Faucons, Harfangs)
Charlesbourg (Caribous, Élans)
Québec (Béliers, Boucs, Montcalm, Patriotes, Radisson)
Sainte-Foy/Sillery (Gouverneurs)
Ancienne-Lorette (Mustang)
Valcartier/Val-Bélair (Chevaliers)
Cap-Rouge/Saint-Augustin-de-Desmaures (Royaux)
Donnacona/Pont-Rouge (Diablos)
Saint-Raymond (Lynx)
Montmagny (Alliés)
Bellechasse (Sénateurs)
Lévis (Commandeurs)
Chaudière-Etchemins (Éclaireurs)
Chaudière-Ouest (Husky)
Beauce-Nord (Rapides)
Lotbinière (Seigneurs)
Côte-de-Beaupré/Île d'Orléans (-)
