= Empire Collegiate Hockey Conference =

- Current season, competition or edition: 2026-27
- Sport: Ice hockey
- Founded: 2009
- First season: 2009–10
- Commissioner: Devin Bertrand
- Sports fielded: Men's ice hockey
- Division: American Collegiate Hockey Association – M3
- No. of teams: 7
- Region: Northeast
- Most recent champion: Farmingdale State College (DIII) (2025-26)
- Most titles: Farmingdale State College (DI) (9)
- Streaming partner: LI Sports Network
- Website: https://www.echchockey.com/

The Empire Collegiate Hockey Conference (ECHC) is a collegiate hockey conference that plays in Division III and the American Collegiate Development Conference of the American Collegiate Hockey Conference (ACHA). The Conference was established in May 2009, when University of Albany, Farmingdale State College, Hofstra University, Union College, Skidmore College, Southern Connecticut State, Siena College and Fairfield University set out to establish an organization.

Since 2009, the ECHC has seen various esteemed institutions join and depart, each contributing to the rich legacy of the conference. The inaugural 2009–10 season saw the University of Albany, Farmingdale State College, Hofstra University, Union College, Skidmore College, Southern Connecticut State University, Siena College, and Fairfield University laying the foundation. Union College and Skidmore College exited after the first season, while Wagner College joined in 2011–12 but departed after a single season. SUNY Maritime became a key member from 2013–14 until 2016–17, and Quinnipiac University joined in 2015–16, becoming a mainstay.

In the fall of 2019, the Empire Collegiate Hockey Conference welcomed Ramapo College of New Jersey, Hofstra University, Fordham University, and Stony Brook University, solidifying the conference as the premier conference in the Collegiate Hockey Federation. The spring of 2022 saw the ECHC expand its ranks with the addition of the University of New Haven, Sacred Heart University, and Farmingdale State College's (DIII) team. This expansion, and the unwavering goal of creating the most dynamic hockey experience for their members, led the Empire to create a second division to ensure competitive balance and integrity. In February 2023, the ECHC crowned two conference champions for the very first time. Farmingdale State College (DIII) captured the Black Division championship, beating the University of New Haven in the finals, and Ramapo College of New Jersey overcame Fairfield University, thanks to an overtime game-winning goal by Christopher Dressler.

During the offseason, AAU College Hockey announced their Inaugural DI season, and named Farmingdale State College, Fairfield University, Quinnipiac University, University of Delaware, and Fordham University as organizations that met the qualifications to be considered DI teams.

The most recent 2023–24 season continued the trend of growth and excellence with the addition of Rutgers University (DII), bringing with it a new level of competition and excitement. NYCHC (Columbia University) also joined the fold, further enriching the landscape of collegiate hockey within the Empire Collegiate Hockey Conference. Fairfield University expanded its participation by adding a Division III team, underscoring the conference's commitment to growth and diversity within its ranks.

The 2024–25 season marked the Empire Collegiate Hockey Conference's 15th anniversary, a milestone celebrated with 15 member teams, including the newly welcomed Stevens Institute of Technology. The season also featured a new division realignment, with the Purple Division consisting of the University of Delaware, Farmingdale State College (DI), Fairfield University (DI), and Quinnipiac University, all DI teams. The Black Division will comprise Farmingdale State College (DII), Ramapo College of New Jersey, Fordham University, Sacred Heart University, and Columbia University. The Silver Division will include Fairfield University (DIII), Stony Brook University, Hofstra University, the University of New Haven, Stevens Institute of Technology, and Rutgers University.

Farmingdale State College (DI) captured its ninth ECHC Conference Championship, defeating the University of Delaware in the Purple Division final. Columbia University claimed the Black Division title with a win over Farmingdale State College (DII), while Stony Brook University earned the Silver Division championship by defeating Rutgers University.

Following the conclusion of the season, it was announced that Kutztown University (DII) and Pennsylvania State University at Harrisburg (DII) would be joining the Conference for the 2025–26 season. The ECHC continues to grow as a premier destination for non-NCAA collegiate hockey, proudly representing institutions across the Northeast and Atlantic regions of the United States and Canada.

== Members ==
School	Location	Founded	Affiliation	Team Name	Colors	Joined
Columbia University	New York City, New York	1754	Private	Lions		2023
Farmingdale State College (DII)	East Farmingdale, New York	1912	Public	Rams		2022
Penn State Harrisburg	Lower Swatara Township, Pennsylvania	1966	Public	Nittany Lions		2025
Sacred Heart University (ACDC A)	Fairfield, Connecticut	1963	Private	Pioneers		2022
University of Delaware	Newark, Delaware	1743	Private	Blue Hens		2023
Ramapo College of New Jersey	Mahwah, New Jersey	1969	Public	Roadrunners		2019
University of New Haven	West Haven, Connecticut	1920	Private	Chargers		2022

== Former Members ==
School	Location	Founded	Affiliation	Nickname	Colors	Left
Siena College	Loudonville, New York	1937	Private	Saints		2010
Skidmore College	Saratoga Springs, New York	1903	Private	Thoroughbreds		2010
Union College	Schenectady, New York	1795	Private	Dutchmen		2010
Wagner College	Staten Island, New York	1883	Private	Seahawks		2012
University at Albany	Albany, NY	1844	Public	Great Danes		2016
State University of New York Maritime College	Throggs Neck, New York	1874	Public	Privateers		2017
Southern Connecticut State University	New Haven, CT	1893	Public	Owls		2022
Fairfield University (DI)	Fairfield, Connecticut	1942	Private	Stags		2025
Farmingdale State College (DI)	East Farmingdale, New York	1912	Public	Rams		2025
Quinnipiac University	Hamden, Connecticut	1929	Private	Brave		2025
Stony Brook University (M3)	Stony Brook, New York	1957	Public	Seawolves		2025
Fairfield University (M3)	Fairfield, Connecticut	1942	Private	Stags		2025
Hofstra University	Hempstead, New York	1935	Private	Pride		2025
Rutgers University (M3)	New Brunswick, New Jersey	1766	Public	Scarlet Knights		2025
Sacred Heart University (ACDC B)	Fairfield, Connecticut	1963	Private	Pioneers		2025
Stevens Institute of Technology	Hoboken, New Jersey	1870	Private	Ducks		2025
Fordham University	The Bronx, New York	1841	Private	Rams		2026
Kutztown University	Kutztown, Pennsylvania	1866	Public	Golden Bears		2026

== Champions ==
Season	Top Regular Season Record	Conference Champion
2009–10		Farmingdale State College (DI)
2010–11		Southern Connecticut State University
2011–12		Southern Connecticut State University
2012–13		Farmingdale State College (DI)
2013-14		Fairfield University (DI)
2014-15		Farmingdale State College (DI)
2015-16		Farmingdale State College (DI)
2016-17		Farmingdale State College (DI)
2017-18		Farmingdale State College (DI)
2018–19		Farmingdale State College (DI)
2019–20	Fairfield University (DI)	Fairfield University (DI)
2020-21	N/A	No Champion Awarded
2021-22	Farmingdale State College (DI)	Farmingdale State College (DI)
2022-23	Purple Division: Farmingdale State College (DI) Black Division: Farmingdale State College (DII)	Purple Division: Ramapo College of New Jersey Black Division: Farmingdale State College (DII)
2023-24	Purple Division: Farmingdale State College (DI) Black Division: Stony Brook University	Purple Division: Fairfield University (DI) Black Division: Sacred Heart University (DI)
2024-25	Purple Division: Farmingdale State College (DI) Black Division: Farmingdale State College (DII) Silver Division: Rutgers University	Purple Division: Farmingdale State College (DI) Black Division: Columbia University Silver Division: Stony Brook University
2025-26	Fordham University	Farmingdale State College (DIII)

== Awards ==
=== Coach of the Year ===
Season	Coach	Team	Division	Coach	Team	Division	Coach	Team	Division
2009–10									
2010–11									
2011–12									
2012–13									
2013-14									
2014-15									
2015-16									
2016-17									
2017-18									
2018–19									
2019–20	Lloyd Jacques	Quinnipiac University							
2020-21	N/A	N/A							
2021-22	Michael Winters	Ramapo College of New Jersey							
2022-23	Joseph Mazzie	Farmingdale State College (DI)	Purple	Albert Markopoulos	Farmingdale State College (DII)	Black			
2023-24	Joseph Mazzie	Farmingdale State College (DI)	Purple	Edward Armellino	Stony Brook University	Black			
2024-25	Joe Garrett	University of Delaware	Purple	Louis Judge	Farmingdale State College (DII)	Black	Tony Thomas	Rutgers University	Silver
2025-26	Louis Judge	Farmingdale State College (DIII)							

=== MVP ===
Season	Player	Team	Division	Player	Team	Division	Player	Team	Division
2009–10									
2010–11									
2011–12									
2012–13									
2013-14									
2014-15									
2015-16									
2016-17									
2017-18									
2018–19									
2019–20	Joey DiMartino	Farmingdale State College (DI)							
2020-21	N/A	N/A							
2021-22	Christopher Dressler	Ramapo College of New Jersey							
2022-23	Trent Shanley	Ramapo College of New Jersey	Purple	Brendan Dixson	Farmingdale State College (DII)	Black			
2023-24	Tim Duffy	Farmingdale State College (DI)	Purple	Brendan Dixson	Farmingdale State College (DII)	Black			
2024-25	Thomas Konkowski	Farmingdale State College (DI)	Purple	Brandon Avezov	Columbia University	Black	Jamie Zimmerman	Rutgers University	Silver
2025-26	Brandon Avezov	Columbia University							

=== Rookie of the Year ===
Season	Player	Team	Division	Player	Team	Division	Player	Team	Division
2009–10									
2010–11									
2011–12									
2012–13									
2013-14									
2014-15									
2015-16									
2016-17									
2017-18									
2018–19									
2019–20	Nicholas Carideo	Farmingdale State College (DI)							
2020-21	N/A	N/A							
2021-22	Thomas Moskal	Ramapo College of New Jersey							
2022-23	Teddy Valenti	Farmingdale State College (DI)	Purple	Matthew Materazo	Hofstra University	Black			
2023-24	Michael LoRicco	Farmingdale State College (DI)	Purple	Gavin Rieger	Rutgers University	Black			
2024-25	Thomas Konkowski	Farmingdale State College (DI)	Purple	Ronan Robinson	Columbia University	Black	Michael Madera	University of New Haven	Silver
2025-26	Anthony Rosa	University of New Haven							

=== Goalie of the Year ===
Season	Player	Team	Division	Player	Team	Division	Player	Team	Division
2009–10									
2010–11									
2011–12									
2012–13									
2013-14									
2014-15									
2015-16									
2016-17									
2017-18									
2018–19									
2019–20									
2020-21	N/A	N/A							
2021-22	Joseph DeCanio	Farmingdale State College (DI)							
2022-23	Jake Temkin	Farmingdale State College (DI)	Purple	Alex Fernandes	University of New Haven	Black			
2023-24	Ryan Solomon	Quinnipiac University	Purple	Gene Castro	Stony Brook University	Black			
2024-25	Andrew Barron	Farmingdale State College (DI)	Purple	Luke Richardson	Farmingdale State College (DII)	Black	Aaron Rodriguez	Rutgers University	Silver
2025-26	Daniel Gerts	Fordham University							

== Playoff bracket ==
In the "Play-In" round, (9) Kutztown University (DIII) defeated (8) Columbia University, 6-5.

Quarterfinals
1	Fordham University	7
9	Kutztown University (DIII)	1
4	University of Delaware (DIII)	3
5	Sacred Heart University (ACDC A)	7
2	Farmingdale State College (DIII)	6
7	University of New Haven	3
3	Ramapo College of New Jersey	2
6	Penn State Harrisburg	7

Semifinals
1	Fordham University	4
5	Sacred Heart University (ACDC A)	2
2	Farmingdale State College (DIII)	3
6	Penn State Harrisburg	2

Final
1	Fordham University	3
2	Farmingdale State College (DIII)	4

== See also ==
- List of ice hockey leagues
