= South African Super League =

- Current season, competition or edition: 2022 SAIHF Super League
- Sport: Ice hockey
- No. of teams: 3
- Country: South Africa
- Most recent champion: Cape Town Kings
- Most titles: Cape Town Kings (3)
- Website: stats.iihf.com/saiha/192/

The South African Super League, is a South African ice hockey league that was founded in 2016.

== Teams ==
2022 Super League Teams

Team	City	Arena	Capacity
Cape Town Kings	Cape Town	The Ice Station	1,400
Pretoria Capitals	Pretoria	Forest Hill Ice Rink & The Grove Ice Rink	1,500
Kempton Park Wildcats	Johannesburg	Festival Mall Ice Rink	1,500

== Super League seasons ==
=== Past champions ===
- 2016 Kempton Park Wildcats
- 2017 Kempton Park Wildcats
- 2018 Season not played
- 2019 Cape Town Kings
- 2020 Cancelled due to COVID-19 Pandemic
- 2021 Cancelled due to COVID-19 Pandemic
- 2022 Cape Town Kings
- 2023 Cape Town Kings
