= High school ice hockey in Washington =

Washington High School Hockey is a co-ed sport, with teams divided into two leagues, the Western Washington High School Hockey League and the Tri-Cities High School Hockey League. Both leagues are divided into a division 1 and a division 2, and play through their own regular season. At the end of the season, the division 1 champions and the division 2 champions from each league play a single game championship against each other to determine the state champions in their respective divisions.

== Western Washington High School Hockey League ==
The Western Washington High School Hockey League is made up of 12 teams (representing 20+ schools due to cooperative team arrangements) based west of the Cascade mountains. Currently, there are 5 teams in Division 1 and 7 teams in division 2.

== Tri-Cities High School Hockey league ==
The Tri-Cities high School Hockey League is made up of teams east of the cascade mountains, and is currently maintained by the Tri-Cities Amateur Hockey Association.
