= East Coast Collegiate Hockey Association =

ACHA college ice hockey conference in SE United States

- Sport: College ice hockey
- Founded: 2001
- Division: ACHA Division III
- No. of teams: 24
- Headquarters: Arlington County, Virginia, U.S.
- Region: Mid-Atlantic/Southeast
- Official website: echahockey.pointstreaksites.com/view/echahockey/

The East Coast Collegiate Hockey Association (ECCHA) was an ACHA college ice hockey conference in the Southeast region of the United States.

The ECCHA was created in August 2001 as Blue Ridge Hockey Conference or BRHC by eight collegiate hockey programs in Virginia and North Carolina. It was originally created as an ACHA Division III spin-off of the Atlantic Coast Collegiate Hockey League (ACCHL), which competed at the Division II level. The original intent of the BRHC was to house newer and/or less organized programs until they demonstrated enough success to be promoted to the ACCHL. However, after a few years, the BRHC separated from the ACCHL and became its own stand-alone league.

The BRHC has advanced four of its members to the ACHA National Tournament since 2003.

As of the summer of 2017, the BRHC was restructured to form the East Coast Collegiate Hockey Association with the intent to improve the quality of its brand of ACHA Division III hockey in the mid-Atlantic and Southern region. The league transitioned back into the ACCHL for the start of the 2019–2020 season.

== Teams ==
- ECCHA Atlantic Division North
  - American University
  - Northern Virginia Community College
  - Marymount University
  - College of William & Mary
- ECCHA Atlantic Division South
  - Old Dominion University
  - University of Richmond
  - East Carolina University
  - Appalachian State University
- ECCHA Colonial Division
  - Christopher Newport University
  - College of Charleston
  - Coastal Carolina University
  - Radford University
  - Virginia Commonwealth University
  - The Citadel

== Former teams ==
The last year as BRHC, in 2017, conference's membership had tripled since 2007, making it the largest collegiate hockey conference in the United States.

Colonial Division

School	Location	Founded	Affiliation	Nickname	Colors
Christopher Newport University	Newport News, VA	1961	Public	Captains	
East Carolina University	Greenville, NC	1907	Public (University of North Carolina System)	Pirates	
University of North Carolina-Wilmington	Wilmington, NC	1947	Public (University of North Carolina System)	Seahawks	
Radford University	Radford, VA	1910	Public	Highlanders	
Virginia Commonwealth University	Richmond, VA	1838	Public	Rams	
Coastal Carolina University	Conway, SC	1954	Public	Chanticleers	
George Mason University	Fairfax, VA	1949 as branch of University of Virginia, independent university by 1972	Public	Patriots	

Atlantic Division- North Region

School	Location	Founded	Affiliation	Nickname	Colors
American University	Washington D.C.	1893	Private/Methodist	Eagles	
Catholic University	Washington D.C.	1887	Private/Roman Catholic	Cardinals	
Marymount University	Arlington, VA	1856	Private/Roman Catholic	Saints	
Northern Virginia Community College	Annandale, VA	1964	Community College	Nighthawks	
College of William and Mary	Williamsburg, VA	1693	Private	Tribe	

Atlantic Division- South Region

School	Location	Founded	Affiliation	Nickname	Colors
Old Dominion University	Norfolk, VA	1930	Public	Monarchs	
University of Richmond	Richmond, VA	1930	Private	Spiders	
Appalachian State University	Boone, NC	1899	Public (University of North Carolina System)	Mountaineers	
Johnson & Wales University	Charlotte, NC	2004	Private/Non-profit	Wildcats	
The Citadel	Charleston, SC	1839	Public Military College	Bulldogs	

== Conference champions ==
The championship tournament is held every year on the third weekend of February. In 2015 it was held at Chilled Ponds in Chesapeake, Virginia.

Year	Champion
2001-02	Charleston
2002-03	Appalachian State
2003-04	Richmond
2004-05	Richmond
2005-06	Richmond
2006-07	Richmond
2007-08	Old Dominion
2008-09	VCU
2009-10	Appalachian State
2010-11	William & Mary
2011-12	Liberty
2012-13	James Madison
2013-14	James Madison
2014-15	Catholic University
2015-16	Northern Virginia Community College
2016-17	Citadel
2017-18	Richmond

=== Colonial Division ===
Year	Champion
2008-09	George Washington
2009-10	Loyola-Maryland
2010-11	Loyola-Maryland
2011-12	Christopher Newport
2012-13	Christopher Newport
2013-14	Loyola-Maryland
2014-15	Christopher Newport
2015-16	George Mason
2016-17	Christopher Newport
2017-18	Christopher Newport

== See also ==
- American Collegiate Hockey Association
- List of ice hockey leagues
