= College Hockey East =

Established	1971 as WPIHA 2002 as CHE; used to be WPCHA and WPIHA
Members	24
Sport	ACHA Division 2/3 hockey
Region	Northeast
States	4 – Pennsylvania, New York, Ohio, West Virginia
Headquarters	Pittsburgh, PA
Commissioner	David L. Fryer, Jr.
Associate Commissioner	Jamison Roth
Executive Emeritus	Chuck Kuzniewski

College Hockey East (CHE) is a mixed American Collegiate Hockey Association (ACHA) Division 2 and Division 3 league for universities in the Western Pennsylvania region.

== History ==
College Hockey East was originally named the Western Pennsylvania Intercollegiate Hockey Association (WPIHA), which was organized during a dinner meeting hosted by Carnegie Mellon University at Skibo Hall on March 26, 1971. The meeting was attended by team representatives of the following colleges and universities: Carnegie Mellon University, Duquesne University, Gannon University, Indiana University of Pennsylvania, Penn State University-West, University of Pittsburgh, Saint Vincent College, and Slippery Rock University. Robert W. McCurdy, who then was serving as the Director of Student Activities at Carnegie Mellon, led the meeting with the help of Clifford C. Wise. During that session, the WPIHA was officially founded. McCurdy was elected as the first Commissioner of the league, and Wise was elected the first WPIHA Secretary. Representatives from Saint Francis did not attend the first organizational meeting, but their team joined the league shortly after its formation.

The league began its first official season of intercollegiate competition in the fall of 1971. There were 8 teams in the league, including Carnegie Mellon, Duquesne, IUP, Penn State West, Pitt, Saint Francis, Saint Vincent, and Slippery Rock. Despite helping found the organization, Gannon University (then Gannon College) did not enter a team in the WPIHA until a few years later.

McCurdy served as the WPIHA Commissioner for the first three seasons of the association. Following his tenure, Sam Orr commissioned the WPIHA for one season before handing the reigns over to Jack McKinnon, who served as Commissioner from 1975 to 1979. It was during McKinnon's tenure that the WPIHA officially became the Western Pennsylvania Collegiate Hockey Association (WPCHA) in 1975. Michael G. Kaleina from Saint Vincent College was elected the fourth Commissioner of the WPCHA in 1979. Kaleina remained the league's Commissioner from 1979 to 2002, during which time the WPCHA and Western Pennsylvania saw its first big growth of college hockey.

The 2002–03 season marked the end of an era and the start of a new legacy. On April 21, 2002, the WPCHA was officially renamed to College Hockey East (CHE) in an effort to forge new relationships with a broader scale of colleges and universities beyond the limits of Western Pennsylvania. Under the guidance of new Commissioner Charles R. Kuzniewski II, the league expanded into Ohio and New York, adding to the existing teams in Pennsylvania and West Virginia. With help from Associate Commissioner Thomas P. Harper and IUP Head Coach Samuel Kelly, the College Hockey Association (CHA) was formed in 2004 as an extension of the CHE, offering a place to play for new and developing programs.

Robert Morris University (then Robert Morris College) changed the landscape of collegiate hockey in the region by winning the American Collegiate Hockey Association (ACHA) Men's Division 3 National Championship in 2002. In turn, this took the profile of the entire CHE and its teams from a regional level to a national scale, and in 2006, all CHE members also became members of the American Collegiate Hockey Association (ACHA) at the Division 3 level, creating a national affiliation that many CHE teams were already pursuing. From that point forward, CHE teams annually made appearances in the ACHA Regional and National Tournaments, and California University of Pennsylvania won the ACHA Men's Division 3 National Championship in 2008. Many CHE players and coaches also began to garner regional and national awards and recognition for their accomplishments.

After 10 seasons of continuously directing the league to new heights, Kuzniewski passed the torch in 2011 to new Commissioner DJ Craven, who had played 5 seasons in the CHE with Penn State Behrend and served as the team's General Manager. In Craven's two seasons as the CHE Commissioner, he initiated a new revision of the league's by-laws and oversaw the addition of the CHE Select Team, a squad of the CHE's top players that competed against all-star teams from other ACHA Division 3 leagues in a post-season showcase.

The league welcomed its seventh Commissioner on June 2, 2013, when David L. Fryer, Jr. took the helm. Fryer was already an experienced CHE administrator in various roles with the league, so the CHE didn't miss a beat. Fryer immediately merged the CHA under the CHE umbrella as a second division of play, and by the start of the following season, the CHE had expanded that division to 13 teams. So Fryer restructured the league to include a new, third division of play for the colleges whose teams were generally in their infancy, allowing all CHE programs to be in a competitive division of teams with similar goals.

With the assistance of Associate Commissioner Jamison P. Roth, Fryer also created the CHE's first women's division in that same 2014–15 campaign. The CHE adopted four women's teams who had withdrawn from a different league due to a shared desire to solidify their programs and increase their competitiveness nationally. Those teams were California University of Pennsylvania, University of Delaware, Pennsylvania State University, and West Chester University.

Together, those teams and the CHE set out to grow the sport for female athletes at the collegiate club level in the eastern US. Behind Fryer's leadership, that mission quickly became a reality, as the CHE hosted 10 women's teams at the start of the 2017–18 season, despite the loss of one founding member to a higher division of play. The CHE women's teams were also very competitive nationally, with several teams qualifying each season for the ACHA Women's Division 2 National Tournament each season and two teams (Penn State and West Chester) advancing to the national championship games in back-to-back seasons.

With nearly 50 seasons in existence, College Hockey East is one of the oldest conferences of club hockey programs in the country.

The CHE has produced two ACHA Division 3 National Championship teams. In 2002 Robert Morris University beat University of Wyoming 3–2 to become the first. In 2008 California University of Pennsylvania beat San Diego State University 7–3 to become the second.

== Current teams ==
Men's D3

- Akron
- California (PA)
- Case Western Reserve
- Duquesne University
- Indiana University of Pennsylvania
- Kent State University
- Penn State University
- Pittsburgh-Johnstown
- Robert Morris
- Saint Vincent College
- Slippery Rock University
- West Virginia University

Men's D4

- California (PA)
- Carnegie Mellon University
- Robert Morris University
- The College of Wooster

Women's D2

- Brockport
- University at Buffalo
- Mercyhurst University
- Niagara
- Ohio State
- Oswego State University
- University of Pittsburgh
- RIT
- Robert Morris University
- West Virginia University

== Conference champions ==
Men's D3

- 2024 – Saint Vincent College
- 2023 – California (PA)
- 2022 – Indiana (PA)
- 2021 – No Season due to the COVID-19 pandemic
- 2020 – California (PA)
- 2019 – California (PA)
- 2018 – California (PA)
- 2017 – California (PA)
- 2016 – California (PA)
- 2015 – California (PA)
- 2014 – Pittsburgh-Johnstown
- 2013 – California (PA)
- 2012 – California (PA)
- 2011 – California (PA)
- 2010 – California (PA)
- 2009 – California (PA)
- 2008 – California (PA)
- 2007 – California (PA)
- 2006 – Indiana (PA)
- 2005 – Pittsburgh-Johnstown
- 2004 – Indiana (PA)
- 2003 – Pittsburgh-Johnstown
- 2002 – Penn State
- 2001 – Washington & Jefferson
- 2000 – Robert Morris
- 1999 – Allegheny College
- 1998 – Robert Morris
- 1997 – Penn State
- 1996 – Penn State
- 1995 – Pittsburgh
- 1994 – West Virginia
- 1983 – Carnegie Mellon University
- 1978 – Saint Francis University

Men's D4

- 2024 – Robert Morris
- 2023 – Robert Morris
- 2022 – Case Western Reserve
- 2021 – No Season due to the COVID-19 pandemic
- 2020 – University of Pittsburgh at Greensburg
- 2019 – Case Western Reserve
- 2018 – Penn State Altoona
- 2017 – Penn State Altoona
- 2016 – Penn State Altoona
- 2015 – Carnegie Mellon University
- 2014 – University of Pittsburgh at Greensburg
- 2013 – California (PA)
- 2012 – California (PA)
- 2011 – St. John Fisher College
- 2010 – Canisius College
- 2009 – Canisius College
- 2008 – Hilbert College
- 2007 – Hilbert College
- 2006 – Youngstown State University
- 2005 – Community College of Allegheny County

Men's D5

- 2018 – Allegheny College
- 2017 – Edinboro University of Pennsylvania
- 2016 – Case Western Reserve University

Women's D2

- 2024 – Mercyhurst University
- 2023 – Niagara
- 2022 – Pitt
- 2021 – No Season due to the COVID-19 pandemic
- 2020 – Mercyhurst University
- 2019 – Liberty University
- 2018 – University at Buffalo
- 2017 – University at Buffalo
- 2016 – West Chester University
- 2015 – California (PA)
- 2014 – California (PA)

== See also ==
- American Collegiate Hockey Association
- List of ice hockey leagues
