= Central States Developmental Hockey League =

Established in 1999, the Central States Developmental Hockey League (CSDHL) is a competitive league organized for elite Tier II youth hockey teams within Illinois and the Central States region. It is sanctioned by USA Hockey. Often referred to as the best AA league in North America, the CSDHL offers competitive travel hockey at the Midget, Bantam, Pee Wee, and Squirt levels.

== Teams ==
- Affton Americans
  - St. Louis Eagles
- Bloomington Thunder (BYH)
- Chesterfield Falcons (CHA)
  - St. Louis Knights
- Chicago Blues (Bensenville)
- Chicago Bulldogs (Lincolnwood)
- Chicago Hawks (Darien)
- Chicago Jets
- Chicago Stallions
- Cyclones Amateur Hockey Association (Geneva)
- DuPage Black Bears (Glen Ellyn)
- Falcons Hockey Association (Highland Park)
- Glenview Stars
- Huskies Hockey Club (Romeoville)
- Hyland Hills Jaguars (Westminster, Colorado)
- Ice Dogs Hockey Association (Vernon Hills)
- Indy Junior Fuel (IYHA, Carmel)
- Iowa City Jr. Heartlanders (ICH)
- Jaguar Hockey Club (Joliet)
- Kenosha Komets
- West Dundee Leafs Hockey Club (WDHC)
- Mammoth Hockey Club (Evanston)
- Meramec Sharks (Tesson Ferry, Missouri)
- Midwest Blackbirds (Dyer, Indiana)
- Mohawks Hockey Club (Hammond, Indiana)
- Northbrook Bluehawks
- Northern Express (Park Ridge)
- Northwest Chargers (Mount Prospect)
- Omaha Hockey Club (Boys Town, Nebraska)
- Orland Park Vikings
- Pekin Dragons
- Peoria Youth Hockey Association (Jr. Mustangs)
- Quad City Hockey Association (Davenport)
- Rockford Hockey Club (Loves Park)
- Sabre Hockey Association (Naperville)
- St. Jude Knights (Crestwood)
- St. Louis Sting
- Southern Illinois Ice Hawks (O'Fallon)
- Timberwolves (Wolf Pack Hockey Club, Hoffman Estates)
- Troy Sting (TYHA)
- Twin Bridges Lightning (East Alton)
- Vipers (Lake County Youth Hockey Association, Gurnee)
- Wilmette Jr. Trevians
- Winnetka Warriors
- Winter Club Hockey (Lake Forest)
- Yellowjackets (Fire Wagon Hockey, Crystal Lake)

== Recent champions ==
Season	Midget U18	Midget U16	Midget U15	Bantam Major	Bantam Minor	Pee Wee Major	Pee Wee Minor	Squirt Major	Squirt Minor
2025–26	Affton	Sting	Vipers	Eagles	Peoria	Winnetka	Vikings	Wilmette	Vipers
