= Independent Amateur Hockey League =

The Independent Amateur Hockey League (NAHL — Latvian: Neatkarīga amatieru hokeja līga) is the largest amateur ice hockey league in the Baltic States (Estonia, Latvia, Lithuania). Located in Riga, Latvia. It unites more than 80 teams and about 2 400 players in 8 leagues (including 2 oldtimers leagues).

== History ==
The modern history of amateur ice hockey began in 1996, when Latvian national ice hockey team returned to the top division of the Ice Hockey World Championship. Possibly this fact was very important in the further development of amateur hockey in Latvia.

At the end of summer in 1996 a group of enthusiasts decided to unite the unorganised groups of amateur hockey players and organize their 1st ice hockey championship for amateur teams. The tournament was successful - 7 teams took part in it ("Krāsainie Lējumi", "Bauska-Inčukalns", "Tiesneši", "Ledus Vaboles", "Vakara Ziņas", "Balsts", RTU). The first season in 1997/1998 started with even more teams - 16 teams in two groups.

The first NAHL Championship took place in autumn 1999, where 7 teams participated ("Anatta", "Lūši", "Vektor", "Lattelecom", Jaunpils, Jūrmala, "Vikingi-Eglīte").

In the season 2001/2002, 25 teams competed in two divisions. In the strongest group such teams as "Anatta", "Kurbads", "Lūši", "RD Electronics", "Profsistems", "Memphis/Smokers", "Berģu nams", "Viva sports-1", "Viva sports-2", "Mamuti", "Buldogi", "DSM" participated.

The increase in the number of participants required more effort for organising the tournaments - Oļegs Siračenko, Aleksandrs Mejlehs, Sergejs Šarkovs, Eduards Andersons, Oskars Miljons, Guntars Precinieks and Aleksejs Rešetņikovs joined the NAHL management. They put the finishing touches to the regulations of competitions and elected the League Council.

Independent Amateur Hockey League "NAHL" has been an officially registered sport public organization since autumn 2001. It provides the hockey competitions not only in Riga, but also in other hockey halls of Latvia.

The season 2002/2003 started with 43 teams. They are all divided into 3 groups - the Superleague (16 teams), Higher League (14) and the First League (13).

NAHL teams have an experience of friendly matches in abroad - NAHL hockey clubs have participated in friendly matches in Canada, Finland, Sweden, Germany, Austria, Estonia, Lithuania, Poland, Hungary, Ireland, Belarus and Russia.

Currently NAHL unites 80 amateur teams, which are divided, according to their level, into 6 leagues, plus 2 old-timer leagues divided into Group А (ex-professionals) and В (amateurs). There are also the Latvian regional teams – their numbers are about 200.

NAHL competitions take place in 10 ice halls. The league has annually organised the Latvian ice-hockey championship among amateur hockey teams (from September to March), and then – the NAHL CUP in April. Besides the regular Championship and the NAHL CUP - NAHL also organizes tournaments, where teams from Lithuania, Estonia, Russia, Switzerland and Finland are participating.

The hockey season begins with the Captains Match, at the end of the January a Star Match takes place. Spring is the season of "Bank Cup", in May–June the following tournaments are usually organized - it's “NAHL - PREMJERA” for the beginner teams, and the senior tournament 45+ "SENJOR" ("SENIORS").

Almost all teams use the services of professional coaches. Such famous hockey players as Helmuts Balderis, Oleg Znarok, Anatolijs Jemeļjanenko, Sergejs Povečerovskis, Juris Opuļskis, Aleksandrs Kerčs take part in NAHL competitions.

Amateur teams from Lithuania are also interested in participating. The Lithuanian team "LEDO LINIJA" from Šiauliai participates in NAHL championship.

The league's latest project is the tournament Open Ice Riga. The first part of it – Spring 2008 – took place in March 2008. The teams from Russia, Lithuania and Latvia took part in these games for the teams in the "C-Club" group.

NAHL competitions have evoked great interest of Latvian enterprises, companies and financial institutions – Swedbank, Parex, Aizkraukles Banka, Rietumu Banka, Latvijas Biznesa Banka, Lattelecom, LMT, Latvijas Pasts, Balva, Monarh, RER, Rīgas Satiksme, ASK, Sāga have participated in NAHL organized competitions and tournaments.
