= Bulgarian Women's Hockey League =

National women's ice hockey league in Bulgaria

The Bulgarian Women's Hockey League is the national women's ice hockey league in Bulgaria.

== 2008 teams ==
- Ledeni iskri
- Slavia Sofia

== Champions ==
- 2008: Slavia Sofia
