= American Collegiate Hockey Association =

College ice hockey association

- Established: 1991; 35 years ago
- Type: Chartered non-profit corporation
- Tax ID no.: 86-0818150
- Location: Troy, Michigan, U.S.
- President: Paul Hebert
- Executive Director: Craig Barnett
- Revenue: $1.2 million USD (2024)
- Website: www.achahockey.org

The American Collegiate Hockey Association (ACHA) is a college ice hockey association. The ACHA's purpose is to be an organization of collegiate affiliated programs, which provides structure, regulates operations, and promotes quality in collegiate ice hockey. The ACHA currently has three men's and two women's divisions and includes approximately 450 teams from across the United States and Canada. Most ACHA teams offer few athletic scholarships and typically receive far less university funding. The ACHA offers an opportunity for college hockey programs that struggle with large budgets and Title IX issues, as an alternative to the National Collegiate Athletic Association (NCAA) financial structure.

== Policies and regulation ==
The interest in college hockey has grown as the game of hockey has grown in the United States. But as aggressively as the sport has grown at the grass-roots level, the number of NCAA programs has not expanded as rapidly to meet the demand as these youth players reach college and look to extend their hockey-playing experience. This is why the ACHA level was created.

The ACHA's primary mission is to support the growth of two-year and four-year collegiate hockey programs nationwide. The ACHA identifies standards that serve to unite and regulate teams at the collegiate level. The ACHA emphasizes academic performance, institutional sanction, eligibility criteria, and standards of play and opportunities for national competition, and the ACHA promotes all aspects of collegiate hockey stressing the personal development of individual athletes as well as national recognition for member organizations. In order to do this, the ACHA has developed organizational by-laws and a Policies and Procedures Manual to provide the policy foundation for the organization as it works to fulfill its purpose. These documents are reviewed yearly at the ACHA's annual meeting.

The ACHA's policies cover team and player eligibility, rules of play, ranking procedures, national tournament procedures, and other administrative issues, although the ACHA parallels the NCAA Division III with most eligibility requirements, recruitment processes, gameplay rules, etc. The league holds its annual meeting in conjunction with the annual convention of the American Hockey Coaches Association, in the month of April in Naples, Florida.

== ACHA history ==
The ACHA was established on April 20, 1991. Fifteen charter members met during the Chicago Showcase in Skokie, Illinois at the North Shore Hilton. These member teams had been playing college hockey for many years but wished to legitimize its play by standardizing some of its procedures.

The members that created the organization were Tom Keegan (ACHA), Al Murdoch (Iowa State), Joe Battista (Penn State), Jim Gilmore (Ohio), Ernie Ferrari (Stanford), Howard Jenks (California), Jeff Aikens (North Dakota State), Don Spencer (West Virginia), Jim Barry (Navy), Scott Fuller (Navy), Leo Golembiewski (Arizona), Ron Starr (DePaul), Cary Adams (PCHA), Jim Warden (PCHA) and Jack White (UCLA).

The inaugural year of the ACHA was the 1991–1992 season. The goal of the organization was to create an impartial governing body to monitor national tournaments, player eligibility, and general oversight. Over the years the ACHA quickly grew to over 150 teams in three men's divisions.

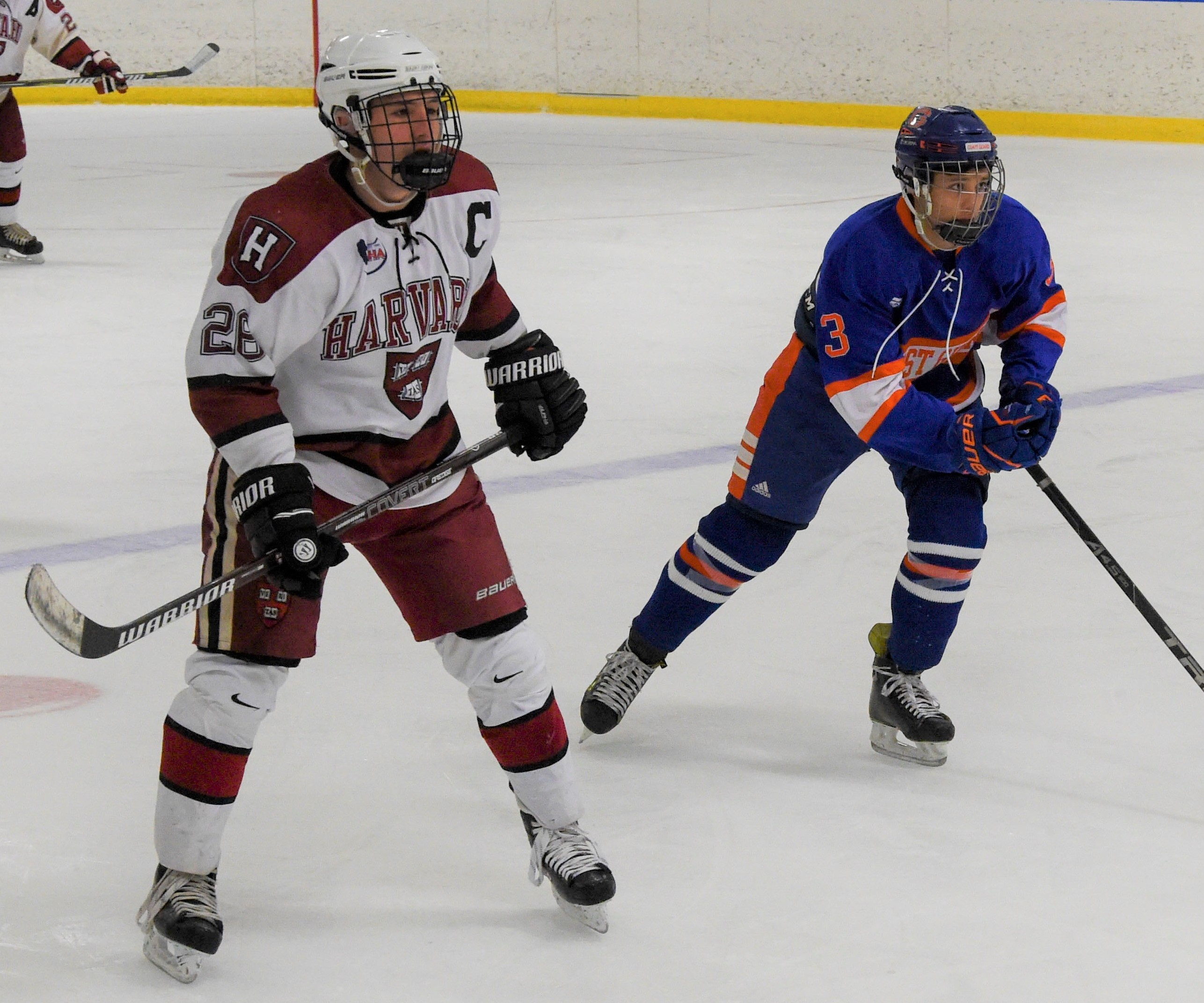
An ACHA Division II game between Harvard and Coast Guard in 2019

A Women's Division was added in 2000 with a second Women's division being added for the 2006–2007 season.

By the 2001–2002 season, marking their 10th anniversary, the ACHA had a total of 179 teams registered with 33 teams in Division I, 100 teams in Division II, 18 teams in Division III, and 20 teams in the Women's Division.

By the 2002–2003 season that number raised to over 250 teams, with Division III adding over 80 teams alone.

By the 2003–2004 season the number raised to 278 teams: 40 teams in D-I, 124 teams in D-II, 87 teams in D-III, and 27 teams in the Women's Division.

By the summer of 2007 ACHA membership had reached 360 teams (M1-54, M2-190, M3-139, W1-32, W2-8), that cover 48 of the 50 states.

During the summer of 2009 the University of Alaska Fairbanks established a Women's Division II team becoming the 49th state in the ACHA. Hawaii is currently the only state without an ACHA team.

Every year since 2003, the Men's Division I Showcase has been an event that features some of the top teams in the ACHA.

ACHA partners with Fasthockey.com to broadcast many of the league's games.

In 2017, the ACHA adopted a new hosting format for holding the annual National Championship Tournament for all Men's & Women's Divisions. Then ACHA Executive Director Michael Walley championed an idea to hold all of the ACHA's National Championship Tournaments in one major U.S. city, in partnership with that city's National Hockey League (NHL) team. The inaugural year saw the 2017 ACHA National Championship Tournament Festival held in Columbus, Ohio, in partnership with the NHL's Columbus Blue Jackets. Then ACHA Executive Director Michael Walley assumed the role of Tournament Director for the inaugural tournament, Andy Storz was placed in the role of National Tournament Manager-Game Day Hockey Operations/P.A. Announcer/Anthem Soloist, while Fasthockey.com handled broadcasting. In July 2017, after undergoing a nationwide search, Russ Slagle was selected by the ACHA's Board of Directors and appointed to fill the vacant staff position of ACHA National Tournament Director, and A.J. Boldan was placed in the role of National Tournament Manager-Broadcast Operations/Executive Producer in conjunction with the ACHA opting to engineer its own National Tournament broadcasts on a newly launched YouTube channel "ACHA National Championships".

== Membership ==
A map of all ACHA D1 men's hockey teams.

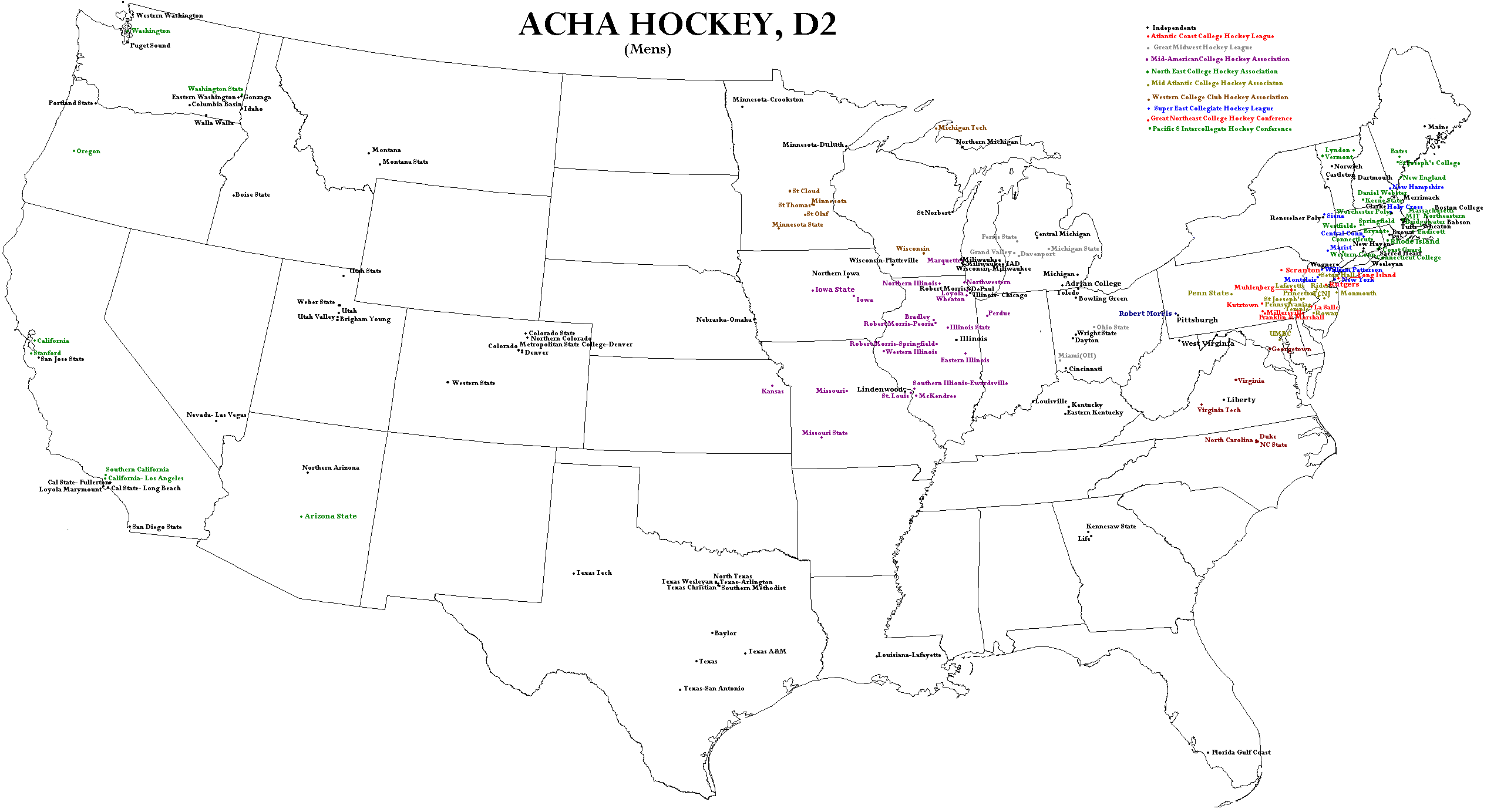
A map of all ACHA D2 men's hockey teams.

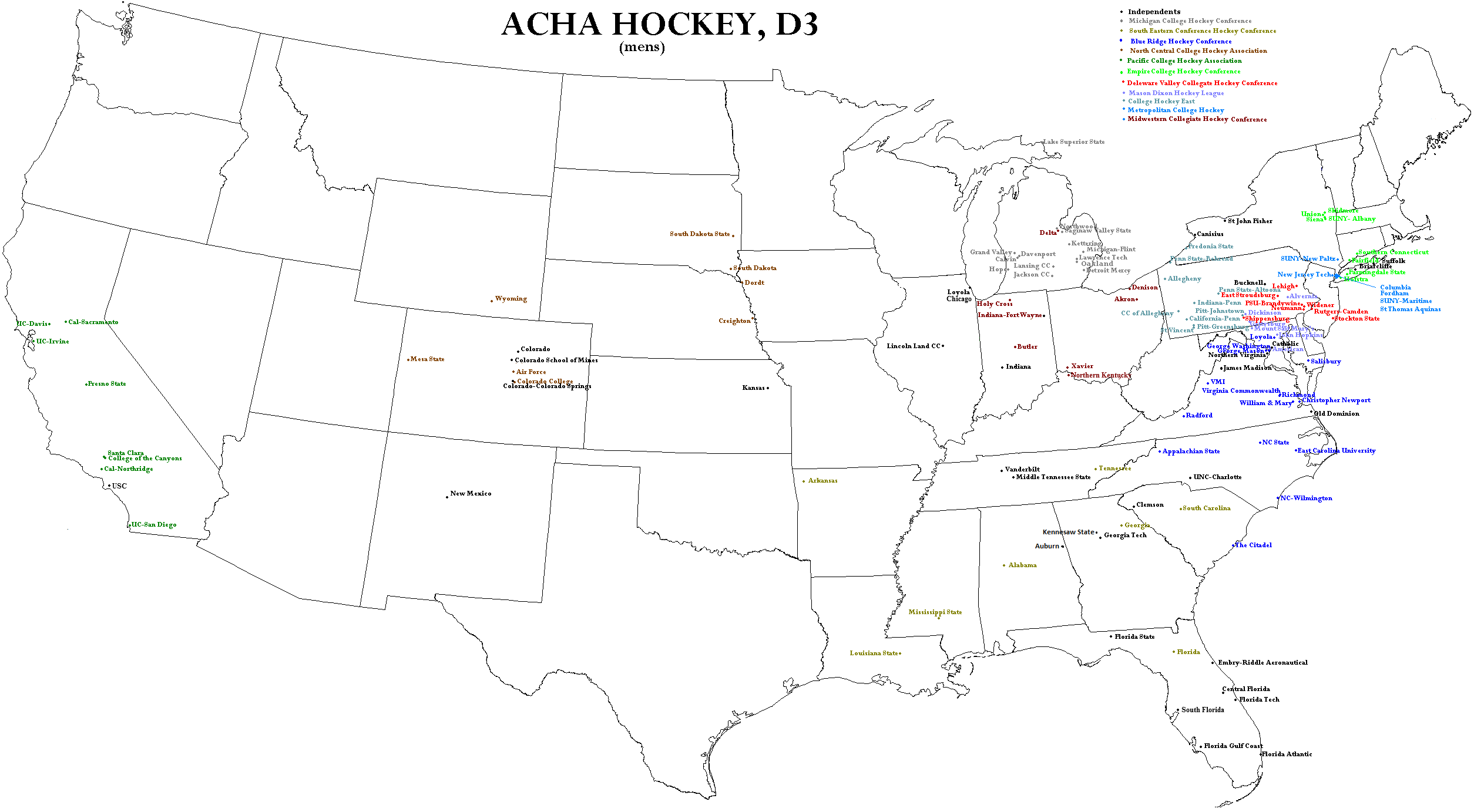
A map of all ACHA D3 men's hockey teams.

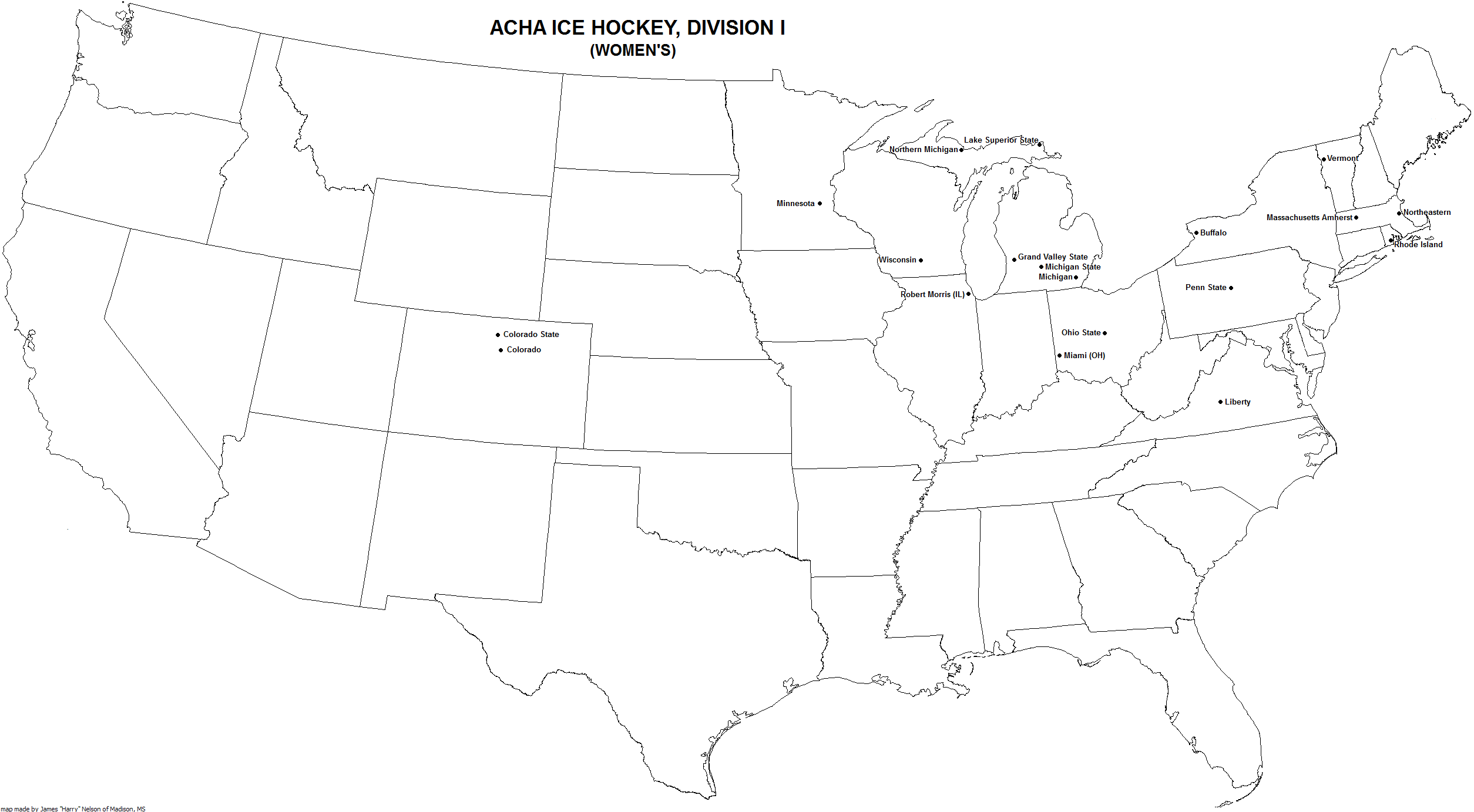
A map of all ACHA D1 women's hockey teams.

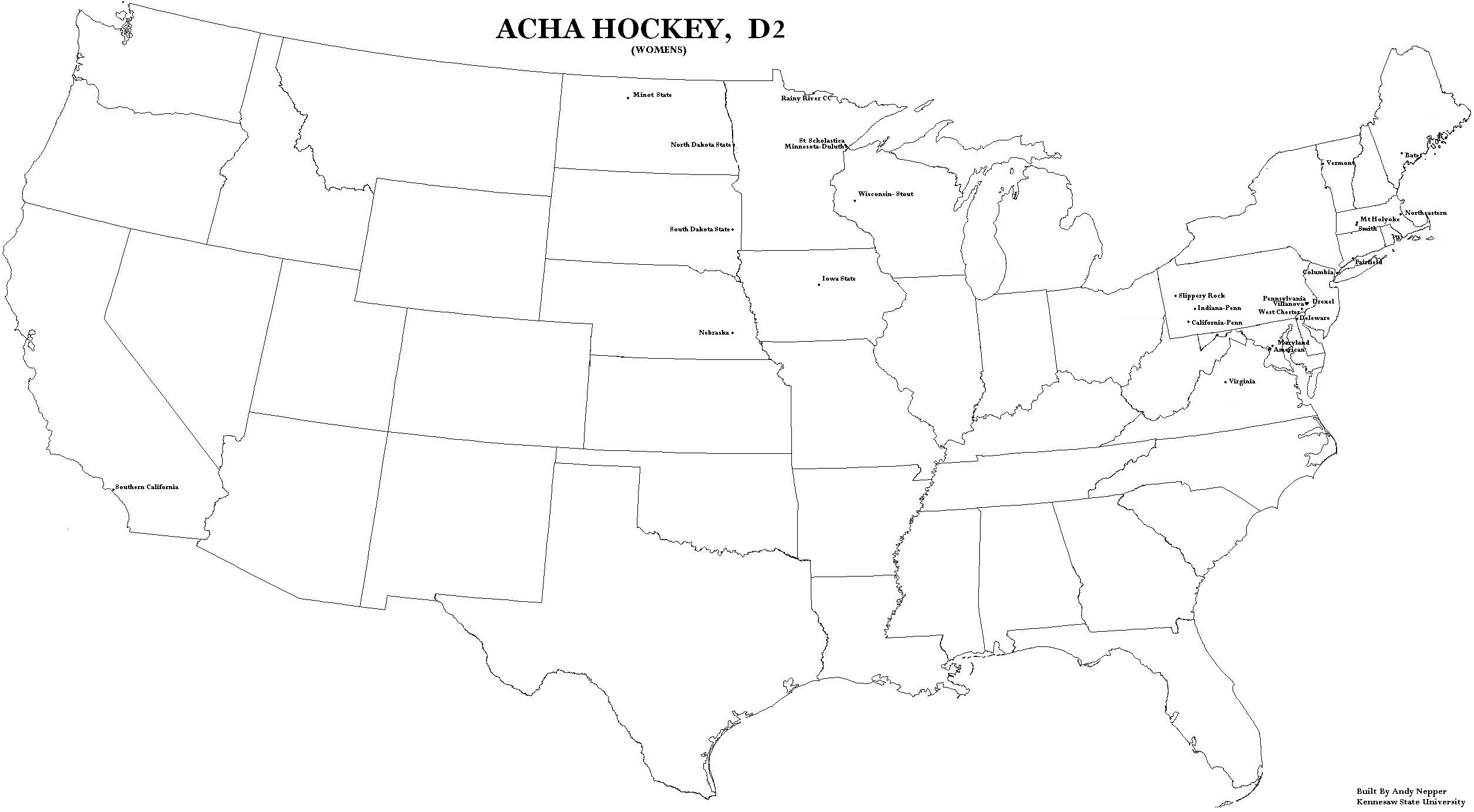
A map of all ACHA D2 women's hockey teams.

The ACHA includes both Men's and Women's Divisions. The Men's side is made up of three Divisions: 1, 2, and 3. Division 3 was the last to be established in 1999. Each division has its own distinguishing set of guidelines which are explained below. The Women's side has two divisions. Division 1 began in 2000 and Division 2 is the most recent addition to the ACHA with its inception in 2006.

Despite most teams' non-varsity status, the caliber of ACHA play can be quite high, especially in Division 1. Many large universities that do not sponsor hockey at the NCAA varsity level have become powerhouses, such as Ohio University, Adrian College, and Lindenwood University. Additionally, several universities that do sponsor NCAA varsity hockey teams also field ACHA-affiliated teams. Of all non-varsity sports activities, the ACHA-affiliated hockey teams generally garner the most attention at their universities, such as Missouri State where it is the third-largest spectator sport. The same can be said for the Arizona and University of Georgia who draw the third-largest fan base behind football and basketball.

All ACHA teams are members of USA Hockey and the American Hockey Coaches Association (AHCA).

=== Men's divisions ===
==== Men's Division 1 ====
ACHA Men's Division 1 comprises 72 teams as of the 2023–2024 season. Some of these teams also compete against NCAA Hockey D1 and D3 Schools throughout the pre-season in informal exhibition games. Nine conferences and Independent teams compete annually for the Murdoch Cup, which is awarded to the Men's ACHA Division 1 National Champion. Twenty teams compete in the National Tournament. These top-twenty teams are ranked/selected by way of computer rankings, and as determined by auto-berths from the seven regular-season Conference champions. At Nationals, teams ranked 1–12 all receive first-round byes, with teams ranked 13–20 matching up 20 vs 13 (etc.), for the rights to play in the second-round in pre-determined bracket slots. Since 2012, two teams (Penn State and Arizona State) have moved from ACHA to NCAA Division I. A third, Lindenwood moved up in 2022.

Conferences

- Atlantic Coast Collegiate Hockey League (ACCHL)
- College Hockey Mid-America (CHMA)
- Eastern Collegiate Hockey Association (ECHA)
- Great Lakes Collegiate Hockey League (GLCHL)
- Great Lakes Six Hockey Conference (GL6HC)
- Midwest College Hockey (MCH)
- Northeast Collegiate Hockey League (NECHL)
- Western Collegiate Hockey League (WCHL)
- Wolverine Hoosier Athletic Conference (WHAC)

==== Men's Division 2 ====
ACHA Men's Division 2 is currently the largest division in the ACHA, it includes approximately 200 teams in 12 conferences and Independents. These teams are divided into four Regions (Central, Northeast, Southeast and West). A total of 16 teams qualify for the National Tournament, four from each region. Each month of the season a ranking of the top 15 teams in region is released. After the final ranking in February the top two seeds from each region earn an automatic berth into Nationals. Seeds 3–10 compete in their respective single-elimination Regional Tournaments, with the two teams who win both of their games also earning a Nationals berth. The National Tournament is a pool play format with the winners of each pool advancing to the semifinals. The semifinal match-ups are the winner of Pool A vs. Pool C and Pool B vs. Pool D.

Conferences

- Atlantic Coast Collegiate Hockey League (ACCHL)
- Big Mountain Hockey Conference (BMHC)
- Colonial States College Hockey Conference (CSCHC) (The Colonial)
- Mid-American Collegiate Hockey Association (MACHA)
- Mid-Atlantic Collegiate Hockey Association (MACH) (Folded 2023)
- Mountain West Collegiate Hockey League (MWCHL)
- Northeast Collegiate Hockey Association (NECHA)
- Northern Collegiate Hockey League (NCHL)
- Pacific 8 Intercollegiate Hockey Conference (PAC-8)
- Pacific Collegiate Hockey Association (PCHA) (Folded 2020)
- Super East Collegiate Hockey League (SECHL)
- Texas Collegiate Hockey Conference (TCHC)
- Tri-State Collegiate Hockey League (TSCHL)
- Western Collegiate Club Hockey Association (WCCHA)
- West Coast Hockey Conference (WCHC)

==== Men's Division 3 ====
ACHA Men's Division 3 consists of approximately 140 teams in nine conferences and Independents. These teams are also divided into four Regions (Atlantic, North, Pacific and South). A total of 16 teams qualify for the National Tournament in the same manner as Division 2. The National Tournament has also been conducted in the same manner as Division 2 since 2010. Before that it was single elimination and every team played four games. The one exception is the semifinals match-ups. The winner of Pool A plays the winner of Pool B and the winner of Pool C plays the winner of Pool D.

Conferences

- Blue Ridge Hockey Conference (BRHC)
- College Hockey East (CHE)
- Indiana Collegiate Hockey Conference (ICHC)
- Metropolitan Collegiate Hockey Conference (MCHC) (Contains Non-ACHA members)
- Michigan Collegiate Hockey Conference (MCHC)
- Mid-American Collegiate Hockey Association (MACHA)
- Northeast Collegiate Hockey Association (NECHA)

=== Women's divisions ===
==== Women's Division 1 ====
ACHA Women's Division 1 includes 25 teams for the 2019–20 season, with all but independent Wisconsin playing in one of the four WD1 conferences. Eight teams qualify for the national tournament each season: automatic bids are awarded to the playoff champions of the Central Collegiate Women's Hockey Association, the Western Women's Collegiate Hockey League and Women's Midwest College Hockey, with the remainder of the field filled out by the highest-placing teams from the last of a series of weekly computer rankings. At nationals, the eight teams are paired off by ranking (1 vs. 8, 2 vs. 7, etc.) for a best-of-three first round, with the winners of those series advancing to the semifinals.

Conferences

- Central Collegiate Women's Hockey Association (CCWHA)
- Eastern Collegiate Women's Hockey League (ECWHL)
- Western Women's Collegiate Hockey League (WWCHL)
- Women's Midwest College Hockey (WMCH)

==== Women's Division 2 ====
ACHA Women's Division 2 includes 51 teams for the 2019–20 season, with a majority standing as a member of one of four conferences. All teams are sorted into the Northeast Region (13 teams), the Southeast Region (19 teams), or the West Region (19 teams). At the end of the year, the top four teams from each region in the final edition of a monthly computer ranking are invited to the ACHA National Tournament. The WD2 tournament differs from WD1 in that teams are divided into four pools and play a round robin, with the pool winners advancing to the semifinals.

Northeast Region Conference

- Independent Women's Collegiate Hockey League (IWCHL)

Southeast Region Conferences

- College Hockey East (CHE)
- Delaware Valley Collegiate Hockey Conference (DVCHC)

West Region Conference

- Central Collegiate Women's Hockey Association (CCWHA)
  - Note: The CCWHA includes both a Division 1 and a Division 2 conference, with separate groups of teams as members

== International competition ==
Players are selected from only ACHA Men's D1 to represent USA Hockey in the Winter World University Games, an IIHF and FISU event. ACHA Men's D2 and D3 division created the Select Teams to offer opportunities for the other Men division's to experience International hockey and they are ACHA events.

The Division 2 & Division 3 Selects Teams alternate going over to Europe each year during the Holiday Break to play European teams. The players are chosen from a round robin tournament in the spring usually in Pennsylvania. The tournament pits each conference's elite players against each other.

== Logos ==
The original ACHA logo was created by Dave Kammerdeiner of the West Virginia University Art Department under the direction of Don Spencer for a cost of $50.

In August 2003, the ACHA held an official contest to design a new logo, with the winning school receiving free registration for the 2003–2004 season. The University of Washington's Husky Hockey team won the contest, with former graphic-design intern Tom Eykemans designing the new version of the logo (as shown above).

== Men's champions ==
=== Division 1 champions ===
Year	National Champion	Runner-Up	Location	Host
1991–1992	Iowa State	Michigan-Dearborn	State College, PA	Penn State University
1992–1993	North Dakota State	Penn State	Fargo, ND	North Dakota State
1993–1994	North Dakota State	Eastern Michigan	Ames, IA	Iowa State University
1994–1995	Ohio	Penn State	Tucson, AZ	University of Arizona
1995–1996	Ohio	Iowa State	Athens, OH	Ohio University
1996–1997	Ohio	Iowa State	Ann Arbor, MI	Eastern Michigan University
1997–1998	Penn State	Ohio	Ames, IA	Iowa State University
1998–1999	Vacated (Iowa State)	Penn State	Newark, DE	University of Delaware
1999–2000	Penn State	Eastern Michigan	Minot, ND	Minot State University
2000–2001	Penn State	Delaware	Tucson, AZ	University of Arizona
2001–2002	Penn State	Illinois	Laurel, MD	Towson University
2002–2003	Penn State	Ohio	Athens, OH	Ohio University
2003–2004	Ohio	Penn State	Ames, IA	Iowa State University
2004–2005	Illinois	Penn State	Bensenville, IL	Robert Morris University (Illinois)
2005–2006	Rhode Island	Penn State	West Chester, PA	West Chester University
2006–2007	Oakland	Penn State	Youngstown, OH	Kent State University
2007–2008	Illinois	Lindenwood	Rochester, NY	Monroe County Sports Commission
2008–2009	Lindenwood	Illinois	Gates Mills, OH	Greater Cleveland Sports Commission
2009–2010	Lindenwood	Iowa State	Bensenville, IL	Robert Morris University (Illinois)
2010–2011	Davenport	Lindenwood	Newark, DE	University of Delaware
2011–2012	Delaware	Oakland	Strongsville, OH	Kent State & Greater Cleveland Sports Commission
2012–2013	Minot State	Lindenwood	Bensenville, IL	Robert Morris University (Illinois)
2013–2014	Arizona State	Robert Morris (IL)	Newark, DE	University of Delaware
2014–2015	Central Oklahoma	Stony Brook	Strongsville, OH	John Carroll University & Greater Cleveland Sports Commission
2015–2016	Lindenwood	Iowa State	Bensenville, IL	Robert Morris University (Illinois)
2016–2017	Central Oklahoma	Ohio	Columbus, OH	Columbus Blue Jackets, OhioHealth Chiller Ice Rinks, & Greater Columbus Sports Commission
2017–2018	Adrian College	Illinois	Columbus, OH	Columbus Blue Jackets, OhioHealth Chiller Ice Rinks & Greater Columbus Sports Commission
2018–2019	Minot State	Iowa State	Frisco, TX	Dallas Stars, Frisco Convention and Visitors Bureau
2019–2020	Canceled due to the COVID-19 pandemic		Frisco, TX	Dallas Stars, Frisco Convention and Visitors Bureau
2020–2021	Adrian College	Minot State	St. Louis, MO	Maryville University
2021–2022	Lindenwood	Central Oklahoma	St. Louis, MO	Lindenwood University, Centene Community Ice Center
2022–2023	Minot State	Adrian College	Marlborough, MA	New England Sports Center
2023–2024	Adrian College	UNLV	St. Louis, MO	St. Louis Sports Commission, Centene Community Ice Center
2024–2025	UNLV	Adrian College	St. Louis, MO	Maryville University, Centene Community Ice Center
2025–2026	Ohio	Adrian College	St. Louis, MO	St. Louis Sports Commission, Centene Community Ice Center

Totals
Team	Titles	Years
Penn State	6	1990, 1998, 2000, 2001, 2002, 2003
Ohio	5	1995, 1996, 1997, 2004, 2026
Lindenwood	4	2009, 2010, 2016, 2022
Adrian College	3	2018, 2021, 2024
Minot State	3	2013, 2019, 2023
North Dakota State	3	1991, 1993, 1994
Central Oklahoma	2	2015, 2017
Illinois	2	2005, 2008
UNLV	1	2025
Arizona State	1	2014
Delaware	1	2012
Davenport	1	2011
Oakland	1	2007
Rhode Island	1	2006
Iowa State	1	1992

=== Division 2 champions ===
Year	National Champion	Runner-Up	Host/Location
1991–1992	Toledo	Kentucky	DePaul University
1992–1993	Buffalo State	Northern Iowa	Iowa State University
1993–1994	Ferris State	Colorado State	Siena College
1994–1995	Colorado State	Indiana	Colorado State University
1995–1996	Western Michigan	Life University	University of South Florida
1996–1997	Life University	Penn State	University of Missouri
1997–1998	Life University	Indiana	Rutgers University
1998–1999	Life University	Michigan State	University of Utah
1999–2000	Miami (OH)	Indiana	Indiana University
2000–2001	Life University	Weber State	Indiana University
2001–2002	Life University	Michigan	New York University
2002–2003	Colorado	Stony Brook	University of Southern California
2003–2004	Oakland	NYU	University of Maryland
2004–2005	Michigan State	Oakland	Oakland University
2005–2006	Oakland	Liberty	Rochester County Sports Commission
2006–2007	Michigan State	Davenport	Colorado State University
2007–2008	Davenport	Indiana	Florida Gulf Coast University
2008–2009	Davenport	Florida Gulf Coast	Grand Valley State University
2009–2010	Davenport	Central Connecticut State	Super East Collegiate Hockey League
2010–2011	Grand Valley State	Michigan State	San Jose State University
2011–2012	Florida Gulf Coast	Grand Valley State	Florida Gulf Coast University
2012–2013	Michigan State	Grand Valley State	Saint Louis University
2013–2014	New Hampshire	Florida Gulf Coast	Northeastern University
2014–2015	NYU	Florida Gulf Coast	University of Utah
2015–2016	Florida Gulf Coast	Liberty	Ice Line Quad Rinks
2016–2017	NYU	Liberty	Columbus, OH
2017–2018	Florida Gulf Coast	Lindenwood	Columbus, OH
2018–2019	Florida Gulf Coast	Northeastern	Frisco, TX
2019–2020	Canceled due to the COVID-19 pandemic		Frisco, TX
2020–2021	Mary	Iowa State	Mandan, ND
2021–2022	Mary	Florida Gulf Coast	St. Louis, MO
2022–2023	Massachusetts	Iowa	Marlborough, MA
2023–2024	Indiana	Miami (OH)	St. Louis, MO
2024–2025	Lindenwood	Montana State	St. Louis, MO
2025–2026	Florida Gulf Coast	Oklahoma State	St. Louis, MO

Totals
Team	Titles	Years
Florida Gulf Coast	5	2012, 2016, 2018, 2019, 2026
Life University	5	1997, 1998, 1999, 2001, 2002
Michigan State	3	2005, 2007, 2013
Davenport	3	2008, 2009, 2010
Mary	2	2021, 2022
NYU	2	2015, 2017
Oakland	2	2004, 2006
Lindenwood	1	2025
Indiana	1	2024
Massachusetts	1	2023
New Hampshire	1	2014
Grand Valley State	1	2011
Colorado	1	2003
Miami (OH)	1	2000
Western Michigan	1	1996
Colorado State	1	1995
Ferris State	1	1994
Buffalo State	1	1993
Toledo	1	1992

=== Division 3 champions ===
Year	National Champion	Runner-Up	Host/Location
1999–2000	Butler	Georgia Tech	US Naval Academy
2000–2001	Wyoming	South Dakota State	Georgia Tech
2001–2002	Robert Morris (PA)	Wyoming	Georgia Tech
2002–2003	Muskegon College	Hope College	Muskegon Community College
2003–2004	Calvin	Georgia	Arizona State University
2004–2005	Colorado	Florida Gulf Coast	California University (PA)
2005–2006	Wright State	Northwood	Fort Myers, FL
2006–2007	Kennesaw State	Albany	Fort Wayne, IN
2007–2008	California University (PA)	San Diego State	Rochester, MN
2008–2009	Saginaw Valley State	Florida Gulf Coast	Rochester, NY
2009–2010	Saginaw Valley State	Hope College	Fort Myers, FL
2010–2011	College of the Canyons	Hope College	Holland, MI
2011–2012	Adrian College	Davenport	Vineland, NJ
2012–2013	Adrian College	Michigan-Flint	Springfield, MO
2013–2014	Adrian College	Hope College	Coral Springs, FL
2014–2015	Michigan State	Florida Gulf Coast	Pelham, AL
2015–2016	Oakland	Aquinas College	Grand Rapids, MI
2016–2017	Aquinas College	Calvin	Columbus, OH
2017-2018	Hope College	Oakland	Columbus, OH
2018-2019	Sault College	Grand Valley State	Frisco, TX
2019–2020	Canceled due to the COVID-19 pandemic		Frisco, TX
2020–2021	Hope College	Arkansas	Grand Rapids, MI
2021–2022	Hope College	Michigan	St. Louis, MO
2022–2023	Michigan	Hope College	Marlborough, MA
2023–2024	Lawrence Tech	Grand Valley State	St. Louis, MO
2024–2025	Hope College	Air Force	St. Louis, MO
2025–2026	Air Force	Oakland	St. Louis, MO

Totals
Team	Titles	Years
Hope College	4	2018, 2021, 2022, 2025
Adrian College	3	2012, 2013, 2014
Saginaw Valley State	2	2009, 2010
Air Force	1	2026
Lawrence Tech	1	2024
Michigan	1	2023
Sault College	1	2019
Aquinas College	1	2017
Oakland	1	2016
Michigan State	1	2015
College of the Canyons	1	2011
California University (PA)	1	2008
Kennesaw State	1	2007
Wright State	1	2006
Colorado	1	2005
Calvin	1	2004
Muskegon College	1	2003
Robert Morris (PA)	1	2002
Wyoming	1	2001
Butler	1	2000

== Women's champions ==
=== Division 1 champions (W) ===
Year	National Champion	Runner up	Location
2000–2001	St. Cloud State	Arizona State	Wentzville, MO
2001–2002	Wisconsin	St. Cloud State	Alpharetta, GA
2002–2003	Michigan State	Wisconsin	Muskegon, MI
2003–2004	Wisconsin	Rhode Island	East Lansing, MI
2004–2005	Robert Morris (IL)	Michigan State	Buffalo, NY
2005–2006	Lindenwood	Robert Morris (IL)	Wentzville, MO
2006–2007	Robert Morris (IL)	Lindenwood	Amherst, MA
2007–2008	Lindenwood	Robert Morris (IL)	Bensenville, IL
2008–2009	Lindenwood	Robert Morris (IL)	Rochester, NY
2009–2010	Lindenwood	Michigan State	Blaine, MN
2010–2011	Michigan State	Northeastern	Kalamazoo, MI
2011–2012	Northeastern	Minnesota	Wooster, OH
2012–2013	Minnesota	Liberty	Ashburn, VA
2013–2014	Miami University	Massachusetts	Newark, DE
2014–2015	Liberty	Miami University	York, PA
2015–2016	Miami University	Grand Valley State	Kalamazoo, MI
2016–2017	Miami University	Liberty	Columbus, OH
2017–2018	Liberty	Adrian College	Columbus, OH
2018–2019	Liberty	Lindenwood-Belleville	Frisco, TX
2019–2020	Tournament not played ^{†}		Frisco, TX
2020-2021	Liberty	Lindenwood	Minot, ND
2021-2022	Liberty	Midland	St. Louis, MO
2022-2023	Liberty	Minot State	Marlborough, MA
2023-2024	Adrian College	Minot State	Boston, MA
2024-2025	Liberty	Maryville	St. Louis, MO

Totals
Team	Titles	Years
Liberty	7	2015, 2018, 2019, 2021, 2022, 2023, 2025
Lindenwood	4	2006, 2008, 2009, 2010
Miami University	3	2014, 2016, 2017
Michigan State	2	2003, 2011
Robert Morris (IL)	2	2005, 2007
Wisconsin	2	2002, 2004
Adrian College	1	2024
Minnesota	1	2013
Northeastern	1	2012
St. Cloud State	1	2001

==== Results by school and year ====
37 teams have appeared in the ACHA Tournament in at least one year starting with 2001 (the first year that the ACHA sponsored a women's division). The results for all years are shown in this table below.

The code in each cell represents the furthest the team made it in the respective tournament:

- Pool Round
- Quarterfinals
- Semifinals
- 2 National Runner-Up
- 1 National Champion

	APP	01	02	03	04	05	06	07	08	09	10	11	12	13	14	15	16	17	18	19	20^{†}
School																					
Michigan State	17		5	1	3	2	4	5	5	3	2	1	5	7	8			7	5	5	6
Massachusetts	16			4		7	9	8	4	6	8	7	4	4	2	6	5	4	7		5
Michigan	13	5	6			11	7	10	7	8		8	8	8	7	5	8				
Rhode Island	12				2	4	3	3	3	5	4	4	6	6	4		7				
Robert Morris (IL)	11				6	1	2	1	2	2	3	5	3	3	5						
Liberty	11									7	6		7	2	3	1	3	2	1	1	1
Minnesota	10					9	10	11	6	4			2	1		8		8	8		
Colorado	9	3	7		4	3	8		12	10									4		8
Lindenwood	8				5	5	1	2	1	1	1	3									
Grand Valley State	7									11	5	6				3	2	6		6	
Penn State	7	8	3	8	7			12			7					7					
Adrian	7														6	4	4	3	2	3	4
Wisconsin	6	6	1	2	1				8	9											
Western Michigan	6			6	9	6	6	9	10												
Miami	6														1	2	1	1	3	4	
Lindenwood–Belleville	5																6	5	6	2	3
St. Cloud State	4	1	2	7				6													
Northern Michigan	4			5	10	10			11												
Northeastern	3											2	1	5							
Maryland	2	4					12														
West LA College	2			3	8																
Connecticut	2						5	4													
McKendree	2																			7	7
Arizona State	1	2																			
Pittsburgh	1	7																			
Boston University	1		4																		
Bates College	1		8																		
Iowa State	1				11																
Pennsylvania	1				12																
North Country CC	1					8															
Buffalo	1					12															
North Dakota State	1						11														
Norwich	1							7													
Nichols	1								9												
Ohio State	1									12											
Midland	1																			8	
Minot State	1																				2

† Tournament canceled due to the COVID-19 pandemic. Number shown is the team's final regular season ranking/seeding.

=== Division 2 champions (W) ===
Year	National Champion	Runner up	Location
2006–2007	St. Scholastica	Minnesota-Duluth	Amherst, MA
2007–2008	Rainy River CC	Minnesota-Duluth	Bensenville, IL
2008–2009	Rainy River CC	St. Scholastica	Rochester, NY
2009–2010	Northeastern	Rainy River CC	Blaine, MN
2010–2011	Rainy River CC	West Chester	Kalamazoo, MI
2011–2012	Wisconsin–Stout	Alaska	Wooster, OH
2012–2013	West Chester	Penn State	Ashburn, VA
2013–2014	Iowa State	Penn State	Newark, DE
2014–2015	North Dakota State	West Chester	York, PA
2015–2016	Minnesota–Duluth	Rainy River CC	Kalamazoo, MI
2016–2017	Lakehead	North Dakota State	Columbus, OH
2017–2018	Lakehead	Minot State	Columbus, OH
2018–2019	Assiniboine CC	Minot State	Frisco, TX
2019–2020	Tournament not played ^{†}		Frisco, TX
2020-2021	Tournament not played ^{†}		N/A
2021-2022	Assiniboine CC	Dakota College	St. Louis, MO
2022-2023	Sault College	Northeastern	Marlborough, MA
2023-2024	Sault College	Assiniboine CC	Boston, MA
2024-2025	Sault College	Assiniboine CC	St. Louis, MO
2025-2026	Sault College	Assiniboine CC	St. Louis, MO

Totals
Team	Titles	Years
Sault College	4	2023, 2024, 2025, 2026
Rainy River CC	3	2008, 2009, 2011
Assiniboine CC	2	2019, 2022
Lakehead	2	2017, 2018
Minnesota-Duluth	1	2016
North Dakota State	1	2015
Iowa State	1	2014
West Chester	1	2013
Wisconsin–Stout	1	2012
Northeastern	1	2010
St. Scholastica	1	2007

==== Results by school and year ====
37 teams have appeared in the ACHA Tournament in at least one year starting with 2007, the first year for Women's Division 2. The results for all years are shown in this table below, other than missing data for the third-place games from 2007 and 2009.

The code in each cell represents the furthest the team made it in the respective tournament:

- Pool Round
- Semifinals
- 2 National Runner-Up
- 1 National Champion

	APP	07	08	09	10	11	12	13	14	15	16	17	18	19	20^{†}
School															
Delaware	10		4		3	6	3	8	8	6	5	6	7		
North Dakota State	8							7	3	1	3	2	4	6	4W
Rainy River CC	8		1	1	2	1	5			3	2				
Minnesota–Duluth	6	2	2			3		6			1	5			
California (PA)	5						6	5	4	5	8				
Buffalo	5									8	7	10	8	5	
Northeastern	4				1									8	4NE
West Chester	4					2		1		2	6				
Northern Michigan	4									7	4	3			3W
Lakehead	4											1	1	4	2W
Boston College	4											9	5	7	1NE
South Dakota State	3				5	4									
St. Scholastica	3	1		2	4										
Alaska	3						2	3	6						
Minot State	3											4	2	2	
Assiniboine CC	3												6	1	1W
Vermont	2				6										3NE
Wisconsin–Stout	2						1	4							
Penn State	2							2	2						
Iowa State	2								1					11	
Michigan State	2								7	4					
Navy	2											8			4SE
Bishop's	2												3	3	
Adrian	2												9	10	
Liberty	2												10		2SE
Mercyhurst	2													9	3SE
Rowan	2													12	1SE
Bates College	1		3												
Pennsylvania	1														2NE
Connecticut	1					5									
Slippery Rock	1						4								
Wisconsin–La Crosse	1								5						
Miami	1											7			
Aquinas	1											11			
Villanova	1											12			
Loyola Chicago	1												11		
Montclair State	1												12		
New Hampshire	1														2NE

† Tournament canceled due to the COVID-19 pandemic. Number shown is the team's final regular season ranking/seeding.

=== Zoë M. Harris Award winners ===
The Zoë M. Harris Award is given to the player of the year in each ACHA women's division.

Year	Division 1		Division 2	
Year	Player	School	Player	School
2000–2001	Jennifer Horton	Arizona State		
2001–2002	Andrea Lavelle	Penn State		
2002–2003	Erin Ficken	Wisconsin		
2003–2004	Stephanie Metcalf	Colorado		
2004–2005	Krista Sleen	Robert Morris (IL)		
2005–2006	Kat Hannah	Lindenwood		
2006–2007	Savannah Varner	Robert Morris (IL)	Natalie Domagala	South Dakota State
2007–2008	Kat Hannah	Lindenwood		
2008–2009	Maura Grainger	Massachusetts		
2009–2010	Becca Bernet	Lindenwood	Natalie Domagala	South Dakota State
2010–2011	Danielle McCutcheon	Robert Morris (IL)	Brenley Anderson	Rainy River CC
2011–2012	Ramey Weaver	Robert Morris (IL)	Brie Scolaro	Delaware
2012–2013	Cassie Catlow	Rhode Island	Becky Dobson	West Chester
2013–2014	Hayley Williams	Robert Morris (IL)	Kacie Johnson	North Dakota State
2014–2015	Hayley Williams	Miami University	Kacie Johnson	North Dakota State
2015–2016	Brittani Lanzilli	Massachusetts	Sam Jenkins	Central Michigan
2016–2017	Kaley Mooney	Miami University	Allison Carlson	Northern Michigan
2017–2018	Maddie Wolsmann	Michigan State	Mackenzie Balogh	Minot State
2018–2019	Lauren McDonald	Liberty	Madeline Norton	Buffalo
2019–2020	Maddie Wolsmann	Michigan State	Meghan Roche	Mercyhurst

== Notable players in professional leagues ==
=== Men ===
Player	Position	ACHA Team	Years	Professional Organizations Signed With	Years
Daniel Walcott	D	Lindenwood (M1)	2012–2013	Selected #140 overall in the 5th round of the 2014 NHL entry draft by the New York Rangers Tampa Bay Lightning (NHL)	2014-present
Michael Lebler	F	Iowa State (M1)	2007–2011	EHC Black Wings Linz (Erste Bank Eishockey Liga)	2003–2013
Anton Lidemar	F	Lindenwood (M1)	2009–2010	Başkent Yıldızları SK (Turkish Hockey SuperLig	2010–2011
Adam Kubalski	G	UCLA (M2)	2003–2007	KH Sanok, KH Zagłębie Sosnowiec, KTH Krynica (Polish Hockey Superleague)	2007–2010
Justin Depretis	F	Penn State (M1)	2001–2006	Wheeling Nailers (ECHL), Pittsburgh Penguins (NHL), Wichita Thunder (CHL), Indiana Ice Miners (MAHL), Flint Generals (IHL),	2006–2009
Tom Boudreau	F	Robert Morris-Illinois (M2)	2001–2005	Huddinge IK (Swedish Division 1), Indiana Ice Miners (MAHL), Reading Royals (ECHL), Bakersfield Condors (ECHL), Wichita Thunder (CHL), Jersey Rockhoppers (EPHL), Mississippi Surge (SPHL), Dayton Gems (CHL)	2006–2014
Curtiss Patrick	D	Penn State (M1)	2001–2004	Johnstown Chiefs (ECHL), Wheeling Nailers (ECHL), Wilkes-Barre/Scranton Penguins (AHL), Pittsburgh Penguins (NHL), Wichita Thunder (CHL)	2004–2009
Glenn Detulleo	F	Iowa State (M1)	2000–2001	Essen Mosquitoes (Oberliga), Berlin Capitals (Oberliga), Missouri River Otters (UHL), Quad City Mallards (UHL), Vancouver Canucks (NHL), Kalamazoo Wings (IHL), Elmira Jackals (UHL), Wichita Thunder (CHL), Mississippi RiverKings (CHL), Huntsville Havoc (SPHL)	1995–2012
Mark Scally	G	Penn State (M1)	1996–2000	Wheeling Nailers (ECHL), Wilkes-Barre/Scranton Penguins (AHL), Pittsburgh Penguins (NHL), Asheville Smoke (UHL), Johnstown Chiefs (ECHL), Texas Wildcatters (ECHL), Asheville Aces (SPHL), Long Beach Ice Dogs (ECHL)	2000–2006
Cody Stackmann-Staves	D	Pitt-Greensburg (M3)	2011–2013	Steel City Warriors (FHL)	2014–Present
Ryan Lowe	G	San Jose State (M2)	2002–2007	Utah Grizzlies (ECHL), San Jose Sharks (NHL), Canberra Knights (AiHL)	2007–2015
Justin Barr	C	Northern Kentucky (M3)	2006–2008	Elmira Jackals (ECHL), Buffalo Sabres (NHL), Danville Dashers (FHL), Utah Grizzlies (ECHL) Anaheim Ducks (NHL), Cincinnati Cyclones (ECHL), Cape Cod Bluefins (FHL), Fayetteville FireAntz (SPHL)	2008–2014
Jonathan Juliano	C	Davenport (M1)	2010–2011	Augusta RiverHawks (SPHL), Orlando Solar Bears (ECHL), Minnesota Wild (NHL), Danville Dashers (FHL), Dayton Demonz (FHL), Watertown Privateers (FHL),	2011–Present
Mike Sellitto	RW	Florida Gulf Coast University (M2)	2007–2010	Louisiana Ice Gators (SPHL), Danbury Whalers (FHL), Kalamazoo Wings (ECHL), Bridgeport Sound Tigers (AHL), New York Islanders (NHL)	2010–2012
Paul Kenny	G	Rhode Island (M1)	2010–2013	Providence Bruins (AHL), Boston Bruins (NHL)	2013–Present
Tim Boyle	D	Endicott College (M2)	2014–2015	Wichita Thunder (ECHL), Ottawa Senators (NHL), Selected #106 overall in the 4th round of the 2012 NHL entry draft by the Ottawa Senators	2015–Present
Austyn Roudebush	G	Adrian College (M1)	2014-18	Viking HC (SWE Div. 2), Tulsa Oilers (ECHL), Roanoke Rail Yard Dawgs (SPHL). Second winningest goalie in SPHL history.	2018-present
Cesare Dall'Ara	G	Kent State University (M1)	2012–2015	Hc Neumarkt (Serie B), Sc Auer (Serie B)	2015–Present
Ryan Minkoff	F	University of Washington (M2)	2010–2014	Virkiä (2. Divisioona)	2015–2016
Dakota Bohn	D	Adrian College (M1)	2019-23	Roanoke Rail Yard Dawgs (SPHL), Binghamton Black Bears (FPHL). 2 time FPHL Champion, FPHL defenseman of the year.	2023-2025

=== Women ===
Player	Position	ACHA Team(s)	Years	Professional Organizations Signed With	Years
Chelsea Bräm	F	Massachusetts (W1)	2010–2014	SC Reinach (Swiss Women's Hockey League A)	2014–present
Raschelle Bräm	F	Massachusetts (W1)	2010–2014	SC Reinach (Swiss Women's Hockey League A)	2014–present
Sydney Collins	F	Rhode Island (W1)	2011–2016	Boston Blades (CWHL): Selected #69 overall in the 19th round of the 2016 CWHL Draft by the Boston Blades	2016
Cassie Dunne	D	Penn State (W1)	2013–2017	Connecticut Whale (PHF); Metropolitan Riveters (PHF)	2017–2018; 2019–present
Emily Ford	F	Vermont (W1)	2013–2016	Neuberg Highlanders (Elite Women's Hockey League)	2016–2017
Katherine Hannah	F	Lindenwood (W1)	2003–2008	Ottawa Raiders (NWHL I)	2000–2001
Paige Harrington	D	Penn State (W1), 2011–12; Massachusetts (W1), 2012–15	2011–2015	Buffalo Beauts (PHF), 2015–17: 2016–17 Isobel Cup champion; Boston Pride (PHF), 2017–18	2015–18
Andrea Lavelle	F	Penn State (W1)	1998–2002	Beatrice Aeros (NWHL I)	2002–2003
Kristen Levesque	F	Rhode Island (W1)	2012–2016	Boston Blades (CWHL): Selected #70 overall in the 20th round of the 2016 CWHL Draft by the Boston Blades	2016–2017
Madeline Norton	F	Buffalo (W2)	2015–2019	Buffalo Beauts (PHF)	2019–present
Sarah Stevenson	F	Liberty (W1)	2011–2015	Toronto Furies (CWHL): Selected #17 overall in the 4th round of the 2015 CWHL Draft by the Toronto Furies	2015–2016
Hayley Williams	F	Robert Morris (IL) (W1), 2013–14; Miami University (W1), 2014–15	2013–2015	Buffalo Beauts (PHF), 2015–16: 2015–16 NWHL All-Star Game selection; Brampton Thunder (CWHL), 2016–17; Toronto Furies (CWHL), 2017–18; SK Gorny (Russian Women's Hockey League) 2018–present	2015–present

== See also ==
- British Columbia Intercollegiate Hockey League
- National Collegiate Hockey Association
