= Mid-Atlantic Collegiate Hockey Association =

Club hockey conference in the Southeastern US

- Conference: ACHA
- Founded: 1997
- Commissioner: Jeff Pelus
- Sports fielded: Men's ice hockey
- Division: Division II
- No. of teams: 5
- Region: Southeast
- Most recent champions: Rider (2nd title)
- Most titles: Wagner & UMBC (4 titles)
- Website: Official website

The Mid-Atlantic Collegiate Hockey Association (MACH) was a college ice hockey league based in the Southeastern region of the United States. The conference was part of the American Collegiate Hockey Association Division 2 and finished the 2022-2023 season with five teams from colleges and universities based in Delaware, Maryland, New Jersey and Pennsylvania.

== Format ==
Each team plays every team in their division twice throughout the season. Only divisional games are counted towards standings. All five teams, regardless of point total, are eligible to qualify for league playoffs. The 4th and 5th seeds play in a wildcard match, to see who advances to the playoffs. The two winners of the semifinal games meet to determine the league championship. League and non-conference games are taken into consideration to qualify for the ACHA Division II Regional & National Tournaments. At the end of the 2022-2023 season, it was announced that the league would fold due to undisclosed reasons.

== Member clubs ==
Of the five member schools, four compete at the Division I level of NCAA and one at Division III. Stevenson University joined the conference in 2017 following the launch of its own club men's ice hockey program.

School	Location	Nickname	Primary conference	Website	Team colors
University of Delaware	Newark, DE	Blue Hens	CAA (DI)		
Drexel University	Philadelphia, PA	Dragons	CAA (DI)		
University of Maryland	College Park, MD	Terrapins	Big Ten (DI)		
Rider University	Lawrenceville, NJ	Broncs	MAAC (DI)		
Stevenson University	Stevenson, MD	Mustangs	MAC (DII)		

Note: Stevenson has an NCAA Division III hockey team competing in the UCHC

=== Conference arenas ===
School	Home arena	Location	Capacity
Delaware	Fred Rust Ice Arena	Newark, Delaware	2,500
Drexel	Class of 1923 Arena	Philadelphia, Pennsylvania	2,500
Maryland	The Gardens Ice House	Laurel, Maryland	1,500
Rider	Ice Land Skating Center	Lawrenceville, New Jersey	1,000
Stevenson	Reisterstown Sportsplex	Reisterstown, Maryland	

== Former members ==
- Army moved to the SECHL in 2018
- Monmouth University moved to the CSCHC; folded their program in 2022
- St. Joseph's University moved to the ACCHL
- Temple University moved to ACHA Division I
- UMBC folded their program in 2017, rebirthed in 2019 in DVCHC; now in the ACCHL
- Virginia Tech moved to the ACCHL
- Wagner College folded their program in 2018
- Millersville University Currently in the CSCHC
- Montclair State University moved to the SECHL
- The College of New Jersey Joined GNCHC, then moved to the CSCHC in 2014; now ACHA Division I
- Princeton University Joined GNCHC, then moved to the CSCHC in 2014; now in the ACCHL
- University of Pennsylvania Joined GNCHC, then moved to the CSCHC in 2014
- William Paterson University moved to the SECHL; now in ACHA Division I
- Seton Hall University Joined GNCHC, then moved to the CSCHC in 2014
- Lafayette College Joined GNCHC, then moved to the DVCHC of the AAU
- East Carolina University Currently in the ACCHL
- Kennesaw State University Currently in College Hockey South of the AAU
- Penn State Currently in the ACCHL
- Rowan University Currently in the ACCHL
- Liberty University Currently ACHA Division II Independent
- Rider University Currently in the ACCHL
- Stevenson University Currently in the ACCHL
- University of Delaware Currently in the ACCHL
- University of Maryland Currently in the ACCHL
- Drexel University Currently in the CSCHC

== Past champions ==
Season	Regular season	Playoff runner up	Playoff champion	Tournament site
1998-1999	Rider (1)	Rider (1)	Monmouth (1)	Iceland, Hamilton NJ
1999-2000	Rider (2)	Monmouth (1)	Rider (1)	Jersey Shore Arena
2000-2001	Montclair State (1)	Rider (2)	Montclair State (1)	Flyers SkateZone
2001-2002	Pennsylvania (1)	Rider (3)	Pennsylvania (1)	IceWorks Skating Complex
2002-2003	Rider (3)	Rider (4)	Montclair State (2)	IceWorks Skating Complex
2003-2004	Wagner (1)	Princeton (1)	Wagner (1)	Vineland Ice Arena
2004-2005	Wagner (2)	Wagner (1)	Princeton (1)	Vineland Ice Arena
2005-2006			Wagner (2)	
2006-2007	Wagner (3)	UMBC (1)	Wagner (3)	Ice Vault Arena
2007-2008	William Paterson (1)	William Paterson (1)	Wagner (4)	Ice Vault Arena
2008-2009	Wagner (4)	Wagner (2)	UMBC (1)	Loucks Ice Center
2009-2010	UMBC (1)	Rider (5)	UMBC (2)	Loucks Ice Center

Season	North Div. (reg. season)	South Div. (reg. Season)	North champion (playoffs)	South champion (playoffs)	MACH champion (playoffs)	Tournament site
2010-2011			UMBC	Virginia Tech	UMBC (3)	Loucks Ice Center
2011-2012	Penn State	UMBC	Penn State	UMBC	Penn State (1)	York City Ice Arena
2012-2013	Penn State	UMBC	Penn State	Virginia Tech	Virginia Tech (1)	LaHaye Ice Center
2013-2014					UMBC (4)	Ice World
2014-2015	Penn State	Liberty	Rowan	Delaware	Delaware (1)	Ice World
2015-2016	Penn State	Liberty	Rider	Delaware	Delaware (2)	Fred Rust Ice Arena
2016-2017	Penn State	Liberty	Penn State	Liberty	Liberty (1)	Fred Rust Ice Arena
2017-2018	Penn State	Liberty	Penn State	Liberty	Penn State (2)	Flyers Skate Zone
2018-2019	Penn State	Liberty	Penn State	Liberty	Penn State (3)	Fred Rust Ice Arena

Season	Regular season	Playoff Runner Up	Playoff Champion	Tournament site
2019-2020	Liberty (1)	Rowan (1)	Liberty (2)	Ice Land Arena
2020-2021			COVID-19	
2021-2022	Liberty (2)	Rider (6)	Liberty (3)	Ice Land Arena
2022-2023	Rider (4)	Maryland (1)	Rider (2)	Ice Land Arena

== See also ==
- Collegiate Hockey Federation https://www.chfhockey.net/
- American Collegiate Hockey Association
- List of ice hockey leagues
