= Penn Quakers men's ice hockey =

- University: University of Pennsylvania
- Conference: ACHA
- Head coach: Daniel Harkins
- Arena: Class of 1923 Arena; Philadelphia, Pennsylvania
- Colors: Red and blue

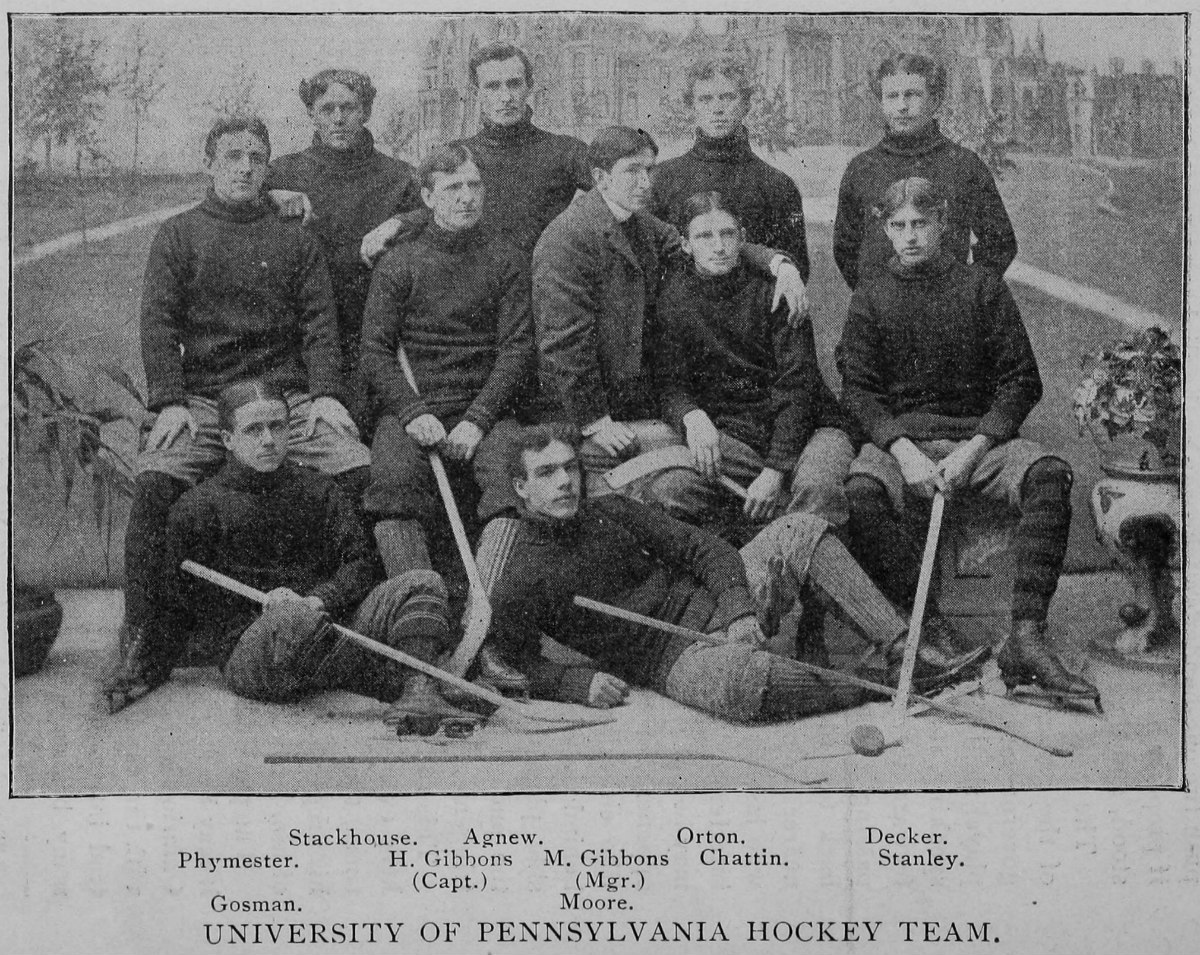
Univ. of Penn team in 1896–97, its first season of existence. Top row, from left: Arthur Stackhouse, William Agnew, George Orton, Clinton Decker. Middle row, from left: William Phymister, Horace Gibbons, Miles Gibbons, John Chattin, Stanley Willett. Bottom row, from left: John Gosman, Arthur Moore.

The Penn Quakers Men's Ice Hockey team represents the University of Pennsylvania in the American Collegiate Hockey Association Division II. Penn is a member of the Colonial States College Hockey Conference. The Quakers play at the Class of 1923 Arena in Philadelphia, Pennsylvania.

== History ==
Penn's first ice hockey team formed for the 1896–97 season. It began competing in the Intercollegiate Hockey Association (IHA), which included only 4 teams (the other three being Yale, Brown and Columbia), in 1898–99. On the first team in 1896–97 were several players of Canadian background, among them middle-distance runner George Orton. Early years were plagued by the lack of a local rink which forced the program to be suspended multiple times. In 1920 the Philadelphia Ice Palace opened, giving the team a more stable footing to operate, however, the lack of success on ice was evident. Despite growing popularity, the team was forced to fold in 1924 due to insufficient funding. In 1941, Penn re-entered the hockey world, competing in the Eastern Collegiate Hockey League and winning the league title that year. The Quakers continued to compete until the team was forced to dissolve as a result of World War II. Penn's hockey program was resurrected in the 1950s as a club team and became gradually more competitive until eventually reaching the varsity level in 1965.

Penn played at the varsity level for the first time in the 1965–66 season, finishing 16–8. To support the team, in 1968, a group of donors and the Class of 1923 joined to fund the construction of the Class of 1923 Arena. In the 1970–71 season, the Quakers made the ECAC playoffs for the first time. The team would have similar success in the following season. The 1972–73 season was filled with similar success under a new coach, Bob Crocker, even beating defending national champion Boston University 7–3 in the first round of the ECAC tournament in Boston. Crocker had been an assistant coach at BU before coming to Penn.

Following the success of the 1972–73 season, the team began a downward spiral. The university began to tighten the team's budget, which made recruiting more difficult and caused the level of play to decline. After the 1977–78 season, Penn's athletic department announced a plan to drop the hockey team's varsity status, along with that of the gymnastics, golf, and badminton teams, citing budgetary restraints. A 4-day sit-in resulted in an agreement between students and administration to preserve some of the cut programs, but not the varsity hockey team.

Since falling from the varsity level, the Penn Quakers men's ice hockey team has maintained its status as a club team. During this period, the team has enjoyed numerous successes, including several championship appearances and victories. Today, the team competes in the ACHA Division II and continues to call the Class of 1923 Arena its home.

On July 9, 2019, a university-supported endowment for both the men's and women's ice hockey programs was announced. This was later further explained in the team's "2025 Vision" plan, which included a road map for the team to follow from ACHA Division II to NCAA Division I by the year 2025. At the time there was no plan to promote either program to the Division I level.

== Season-by-season results ==
=== Varsity ===
Note: GP = Games played, W = Wins, L = Losses, T = Ties, OTL = Overtime Losses (Games lost in either Overtime or Shootout), Pts = Points

NCAA D-I Champions	NCAA Frozen Four	Conference Regular Season Champions	Conference Playoff Champions

Season	Conference	Regular Season											Conference Tournament Results	National Tournament Results
Season	Conference	Conference						Overall					Conference Tournament Results	National Tournament Results
Season	Conference	GP	W	L	T	Pts*	Finish	GP	W	L	T	%	Conference Tournament Results	National Tournament Results
No coach
1896–97	Independent	–	–	–	–	–	–	1	1	0	0	1.000		
1897–98	Independent	–	–	–	–	–	–	11	6	3	2	.636		
1898–99 ^{¿}	IHA	3	2	1	0	.667	2nd	5	3	2	0	.667		
Program suspended due to rink maintenance
1900–01 ^{¿}	IHA	4	0	4	0	.000	5th	6	1	5	0	.167		
Program suspended due to rink burning down
1908–09	Independent	–	–	–	–	–	–	6	0	5	1	.083		
1909–10	Independent	–	–	–	–	–	–	2	2	0	0	1.000		
1910–11	Independent	–	–	–	–	–	–	1	0	1	0	.000		
Program suspended due to lack of ice
George Orton (1919–1922)
1919–20	Independent	–	–	–	–	–	–	7	1	5	1	.214		
1920–21	Independent	–	–	–	–	–	–	9	3	5	1	.389		
Frank Winters (1922)
1921–22	Independent	–	–	–	–	–	–	8 ^{†}	3 ^{†}	5 ^{†}	0 ^{†}	.375 ^{†}		
Eddie Powers (1922–1924)
1922–23	Independent	–	–	–	–	–	–	7	1	5	1	.214		
1923–24	Independent	–	–	–	–	–	–	8	1	5	2	.250		
Program suspended due to lack of funding
Normand Shay/Percy Fynan (1928–1929)
1928–29	Independent	–	–	–	–	–	–	13 ^{‡}	2 ^{‡}	10 ^{‡}	1 ^{‡}	.192 ^{‡}		
Herb Gardiner/William Farson (1929–1930)
1929–30	Independent	–	–	–	–	–	–	11 ^{¡}	4 ^{¡}	7 ^{¡}	0 ^{¡}	.364 ^{¡}		
Program suspended due to lack of funding
Jim Salfi (1965–1972)
1965–66	Independent	–	–	–	–	–	–	24	16	8	0	.667		
1966–67	Independent	–	–	–	–	–	–	24	13	11	0	.542		
1967–68	ECAC Hockey	16	1	15	0	.063	17th	24	6	18	0	.250		
1968–69	ECAC Hockey	15	1	14	0	.067	17th	22	7	15	0	.318		
1969–70	ECAC Hockey	15	3	12	0	.200	16th	24	8	16	0	.333		
1970–71	ECAC Hockey	19	11	8	0	.579	7th	25	14	11	0	.560	Lost Quarterfinal, 2–5 (Clarkson)	
1971–72	ECAC Hockey	21	14	7	0	.667	4th	25	16	9	0	.640	Lost Quarterfinal, 3–5 (New Hampshire)	
Bob Crocker (1972–1976)
1972–73	ECAC Hockey	22	13	7	2	.636	4th	27	16	9	2	.630	Won Quarterfinal, 7–3 (Boston University); Lost Semifinal, 3–5 (Boston College); Lost Third Place Game, 0–4 (Clarkson)	
Division I
1973–74	ECAC Hockey	21	9	12	0	.429	10th	24	10	14	0	.417		
1974–75	ECAC Hockey	23	9	13	1	.413	11th	24	10	13	1	.438		
1975–76	ECAC Hockey	23	5	17	1	.239	16th	26	6	19	1	.250		
Bob Finke (1976–1978)
1976–77	ECAC Hockey	24	7	17	0	.292	14th	26	9	17	0	.346		
1977–78	ECAC Hockey	21	5	14	2	.286	16th	26	7	17	2	.308		
Program suspended
Totals								GP	W	L	T	%	Championships	
Regular Season								411	165	231	15	.420		
Conference Post-season								5	1	4	0	.200		
NCAA Post-season								0	0	0	0	–		
Regular Season and Post-season Record								416	166	235	15	.417		

* Winning percentage is used when conference schedules are unbalanced.
¿ Information on the 1898–99 and 1900–01 seasons are incomplete.
† Frank Winters only coached the final game of the 1922 season for the Quakers, a win.
‡ Normand Shay coached the team to an 0–6–1 record before being replaced by Percy Fynan for the second half of the season.
¡ Herb Gardiner coached the team for one loss before turning control over to William Farson.

=== Club ===
ACHA D-II Champions	Conference Regular Season Champions	Conference Playoff Champions

Season	Conference	Regular Season											Conference Tournament Results	National Tournament Results
Season	Conference	Conference						Overall					Conference Tournament Results	National Tournament Results
Season	Conference	GP	W	L	T/OTL	Pts*	Finish	GP	W	L	T/OTL	%	Conference Tournament Results	National Tournament Results
Limited Information Available
Program has been active since the 1979–80 season as a club sport and previous played club hockey from 1939 to 1942 and 1956 to 1965
David Heary (1996–99)
1997–98	DVCHC	16	11	5	0	22	3rd (Note: Southwest DVCHC Division)	24	13	10	1	.563	Lost Southwest Semifinal, 2–4 (Princeton University)	
1998–99	DVCHC	14	4	9	1	9	3rd	25	6	18	1	.260	Lost Southwest Semifinal, 1–9 (Princeton University)	
J.C. Groon (1999–00)
1999–00	DVCHC	17	16	1	0	32	1st (Note: First in both Southeast DVCHC Division and overall in conference)	36	18	17	1	.514	Won Southeast Final, 5–3 (Kutztown University); Won Final Series 2–1, (Temple University)	
1999–00	MACH	12	7	5	0	14	4th	36	18	17	1	.514	Lost Semifinal, 2–5 (Rider University)	
Josh Remick & Dean Winter (2000–01)
2000–01	MACH	16	10	6	0	20	3rd	24	15	9	0	.625	Lost Semifinal, 2–3 (Rider University)	
Dean Winter (2001–03)
2001–02	MACH	14	12	1	1	25	1st	33	20	12	1	.621	Won Semifinal, 4–2 (Princeton University); Won Final, 9–5 (Rider University)	
2002–03	MACH	14	7	4	3	17	4th	25	11	11	3	.500	Won play-in game, 5–1 (Princeton University); Lost Semifinal, 4–6 (Rider University)	
Whit Matthew (2003–04)
2003–04	MACH	16	7	8	1	15	6th	30	14	14	2	.500	Won Quarterfinal, 6–4 (Montclair State University); Lost Semifinal, 5–6 (Wagner College)	
Dave Berger (2004–07)
2004–05	MACH	16	11	4	1	23	3rd	35	22	12	1	.643	Won Quarterfinal, 9–4 (Rider University); Lost Semifinal, 1–3 (Princeton University)	
2005–06	MACH	18	7	7	4	18	5th	35	14	16	5	.471	Lost Quarterfinal, 1–5 (Saint Joseph's University)	ACHA Southeast Regional; Lost Game One, 0–2 (Liberty University); Won Game Two, 3–0 (William Paterson)
2006–07	MACH	18	2	12	4	6	10th	31	7	21	3	.274		
Brian Gallini (2007–08)
2007–08	MACH	18	5	11	2	12	8th	28	12	13	3	.482		
Bob Klein (2008–10)
2008–09	MACH	18	4	14	0	8	9th	28	7	21	0	.250		
2009–10	MACH	16	4	11	1	9	5th (Note: Liberty MACH Division)	27	7	17	3	.315		
2010–11	GNCHC	16	1	15	0	2	6th (Note: Eastern GNCHC Division)	23	1	22	0	.043		
Scott Carmack (2011–22)
2011–12	GNCHC	18	2	14	2	6	5th (Note: Central GNCHC Division)	23	2	18	3	.152		
2012–13	GNCHC	18	4	13	1	9	5th	22	5	16	1	.250		
2013–14	GNCHC	18	7	7	4	18	3rd	23	12	7	4	.609		
2014–15	CSCHC	12	2	9	1	5	7th	22	3	18	1	.159		
2015–16	CSCHC	14	7	7	0	14	5th	18	8	10	0	.444	Won Quarterfinal, 3–2 (Monmouth University); Lost Semifinal, 3–8 (The College of New Jersey)	
2016–17	CSCHC	18	13	5	0	26	3rd	22	16	6	0	.727	Won Quarterfinal, 4–2 (University of Scranton); Lost Semifinal, 0–5 (The College of New Jersey)	
2017–18	CSCHC	18	13	3	2	28	1st	24	16	6	2	.708	Lost Semifinal, 6–7 (OT) (The College of New Jersey)	
2018–19	CSCHC	18	14	3	1	29	2nd	22	16	5	1	.750	Lost Semifinal, 1–2 (The College of New Jersey)	
2019–20	CSCHC	18	15	2	1	31	2nd	21	16	4	1	.786	Won Semifinal, 8–5 (University of Scranton); Lost Final, 2–3 (The College of New Jersey)	
2021–22	CSCHC	20	17	3	0	38	1st	25	21	4	0	.840	Won Semifinal, 6–1 (University of Scranton); Won Final, 6–2 (The College of New Jersey)	ACHA Southeast Regional; Won First Round over #8 University of Kentucky) 6–4; Won Semifinal over #3 North Carolina State University) 4–3; Lost Final to #7 Indiana University Bloomington) 6–0
Alec Artosky (2022–2024)
2022–23	CSCHC	18	17	1	0	30	1st	23	21	2	0	.913	Won Semifinal, 8–1 (Stockton University); Won Final, 10–3 (Millersville University of Pennsylvania)	ACHA Southeast Regional; Won First Round over #8 University of Michigan) 4–3; Lost Semi-Finals to #3 University of Kentucky)
2023–24	CSCHC	16	12	4	0	20	2nd	23	16	7	0	.696	Won Semifinal, 3–2 (Stockton University); Won Final, 12–5 (Millersville University of Pennsylvania)	ACHA Southeast Regional; Won First Round over #8 University of North Carolina at Chapel Hill) 8–6; Lost Semi-Finals to #3 Indiana University Bloomington)
2024-25	CSCHC	14	6	8	0	12	5th	19	6	13	0	.316	Lost Quarterfinal, 7–3 (Stockton University)	
Dan Harkins (2025–)
2025-26	CSCHC	16	7	7	2	16	6th	17	7	7	3	.500	Won Quarterfinal, 4–1 (University of Scranton) Lost Semifinal, 2–5 (West Chester University)	
Totals								GP	W	L	T/OTL	%	Championships	
Regular Season								598	267	295	36	.477	1 DVCHC Championship, 1 MACH Championship, 2 CSCHC Regular Season Championships	
Conference Post-season								22	10	11	1	.477	1 DVCHC Tournament Championship, 1 MACH Tournament Championship, 3 CSCHC Tournament Championships	
ACHA Post-season								7	4	3	0	.571		
Regular Season and Post-season Record								622	278	307	37	.477		

== Quakers in the NHL ==
Player	Position	Team(s)	Years	Games	Stanley Cups
Paul Stewart	Left wing	QUE	1979–1980	21	0
