= Great Northeast Collegiate Hockey Conference =

- Conference: ACHA
- Founded: 2006
- Folded: 2017
- Sports fielded: Men's ice hockey
- Division: Division 2
- Region: Northeast

The Great Northeast Collegiate Hockey Conference (GNCHC) was an ACHA Division II ice hockey league based in the Mid-Atlantic region of the United States. The league was disbanded in 2017.

== Past teams ==
GNCHC members in New Jersey
GNCHC members in Pennsylvania

School	Location	Nickname	Primary conference	Website	Team colors	Current conference (as of 12/15/22)
Bloomsburg University of Pennsylvania	Bloomsburg, PA	Huskies	PSAC (DII)			DVCHC
LIU Post	Brookville, NY	Pioneers	ECC (DII)	N/A		NCAA Division 1 Independent, but in a scheduling partnership with Atlantic Hockey
Kutztown University of Pennsylvania	Kutztown, PA	Golden Bears	PSAC (DII)			ECHC
Lafayette College	Easton, PA	Leopards	Patriot (DI)			DVCHC
La Salle University	Philadelphia, PA	Explorers	A-10 (DI)			Inactive
Muhlenberg College	Allentown, PA	Mules	Centennial (DIII)			Inactive
Susquehanna University	Selinsgrove, PA	Crusaders	Landmark (DIII)			DVCHC
Millersville University of Pennsylvania	Millersville, PA	Marauders	PSAC (DII)			CSCHC
Rowan University	Glassoboro, NJ	Profs	NJAC (DIII)			ACCHL
New Jersey Institute of Technology (NJIT)	Newark, NJ	Highlanders	America East (DI)			MCHC
Princeton University	Princeton, NJ	Tigers	Ivy (DI)			ACCHL
Seton Hall University	South Orange, NJ	Pirates	Big East (DI)			CSCHC
The College of New Jersey (TCNJ)	Ewing, NJ	Lions	NJAC (DIII)			NECHL
University of Pennsylvania	Philadelphia, PA	Quakers	Ivy (DI)			CSCHC
West Chester University	West Chester, PA	Golden Rams	PSAC (DII)			CSCHC
Rutgers University	New Brunswick, NJ	Scarlet Knights	Big Ten (DI)			MCHC
University of Scranton	Scranton, PA	Royals	Landmark (DIII)			CSCHC
Gettysburg College	Gettysburg, PA	Bullets	Centennial (DIII)			DVCHC
Franklin & Marshall	Lancaster, PA	Dipolmats	Centennial (DIII)			DVCHC
Bucknell	Lewisburg, PA	Bisons	Patriot League (DI)			DVCHC

== Past seasons ==
Season	Playoff Champions	Playoff Runner-up	Regular season champions
2006–2007	Muhlenberg (1)	Rowan (1)	
2007–2008	Rowan (1)	TCNJ (1)	TCNJ (1)
2008–2009	Scranton (1)	Muhlenberg (1)	
2009–2010	C.W. Post (1)	Scranton (1)	
2010–2011	NJIT (1)	Muhlenberg (2)	
2011–2012	TCNJ (1)	Millersville (1)	Millersville (1)
2012–2013	Kutztown (1)	Millersville (2)	Kutztown (1)
2013–2014	TCNJ (2)	Millersville (3)	Millersville (2)
2014–2015	La Salle (1)	Lafayette (1)	Kutztown (2)
2015–2016	Rutgers (1)	Scranton (2)	
2016–2017	Bloomsburg (1)	Kutztown (1)	Bloomsburg (1)

== See also ==
- List of ice hockey leagues
