= Atlantic Coast Collegiate Hockey League =

U.S. collegiate hockey league

- Founded: 1995
- Commissioner: Mike Walley (since 2012)
- Division: ACHA / AAU
- No. of teams: 96
- Headquarters: North Carolina
- Region: Southeast
- Website: Official website

The Atlantic Coast Collegiate Hockey League (ACCHL) is a non-NCAA collegiate ice hockey league in the mid-atlantic and southeast regions of the United States. The Mission of the ACC Hockey League is to provide student-athletes an option to compete in organized intercollegiate ice hockey without the high expenses of NCAA level hockey.

All teams in Men's Division I compete out of the ACHA. All teams in Men's Division II compete out of the ACHA Southeast Region in Division II with some being dual within Division II of the AAU. All teams in the Women's Division compete out of the ACHA Southeast Region in Division II. All teams in Men's Division II 'A' compete in the AAU as part of the Division III level with some being dual within Division III of the ACHA. All teams in Men's Division III compete in the AAU as part of the FED Division. Mike "Sheriff" Walley is the current executive director of the league.

Liberty became the first school from the conference to win a National Championship, winning the 2026 AAU Men's Division III title.

== Current members ==
=== Men's Division I ===
Division	Institution	Location	Nickname	Arena	Team colors	Primary conference
North Division	University of Delaware	Newark, DE	Blue Hens	Fred Rust Ice Arena		CUSA (D-I)
North Division	Niagara University	Lewiston, NY	Purple Eagles	Dwyer Arena		MAAC (D-I)
North Division	University of Pittsburgh	Pittsburgh, PA	Panthers	Alpha Ice Complex		ACC (D-I)
North Division	Stony Brook University	Stony Brook NY	Seawolves	The Rinx		CAA (D-I)
North Division	State University of New York at Oswego (SUNY Oswego)	Oswego, NY	Lakers	Deborah F. Stanley Arena		SUNYAC (D-III)
North Division	Syracuse University	Syracuse, NY	Orange	Tennity Ice Skating Pavilion		ACC (D-I)
South Division	University of Alabama	Tuscaloosa, AL	Crimson Tide	Pelham Civic Center		SEC (D-I)
South Division	University of Cincinnati	Cincinnati, OH	Bearcats	Queen City Sportsplex		Big 12 (D-I)
South Division	University of Kentucky	Lexington, KY	Wildcats	Lexington Ice Center		SEC (D-I)
South Division	University of Louisville	Louisville, KY	Cardinals	Iceland Sports Complex		ACC (D-I)
South Division	University of North Carolina at Chapel Hill	Chapel Hill, NC	Tar Heels	Orange County Sportsplex		ACC (D-I)
South Division	North Carolina State University	Raleigh, NC	Wolfpack	Wake Competition Center		ACC (D-I)

=== Men's Division II ===
Division	Institution	Location	Nickname	Arena	Team colors	Primary conference
Premier - Central Division	University of Maryland	College Park, MD	Terrapins	The Gardens Ice House		Big Ten (DI)
Premier - Central Division	Virginia Tech	Blacksburg, VA	Hokies	LancerLot Sports Complex		ACC (DI)
Premier - Central Division	West Virginia University	Morgantown, WV	Mountaineers	Mylan Park Ice Pavilion		Big 12 (DI)
Premier - North Division	University of Delaware	Newark, DE	Blue Hens	Fred Rust Ice Arena		CUSA (DI)
Premier - North Division	Rowan University	Glassboro, NJ	Profs	Hollydell Ice Arena		NJAC (DIII)
Premier - North Division	Saint Joseph's University	Philadelphia, PA	Hawks	Haverford Skatium		A-10 (DI)
Premier - South Division	High Point University	High Point, NC	Panthers	Greensboro Ice House		Big South (DI)
Premier - South Division	Wake Forest University	Winston-Salem, NC	Demon Deacons	Winston-Salem Fairgrounds Arena		ACC (DI)
Premier - South Division	University of North Carolina at Wilmington	Wilmington, NC	Seahawks	Polar Ice Wilmington		CAA (DI)
Southeastern Division	University of Alabama	Tuscaloosa, AL	Crimson Tide	Pelham Civic Center		SEC (DI)
Southeastern Division	Auburn University	Auburn, AL	Tigers	Columbus Civic Center		SEC (DI)
Southeastern Division	University of Florida	Gainesville, FL	Gators	Community First Igloo		SEC (DI)
Southeastern Division	University of Georgia	Athens, GA	Bulldogs	Akins Ford Arena		SEC (DI)
Southeastern Division	Louisiana State University	Baton Rouge, LA	Tigers	Planet Ice Lafayette		SEC (DI)
Southeastern Division	University of Mississippi	University, MS	Rebels	Mid-South Ice House		SEC (DI)
Southeastern Division	University of South Carolina	Columbia, SC	Gamecocks	Flight Adventure Park		SEC (DI)
Southeastern Division	University of Tennessee	Knoxville, TN	Volunteers	Knoxville Civic Coliseum		SEC (DI)
Elite - Blue Ridge Division	Duke University	Durham, NC	Blue Devils	Orange County Sportsplex		ACC (DI)
Elite - Blue Ridge Division	Elon University	Elon, NC	Phoenix	Orange County Sportsplex		CAA (DI)
Elite - Blue Ridge Division	Liberty University	Lynchburg, VA	Flames	LaHaye Ice Center		CUSA (DI)
Elite - Blue Ridge Division	University of Richmond	Richmond, VA	Spiders	Richmond Ice Zone		A-10 (DI)
Elite - Blue Ridge Division	University of Virginia	Charlottesville, VA	Cavaliers	SkateNation Plus		ACC (DI)
Elite - Capitol Division	Georgetown University	Washington, D.C.	Hoyas	The Gardens Ice House		Big East (DI)
Elite - Capitol Division	George Mason University	George Mason, VA	Patriots	Prince William Ice Center		A-10 (DI)
Elite - Capitol Division	George Washington University	Washington, D.C.	Revolutionaries	The St. James		A-10 (DI)
Elite - Capitol Division	James Madison University	Harrisonburg, VA	Dukes	Haymarket IcePlex		Sun Belt (DI)
Elite - Delaware Valley Division	Alvernia University	Reading, PA	Golden Wolves	Body Zone Sports & Wellness Complex		MAC (DIII)
Elite - Delaware Valley Division	Kutztown University	Kutztown, PA	Golden Bears	Power Play Rinks		PSAC (DII)
Elite - Delaware Valley Division	Misericordia University	Dallas, PA	Cougars	Toyota Sportsplex		MAC (DIII)
Elite - Delaware Valley Division	Princeton University	Princeton, NJ	Tigers	Baker Rink		Ivy League (DI)
Elite - Palmetto Division	University of North Carolina at Charlotte	Charlotte, NC	49ers	Extreme Ice Center		American (DI)
Elite - Palmetto Division	Clemson University	Clemson, SC	Tigers	Ice Station		ACC (DI)
Elite - Palmetto Division	East Carolina University	Greenville, NC	Pirates	Carolina Ice Zone		American (DI)
Elite - Palmetto Division	Georgia Tech	Atlanta, GA	Yellow Jackets	Atlanta IceForum		ACC (DI)
Elite - Palmetto Division	Saint Thomas University (Florida)	Miami Gardens, FL	Bobcats	Baptist Health IcePlex		TSC (NAIA)

=== Women's Division II ===
Division	Institution	Location	Nickname	Arena	Team colors	Primary conference
North Division	Georgetown University	Washington, D.C.	Hoyas	The Gardens Ice House		Big East (DI)
North Division	George Washington University	Washington, D.C.	Colonials	The St. James		A-10 (DI)
North Division	University of Virginia	Charlottesville, VA	Cavaliers	LaHaye Ice Center		ACC (DI)
North Division	West Chester University	West Chester, PA	Golden Rams	Ice Line Quad Rinks		PSAC (DII)
South Division	High Point University	High Point, NC	Panthers	Greensboro Ice House		Big South (DI)
South Division	University of North Carolina at Chapel Hill	Chapel Hill, NC	Tar Heels	Orange County Sportsplex		ACC (DI)
South Division	North Carolina State University	Raleigh, NC	Wolfpack	Wake Competition Center		ACC (DI)
South Division	Virginia Tech	Blacksburg, VA	Hokies	LancerLot Sports Complex		ACC (DI)

=== Men's Division III ===
Division	Institution	Location	Nickname	Arena	Team colors	Primary conference
M2A - Blue Ridge Division	Appalachian State University	Boone, NC	Mountaineers	Greensboro Ice House		SBC (DI)
M2A - Blue Ridge Division	High Point University	High Point, NC	Panthers	Greensboro Ice House		Big South (DI)
M2A - Blue Ridge Division	Virginia Tech	Blacksburg, VA	Hokies	LancerLot Sports Complex		ACC (DI)
M2A - Blue Ridge Division	Wake Forest University	Winston-Salem, NC	Demon Deacons	Winston-Salem Fairgrounds		ACC (DI)
M2A - Delaware Valley Division	Bucknell University	Lewisburg, PA	Bison	James R. Eister Youth & Community Center		Patriot (DI)
M2A - Delaware Valley Division	Loyola University Maryland	Baltimore, MD	Greyhounds	Reisterstown Sportsplex		Patriot (DI)
M2A - Delaware Valley Division	Rowan University	Glassboro, NJ	Profs	Hollydell Ice Arena		NJAC (DIII)
M2A - Delaware Valley Division	West Chester University	West Chester, PA	Golden Rams	Ice Line Quad Rinks		PSAC (DII)
M2A - Delaware Valley Division	York College of Pennsylvania	Spring Garden Township, PA	Spartans	York Ice Arena		MAC (DIII)
M2A - Eastern Shore Division	University of Maryland, Baltimore County	Catonsville, MD	Retrievers	The Gardens Ice House		AmEast (DI)
M2A - Eastern Shore Division	University of Maryland, College Park	College Park, MD	Terrapins	The Gardens Ice House		Big Ten (DI)
M2A - Eastern Shore Division	Stevenson University	Stevenson, MD	Mustangs	Reisterstown Sportsplex		MAC (DIII)
M2A - Eastern Shore Division	United States Naval Academy	Annapolis, MD	Midshipmen	McMullen Hockey Arena		Patriot (DI)
M2A - Gulf States Division	University of Alabama at Birmingham	Birmingham, AL	Blazers	Pelham Civic Center		American (DI)
M2A - Gulf States Division	University of Alabama in Huntsville	Huntsville, AL	Chargers	Huntsville Ice Sports Center		GSC (DII)
M2A - Gulf States Division	University of North Florida	Jacksonville, FL	Ospreys	Community First Igloo		ASUN (DI)
M2A - Palmetto Division	The Citadel	Charleston, SC	Bulldogs	Carolina Ice Palace		SoCon (DI)
M2A - Palmetto Division	College of Charleston	Charleston, SC	Cougars	Carolina Ice Palace		CAA (DI)
M2A - Palmetto Division	Coastal Carolina University	Conway, SC	Chanticleers	Florence Center		SBC (DI)
M2A - Palmetto Division	Georgia Southern University	Statesboro, GA	Eagles	Ghost Pirates Ice Cove		SBC (DI)
M2A - Tide Water Division	Catholic University of America	Washington, D.C.	Cardinals	Wheaton Ice Arena		Landmark (DIII)
M2A - Tide Water Division	Christopher Newport University	Newport News, VA	Captains	Chilled Ponds Ice Sports Complex		C2C (DIII)
M2A - Tide Water Division	James Madison University	Harrisonburg, VA	Duke	Haymarket IcePlex		Sun Belt (DI)
M2A - Tide Water Division	College of William & Mary	Williamsburg, VA	Tribe	Chilled Ponds Ice Sports Complex		CAA (DI)
Southeastern Division	University of Florida	Gainesville, FL	Gators	Community First Igloo		SEC (DI)
Southeastern Division	University of Georgia	Athens, GA	Bulldogs	Akins Ford Arena		SEC (DI)
Southeastern Division	University of Kentucky	Lexington, KY	Wildcats	Lexington Ice Center		SEC (DI)
Southeastern Division	University of South Carolina	Columbia, SC	Gamecocks	Flight Adventure Park		SEC (DI)
Southeastern Division	University of Tennessee	Knoxville, TN	Volunteers	Knoxville Civic Coliseum		SEC (DI)
M3 - Chesapeake Division	College of Charleston	Charleston, SC	Cougars	Carolina Ice Palace		CAA (DI)
M3 - Chesapeake Division	Johns Hopkins University	Baltimore, MD	Blue Jays	Mt. Pleasant Ice Arena		Centennial (DIII)
M3 - Chesapeake Division	Old Dominion University	Norfolk, VA	Monarchs	Chilled Ponds Ice Sports Complex		SBC (DI)
M3 - Chesapeake Division	Virginia Military Institute	Lexington, VA	Keydets	LaHaye Ice Center		SoCon (DI)
M3 - Delaware Valley Division	Bloomsburg University	Kutztown, PA	Huskies	Toyota SportsPlex		PSAC (DII)
M3 - Delaware Valley Division	Dickinson College	Carlisle, PA	Red Devils	Twin Ponds Arena		Centennial (DIII)
M3 - Delaware Valley Division	Gettysburg College	Gettysburg, PA	Bullets	York Ice Arena		Centennial (DIII)
M3 - Delaware Valley Division	Millersville University	Millersville, PA	Marauders	Lancaster Ice Rink		PSAC (DII)
M3 - Delaware Valley Division	Shippensburg University	Shippensburg, PA	Raiders	Twin Ponds Arena		PSAC (DII)
M3 - Susquehanna Division	Alvernia University	Reading, PA	Golden Wolves	Body Zone Sports & Wellness Complex		MAC (DIII)
M3 - Susquehanna Division	Kutztown University	Kutztown, PA	Golden Bears	Power Play Rinks		PSAC (DII)
M3 - Susquehanna Division	Lafayette College	Easton, PA	Leopards	Steel Ice Center		Patriot (DI)
M3 - Susquehanna Division	Salisbury University	Stevenson, MD	Sea Gulls	Talbot County Ice Rink		C2C (DIII)
M3 - Susquehanna Division	Susquehanna University	Sellinsgrove, PA	River Hawks	Sunbury Ice Rink		Landmark (DIII)
M3 - Susquehanna Division	Widener University	Chester, PA	Pride	IceWorks Skating Complex		MAC (DIII)

== League Expansion ==
- 2010: George Washington, Maryland join Men's Division II
- 2012: Elon joins Men's Division II
- 2013: Navy, Wake Forest join Men's Division II
- 2015: James Madison, Saint Joseph's, UNC Charlotte join Men's Division II
- 2018: West Virginia, UNC Wilmington join Men's Division II
- 2019: Richmond joins Men's Division II
- 2022: Penn State, Rowan join Men's Division II Premier; Denison, East Carolina, Princeton join Men's Division II Elite; Loyola Maryland joins Men's Division III
- 2023: Delaware, Maryland, Rider join Men's Division II Premier; Stevenson joins Men's Division II Elite & Men's Division III; George Mason, West Chester join Men's Division II 'A'; Johns Hopkins, UMBC, Millersville, York College join Men's Division III; High Point (second team) joins Men's Division III
- 2024: High Point (first team) joins Men's Division II Elite; TCNJ, Wake Forest (second team), Widener join Men's Division III; North Carolina & West Chester join the Women's Division
- 2025: The conference announced an ACHA Men's Division I league with teams including Alabama, Louisville, Delaware, Oswego State, Pittsburgh, Stony Brook and Syracuse. North Carolina, North Carolina State join Men's Division I; The conference announced a Men's Southeastern Division (SEC) with teams including Alabama (second team), Auburn, Georgia, Ole Miss, South Carolina, Tennessee; Georgia Tech joins Men's Division II Elite; Georgia (second team) joins Men's Division II 'A'; High Point (first team), Wake Forest (first team), West Virginia are promoted to Men's Division II Premier; Stevenson joins Men's Division II 'A' ; James Madison (second team) joins Men's Division III; Denison departs, joins the TSCHL & TCNJ departs, joins the CSCHC
- 2026: Penn State departs, joins the TSCHL & Rider departs, joins the SECHL; Florida and LSU join Men's Division II in the Southeastern Division; Liberty is promoted to Men's Division II Elite

== Tournament Championships ==
The 2026 ACCHL playoff tournaments features the top eight teams qualifying from the Men's Division I and the M2 Premier Division as the winner is awarded the Admiral's Cup. The M2 Elite Division features the top ten teams qualifying with seeds 7-10 participating in Play-In Games; the winner is awarded the Admiral's Cup. The Women's Division features the top six teams qualifying with seeds 1 & 2 getting a bye into the Semi-Finals; the winner is awarded the Commodore's Cup. The M2A Division features the top twelve teams qualifying with seeds 1-4 receiving first-round byes; the winner is awarded the Commodore's Cup. The M3 Division has the top six teams qualify with the 1 & 2 seeds getting a bye into the Semi-Finals; the winner is awarded the Commissioner's Cup.

Men's Division 1

Year	Admiral's Cup Champion	Runner-up	Regular season champion	Tournament Location
2026	Stony Brook (1)	Syracuse	Pittsburgh (1)	Newark, DE

Men's Division 2 Premier

Year	Admiral's Cup Champion	Runner-up	Regular season champion	Tournament Location
1996	Virginia (1)	North Carolina	Virginia Tech (1)	Fort Bragg, NC
1997	Liberty (1)	North Carolina	Virginia (1)	Charlottesville, VA
1998	Duke (1)	Virginia	Virginia (2)	Charlottesville, VA
1999	Maryland (1)	North Carolina	Virginia (3)	Charlottesville, VA
2000	Virginia (2)	Maryland	Virginia (4)	Ashburn, VA
2001	Maryland (2)	NC State	NC State (1)	Laurel, MD
2002	Liberty (2)	Maryland	NC State (2)	Laurel, MD
2003	NC State (1)	Maryland	NC State (3)	Raleigh, NC
2004	Duke (2)	Virginia	Duke (1)	Charlottesville, VA
2005	Georgetown (1)	Virginia	Virginia (5)	Hillsborough, NC
2006	Duke (3)	Georgetown	Duke (2)	Charlottesville, VA
2007	Georgetown (2)	Duke	Georgetown (1)	Arlington, VA
2008	Georgetown (3)	Duke	Virginia Tech (2)	Roanoke, VA
2009	Virginia Tech (1)	Duke	Virginia Tech (3)	Roanoke, VA
2010	Virginia Tech (2)	Georgetown	Maryland (1)	Arlington, VA
2011	NC State (2)	Maryland	Maryland (2)	Hillsborough, NC
2012	Georgetown (4)	Maryland	Georgetown (2)	Hillsborough, NC
2013	Georgetown (5)	NC State	NC State (4)	Laurel, MD
2014	Georgetown (6)	NC State	NC State (5)	Annapolis, MD
2015	North Carolina (1)	Georgetown	NC State (6)	Annapolis, MD
2016	George Washington (1)	NC State	NC State (7)	Charlottesville, VA
2017	Virginia (3)	NC State	Virginia (6)	Charlottesville, VA
2018	Charlotte (1)	Wake Forest	George Washington (1)	Charlottesville, VA
2019	NC State (3)	Virginia	NC State (8)	Winston-Salem, NC
2020	NC State (4)	Wake Forest	NC State (9)	Winston-Salem, NC
2021	*NC State (5)	Virginia Tech	N/A (COVID)	Winston-Salem, NC
2022	NC State (6)	North Carolina	Virginia Tech (4)	Winston-Salem, NC
2023	Penn State (1)	North Carolina	Penn State (1)	Winston-Salem, NC
2024	Rowan (1)	UNC Wilmington	Rider (1)	Winston-Salem, NC
2025	Penn State (2)	Virginia Tech	Penn State (2)	Winston-Salem, NC
2026	Virginia Tech (3)	Maryland	Rowan (1)	Winston-Salem, NC

Men's Division 2 Elite

Year	Admiral's Cup Champion	Runner-up	Regular season champion	Tournament Location
2023	West Virginia (1)	Charlotte	Saint Joseph's (1)	Winston-Salem, NC
2024	West Virginia (2)	Denison	Denison (1)	Winston-Salem, NC
2025	Wake Forest (1)	West Virginia	High Point (1)	Winston-Salem, NC
2026	Saint Joseph's (1)	Virginia	Saint Joseph's (2)	Winston-Salem, NC

Women's Division 2

Year	Commodore's Cup Champion	Runner-up	Regular season champion	Tournament Location
2022	NC State (1)	West Virginia	West Virginia (1)	Winston-Salem, NC
2023	Georgetown (1)	NC State	Georgetown (1)	Winston-Salem, NC
2024	High Point (1)	Virginia Tech	Virginia (1)	Winston-Salem, NC
2025	High Point (2)	Virginia Tech	High Point (1)	Springfield, VA
2026	High Point (3)	Virginia Tech	High Point (2)	Springfield, VA

Men's Division 2A

Year	Commodore's Cup Champion	Runner-up	Regular season champion	Tournament Location
2020	Christopher Newport (1)	College of Charleston		Chesapeake, MD
2021	*Coastal Carolina (1)	Liberty	N/A (COVID)	Winston-Salem, NC
2022	Coastal Carolina (2)	Liberty	Liberty (1)	Lynchburg, VA
2023	Coastal Carolina (3)	Liberty	Liberty (2)	Winston-Salem, NC
2024	High Point (1)	Rowan	Rowan (1)	Winston-Salem, NC
2025	Liberty (1)	Coastal Carolina	Rowan (2)	Winston-Salem, NC
2026	Liberty (2)	William & Mary	Liberty (3)	Lynchburg, VA

Men's Division 3

Year	Commissioner's Cup Champion	Runner-up	Regular season champion	Tournament Location
2022	William & Mary (1)	Appalachian State	William & Mary (1)	Lynchburg, VA
2023	Loyola Maryland (1)	William & Mary	William & Mary (2)	Winston-Salem, NC
2024	William & Mary (2)	Johns Hopkins	William & Mary (3)	Winston-Salem, NC
2025	William & Mary (3)	The Citadel	William & Mary (4)	Springfield, VA
2026	Johns Hopkins (1)	North Florida	Johns Hopkins (1)	Winston-Salem, NC

- For the 2020-2021 season, league playoffs were held despite numerous programs not competing due to the COVID pandemic.

=== ACC Fall Classic ===
From 2009 to 2020, NC State hosted the Stephen Russell Tournament at some point every season to commemorate the loss of their goaltender, Stephen Russell, who had died. The team retired Russell's #20 in his honor.

Starting in the 2021–2022 season, the ACC began to host what is now the annual fall tournament for all M2 member teams for a three-game league weekend. The tournament takes place at The St. James in Springfield, Virginia. The league will typically invite two non-members from ACHA Men's Division II to come participate as well. In 2022, the ACC began awarding a Men's Premier and Elite winner separately as well as a Women's winner which is held on a different weekend. The Women's division did not hold an event in 2026.

The current tournament features a conglomerate scoring system of winning periods (2 points per period) and whole games (4 points = W, 2 points = OT/SOW, 1 point = OT/SOL, and 0 points = L). The totals are added for a final score.

Year	Tournament Champion
2013	NC State
2014	North Carolina
2015	NC State
2016	James Madison
2017	James Madison
2018	Virginia
2019	NC State
2020	NC State
2021	NC State
2022	Rowan (Premier) | Denison (Elite) | Virginia Tech (Women's)
2023	Rider (Premier) | George Washington (Elite) | Virginia (Women's)
2024	Penn State (Premier) | Saint Joseph's (Elite) | Virginia (Women's)
2025	Penn State (Premier) | Saint Joseph's (Elite) | High Point (Women's)
2026	Wake Forest (Premier) | Georgetown (Elite)

== ACHA Men's Division II Southeast Regionals ==
The ACHA hosts their regional tournaments towards the end of February. Four regions (Northeast, Southeast, Central and West) see teams ranked #1-16 compete in a single elimination, two-day weekend for four berths to the Men's Division II National Tournament.

- 2020: #9 Wake Forest defeated #12 The College of New Jersey in Overtime; defeated #4 NC State; lost to #3 Cincinnati.
- 2021: ACHA did not hold the regional tournament due to the shortened seasons caused by COVID-19.
- 2022: #3 NC State lost to #13 Pennsylvania / #14 North Carolina lost to #7 Indiana.
- 2023: #7 Penn State defeated #14 Rider; lost to #6 Ohio / #9 Rowan lost to #12 Louisville / #11 North Carolina defeated #10 NC State; defeated #5 Miami Ohio in Overtime; lost to #3 Kentucky.
- 2024: #7 North Carolina lost to #14 Pennsylvania / #8 NC State defeated #13 Rowan; defeated #6 Ohio; lost to #3 Indiana / #9 Penn State defeated #12 UNC Wilmington; lost to #5 Kentucky in Overtime / #10 Rider defeated #11 Louisville; lost to #4 Miami Ohio.
- 2025: #4 Penn State lost to #9 Indiana / #5 Virginia Tech lost to #8 Ohio in double Overtime / #6 NC State lost to #7 Miami Ohio in Overtime / #11 North Carolina lost to #10 Louisville / #14 Rider lost to #7 Miami Ohio.
- 2026: #7 Penn State defeated #10 Rowan; defeated #3 Ohio / #9 South Carolina lost to #8 Liberty in Overtime / #11 Tennessee defeated #6 Indiana; lost to #1 Florida Gulf Coast / #14 Virginia Tech lost to #3 Ohio / #15 Georgia lost to #2 Tampa / #16 UNC Wilmington lost to #1 Florida Gulf Coast.

== ACHA Men's Division I National Tournament ==
The ACHA hosts the Men's Division I National Tournament every March, hosting 24 teams with the Top-8 teams receiving first-round byes in a single elimination bracket.

- 2026: Stony Brook (#18) lost to Arizona (#15) 4-0.

== ACHA Men's Division II National Tournament ==
The ACHA hosts the Men's Division II National Tournament every March, hosting 16 teams. Those teams are put into four separate pools with a team from each region. Winner of each pool advances to the Final Four.

- 2019: NC State (SE #4) finished 1–2 in Pool A; lost to Massachusetts (NE #1) 7–2, defeated Northern Colorado (West #2) 6-5 and lost to Trine (Central #3) 9–1.
- 2021: NC State (#2) finished 2–1 in Pool A; defeated Providence (#4) 6–4, Davenport (#3) 5-3 and lost to Mary (#1) 5–1.
- 2026: Penn State (SE #4) finished 2-1 in Pool B; defeated Niagara (NE #1) 5-1, lost to Schoolcraft College (Central #2) 4-2 and defeated Montana State (West #3) 6-2; lost to Florida Gulf Coast (SE #1) in National Semi-Final 6-2.

== AAU Men's Division II National Tournament ==
The AAU hosts the Men's Division II National Tournament every March, hosting 12 teams (32 teams prior to 2025) in a double-elimination format. The overall winner is the AAU Division II College Hockey National Champion.

- 2022: Christopher Newport (#16) finished 2-1 to win Pool A; lost to Central Florida (#17) 3-1, defeated Salisbury (#32) 5-2 and Tampa (#1) 4-3 in Overtime; lost to Ramapo (#9) in the Quarter's 9-2 / Liberty (#12) finished 0–3 in Pool E; lost to Buffalo State (#21) 7-3, College of Charleston 4-2 and Babson (#5) 9-3 / East Carolina (#18) finished 1–2 in Pool B; lost to St. Bonaventure (#15) 9-4, Farmingdale State (#2) 7-2 and defeated Penn State Harrisburg (#31) 6-1 / College of Charleston (#28) went 1–2 in Pool E; lost to Babson (#5) 9-4, defeated Liberty 4-2 and lost to Buffalo State (#21) 11-5.
- 2023: Liberty (#4) finished 0-2-1 in Pool G; tied Fordham (#26) 3-3 in Overtime, lost to Alabama (#18) 5-1 and South Carolina (#10) 7-6 in Overtime / High Point (#32) finished 1-2 in Pool A; lost to St. Bonaventure (#1) 5-0 and Georgia (#16) 7-0 and defeated Massachusetts Maritime Academy (#24) 7-2.
- 2024: High Point (#3) finished 3-0 in Pool C; defeated Farmingdale State (#18) 3-0, Alabama Huntsville (#13) 6-4 and Central Florida (#8) 5-3; defeated Clemson (#11) in the Quarters 6-4; lost to Florida (#2) in the Semi's 9-3 / Liberty (#6) finished 0-3 in Pool E; lost to Clemson (#11) 5-2, Vanderbilt (#16) 5-4 and Bishop's (#5) 6-3.
- 2025: High Point (#3) finished 3-0 in Pool C; defeated Georgia Tech (#18) 7-1, Miami FL (#13) 6-1 and Penn State Harrisburg (#8) 5-2; defeated South Florida (#5) in the Quarter's 5-3; defeated Tampa (#6) in the Semi's 5-2; lost to Florida Atlantic (#1) in National Championship 5-2 / Wake Forest (#11) finished 0-3 in Pool A; lost to Farmingham State (#10) 6-3, Florida Atlantic (#1) 5-0 and Lynn (#20) 5-4 / Richmond (#16) was to play in Pool E but dropped out prior.
- 2026: Elon (#12) lost to Bishop's University (#1) 9-2 and defeated Delaware (#7) 5-3, Maine (#5) 4-3; defeated Cortland (#6) in the Quarter's 4-3; lost to Anna Maria College (#2) in the Semi's 9-3.

== AAU Men's Division III National Tournament ==
The AAU hosts the Men's Division III National Tournament every March, hosting 16 teams (8 teams prior to 2025) in a double-elimination format. The overall winner is the AAU Division III College Hockey National Champion.

- 2024: William & Mary (#8) finished 0-3 in Pool A; lost to Miami FL (#1) 4-0, Stony Brook (#4) 5-2 and Rochester (#6) 11-2.
- 2025: Liberty (#1) finished 2-1 in Pool A; defeated Alvernia (#12) 4-0, defeated Rowan (#7) 4-0 and lost to St. John Fisher (#6) 3-2 / Rowan (#7) finished 1-2 in Pool A; lost to St. John Fisher (#6) 5-1, lost to Liberty (#1) 4-0 and defeated Alvernia (#12) 6-1 / Coastal Carolina (#4) finished 1-2 in Pool C; defeated Stony Brook (#9) 5-2, lost to Fairfield (#10) 4-3 and lost to South Carolina (#3) 4-3 / Appalachian State (#8) finished 1-2 in Pool B; lost to Rutgers (#5) 7-2, lost to Columbia (#2) 8-6 and defeated Tennessee (#11) 4-3 in Overtime.
- 2026: Liberty (#1) defeated Buffalo State (#16) 9-2, High Point (#9) 5-1, Fairfield (#5) 5-1; defeated Columbia (#10) in the Semi's 10-0; defeated St. John Fisher (#3) in National Championship 3-0 / Alabama (#2) defeated Canisius (#15) 6-3, Quincy College (#6) 3-2, lost to St. John Fisher (#3) in double Overtime 3-2; lost to Columbia (#10) in the Quarter's in Overtime 5-4 / Georgia (#7) defeated Springfield College (#11) 6-4, lost to St. John Fisher (#3) 2-0, defeated Stevenson (#13) 5-3, lost to Columbia (#10) 4-0 / High Point (#9) defeated Columbia (#10) 13-7, lost to Liberty (#1) 5-1 and lost to Springfield College (#11) 7-4 / Stevenson (#13) lost Jefferson Community College (#4) 4-1, defeated North Florida (#17) 9-3, lost to Georgia (#7) 5-3 / North Florida (#17) lost to St. John Fisher (#3) 8-3, lost to Stevenson (#13) 9-3.

== AAU Women's National Tournament ==
The AAU hosts the Women's National Tournament every March, hosting 8 teams in a double-elimination format. The overall winner is the AAU Women's College Hockey National Champion.

- 2026: High Point (#6) lost to Paul Smith's College (#3) 7-2 and defeated South Carolina (#7) 6-5; lost to Syracuse (#1) in the Quarter's 3-1.
