= Colonial States College Hockey Conference =

American college ice hockey league

Colonial States College Hockey Conference (CSCHC)
- Conference: ACHA
- Founded: 2014
- President: Alec Artosky
- Commissioner: Tim Moran
- Sports fielded: Men's ice hockey
- Division: Division II
- No. of teams: 9
- Region: Northeast
- Most recent champion: Millersville (1st title) (2024–25)
- Most titles: TCNJ Lions (4 titles)T (Note: The College of New Jersey (2014–2022), joined Northeast Collegiate Hockey League (ACHA Division I) in 2022.)

The Colonial States College Hockey Conference (CSCHC) is a non-varsity club college ice hockey league based in the mid-Atlantic region of the United States. The conference is part of the American Collegiate Hockey Association Division 2 and is made up of teams from colleges and universities based in New Jersey and Pennsylvania.

== History ==
The original logo of the CSCHC (Used from 2014 to 2017)

The conference was formed on April 14, 2014, by programs previously associated with the Great Northeast Collegiate Hockey Conference (GNCHC). The original seven members consisted of Millersville University, New Jersey Institute of Technology (NJIT), Princeton University, Seton Hall University, The College of New Jersey (TCNJ), the University of Pennsylvania, and West Chester University. The founder and first president of the conference was Tom Hench (2014–2016). Andrew Ducko took over as president from 2016 to 2022. Sal Capone took over as president from 2016 to 2024. Currently Alec Artosky is president (2024–present).

After the inaugural season, the CSCHC put together and all star team to compete in the 2015 ACHA all star challenge. Team CSCHC won their opening game 4–1 over the ACCHL. The 2015 CSCHC All-stars finished with a 2-2-0-1 record.

Prior to the 2015–16 season Monmouth University joined the conference from the Mid-Atlantic Collegiate Hockey Association (MACH), raising the total number of teams to eight. In November 2015, the ACHA granted the CSCHC an automatic bid into the ACHA D2 Regional Tournament.

In March 2016, Rutgers University and the University of Scranton were accepted into the conference from the GNCHC following the 2015–16 season.

At the end of the 2017 ACHA season, the CSCHC participated in the ACHA All-Star Challenge, finishing 6th with a 3–3 record.

For the 2018–19 season the conference adopted a new shootout rule for regular season games that were tied at the conclusion of overtime, eliminating the "tie" entirely from CSCHC play. Following the season the CSCHC took part in the 2019 Men's Division 2 All Star Challenge, along with 12 other DII leagues and one group representing independent programs, which was hosted at West Chester's Ice Line Quad Rinks. The team finished 12th with a record of 1–3–1. In August 2019, TCNJ was announced as a 2020 ACHA Men's Division 2 Regional host, with Loucks Ice Center in Lawrenceville, New Jersey acting as the site for the Southeast tournament between February 28 and March 1. This was the first time that a team from The Colonial acted as an official host for an official ACHA event. The two teams that advanced to the 2020 National Tournament from this were #3 University of Cincinnati and #7 Miami University. The 2020 ACHA National tournament was later canceled due to the COVID-19 pandemic.

In April 2020, Stockton University was announced at the conference's 11th member ahead of the 2020–21 season (which was eventually canceled due to the COVID-19 pandemic). The Ospreys became the first member to jump into Division 2 with its move, most recently playing in the Delaware Valley Collegiate Hockey Conference's (DVCHC) National Division at the Division 3 level. The team also rejoined the ACHA as the DVCHC, at the time of the 2019–20 season, was playing under the Collegiate Hockey Federation, a separate non-varsity governing body. The next year the league accepted Bryn Athyn College as its 12th member, which had transitioned from playing as an Independent NCAA DIII program to ACHA DII.

The Colonial entered the 2022–23 season with the admission Penn State Berks, its first team to join from ACHA Division 1 (Eastern Collegiate Hockey Association). However the conference also lost members for the first time with the departures of The College of New Jersey, Princeton University, and Monmouth University. With ten teams participating the conference reverted to a single division format.

Rutgers University left the conference after the 2022–23 season. NJIT and Penn State Berks also withdrew from the conference in 2023. Drexel University joined the conference for the 2023–24 season after the Mid-Atlantic Collegiate Hockey Association (MACH) folded.

Beginning in the 2024–2025 season the conference was moved to the Northeast Region of the ACHA M2 after spending ten years in the Southeast ACHA M2 region (2014–2024) since the conference inception.

At the 2025 ACHA All-Star Challenge, the CSCHC All-Stars recorded a 3–2 record and finished in third place.

Ahead of the 2025–2026 season the CSCHC welcomed two new teams; Neumann University from the Delaware Valley Collegiate Hockey Conference and The College of New Jersey from the Atlantic Coast Collegiate Hockey League (TCNJ launched a Men's Division 2 team following its jump to ACHA Division 1 in 2022). In March 2025, Bryn Athyn announced it was eliminating all of its NCAA sports teams and its club hockey team due to the school's financial instability.

In the Summer of 2026, both The College of New Jersey & Seton Hall University left the conference and joined Metropolitan Collegiate Hockey Conference (ACHA Division III). The conference the welcomed Lehigh University to begin play for the 2026–2027 season. Lehigh also has an ACHA Division I hockey team competing in the Eastern Collegiate Hockey Association. Also for the 2026-2027 season, Drexel remains on the schedule as an associate member, but games against the Dragons won’t count toward the league standings this year.

=== Notable achievements ===
Date	Description	Player or Team	Notes
September 26, 2014	First league game	Millersville University & Princeton University	at Lancaster Ice Rink
September 26, 2014	First league team Win	Millersville University	Millersville won, 8–1, over Princeton
September 26, 2014	First league goal	Alex Vukasin (Princeton Tigers)	2 minutes and 57 seconds into the 1st period
September 26, 2014	First league assist	James McNally (Millersville University)	Assisted on Millersville's first goal 4 minutes and 53 seconds into the first period
September 26, 2014	First league goalie win	Eric Hench (Millersville University)	60 minutes played with 12 saves on 13 shots
September 26, 2014	First league Power Play Goal	Nicholas Mullarkey (Millersville University)	scored on Millersville's seventh goal of the game, 19 minutes and 48 seconds into the second period
September 26, 2014	First league Shorthanded Goal	Brian Monteith (Millersville University)	Millersville's first goal of the game, 4 minutes and 53 seconds into the first period
September 26, 2014	First league penalty	Nicholas Mullarkey; Millersville University	Called for hooking minor 4 minutes and 42 seconds into the first period
September 26, 2014	First league Game Winning Goal	Cyle Knopf (Millersville University)	Millersville's second goal of the game 17 minutes and 26 seconds into the first period.
November 14, 2014	First league shutout	Marc Daouphars (Millersville University)	27 saves in 7–0 win over NJIT
December 5, 2014	First league team to win over a ranked opponent	West Chester Golden Rams	WEST CHESTER-5 over #8 Delaware-4, in overtime
February 17, 2015	First Team in Rankings	Millersville University	received ranking votes in final ranking period in ACHA South East Region
February 21, 2015	First league MVP	James McNally (Millersville University)	50 points (19 goals, 31 assists) in 2014–15 season
February 22, 2015	First league champion	West Chester Golden Rams	Defeated Seton Hall University in the final, 3–2
February 26, 2016	First conference team to compete in the ACHA Southeast Regional Tournament via autobid	Princeton Tigers	The 2016 conference winners fell, 5–3, to the University of Louisville in Dale City, VA.
March 1, 2019	First conference team to win a game at ACHA Southeast Regional Tournament	TCNJ Lions	Defeated Rowan University, 4–3, in Lynchburg, VA.
February 20, 2022	First league team to make regionals via at-large bid	University of Pennsylvania	Ranked #13 in final ranking period, earning spot in regionals without a conference autobid
November 10, 2024	First Team Ranked in Northeast Regional rankings	West Chester Golden Rams	Ranked #25 in first ranking period
February 9, 2025	First conference team to compete in the ACHA Northeast Regional Tournament via autobid	Millersville University	Won 2025 Colonial Cup

== Playoff format ==
=== Original (2014 to 2021), current (2022 to present) ===
Teams within the conference play one-another twice a season, once at home and once on the road. The results of these games count towards league standings and determine the playoff seeds. The top six teams at the conclusion of the regular season will qualify for the conference playoffs, which are held at a single venue over the course of one weekend.

The top two seeds receive a bye in the first round. The third seed faces the sixth seed, while the fourth seed faces the fifth. The second round sees the top seed take on the lowest remaining seed, and the second seed take on the second highest seed remaining. The two teams that advance will face each-other in the championship game, with the winner receiving both the conference trophy and a birth in the ACHA Regional Tournament.

=== Dual division iteration (2021 to 2022) ===
For the 2021–22 season, the Colonial split its twelve member teams into two divisions. These divisions, named the Liberty and Independence divisions, have individual standings and their own qualification methods into the 2022 Colonial Cup playoffs. Teams in the Liberty Division, the larger of the two groups, play one-another twice, home and away, and play Independence teams once amounting to a 18-game regular season. The four teams within the Independence Division play one-another three times with one additional game against each of the teams in the Liberty Division. This amounts to a 17-game regular season.

Following the conclusion of the regular season a seven-team playoff is hosted. The top six teams in the Liberty Division qualify for the tournament with the school finishing first overall receiving a bye into the semifinals. The seventh seed in the tournament goes to the highest finishing team in the Independence Division. The second seed faces the seventh seed (Independence), while the third faces the sixth and fourth faces the fifth. In the semifinals the first seed plays the lowest seed remaining in the tournament while the other two remaining teams face off. The two teams that advance will face each-other in the championship game.

== Member teams ==
Colonial members in New Jersey
Colonial members in Pennsylvania

School	Location	Nickname	Primary conference	Team colors	Joined	Website
Lehigh University (Note: Lehigh has a ACHA Division I hockey team competing in the Eastern Collegiate Hockey Association.)	Bethlehem, PA	Mountain Hawks	Patriot League (D-I)		2026	
Millersville University of Pennsylvania (Note: Millersville has a ACHA Division III hockey team competing in the Atlantic Coast Collegiate Hockey League.)	Millersville, PA	Marauders	PSAC (DII)		2014	
Neumann University (Note: Neumann has an NCAA Division III hockey team competing in the Middle Atlantic Conferences.)	Aston Township, PA	Knights	MAC (DIII)		2025	
University of Pennsylvania (Note: The University of Pennsylvania previously had an NCAA Division I hockey team competing in the National Collegiate Athletic Association.)	Philadelphia, PA	Quakers	Ivy (DI)		2014	
University of Scranton (Note: Scranton previously had an NCAA Division III hockey team competing in the National Collegiate Athletic Association.)	Scranton, PA	Royals	Landmark (DIII)		2016	None
Stockton University	Galloway, NJ	Ospreys	NJAC (DIII)		2020	
West Chester University (Note: West Chester has a ACHA Division I hockey team competing in the Eastern Collegiate Hockey Association and a ACHA Division III hockey team competing in the Atlantic Coast Collegiate Hockey League.)	West Chester, PA	Golden Rams	PSAC (DII)		2014	

== Associate Members ==
School	Location	Nickname	Primary conference	Team colors	Joined	Website
Drexel University (Note: Drexel has a ACHA Division I hockey team competing in the Eastern States Collegiate Hockey League.) (Note: for 2026-2027, Drexel remains on the schedule as an associate member, but games against the Dragons won’t count toward the league standings this year..)	Philadelphia, PA	Dragons	CAA (DI)		2023-2026	

=== Conference arenas ===
School	Home arena	Location
Lehigh	Steel Ice Center	Bethlehem, Pennsylvania
Millersville	Lancaster Ice Rink	Lancaster, Pennsylvania
Neumann	IceWorks Skating Complex	Aston, Pennsylvania
Penn	Class of 1923 Arena	Philadelphia, Pennsylvania
Scranton	Revolution Ice Centre	Pittston, Pennsylvania
Stockton	Flyers Skate Zone - Atlantic City	Atlantic City, New Jersey
West Chester	Ice Line Quad Rinks	West Chester, Pennsylvania

=== Former members ===
- Princeton University (2014–2022), joined Atlantic Coast Collegiate Hockey League (ACHA Division II) ELITE division in 2022. Princeton has an NCAA Division I Ice Hockey team competing in the ECAC Hockey Conference
- Monmouth University (2015–2022)
- Rutgers University (2016–2023), joined Empire Collegiate Hockey Conference (Amateur Athletic Union) D2 Black Division in 2023. Rutgers has a ACHA Division I hockey team competing in the Northeast Collegiate Hockey League
- New Jersey Institute of Technology (2014–2023), joined Metropolitan Collegiate Hockey Conference (ACHA Division III) in 2023
- Penn State Berks (2022–2023)
- Bryn Athyn Lions (2021–2025), college eliminated all athletics following the 2024–2025 season
- The College of New Jersey (2014–2022, 2025–2026), joined Metropolitan Collegiate Hockey Conference (ACHA Division III) in 2026
- Seton Hall University (2014–2026), joined Metropolitan Collegiate Hockey Conference (ACHA Division III) in 2026

== Season standings ==
=== 2014–15 season ===
Pos.	Team	GP	W	L	T	OTL	Pts
1	Millersville Marauders	12	11	0	1	0	23
2	West Chester Golden Rams	12	9	2	1	0	19
3	TCNJ Lions	12	6	4	2	0	14
4	Seton Hall Pirates	12	5	5	1	1	12
5	Princeton Tigers	12	3	8	1	0	7
6	NJIT Highlanders	12	3	9	0	0	6
7	Penn Quakers	12	2	9	0	1	5

=== 2015–16 season ===
Pos.	Team	GP	W	L	T	OTL	Pts
1	TCNJ Lions	14	11	2	1	0	23
2	Princeton Tigers	14	10	3	1	0	21
3	Millersville Marauders	14	9	4	1	0	19
4	Monmouth Hawks	14	7	5	2	0	16
5	Penn Quakers	14	7	7	0	0	14
6	West Chester Golden Rams	14	6	7	1	0	13
7	NJIT Highlanders	14	2	11	0	1	5
8	Seton Hall Pirates	14	1	12	0	1	3

=== 2016–17 season ===
Pos.	Team	GP	W	L	T	OTL	Pts
1	Princeton Tigers	18	13	3	2	0	28
2	TCNJ Lions	18	13	4	1	0	27
3	Penn Quakers	18	13	5	0	0	26
4	Rutgers Scarlet Knights	18	11	5	2	0	24
5	Millersville Marauders	18	9	6	1	2	21
6	Monmouth Hawks	18	8	7	1	2	19
7	Scranton Royals	18	7	10	1	0	15
8	NJIT Highlanders	18	5	10	1	2	13
9	West Chester Golden Rams	18	4	9	3	2	13
10	Seton Hall Pirates	18	1	16	0	1	3

=== 2017–18 season ===
Pos.	Team	GP	W	L	T	OTL	Pts
1	Penn Quakers	18	13	3	1	1	28
2	Scranton Royals	18	12	4	1	1	26
3	Millersville Marauders	18	10	5	2	1	23
4	TCNJ Lions	18	10	6	2	0	22
5	West Chester Golden Rams	18	9	7	2	0	20
6	Rutgers Scarlet Knights	18	9	8	1	0	19
7	NJIT Highlanders	18	9	9	0	0	18
8	Seton Hall Pirates	18	7	11	0	0	14
9	Princeton Tigers	18	4	12	0	2	10
10	Monmouth Hawks	18	2	11	1	4	9

=== 2018–19 season ===
Pos.	Team	GP	W	L	OTL	SOL	Pts
1	Scranton Royals	18	14	3	1	0	29
2	Penn Quakers	18	14	3	0	1	29
3	TCNJ Lions	18	14	4	0	0	28
4	Millersville Marauders	18	11	5	0	2	24
5	Rutgers Scarlet Knights	18	10	7	0	1	21
6	Princeton Tigers	18	10	7	1	0	21
7	NJIT Highlanders	18	8	10	0	0	16
8	West Chester Golden Rams	18	7	10	0	1	15
9	Seton Hall Pirates	18	1	13	2	2	6
10	Monmouth Hawks	18	1	15	1	1	4

=== 2019–20 season ===
Pos.	Team	GP	W	L	OTL	SOL	Pts
1	TCNJ Lions	18	16	1	0	1	33
2	Penn Quakers	18	15	2	0	1	31
3	Scranton Royals	18	13	4	1	0	27
4	Rutgers Scarlet Knights	18	11	4	0	3	25
5	West Chester Golden Rams	18	10	7	1	0	21
6	Millersville Marauders	18	9	7	1	1	20
7	Seton Hall Pirates	18	6	12	0	0	12
8	Monmouth Hawks	18	4	13	1	0	9
9	NJIT Highlanders	18	4	14	0	0	8
10	Princeton Tigers	18	2	16	0	0	4

=== 2020–21 season ===
Not played due to the COVID-19 Pandemic

=== 2021–22 season ===
Liberty Division

Pos.	Team	GP	W	L	OTL/SOL	Pts
1	Penn Quakers	16	14	2	0	28
2	Millersville Marauders	16	12	3	1	25
3	TCNJ Lions	16	12	3	1	25
4	Stockton Ospreys	16	9	6	1	19
5	Bryn Athyn Lions	16	9	6	1	19
6	Scranton Royals	16	7	9	0	14
7	West Chester Golden Rams	16	1	14	1	3
8	Rutgers Scarlet Knights	N/A (Note: Rutgers was unable to complete its conference schedule due to conflicting COVID rules with other members. It became ineligible for the 2021–22 Colonial Cup Playoffs and all its games were retroactively deemed non-league (not counted towards standings).)				

Independence Division

Pos.	Team	GP	W	L	OTL/SOL	Pts
1	Seton Hall Pirates	16	12	3	1	25
2	NJIT Highlanders	15	5	9	1	11
3	Princeton Tigers	14	3	11	0	6
4	Monmouth Hawks	15	1	14	0	2

=== 2022–23 season ===
Pos.	Team	GP	W	L	OTL/SOL	Pts
1	Penn Quakers	14	13	1	0	26
2	Seton Hall Pirates	14	12	2	0	24
3	Millersville Marauders	14	11	2	1	23
4	Stockton Ospreys	14	7	6	1	15
5	Scranton Royals	14	6	6	2	14
6	West Chester Golden Rams	14	3	10	1	7
7	Rutgers Scarlet Knights	14	2	11	1	5
8	Bryn Athyn Lions	14	2	12	0	4
N/A	NJIT Highlanders	N/A (Note: NJIT dropped to an associate member not long into the season. They became ineligible for the 2022–23 Colonial Cup Playoffs, award nominations, and All-Star nominees. All NJIT games, both already played and future games, were designated as non-league and did not count towards standings.)				
N/A	Penn State Berks Blue Lions	N/A (Note: PSU Berks dropped to an associate member near the end of the 2022–23 season. The team became ineligible for playoffs, with all games previously played against the Blue Lions subsequently re-designated non-league and not counting towards standings or player stats.)				

=== 2023–24 season ===
Pos.	Team	GP	W	L	OTL/SOL	Pts
1	Millersville Marauders	14	11	3	0	22
2	Penn Quakers	14	10	4	0	20
3	Stockton Ospreys	14	9	5	0	18
4	Drexel Dragons	14	6	5	3	15
5	Scranton Royals	14	6	7	1	13
6	Seton Hall Pirates	14	6	8	0	12
7	Bryn Athyn Lions	14	5	8	1	11
8	West Chester Golden Rams	14	3	10	1	7

=== 2024–25 season ===
Pos.	Team	GP	W	L	OTL/SOL	Pts
1	Millersville Marauders	14	12	2	0	24
2	West Chester Golden Rams	14	10	3	1	21
3	Scranton Royals	14	9	3	2	20
4	Stockton Ospreys	14	7	7	0	14
5	Penn Quakers	14	6	8	0	12
6	Seton Hall Pirates	14	6	8	0	12
7	Drexel Dragons	14	3	8	3	9
8	Bryn Athyn Lions	14	3	11	0	6

=== 2025–26 season ===
Pos.	Team	GP	W	L	OTL/SOL	Pts
1	West Chester Golden Rams	16	14	1	1	29
2	Neumann Knights	16	12	4	0	24
3	Scranton Royals	16	12	4	0	24
4	Millersville Marauders	16	10	4	2	22
5	Stockton Ospreys	16	9	7	0	18
6	Penn Quakers	16	7	7	2	16
7	Drexel Dragons	16	6	10	0	12
8	Seton Hall Pirates	16	2	14	0	4
9	TCNJ Lions	16	0	16	0	0

== Championship results ==
Season	Date	Winner	Score	Runners–up	Venue	Regular season winner
2014–15	February 22, 2015	West Chester Golden Rams (1)	3–2	Seton Hall Pirates (1)	Loucks Ice Center	Millersville Marauders (1)
2015–16	February 21, 2016	Princeton Tigers (1)	5–4 (OT)	TCNJ Lions (1)	Ice Line Quad Rinks	TCNJ Lions (1)
2016–17	February 19, 2017	TCNJ Lions (1)	5–0	Princeton Tigers (1)	Loucks Ice Center	Princeton Tigers (1)
2017–18	February 18, 2018	TCNJ Lions (2)	14–5	Scranton Royals (1)	Loucks Ice Center	Penn Quakers (1)
2018–19	February 17, 2019	TCNJ Lions (3)	3–2	Scranton Royals (2)	Loucks Ice Center	Scranton Royals (1)
2019–20	February 16, 2020	TCNJ Lions (4)	3–2	Penn Quakers (1)	Loucks Ice Center	TCNJ Lions (2)
2020–21	Not played due to the COVID-19 Pandemic					
2021–22	February 20, 2022	Penn Quakers (1)	6–2	TCNJ Lions (2)	CURE Insurance Arena	Penn Quakers (2)
2022–23	February 19, 2023	Penn Quakers (2)	10–3	Millersville Marauders (1)	Class of 1923 Arena	Penn Quakers (3)
2023–24	February 11, 2024	Penn Quakers (3)	12–5	Millersville Marauders (2)	Class of 1923 Arena	Millersville Marauders (2)
2024–25	February 9, 2025	Millersville Marauders (1)	9–5	West Chester Golden Rams (1)	Class of 1923 Arena	Millersville Marauders (3)
2025–26	February 8, 2026	West Chester Golden Rams (2)	4–3 (OT)	Millersville Marauders (3)	Lancaster Ice Rink	West Chester Golden Rams (1)
2026-27	2027	TBD	TBD	TBD	Ice Line Quad Rinks	TBD

== Regional bids ==
Season	Round	CSCHC Team	Score	Opponent	Opponent Conference	Reference
Southeast Regionals
2015–16	Play-in Round	#12 Princeton Tigers	3–5	#9 Louisville Cardinals	TSCHL	
2016–17	Play-in Round	#12 TCNJ Lions	2–6	#9 Rowan Profs	MACH	
2017–18	Play-in Round	#12 TCNJ Lions	1–6	#9 Maryland Terrapins	MACH	
2018–19	Play-in Round	#12 TCNJ Lions	4–3	#9 Rowan Profs	MACH	
2018–19	Round One	#12 TCNJ Lions	1–6	#3 Liberty Flames	MACH	
2019–20	Play-in Round	#12 TCNJ Lions	2–3 (OT)	#9 Wake Forest Demon Deacons	ACCHL	
2021–22	Round One	#13 Penn Quakers	6–4	#8 Kentucky Wildcats	TSCHL	
2021–22	Round Two	#13 Penn Quakers	4–3	#3 NC State Wolfpack	ACCHL	
2021–22	Round Three	#13 Penn Quakers	0–5	#7 Indiana Hoosiers	TSCHL	
2022–23	Round One	#13 Penn Quakers	4–3	#8 Michigan Wolverines	TSCHL	
2022–23	Round Two	#13 Penn Quakers	3–13	#3 Kentucky Wildcats	TSCHL	
2023–24	Round One	#14 Penn Quakers	8–6	#7 North Carolina Tar Heels	ACCHL	
2023–24	Round Two	#14 Penn Quakers	5–14	#3 Indiana Hoosiers*	TSCHL	
Northeast Regionals
2024–25	Round One	#14 Millersville Marauders	3–5	#7 UMass Minutemen	NECHA	
2025–26	Round One	#16 West Chester Golden Rams	1-10	#1 Niagara University	UNYHL	

* – eventual ACHA Men's Division 2 National Champion

== See also ==
- American Collegiate Hockey Association
- List of ice hockey leagues
