= Bob Crocker =

American ice hockey scout, coach, and executive

Biographical details
- Born: August 3, 1928; Boston, Massachusetts, U.S.
- Died: December 22, 2018 (aged 90)

Playing career

Ice Hockey
- 1954–55: Boston University

Coaching career (HC unless noted)

Ice Hockey
- 1960–1972: Boston University (freshmen)
- 1972–1976: Penn
- 1976–1977: Colby (assistant)

Baseball
- 1955: Boston University (freshman)
- 1963–1971: Boston University

Administrative career (AD unless noted)
- 1956–1964: Boston University (dir. of intramural sports)
- 1977–1980: New England/Hartford Whalers (scout)
- 1980–1992: Hartford Whalers (asst. gm)
- 1992–2005: New York Rangers (scout)
- 2005–2017: Los Angeles Kings (scout)

Head coaching record
- Overall: 42–54–4 (.440) (Ice hockey); 70–82–4 (.462) (Baseball)

Accomplishments and honors

Championships
- 3x Stanley Cup champion (1994, 2012, 2014)

Awards
- Lester Patrick Award (2015)

Robert Walter Crocker (August 3, 1928 – December 22, 2018) was an American ice hockey scout, coach, and executive. He was awarded the Lester Patrick Award, for contributions to hockey in the United States, in 2015.

== Biography ==
Born in East Boston, Crocker graduated from the High School of Commerce in Boston. He spent four years in the United States Navy before enrolling at Boston University in 1951. He played for the Boston University Terriers men's ice hockey team during the 1954–55 season. In 1955, he served as B.U.'s freshman baseball coach. The following year, he became the school's director of intramural sports. In 1960, he took on the additional role of freshman hockey coach. Following the 1962 season, he became the Terriers' baseball varsity coach. He remained at BU until 1972, when he was passed over as varsity hockey coach in favor of Leon Abbott.

From 1972 to 1976, he coached the University of Pennsylvania men's hockey team. He served as a part-time assistant to former Boston University coach Jack Kelley at Colby College during the 1976–77 season. In 1977, Crocker became a scout for the New England Whalers. He was promoted to assistant general manager in 1980 and held that position until 1992, when he went to scout for the New York Rangers. Crocker scouted for the Rangers until 2005, when he joined the Los Angeles Kings organization. He won three Stanley Cups during his time with the Rangers and Kings, and a Calder Cup with the Hartford Wolf Pack of the AHL. In 2006, he was inducted into the Massachusetts Hockey Hall of Fame.

== College Head coaching record ==
Record table
Season	Team	Overall	Conference	Standing	Postseason
Pennsylvania Quakers (ECAC Hockey) (1972–1976)
1972–73	Pennsylvania	16–9–2	13–7–2	4th	ECAC Third Place Game (Loss)
1973–74	Pennsylvania	10–14–0	9–12–0	10th	
1974–75	Pennsylvania	10–13–1	9–13–1	11th	
1975–76	Pennsylvania	6–19–1	5–17–1	16th	
Pennsylvania:		42–54–4	36–49–4		
Total:		42–54–4			
National champion Postseason invitational champion Conference regular season champion Conference regular season and conference tournament champion Division regular season champion Division regular season and conference tournament champion Conference tournament champion
