= Ice Line Quad Rinks =

Ice arena in Pennsylvania, U.S.

Coordinates: 39.98299°N 75.58434°W

- Ice Line
- Interactive map of Ice Line Quad Rinks
- Address: 700 Lawrence Drive, West Chester, Pennsylvania, United States
- Owner: John Graves
- Capacity: 500
- Surface: Ice 200 ft × 85 ft (61 m × 26 m)

Tenants
- West Chester University (Varsity) (ECHA); West Chester University (JV) (CSCHC); West Chester University (Women) (CHE); Penn State Brandywine (DVCHC); Villanova University (ECHA); Philadelphia Junior Flyers (EHL)

Ice Line Quad Rinks is an ice arena in West Chester, Pennsylvania, United States. The building contains four NHL-regulation ice surfaces, each with a seating capacity of 500, concession area, and other amenities.

The rink is the home of a number of programs, including:

- West Chester University men's ice hockey teams competing at the ACHA Division I level in the ESCHL and JV team at the ACHA DII level in the Colonial States College Hockey Conference (CSCHC). Hosted the latter's league playoffs in February 2016.
- West Chester University women's ice hockey team competing at the ACHA Women's DII level in College Hockey East (CHE).
- Philadelphia Junior Flyers Tier III Jr. A junior ice hockey team playing in the Eastern Hockey League (EHL).

In addition Ice Line hosts a number of Junior, youth, high school, and adult ice hockey games and tournaments, ice skating, and figure skating.
