= Eastern Collegiate Hockey Association =

- Conference: ACHA
- Founded: 1991
- Commissioner: Gregg Marinari
- Sports fielded: Ice hockey; men's: yes; women's: no
- Division: Division I
- No. of teams: 11
- Headquarters: Parkton, Maryland, U.S.
- Region: Mid Atlantic/East Coast
- Official website: ECHA.com

Established in 1991, the Eastern Collegiate Hockey Association is a hockey-only college athletic conference whose members are East Coast schools. The ECHA is part of the American Collegiate Hockey Association Division 1.

== League Format ==
ECHA members play each conference opponent twice, once at home and once away, with some flexibility for opponents with longer travel times. 3 points are awarded for a regulation win, 2 points are awarded for an overtime or shootout win, and 1 points is awarded for an overtime or shootout loss. Teams also play non-league games against other ACHA member schools. At the conclusion of the regular season in February the league holds a championship tournament, which is a single elimination with teams seeded based on the regular season standings. At the conclusion of the ECHA championship tournament, the ECHA regular season champions receive an automatic bid to the ACHA Men's Division I National Tournament. The ECHA tournament champion is awarded the A.J. Ruth Memorial Cup.

== League History ==
The ECHA is currently composed of eleven member institutions: George Mason, Villanova, Temple, William Paterson, The United States Naval Academy, Towson, Lehigh, West Chester, New York, Drexel, and Rhode Island. The 2012/2013, 2013/2014, and 2015/2016 regular season titles were won by Navy; they also won the postseason tournament in 2013.

Previous members include Lebanon Valley College who ended ECHA competition with the 2012 season. In the 2014/2015 season the University of Scranton folded their hockey program bringing the current number of members to 6. Also in 2014/2015 Drexel won its fifth ECHA tournament championship 10–3 against Towson, while Villanova won the regular season title. Drexel goalie Zach Kanter was named ECHA tournament MVP in 2015. In effort to maintain the conferences automatic bid to the National Championship Tournament, the ECHA welcomed Temple University beginning in 2015/2016. That same year the Naval Academy took home the regular season championship.

For the 2024-25 season, the ECHA announced that it would be adding NYU and would expand conference play to 16 games. 2024-25 also introduced a new playoff structure, with each team now making the playoffs in a 9-team single elimination tournament spanning across 2 weekends.

For the 2025-26 season, it was announced that following the dissolution of the ESCHL, the ECHA would be adding Rhode Island to the conference and would also welcome back Drexel, who previously played in the conference before leaving for the ESCHL prior to the 2021-22 season. Despite these new teams being added, the conference play schedule would remain the same, with each team playing each other twice for a minimum of 20 conference games.

=== ECHA Championship History ===
Year	Regular season champion	Tournament champion
1994-1995	Delaware	Towson (State)
1995-1996		Towson (State)
1999-2000		Towson
2000-2001	Drexel	
2001-2002	Rhode Island	
2002-2003	Towson	
2004-2005	Drexel	
2011-12	Drexel	Drexel
2012-13	Navy	Towson
2013-14	Navy	Navy
2014-15	Villanova	Drexel
2015-16	Navy	Navy
2016-17	Drexel	Drexel
2017-18	Drexel	Drexel
2018-19	Drexel	West Chester
2019-20	Drexel	Drexel
2020-21	DID NOT PLAY	DID NOT PLAY
2021-22	Navy	Navy
2022-23	Navy	West Chester
2023-24	West Chester	Lehigh
2024-25	West Chester	West Chester
2025-26	Rhode Island	Drexel

== Member Institutions ==
School	Location	Founded	Affiliation	Enrollment	Nickname	Primary conference
Drexel University	Philadelphia, PA	1891	Private/Non-sectarian	22,100	Dragons	Coastal Athletic Association (D-I)
George Mason University	Fairfax, VA	1949	Public	26,515	Patriots	Atlantic Ten Conference (D-I)
Lehigh University	Bethlehem, PA	1865	Private/Non-sectarian	6,956	Mountain Hawks	Patriot League (D-I)
New York University	New York City, NY	1832	Private	59,144	Violets	University Athletic Association (D-III)
Temple University	Philadelphia, PA	1884	Public	37,788	Owls	American Athletic Conference (D-I)
Towson University	Towson, MD	1866	Public	19,758	Tigers	Coastal Athletic Association (D-I)
United States Naval Academy	Annapolis, MD	1845	Public/Federal	4,000	Midshipmen	Patriot League (D-I)
University of Rhode Island	Kingston, RI	1892	Public	17,800	Rams	Atlantic 10 Conference (D-I)
Villanova University	Villanova, PA	1842	Private/Catholic	9,535	Wildcats	Big East Conference (D-I)
West Chester University	West Chester, PA	1871	Public	14,712	Golden Rams	Pennsylvania State Athletic Conference (D-II)
William Paterson University	Wayne, NJ	1855	Public	5,298	Pioneers	New Jersey Athletic Conference (D-III)

=== Conference arenas ===
School	Hockey Arena	Location	Capacity
Drexel	Class of 1923 Arena	Philadelphia, PA	2,500
George Mason	Prince William Ice Center	Dale City, VA	N/A
Lehigh	Steel Ice Center	Bethlehem, PA	1,000
United States Naval Academy	McMullen Hockey Arena	Annapolis, MD	1,000 (expandable to 3,000)
William Paterson	Ice Vault Arena	Wayne, NJ	600
Rhode Island	Bradford R. Boss Arena	Kingston, RI	2500
Towson	Ice World	Abingdon, MD	1,000
Villanova	Hatfield Ice World	Hatfield, PA	N/A
Temple	Northeast Skate Zone	Philadelphia, PA	N/A
West Chester	Ice Line	West Chester, PA	500
NYU	Sky Rink at Chelsea Piers	New York City, NY	N/A

=== Former members ===
School	Location	Founded	Affiliation	Enrollment	Nickname	Last year competed in ECHA	Current Conference
Penn State Berks	Spring Township, PA	1958	Public	2,800	Nittany Lions	2020	CSCHC (ACHA D2)
University of Scranton	Scranton, PA	1888	Private	6,034	Royals	2013	CSCHC (ACHA D2)
Lebanon Valley College	Annville, PA	1866	Private	1,600	Flying Dutchmen	2012	ESCHL
Rutgers University	New Brunswick, NJ	1766	Public	65,000	Scarlet Knights	2007	NECHL
West Virginia University	Morgantown, WV	1867	Public	29,466	Mountaineers	2006	CHMA
Duquesne University	Pittsburgh, PA	1878	Public	10,364	Dukes	2006	CHMA

== Past Seasons ==
=== 2025-26 Season ===
==== Conference Tournament ====
Quarterfinals
1	Rhode Island	4
8	Lehigh	1
4	Drexel	9
5	George Mason	1
3	Villanova	5
6	Navy	2
2	West Chester	5
7	NYU	4

Semifinals
1	Rhode Island	1
4	Drexel	5
2	West Chester	5
3	Villanova	2

Finals
2	West Chester	1
4	Drexel	4

==== Regular season standings ====
Team Name	GP	W	OTW	OTL	L	PTS
Rhode Island	20	16	1	0	3	50
West Chester	20	15	1	1	3	48
Villanova	20	13	3	2	2	47
Drexel	20	11	1	4	4	39
George Mason	19*	9	0	2	8	29
Navy	20	7	3	2	8	29
NYU	20	7	2	2	9	27
Lehigh	19*	6	1	1	11	21
William Paterson	19*	4	1	2	12	16
Towson	19*	2	2	0	15	10
Temple	20	2	1	0	17	8

* Lehigh @ Towson and William Paterson @ George Mason were postponed for weather. These were ultimately not played as they would have had no effect on the standings.

=== 2024-25 Season ===
==== Conference Tournament ====
Play-In Game
8	NYU	7
9	Towson	0

Quarterfinals
1	West Chester	3
8	NYU	1
4	George Mason	6
5	Lehigh	1
3	Navy	7
6	Temple	3
2	Villanova	5
7	William Paterson	0

Semifinals
1	West Chester	2
4	George Mason	1
2	Villanova	4
3	Navy	1

Final
1	West Chester	2
2	Villanova	1

==== Regular season standings ====
Team Name	GP	W	OTW	OTL	L	PTS
West Chester*	16	13	0	0	3	39
Villanova	16	12	1	1	2	39
Navy	16	12	0	0	4	36
George Mason	16	10	2	1	3	35
Lehigh	16	6	1	1	8	21
Temple	16	5	0	1	10	16
William Paterson	16	4	0	1	11	13
NYU	16	3	1	0	12	11
Towson	16	1	1	1	13	6

*West Chester received first seed and bid to nationals due to tiebreaker on regulation wins.

== See also ==
- American Collegiate Hockey Association
- List of ice hockey leagues
