= NJIT Highlanders =

New Jersey sports club

- University: New Jersey Institute of Technology
- Nickname: Highlanders
- NCAA: Division I
- Conference: America East (primary); Big South (men's & women's tennis); EIVA (men's volleyball)
- Athletic director: Lenny Kaplan
- Location: Newark, New Jersey
- Varsity teams: 19
- Basketball arena: Wellness and Events Center
- Baseball stadium: Yogi Berra Stadium
- Soccer stadium: Lubetkin Field at Mal Simon Stadium
- Colors: Red and white
- Mascot: The Highlander
- Website: njithighlanders.com

The NJIT Highlanders, formerly the New Jersey Tech Highlanders, are the varsity sport members of the Division I NCAA-affiliated sports teams of New Jersey Institute of Technology (NJIT). There are ten men's teams, seven women's teams, and three club teams along with a variety of intramural teams. The school's primary conference is the America East Conference. In November 2017, NJIT opened the Wellness and Events Center (WEC) which incorporates upgraded facilities for most Division I sports including a 3,500-seat arena for basketball and volleyball.

== History ==
NJIT athletics moved to NCAA Division I, the top level of college athletics, in 2006.

Prior to the reclassification of the athletic program, all teams competed at the Division II level. In the process of reclassification, both men's and women's soccer programs moved up to Division I faster than the other programs by taking advantage of a policy that allows lower division schools to elevate one sport in each gender to Division I in two years. NJIT men's soccer became a full member of NCAA Division I with championship eligibility at the start of the 2005 season. NJIT women's soccer began a similar two-year process in 2005, with full Division I status and championship eligibility arriving with the 2007 season.

NJIT athletics officially gained across-the-board active membership in NCAA Division I, beginning September 1, 2009.

Men's lacrosse, which was elevated from club to full varsity status for the 2015 season (2014–15 school year), competed as an independent through the 2019 season, after which the team joined the Northeast Conference.

== Highlander name and logo ==
NJIT is located in an area of Newark presently known as University Heights, and formerly known as the Newark Highlands. In addition, NJIT's mailing address used to be High Street until the street was renamed in memory of Dr. Martin Luther King Jr. These various references to 'High' are, in large measure, what led the school's students to choose The Highlander as its mascot. Upon moving up to NCAA Division I in 2006–07, NJIT athletics updated its graphics. This included a new logo which depicts a stylized Scottish Highlander warrior in traditional garb.

== Conference history ==
NJIT competed independently until 2009, when the Highlanders became a part of the Great West Conference in the summer of 2008 as one of six programs to form a Division I all-sports league that began full conference scheduling and championships in 2009–10. The Great West Conference was formerly a football-only league. Chicago State University joined the conference in October 2008, increasing the total full-sports members to 7.

The newly expanded conference was not eligible for automatic Division I championship postseason qualification, men's basketball tournament champion was granted an automatic bid to the CollegeInsider.com Postseason Tournament (CIT).

During the 2012–13 basketball season, the NCAA underwent major changes in conference realignment where the WAC added three of five Great West schools, while Houston Baptist accepted an invitation to the Southland Conference. With only NJIT left, the conference folded. Although the Northeast Conference and Atlantic Sun Conference were discussed, it was not offered a spot in either for the 2013–2014 season.

America East Conference logo in NJIT's colors

Some teams began competing as associate members in various conferences. The men's volleyball team joined the Eastern Intercollegiate Volleyball Association (EIVA). In 2013–14, the NJIT men's swimming and diving team began competing in the Coastal Collegiate Swimming Association (CCSA). In 2014, NJIT women's tennis became an associate member of the America East Conference and in 2014–15, soccer began play in the Sun Belt Conference.

After two years as an independent, NJIT announced on June 12, 2015, that it would become a full member of the Atlantic Sun Conference, which at that time it was known as the ASUN Conference, beginning nineteen days later on July 1. The university confirmed on June 12, 2020, its departure from the ASUN after five years to join the America East Conference beginning nineteen days later on July 1. With the America East not sponsoring tennis for either men or women, both tennis teams were independent in the 2020–21 school year before joining the Southland Conference in July 2021.

=== Conference affiliation ===
NCAA Division III

- NCAA Division III Independent – upto 1989–90
- Skyline Conference – 1990–91 to 1996–97

NCAA Division II

- New York Collegiate Athletic Conference (Note: Currently known as the East Coast Conference since 2006.) – 1997–98 to 1999–2000
- Central Atlantic Collegiate Conference – 2000–01 to 2005–06

NCAA Division I

- NCAA Division I Independent – 2006–07 to 2007–08
- Great West Conference – 2008–09 to 2012–13
- NCAA Division I Independent – 2013–14 to 2014–15
- Atlantic Sun Conference – 2015–16 to 2019–20
- America East Conference – 2020–21 to Present

== Sports sponsored ==
A member of the America East Conference, NJIT sponsors teams in ten men's, seven women's, and one coed NCAA sanctioned sports.

Men's sports	Women's sports
Baseball	Basketball
Basketball	Cross country
Cross country	Soccer
Lacrosse	Tennis
Soccer	Track and field^{†}
Swimming and diving	Volleyball
Tennis	
Track and field^{†}	
Volleyball	
Co-ed sports
Fencing
† – Track and field includes both indoor and outdoor

== Club sports ==
- Ice Hockey (affiliated conference : Colonial States College Hockey Conference (ACHA Division II club hockey))
- Bowling (reinstated in 2008–2009)

== Facilities ==
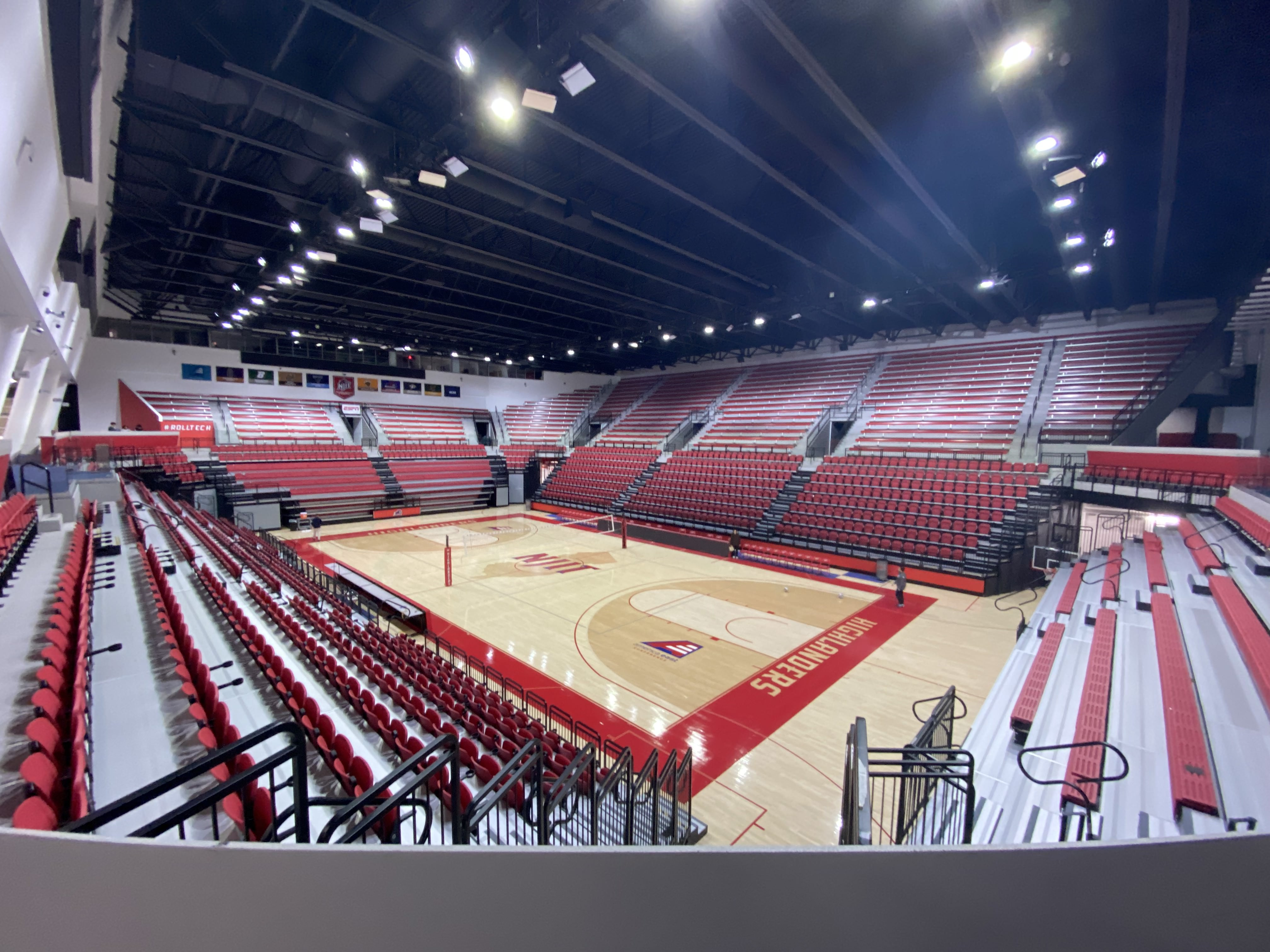
Wellness and Events Center, basketball venue

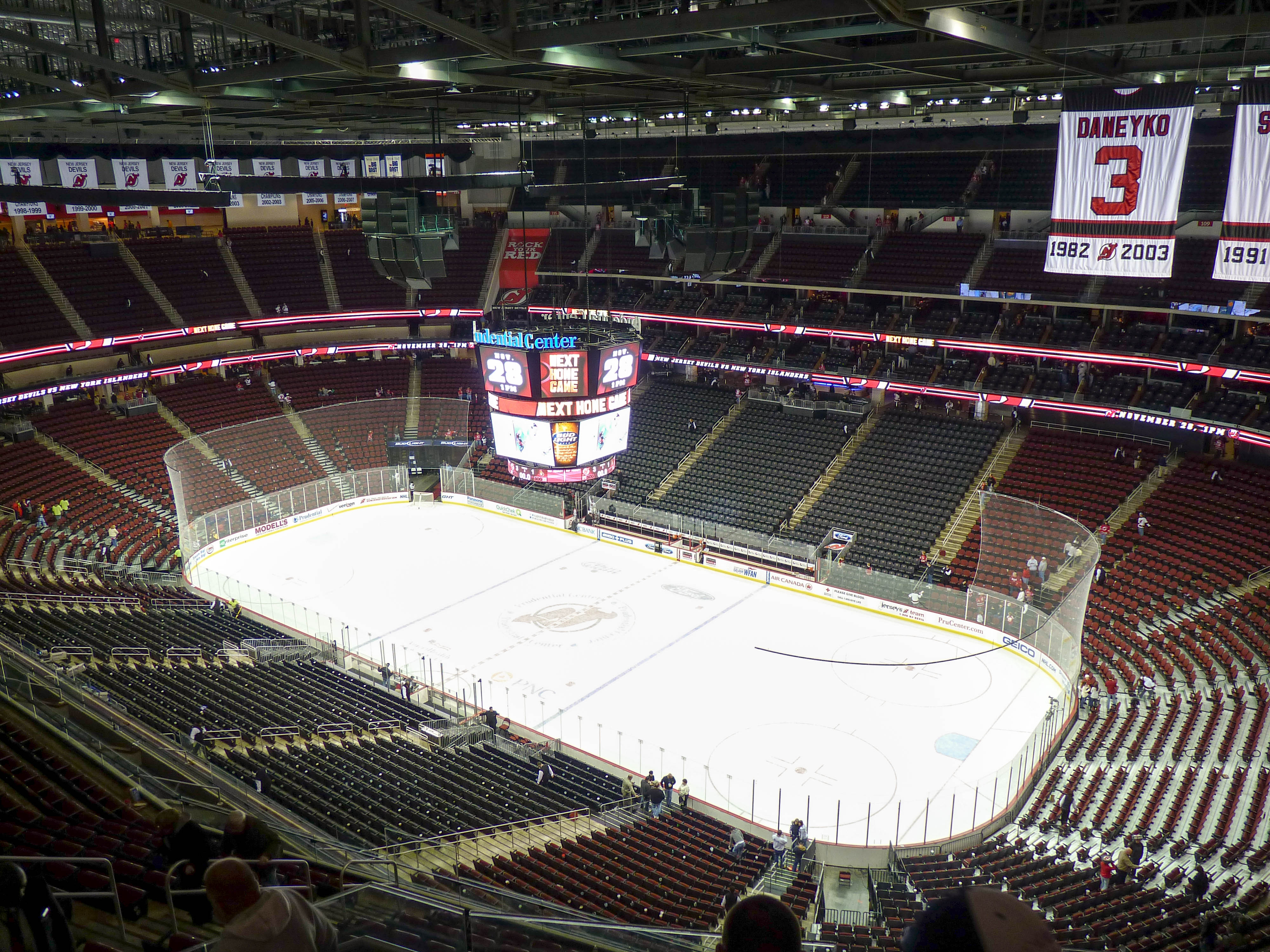
Prudential Center, ice hockey venue

Wellness and Events Center is home to the NJIT basketball teams. The ice hockey club team, competing in the Colonial States College Hockey Conference, play their home games at Prudential Center.

Branch Brook Park, located approximately a 1/2 mile away from campus is the home for NJIT cross country teams.

The Estelle and Zoom Fleisher Athletic Center, was the former athletic facility for the NJIT Highlanders. The facility and adjoining field were demolished in 2016 to make way for the Wellness & Events Center and Lubetkin Field at Mal Simon Stadium. Bears & Eagles Riverfront Stadium was the former home of the NJIT baseball team. The facility was demolished in 2019 to make way for a commercial-residential project named Riverfront Square.

== Recognitions ==
Men's soccer
In 1960, NJIT was NAIA men's soccer co-champions with Elizabethtown College. The title game went into four overtimes and ended in a 2–2 draw.

NCAA Division I men's basketball recognitions for futility
NJIT's men's basketball program set the record of the most winless team in D-I history in the 2007–2008 season with a losing streak of 51 games, breaking Sacramento State’s old D-I record. This acknowledgment has given NJIT's athletic program national recognition for futility. The unofficial NCAA record was set during NJIT's second NCAA Division I transitional season. It came despite a promising 5–24 debut Division I transitional season (2006–07) during which the team won its first two matches (away and home). With a new head coach (Jim Engles), an entirely new coaching staff and additional new recruits, the NJIT men's basketball team ended the 51-game losing streak on January 21, 2009, with a 61–51 win over the Bryant Bulldogs and finished the 2008–09 season with a 1–30 record. The Highlanders improved the following season (2009–10) and ended with a 10–21 record during its first official NCAA Division I season.

NJIT currently holds three NCAA Division I men's basketball reclassifying records:

- Defeats in a winless season: 29 games
- Consecutive defeats in a season: 29 games
- Consecutive defeats: 51 games

NCAA Division III men's basketball recognitions for best performances
Despite performing way below Division I standards during its reclassifying seasons from Division II, the Highlanders till this day still hold several Division III men's basketball records more than a decade after elevation from Division III. These records include:

- All-time best 3-point field-goal percentage in one season (67% by Reggie James in 1989).
- All-time second best 3-point field-goal percentage in one season (63.1% by Chris Miles in 1987).
- All-time third best 3-point field-goal percentage in one season (61.3% by Chris Miles in 1989).
- All-time highest number of blocked shots in one season (198 by Tory Black in 1997).
- All-time highest number of blocked shots per game in one season (7.62 by Tory Black in 1997).
- All-time highest 3-point field-goal percentage (minimum 100 made) by a team in one season (62% on 124 of 200 shootings in 1989).

== Noteworthy accomplishments in Division I ==
- Senior captain Sabrina Baby led the nation in women's volleyball digs per set in 2009. She was also selected as an Academic All-American (third-team) by College Sports Information Directors of America (CoSIDA).
- The women's volleyball team led the nation in digs per set in 2009.
- Christian Baumbach won the 101st annual IC4A Cross Country University Event race in 2009.
- The NJIT (club level) ice hockey team captured its first Great Northeast Collegiate Hockey Conference Division II championship title in 2011, by defeating Muhlenberg College 3–2 in overtime.
- The NJIT women's tennis team captured its first Great West Conference title beating North Dakota by a score of 4–2.
- The NJIT men's basketball team defeated the 17th ranked Michigan Wolverines, 72–70, on the road in its first game against a ranked opponent.
- Mamadou Guirassy won the NCAA Division I Golden Boots Award (soccer) in 2017.
- The NJIT men's soccer team captured its first ASUN tournament title in 2020.
- The men's baseball team earned NJIT's first victory in any sport in NCAA tournament play defeating Northeastern University, 3–2, in June 2021.
- The NJIT men and women's fencing teams finished fourth at the 2021 National Collegiate Men's and Women's Fencing Championships.
- The NJIT men's Tennis team captured its first Southland Conference Championship title in 2024.

== Notable Highlanders ==
- Raymond E. Blum (speed skating, class of 1950) member of the United States Olympic team participating in the 1948 Winter Olympics in St. Moritz, Switzerland.
- Hernan (Chico) Borja (men's soccer, 1977–1980), NCAA Division I First-Team All-American.

== See also ==
- List of NCAA Division I non-football programs
