= Fred Rust Ice Arena =

Multi-purpose arena at the University of Delaware

Coordinates: 39.665244°N 75.750561°W

- University of Delaware Ice Arena
- Interactive map of Fred Rust Ice Arena
- Location: 547 South College Avenue; Newark, Delaware 19716
- Owner: University of Delaware
- Operator: University of Delaware
- Capacity: 2,500 (hockey)
- Surface: 200' x 85'; 200' x 98'
- Public transit: DART First State bus: 16, 33, 46, 302

Construction
- Opened: 1971

Tenants
- Delaware Fightin' Blue Hens; Men's ice hockey (ACHA); Women's ice hockey (NCAA)

The Fred Rust Ice Arena or University of Delaware Ice Arena is a multi-purpose arena located on the campus of The University of Delaware located in Newark, Delaware. The facility is home to the Delaware Fightin' Blue Hens men's ice hockey and women's ice hockey teams.

== History ==
The Facility houses two ice sheets. The first sheet is located in the Fred Rust Arena and the second sheet is located in the Gold Arena which is a separate building. The Fred Rust Ice Arena, is a 2,500-seat regulation international-sized ice arena on the UD campus. The Fred Rust Ice Arena, originally named The Blue Arena, was built in 1988 and houses the Olympic-sized ice area, a VIP lounge, a pro shop, locker rooms, weight and fitness facility, ballet room, off-ice spinner and a concession area. The Gold Arena is the NHL-sized ice sheet and was constructed in 1971. The Gold arena sits adjacent to the Fred Rust on the UD campus.

The facility is home to the Delaware Fightin' Blue Hens men's and women's ice hockey teams. The men's team competes at the ACHA Division I level in the Eastern States Collegiate Hockey League; while the women's team competes at ACHA Women's Division II level in the Delaware Valley Collegiate Hockey Conference. Beginning with the 2025–26 season, it will be the home of the Blue Hens' NCAA Division I women's ice hockey program competing in the Atlantic Hockey America (AHA) conference. It is also home of the University of Delaware Figure Skating Club and University of Delaware Synchronized Skating Club.

The Ice Arena is also used for recreational sports by UD students and local public, as well as various local youth hockey programs, recreational and competitive figure skating.

== Ice Skating Science Development Center ==
The University of Delaware Ice Skating Science Development Center (ISSDC) is one of the world's leading training and research sites for the sport of figure skating. It uses the Fred Rust Ice Arena and the Gold Ice Arena, as well as strength and aerobic training rooms and dance studio. UD faculty have collaborated with the World and Olympic coaches to advance the body of knowledge in figure skating, and encompasses research areas of: sports medicine, exercise physiology, biomechanics and sports psychology.
