= LaHaye Ice Center =

Ice arena in Lynchburg, Virginia

Coordinates: 37.356701°N 79.171546°W

- Interactive map of LaHaye Ice Center
- Location: Lynchburg, Virginia, United States
- Owner: Liberty University
- Capacity: 4,000 (hockey)
- Surface: 200' x 85' (hockey)

Construction
- Groundbreaking: 2005
- Opened: 2006

Tenants
- Liberty Flames men's and women's hockey

The LaHaye Ice Center is a 4,000-seat ice arena located in Lynchburg, Virginia on the campus of Liberty University. The ice arena is also the home to the Liberty Flames men's and women's ice hockey teams that currently compete in the American Collegiate Hockey Association as independent teams in the ACHA Division I. In addition to LU's varsity teams, the Liberty JV team, Virginia Military Institute, and Lynchburg College teams at the ACHA Division II level playing in the Blue Ridge Hockey Conference also use the arena. LaHaye Ice Center also hosts Liberty’s synchronized skating teams. The arena is also used for various recreational uses by students and the local public for ice skating, figure skating, ice hockey, and broomball.

The arena is named after Tim LaHaye, who gave $4.5 million to Liberty University to build a new student center and School of Prophecy, which opened in January 2002. He also serves as its president. LaHaye also provided the funds for the LaHaye Ice Center on the campus of Liberty University, which opened in January 2006.

== Facilities ==
The 89,000-square-foot (8,300 m^{2}) ice arena includes an NHL regulation-sized ice sheet and has a seating capacity of 4,000 spectators, a media press box, a president's seating area, concession stand, pro shop with skate rental. The arena also houses offices for ice sports coaches and personnel and locker rooms. The Ice Center received renovations in the summer of 2008 when a Chancellor’s suite and two business suites were installed on one side of the rink. Improvements were also made to the rink’s upper level/balcony, with a new conference room, space for LU’s hockey coaches, a players’ lounge and a meeting area for media. The renovations also included a locker room for public use and a permanent locker for the Liberty women’s hockey team. The arena was completely renovated again in 2015, expanding capacity by more than 1,000 and adding to the building's concession offerings and locker room space. A new four-sided videoboard was also added in the renovation.

The first goal scored in the LaHaye Ice Center was January 13, 2006 by Flames senior forward Scott LaPeer, giving Liberty a 1-0 lead over George Mason University in a game the Flames would win. That season, the Flames advanced to the ACHA National Championship game, eventually losing in overtime, 7-6, to Oakland University (Michigan).
