= Super East Collegiate Hockey League =

Ice Hockey Tournament For Colleges in America

Super East Collegiate Hockey League (SECHL)
- Conference: ACHA
- Founded: 1995
- Commissioner: Rob Martinez
- Sports fielded: Men's ice hockey
- Division: Division II
- No. of teams: 15
- Region: Northeast
- Most recent champion: St. Bonaventure Bonnies (West) (2025–26)
- Website: Official website

The Super East Collegiate Hockey League (SECHL) is a collegiate club hockey league that plays at Division II of the American Collegiate Hockey Association (ACHA) at Division II.

The SECHL is one of the top leagues competing in ACHA Division II and plays at a similar skill level to ACHA Division I and NCAA Division III. Four previous SECHL members (Rutgers University, Drexel University, Stony Brook University, and New York University) have moved their programs to the ACHA Division I level. The league is very selective in accepting members and is made up of universities that recognize the importance of ice hockey.

On February 26th 2025, the SECHL announced a merger with the AAU's Upstate New York Club Hockey League (UNYCHL) for the 2025-26 season, with the two teams playing under the SECHL name in ACHA Division II. The six existing SECHL teams prior to the merger (Army, Clarkson, Marist, Montclair, Sacred Heart, and Siena) would make up the new SECHL East Division, while the SECHL West Division would be made up of former UNYCHL Tier I teams (Binghamton University, Niagara University, St. Bonaventure University, and later University at Buffalo). The other UNYCHL Tier I teams (Cornell University, SUNY Brockport, and SUNY Cortland) would not join the SECHL for the 2025-26 season, and would keep their ACHA Division II teams as independent programs.

The UNYCHL teams were further integrated in the 2026/27 season, when SUNY Brockport and SUNY Cortland moved their ACHA Division II teams to the conference (where they were previously independent), and Clarkson moved to the West Division.

== Format ==
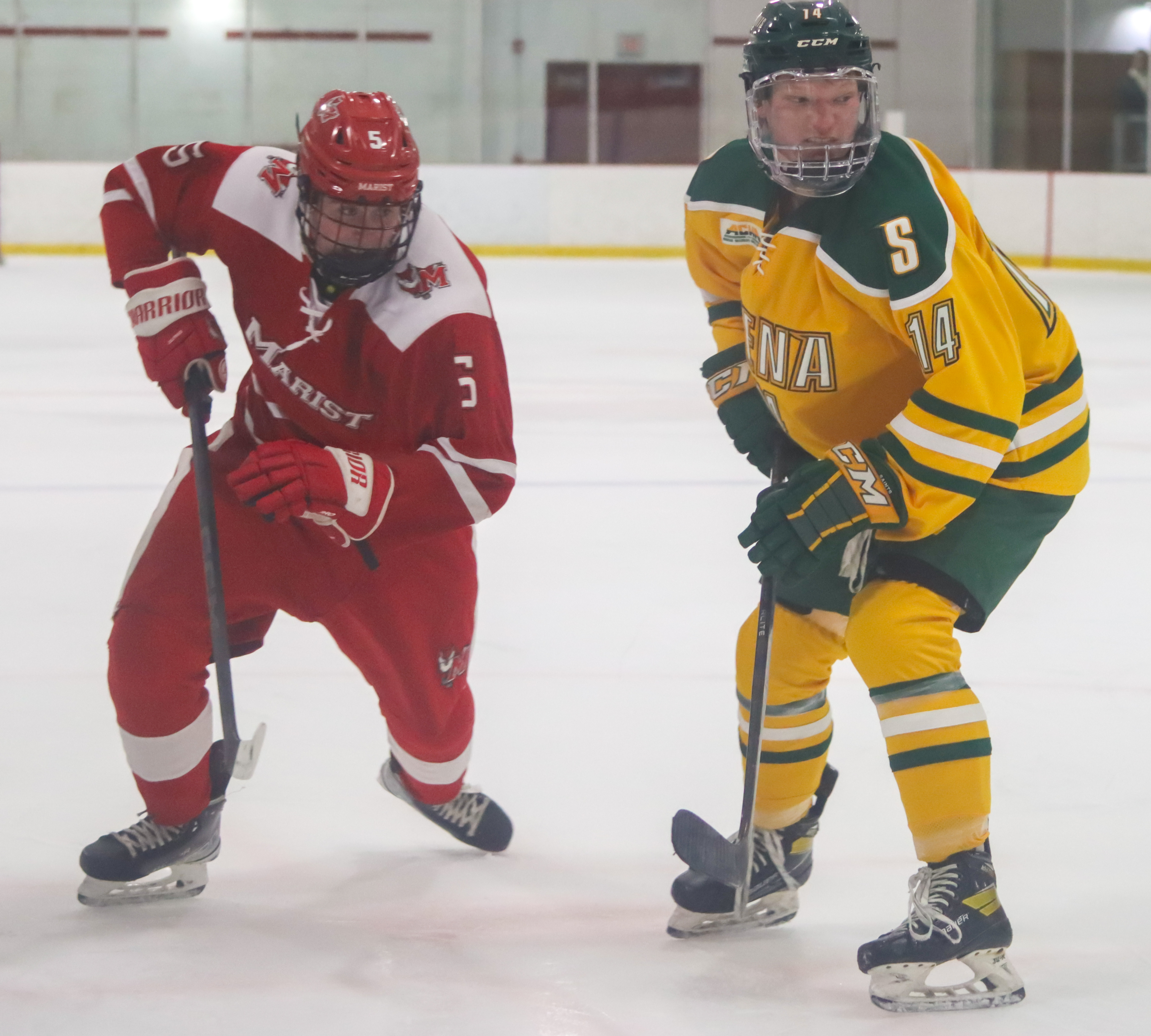
Marist and Siena play an SECHL playoff game in February 2024

Each team plays 12 conference games during a season against fellow SECHL teams, with one on the road and one at their home venue.

The top six teams qualify for the league playoffs which are held over the course of one weekend at the venue of the previous year's champion. All playoff games are single elimination with the winner advancing to the next round. The first and second seeds receive byes into the semifinal round while the remaining four teams play in the quarterfinals.

The SECHL changed formats for the 2025-26 season after incorporating the UNYCHL teams; the teams in each SECHL division will compete against one another and maintain separate divisional playoffs.

== Current teams ==
Division	Institution	City/State	Nickname	Primary Conference
East Division	Marist University	Poughkeepsie, NY	Red Foxes	Metro
East Division	Montclair State University	Montclair, NJ	Red Hawks	NJAC (D-III)
East Division	Quinnipiac University (Note: Quinnipiac has an NCAA Division I hockey team competing in the ECAC.)	Hamden, CT	Bobcats	Metro
East Division	Rider University	Lawrenceville, NJ	Broncs	Metro
East Division	Roger Williams University	Bristol, RI	Hawks	CNE (D-III)
East Division	Sacred Heart University (Note: Sacred Heart has an NCAA Division I hockey team competing in Atlantic Hockey America.)	Fairfield, CT	Pioneers	Metro
East Division	Siena University	Loudonville, NY	Saints	Metro
East Division	United States Military Academy (Note: Army has an NCAA Division I hockey team competing in Atlantic Hockey America.)	West Point, NY	Black Knights	Patriot League
West Division	Binghamton University	Vestal, NY	Bearcats	America East
West Division	Clarkson University (Note: Clarkson has an NCAA Division I hockey team competing in the ECAC.)	Potsdam, NY	Golden Knights	Liberty League
West Division	Niagara University (Note: Niagara has an NCAA Division I hockey team competing in Atlantic Hockey America.)	Lewiston, NY	Purple Eagles	Metro
West Division	St. Bonaventure University	Allegany, NY	Bonnies	A-10
West Division	SUNY Brockport	Brockport, NY	Golden Eagles	Empire 8 (D-III)
West Division	SUNY Cortland	Cortland, NY	Red Dragons	SUNYAC (D-III)
West Division	University at Buffalo	Buffalo, NY	Bulls	MAC

== Conference Champions ==
Note: SECHL maintained separate divisional playoffs from UNYCHL since merger in 2025/26 season

School	Championships	Runners-Up	Seasons in SECHL
Siena	4 (1999, 2000, 2003, 2008)	3 (2002, 2011, 2026-E)	31 (1995-present)
Army	4 (2022, 2023, 2024, 2026-E)	1 (2025)	7 (2018-present)
Clarkson	1 (2025)	1 (2022)	6 (2021-present)
Marist	1 (1997)	1 (1998)	31 (1995-present)
St. Bonaventure	1 (2026-W)	0	2 (2025-present)
Sacred Heart	0	3 (2022, 2023, 2024)	9 (2017-present)
Montclair State	0	2 (2009, 2010)	25 (2001-present)
Niagara	0	1 (2026-W)	2 (2025-present)
Binghamton	0	0	2 (2025-present)
Buffalo	0	0	2 (2025-present)
Brockport State	0	0	1 (2026-present)
Cortland	0	0	1 (2026-present)
Quinnipiac	0	0	1 (2026-present)
Rider	0	0	1 (2026-present)
Roger Williams	0	0	1 (2026-present)
Inactive schools
William Paterson	7 (2009, 2010, 2011, 2012, 2013, 2016, 2018)	3 (2014, 2015, 2017)	10 (2008-2018)
Stony Brook	4 (2004, 2005, 2006, 2007)	0	7 (2000-2007)
New York Univ.	3 (2002, 2015, 2017)	6 (2000, 2001, 2005, 2012, 2013, 2016)	17 (2000-2017)
New Hampshire	2 (2014, 2019)	0	13 (2006-2020)
RPI	1 (2020)	2 (2018, 2019)	5 (2015-2020)
Rutgers	1 (1998)	2 (1997, 1999)	4 (1995-1999)
Central Connecticut	1 (2001)	1 (2008)	25 (1998-2024)
Penn State	0	3 (2004, 2006, 2007)	5 (2003-2008)
Westfield State	0	1 (2003)	3 (2002-2005)
Hofstra	0	0	6 (1995-2001)
Holy Cross	0	0	5 (2006-2011)
Albany	0	0	5 (2000-2005)
Wagner	0	0	5 (1995-2000)
Western Connecticut	0	0	4 (2010-2014)
Monmouth	0	0	2 (1999-2001)
Drexel	0	0	2 (1995-1997)
UConn	0	0	1 (2014-2015)
Southern Connecticut	0	0	1 (1997-1998)

== Regionals and Nationals Results ==
Since 2013/14 season

Year	Institution	Seed (Note: All seedings for national and regional tournaments place the SECHL in the Northeast region)	Result	Games	References
2014	New York Univ.	#3	Nationals - 2nd (pool)	1-0 W vs Florida Gulf Coast; 3-5 L vs Lindenwood; 3-0 W vs Utah State	
2014	New Hampshire	#2	NATIONAL CHAMPIONS	?-? W vs Northern Arizona ?-? W vs Grand Valley State ?-? L vs Liberty College; 4-0 W vs UMBC (semifinal); 5-3 W vs Florida Gulf Coast (final)	
2014	William Paterson	#1	Nationals - 3rd (pool)	4-1 W vs San Jose State; 6-7 L vs SIU Edwardsville; 3-5 L vs UNBC	
2015	Montclair State	#2	Nationals - 2nd (pool)	7-1 W vs Toledo; 5-3 W vs Michigan State; 0-5 L vs Arizona State (Elite)	
2015	New York Univ.	#3	NATIONAL CHAMPIONS	3-1 W vs Northern Arizona; 6-5 OTW vs Grand Valley State; 1-9 L vs Liberty Univ. 8-1 W vs Lindenwood (semifinal); 5-4 W vs Florida Gulf Coast (final)	
2015	William Paterson	#1	Nationals - 2nd (pool)	5-1 W vs Boise State; 4-5 OTL vs Lindenwood; 7-3 W vs Miami-OH	
2016	Marist	#10	Regionals - Round 1	3-4 L vs Montclair State	
2016	Montclair State	#11	Regionals - Round 2	4-3 W vs Marist; 4-6 L vs New Hampshire	
2016	New York Univ.	#2	Nationals - 2nd (pool)	8-2 W vs Penn State; 4-5 L vs Utah State; 3-4 OTL vs Grand Valley State	
2016	William Paterson	#1	Nationals - 2nd (pool)	6-1 W vs Lindenwood; 5-1 W vs Arizona State (Maroon); 4-5 OTL vs Liberty Univ.	
2017	New Hampshire	#3	Regionals - Round 2	8-2 W vs Sacred Heart; 1-5 L vs RPI	
2017	New York Univ.	#2	NATIONAL CHAMPIONS	2-2 T vs Aurora; 6-2 W vs Utah State; 3-2 OTW vs Florida Gulf Coast; 6-4 W vs Miami-OH (semifinal); 4-3 W vs Liberty Univ. (final)	
2017	RPI	#6	Nationals - 3rd (pool)	3-0 W vs UMass (regionals); 5-1 W vs New Hampshire (regionals); 1-5 L vs Lindenwood; 2-1 W vs Northern Arizona; 3-5 L vs Miami-OH	
2017	Sacred Heart	#11	Regionals - Round 2	2-1 W vs Eastern Connecticut; 2-8 L vs New Hampshire	
2017	William Paterson	#1	Nationals - 2nd (pool)	6-3 W vs Ohio; 3-1 W vs UNLV; 3-4 L vs Grand Valley State	
2018	Marist	#10	Regionals - Round 1	1-2 L vs Providence	
2018	New Hampshire	#3	Nationals - Semifinals	7-2 W vs Providence (regionals); 7-3 W vs Connecticut College (regionals); 6-5 W vs Trine; 6-5 W vs Northern Arizona; 6-5 OTW vs Toledo; 3-8 L vs Florida Gulf Coast (semifinal)	
2018	RPI	#6	Regionals - Round 2	2-6 L vs Connecticut College	
2018	Sacred Heart	#12	Regionals - Round 1	2-7 L vs Boston College	
2018	William Paterson	#1	Nationals - 2nd (pool)	8-6 W vs Adrian College; 5-4 W vs Northern Colorado; 1-5 L vs Florida Gulf Coast	
2019	New Hampshire	#2	Nationals - 2nd (pool)	6-1 W vs Utah State; 4-3 W vs Marian; 2-7 L vs Florida Gulf Coast	
2019	RPI	#5	Regionals - Round 3	5-1 W vs Erie C.C. 3-6 L vs Keene State	
2020	Marist	#12	Regionals - Round 1	1-6 L vs Sacred Heart	
2020	New Hampshire	#4	Regionals - Round 3	5-2 W vs Sacred Heart; 2-3 OTL vs Northeastern	
2020	RPI	#3	Regionals - Round 3	8-2 W vs Bryant; 3-7 L vs Roger Williams	
2020	Sacred Heart	#9	Regionals - Round 2	6-1 W vs Marist; 2-5 L vs New Hampshire	
2021	SECHL did not participate in 2020-21 ACHA M2 season due to the COVID-19 pandemic				
2022	Army	#9	Regionals - Round 1	3-4 OTL vs Merrimack	
2022	Clarkson	#13	Regionals - Round 2	3-2 W vs Sacred Heart; 2-7 L vs Keene State	
2022	Sacred Heart	#8	Regionals - Round 1	2-3 L vs Clarkson	
2023	Army	#5	Regionals - Round 2	5-9 L vs Boston University	
2023	Sacred Heart	#9	Regionals - Round 2	5-0 W vs RPI; 2-3 L vs New Hampshire	
2024	Army	#5	Nationals - 3rd (pool)	6-5 W vs Boston Univ. (regionals); 4-1 W vs UMass (regionals); 5-8 L vs Lindenwood; 3-6 L vs Liberty; 5-4 OTW vs Univ. of Providence	
2024	Clarkson	#11	Regionals - Round 1	1-2 OTL vs Saint Anselm	
2024	Sacred Heart	#8	Regionals - Round 2	6-1 W vs UConn; 2-1 OTL vs UMass	
2024	Siena	#12	Regionals - Round 1	2-6 L vs Boston Univ.	
2025	Army	#1	Nationals - 3rd (pool)	4-3 OTW vs Texas; 2-4 L vs St. Thomas; 1-3 L vs Liberty	
2025	Sacred Heart	#9	Regionals - Round 1	0-3 L vs Boston Univ.	
2026	Army	#5	Nationals - 2nd (pool)	8-2 W vs Boston College (regionals); 5-2 W vs UMass (regionals); 7-6 OTW vs Tampa; 1-10 L vs Oklahoma State; 5-3 W vs Michigan State	
2026	Binghamton	#8	Regionals - Round 1	2-3 L v s Northeastern	
2026	Niagara	#1	Nationals - 3rd (pool)	10-1 W vs West Chester (regionals); 3-1 W vs Boston Univ. (regionals); 1-5 L vs Penn State; 3-1 W vs Montana State; 6-5 W vs Schoolcraft College	
2026	Sacred Heart	#14	Regionals - Round 1	2-3 L vs St. Bonaventure	
2026	Siena	#13	Regionals - Round 1	2-5 L vs UMass	
2026	St. Bonaventure	#3	Nationals - 2nd (pool)	3-2 W vs Sacred Heart (regionals); 6-2 W vs RPI (regionals); 4-3 W vs Florida Atlantic; 6-3 W vs Utah State; 3-4 L vs St. Thomas	

== See also ==
- American Collegiate Hockey Association
- List of ice hockey leagues
