= Metropolitan Collegiate Hockey Conference =

ACHA Division 3 club hockey league

- Sport: Club hockey
- Founded: 1976
- Division: ACHA Division III
- No. of teams: 19
- Headquarters: New Paltz, New York
- Region: Northeast

The Metropolitan Collegiate Hockey Conference or MCHC is an ACHA Division 3 club hockey league made up of smaller colleges, universities, and community colleges in the NYC Metro Area. The league was originally formed in 1967–68 as the Metropolitan Intercollegiate Hockey League (MIHL). After a league name change to the BSMIHL (Bi-State Metropolitan Intercollegiate Hockey League) for the 1975–76 season, the league changed its name to its current moniker at the start of the 1976–77 season.

== Format ==
Metropolitan Division Teams play a 10-game league schedule, with the top 5 teams advancing to the MCHC playoffs at the end of the regular season, typically held during the third weekend in February.

For the 2026–27 Season, the MCHC broke out the Atlantic Division into East and West. The East Division has 7 teams (12-game season), and the West has 6 teams (10-game season). The top 3 teams in each division qualify for the Atlantic Division Playoffs. The 1st-place teams also qualify for the Metropolitan Division Playoffs. The Atlantic Division Playoffs will take place the last weekend in February.

There are 17 schools listed below, but Rutgers and Sacred Heart will each have an ACDC team, bringing the total number of teams to 19.

== Current Teams ==
School	Location	Founded	Affiliation	Nickname	Colors
Columbia University	Manhattan, NY	1754	Ivy League	Lions	
Fairfield University	Fairfield, CT	1942	Private/Catholic	Stags	
Fordham University	Bronx, NY	1841	Private/Jesuit	Rams	
Hofstra University	Hempstead, NY	1935	Private	Pride	
SUNY Maritime	Bronx, NY	1938	Public College	Privateers	
New Jersey Institute of Technology	Newark, NJ	1881	Public	Highlanders	
Rutgers University	New Brunswick, NJ	1766	Public	Scarlet Knights	
Sacred Heart University	Fairfield, CT	1963	Private/Catholic	Pioneers	
Seton Hall University	South Orange, NJ	1856	Private/Catholic	Pirates	
St. John's University	Queens, NY	1870	Private/Catholic	Red Storm	
St. Thomas Aquinas College	Rockland County, NY	1952	Private/Dominican	Spartans	
Stevens Institute of Technology	Hoboken, NJ	1870	Private/Non-sectarian	Ducks	
Stony Brook University	Stony Brook, NY	1957	Public	Seawolves	
The College of New Jersey	Ewing, NJ	1855	Public	Lions	
US Merchant Marine Academy	Kings Point, NY	1943	United States service academies	Mariners	
Western Connecticut State University	Danbury, CT	1903	Public University	Colonials	
Yeshiva University	New York, NY	1886	Private	Maccabees	

== Affiliate Teams ==
School	Location	Founded	Affiliation	Nickname	Colors

== Former Teams ==
School	Location	Founded	Affiliation	Nickname	Colors
Adelphi University	Garden City, NY	1896	Private	Panthers	
University at Albany	Albany, NY	1844	Public	Great Danes	
Binghamton University	Binghamton, NY	1946	Public	Bearcats	
Briarcliffe College	Bethpage, NY	1966 (Closed 2018)	Private	Bulldogs	
University of Bridgeport	Bridgeport, CT	1927	Private	Purple Knights	
Brooklyn College	Brooklyn, NY	1930	Public	Bulldogs (formerly Kingsmen)	
Cook College	North Brunswick, NJ	1862	Public	Aggies	
City College of New York	New York, NY	1847	Public	Beavers	
County College of Morris	Randolph, NJ	1968	Public	Titans	
Delaware County Community College	Marple Township, PA	1967	Public	Phantoms	
Fairleigh Dickinson University	Teaneck, NJ	1942	Private	Knights	
Farmingdale State College	Farmingdale, NY	1912	Public College	Rams	
University of Hartford	West Hartford, CT	1957	Private	Hawks	
Iona College	New Rochelle, NY	1940	Private/Catholic	Gaels	
John Jay College	New York, NY	1964	Public	Bloodhounds	
Kean University	Union, NJ	1855	Public	Cougars	
Lehman College	Bronx, NY	1967	Public	Lightning	
LIU Post	Brookville, NY	1954	Private	Sharks (formerly Pioneers)	
Manhattan University	Riverdale, NY	1853	Private/Catholic	Jaspers	
Marist University	Poughkeepsie, NY	1929	Private	Red Foxes	
Monmouth University	West Long Branch, NJ	1933	Private	Hawks	
Montclair State University	Montclair, NJ	1908	Public	Red Hawks	
Nassau Community College	Garden City, NY	1959	Public	Lions	
New York Institute of Technology	New York, NY	1955	Private	Bears	
SUNY New Paltz	New Paltz, NY	1828	Public	Hawks	
New York University	New York, NY	1831	Private	Violets	
Ocean County College	Toms River, NJ	1964	Public	Vikings	
Pace University	New York, NY	1906	Private	Setters	
Queens College	Queens, NY	1937	Public	Knights	
Ramapo College	Mahwah, NJ	1969	Public	Roadrunners	
Raritan Valley Community College	Branchburg, NJ	1965	Public	Golden Lions	
Rider University	Lawrenceville, NJ	1865	Private	Broncs	
Rockland Community College	Suffern, NY	1959	Public	Fighting Hawks	
St. Francis College	Brooklyn Heights, NY	1859	Private/Catholic	Terriers	
The College of St. Rose	Albany, NY	1920	Private/Catholic	Golden Knights	
Siena University	Loudonville, NY	1937	Private/Catholic	Saints	
Skidmore College	Saratoga Springs, NY	1922	Private	Thoroughbreds	
Southern Connecticut State University	New Haven, CT	1893	Public	Owls	
Suffolk County Community College	Long Island, NY	1959	Community College	Sharks	
Union College	Schenectady, NY	1795	Private	Dutchmen	
Upsala College	East Orange, NJ	1893 (Closed 1995)	Private	Vikings	
Wagner College	Staten Island, NY	1883	Private	Seahawks	
William Paterson University	Wayne, NJ	1855	Public	Pioneers	
Yale University	New Haven, CT	1701	Ivy League	Bulldogs	

== Conference Champions ==
- 2026 (Atlantic) - Fairfield University
- 2026 (Metro) - Sacred Heart University
- 2025 - Sacred Heart University
- 2024 - Sacred Heart University
- 2023 - Sacred Heart University
- 2022 - Columbia University
- 2021 - Season Canceled Due to COVID-19
- 2020 - US Merchant Marine Academy
- 2019 - Fordham University
- 2018 - Fordham University
- 2017 - Ramapo College
- 2016 - Yale University
- 2015 - Stevens Institute of Technology
- 2014 - Fordham University
- 2013 - State University of New York Maritime College
- 2012 - County College of Morris
- 2011 - Wagner College
- 2010 - Fordham University
- 2009 - University of Albany
- 2008 - Farmingdale State College
- 2007 - University of Albany
- 2006 - Fordham University
- 2005 - University of Albany
- 2004 - Wagner College
- 2003 - County College of Morris
- 2002 - Wagner College
- 2001 - Wagner College
- 2000 - Stony Brook University
- 1999 - Wagner College
- 1998 - Wagner College
- 1997 - Wagner College
- 1996 - Marist College
- 1995 - Rutgers University
- 1994 - Rutgers University
- 1993 - Siena College
- 1992 - Marist College
- 1991 - Southern Connecticut State University
- 1990 - Rutgers University
- 1989 - Rutgers University / County College of Morris
- 1988 - Rutgers University
- 1987 - County College of Morris
- 1986 - Montclair State University
- 1985 - Manhattan College
- 1984 - Manhattan College / Southern Connecticut State University / Wagner College
- 1983 - Wagner College
- 1982 - Upsala College
- 1981 - Upsala College
- 1980 - Queens College
- 1979 - Queens College
- 1978 - Upsala College / Wagner College
- 1977 - Fairleigh Dickinson University / Iona College
- 1976 - Ramapo College / Rockland Community College
- 1975 - Fairfield University / Ramapo College
- 1974 - Fairfield University
- 1973 - Fairfield University
- 1972 - Nassau Community College
- 1971 - St. Francis College
- 1970 - St. Francis College
- 1969 - St. Francis College
- 1968 - Iona College

== See also ==
- American Collegiate Hockey Association
- List of ice hockey leagues
