= Delaware Valley Collegiate Hockey Conference =

Delaware Valley College Hockey Conference
- Conference: Collegiate Hockey Federation
- Founded: 1971
- Sports fielded: Men's and Women's ice hockey
- Division: (Men) Division II & Division III CHF (Women) Division I&II acha
- No. of teams: 10
- Region: Mid Atl/N East
- Website: Official website

The Delaware Valley Collegiate Hockey Conference (DVCHC) is a collegiate hockey conference associated with the Collegiate Hockey Federation (CHF) and independent women's university teams. The conference has men's teams that compete within divisions II and III of the CHF and women's teams that compete in divisions II and III of the ACHA.

The DVCHC founding president was Finbarr O'Connor. O'Connor was Head Coach of the Saint Joseph's University team, league President for 10 seasons, and coached Saint Joseph's for 35 years. He was inducted into the Saint Joseph's University Athletic Hall of Fame in 2004.

The first season (1971–1972), The league consisted of six teams: Bryn Athyn College, LaSalle University, St. Joseph's University, University of Delaware, Villanova University, and West Chester University.

== Format ==
The Men's Division has 24 current members that are split into three divisions. The National is considered the higher division. The season ends each year with division playoffs.

The Women's Division has 14 current members split in two divisions. Division 2 has a North and a South section whereas all of the teams in Division 1 are in one section.

== Current Men's teams ==
=== Tournament Bound ===
Institution	Location	Nickname	Enrollment	Established
Millersville University of Pennsylvania	Millersville, PA	Marauders	6,500	1855
Alvernia University	Reading, PA	Golden Wolves	2,900	1958
La Salle University	Philadelphia, PA	Explorers	3,164	1863
Bloomsburg University of Pennsylvania	Bloomsburg, PA	Huskies	9,201	1839
Penn State Harrisburg	Lower Swatara Township, PA	Nittany Lions	4,519	1966
Kutztown University of Pennsylvania	Kutztown, PA	Golden Bears	7,391	1866
University of Delaware	Newark, DE	Blue Hens	19,391	1743
Salisbury University	Salisbury, MD	Sea Gulls	10,529	1925
Catholic University of America	Washington D.C.	Cardinals	5,956	
Neumann University	Aston, Pennsylvania	Knights	3,011	1965

=== Non-Tournament Bound ===
Institution	Location	Nickname	Enrollment	Established
Kutztown University of Pennsylvania	Kutztown, PA	Bears	8,500	1866
Lafayette College	Easton, PA	Leopards	2,729	1826
Rutgers University-Camden	Camden, NJ	Raptors	4,497	1766
Widener University	Philadelphia, PA	Pride	3,204	1862
Dickinson College	Carlisle, PA	Red Devils	2,173	1773
Franklin & Marshall College	Lancaster, PA	Diplomats	2,324	1787
Johns Hopkins University	Baltimore, MD	Blue Jays	20,848	1876
York College of Pennsylvania	York, PA	Spartans	5,564	1876
Gettysburg College	Gettysburg, PA	Bullets	2,700	1832
Bucknell University	Lewisburg, PA	Bison	3,600	1846
Susquehanna University	Selinsgrove, PA	River Hawks	2,203	1858
UMBC	Catonsville, Maryland	UMBC Retrievers	13,767	1966

== Current Women's teams ==
=== Division II ===
Institution	Location	Nickname	Enrollment	Established
U.S. Naval Academy	Annapolis, MD	Midshipman	4,400	
Liberty University	Lynchburg, VA	Eagles	48,900	
University of Delaware	Newark, DE	Blue Hens	23,613	
University of Maryland	College Park, MD	Terrapins	37,610	
University of Pennsylvania	Philadelphia, PA	Quakers	10,394	
Rowan University	Glassboro, NJ	Profs	10,750	
Villanova University	Villanova, PA	Wildcats	6,335	

=== Division III ===
Institution	Location	Nickname	Enrollment	Established
Loyola University Maryland	Baltimore, MD	Greyhounds		
Montclair State University	Montclair, NJ	Redhawks		
West Chester University	West Chester, PA	Rams		
Lafayette College	Easton, PA	Leopards		
St. Joseph's University	Philadelphia, PA	Hawks		
George Mason University	Fairfax, VA	Patriots		
Slippery Rock University	Slippery Rock, PA	Pride	8,500	
Indiana University of Pennsylvania	Indiana, PA	Crimson Hawks	12,827	

== Men's Championships ==
=== National (2022-present) ===
- 2025-Penn State Harrisburg defeated Kutztown University of Pennsylvania
- 2024-Penn State Harrisburg defeated Neumann
- 2023-University of Delaware

=== American (2022-present) ===
- 2025-Alvernia University defeated Salisbury
- 2024-Alvernia University defeated Bucknell University
- 2023-Widener University

=== Patriot (2022-present) ===
- 2025-Bucknell University defeated Gettysburg College
- 2024-Franklin & Marshall College defeated Penn State Altoona
- 2023-Johns Hopkins University

=== Tournament Bound (2021-2022) ===
- 2022-Alvernia University
- 2021-not played (COVID-19)

=== Non-tournament Bound (2021-2022) ===
- 2022-Bucknell University
- 2021-not played (COVID-19)

=== Division II (1972-2005 & 2018-2020) ===
- 2020- Kutztown University of Pennsylvania defeated Penn State Harrisburg
- 2019- Drexel University
- 2018- Lafayette College
- 2006- University of Scranton defeated The College of New Jersey 2 games to 1
- 2005- Temple University
- 2004- Temple University
- 2003- Temple University
- 2002- Lafayette College
- 2001- Lafayette College
- 2000- University of Pennsylvania
- 1999- Saint Joseph's University
- 1998- Saint Joseph's University
- 1997- Princeton University
- 1996- Princeton University
- 1995- Millersville University of Pennsylvania
- 1994- Kutztown University of Pennsylvania
- 1993- Millersville University of Pennsylvania
- 1992- Millersville University of Pennsylvania & Franklin & Marshall College
- 1991- Franklin & Marshall College
- 1990- Temple University
- 1989- Franklin & Marshall College
- 1988- Drexel University
- 1987- Drexel University
- 1986- La Salle University
- 1985- Drexel University
- 1984- Saint Joseph's University
- 1983- La Salle University
- 1982- Saint Joseph's University
- 1981- Saint Joseph's University
- 1980- Lafayette College
- 1979- Lafayette College
- 1978- Thomas Jefferson University, known as Textile at the time
- 1977- Drexel University
- 1976- University of Delaware
- 1975- University of Delaware
- 1974- West Chester University
- 1973- University of Delaware
- 1972- Bryn Athyn College & West Chester University

=== Division 3 National Division (2003-2020) ===
- 2020- University of Delaware defeated Stockton University
- 2019- George Mason University
- 2018- George Mason University
- 2017- Bryn Athyn College
- 2016- Bryn Athyn College
- 2015- Bryn Athyn College (Beat Richard Stockton)
- 2014- Neumann (Beat Bryn Athyn College in Best of three 2-0)
- 2013- Neumann (Beat Alvernia in Best of three 2-0)
- 2012- Penn State Brandywine (Beat Alvernia in Best of Three 2-1)
- 2011- West Chester University
- 2010- Penn State Brandywine
- 2009- Monmouth University
- 2008- Lehigh University
- 2007- Penn State-Berks
- 2006- Penn State-Berks
- 2005- Penn State-Berks
- 2004- Penn State-Berks
- 2003- Penn State-Berks

=== Division 3 American Division (2011-2020) ===
- 2020- Catholic University of America defeated Rutgers University-Camden
- 2019- Rutgers University-Camden
- 2018- Bucknell University
- 2017- Rutgers University-Camden
- 2016- Johns Hopkins University
- 2015- Rutgers University-Camden
- 2014- Rowan
- 2013- Bryn Athyn College
- 2012- Rowan University
- 2011- Bloomsburg University of Pennsylvania

=== Division 3 Patriot Division (2018-2020) ===
- 2020- York College of Pennsylvania defeated Gettysburg College
- 2019- Catholic University of America
- 2018- Franklin & Marshall College

== Women's Championships ==
- 2026- D2: Liberty University | D3: Slippery Rock University
- 2025- D2: Villanova | D3: Slippery Rock University
- 2024- D2: Villanova | D3: Pennsylvania
- 2023- D2: Navy | D3: Slippery Rock University
- 2022- D2: Navy | D3: Saint Joseph's University
- 2021- Season Cancelled (Pandemic)
- 2020- D2: Rowan | D3: Lafayette
- 2019- D2: Rowan | D3: Saint Joseph's University
- 2018- D2: Montclair State | D3: Virginia
- 2017- D2: Villanova | D3: Rowan
- 2016- D1: Towson | D2: Columbia
- 2015- D1: Towson | D2: Rowan
- 2014- D1: Towson | D2: Pennsylvania
- 2013- D1: West Chester | D2: Rutgers
- 2012- D1: West Chester | D2: Rutgers
- 2011- D1: California (PA) | D2: Navy
- 2010- D1: Virginia | D2: Slippery Rock
- 2009- D1: Virginia | D2: California (PA)
- 2008- D1: Delaware | D2: West Chester
- 2007- D1: American
- 2006- D1: Virginia
- 2005- D1: Pennsylvania
- 2004- D1: Pennsylvania
- 2003- D1: Penn State

== See also ==
- American Collegiate Hockey Association
- List of ice hockey leagues
