= Roosevelt Lakers women's ice hockey =

- University: Roosevelt University
- Conference: Central Collegiate Women's Hockey Association
- Governing Body: ACHA Women's Division 1
- Head coach: Tony Brogan; 1st season, 0–0–0
- Assistant coaches: None
- Captain(s): None
- Alternate captain(s): None
- Arena: Edge Ice Arena; Chicago, Illinois
- Colors: Green and White

ACHA tournament champions
- 2005, 2007

ACHA tournament appearances
- 2004, 2005, 2006, 2007, 2008, 2009, 2010, 2011, 2012, 2013, 2014

Conference tournament champions
- CCWHA: 2012

Conference regular season champions
- CCWHA: 2012, 2013

The Roosevelt Lakers women's ice hockey team represents Roosevelt University (RU) in Women's Division 1 of the American Collegiate Hockey Association (ACHA) and in the Central Collegiate Women's Hockey Association (CCWHA), following the absorption of Robert Morris University Illinois (RMU) and several of RMU's athletic teams, including women's ice hockey, that was finalized in 2020.

Prior to the merger RMU, known as the Eagles, was one of the ACHA's historically dominant programs, a status that included a pair of national championships (in 2005 and 2007), as well as a national-best five winners of the Zoë M. Harris Award as the ACHA's player of the year. RMU made 11 appearances at the ACHA National Tournament, a count that also placed near the top of the association.

Mason Strom was hired as the team's seventh full-time head coach for the 2018–19 season and the first year of the team's identity as the Lakers will be his third overall.

== History ==
=== Robert Morris University Illinois (2003–20) ===
==== Instant dynasty (2003–08) ====
Robert Morris College (as the school was known until May 1, 2009) added women's hockey to its athletic department for the 2003–04 season.

The Eagles, under head coach John Burke, quickly assembled a roster that featured stars like co-captains Leah Johnson and Krista Sleen, as well as Warroad, Minnesota product Lisa Gens. Beginning a trend in the program that continues to the present, the inaugural roster was geographically diverse, featuring players local to Chicago and Illinois, but also from places as far away as Texas and Washington. From the program's inaugural game, a 10–0 victory at then-home Glacier Ice Arena in Vernon Hills, Illinois against Notre Dame on October 10, 2003, RMC had little issue with most ACHA competition, losing within the association only to eventual national champion Wisconsin and emerging power Lindenwood during the regular season. The program captured its first trophy midway through the year by taking first place at the White Out Tournament, hosted by UMass and the first mid-season showcase event held within the ACHA's women's divisions. That title also led to Robert Morris' first-ever number one ranking in the ACHA polls, in Ranking 3 of that season. The Eagles would retain the top position for ten ranking periods, spanning two and a half seasons (a time-period reign that was eventually matched by Lindenwood from 2009 to 2011 but has never been exceeded).

As the ACHA's top-ranked team, RMC was invited to the 2004 ACHA National Tournament, held in East Lansing, Michigan. However, the Eagles dropped their opener to No. 8 Colorado despite goals by Leah Johnson, Kathleen Johnson and Mindy Shelton, a defeat that eventually cost the squad a spot in the semifinals, before dumping No. 12 University of Pennsylvania and then tying No. 11 Penn State in a consolation game to finish sixth.

An already-strong team got even stronger in the seasons that followed thanks largely to its 2004 entering class, which went on to become one of the most decorated in ACHA history. Erie, Pennsylvania's Savannah Varner, the ACHA's 2006–07 Zoë M. Harris Player of the Year and an All-American in 2004–05, 2005–06, and 2007–08 headlined the group, which also featured NCAA transfers Crystal Zace (a goaltender from Bemidji State) and Jennifer Norris (a defenseman from Wisconsin–Stevens Point). Other standouts included Katie Kosobucki, another Warroad High School graduate, and Ashley Boye from the noted Belle Tire youth program in Michigan.

From the 2004–05 season through 2007–08, the Eagles lost just ten games against ACHA competition, all against perennial contenders Lindenwood and Michigan State. That reality, in part, led to RMC frequently seeking outside challenges, most significantly from NCAA Division III and U Sports (then called CIS) competition. Throughout the 2000s, Robert Morris schedules generally numbered between 40 and 45 games, with the 2006–07 slate serving as representative: 25–2–1 in 28 ACHA games, 5–4–1 in ten games against NCAA squads, and 0–5–0 versus CIS foes.

During the 2005–06 season, RMC traveled to Tallinn, Estonia to compete in a tournament against seven European teams, and hosted by the Estonian Ice Hockey Association in an effort to get the brand-new Estonia women's national ice hockey team off the ground. The Eagles beat Estonia by a 5–0 count in their tournament opener the day after Estonia defeated Iceland in their first-ever international contest. Thanks to Varner's hat trick, RMC routed British side Kingston Diamonds 8–0 to capture the title, after also defeating Coventry Phoenix (Great Britain), KFS Wildcats (Denmark), and a team from Riga, Latvia.

Stateside, the Eagles' dominance in the ACHA made invitations to nationals a foregone conclusion, with the season's success usually ultimately hinging on the last words against other top squads. The team qualified for the ACHA semifinals for six consecutive seasons from 2004–05 through 2009–10, with the first five of that run featuring championship game appearances.

===== 2005 national championship =====
The 2005 ACHA National Tournament was held outside of Buffalo, New York, with the Eagles entering the competition as the top seed, and in Pool A with hosting University at Buffalo and North Country Community College. RMC opened by battering UB by an 8–0 count on March 10, 2015, a contest in which the Bulls were held to just three shots on goal, behind two tallies by Leah Johnson and three by Boye. Burke's charges didn't have much more of an issue in the pool and quarterfinal bid clincher against NCCC, as the team scored four goals shorthanded, three by Varner, in a 7–2 victory. The ACHA, at the time, played its quarterfinal and semifinal rounds on the same day, forcing the Eagles to follow up their pool wins by defeating two strong opponents with only about seven hours between games. Fifth-ranked Western Michigan opened the rigorous stretch by handing the Eagles their first and only deficit of the tournament on a Jennifer Goscicki goal just 1:27 into the game. However, two goals from Boye, and one each from Johnson and Mindy Shelton put RMC ahead 4–2 by the end of the first period on the way to a 9–3 win. That evening, a Crystal Randall shutout helped Robert Morris past frequent nationals nemesis Rhode Island and into the championship game by a 4–0 count. The final, against Michigan State, was also largely drama-free, as the Eagles led 2–0 within the first minute of play thanks to Norris and Varner. Zace largely shut down the Spartans from there, and the RMC onslaught wrapped up with a 7–1 title win.

RMC's 2004–05 campaign remains one of the most dominant in ACHA history. The Eagles were the association's top-ranked team wire to wire, and were 20–0–0 against ACHA competition. Sleen won the Zoë M. Harris Award as the ACHA's player of the year, while Johnson was the national tournament most valuable player, and Varner, Boye and Johnson each received placement on the All-American teams.

===== 2007 national championship =====
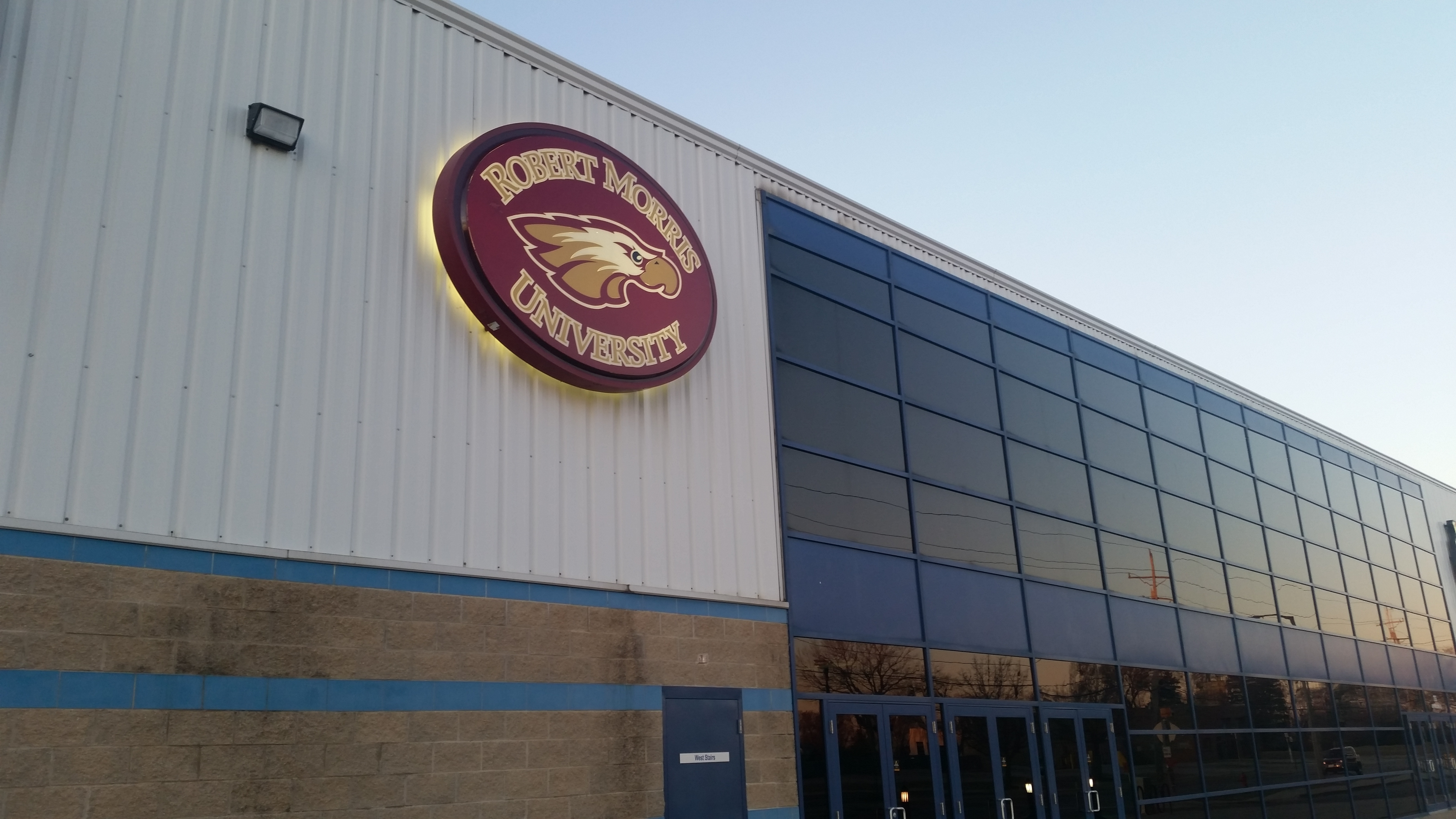
Edge Ice Arena, RMU and Roosevelt's home since the 2006–07 season

The 2005 national title game would prove to be an anomaly in terms of opponent, as each of the next four ACHA finals would feature Robert Morris-Lindenwood matchups. The Lions shut down RMC's repeat bid in 2006 with a 3–2 overtime win, but the Eagles recaptured the top spot in the rankings the following season with a late-season home sweep of LU. That flip gave Robert Morris the top seed for the 2007 national championships in Amherst, Massachusetts, where the Eagles promptly dispatched of Michigan and hosting Massachusetts in the pool round by a combined 12–1 count, thanks in part to Jessica Zalesky's three goals.

Things became much tighter from there, starting with a 3–1 quarterfinal win over Norwich on March 9, 2007. Thanks to an early Sophie LeClerc goal, the Cadets (who were competing in their final ACHA season before heading to NCAA Division III) held a 1–0 lead until late in the second period. RMC finally got going from that point, tying the game through freshman standout Bridget Katz, then adding third period tallies by Varner and Kosobucki for the final margin. The semifinal contest, against a Connecticut team that had upset always powerful Michigan State in the quarterfinals, offered even more drama. Varner's interception-to-backhand goal put RMC up 1–0 in the second, and her assist of Katz with six minutes left in the third period gave the Eagles a 2–1 lead. However, the Huskies grabbed a 5-on-3 goal in the last minute of regulation to force overtime, and an Eagles penalty immediately after the goal put UConn right back on a 5-on-3, with a chance to end things. Zace stood tall on the opening rush of overtime, and Varner subsequently boosted her squad to the finals with a shorthanded goal that, as with her first goal of the game, was a solo effort beginning with a turnover near the Huskies line.

The championship rematch against Lindenwood was a bit less tense. Jackie Holmes and Ashley Ackerman gave the Eagles a 2–0 lead, and although Katie Kells made it 2–1 in the second period, Zace made a key save on eventual two-time ACHA player of the year Kat Hannah to keep RMC ahead. Katz scored shortly after that to restore the two-goal advantage, and Tricia Cain added a late clincher on the power play.

Varner was named the most valuable player of the tournament, completing a rare double MVP season following up her Zoë M. Harris Award win. Zace captured first team All-American honors for the second year in a row, and she was joined on the top All-American tier by Kosobucki and Dana Paha.

==== Weaver era and continued success (2008–14) ====
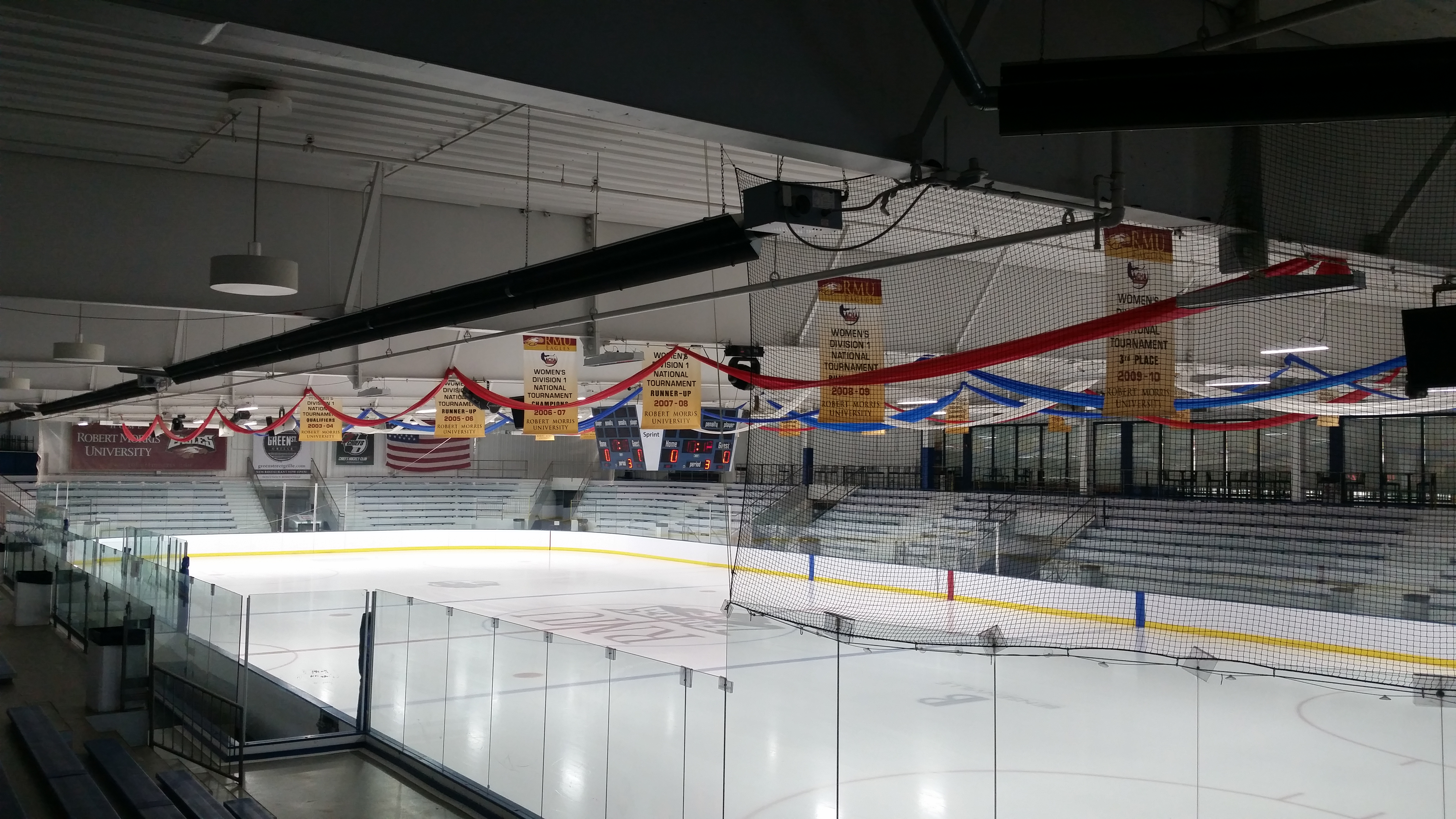
The main rink at Edge Ice Arena includes the Eagles' collection of championship banners

Robert Morris endured its first significant era change in 2008, as the 2004 entering class that formed much of the core responsible for the 2005 and 2007 national championships graduated (or already had, in the case of transfer players). Furthermore, Burke departed midway through the 2008–09 campaign after five-and-a-half seasons behind the Eagles bench. He was replaced on an interim basis by long-time assistant Chris Chelios (no relation to the Hockey Hall of Fame player) for the remainder of 2008–09, before Tom Robertson became the permanent replacement.

If those disruptions hurt the team, it wasn't immediately apparent. The Eagles brought in a loaded recruiting class in 2008, headlined by Alaska native Ramey Weaver, North Dakota's Cassie Beckerleg and Californian Rachel Black. Those freshmen combined with underclass stars like Danielle McCutcheon and Hope Fullum to drive the program for the next few years. Despite the heavy graduations and coaching uncertainty, RMU maintained its position near the top of the ACHA during 2008–09 and 2009–10, never falling below fifth in the rankings, and making its fifth and sixth consecutive trips to the national tournament semifinals. Both seasons ended in loss, however, first with one more title game loss to Lindenwood, then with a narrow semifinal defeat to Michigan State.

In 2010, Robert Morris joined the Central Collegiate Women's Hockey Association, ending the program's run as an independent team. With its CCWHA membership, RMU once again found itself competing for trophies with Lindenwood (which had joined the conference in 2007), although the reunion was short-lived, as the Lions left the CCWHA and the ACHA for College Hockey America and NCAA Division I after 2010–11, the Eagles' first season in the league.

During the 2010–11 season, the Eagles added 5-11 Alberta native Mandy Dion - a Lindenwood transfer - that year, and Dion posted 79 goals and 122 points, both single-season RMU records (Dion, in fact, ranks sixth in Robert Morris career scoring, despite only spending one season as a player in Chicago). McCutcheon was just behind Dion with 120 points, and would capture the Zoë M. Harris Award that season, while Weaver added 93 points as the Eagles battered most of the competition in their new league, finishing second to Lindenwood during the regular season and losing only to the Lions within the CCWHA. However, in the postseason, LU defeated RMU in the conference semifinals and the Eagles failed to escape the pool round at nationals for the first time since their inaugural 2003–04 season, after losses to eventual national champion Michigan State and an ascendant Northeastern team that would go on to win the title in 2011–12.

Robert Morris found its greatest CCWHA success in 2011–12 and 2012–13 under head coach Bud Hickey, winning the league regular season championship in both seasons (with a combined CCWHA record of 29–1–4), as well as the playoff title in 2011–12, with the playoff championship largely due to the play of Staci Pomering. Pomering, a goaltender who transferred from NCAA Division III's University of Wisconsin–Stevens Point, allowed just two goals across five games against Michigan (twice), Grand Valley State, Western Michigan, and Ohio State to win tournament MVP honors. That success vaulted RMU to the top spot in the polls heading into nationals for the first time since the 2006–07 championship season, but a 1–0 semifinal loss to Minnesota on a goal in the last three minutes of regulation stalled the quest for a third national title. The Eagles were still represented well during 2011–12 awards season, however, with Weaver's 67-point campaign good enough for RMU's second straight Zoë M. Harris Award - and fourth overall, surpassing Lindenwood for the most all-time. Hickey, in his first season with the Eagles women after three with RMU's ACHA Men's Division 2 squad, was the ACHA's coach of the year, thanks largely to the team's return to prominence after the hard-to-swallow ending of 2010–11.

RMU's CCWHA tournament title defense failed in 2012–13 when Maria Barlow and Michigan State shut the Eagles out 1–0 in the championship game, while Liberty ended Robert Morris' ACHA title hopes in the semifinal round for the third time in four years thanks to Carrie Jickling's goal to win in double overtime.

The 2013–14 campaign started with a jolt as the Eagles ended up with two top players not with the team during the previous season. The first was Weaver, who had originally graduated in 2012 but returned after a year off to complete her eligibility. The other was Hayley Williams. Williams had been an NCAA Division I player at Bemidji State in 2009–10 but left the team and the sport after that season, attending the school for two more years before returning home to the Chicago area. She then volunteered to help out at Chicago Steel home games, and the USHL franchise sharing Edge Ice Arena with RMU at the time facilitated a chance meeting with a former teammate that ended with Williams resurrecting her career with the Eagles. Weaver and Williams were generally considered 2013–14's headliners (both were first team All-Americans and first team All-CCWHA selections, with Williams capturing RMU's record-extending fifth Zoë M. Harris Award), but heavy contributions from players like Chelsea Kasprick, Jessica Merritt and Madi Biluk once again made Robert Morris one of the ACHA's most explosive teams.

On February 8, 2014, Robert Morris defeated Grand Valley State 4–2, in an outdoor contest as part of a multi-game event dubbed the Winter Frost Faceoff and held at MB Financial Plaza (now Parkway Bank Park) in nearby Rosemont, Illinois.

The Eagles spent the entire season ranked third or fourth in the polls, and finished second in the CCWHA standings, behind a Miami team at the beginning of their own dynasty (the RedHawks would win their first national championship that season to begin a stretch of three in four years). However, things fizzled out quickly in the postseason: Michigan State and Michigan teams fighting for national tournament bids beat and tied RMU in the pool round at the CCWHA playoffs to prevent the Eagles from advancing to the semifinals, while an overtime loss to Adrian and a tie with Liberty delivered the same fate at nationals.

==== Final RMU seasons (2014–20) ====
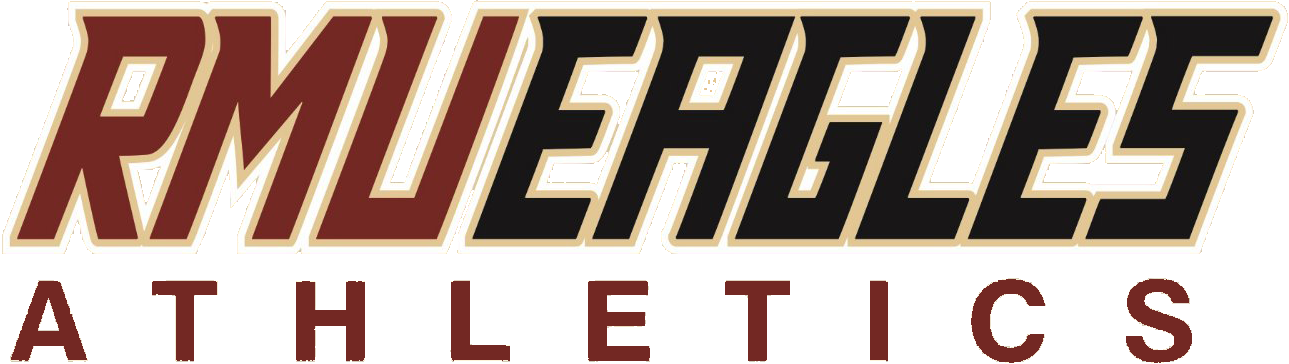
Wordmark of the Robert Morris Eagles

Following the challenging 2014 season, RMU entered a transitional period both on the ice and on the bench. After the Eagles missed the ACHA National Tournament for the first time in program history in 2014–15, Chelios (then in a second brief stint as the team's head coach) was let go, cutting a line of continuity to the program's early days. Jennifer Wilson was then hired as Chelios' replacement. Wilson was an accomplished player, including skating for the 2005–06 ECAC East championship team at Manhattanville College before playing two seasons at RMU, where she posted 49 points from 2012 to 2014, and she had also spent time as an assistant coach with Saint Michael's College's NCAA program.

Wilson began rebuilding the team with a 2015 entering class that included standout defenseman Alex Nurse, cornerstone forwards Bria Berggren, Grace Dynek, and Madison Schultz, as well as a few star transfers like Allyson Zachwieja (Marian University) and Rebecca Dilley (Bethel University). That group joined a solid existing core including then-rising-sophomore Makaila Anderson, who would go on to be the number eight scorer in program history, as of the end of 2017–18. Rachel Arias and Emily Urban would add offensive punch among the 2016 entries.

The 2015–16 season proceeded with highs and lows typical of a young team, with highs including upsets of Michigan and Grand Valley State that boosted the Eagles to tenth in the rankings late in the season, in position to aim for a national tournament bid. The win over the Lakers was particularly noteworthy, as Dynek scored the winning goal on a 3-on-0 rush with just five seconds remaining, and GVSU wound up as the national runners-up that year. The season quickly crashed from there though - RMU not only missed nationals, but also missed the CCWHA playoffs for the first time since joining the conference, as the Eagles were edged by a single point by Davenport for the sixth and final spot. The following year saw measurable progress, as Robert Morris not only returned to the playoffs, but also upset Michigan to advance to the conference semifinals for the first time since 2013. Dynek, Berggren, Zachwieja, and Anderson all scored in the victory over the Wolverines.

Wilson left for the head coach job with NCAA Division III program Buffalo State after 2016–17, and she was replaced by Sonja Novak. Novak also came highly regarded in the hockey world, thanks largely to her time as a player with Princeton University and the Czech Republic women's national ice hockey team, helping the latter to win consecutive division promotions at the 2011 IIHF Women's World Championship and 2012 IIHF Women's World Championship (including seven points in five games during the 2012 tournament). Although Novak's first season was derailed late by a slew of injuries, RMU still qualified for the CCWHA playoffs for the second consecutive year. On November 10, 2017, at its hosted ACHA showcase, the Eagles toppled fifth-ranked UMass 3–2. After trailing 2–1 into the last six minutes of the contest, Katie Merrell tied things up on the power play, then Urban capped the dramatic victory with just 33 seconds remaining. Exactly one week later, Laura Noble delivered a 34-save shutout of Michigan, supported by goals from Nurse and Abby Cardew.

However, Novak departed after a single season to join Wilson's staff, after the latter had left Buffalo State for Lake Forest College. Mason Strom, notable as the leader of the successful program at Fenwick High School, succeeded Novak as RMU's coach. The Eagles largely struggled through Strom's first two seasons though, finishing sixth in the CCWHA each time. Highlights of those campaigns included a 1–0 victory over eventual ACHA National Tournament participant McKendree on December 1, 2018, on the back of a Lauren Yomantas shutout, as well as a 2–1 victory over Davenport on February 23, 2020, thanks to Arias' winning goal with 3:44 remaining that allowed the Eagles to clinch the final spot in the CCWHA playoffs.

=== Roosevelt University (2020–present) ===
The team will begin play as the Roosevelt Lakers for the 2020–21 season, with Strom and associate head coach Carla Pentimone continuing in their roles.

== Season-by-season results ==
| Won Championship | Lost Championship | Regular Season Conference Champions |

=== Roosevelt ===
| Year | Coach | W | L | T | Conference | Conf. W | Conf. L | Conf. T | Finish | Conference Tournament | ACHA Tournament |
| 2020–21 | Mason Strom | – | – | – | CCWHA | – | – | – | – | – | – |

=== Robert Morris ===
| Year | Coach | W | L | T | Conference | Conf. W | Conf. L | Conf. T | Finish | Conference Tournament | ACHA Tournament |
| 2019–20 | Mason Strom | 6 | 26 | 0 | CCWHA | 4 | 10 | 0 | 6th | Lost First Round vs. Miami (2–7) | Did not qualify |
| 2018–19 | Mason Strom | 10 | 19 | 0 | CCWHA | 4 | 10 | 0 | 6th | Did not qualify | Did not qualify |
| 2017–18 | Sonja Novak | 9 | 17 | 0 | CCWHA | 5 | 9 | 0 | 5th | Lost First Round vs. Grand Valley State (3–6) | Did not qualify |
| 2016–17 | Jennifer Wilson | 15 | 15 | 1 | CCWHA | 6 | 8 | 0 | 5th | Won First Round vs. Michigan (4–1); Lost Semifinals vs. Miami (4–5) | Did not qualify |
| 2015–16 | Jennifer Wilson | 11 | 13 | 2 | CCWHA | 4 | 8 | 2 | 7th | Did not qualify | Did not qualify |
| 2014–15 | Chris Chelios | 15 | 17 | 2 | CCWHA | 4 | 8 | 2 | 6th | Lost First Round vs. Adrian (1–2); Lost Elimination Game vs. Michigan State (2–5) | Did not qualify |
| 2013–14 | Chris Chelios | 24 | 7 | 6 | CCWHA | 14 | 2 | 2 | 2nd | Won Pool Round vs. Davenport (9–3); Lost Pool Round vs. Michigan State (1–4); Tied Pool Round vs. Michigan (4–4 OT) | Lost Pool Round vs. Adrian (2–3 OT); Tied Pool Round vs. Liberty (4–4 OT); Won Pool Round vs. Massachusetts (6–4) |
| 2012–13 | Bud Hickey | 28 | 9 | 2 | CCWHA | 18 | 0 | 2 | 1st | Lost Pool Round vs. Michigan State (0–3); Won Pool Round vs. Adrian (3–1); Won Pool Round vs. Northern Michigan (9–0); Won Semifinals vs. Grand Valley State (1–0 OT); Lost Championship vs. Michigan State (0–1) | Won Pool Round vs. Northeastern (2–1); Won Pool Round vs. Michigan State (5–1); Lost Pool Round vs. Massachusetts (1–2); Lost Semifinals vs. Liberty (1–2 2OT); Won Third Place vs. Massachusetts (7–2) |
| 2011–12 | Bud Hickey | 27 | 14 | 3 | CCWHA | 11 | 1 | 2 | 1st | Won Pool Round vs. Grand Valley State (3–0); Won Pool Round vs. Western Michigan (8–1); Won Pool Round vs. Michigan (2–0); Won Semifinals vs. Ohio State (4–1); Won Championship vs. Michigan (3–0) | Tied Pool Round vs. Massachusetts (4–4 OT); Won Pool Round vs. Michigan (5–0); Won Pool Round vs. Rhode Island (2–0); Lost Semifinals vs. Minnesota (0–1); Won Third Place vs. Massachusetts (5–1) |
| 2010–11 | Tom Robertson | 28 | 12 | 1 | CCWHA | 12 | 2 | 0 | 2nd | Tied Pool Round vs. Michigan (3–3 OT); Won Pool Round vs. Western Michigan (8–1); Lost Semifinals vs. Lindenwood (2–3) | Won Pool Round vs. Massachusetts (9–1); Lost Pool Round vs. Michigan State (0–4); Lost Pool Round vs. Northeastern (2–3) |
| 2009–10 | Tom Robertson | 28 | 14 | 5 | Independent | – | – | – | – | None | Won Pool Round vs. Penn State (3–0); Won Pool Round vs. Liberty (3–2); Won Pool Round vs. Rhode Island (4–3); Lost Semifinals vs. Michigan State (1–2); Won Third Place vs. Rhode Island (3–1) |
| 2008–09 | John Burke; Chris Chelios | 22 | 16 | 2 | Independent | – | – | – | – | None | Won Pool Round vs. Massachusetts (5–2); Won Pool Round vs. Wisconsin (6–0); Won Quarterfinals vs. Michigan (2–0); Won Semifinals vs. Michigan State (3–0); Lost Championship vs. Lindenwood (1–2) |
| 2007–08 | John Burke | 28 | 14 | 0 | Independent | – | – | – | – | None | Won Pool Round vs. Minnesota (6–0); Won Pool Round vs. Western Michigan (6–1); Won Quarterfinals vs. Michigan (4–1); Won Semifinals vs. Rhode Island (3–1); Lost Championship vs. Lindenwood (1–2) |
| 2006–07 | John Burke | 30 | 12 | 2 | Independent | – | – | – | – | None | Won Pool Round vs. Michigan (6–1); Won Pool Round vs. Massachusetts (6–0); Won Quarterfinals vs. Norwich (3–1); Won Semifinals vs. Connecticut (3–2 OT); Won Championship vs. Lindenwood (4–1) |
| 2005–06 | John Burke | 31 | 10 | 2 | Independent | – | – | – | – | None | Won Pool Round vs. Michigan (8–1); Won Pool Round vs. Maryland (13–0); Won Quarterfinals vs. Connecticut (6–3); Won Semifinals vs. Rhode Island (3–2); Lost Championship vs. Lindenwood (2–3 OT) |
| 2004–05 | John Burke | 37 | 7 | 1 | Independent | – | – | – | – | None | Won Pool Round vs. Buffalo (8–0); Won Pool Round vs. North Country CC (7–2); Won Quarterfinals vs. Western Michigan (9–3); Won Semifinals vs. Rhode Island (4–0); Won Championship vs. Michigan State (7–1) |
| 2003–04 | John Burke | 31 | 7 | 6 | Independent | – | – | – | – | None | Lost Pool Round vs. Colorado (3–4); Won Pool Round vs. Pennsylvania (12–0); Tied Consolation vs. Penn State (3–3 OT) |

== ACHA National Tournament results ==
The program has appeared in the ACHA National Tournament 11 times, all while known as Robert Morris. The Eagles won national championships in 2005 and 2007, and had additional top-four finishes in 2006, 2008, 2009, 2010, 2012 and 2013. Their combined record in all games is 35–11–3.

| Year | Location | Seed | Round | Opponent | Results |
| 2004 | East Lansing, Michigan | #1 | Pool Round; Pool Round; Consolation | #8 Colorado #12 Pennsylvania #11 Penn State | L 3–4; W 12–0; T 3–3 OT |
| 2005 | Amherst, New York | #1 | Pool Round; Pool Round; Quarterfinals; Semifinals; Championship | #12 Buffalo #8 North Country CC #5 Western Michigan #4 Rhode Island #3 Michigan State | W 8–0; W 7–2; W 9–3; W 4–0; W 7–1 |
| 2006 | Wentzville, Missouri | #1 | Pool Round; Pool Round; Quarterfinals; Semifinals; Championship | #8 Michigan #12 Maryland #5 Connecticut #4 Rhode Island #2 Lindenwood | W 8–1; W 13–0; W 6–3; W 3–2; L 2–3 OT |
| 2007 | Amherst, Massachusetts | #1 | Pool Round; Pool Round; Quarterfinals; Semifinals; Championship | #8 Michigan #12 Massachusetts #9 Norwich #7 Connecticut #2 Lindenwood | W 6–1; W 6–0; W 3–1; W 3–2 OT; W 4–1 |
| 2008 | Bensenville, Illinois | #3 | Pool Round; Pool Round; Quarterfinals; Semifinals; Championship | #7 Minnesota #11 Western Michigan #8 Michigan #2 Rhode Island #1 Lindenwood | W 6–0; W 6–1; W 4–1; W 3–1; L 1–2 |
| 2009 | Rochester, New York | #5 | Pool Round; Pool Round; Quarterfinals; Semifinals; Championship | #4 Massachusetts #9 Wisconsin #8 Michigan #2 Michigan State #1 Lindenwood | W 5–2; W 6–0; W 2–0; W 3–0; L 1–2 |
| 2010 | Blaine, Minnesota | #2 | Pool Round; Pool Round; Pool Round; Semifinals; Third Place | #7 Penn State #5 Liberty #3 Rhode Island #6 Michigan State #3 Rhode Island | W 3–0; W 3–2; W 4–3; L 1–2; W 3–1 |
| 2011 | Kalamazoo, Michigan | #2 | Pool Round; Pool Round; Pool Round | #7 Massachusetts #5 Michigan State #4 Northeastern | W 9–1; L 0–4; L 2–3 |
| 2012 | Wooster, Ohio | #1 | Pool Round; Pool Round; Pool Round; Semifinals; Third-Place Game | #8 Massachusetts #6 Michigan #3 Rhode Island #4 Minnesota #8 Massachusetts | T 4–4 OT; W 5–0; W 2–0; L 0–1; W 5–1 |
| 2013 | Ashburn, Virginia | #4 | Pool Round; Pool Round; Pool Round; Semifinals; Third-Place Game | #5 Northeastern #7 Michigan State #2 Massachusetts #1 Liberty #2 Massachusetts | W 2–1; W 5–1; L 1–2; L 1–2 2OT; W 7–2 |
| 2014 | Newark, Delaware | #4 | Pool Round; Pool Round; Pool Round | #5 Adrian #7 Liberty #2 Massachusetts | L 2–3 OT; T 4–4 OT; W 6–4 |

== Program records ==
As of May 15, 2020. ACHA games only, including both the Roosevelt and Robert Morris eras.

=== Career scoring leaders ===
| Name | Years | Games | Goals | Assists | Points |
| Ramey Weaver | 2008–12, 13–14 | 164 | 137 | 155 | 292 |
| Savannah Varner | 2004–08 | 88 | 138 | 89 | 227 |
| Danielle McCutcheon | 2007–11 | 122 | 108 | 113 | 221 |
| Bridget Katz | 2006–10 | 113 | 89 | 68 | 157 |
| Makaila Anderson | 2014–19 | 145 | 95 | 54 | 149 |
| Cassie Beckerleg | 2008–12 | 130 | 49 | 85 | 134 |
| Mandy Dion | 2010–11 | 35 | 79 | 43 | 122 |
| Becky Geerts | 2010–15 | 176 | 49 | 71 | 120 |
| Hope Fullum | 2007–11 | 120 | 37 | 69 | 106 |
| Jessica Merritt | 2011–14 | 111 | 36 | 66 | 102 |
| Chelsea Kasprick | 2012–14 | 72 | 65 | 34 | 99 |
| Lucia Plyer | 2011–15 | 133 | 42 | 54 | 96 |
| Becky Katz | 2009–14 | 179 | 28 | 65 | 93 |
| Leah Johnson | 2003–05 | 55 | 53 | 39 | 92 |
| Ashley Boye | 2004–06 | 40 | 46 | 43 | 89 |
| Katie Kosobucki | 2004–08 | 91 | 40 | 48 | 88 |
| Jordyn Tremain | 2011–15 | 144 | 32 | 52 | 84 |
| Emily Urban | 2016–present | 116 | 32 | 52 | 84 |
| Rachel Black | 2008–13 | 153 | 16 | 64 | 80 |
| Bria Berggren | 2015–19 | 107 | 25 | 49 | 74 |
| Hayley Williams | 2013–14 | 35 | 34 | 39 | 73 |
| Madi Biluk | 2012–14 | 70 | 33 | 38 | 71 |
| Lisa Gens | 2003–07 | 94 | 19 | 52 | 71 |
| Allyson Zachwieja | 2015–17 | 57 | 34 | 36 | 70 |
| Mindy Shelton | 2003–06 | 73 | 34 | 31 | 65 |
| Madison Schultz | 2015–19 | 107 | 35 | 29 | 64 |
| Marianne McLaughlin | 2010–14 | 123 | 13 | 49 | 62 |
| Nicole Flanagan | 2003–06 | 74 | 19 | 32 | 51 |
| Jessica Zalesky | 2004–09 | 114 | 23 | 27 | 50 |
| Grace Dynek | 2015–17 | 51 | 29 | 20 | 49 |
| Jennifer Wilson | 2012–14 | 68 | 22 | 27 | 49 |
| Kayla McCaig | 2008–13 | 170 | 20 | 29 | 49 |

=== Single season scoring leaders ===
| Name | Year | Games | Goals | Assists | Points |
| Mandy Dion | 2010–11 | 35 | 79 | 43 | 122 |
| Danielle McCutcheon | 2010–11 | 37 | 43 | 77 | 120 |
| Ramey Weaver | 2010–11 | 31 | 40 | 53 | 93 |
| Hayley Williams | 2013–14 | 35 | 34 | 39 | 73 |
| Savannah Varner | 2004–05 | 19 | 48 | 19 | 67 |
| Ramey Weaver | 2011–12 | 38 | 37 | 30 | 67 |
| Savannah Varner | 2006–07 | 21 | 35 | 29 | 64 |
| Ramey Weaver | 2009–10 | 39 | 23 | 40 | 63 |
| Bridget Katz | 2009–10 | 38 | 43 | 19 | 62 |
| Ramey Weaver | 2013–14 | 36 | 32 | 23 | 55 |
| Savannah Varner | 2005–06 | 20 | 30 | 22 | 52 |
| Chelsea Kasprick | 2012–13 | 34 | 32 | 18 | 50 |
| Chelsea Kasprick | 2013–14 | 38 | 33 | 16 | 49 |
| Cassie Beckerleg | 2011–12 | 38 | 24 | 25 | 49 |
| Leah Johnson | 2003–04 | 35 | 29 | 17 | 46 |
| Leah Johnson | 2004–05 | 20 | 24 | 22 | 46 |
| Cassie Beckerleg | 2010–11 | 37 | 13 | 33 | 46 |
| Ashley Boye | 2005–06 | 20 | 19 | 26 | 45 |
| Ashley Boye | 2004–05 | 20 | 27 | 17 | 44 |
| Danielle McCutcheon | 2009–10 | 39 | 29 | 14 | 43 |
| Mindy Shelton | 2003–04 | 35 | 22 | 21 | 43 |
| Becky Geerts | 2010–11 | 35 | 10 | 32 | 42 |
| Bridget Katz | 2006–07 | 21 | 21 | 20 | 41 |
| Katie Kosobucki | 2006–07 | 21 | 19 | 22 | 41 |
| Makaila Anderson | 2014–15 | 33 | 28 | 12 | 40 |
| Hope Fullum | 2010–11 | 37 | 16 | 24 | 40 |

=== Notable goaltenders ===
| Name | Years | Minutes | Saves | Save Pct. | GAA | Shutouts |
| Anna Salvaggio | 2010–15 | 4247.77 | 1387 | 0.889 | 2.46 | 7 |
| Staci Pomering | 2011–13 | 3753.03 | 1553 | 0.955 | 1.18 | 23 |
| Laura Noble | 2010–11, 12–13, 14–16, 17–18 | 3473.47 | 1420 | 0.888 | 3.11 | 5 |
| Kendra Gallaher | 2015–18 | 2276.45 | 949 | 0.897 | 2.87 | 4 |
| Annette Scislowicz | 2018–present | 2240.68 | 1025 | 0.873 | 3.99 | 5 |
| Lauren Yomantas | 2016–19 | 1982.30 | 789 | 0.883 | 3.18 | 3 |
| Ashley Miller | 2009–10^{†} | 1508.20 | 485 | 0.920 | 1.67 | 4 |
| Lori Barton | 2003–06 | 1423.00 | 428 | 0.934 | 1.26 | 16 |
| Crystal Zace | 2004–06^{†} | 1095.00 | 281 | 0.924 | 1.26 | 3 |
| Amy Murray | 2013–14 | 872.47 | 198 | 0.850 | 2.41 | 1 |
| Jade Getz | 2009–10^{†} | 689.13 | 280 | 0.927 | 1.92 | 1 |
| Madison Laue | 2019–present | 621.80 | 411 | 0.863 | 6.27 | 0 |

† Career includes games during the 2006–07, 2007–08 and/or 2008–09 seasons, during which the ACHA did not accurately track goaltending statistics. Ashley Miller played from 2006–10, Crystal Zace played from 2004–07, and Jade Getz played from 2007–10.

== ACHA ranking history ==
=== National rankings ===
The ACHA began compiling a national ranking in 2003–04, issued four times per season, with the top twelve (from 2003–04 through 2008–09) or eight (from 2009–10 on) in the final regular season ranking, released in February, receiving a bid to the ACHA National Tournament. A preseason ranking was initiated beginning with 2014–15. Beginning with the 2016–17 season, the ACHA tabulated rankings each week during the season and issued them on Tuesdays following weekends including games. The ranking methodology initially used a combined human voter and computer ranking process before moving exclusively to a computer ranking for the 2018–19 season, a development that eliminated the preseason ranking.

| Year | Ranking | | | | | | | | | | | | | | | | | |
| Year | Pre | 1 | 2 | 3 | 4 | 5 | 6 | 7 | 8 | 9 | 10 | 11 | 12 | 13 | 14 | 15 | 16 | 17 |
|---|---|---|---|---|---|---|---|---|---|---|---|---|---|---|---|---|---|---|
| 2003–04 | | 3 | 3 | 1 | 1 | | | | | | | | | | | | | |
| 2004–05 | | 1 | 1 | 1 | 1 | | | | | | | | | | | | | |
| 2005–06 | | 1 | 1 | 1 | 1 | | | | | | | | | | | | | |
| 2006–07 | | 2 | 2 | 2 | 1 | | | | | | | | | | | | | |
| 2007–08 | | 1 | 1 | 3 | 3 | | | | | | | | | | | | | |
| 2008–09 | | 3 | 5 | 5 | 5 | | | | | | | | | | | | | |
| 2009–10 | | 2 | 2 | 2 | 2 | | | | | | | | | | | | | |
| 2010–11 | | 6 | 4 | 2 | 2 | | | | | | | | | | | | | |
| 2011–12 | | 2 | 3 | 3 | 1 | | | | | | | | | | | | | |
| 2012–13 | | 2 | 4 | 4 | 4 | | | | | | | | | | | | | |
| 2013–14 | | 3 | 4 | 4 | 4 | | | | | | | | | | | | | |
| 2014–15 | 9 | 10 | 12 | 12 | 13 | | | | | | | | | | | | | |
| 2015–16 | 12 | 13 | 11 | 10 | 12 | | | | | | | | | | | | | |
| 2016–17 | 13 | 12 | 14 | 15 | 14 | 13 | 13 | 12 | 13 | 11 | 12 | 13 | 12 | 13 | 12 | 12 | 12 | 12 |
| 2017–18 | 12 | 14 | 14 | 13 | 13 | 14 | 13 | 13 | 14 | 14 | 14 | 14 | 14 | 14 | 14 | 14 | 14 | |
| 2018–19 | | 9 | 13 | – | 15 | 15 | 14 | 14 | 14 | 14 | 14 | 14 | 14 | 13 | 13 | | | |
| 2019–20 | | 15 | – | – | – | – | – | – | 15 | – | – | – | – | | | | | |

=== Regional rankings ===
From 2000–01 through 2002–03, prior to the establishment of Robert Morris' program, regional rankings were the sole method for determining ACHA National Tournament bids. The inaugural 2000–01 season featured teams divided into East and West Regions, with the top four from each in February's final ranking invited to nationals. For 2001–02 and 2002–03, the setup was expanded to include East, Central and West Regions. Under that system, the top two from each region were invited to nationals, along with two wild card teams. In 2003–04, RMU's inaugural year, the tournament field was expanded to 12 teams, and a national ranking was introduced. The latter development diminished the importance of the regional rankings, as the national rankings were used to determine nationals bids. Regional champions were still awarded an autobid, however, even if ranked outside of the top 12 nationally. In 2004–05, growth in the number of ACHA women's teams resulted in an increase to four regions - Northeast, Southeast, Central and West - although things reverted to East, Central and West in 2007–08. The 2009–10 season was notable both for the fact that the tournament field was reduced back to eight teams and as the final year of the regional system, which had become largely antiquated as regional champions generally had little issue placing highly in the national rankings. Robert Morris was included in the Central Region for the duration of its existence within the regional ranking system.

| Year | Ranking | | | | |
| Year | 1 | 2 | 3 | 4 | 5 |
|---|---|---|---|---|---|
| 2000–01 | Not an ACHA member | | | | |
| 2001–02 | Not an ACHA member | | | | |
| 2002–03 | Not an ACHA member | | | | |
| 2003–04 | 1C | 2C | 1C | 1C | |
| 2004–05 | 1C | 1C | 1C | 1C | |
| 2005–06 | 1C | 1C | 1C | 1C | |
| 2006–07 | 1C | 1C | 1C | 1C | |
| 2007–08 | 1C | 1C | 1C | 1C | |
| 2008–09 | 1C | 2C | 2C | 2C | |
| 2009–10 | 1C | 1C | 1C | | |

== ACHA national honors ==
=== Annual awards ===
All-Americans and All-Tournament selections including all seasons except 2008–09. Academic All-Americans including all seasons except 2007–08, 2008–09 and 2015–16.

Zoë M. Harris Player of the Year

- Krista Sleen - 2004–05
- Savannah Varner - 2006–07
- Danielle McCutcheon - 2010–11
- Ramey Weaver - 2011–12
- Hayley Williams - 2013–14

Coach of the Year

- Bud Hickey - 2011–12

Community Playmaker Award

- Hope Fullum - 2009–10

Academic All-American

- Nicole Flanagan - 2005–06
- Katie Kosobucki - 2005–06, 2006–07
- Dana Paha - 2005–06
- Amanda Perry - 2005–06
- Mindy Shelton - 2005–06
- Crystal Zace - 2006–07
- Jade Getz - 2009–10
- Bridget Katz - 2009–10
- Cassie Beckerleg - 2010–11
- Kayla McCaig - 2010–11, 2011–12
- Danielle McCutcheon - 2010–11
- Ramey Weaver - 2010–11, 2011–12
- Staci Pomering - 2011–12
- Makaila Anderson - 2016–17, 2017–18
- Rebecca Dilley - 2016–17
- Mikayla Driscoll - 2016–17
- Allyson Zachwieja - 2016–17
- Kendra Gallaher - 2017–18
- Madison Schultz - 2017–18, 2018–19
- Caroline Snyder - 2017–18, 2018–19
- Lauren Yomantas - 2017–18
- Cassidy Schukat - 2018–19, 2019–20
- Abby Cardew - 2019–20
- Valerie Whalen - 2019–20

First Team All-American

- Leah Johnson - 2003–04
- Savannah Varner - 2004–05, 2005–06
- Ashley Boye - 2005–06
- Jennifer Norris - 2005–06
- Crystal Zace - 2005–06, 2006–07
- Katie Kosobucki - 2006–07
- Dana Paha - 2006–07
- Hope Fullum - 2007–08
- Cassie Beckerleg - 2009–10, 2010–11, 2011–12
- Bridget Katz - 2009–10
- Ramey Weaver - 2010–11, 2013–14
- Staci Pomering - 2011–12
- Becky Katz - 2012–13
- Hayley Williams - 2013–14

Second Team All-American

- Krista Sleen - 2003–04
- Leah Johnson - 2004–05
- Savannah Varner - 2007–08
- Ramey Weaver - 2009–10
- Rachel Black - 2011–12
- Jessica Merritt - 2012–13
- Staci Pomering - 2012–13
- Kasey Powers - 2012–13

All-American Honorable Mention

- Ashley Boye - 2004–05
- Katie Kosobucki - 2007–08
- Danielle McCutcheon - 2007–08

National Tournament MVP

- Leah Johnson - 2004–05
- Savannah Varner - 2006–07

First Team All-Tournament

- Leah Johnson - 2003–04
- Savannah Varner - 2004–05, 2005–06, 2007–08
- Ashley Boye - 2005–06
- Bridget Katz - 2006–07
- Dana Paha - 2006–07
- Hope Fullum - 2007–08
- Ramey Weaver - 2009–10
- Cassie Beckerleg - 2011–12
- Staci Pomering - 2011–12
- Hayley Williams - 2013–14

Second Team All-Tournament

- Ashley Boye - 2004–05
- Jennifer Norris - 2005–06
- Crystal Zace - 2005–06
- Jessica Zalesky - 2006–07
- Cassie Beckerleg - 2009–10
- Danielle McCutcheon - 2009–10, 2010–11
- Ramey Weaver - 2011–12
- Chelsea Kasprick - 2012–13
- Staci Pomering - 2012–13
- Kasey Powers - 2012–13

All-Tournament Honorable Mention

- Katie Johnson - 2003–04
- Krista Sleen - 2003–04, 2004–05
- Lisa Gens - 2005–06
- Dana Paha - 2005–06
- Allison Toft - 2005–06
- Katie Kosobucki - 2006–07, 2007–08
- Ashley Miller - 2006–07
- Danielle McCutcheon - 2007–08

=== Monthly awards ===
During the 2013–14, 2014–15 and 2015–16 seasons, the ACHA presented a series of monthly awards for both men's and women's divisions.

Harrow Player of the Month

- Chelsea Kasprick - December 2013

Harrow Defenseman of the Month

- Brianne Hanson - January 2015

Turfer Sportsmanship Award

- Chelsea Kasprick - December 2013

== Conference honors ==
All-Conference selections including all seasons except 2010–11, 2011–12 and 2012–13. All-Tournament selections including all seasons except 2010–11.

CCWHA Tournament MVP

- Staci Pomering - 2011–12

First Team All-CCWHA

- Ramey Weaver - 2013–14
- Hayley Williams - 2013–14

Second Team All-CCWHA

- Makaila Anderson - 2014–15, 2015–16
- Allyson Zachwieja - 2016–17
- Alex Nurse - 2018–19

First Team All-CCWHA Tournament

- Becky Katz - 2011–12
- Staci Pomering - 2011–12
- Ramey Weaver - 2011–12, 2013–14
- Hayley Williams - 2013–14
- Rebecca Dilley - 2016–17
- Allyson Zachwieja - 2016–17

Second Team All-CCWHA Tournament

- Chelsea Kasprick - 2012–13
- Kasey Powers - 2012–13
- Becky Geerts - 2014–15
- Lauren Yomantas - 2016–17

== Robert Morris Athletic Hall of Fame ==
Established in 2010, the RMU Athletic Hall of Fame honored former student-athletes across all sports for outstanding contributions to the Eagles. Notably, Crystal Zace became the first woman in the hall twice in 2012, when she received her individual induction following her inclusion as a member of the 2004–05 ACHA national championship team.

- 2004–05 Team - 2010
- Crystal Zace - 2012
- Savannah Varner - 2014

== World University Games selections ==
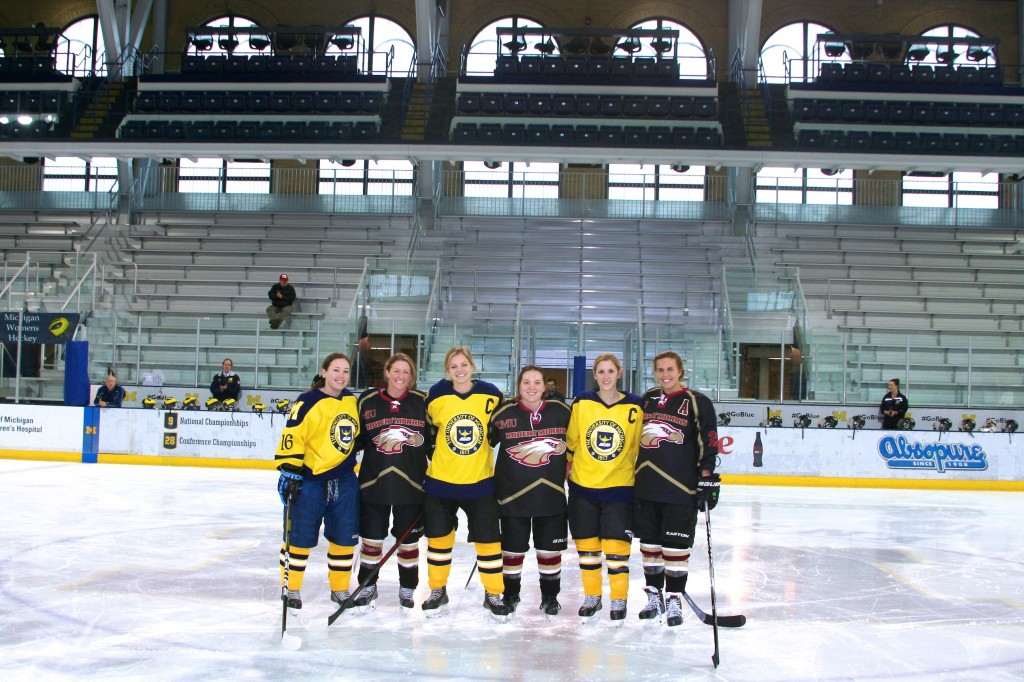
RMU players (in black, left to right) Hayley Williams, Ramey Weaver, and Jessica Merritt with three University of Michigan players, after the six had competed for Team USA at the 2013 World University Games

Since 2011, the ACHA has supplied players for the U.S. National University Select Women's Team, which competes at the World University Games women's hockey tournament, held biennially and as part of the multi-sport event for college and university student-athletes. Robert Morris had six players selected to Team USA, all for the 2011 and 2013 tournaments.

The 2011 squad, featuring Ramey Weaver, Becky Katz, and Rachel Black, finished fourth in Erzurum, Turkey by winning games against overmatched Great Britain and Turkey teams but losing to the more traditional hockey powers in Canada, Slovakia, and Finland. Even in defeat, a game against Finland during the round robin stage was likely Team USA's best moment of the tournament. In the contest, the Americans held a team featuring several members of the senior Finland women's national ice hockey team that had just won bronze medals at the 2010 Vancouver Olympics within a 3–1 score, including an empty-net goal (Venla Hovi and Annina Rajahuhta from that Finland team would go on to also win bronze medals at the 2018 Pyeongchang Olympics). Weaver had four points during the tournament to tie for fifth in team scoring.

Two years later, she was not only invited back to the team, but also named its captain, and was joined on the roster by Eagles Hayley Williams (who was an alternate captain) and Jessica Merritt. The trio helped Team USA to bronze medals in Trentino, Italy, a historic finish as a first medal for any American team in the modern era (USA Hockey resumed its participation in the WUG on the men's side in 2001 after a lengthy hiatus) and just the second overall, following the U.S. men in 1972 (who "earned" bronze medals by finishing third in a three-team tournament). Particularly, Weaver and Williams were among the team leaders, not only in terms of leadership roles, but also in offensive output - Weaver's eight points led all Americans, while Williams added five to rank fourth. Each contributed a point in the team's biggest win, a 4–2 victory over a Russia team featuring several Russia women's national ice hockey team members to open the tournament, while Williams (one goal, one assist) or Weaver (one assist) had a hand in every U.S. goal during a 3–1 bronze medal match win over Japan.

| Year | Location | Player | Result |
|---|---|---|---|
| 2011 | Erzurum, Turkey | (United States) Rachel Black | Fourth place |
| 2011 | Erzurum, Turkey | (United States) Becky Katz | Fourth place |
| 2011 | Erzurum, Turkey | (United States) Ramey Weaver | Fourth place |
| 2013 | Trentino, Italy | (United States) Jessica Merritt | Bronze Medal |
| 2013 | Trentino, Italy | (United States) Ramey Weaver | Bronze Medal |
| 2013 | Trentino, Italy | (United States) Hayley Williams | Bronze Medal |

=== 2010 ACHA women's select team ===
As a precursor to World University Games participation, the ACHA assembled a first-of-its-kind women's select team that toured Geneva, Switzerland, Chamonix, France and Méribel, France during April 2010. The team included Weaver, as well as Eagles goaltender Ashley Miller, as RMU player representatives. Its final record overseas was 2–2–0, including two close losses to the France women's national ice hockey team and two decisive wins over local club teams.

== Rivalries ==
=== Davenport ===
Although there's a fair amount of contrast between the histories of the two programs, given that Davenport only started its team in 2013–14 and has yet to qualify for the ACHA National Tournament, the Lakers and Panthers have nevertheless developed a healthy feud in a relatively short time, primarily while RU was still playing as the Robert Morris Eagles. DU (along with fellow Grand Rapids, Michigan-area schools Aquinas College and Grand Valley State University) is Roosevelt's closest CCWHA competitor, and the two teams have spent much of the last few seasons jockeying for league playoff position. In 2015–16, Davenport knocked RMU out of the league playoffs for the first time ever when the Panthers pulled off a late-season upset of then-No. 4 GVSU to edge the Eagles by one point in the standings. During the season series, RMU did win five of a possible eight points from Davenport, although crucially, DU forced overtime through a Lexie Boydston goal with 22 seconds remaining on November 7, 2015. While the Eagles did go on to take that game thanks to an Abbey Revelle winner, the Panthers' point earned with the overtime loss wound up being the difference between the teams in the standings.

The Eagles got the best of Davenport in that regard on other occasions. The 2014–15 regular season, for example, ended with Robert Morris as the last team in the CCWHA playoffs, one point ahead of the Panthers. This occurred in spite of the fact that DU won the only series between the teams that year - although RMU made up for that deficit with upset wins over Michigan State and Adrian. The Eagles similarly made the conference playoffs in both 2016–17 and 2017–18 while Davenport did not, although the margins were more comfortably in RMU's favor on those occasions. One of the biggest games in series history occurred on February 23, 2020, a contest that had been postponed from January 11 due to snow. The new date at the end of the regular season multiplied the drama though, as it turned out to effectively be a play-in game for the CCWHA playoffs with the winner taking the sixth and final seed and the loser seeing its season end. After Ali Sinnett and Amanda Ballestero traded goals over the first two periods, RMU's Rachel Arias propelled her team to a 2–1 win with 3:44 remaining.

The teams have met once in postseason play, with Robert Morris taking a 9–3 CCWHA playoff win on February 21, 2014. Ramey Weaver scored four times for RMU, including twice in the first 10:07 of the contest and sandwiching a Madi Biluk tally, as the Eagles ran out to an early 3–0 advantage and never looked back.

Through the end of the 2019–20 season, Roosevelt owns a 13–6–2 series advantage on the Panthers.

=== Michigan State ===
From independent national powers to CCWHA rivals, Robert Morris and Michigan State were frequently in each other's way over stakes both large and small, and both were among the ACHA's most storied programs with a pair of national championships apiece.

The first time the Eagles and Spartans met was also the most important: the 2005 national championship game, won by RMC in a 7–1 rout. Since then, however, the teams have faced off four additional times at nationals, all within a span of five years between 2009 and 2013. The first two of those, 2009 and 2010, occurred in the semifinal round. Robert Morris took the first of those by a 3–0 count, upsetting the second-ranked Spartans behind two Weaver goals and an Ashley Miller shutout. MSU got even the next year with a 2–1 win that snapped the four-year run of RMU vs. Lindenwood title games. In 2011's tournament, a 4–0 loss to MSU in the pool round helped stop the Eagles short of the semifinals for the first time in seven years en route to an eventual national championship for the Spartans, while 2013's pool round tilt went to the Eagles thanks, in part, to two Chelsea Kasprick tallies.

Once Robert Morris joined the CCWHA in 2010, it gave the programs an additional venue for competition. Michigan State, however, has won all four matchups to date in the league playoffs. Two of those contests took place in the same postseason, 2013, after RMU had won the conference regular season crown (and both CCWHA titles in 2011–12). However, Spartans goalie Maria Barlow shut out the always-potent Eagles twice in the tournament - once in the pool round, then by a 1–0 count in the CCWHA championship game.

The rivalry will have a decidedly different tone as the Lakers identity takes over, with Roosevelt rebuilding and MSU remaining one of the ACHA's top programs.

Michigan State won the 2019–20 season series from Robert Morris by sweeping a pair of games in East Lansing, Michigan on January 25 and 26, 2020.

=== Lindenwood ===
Although now essentially dormant as a result of LU's move to NCAA Division I for the 2011–12 season, the Lions and RMU ruled the ACHA's top women's division for most of the 2000s.

The teams met five times during the first two seasons of Robert Morris' program, but the rivalry began in earnest during the 2005–06 season. That year, Eagles took three of four early-season meetings, but in the 2006 ACHA championship game - played at LU's home Lindenwood Ice Arena - Kristen Dlugos' goal 1:40 into overtime delivered the title for the Lions. That game kicked off a run of four straight seasons that ended with Robert Morris and Lindenwood playing each other for the title. RMU took the final victory in 2007, but the Lions emerged with the championship in 2008 and 2009, in addition to their 2006 win.

The 2008 championship game was a particularly notable moment in the rivalry, as Ashley Boye assisted on both Lindenwood goals to help LU recapture the crown with a 2–1 victory at Edge Ice Arena. Boye had been a star for the Eagles during the 2004–05 and 2005–06 seasons (winning the 2005 ACHA title in the process) before departing for St. Lawrence's NCAA Division I program in 2006–07. She then returned to the ACHA for that 2007–08 season, but with Lindenwood, where she helped defeat her former team for the title on its home ice.

Fortunately for Robert Morris, the transfer train ran both ways, as former Lions ace Mandy Dion headed to Chicago in 2010–11 and posted the most prolific single season in Eagles history, with 122 points. Dion would also subsequently serve as an assistant coach and recruiting coordinator at RMU for five seasons.

The teams met for one final weekend in 2011–12, where Lindenwood, then in their first season as an NCAA program, swept a three-game series with RMU by 4–1, 4–1, and 6–0 scorelines. Those results gave Lindenwood an indefinite 28–11–4 series lead, although LU added a second team for the 2020–21 season following the dissolution of the team at the school's Belleville campus which will, in some sense, reboot the series during the Roosevelt era.

== Players ==
=== Current roster ===
As of May 15, 2020.

| No. | Nat. | Player | Class | Pos | Height | DoB | Hometown | Previous team |
|---|---|---|---|---|---|---|---|---|
| 1 | | Kayla Johnson | Sophomore | G | 5' 11" (1.8 m) | | Wheeling, Illinois | Loyola Academy (USHS–IL) |
| 4 | | Alexis Schultz | Sophomore | F | 5' 2" (1.57 m) | 2000-09-25 | Grayslake, Illinois | Warren Township High School (USHS–IL) |
| 5 | | Melanie Price | Sophomore | D | 5' 5" (1.65 m) | | St. Paul, Minnesota | North St. Paul/Tartan High School (USHS–MN) |
| 10 | | Ali Sinnett | Senior | D | 5' 7" (1.7 m) | 1999-06-28 | Carmel, Indiana | Carmel High School (USHS–IN) |
| 11 | | Valerie Whalen | Senior | F | 5' 8" (1.73 m) | 1999-02-25 | Chicago, Illinois | Glen Ellyn Admirals (USAH Central) |
| 14 | | Xochitl Ryskamp | Sophomore | F | 5' 6" (1.68 m) | 2001-04-13 | Glen Ellyn, Illinois | Glenbard Hockey (USHS–IL) |
| 19 | | Kristin Minick | Sophomore | F | 5' 6" (1.68 m) | | Aurora, Illinois | Glen Ellyn Admirals (USAH Central) |
| 24 | | Sarah Ihmoud | Junior | D | 5' 4" (1.63 m) | 2000-03-24 | Elmwood Park, Illinois | Maine High School (USHS–IL) |
| 25 | | Emily Urban (C) | Senior | F | 5' 9" (1.75 m) | 1998-07-09 | Worth, Illinois | Andrew Rattlers (USHS–IL) |
| 28 | | Morgan Donchez (A) | Junior | F | 5' 6" (1.68 m) | 1999-03-05 | Lockport, Illinois | Chicago Mission (USAH Central) |
| 35 | | Annette Scislowicz | Junior | G | 5' 9" (1.75 m) | 2000-03-23 | Tinley Park, Illinois | Naperville Sabres (USAH Central) |
| 36 | | Madison Laue | Sophomore | G | 5' 4" (1.63 m) | | Mansfield, Texas | Anaheim Lady Ducks (USAH Pacific) |
| 42 | | Micki Crawford | Sophomore | D | 5' 7" (1.7 m) | | Chicago, Illinois | Glenbard Hockey (USHS–IL) |
| 55 | | Cora Weibye | Sophomore | D | 5' 6" (1.68 m) | | Plainfield, Illinois | Glen Ellyn Admirals (USAH Central) |
| 76 | | Melina Tiltin | Sophomore | F | 5' 6" (1.68 m) | | Lisle, Illinois | Glen Ellyn Admirals (USAH Central) |

=== Notable alumni ===
- Danielle McCutcheon (2007–11) - Former player for the EHV Sabres in the Austria women's ice hockey Bundesliga and the Elite Women's Hockey League
- Savannah Varner (2004–08) - Former player for Alleghe in Italian Serie A
- Hayley Williams (2013–14) – Player for SK Gorny in the Russian Women's Hockey League; former player for the Toronto Furies of the Canadian Women's Hockey League (CWHL), the Brampton Thunder of the CWHL, and the Buffalo Beauts of the National Women's Hockey League, and a participant in the 1st NWHL All-Star Game

== See also ==
- American Collegiate Hockey Association
- Central Collegiate Women's Hockey Association
- Edge Ice Arena
- Roosevelt University
- Robert Morris University Illinois
