= Hayley Williams (ice hockey) =

Hungarian-American ice hockey player

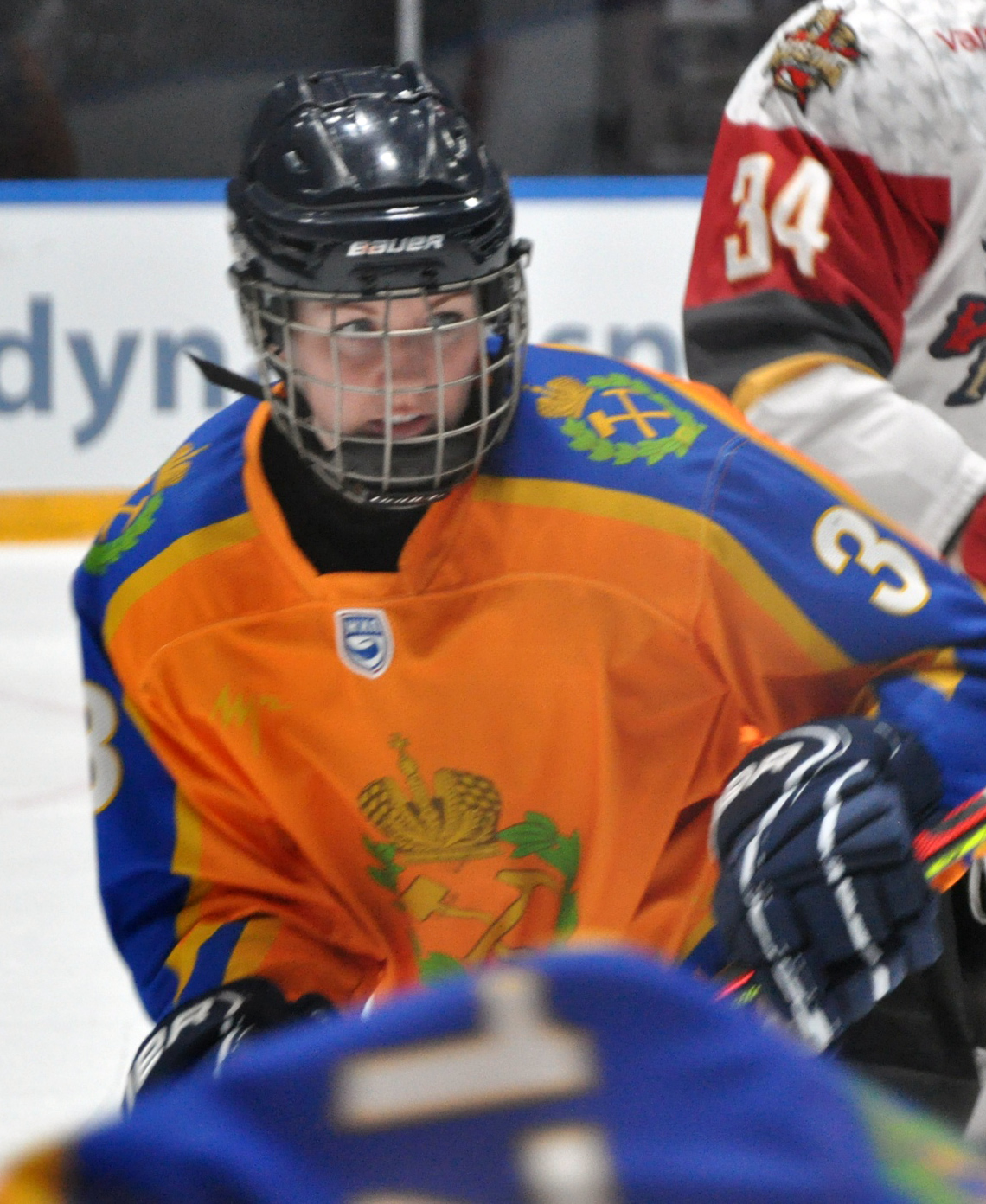
- Williams with SK Gorny in 2020
- Born: June 3, 1990 (age 36) Crete, Illinois, United States
- Height: 5 ft 4 in (163 cm)
- Weight: 137 lb (62 kg; 9 st 11 lb)
- Position: Center
- Shoots: Right
- EWHL team Former teams: HK Budapest: Dinamo-Neva St. Petersburg; KMH Budapest; SK Gorny; Toronto Furies; Brampton Thunder; Buffalo Beauts; Miami RedHawks; Robert Morris Eagles; Bemidji State Beavers
- National team: United States and Hungary
- Playing career: 2009–present
Medal record
Representing United States
Winter Universiade
Bronze medal – third place	2013 Trentino	Ice hockey

Hayley Williams (born June 3, 1990) is a Hungarian-American professional ice hockey player and member of the Hungarian national team, currently playing in the European Women's Hockey League (EWHL) with HK Budapest. She previously played in the Zhenskaya Hockey League (ZhHL), the National Women's Hockey League (NWHL), and the Canadian Women's Hockey League (CWHL), and is a three-time professional all-star, having been selected to the 2016 NWHL All-Star Game as well as the 2019 and 2020 ZhHL All-Star Games.

Williams represented Hungary at the IIHF Women's World Championship in 2022 and 2023. She represented the United States in the women's ice hockey tournaments at the 2013 Winter Universiade and the 2015 Winter Universiade, winning a bronze medal in 2013.

== Playing career ==
=== Youth hockey ===
Williams spent most of her youth career with Team Illinois, before finishing with the Chicago Mission as an under-19 (19U) player. At the 2008 USA Hockey Girls 19U National Championships in West Chester, Pennsylvania, she scored the winning goal in triple overtime to help the Mission – a team also featuring future Olympians Megan Bozek and Kendall Coyne – down Little Caesars for the national title.

=== College ===
==== Bemidji State (2009–10) ====
Williams committed to play NCAA Division I hockey with the Bemidji State Beavers women's ice hockey program and immediately contributed to a successful 2009–10 season. Despite going 3–22–3 overall in 2008–09 and being a unanimous WCHA last-place pick for 2009–10, the Beavers made history during the league playoffs. With Williams in the lineup for both wins, Bemidji State University (BSU) rallied to defeat St. Cloud State in the best-of-three opening round of the WCHA tournament, snapping a 14-game playoff losing streak and advancing to the WCHA Final Face-Off for the first time in program history.

However, her time with the Beavers was derailed by academic issues, and Williams ultimately played only 16 games with BSU.

Despite leaving the hockey team after 2009–10, Williams remained enrolled at Bemidji through the summer of 2012, including playing outfield for the Beavers softball team during the 2011 season.

==== Robert Morris (2013–14) ====
By the fall of 2012, Williams had moved home to the Chicago area, and began volunteering for the USHL's Chicago Steel which, at the time, played its home games at Edge Ice Arena in Bensenville, Illinois. Through a chance meeting with a former teammate who went on to play for Robert Morris University Illinois (RMU; which shared Edge Ice Arena with the Steel), Williams wound up enrolling at RMU and practicing with the Robert Morris Eagles women's ice hockey team during the 2012–13 season. She then joined the Eagles' full roster for 2013–14, marking an official return to college hockey after a three-and-a-half-year absence.

Williams immediately found chemistry with one of the Eagles' established stars, Ramey Weaver. The pair would go on to form two-thirds of the ACHA's best line, as each earned a spot on the ACHA's first All-American team and the duo finished 1-2 among the national scoring leaders. Williams scored 34 goals and 73 points that season in route to winning the Zoë M. Harris Award as the ACHA's Player of the Year. Weaver, who wound up her career after 2013–14 as Robert Morris' all-time leading scorer, added 32 goals and 55 points.

The Eagles largely breezed through their regular season schedule. With Williams putting up nine games with four points or more (including one late-season stretch where she accomplished the feat four times in five games), and delivering late winning goals against Colorado State and Adrian on two of the few occasions RMU was seriously challenged. The Eagles were 22–5–4 during the regular season, good for second in the Central Collegiate Women's Hockey Association (CCWHA) behind Miami, and were ranked third or fourth in the ACHA throughout the entire year.

Things abruptly turned south at playoff time however, as RMU was eliminated in the pool round at both the CCWHA playoffs and the ACHA National Tournament. Williams, for her part, was named first team all-tournament at both events after posting 12 points in six games between the two.

==== Miami (2014–15) ====
Williams transferred to Miami University in Oxford, Ohio for the 2014–15 season, adding even more firepower to a RedHawks team that had quickly risen to prominence to win both the CCWHA and ACHA titles in 2013–14.

With Miami, Williams largely picked up where she left off the year before, putting up 15 points in her first four games of the season as the RedHawks routed Lindenwood–Belleville and Midland. She got even better in November as the games got tougher, taking home the ACHA's Harrow Player of the Month award by scoring seven goals as Miami defeated a string of top teams including UMass (in a rematch of the 2014 national championship game), Adrian, Minnesota, and Liberty. Williams then burned her old RMU team for a goal in each game of a sweep in December, and delivered a two-goal, two assist effort in a 7–4 win over Rhode Island.

The RedHawks were the wire-to-wire number one team and only lost twice during the regular season, a January defeat at home to Penn State (Miami's first loss in more than one calendar year) and another the next month against Michigan State, although Williams and four other key RedHawks missed the latter contest while at the 2015 Winter Universiade tournament in Spain. The quintet then returned for the CCWHA playoffs, in time to help the team win a second consecutive league title with a 4–2 win over Michigan, with Williams contributing a goal and an assist in the championship game.

During most of the ACHA National Tournament at York City Ice Arena in York, Pennsylvania, Miami looked like a safe bet to repeat its 2014 title. Despite a tie with Adrian, the RedHawks won Group B with wins over Minnesota and Michigan, then had little issue with Grand Valley State in a crossover semifinal. In the final however, Liberty scored three goals during one 64-second first-period stretch, outweighing Williams' second-period goal as the Flames won their first national championship by a 4–1 count.

Despite the setback, and for the second straight year, Williams conducted a clean sweep of the major national honors. She was once again voted as the Zoë M. Harris Award winner after a combined total of 59 points, becoming just the second player at the Division 1 level to earn the award twice (another player has accomplished the feat since), while also winning first team all-season and all-tournament honors for both the ACHA and CCWHA.

Williams went on to complete her Bachelor of Science degree from Miami in kinesiology, through the Sport Leadership and Management program with a coaching concentration, in 2016 while playing professional hockey.

=== Professional ===
==== NWHL (2015–16) ====
After learning of the launch of a new North American women's professional league, the National Women's Hockey League (rebranded as the Premier Hockey Federation (PHF) in 2021), Williams attended free agent camps during the summer of 2015 ahead of the NWHL's inaugural season, eventually earning a contract with the Buffalo Beauts. With their signings announced by the Beauts at the same time, she and UMass Minutemen alumna Paige Harrington became the first former ACHA players to sign in the league and the first in any North American women's professional league since the 2002–03 season.

Williams scored her first NWHL goal on November 22, 2015, burying to tie a game against the Connecticut Whale at 6–6 with 3:23 remaining in the second period, although the Whale would go on to win in a shootout. She added four assists while playing in 17 of the Beauts' 18 regular season games.

A fan vote determined the last four participants in the 1st NWHL All-Star Game on January 24, 2016, and, after receiving 6,384 votes, Williams was added to Team Knight, an All-Star team captained by Team USA and then-Boston Pride player Hilary Knight. She went on to score Team Knight's only goal of the game in a blowout loss to Team Pfalzer, captained by then-Buffalo Beauts players Emily Pfalzer.

The 2015–16 Buffalo Beauts season, saw a third-place finish in the standings with a 5–9–4 record, and an appearance in the first-ever Isobel Cup Final after rallying to upset Connecticut in a best-of-three semifinal. However, the Beauts were defeated in the championship series by the Boston Pride.

==== CWHL (2016–18) ====
After the Beauts only offered Williams a spot as a "practice player" for the 2016–17 season (practice players are members of the team, but not permitted to play in games unless the team is otherwise shorthanded), Williams looked for opportunities in the Canadian Women's Hockey League and earned a roster spot for the 2016–17 CWHL season with the Brampton Thunder via tryout. She played in 14 games with Brampton, helping the team to a 12–10–1–1 (W–L–OTL–SOL) record and a third-place finish in the regular season, although they were quickly eliminated in the best-of-three semifinals by Les Canadiennes de Montréal.

The following season, the Thunder relocated to Markham, Ontario, which is located on the opposite side of Toronto from Brampton. Williams, who still lived in Buffalo dating to her time with the Beauts, negotiated a trade to the Toronto Furies (which played at the Mastercard Centre For Hockey Excellence in Toronto's western neighborhoods, a bit closer to Buffalo than Markham) and spent 2017–18 with the Thunder's archrival. Playing frequently with Jenna Dingeldein, Jessica Vella, and Carolyne Prévost, Williams rediscovered her offensive touch with the Furies, finishing the year fourth on the team in scoring with 14 points. She scored her first CWHL goal on November 11, 2017, to help Toronto beat the Calgary Inferno in a shootout. The next month, she assisted on Jessica Platt's first career goal on December 7, then was named the Furies' player for the game for a two-assist effort in a loss to Calgary ten days later. Late-season highlights included a Furies sweep of the perennially-contending Inferno on January 27 and 28 by 3–2 and 5–2 scores, with Williams scoring the winning goal in the first game on a 5-on-3 advantage with 3:21 remaining. She also capped off the weekend by scoring an empty-net goal to seal victory in the second game, in front of a national television audience on Sportsnet.

Despite those individual successes, the Furies uncharacteristically struggled throughout most of the season, missing the playoffs with a 9–17–1–1 record and a sixth-place finish.

==== ZhHL (2018–20) ====
Along with former Beauts teammate Tatiana Rafter, Williams jumped to the other side of the globe for the 2018–19 season as an import player in the Russian Zhenskaya Hockey League (ZhHL) for SK Gorny, announcing the transaction on Instagram.

Williams arrived to find a team in something of a chaotic state. Originally known as Arktik-Universitet Ukhta and operated in conjunction with Ukhta State Technical University, the organization was in the middle of a complete overhaul that would see it rebrand as SK Gorny for the start of the 2018–19 season, then relocate from the small industrial city of Ukhta to the major metropolis of Saint Petersburg midway through the campaign. Furthermore, Arktik-Universitet had not been successful on the ice, winning just four times in 24 games during 2017–18.

Thanks to the arrivals of Williams and Rafter, along with a nucleus that included Russian women's national ice hockey team players Fanuza Kadirova and Liana Ganeyeva, Gorny slowly became increasingly competitive within the league, improving to 12 wins in 2018–19. Williams, for her part, scored her first two Russian goals in a win over Biryusa Krasnoyarsk on October 18, 2018, then added key goals to help the squad defeat perennially-strong Tornado Dmitrov and Dinamo Saint Petersburg over the following two weekends. In all, she finished her rookie year in Russia with ten goals, tied for second-most on SK Gorny, while her 19 points ranked 38th across the entire league. Williams' exploits merited a spot in the ZhHL's All-Star Game, played on January 13, 2019, in Nizhnekamsk. With the SK Gorny trio of Williams, Rafter, and Kadirova each scoring a goal in the contest, the West downed the East 4–2.

The following season, both Williams and SK Gorny improved. The team contended for a playoff berth until the end of the year, thanks in part to the addition of Russian national player Alexandra Vafina, who joined from SKIF Nizhny Novgorod. SK Gorny ultimately finished the regular season in fifth place, three points behind Biryusa for the final spot, and the player bumped up her stats production to 11 goals (14th in the league) and 22 points (16th). She picked up an assist in arguably SK Gorny's biggest win, a 2–1 overtime victory against eventual league champion, the Shenzhen KRS Vanke Rays, late in the season, and notched a professional-career-best four points (on two goals and two assists) in a season-opening rout of SKSO Yekaterinburg.

Williams participated in her second straight ZhHL All-Star Game on January 12, 2020, in Moscow, although her Team West dropped a 4–1 decision to Team East.

==== EWHL (2020–2022) ====
SK Gorny ran into financial difficulties late in the 2020 offseason and unexpectedly folded ahead of the 2020–21 ZhHL season, leaving Williams to scramble for a team. She ultimately signed in the European Women's Hockey League (EWHL) with the women's representative team of KMH Budapest for the 2020–21 EWHL season, despite feeling "really sad to have to leave" Russia. Playing on a line with Réka Dabasi and Hungary's best goal-scorer, Alexandra Huszák, she led the league in points and assists in her debut season with KMH, scoring 9 goals and 22 assists for 31 points in fifteen games and recording a league-leading +28 plus–minus. Her contributions helped KMH claim their third consecutive EWHL Championship in 2021.

When she first signed with KMH, Williams planned to return to Russia after playing six months in Hungary but she was soon offered a place on the Hungarian national team. After consideration, she accepted the national team offer, which required that she become naturalized; she was required to play in Hungary for at least two years as a stipulation of citizenship, which prompted her to remain with KMH Budapest through the 2021–22 season.

Williams' second season with KMH was not quite as explosive as her first, though she still managed 13 goals and 14 assists for 27 points in eighteen games, ranking fourth on the team and sixth in the league for regular season points. KMH Budapest claimed the EWHL Championship title again in 2022, bolstered by a goal and an assist from Williams in the playoffs. Her 8 points scored across the five games of the EWHL Super Cup were good for eighth place out of all players in the tournament and she tied four other players to rank fourth for assists, with 5. Led by the scoring of Williams and Rhyen McGill, KMH Budapest won the 2022 EWHL Super Cup.

==== ZhHL (2022–) ====
After her requisite two seasons in Hungary were finished, Williams explored opportunities to play elsewhere, including returning to the United States to play in the PHF, prior to the 2022–23 season. Ultimately, her love for Russia coupled with a two-year contract from Dinamo-Neva St. Petersburg prompted her to return to the ZhHL. Following the 2022 Russian invasion of Ukraine, Williams was the only American or Hungarian citizen to join the Zhenskaya Hockey League for the 2022–23 season and the only North American-born player to sign with a Russian team; the other four North American-born players signed with the league’s sole Chinese team, Shenzhen KRS. She joined a group of less than ten American ice hockey players who opted play for premier Russian teams despite warnings from the United States Department of State urging all Americans to leave Russia.

== International play ==
=== Winter Universiade ===
Williams was selected as a member of the United States National University Team, which competes at the Winter Universiade, during both of her ACHA seasons, and also named an alternate captain each time.

The 2013 edition of the tournament, played in Trentino, Italy resulted in a bronze medal for Williams and Team USA after a third-place game win over Japan - the first-ever podium finish for an American women's team at the event and the first for the U.S. men or women in USA Hockey's modern era of participation (since 2001). Williams' contributions to the success were significant – she assisted on a late clinching goal by Katie Augustine in the team's biggest win, a 4–2 victory over a Russia team featuring several Russia women's national ice hockey team members to open the tournament. In the bronze medal match against Japan, Williams again assisted Augustine for the go-ahead goal early in the third period, then scored in the waning moments of the 3–1 victory.

Although the 2015 version of the team was unable to follow up that success and was quickly knocked out of contention at the 2015 tournament in Granada, Spain, Williams did provide one of the squad's signature moments. During a match against Kazakhstan in the 5th through 7th place consolation round robin, Team USA found itself trailing 2–1 in the last three minutes of the game. Williams then scooped up a loose puck near center ice, carried in herself and scored from the bottom of the left circle with 2:37 remaining. The U.S. went on to win in overtime, a result that eventually allowed the team to finish fifth. Williams scored a pair of goals and added four assists to tie for the team scoring lead.

== Personal life ==
Williams was born in Crete, Illinois, United States, a village situated about 30 miles (48 km) south of Chicago in the Chicago metropolitan area. A citizen of the United States by birth, she gained multiple citizenship after becoming a naturalized Hungarian citizen in 2021.

When she began playing in the ZhHL in 2018, she "fell in love with the country of Russia" and learned the Russian language.

Williams is the founder of Hockey Worldwide, an ice hockey training and coaching organization based in Crete, Illinois that produces on-ice camps and off-ice training programs.

== Career statistics ==
=== Regular season and playoffs ===
			Regular season					Playoffs
Season	Team	League	GP	G	A	Pts	PIM	GP	G	A	Pts	PIM
2009–10	Bemidji State Beavers	NCAA	16	0	0	0	8	—	—	—	—	—
2013–14	Robert Morris Eagles	ACHA	32	31	37	68	44	3	3	2	5	4
2014–15	Miami RedHawks	ACHA	25	27	26	53	12	5	3	3	6	2
2015–16	Buffalo Beauts	NWHL	17	1	4	5	14	3	0	0	0	0
2016–17	Brampton Thunder	CWHL	14	0	0	0	2	1	0	0	0	0
2017–18	Toronto Furies	CWHL	28	4	10	14	22	—	—	—	—	—
2018–19	SK Gorny	ZhHL	35	10	9	19	40	—	—	—	—	—
2019–20	SK Gorny	ZhHL	28	11	11	22	18	—	—	—	—	—
2020–21	KMH Budapest	EWHL	15	9	22	31	33	2	1	0	1	6
2021–22	KMH Budapest	EWHL	18	13	14	27	24	4	1	1	2	2
2022–23	Dinamo-Neva	ZhHL	21	6	4	10	6	–	–	–	–	–
ACHA totals			57	58	63	121	56	8	6	5	11	6
CWHL totals			42	4	10	14	24	1	0	0	0	0
ZhHL totals			84	27	24	51	64	—	—	—	—	—
EWHL totals			33	22	36	58	57	6	2	1	3	8

=== International ===
Year	Team	Event	Result	GP	G	A	Pts	PIM
2013	United States U25	Uni	3rd place, bronze medalist(s)	7	2	3	5	4
2015	United States U25	Uni	5th	5	2	4	6	4
2021	Hungary	OGQ	DNQ	3	0	3	3	6
2022	Hungary	WW	8th	4	0	0	0	4
2023	Hungary	WW	9th	4	0	0	0	2

== Awards and honors ==
Award	Year
ACHA
Zoë M. Harris Award; ACHA Player of the Year	2013–14, 2014–15
All-American First Team	2013–14, 2014–15
All-Tournament First Team	2014, 2015
All-CCWHA First Team	2013–14, 2014–15
All-CCWHA Tournament First Team	2013–14, 2014–15
Harrow Player of the Month	November 2014
NWHL
All-Star Game	2016
ZhHL
All-Star Game	2019, 2020
EWHL
EWHL Champion	2021, 2022
EWHL Super Cup Champion	2022
Most points, regular season	2020–21
