= Jared Williamson =

American football coach (born c. 1983)

Current position
- Title: Head coach
- Team: Illinois Wesleyan
- Conference: CCIW
- Record: 4–6

Biographical details
- Born: c. 1983 (age 42–43); Dallas, Texas, U.S.
- Education: Mayville State University (2006); Illinois State University

Playing career
- 2002–2005: Mayville State
- Position: Quarterback

Coaching career (HC unless noted)
- 2006–2007: Illinois Wesleyan (GA)
- 2008–2010: Illinois Wesleyan (OC/QB)
- 2011–2019: Robert Morris (IL)
- 2020–2024: Roosevelt
- 2025–present: Illinois Wesleyan

Head coaching record
- Overall: 77–76
- Tournaments: 0–1 (NAIA playoffs)

Accomplishments and honors

Awards
- 2× All-DAC (2004–2005)

Jared Williamson (born c. 1983) is an American college football coach. He is the head football coach for Illinois Wesleyan University, a position he has held since 2025. He was the head football coach for Robert Morris University Illinois from the program's inception in 2011 until its dissolution in 2019 when Roosevelt University and then Roosevelt University from 2020 to 2024. He played college football for Mayville State as a quarterback.

== Head coaching record ==
| Year | Team | Overall | Conference | Standing | Bowl/playoffs | NAIA Coaches'^{#} |
|---|---|---|---|---|---|---|
Robert Morris Eagles (NAIA independent) (2011–2012)
| 2011 | Robert Morris | 4–6 | | | | |
| 2012 | Robert Morris | 8–3 | | | | |
Robert Morris Eagles (Mid-States Football Association) (2013–2019)
| 2013 | Robert Morris | 7–4 | 3–3 | T–4th (MEL) | | |
| 2014 | Robert Morris | 8–3 | 3–3 | T–4th (MEL) | | 20 |
| 2015 | Robert Morris | 6–4 | 3–2 | T–3rd (MWL) | | |
| 2016 | Robert Morris | 7–4 | 5–0 | 1st (MWL) | L NAIA First Round | 15 |
| 2017 | Robert Morris | 2–9 | 1–4 | T–5th (MWL) | | |
| 2018 | Robert Morris | 2–9 | 1–4 | 5th (MWL) | | |
| 2019 | Robert Morris | 5–5 | 4–2 | T–2nd (MWL) | | |
| Robert Morris: | | 49–47 | 20–18 | | | |
Roosevelt Lakers (Mid-States Football Association) (2020–2023)
| 2020–21 | Roosevelt | 6–1 | 5–1 | 2nd (MWL) | | 20 |
| 2021 | Roosevelt | 4–6 | 3–4 | T–4th (MWL) | | |
| 2022 | Roosevelt | 7–3 | 4–3 | 4th (MWL) | | |
| 2023 | Roosevelt | 6–4 | 4–1 | 2nd (MWL) | | |
Roosevelt Lakers (Great Lakes Intercollegiate Athletic Conference) (2024)
| 2024 | Roosevelt | 1–9 | 1–6 | 7th | | |
| Roosevelt: | | 24–23 | 17–15 | | | |
Illinois Wesleyan Titans (College Conference of Illinois and Wisconsin) (2025–present)
| 2025 | Illinois Wesleyan | 4–6 | 4–5 | T–5th | | |
| 2026 | Illinois Wesleyan | 0–0 | 0–0 | | | |
| Illinois Wesleyan: | | 4–6 | 4–5 | | | |
| Total: | | 77–76 | | | | |
National championship Conference title Conference division title or championship game berth
