= Morris Field (Roosevelt–Illinois) =

Stadium in Arlington Heights, Illinois, US

Coordinates: 42.04525°N 87.97075°W

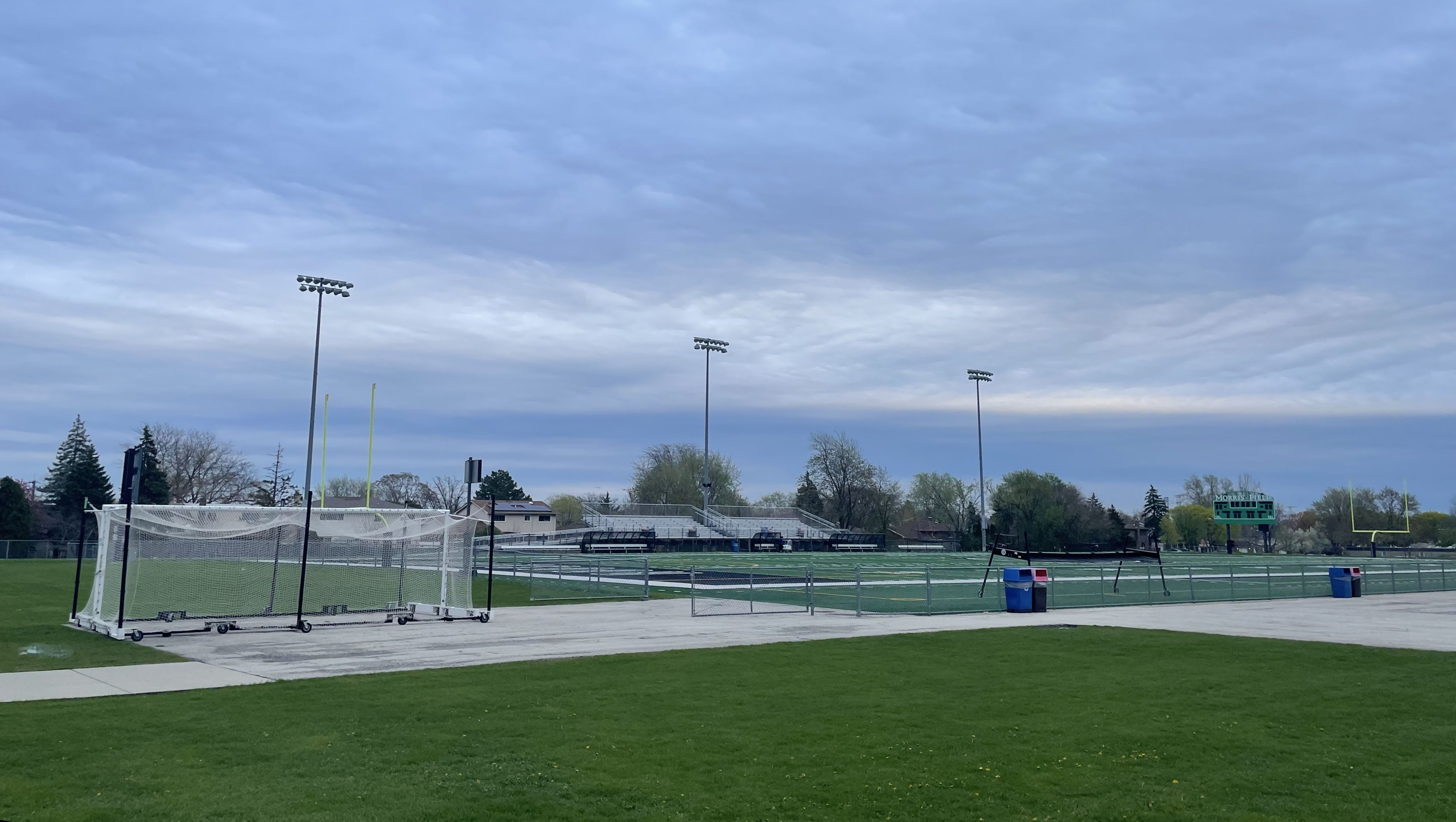
- Interactive map of Morris Field
- Address: 2123 S Goebbert Road
- Location: Arlington Heights, Illinois
- Owner: Roosevelt University
- Operator: Roosevelt University
- Surface: Artificial turf

Construction
- Renovated: 2013

Tenant
- Roosevelt Lakers (NAIA)

Morris Field is a multi-purpose outdoor stadium, located in Arlington Heights, Illinois. The stadium previously housed the Robert Morris (Illinois) Eagles football, men's and women's Lacrosse and men's and women's soccer teams, and is currently used by the Roosevelt Lakers athletic teams after the two universities merged in 2020.

The stadium was renovated in 2013.
