= Roosevelt Lakers =

- University: Roosevelt University
- Nickname: Lakers
- NCAA: Division II (transitionary)
- Conference: GLIAC (primary); GLVC (affiliate, men's volleyball)
- Location: Chicago, Illinois
- Varsity teams: 20
- Football stadium: Morris Field
- Basketball arena: Goodman Center
- Ice hockey arena: Edge Ice Arena
- Baseball stadium: Ozinga Field
- Softball stadium: Ballpark at Rosemont
- Soccer stadium: Morris Field
- Golf course: Flossmoor Golf Club
- Tennis venue: XS Tennis
- Other venues: Diversey River Bowl (bowling)
- Colors: Green and white
- Website: rooseveltlakers.com

The Roosevelt Lakers are the athletic teams that represent Roosevelt University, located in Chicago, Illinois, in NCAA Division II intercollegiate sports. As of the 2025–26 school year, Roosevelt are transitional NCAA members as they move athletic teams from the National Association of Intercollegiate Athletics to Division II.

The Lakers are members of the Great Lakes Intercollegiate Athletic Conference (GLIAC) for 15 of 17 sports. The other two programs, men's volleyball and women's bowling, respectively play in the Great Lakes Valley Conference and as an independent.

The Lakers previously competed in the Chicagoland Collegiate Athletic Conference (CCAC) of the National Association of Intercollegiate Athletics (NAIA) between 2010 (when the school revived its athletics program and joined the NAIA) and 23.

== History ==
Roosevelt University revived its athletic program after a 20-year absence in 2010. Roosevelt added women's volleyball for the 2011–12 academic year, followed by men's golf, men's and women's soccer, and softball for the 2012–13 academic year.

The Lakers announced in April 2020 their addition of football and men's/women's ice hockey for the 2020–21 academic year, having been acquired from Robert Morris (when they competed as the Eagles); this merged expanded the university's offering of athletics programs from the initial seven to fourteen.

The ice hockey teams joined the American Collegiate Hockey Association (ACHA) and inherited the Eagles' former ACHA affiliation.

On August 1, 2022, Roosevelt announced that it would move to the NCAA Division II and join the GLIAC, starting in the 2023–24 school year as a provisional member, before competing in full GLIAC membership in 2024–25.

== Varsity sports ==
=== Teams ===
Men's sports (11)

- Basketball
- Bowling
- Cross Country
- Ice hockey
- Soccer
- Baseball
- Tennis
- Track and field (indoor and outdoor)
- Volleyball
- Football
- Golf

Women's sports (9)

- Basketball
- Bowling
- Cross Country
- Ice hockey
- Soccer
- Softball
- Tennis
- Track and field (indoor and outdoor)
- Volleyball

== Facilities ==
The 20,000-capacity SeatGeek Stadium was previously the home of the Roosevelt Lakers soccer teams. The team currently plays at Morris Field in Arlington Heights.

The Lillian and Larry Goodman Center is located at 501 S. Wabash Avenue, which is the southeast corner of the intersection known as Ida B. Wells Drive and Wabash Avenue. The Goodman Center is a two-story, 27,834-gross-square-foot field house featuring a multi-purpose gymnasium on the second floor and first-floor space containing offices, meeting rooms, a team lounge, locker rooms, an athletic training room, and a strength and conditioning center.
