= 2009–10 Bemidji State Beavers women's ice hockey season =

- Conference: ECAC
- Home ice: John S. Glas Field House

Rankings
- USA Today/USA Hockey Magazine: N/A
- USCHO.com/CBS College Sports: N/A

Record
- Overall: 12-19-7

Coaches and captains
- Head coach: Steve Sertich
- Captain: Franny Dorr
- Alternate captain(s): Jackie Robertson and Erin Cody

The Bemidji State Beavers women's ice hockey team represented Bemidji State University and participated in the Western Collegiate Hockey Association. This was the Beavers final season in the John S. Glas Field House. For the 2010–11 season, the Beavers will move into the Bemidji Regional Events Center. Goaltender Zuzana Tomčíková represented her homeland of Slovakia in Ice hockey at the 2010 Winter Olympics. Bemidji State doubled their win production compared to the 2008–09 season, when the Beavers claimed only six victories.

== Offseason ==
- May 11: The Beavers signed two more players to National Letters of Intent, joining the four that were inked during the early signing period in November 2008. All six players will play for BSU in fall 2009. Molly Arola and Jamie Hatheway have both inked with BSU during the spring signing period. They join early signees Sadie Lundquist, Mackenzie Thurston, Keirstin Visser and Erika Wheelhouse.
- May 19: Head coach Steve Sertich announced that senior Franny Dorr, senior Jackie Robertson and junior Erin Cody have been selected as captains for the upcoming 2009-10 campaign. All three players will wear the C on their sweater for the first time in their careers. All three participated in 36 games during the previous season.
- September 9: The WCHA announced that Bemidji State goaltender Zuzana Tomčíková, has been named as a WCHA All-Star. She is among 22 players from the conference to face the 2009–10 U.S Women’s National Team in St. Paul, Minn. on September 25.

== Regular season ==
=== Standings ===
2009–10 Western Collegiate Hockey Association standings
	Conference								Overall					
	GP	W	L	T	SOW	PTS	GF	GA	GP	W	L	T	GF	GA
Minnesota Duluth†*	28	20	6	2	1	43	90	55	41	31	8	2	138	83
Minnesota†	28	18	6	4	3	43	91	49	40	26	9	5	129	74
St. Cloud State	28	11	11	6	4	32	70	77	37	15	14	8	96	103
Wisconsin	28	15	12	1	0	31	84	63	36	18	15	3	107	82
Ohio State	28	12	13	3	1	28	90	94	37	17	15	5	122	117
Bemidji State	28	9	12	7	3	28	47	64	38	12	19	7	65	98
Minnesota State	28	5	18	5	3	18	49	92	34	7	22	5	66	117
North Dakota	28	7	19	2	0	16	44	71	34	8	22	4	61	92
Championship: † indicates conference regular season champion; * indicates conference tournament champion Updated July 21, 2024

=== Roster ===
Number	Name	Position	Class	Height
2	Jackie Robertson	D	Sr.	5-8
5	Nicole Rawlings	F	Sr.	5-2
6	Kaylee Keys	F	So.	5-3
8	Erin Johnson	F	Jr.	5-6
9	Annie Bauerfeld	F	Jr.	5-6
10	Emily Erickson	F	Fr.	5-9
11	Erin Babineau	F	So.	5-4
12	Lexy Parenteau	F/D	Jr.	5-6
13	Erin Cody	F	Jr.	5-7
14	Erika Wheelhouse	D	Fr.	5-3
15	Marlee Wheelhouse	F/D	So.	5-1
16	MacKenzie Thurston	F	Fr.	5-8
17	Sadie Lundquist	F	Fr.	5-5
18	Keirstin Visser	D	Fr.	5-8
20	Brittany DeBoer	D	So.	5-11
21	Hayley Williams	F	Fr.	5-4
22	Lauren Williams	F	So.	5-3
23	Molly Arola	F	Fr.	5-9
25	Montana Vichorek	D	So.	5-7
27	Franny Dorr	F	Sr.	5-7
29	Kim Lieder	F/D	So.	5-7
31	Alana McElhinney	G	So.	5-8
35	Eri Kiribuchi	G	So.	5-2
88	Zuzana Tomčíková	G	So.	5-11
91	Jamie Hatheway	F	Fr.	5-4

=== Schedule ===
Date	Time	Opponent	Location	Score	Record
Oct. 2	6:00 pm	Mercyhurst	Erie, Pa.	1-4	0-1-0
Oct. 3	1:00 pm	Mercyhurst	Erie, Pa.	1-6	0-2-0
Oct. 10	7:07 pm	Wisconsin	Coleraine, Minn.	1-0	1-2-0
Oct. 11	4:07 pm	Wisconsin	Bemidji, Minn.	1-3	1-3-0
Oct. 16	7:07 pm	Ohio State	Bemidji, Minn.	3-5	1-4-0
Oct. 17	2:07 pm	Ohio State	Bemidji, Minn.	2-2	1-4-1
Oct. 23	6:00 pm	Northeastern	Boston, Mass.	1-2	1-5-1
Oct. 24	2:00 pm	Northeastern	Boston, Mass.	2-3	1-6-1
Oct. 30	7:07 pm	Wayne State	Bemidji, Minn.	3-1	2-6-1
Oct. 31	2:07 pm	Wayne State	Bemidji, Minn.	1-6	2-7-1
Nov. 6	7:07 pm	Minnesota State	Mankato, Minn.	2-2	2-7-2
Nov. 7	3:07 pm	Minnesota State	Mankato, Minn.	3-1	3-7-2
Nov. 13	7:07 pm	St. Cloud State	Bemidji, Minn.	1-0	4-7-2
Nov. 14	2:07 pm	St. Cloud State	Bemidji, Minn.	2-5	4-8-2
Nov. 20	6:07 pm	Minnesota	Minneapolis, Minn.	2-4	4-9-2
Nov. 21	4:07 pm	Minnesota	Minneapolis, Minn.	1-3	4-10-2
Dec. 5	7:07 pm	North Dakota	Grand Forks, N.D.	3-0	5-10-2
Dec. 6	7:07 pm	North Dakota	Bemidji, Minn.	3-2 (OT)	6-10-2
Dec. 12	3:07 pm	Minnesota Duluth	Duluth, Minn.	1-4	6-11-2
Dec. 13	3:07 pm	Minnesota Duluth	Duluth, Minn.	2-2	6-11-3
Jan. 8	7:07 pm	Minnesota State	Bemidji, Minn.	2-2	6-11-4
Jan. 9	3:07 pm	Minnesota State	Bemidji, Minn.	3-0	7-11-4
Jan. 15	6:07 pm	Minnesota	Bemidji, Minn.	1-1	7-11-5
Jan. 16	4:07 pm	Minnesota	Bemidji, Minn.	1-1	7-11-6
Jan. 22	6:07 pm	Ohio State	Columbus, Ohio	2-5	7-12-6
Jan. 23	1:07 pm	Ohio State	Columbus, Ohio	1-0	8-12-6
Jan. 29	7:07 pm	St. Cloud State	St. Cloud, Minn.	2-3	8-13-6
Jan. 30	2:07 pm	St. Cloud State	St. Cloud, Minn.	3-3	8-13-7
Feb. 6	1:07 pm	Wisconsin*	Madison, Wisc.	1-6	8-14-7
Feb. 7	2:07 pm	Wisconsin	Madison, Wisc.	2-0	9-14-7
Feb. 12	7:07 pm	North Dakota	Bemijdi, Minn.	0-2	9-15-7
Feb. 13	7:07 pm	North Dakota	Grand Forks, N.D.	1-0	10-15-7
Feb. 19	2:07 pm	Minnesota Duluth	Bemidji, Minn.	2-5	10-16-7
Feb. 20	2:07 pm	Minnesota Duluth	Bemidji, Minn.	0-3	10-17-7

== Player stats ==
= Indicates team leader

=== Skaters ===
Player	Games	Goals	Assists	Points	Points/game	PIM	GWG	PPG	SHG
Erin Cody	38	20	13	33	0.8684	28	1	5	0
Annie Bauerfeld	38	9	18	27	0.7105	16	1	3	0
Montana Vichorek	38	5	12	17	0.4474	48	2	2	0
Emily Erickson	38	6	9	15	0.3947	0	1	1	0
Frances Dorr	38	4	10	14	0.3684	10	0	1	0
Erika Wheelhouse	38	0	14	14	0.3684	8	0	0	0
Erin Johnson	18	6	5	11	0.6111	38	3	2	0
Sadie Lundquist	38	2	8	10	0.2632	24	1	0	0
Keirstin Visser	38	3	3	6	0.1579	42	1	2	0
Marlee Wheelhouse	38	0	6	6	0.1579	22	0	0	0
Mackenzie Thurston	38	2	2	4	0.1053	8	0	0	0
Kimberly Lieder	35	0	4	4	0.1143	18	0	0	0
Jamie Hatheway	27	2	0	2	0.0741	8	1	0	0
Jackie Robertson	38	1	1	2	0.0526	35	0	0	0
Erin Babineau	26	0	1	1	0.0385	10	0	0	0
Lexy Parenteau	36	0	1	1	0.0278	10	0	0	0
Alana McElhinney	13	0	1	1	0.0769	6	0	0	0
Nicole Rawlings	17	0	0	0	0.0000	0	0	0	0
Kaylee Keys	15	0	0	0	0.0000	20	0	0	0
Molly Arola	24	0	0	0	0.0000	2	0	0	0
Lauren Williams	33	0	0	0	0.0000	18	0	0	0
Hayley Williams	16	0	0	0	0.0000	8	0	0	0
Zuzana Tomčíková	26	0	0	0	0.0000	2	0	0	0

=== Goaltenders ===
Player	Games Played	Minutes	Goals Against	Wins	Losses	Ties	Shutouts	Save %	Goals Against Average
Zuzana Tomčíková	26							.938	2.06
Alana McElhinney	13							.897	3.08

== Postseason ==
Date	Opponent	Location	Score	Notes
Feb. 26	St. Cloud State	St. Cloud	0-3	
Feb. 27	St. Cloud State	St. Cloud	2-1	End 14 game playoff losing streak
Feb. 28	St. Cloud State	Bemidji	4-1	Advance to first ever WCHA Final Face-Off

- February 27: Bemidji State ends its 14 game playoff losing streak in a 2-1 victory over St. Cloud State.
- February 28: By defeating St. Cloud State in Game 3, the Beavers advance to the WCHA Final Face-Off for the first time in school history. Zuzana Tomčíková had 27 saves and the win was the Beavers 12th win of the season. It ties the school record for most wins in a season (accomplished in 2001-02). The Beavers will now play the Minnesota Duluth Bulldogs in the WCHA semi-finals. In the two playoff wins, Annie Bauerfeld had four points (two goals and two assists) to lead the team in points. Montana Vichorek's three points (one goal and two assists) ranked second.

=== WCHA Final Faceoff ===
- Semifinals

Date	Opponent	Location	Score	Notes
Feb. 26	Minnesota Duluth	Ridder Arena	3-7	Emily Erickson had three points

- Notes
  - Freshman Erika Wheelhouse assisted on the final goal for her fourteenth on the season. Her number ranked second on the team.
  - Erin Cody scored her 20th goal of the season in the loss to the Bulldogs. Her 33 points (20 goals, 13 assists) was the best of her NCAA career. In the all-time ranks, she is tied for third all-time with 36 career goals.
  - Senior Jackie Robertson finished her NCAA career by playing in 144 games. She shares the record with her former teammate Brooke Collins.

== Awards and honors ==
- Steve Sertich, WCHA Coach of the Year
- Zuzana Tomčíková, WCHA Defensive Player of the Week (Week of October 12)
- Zuzana Tomčíková, WCHA Defensive Player of the Week (Week of November 9)
- Zuzana Tomčíková, WCHA Co-Defensive Player of the Week (Week of January 20)
- Zuzana Tomčíková, Patty Kazmaier Award nominee
- Zuzana Tomčíková, Co-WCHA Player of the Year
- Erika Wheelhouse, Bemidji State, WCHA Rookie of the Week (Week of January 11)
