= Robert Morris University Illinois =

Private university in Chicago, Illinois

Coordinates: 41°52′34.7″N 87°37′37.9″W

Robert Morris University
- Type: Private university
- Active: 1913–2020; 6 years ago (merged into Roosevelt University)
- Faculty: 49 (prior to 2020 merger)
- Students: 1,934 (prior to 2020 merger)
- Undergraduates: 1,699 (prior to 2020 merger)
- Postgraduates: 235 (prior to 2020 merger)
- Location: Chicago, Illinois, United States
- Colors: Maroon and Gold
- Nickname: Eagles
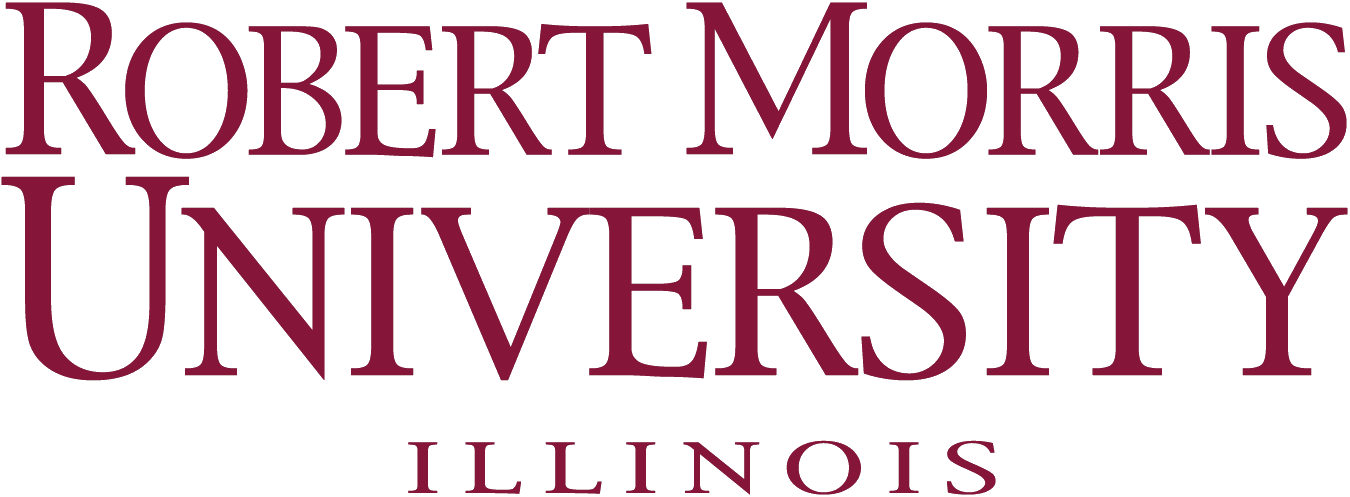

Robert Morris University Illinois, formerly Robert Morris College, was a private university with its main campus in Chicago, Illinois, United States. It was founded in 1965 but its oldest ancestor was the Moser School founded in 1913. It changed its name to Robert Morris University Illinois in 2009. In 2020, it merged into Roosevelt University, which formed under it a new Robert Morris Experiential College as one of several colleges at Roosevelt. Robert Morris offered associate and bachelor's degrees and was regionally accredited by the Higher Learning Commission.

== History ==
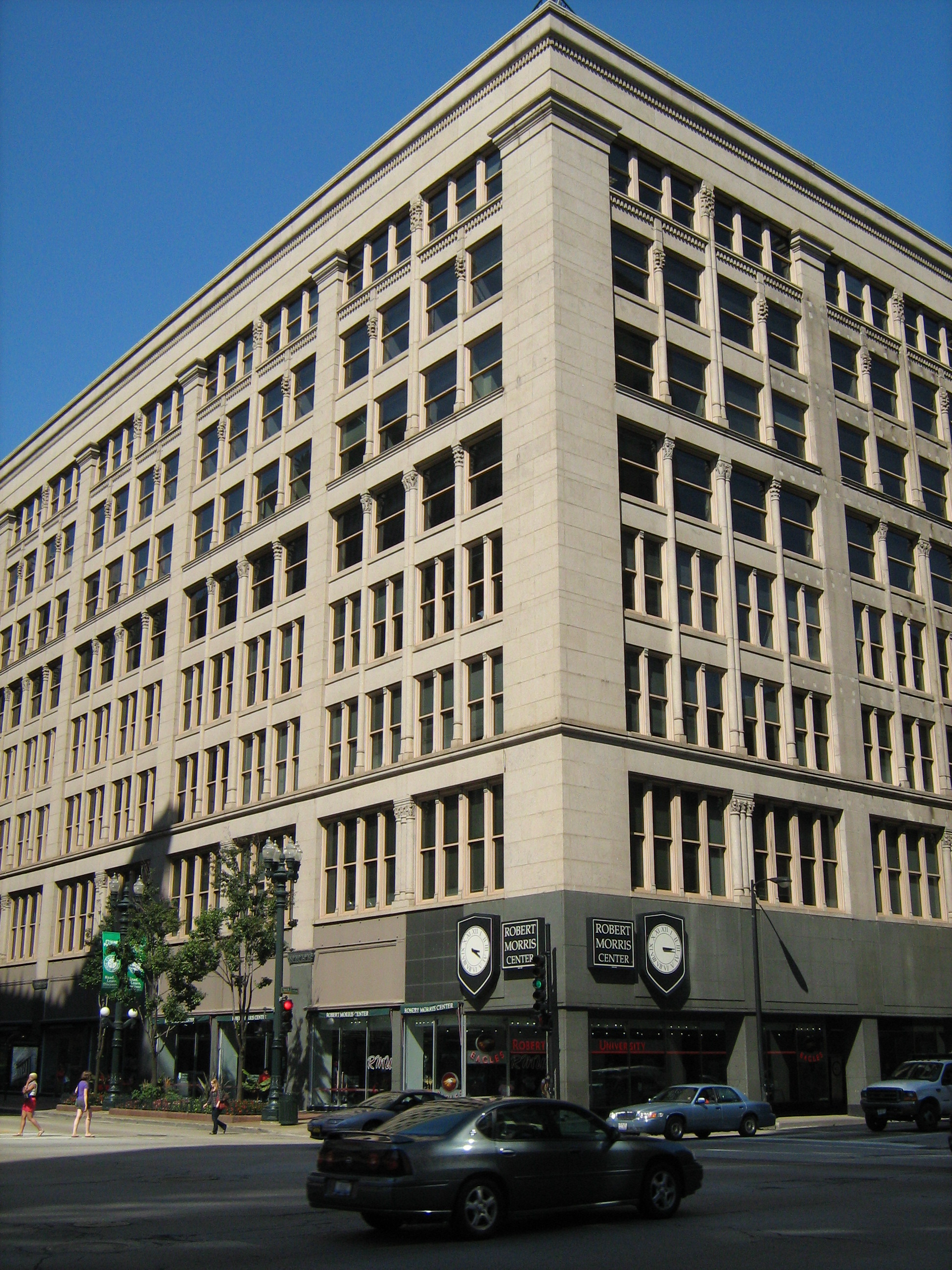
The Second Leiter Building housed the university's main campus in Chicago

Robert Morris traces its history back to the founding of the Moser School of Business in 1913. Robert Morris College itself was founded in 1965 in Carthage, Illinois as a two-year college, buying the former campus of Carthage College for $1.1 million after Carthage College had left Illinois for its newer Wisconsin campus. In 1975 Robert Morris expanded to Chicago by acquiring and merging the Moser School.

Robert Morris opened a Springfield, Illinois campus in July 1988 and closed the Carthage campus in July 1989. The college later opened campuses in Orland Park in 1991, Naperville in 1997, Bensenville in 1999, Peoria in 2000. The Orland Park campus moved to Aurora and became the DuPage Campus in 2001. Waukegan opened as the Lake County Campus in 2003. The Graduate School was established in 2005 and became a separate campus in Schaumburg in 2008. Two more campuses followed: Elgin in 2009, Arlington Heights in 2011.

In March 2020, Robert Morris University Illinois merged with Roosevelt University to become one of its colleges.

== Athletics ==
The Robert Morris athletic teams located at the Chicago campus were called the Eagles. The university was a member of the National Association of Intercollegiate Athletics (NAIA), primarily competing in the Chicagoland Collegiate Athletic Conference (CCAC) from about 1995–96 to 2019–20. Men's and women's ice hockey competed in their respective divisions of the American Collegiate Hockey Association (ACHA). After the merger, the Roosevelt Lakers added football and ice hockey beginning in the 2020–21 season after acquiring Robert Morris's teams in those sports.

In 2014 RMU became the first university to offer gaming scholarships for a varsity esports team; they competed in League of Legends, Hearthstone, and Dota 2 competitions.

=== Sports sponsored ===
- Men's basketball was one of the dominant programs in the NAIA, having reached the Final Four of the NAIA tournament three times. Othyus Jeffers, formerly of the Washington Wizards, Utah Jazz, and San Antonio Spurs, played for Robert Morris during the 2007–08 season. Then-head coach Al Bruehl has averaged 30 wins a season during that time and has never won fewer than 25 games in his nine years at the helm of the Eagles. In 2014, the team again reached the final four of the 2014 NAIA Men's Division II Basketball Tournament.
- Men's bowling won the Men's Intercollegiate Team Championship in 2013.
- Women's bowling won the Women's Intercollegiate Team Championship in Reno, Nevada in 2014.
- Men's football began NAIA intercollegiate play in 2011 under the guidance of head coach Jared Williamson. They played at Morris Field (the old Forest View High School) in Arlington Heights, and competed in the Mideast League of the Mid-States Football Association (MSFA).
- Men's soccer began NAIA intercollegiate play in 2014, advancing to the NAIA tournament and playoffs in 2016, 2017, and 2018.
- Men's ice hockey, under the guidance of former head coach Tom "Chico" Adrahtas (CSCHL Coach-of-the-Year 2010–11 & 2011–12), played in the American Collegiate Hockey Association at the Division I level in the Central States Collegiate Hockey League (CSCHL). The teams all practiced and played at the Edge Ice Arena in Bensenville. In addition, RMU fielded teams in Chicago at the ACHA Division II and ACHA Division III levels as independent teams. Robert Morris–Springfield and Robert Morris–Peoria fielded teams at the ACHA Division III and played in the Mid-American Collegiate Hockey Association. In 2014, the RMU-Gold team played in the ACHA Men's Division I National Championship game vs. Arizona State, and finished as national runners-up.
- Women's ice hockey, under the guidance of former head coach Jennifer Wilson, played in the American Collegiate Hockey Association at the Division I level in the Central Collegiate Women's Hockey Association (CCWHA). The Lady Eagles played at the Edge Ice Arena in Bensenville. The team played a roughly 35-game schedule against ACHA Women's competition as well as games against NCAA Division I & Division III opponents. Beginning in the 2010–11 season the team joined the Central Collegiate Women's Hockey Association. The team won Women's ACHA Division I National Championships in 2005 and 2007 and were runners-up in 2006, 2008, and 2009.

=== Branch campus athletics ===
The university's branch location Robert Morris–Peoria were members of the United States Collegiate Athletic Association (USCAA). Roosevelt's Peoria campus joined the USCAA by inheriting RMU Peoria's membership in that association.

==== Robert Morris–Peoria ====
Sports included baseball and club football.

- Women's softball had much success at Robert Morris–Springfield, winning the USCAA National Championship in 2006 and 2010, reaching third place in 2007, and reaching second place in 2008 and 2009.

==== Robert Morris–Lake County ====
- Men's soccer won the USCAA National Championship in 2004 and 2007, the latter coming in a victory over fellow branch campus Robert Morris–Springfield.

== Notable alumni ==
- Tiffany Henyard, mayor of Dolton, Illinois
- Marshall Kent, professional bowler on the PBA Tour
