= Central Collegiate Women's Hockey Association =

- Conference: ACHA
- Founded: 1996
- Commissioner: Steven John "SJ" Scansaroli
- Sports fielded: Ice hockey
- Division: Women's Division I & II
- Region: Midwest and Great Lakes
- Website: http://www.ccwha.net/

The Central Collegiate Women's Hockey Association (CCWHA) is a non-profit ice hockey league for college club teams based at Midwestern United States schools. It was formed in October 1996. CCWHA is the largest women's collegeiate league in North America. All teams in the league are also required to be members of the ACHA that provides the teams with USA Hockey insurance and other member benefits.

The CCWHA was established with the goal of encouraging and improving opportunities in ice hockey for women; developing and encouraging sportsmanship among all players for the betterment of their physical and social well-being; and conducting an organized League wherein women enjoy recreational and competitive ice hockey. The CCWHA season runs from September to late February/early March with an annual tournament at the end of each season for each division. Winners of each division are awarded an automatic bid to the ACHA National tournament. All teams benefit by scheduling games against each other in the League and the recognition of the League at local and national levels.

== Current members ==
=== Division I ===
| Institution | Location | Affiliation | School Enrollment | Team Founded | Joined CCWHA | | Team Nickname |
| Institution | Location | Affiliation | School Enrollment | Team Founded | Joined League | Joined D1 | Team Nickname |
|---|---|---|---|---|---|---|---|
| Adrian College | Adrian, Michigan | Private | 1,040 | 2012 | 2012 | 2012 | Bulldogs |
| Aquinas College | Grand Rapids, Michigan | Private | 2,001 | 2015 | 2015 | 2017 | Saints |
| Davenport University | Caledonia, Michigan | Private | 12,471 | 2013 | 2013 | 2013 | Panthers |
| Eastern Michigan University | Ypsilanti, Michigan | Public | 12,663 | 2025 | 2026 | 2026 | Eagles |
| Grand Valley State University | Allendale, Michigan | Public | 23,892 | 2007 | 2007 | 2007 | Lakers |
| Indiana Tech | Fort Wayne, Indiana | Private | 6,109 | 2021 | 2021 | 2021 | Warriors |
| Lake Superior State University | Sault Ste. Marie | Public | 1,600 | 2021 | 2021 | 2023 | Lakers |
| Miami University | Oxford, Ohio | Public | 18,840 | 2010 | 2011 | 2011 | Red Hawks |
| Michigan State University | East Lansing, Michigan | Public | 46,045 | 1995 | 1996* 2007* | 1996 2007 | Spartans |
| Penn State University | University Park, Pennsylvania | Public | 40,693 | 2012 | 2020 | 2020 | Lady Ice Lions |
| University of Michigan | Ann Arbor, Michigan | Public | 40,042 | 1995 | 1996 | 1996 | Wolverines |
| University of Michigan-Dearborn | Dearborn, MI | Public | 8,005 | 2019 | 2019 | 2019 | Wolverines |

*Michigan State (D1) left the league in 2004 and rejoined at a later date.
#Roosevelt acquired Robert Morris's women's hockey team.

=== Division II ===
| Institution | Location | Affiliation | School Enrollment | Team Founded | Joined CCWHA | | Team Nickname |
| Institution | Location | Affiliation | School Enrollment | Team Founded | Joined League | Joined D2 | Team Nickname |
|---|---|---|---|---|---|---|---|
| Adrian College** (DII) | Adrian, Michigan | Private | 1,040 | 2017 | 2017 | 2017 | Bulldogs |
| Aurora University | Aurora, Illinois | Private | 6,165 | 2023 | 2023 | 2023 | Spartans |
| Bowling Green State University | Bowling Green, Ohio | Public | 20,395 | 1996 | 2020 | 2020 | Falcons |
| Central Michigan University | Mount Pleasant, Michigan | Public | 17,344 | 2008 | 2012 | 2014 | Chippewas |
| Lawrence Tech University | Southfield, Michigan | Private | 3,154 | 2022 | 2022 | 2022 | Blue Devils |
| Loyola University Chicago | Chicago, Illinois | Private | 15,068 | 2014 | 2014 | 2014 | Ramblers |
| Miami University | Oxford, Ohio | Public | 19,752 | 2010 | 2011 | 2019 | RedHawks |
| Michigan State University** (DII) | East Lansing, Michigan | Public | 46,045 | 2004 | 2004* | 2014 | Spartans |
| Northern Michigan University | Marquette, Michigan | Public | 9,400 | 2001 | 2001 | 2014 | Wildcats |
| University of Notre Dame | South Bend, Indiana | Private | 11,733 | 2000 | 2002* | 2014 | Fighting Irish |
| Sault College | Sault Ste. Marie, Ontario | Public | 4,500 | 2018 | 2019 | 2019 | Cougars |

*MSU and Notre Dame both left the league (2006 and 2004 respectively) and returned when the 2nd division was formed in 2014.

**Adrian College and Michigan State University both field a Division I and Division II team in the CCWHA and ACHA. Teams have separate coaching staffs and rosters.

== Former members ==
| Institution | Years | New Conference | Classification |
|---|---|---|---|
| University of Illinois | 1996 - 2007 | Independent | N/A |
| Lake Forest College | 1996 - 2000 | NCHA | NCAA DIII |
| Lake Superior State University | 1999 - 2001 2014 - 2016 | Ceased operations | N/A |
| Lindenwood University | 2007 - 2011 | CHA | NCAA DI |
| Oakland University | 2000 - 2005 | Ceased operations | N/A |
| University of Michigan (Flint) | 2015 - 2017 | Ceased operations | N/A |
| Robert Morris University (IL) | 2010 - 2020 | Merged with Roosevelt University | N/A |
| University of Wisconsin | 1996 - 1998 | Independent | ACHA DI |
| Western Michigan University | 1996 - 2011 | Ceased operations | N/A |

== CCWHA Championship History ==
The inaugural playoff, held at Michigan State University (Munn Ice Arena in East Lansing) in February of 1997 was the capstone of the 1996-97 CCWHA inaugural season. The eight teams that comprised the CCWHA that season included the following schools: Ohio State University, University of Michigan, Michigan State, University of Illinois, University of Wisconsin, Western Michigan University, Lake Forest College and Bowling Green State University.

=== Division I ===
| Year | Champion | Runner-up | Location |
|---|---|---|---|
| 1997 | Ohio State | Michigan | East Lansing, MI |
| 1998 | Ohio State | Western Michigan | Unknown |
| 1999 | Ohio State | Michigan State | East Lansing, MI |
| 2000 | Michigan | Western Michigan | East Lansing, MI |
| 2001 | Michigan | Western Michigan | Sault Ste. Marie, MI |
| 2002 | Michigan State | Michigan | Kalamazoo, MI |
| 2003 | Michigan State | Michigan | East Lansing, MI |
| 2004 | Oakland | Michigan State | Marquette, MI |
| 2005 | Western Michigan | Michigan | Kalkaska, MI |
| 2006 | Western Michigan | Michigan | Kalkaska, MI |
| 2007 | Ohio State | Western Michigan | Findlay, OH |
| 2008 | Lindenwood | Michigan | Findlay, OH |
| 2009 | Lindenwood | Michigan State | Kalamazoo, MI |
| 2010 | Lindenwood | Michigan State | Kalamazoo, MI |
| 2011 | Lindenwood | Grand Valley | Holland, MI |
| 2012 | Robert Morris (IL) | Michigan | Holland, MI |
| 2013 | Michigan State | Robert Morris (IL) | Flint, MI |
| 2014 | Miami | Adrian | Flint, MI |
| 2015 | Miami | Michigan | Flint, MI |
| 2016 | Grand Valley | Miami | Flint, MI |
| 2017 | Miami | Michigan State | South Bend, IN |
| 2018 | Adrian | Miami | Kalamazoo, MI |
| 2019 | Adrian | Michigan State | Kalamazoo, MI |
| 2020 | Adrian | Miami | Burton, MI |
| 2022 | Adrian | Indiana Tech | Burton, MI |
| 2023 | Adrian | Indiana Tech | Burton, MI |
| 2024 | Adrian | Indiana Tech | Burton, MI |
| 2025 | Adrian | University of Michigan-Dearborn | Livonia, MI |
| 2026 | University of Michigan-Dearborn | Indiana Tech | Dearborn, MI |

=== Division II ===
| Year | Champion | Runner-up | Location |
|---|---|---|---|
| 2015 | Michigan State | Northern Michigan | Mount Pleasant, MI |
| 2016 | Northern Michigan | Notre Dame | Flint, MI |
| 2017 | Northern Michigan | Notre Dame | South Bend, IN |
| 2018 | Loyola Chicago | Notre Dame | Kalamazoo, MI |
| 2019 | Adrian | Loyola Chicago | Kalamazoo, MI |
| 2020 | Northern Michigan | Michigan State | Burton, MI |
| 2022 | Lake Superior State | Sault College | Burton, MI |
| 2023 | Sault College | Adrian College | Burton, MI |
| 2024 | Sault College | Adrian College | Burton, MI |
| 2025 | Sault College | Central Michigan University | Livonia, MI |
| 2026 | Ohio State | Northern Michigan | Dearborn, MI |

=== CCWHA Victors ===
Totals
| Team | Titles | Years |
|---|---|---|
| Adrian | 7 | 2018, 2019, 2020, 2022, 2023, 2024, 2025 |
| Lindenwood | 4 | 2008, 2009, 2010, 2011 |
| Ohio State | 4 | 1997, 1998, 1999, 2007 |
| Michigan State | 3 | 2002, 2003, 2013 |
| Miami | 3 | 2014, 2015, 2017 |
| Northern Michigan | 3 | 2016, 2017, 2020 |
| Western Michigan | 2 | 2005, 2006 |
| Michigan | 2 | 2000, 2001 |
| Adrian (D2) | 1 | 2019 |
| Loyola Chicago | 1 | 2018 |
| Grand Valley | 1 | 2016 |
| Michigan State (D2) | 1 | 2015 |
| Robert Morris (IL) | 1 | 2012 |
| Oakland | 1 | 2004 |

== National Championships ==
CCWHA Teams have combined to win eleven national championships, including ten of the seventeen ACHA Women's Division I national championships since the ACHA began sanctioning women's hockey in 2000–01.

- Adrian College - 2024
- Miami (OH) - 2014, 2016, 2017
- Michigan State - 2003, 2011
- Lindenwood - 2008, 2009, 2010
- Robert Morris (IL) - 2005, 2007
- Western Michigan - 1997 (pre ACHA known as Women's Collegiate Club Championship)

== World University Games Selections ==
Since 2011, the American Collegiate Hockey Association has supplied players for the United States team at the World University Games women's hockey tournament, held biennially and as part of the multi-sport event for college and university student-athletes. Miami's 11 player selections (through 2017) lead the conference and are tied for the national lead, and RedHawks coach Scott Hicks has also been picked as an assistant coach on two separate occasions. Michigan State ranks next with eight player selections, although the Spartans hold the top spot in a couple key distinctions: MSU is one of just two schools nationally to have at least one player on each WUG team since 2011, and is also tied for the national lead with eight unique players who have traveled to the tournament, as none of MSU's eight picks are repeat selections.

| Year | Location | Player | School | Result |
|---|---|---|---|---|
| 2011 | Erzurum, Turkey | Vince O'Mara (asst. coach) | Lindenwood | Fourth Place |
| 2011 | Erzurum, Turkey | Cory Whitaker (asst. coach) | Grand Valley | Fourth Place |
| 2011 | Erzurum, Turkey | Allysson Arcibal | Lindenwood | Fourth Place |
| 2011 | Erzurum, Turkey | Rachel Black | Robert Morris (IL) | Fourth Place |
| 2011 | Erzurum, Turkey | Shea Crawford | Lindenwood | Fourth Place |
| 2011 | Erzurum, Turkey | Charlotte Hoium | Michigan State | Fourth Place |
| 2011 | Erzurum, Turkey | Becky Katz | Robert Morris (IL) | Fourth Place |
| 2011 | Erzurum, Turkey | Nicole Konsdorf | Lindenwood | Fourth Place |
| 2011 | Erzurum, Turkey | Shelby Kucharski | Grand Valley | Fourth Place |
| 2011 | Erzurum, Turkey | Chelsea Minnie | Grand Valley | Fourth Place |
| 2011 | Erzurum, Turkey | Emily Nelson | Michigan | Fourth Place |
| 2011 | Erzurum, Turkey | Terra Payne | Michigan State | Fourth Place |
| 2011 | Erzurum, Turkey | Samantha Redick | Lindenwood | Fourth Place |
| 2011 | Erzurum, Turkey | Ashley Rumsey | Grand Valley | Fourth Place |
| 2011 | Erzurum, Turkey | Ramey Weaver | Robert Morris (IL) | Fourth Place |
| 2011 | Erzurum, Turkey | Erica Wynn | Lindenwood | Fourth Place |
| 2011 | Erzurum, Turkey | Christina Young | Michigan State | Fourth Place |
| 2013 | Trentino, Italy | Rob Blackburn (asst. coach) | Michigan | Bronze Medal |
| 2013 | Trentino, Italy | Katie Augustine | Miami | Bronze Medal |
| 2013 | Trentino, Italy | Kalli Bates | Michigan | Bronze Medal |
| 2013 | Trentino, Italy | Jennifer Boniecki | Ohio State | Bronze Medal |
| 2013 | Trentino, Italy | Staci Burlingame | Michigan State | Bronze Medal |
| 2013 | Trentino, Italy | Kristin Griebe | Michigan | Bronze Medal |
| 2013 | Trentino, Italy | Monica Korzon | Michigan | Bronze Medal |
| 2013 | Trentino, Italy | Morgan McGrath | Miami | Bronze Medal |
| 2013 | Trentino, Italy | Jessica Merritt | Robert Morris (IL) | Bronze Medal |
| 2013 | Trentino, Italy | Andrea Stewart | Michigan State | Bronze Medal |
| 2013 | Trentino, Italy | Ramey Weaver | Robert Morris (IL) | Bronze Medal |
| 2013 | Trentino, Italy | Hayley Williams | Robert Morris (IL) | Bronze Medal |
| 2015 | Granada, Spain | Scott Hicks (asst. coach) | Miami | Fifth Place |
| 2015 | Granada, Spain | Amanda Antos | Adrian | Fifth Place |
| 2015 | Granada, Spain | Katie Augustine | Miami | Fifth Place |
| 2015 | Granada, Spain | Maria Barlow | Michigan State | Fifth Place |
| 2015 | Granada, Spain | Rachael Booth | Miami | Fifth Place |
| 2015 | Granada, Spain | Eleanor Chalifoux | Michigan | Fifth Place |
| 2015 | Granada, Spain | Monica Korzon | Michigan | Fifth Place |
| 2015 | Granada, Spain | Kaley Mooney | Miami | Fifth Place |
| 2015 | Granada, Spain | Morgan McGrath | Miami | Fifth Place |
| 2015 | Granada, Spain | Kendra Myers | Grand Valley | Fifth Place |
| 2015 | Granada, Spain | Caitlin Nosanov | Davenport | Fifth Place |
| 2015 | Granada, Spain | Corey Robison | Grand Valley | Fifth Place |
| 2015 | Granada, Spain | Hayley Williams | Miami | Fifth Place |
| 2017 | Almaty, Kazakhstan | Scott Hicks (asst. coach) | Miami | Bronze Medal |
| 2017 | Almaty, Kazakhstan | Brett Berger (asst. coach) | Adrian | Bronze Medal |
| 2017 | Almaty, Kazakhstan | Lauren Allen | Grand Valley | Bronze Medal |
| 2017 | Almaty, Kazakhstan | Katie Augustine | Miami | Bronze Medal |
| 2017 | Almaty, Kazakhstan | Rachael Booth | Miami | Bronze Medal |
| 2017 | Almaty, Kazakhstan | Sabrena Camp | Adrian | Bronze Medal |
| 2017 | Almaty, Kazakhstan | Kelsey Jaeckle | Michigan State | Bronze Medal |
| 2017 | Almaty, Kazakhstan | Britt Levasseur | Adrian | Bronze Medal |
| 2017 | Almaty, Kazakhstan | Nicole Matthews | Miami | Bronze Medal |
| 2017 | Almaty, Kazakhstan | Kendra Myers | Grand Valley | Bronze Medal |
| 2017 | Almaty, Kazakhstan | Jessie Rushing | Adrian | Bronze Medal |
| 2017 | Almaty, Kazakhstan | Alyssa Visalli | Miami | Bronze Medal |
| 2017 | Almaty, Kazakhstan | Maddie Wolsmann | Michigan State | Bronze Medal |
