= Edge Ice Arena =

Multi-purpose arena in Bensenville, Illinois

Coordinates: 41°56′48″N 87°55′32″W

Edge II Ice Arena
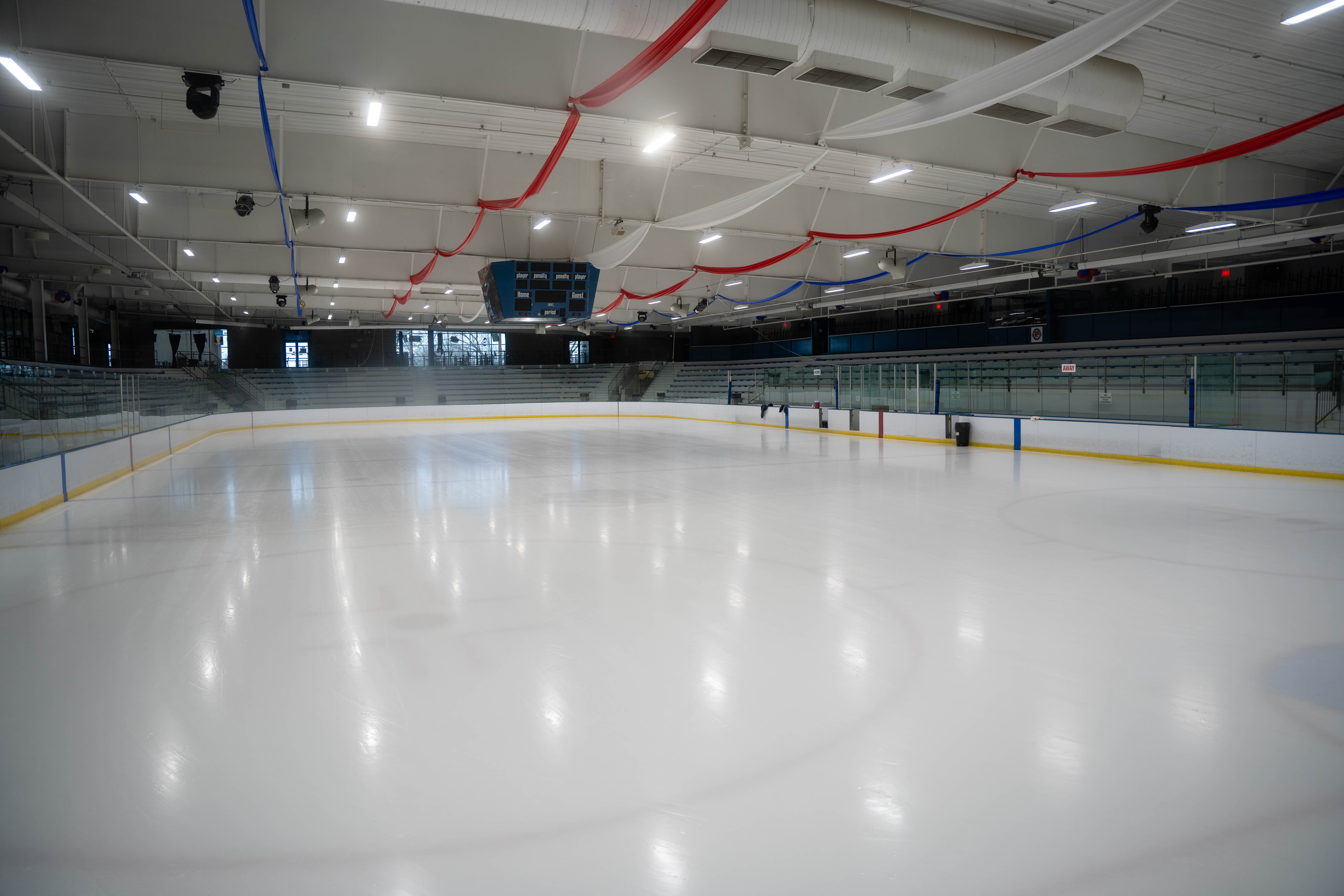
- The main rink, which is the rink for Roosevelt’s hockey program and the previous home for the Steel and Blackhawks’ practices
- Interactive map of Edge II Ice Arena
- Location: 735 East Jefferson Street; Bensenville, Illinois 60106
- Owner: Village of Bensenville
- Operator: Village of Bensenville
- Capacity: 3,000 (hockey)
- Surface: Two 200' x 85', One 200' x 90'

Construction
- Groundbreaking: April 1997
- Opened: October 1, 1997
- Cost: $2.1 million ($4.21 million in 2025 dollars)

Tenants
- Chicago Blackhawks (NHL) (former practice facility); Chiefs Hockey Club (Youth Hockey); Chicago Blues (Youth Hockey); Chicago Steel (USHL) (2000–2015); Robert Morris Eagles (ACHA) (until 2020); Roosevelt Lakers (ACHA)

The Edge Ice Arena (includes The Edge on John Street, The Water's Edge Aquatic Center, and The Edge II Ice Arena) is a 3,000-seat multi-purpose arena located in Bensenville, Illinois. It had been used as the official training facility and practice arena for the Chicago Blackhawks of the National Hockey League before the team moved to Johnny’s Ice House West in Chicago in 2010. The arena also had been used by the Chicago Steel (USHL) from 2000 to 2015, before they moved to Fox Valley Ice Arena in Geneva. The arena is currently home to the Roosevelt Lakers men's and women's college ice hockey teams competing at the ACHA Division I level. Until Roosevelt's merger with Robert Morris University Illinois in 2020, it was the home of Robert Morris Eagles ice hockey. The Edge is also home to several local high school ice hockey teams, and is used by local figure skating clubs, youth, and adult rec. ice hockey leagues (the Chicago Blues), as well as public skating.

== Facilities ==
The Edge on John Street has one 200' x 90' ice sheet. It is adjoined to The Water's Edge Aquatic Center, which includes an indoor 8-lane lap pool and 12' deep diving well. The Edge II Ice Arena has two NHL regulation-sized ice sheets. The main sheet of ice seats 2,800 fans in addition to nine luxury sky suites and an executive club level seating area.

== Special events ==
- The Edge II has been the host of four American Collegiate Hockey Association Men's Division I National Championship Tournaments in 2005, 2010, 2013 and 2016.
- The Edge II has been the host of one American Collegiate Hockey Association Women's Division I & Division II National Championship Tournament in 2008.
- In 2010 and 2011 the facility hosted those years' High School Hockey National Championship Tournaments.
- In April 2010 the facility also hosted "Ice Dreams", a 2-hour skating spectacular presented by Cuties and hosted by Dorothy Hamill. The show featured skating talent like Johnny Weir, Rachel Flatt and many more.
- The Wagon Wheel Skating Club held their annual skating competition event here from September 11–13, 2015.
