= Minot State Beavers women's ice hockey =

- University: Minot State University
- Conference: Women's Midwest College Hockey
- Governing Body: ACHA Women's Division 1
- Head coach: Ryan Miner; 3rd season, 71–11–2
- Assistant coaches: Anthony Swearingen, Vanessa Grimstad
- Captain(s): Sami Jo Henry
- Alternate captain(s): Mackenzie Balogh, Brooke Mead
- Arena: Maysa Arena; Minot, North Dakota
- Colors: Red, Black, and White

ACHA tournament appearances
- Division 1: 2020; Division 2: 2017, 2018, 2019

Minot State Beavers women's ice hockey represents Minot State University (MSU) in Women's Division 1 of the American Collegiate Hockey Association (ACHA) and in Women's Midwest College Hockey (WMCH). MSU was one of the founding members of the ACHA's second women's division in 2006–07, but has seen its greatest successes within the last few years. The Beavers qualified for the ACHA National Tournament for the first time in 2017 and made it to the semifinals, and followed that up with back-to-back runner-up finishes in 2018 and 2019. Minot then jumped to Division 1, and was one of the founding members of WMCH with Liberty University, Lindenwood University–Belleville, the University of Minnesota, McKendree University, and Midland University.

Ryan Miner is the Beavers' current head coach, as he completed his third full season behind the bench in 2019–20.

== History ==
=== Early years (2006–2016) ===
Minot State joined the ACHA for the 2006–07 season, when the association added a second women's division. Throughout the team's first ten seasons, the Beavers played primarily a regional schedule of between 10 and 15 ACHA games per season, against opponents like North Dakota State University, International Falls, Minnesota's Rainy River Community College, the University of Minnesota–Duluth, and South Dakota State University.

MSU had early stars like Kristin Bellanger and Betsy Doubek (who combined for 63 points in the 2006–07 season), Academic All-American and two-time leading scorer Chelsea Bender, and Makayla Sandvold, who also led the Beavers in scoring twice before helping to coach the team in 2015–16, but generally struggled on the ice more often than not. In an ACHA Division 2 West Region that usually included around ten teams at the time (with between two and four receiving invitations to the ACHA National Tournament, depending on the season), the Beavers never finished higher than fifth.

The team's two best shots at nationals came in 2006–07 and 2012–13. In the first of those seasons, MSU placed third in the first ranking of the year (a national ranking, as the division was not split into regions until the following season) behind the exploits of Bellanger, Doubek, and Lana Dubois. However, by mid-December, the Beavers had been passed up by Rainy River and the College of St. Scholastica and fell to fifth, where they would remain for the rest of the year, barely missing out on the four-team field. The 2012–13 campaign saw Minot come even closer, as MSU placed fourth in the West Region as late as the January 27, 2013 ranking, during a season where four teams from each of the two regions received nationals bids. However, disaster struck over the weekend of February 2 and 3, when the Beavers were swept at home by rival NDSU, thanks in large part to a four-goal series by future two-time Zoë M. Harris Award winner Kacie Johnson. In the final ranking, issued on February 13, the Bison jumped from fifth to third, pushing MSU down to fifth and out of the tournament.

=== Rise to prominence (2016–2019) ===
Jersey worn by MSU since the 2017–18 season

Throughout most of the 2016–17 season, there wasn't much to suggest that a drastic shift in the program's trajectory was on the way. A new generation of talent arrived in 2015 and 2016, including Saskatchewan natives Mackenzie Balogh and Vanessa Grimstad, along with goaltender Shelby Tornato, and supporting players like Tylar Holland and Lauren Michayluk. Even with the additions, at 5–8–1 and ranked seventh in the West Region midway through January, the season looked like most others to that point for the Beavers. However, things clicked late in the year and Minot closed on a 5–0–1 run, including two wins against Division 1's Midland to close the regular season, the second of which involved two Holland goals to rally from a 2–0 deficit, followed by Grimstad's overtime winner. The unbeaten streak was just enough to sneak up to sixth place and grab the last seed for the newly expanded ACHA National Tournament, the Beavers' first-ever appearance.

The run continued in Columbus, Ohio, as Minot became one of the tournament's major storylines by dominating fourth-seeded (and unbeaten) Miami and then Buffalo, the East Region's top team, to win Pool C and advance to the semifinals. In particular, Balogh had the first breakthrough of her career, scoring ten times during the tournament (including five goals against Buffalo) to win the Beavers' first-ever ACHA award for hockey performance, a spot on the first all-tournament team. North Dakota State once again provided a helping of heartbreak in the semifinals though, spoiling a furious MSU rally from a 3–0 third period deficit and winning 4–3 on an Erica Sevigny goal off of scrum in front of Tornato with 2:22 remaining.

Even though Minot struggled prior to the run in the late stages of 2016–17, that would not be the case for the team's remaining two seasons at the Division 2 level. In 2017–18, Ryan Miner stepped behind the bench full-time as the Beavers' head coach, after previously serving in different coaching and managerial roles while also playing for Minot's men's team and Dakota College at Bottineau. MSU added significant depth to its strong returning core (growing the roster from 13 to 22) and added stars like Sami Jo Henry, who had previously played with Balogh on the Melville Prairie Fire, and Minot High School product Bryanna Bergeron, who joined the team midway through the season. For the first time in program history, the Beavers had little issue qualifying for nationals, cruising to a 21–4–1 regular season record. After being swept by Division 1's Minnesota to open the year, not much went wrong for the Beavers, as MSU tore of 19 wins in the next 20 games – including four wins each against long-time thorn NDSU and two more sweeps of Midland. Balogh built on her freshman season by posting 33 goals and 51 points during the regular season (later adding four and 12 at the ACHA National Tournament) and was voted the Zoë M. Harris Award winner as the ACHA's player of the year. Grimstad, Henry, and Angie Lothspeich each added at least ten goals as well.

A fateful showdown series against defending national champion Lakehead University at Maysa Arena on February 10 and 11 provided a dose of foreshadowing, as the Lakers ended MSU's hot streak with a 1–1 tie in the series opener, followed by a 3–1 win the next day. Those results enabled Lakehead to sneak past Minot to win the West Region's top seed, forcing the Beavers to settle for second place.

Nevertheless, the slightly-more-difficult schedule at the 2018 ACHA National Tournament didn't seem to faze the Beavers, who once again rolled through the pool round with little issue against Pool B opponents Buffalo and Liberty, or in a crossover game against Delaware Valley Collegiate Hockey Conference champion Montclair State.

A rematch in the semifinals against North Dakota State followed, where the Beavers finally scored a measure of revenge against the team that blocked their aspirations both in 2017 and previously with a tightly fought 3–1 win to advance to the championship game. NDSU scored first, but were quickly answered by Bergeron, from Balogh's feed, before Balogh and Henry pulled MSU ahead. However, just as they had with the West Region rankings in February, Lakehead ended up on top of the ACHA thanks to a decisive 5–1 win in the championship game, the Thunderwolves' second straight title.

Early in the 2018–19 season, MSU announced that it would elevate its program to ACHA Division 1 in 2019–20, joining the Beavers men's team (which would go on to win its second national championship that year), along with a growing segment of its schedule, in a top ACHA division.

As dominant as Minot was the year before, the Beavers found another gear in their final Division 2 season – in 25 games, MSU scored 146 goals (5.84 per game) while surrendering just 38 (1.52 per game) on the way to a 24–1–0 regular season mark. They opened the year with a three-game sweep of a trip to play Division 1 teams Colorado and Colorado State, and went on to finish 9–0–0 against D1 opposition (with Midland and Minnesota standing as the other opponents), demonstrating a readiness to move to that level. The D2 portion of the schedule proceeded in a similar fashion – although Lakehead handed the Beavers their only regular season defeat in a showcase at Assiniboine on November 10, 2018, MSU took down the Thunderwolves the next day and on three other occasions over the course of the season to quickly take an iron grip on the West Region rankings. On the individual side, Balogh and Henry put up 62 and 48 points during the regular season to win All-American honors, while Grimstad, Bergeron, Haley Wickham, Beth-Ann Goudy, and Clarissa Lewis each had at least 20 points as well.

Just as they had the previous two seasons, MSU made quick work of the pool round at nationals, blowing through Rowan, Mercyhurst, and Boston College, with none of the games finishing tighter than a five-goal margin, although the latter two did remain close into the late going before the Beavers cracked them open. The semifinals, against Sherbrooke, Quebec's Bishop's University were a bit tougher, as Tornato was forced to make 14 first-period saves (en route to 27 for the game), allowing Goudy (with a pair of goals), Wickham, and Grimstad to give MSU a 4–0 lead. The Gaiters battled back to within 4–2 early in the third period, before Bergeron and Wickham popped in goals in the final 2:11 of the contest to put Minot back in the championship game.

Then, a stunner, en route to what was supposed to be a formal MSU coronation: Assiniboine pulled off one of the biggest upsets in ACHA history, denying the Beavers at the doorstep of a title for the second straight season by a 1–0 score, after Minot had gone 6–0–0 against the Cougars during the regular season, including 7–1 and 9–2 wins during its final weekend. Simone Turner-Cummer scored the game's only goal on a power play late in the first period, and ACC stymied Minot with a stout team defensive effort the rest of the way, helped along by some MSU penalty trouble and Marley Quesnel's 18 saves.

=== Elevation to ACHA Division 1 (2019–present) ===
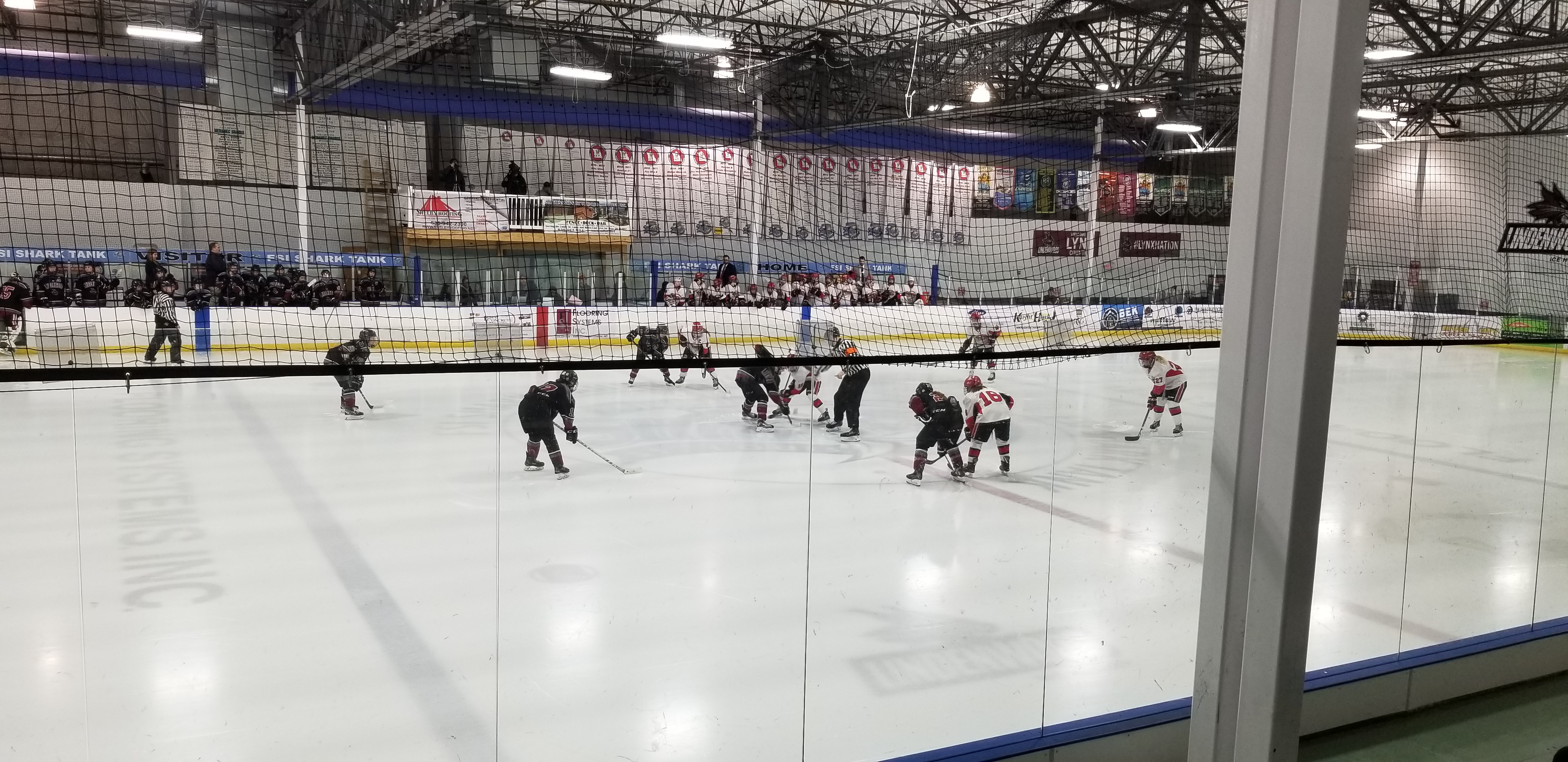
MSU defeated Lindenwood–Belleville in the semifinals of the 2020 WMCH playoffs

While Minot's ability to be competitive in D1 was never really in question thanks to a healthy selection of D1 opponents on previous schedules, another large recruiting class helped ensure that it was sustainable over an entire season. Miner plucked a pair of national champions, Lauren Blight and Mackenzie Heide, from the Assiniboine team that upset the Beavers in the 2019 D2 title game (joining ACC alumna Brooke Mead, who joined MSU in 2018). The transfer market also produced a pair of former U Sports players from the Regina Cougars in Camryn Clyne and Jensen Smigelsky, while the standouts from the true freshman class included star goaltender Jordan Ivanco, along with Maiya Aschberg, Megan Ferg, Story Navrot, and Alisha O'Hara.

As part of the move, the Beavers helped form a new conference, Women's Midwest College Hockey along with previous Western Women's Collegiate Hockey League members Minnesota and Midland, as well as fellow independents Liberty, McKendree, and Lindenwood–Belleville (although LU–B had also played in the WWCHL until 2018). The conference provided a degree of familiarity, as Minnesota and Midland had already become regular MSU opponents, although its calling card was its strength – Liberty (three times) and Minnesota had won national championships within the preceding decade, while McKendree, Lindenwood–Belleville, and Midland were newer programs that had quickly risen to contender status. Nevertheless, Minot was able to quickly prove it belonged in the group despite a 1–3–0 start, including a split at Colorado and a tightly contested sweep at the hands of LU–B that finished with Tessa O'Connor's overtime goal.

From there though, MSU fired off an 18-game unbeaten streak to take hold of second place in the Division 1's national ranking for the remainder of the season. Notable results during the run included a revenge sweep of Colorado, a 3–0 weekend against perennial powers Adrian and Miami, and a 9–0–1 mark in WMCH games, including a four-game sweep of Minnesota and three wins with a tie against Midland.

The Beavers finished the regular season 17–3–1 and were seeded second for the WMCH playoffs under a system that used the ACHA rankings to establish conference standings, in light of an unbalanced schedule. MSU grabbed its first-ever win over third-seeded Lindenwood–Belleville in the semifinals, when Ivanco posted a 27-save shutout of the powerful Lynx, and Henry's second-period goal from Balogh was just enough offense. The next day, however, top-ranked and top-seeded Liberty used an Alex Smibert goal with 17 seconds remaining to take the league title by a 2–1 count.

Despite the loss, Minot managed to hang on to their second-place ranking and were set to take on No. 7 McKendree in a best-of-three quarterfinal at the 2020 ACHA National Tournament, before the COVID-19 pandemic forced its cancellation. Henry (who was also a finalist for the Zoë M. Harris Award) and Ivanco became MSU's first two All-American selections at the Division 1 level.

== Recent season by season results ==
=== Division 1 ===
Won Championship	Lost Championship	Regular Season Conference Champions

Year	Coach	W	L	T	Conference	Conf. W	Conf. L	Conf. T	Finish	Conference Tournament	ACHA Tournament
2019–20	Ryan Miner	18	4	1	WMCH	9	2	1	2nd	Won Semifinals vs. Lindenwood–Belleville (1–0); Lost Championship vs. Liberty (1–2)	Tournament not held ^{†} Quarterfinals vs. McKendree (scheduled)

=== Division 2 ===
Year	Coach	W	L	T	Conference	Conf. W	Conf. L	Conf. T	Finish	Conference Tournament	ACHA Tournament
2018–19	Ryan Miner	28	2	0	Independent	–	–	–	–	None	Won Pool Round vs. Rowan (16–1); Won Pool Round vs. Mercyhurst (6–1); Won Pool Round vs. Boston College (5–0); Won Semifinals vs. Bishop's (6–2); Lost Championship vs. Assiniboine CC (0–1)
2017–18	Ryan Miner	25	5	1	Independent	–	–	–	–	None	Won Pool Round vs. Buffalo (7–3); Won Pool Round vs. Liberty (8–3); Won Pool Round vs. Montclair State (10–1); Won Semifinals vs. North Dakota State (3–1); Lost Championship vs. Lakehead (1–5)
2016–17	Kyle Volk	12	9	2	Independent	–	–	–	–	None	Won Pool Round vs. Miami (5–0); Won Pool Round vs. Buffalo (7–4); Lost Semifinals vs. North Dakota State (3–4)
2015–16	Makayla Sandvold; Sam Anderson	3	11	0	Independent	–	–	–	–	None	Did not qualify
2014–15	Ryan Miner; Sam Anderson	3	10	1	Independent	–	–	–	–	None	Did not qualify

^{†} The 2020 ACHA National Tournament was canceled due to the COVID-19 pandemic

== ACHA National Tournament results ==
The Beavers have qualified for the ACHA National Tournament four times across both divisions, and were the runners-up in Division 2 in both 2018 and 2019. Their combined record in all games is 10–3–0.

=== Division 1 ===
Year	Location	Seed	Round	Opponent	Results
2020	Frisco, Texas	#2	Quarterfinals	#7 McKendree	Tournament not held ^{‡}

^{‡} The 2020 ACHA National Tournament was canceled due to the COVID-19 pandemic

=== Division 2 ===
Year	Location	Seed	Round	Opponent	Results
2017	Columbus, Ohio	#6W	Pool Round; Pool Round; Semifinals	#4W Miami #1E Buffalo #3W North Dakota State	W 5–0; W 7–4; L 3–4
2018	Columbus, Ohio	#2W	Pool Round; Pool Round; Pool Round; Semifinals; Championship	#5E Buffalo #3E Liberty #6E Montclair State #4W North Dakota State #1W Lakehead	W 7–3; W 8–3; W 10–1; W 3–1; L 1–5
2019	Frisco, Texas	#1W	Pool Round; Pool Round; Pool Round; Semifinals; Championship	#6E Rowan #5E Mercyhurst #4E Boston College #1E Bishops #2W Assiniboine CC	W 16–1; W 6–1; W 5–0; W 6–2; L 0–1

== Program records ==
As of April 19, 2020.

=== Career scoring leaders ===
Name	Years	Games	Goals	Assists	Points
Mackenzie Balogh	2016–20	106	121	89	210
Vanessa Grimstad	2015–19	97	72	83	155
Sami Jo Henry	2017–present	80	67	54	121
Ashley Goudy	2006–12	63	43	28	71
Bryanna Bergeron	2017–present	66	32	34	66
Betsy Doubek	2006–09	33	33	22	55
Haley Wickham	2018–present	49	29	26	55
Beth-Ann Goudy	2016–20	84	25	26	51
Chelsea Bender	2008–12	46	30	20	50
Danielle Bakke	2006–12	66	21	29	50
Hayley Dommett	2006–10	39	23	22	45
Makayla Sandvold	2012–16	43	26	18	44
Tylar Holland	2015–18	67	15	25	40
Clarissa Lewis	2018–present	50	9	24	33
Angela Lothspeich	2014–18	57	18	14	32
Kristin Bellanger	2006–07	19	17	15	32

=== Single season scoring leaders ===
Name	Year	Games	Goals	Assists	Points
Mackenzie Balogh	2018–19	29	42	32	74
Mackenzie Balogh	2017–18	31	37	26	63
Vanessa Grimstad	2018–19	29	26	37	63
Sami Jo Henry	2018–19	29	31	23	54
Vanessa Grimstad	2017–18	31	26	23	49
Mackenzie Balogh	2016–17	23	30	17	47
Haley Wickham	2018–19	29	20	20	40
Sami Jo Henry	2017–18	29	21	18	39
Bryanna Bergeron	2018–19	29	21	16	37
Beth-Ann Goudy	2018–19	29	19	16	35
Kristin Bellanger	2006–07	19	17	15	32
Vanessa Grimstad	2016–17	23	15	17	32
Betsy Doubek	2006–07	19	22	9	31
Sami Jo Henry	2019–20	22	15	13	28
Mackenzie Balogh	2019–20	23	12	14	26
Clairssa Lewis	2018–19	29	8	18	26
Lana Dubois	2006–07	16	12	13	25
Chelsea Bender	2009–10	16	13	10	23
Alisha O'Hara	2019–20	20	12	10	22
Ashley Goudy	2009–10	16	12	9	21

=== Notable goaltenders ===
Name	Years	Minutes	Saves	Save Pct.	GAA	Shutouts
Shelby Tornato	2016–20	4754.42	1984	0.927	1.97	14
Kayla Wakelin	2012–16	1970.32	614	0.862	2.98	0
Paige Hollinger	2011–13	1069.37	567	0.917	2.86	4
Jordan Ivanco	2019–present	914.18	349	0.946	1.31	6
Casey Ritzer	2009–10	728.58	312	0.819	5.68	1
Katie Lothspeich	2008–11	691.54	354	0.833	6.16	0
Holly Jones	2015–16	543.87	221	0.850	4.30	0
Kristina Mader	2008–09, 10-11	530.42	411	0.909	4.64	0
Jadin Flexhaug	2017–19	515.59	141	0.916	1.51	3

^ Goaltending statistics were not accurately tracked prior to 2008–09

== ACHA ranking history ==
=== ACHA Division 1 ===
By the time Minot State joined Division 1 in 2019–20, the rankings consisted of an entirely computer-based system, with a weekly release on Tuesdays following weekends with games (after each team in the division had generated a sufficient amount of data). After automatic bids are awarded to three D1 conference champions (the Eastern Collegiate Women's Hockey League champion does not receive an automatic bid), the remainder of the eight-team ACHA National Tournament is determined by the final ranking of the season.

Year	Ranking																	
Year	Pre	1	2	3	4	5	6	7	8	9	10	11	12	13	14	15	16	17
2019–20		4	4	4	4	4	2	2	2	2	2	2	2					

=== ACHA Division 2 ===
With the exception of Division 2's first season (which featured a "national" ranking, as all members at the time were relatively clustered geographically), the rankings during Minot's time in the division included separate rankings for the East Region and the West Region. ACHA National Tournament bids were extended based on placement within the region, with the top two (2007–08 through 2008–09), three (2009–10 through 2011–12), four (2012–13 through 2015–16), or six (2016–17 through 2018–19) earning invitations. Rankings were primarily compiled by a ranking committee until 2018–19, when a full computer ranking was introduced.

Year	Ranking							
Year	1	2	3	4	5	6	7	8
2006–07	3	5	5	5				
2007–08	Data not available							
2008–09	7W	7W	7W	7W				
2009–10	6W	6W	6W	6W				
2010–11	8W	7W	7W	7W				
2011–12	7W	7W	6W	5W				
2012–13	6W	4W	4W	5W				
2013–14	4W	9W	8W	8W				
2014–15	9W	10W	10W	9W				
2015–16	9W	10W	11W	11W				
2016–17	6W	7W	6W	6W				
2017–18	3W	2W	1W	2W				
2018–19	2W	1W	1W	1W	1W	1W	1W	1W

== ACHA national honors ==
=== Annual awards ===
Awards earned through the 2018–19 season came in ACHA Division 2, those subsequent to that year came in ACHA Division 1. Academic All-Americans include data from 2009–10 through 2011–12, 2016–17 through 2017–18, and 2019–20.

Zoë M. Harris Award

- Mackenzie Balogh – 2017–18

First Team All-American

- Mackenzie Balogh – 2017–18, 2018–19
- Shelby Tornato – 2017–18
- Sami Jo Henry – 2019–20
- Jordan Ivanco – 2019–20

Second Team All-American

- Vanessa Grimstad – 2017–18
- Sami Jo Henry – 2018–19

First Team All-Tournament

- Mackenzie Balogh – 2016–17
- Vanessa Grimstad – 2017–18, 2018–19
- Sami Jo Henry – 2017–18
- Shelby Tornato – 2017–18

Second Team All-Tournament

- Mackenzie Balogh – 2018–19
- Shelby Tornato – 2018–19

Academic All-American

- Hayley Domett – 2009–10
- Kristina Roed – 2009–10, 2010–11
- Chelsea Bender – 2010–11, 2011–12
- Kristina Mader – 2010–11
- Cassie McLeod – 2010–11, 2011–12
- Gabriela Dolinski – 2011–12
- Kim Taylor – 2011–12

Academic All-American (continued)

- Kendall Becker – 2016–17, 2017–18
- Vanessa Grimstad – 2016–17, 2017–18
- Cassidy McGree – 2016–17, 2017–18
- Kennedy Manning – 2017–18
- Lauren Michayluk – 2017–18
- Gabi Wigness – 2017–18
- Mackenzie Balogh – 2019–20
- Sami Jo Henry – 2019–20
- Brooke Mead – 2019–20
- Shelby Tornato – 2019–20

== Conference honors ==
=== Annual awards ===
First Team All-WMCH

- Sami Jo Henry – 2019–20
- Jordan Ivanco – 2019–20

Second Team All-WMCH

- Mackenzie Balogh – 2019–20

First Team All-WMCH Tournament

- Mackenzie Balogh – 2019–20
- Jordan Ivanco – 2019–20
- Brooke Mead – 2019–20

Second Team All-WMCH Tournament

- Sami Jo Henry – 2019–20

=== Monthly awards ===
WMCH Player of the Month

- Sami Jo Henry – January 2020

WMCH Rookie of the Month

- Alisha O'Hara – November 2019
- Jordan Ivanco – January 2020

== Rivalries ==
=== Midland ===
In a sense, Minot and Midland have grown up together, as the Warriors began play at the ACHA Division 1 level in the 2014–15 season, right before MSU found its stride. The teams met for the first time on November 20 and 21, 2015, splitting a series in Fremont, Nebraska. In the first game, Bradi Sveet (two goals), Makayla Sandvold (one goal, two assists), and Kendall Becker (two goals, one assist) played central roles in running the Beavers out to a 4–0 lead in an eventual 6–2 win. Warriors coach Taylor Gross rallied her team for a 5–3 win the next day however, and Midland also earned a sweep later in the year at Maysa Arena, capped off by Malia Shimabukuro's overtime goal.

While the two schools aren't near each other in any objective sense – they're 634 miles apart by car or bus – Midland is nevertheless among MSU's closest opponents, particularly at the ACHA Division 1 level, and MU always has rostered a healthy contingent from both North Dakota and South Dakota. The two teams, largely as a result of those things, have enjoyed a frequently-played, and often-heated, rivalry. In 2016–17, Midland fell victim to the Beavers' late-season hot streak in their push for nationals, as MSU earned a home sweep in the only meetings of the year, thanks to Vanessa Grimstad's overtime goal to finish a come-from-behind effort in the second game. That series decisively flipped things in MSU's favor; the Beavers swept all four meetings in both 2017–18 and 2018–19, even as Midland became a successful team, posting a winning record for the first time in 2017–18 and taking the Western Women's Collegiate Hockey League title (along with a first-ever bid to the ACHA National Tournament) in 2019.

While the games from 2015 through 2019 generally meant little outside of bragging rights with the teams in different ACHA divisions, that changed in 2019–20 when the Beavers moved to Division 1 and joined Midland as a founding member of WMCH to formalize a rivalry that had already grown organically.

Minot leads the all-time series 14–3–1, as of the end of the 2019–20 season.

=== North Dakota State ===
The series between the in–state rivals dates to the earliest days of ACHA Division 2, when the Bison were MSU's second ACHA opponent, and continued throughout the Beavers' time in the division – the teams met at least 53 times between 2006–07 and 2018–19.

Both teams have had periods at or near the top of D2, as NDSU qualified for the ACHA National Tournament in each of Minot State's last seven seasons at that level, winning a national championship in 2015 and making four other trips to the semifinals. The Bisons' first bid to nationals, in 2013, came largely at MSU's expense. The Beavers were ranked fourth in the West Region late in the season – good enough for the region's last invitation – headed into a showdown series with No. 5 NDSU. While the first game was close, the Beavers were done in by goals from all three Johnsons on the Bison (Kacie, Jackie, and Brittany) in a 3–1 defeat. After NDSU finished the sweep with a 7–1 rout the next day, they leaped over MSU in the rankings to, essentially, take Minot's bid.

In 2017, 2018, and 2019, MSU and NDSU each qualified for nationals, with the first two of those tournaments resulting in head-to-head meetings in the semifinals. The Bison ended Minot's Cinderella run of 2017 when Erica Sevigny delivered a 4–3 NDSU win with 2:22 left, after a goal by Angie Lothspeich and two by Mackenzie Balogh had erased a 3–0 third-period lead. MSU exacted revenge in 2018, advancing to the program's first national championship game with a 3–1 victory, offsetting an early Rachel Dorff goal with markers from Balogh, Bryanna Bergeron, and Sami Jo Henry, along with 18 Shelby Tornato saves.

With Minot's move to ACHA Division 1 while NDSU remains in Division 2, the rivalry is likely to diminish in importance, as the teams did not play during a season for the first time ever in 2019–20. In games played since 2014–15, the series is tied 11–11–1, although Minot has won the last nine meetings.

== Players ==
=== Current roster ===
As of April 18, 2020.

No.	Nat.	Player	Class	Pos	Height	DoB	Hometown	Previous team
2		Madie Olson	Freshman	D	5' 6" (1.68 m)	2001-00-00	Minot, North Dakota	New England Hockey Club (JWHL)
6		Sarah Martin	Freshman	D	5' 8" (1.73 m)	2001-06-06	Vermilion, Alberta	Northern Alberta Xtreme (CSSHL)
7		Denali Sigurdson	Freshman	D	5' 4" (1.63 m)		Riverton, Manitoba	Interlake Lightning (MFMHL)
8		Lauren Blight	Junior	F	5' 6" (1.68 m)	1999-11-02	Oakville, Manitoba	Assiniboine Community College (ACHA)
9		Ensley Fendelet	Freshman	F	5' 3" (1.6 m)	2001-01-29	Saskatoon, Saskatchewan	Battlefords Sharks (SFMAAAHL)
10		Sami Jo Henry (C)	Junior	F	5' 6" (1.68 m)	1999-08-26	Balgonie, Saskatchewan	Melville Prairie Fire (SFMAAAHL)
11		Megan Ferg	Freshman	F	5' 7" (1.7 m)	2001-00-00	Portage la Prairie, Manitoba	Central Plains Capitals (MFMHL)
12		Jensen Smigelsky	Junior	F	5' 7" (1.7 m)	1999-05-07	White City, Saskatchewan	University of Regina (USports)
14		Haley Wickham	Sophomore	F	5' 7" (1.7 m)		Waskada, Manitoba	Westman Wildcats (MFMHL)
15		Mackenzie Balogh (A)	Senior	F	5' 3" (1.6 m)	1998-04-08	Kipling, Saskatchewan	Melville Prairie Fire (SFMAAAHL)
16		Camryn Clyne	Sophomore	F	5' 1" (1.55 m)		Boissevain, Manitoba	University of Regina (USports)
19		Brooke Mead (A)	Senior	D	5' 6" (1.68 m)	1998-12-03	Regina, Saskatchewan	Assiniboine Community College (ACHA)
21		Bryanna Bergeron	Junior	F	5' 8" (1.73 m)	1998-08-04	Minot, North Dakota	Minot High School (USHS–ND)
27		Clarissa Lewis	Sophomore	D	5' 4" (1.63 m)	2000-00-00	Sherwood Park, Alberta	Edmonton Pandas (AFHL MAAA)
29		Jordan Ivanco	Freshman	G	5' 5" (1.65 m)	2000-10-05	Saskatoon, Saskatchewan	Saskatoon Stars (SFMAAAHL)
31		Shelby Tornato	Senior	G	5' 6" (1.68 m)	1998-08-23	Saskatoon, Saskatchewan	Battlefords Sharks (SFMAAAHL)
33		Lexi Beuker	Freshman	G	5' 6" (1.68 m)	2001-09-21	Melfort, Saskatchewan	Prince Albert Bears (SFMAAAHL)
40		Cassidy Entz	Sophomore	D	5' 5" (1.65 m)	2000-03-10	Churchbridge, Saskatchewan	Melville Prairie Fire (SFMAAAHL)
61		Maiya Aschberg	Freshman	F	5' 5" (1.65 m)	2001-05-12	Morden, Manitoba	Pembina Valley Hawks (MFMHL)
67		Mackenzie Heide	Junior	D	5' 9" (1.75 m)	1999-01-29	Morden, Manitoba	Assiniboine Community College (ACHA)
74		Story Navrot	Freshman	F	5' 7" (1.7 m)	2001-05-31	Warman, Saskatchewan	Banff Hockey Academy (CSSHL)
77		Alisha O'Hara	Freshman	F	5' 2" (1.57 m)	2001-01-03	Chater, Manitoba	Westman Wildcats (MFMHL)

== Media ==
- Minot Daily News – The primary daily newspaper for Minot and much of northern North Dakota provides regular coverage of MSU women's hockey and includes a beat reporter covering Beavers athletics, high school sports, and the Minot Minotauros.
- Red and Green – Minot State's bi-weekly student newspaper offers frequent coverage of the team.
- KX Television/KXMC-TV – Minot's CBS affiliate often features Beavers hockey through features and game recaps.
- Prostyle Production – PSP provides game streaming services and also conducts in-depth interviews with Minot players and coaches.

== See also ==
- American Collegiate Hockey Association
- Women's Midwest College Hockey
- Maysa Arena
- Minot State Beavers men's ice hockey
- Minot State University
