= Regier =

Regier is a surname. Notable people with the surname include:

- Alexander Regier, Professor of English
- Darcy Regier (born 1956), Canadian ice hockey player
- Erhart Regier (1916-1976), Canadian politician
- Jason Regier (born 1975), American paralympic wheelchair rugby player
- Jerry Regier (born 1945), American businessman and politician
- Keith Regier, American politician
- Matt Regier, American politician
- Steve Regier (born 1984), Canadian ice hockey player
- Wade Regier (born 1983), Canadian ice hockey coach
