= Women's Midwest College Hockey =

- Conference: ACHA
- Founded: 2019
- Commissioner: Jason White
- Sports fielded: Ice Hockey
- Division: Women's Division 1
- No. of teams: 7
- Region: Midwest, Mid-Atlantic

Locations

Women's Midwest College Hockey (WMCH) is an American Collegiate Hockey Association Women's Division 1 club level hockey-only college athletic conference for women's hockey teams. It is one of four ACHA Women's Division 1 conferences, along with the Central Collegiate Women's Hockey Association, Eastern Collegiate Women's Hockey League, and Western Women's Collegiate Hockey League. The league features seven of the top ACHA programs from across the country regardless of geographic considerations, with its membership ranging from Lynchburg, Virginia in the southeast to Minot, North Dakota in the northwest.

WMCH began play during the 2019–20 season with teams that had won four of the last seven national championships (Minnesota in 2013, Liberty in 2015, 2018, and 2019), and each of its members had participated in their respective national tournaments within the past two seasons (Minot State did so in Division 2, the rest in Division 1). The conference lived up to that billing by earning four of the eight available bids to the 2020 ACHA National Tournament, before it was canceled due to the COVID-19 pandemic.

== Current membership ==
Institution	Location	Nickname	Founded	Type	Enrollment	Colors	Primary Facility
Liberty University	Lynchburg, Virginia	Flames	1971	Private (Baptist)	15,000 (residential)	Blue, White and Red	LaHaye Ice Center
Maryville University	St. Louis, Missouri	Saints	1872	Private	4,609	Red, Black and White	Maryville University Hockey Center
Lindenwood University	St. Charles, Missouri	Lions	1827	Private	7,465	Black and Gold	Centene Community Ice Center
McKendree University	Lebanon, Illinois	Bearcats	1828	Private (Methodist)	2,499	Purple and White	McKendree Metro Rec Plex
Midland University	Fremont, Nebraska	Warriors	1883	Private (Lutheran)	1,400	Orange and Blue	Sidner Ice Arena
University of Minnesota	Minneapolis, Minnesota	Golden Gophers	1851	Public	47,783	Maroon and Gold	Mariucci Arena
Minot State University	Minot, North Dakota	Beavers	1913	Public	3,560	Red, Green and Black	Maysa Arena

== Playoff championship game results ==
The WMCH championship trophy

Year	Champion	Score	Runner-Up	Location
2020	Liberty	2–1	Minot State	St. Louis, Missouri

=== Regular season champions ===
- 2019–20 Liberty^{†}

^{†} The WMCH did not formally declare a regular season champion. Liberty was the top-seeded team for the league playoffs due to having the highest ACHA ranking of the members.

== ACHA National Tournament appearances ==
Appearances made while a WMCH member.

School	Appearances	Years	Championships
Liberty	1	2020	None
Lindenwood–Belleville	1	2020	None
McKendree	1	2020	None
Minot State	1	2020	None

== See also ==
- American Collegiate Hockey Association
- Lindenwood–Belleville Lynx women's ice hockey
- Minot State Beavers women's ice hockey
- List of ice hockey leagues
