= Bob Hunskor =

American politician

Member of the North Dakota House of Representatives from the 6th district
- Incumbent
- Assumed office 2001

Personal details
- Born: Robert Leroy Hunskor; November 2, 1932 (age 93) North Dakota, United States
- Party: Democratic-NPL
- Spouse: Irma Mettler (Widowed)
- Profession: Public schools employee

Robert Leroy Hunskor (born November 2, 1932) is an American politician in the state of North Dakota. He is a member of the North Dakota House of Representatives, representing the 6th district. A Democrat, he was first elected in 2000.

== Early life and education ==
He graduated from Newburg High School in 1948. He is an alumnus of Minot State College and former public school employee and coach in Newburg, North Dakota. He also served in the United States Army from 1954 to 1956.
