= Lisa Wolf =

American politician

Member of the North Dakota House of Representatives from the 3rd district
- In office 2007 - 2010

Personal details
- Party: North Dakota Democratic-NPL Party
- Spouse: Robert
- Education: Minot State University
- Profession: educator

Lisa Wolf is a former North Dakota Democratic-NPL Party member of the North Dakota House of Representatives, representing the 3rd district (2007–2010).
