= Sean Ortiz =

Canadian football player (born 1985)

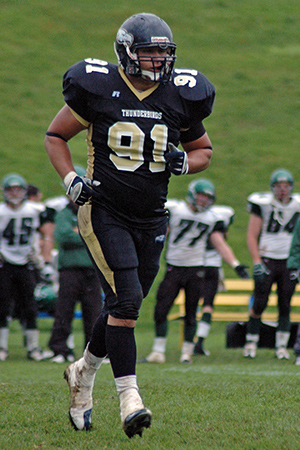
- Ortiz with the UBC Thunderbirds

No. 55
- Positions: Defensive lineman, Long snapper

Personal information
- Born: April 5, 1985 (age 41); White Rock, British Columbia
- Listed height: 6 ft 2 in (1.88 m)
- Listed weight: 239 lb (108 kg)

Career information
- College: British Columbia; Minot State
- CFL draft: 2008: undrafted

Career history
- 2008: Toronto Argonauts*
- 2009: Montreal Alouettes*
- 2010: BC Lions
- 2011: Montreal Alouettes
- 2011: Hamilton Tiger-Cats
- 2012: BC Lions
- * Offseason or practice squad member only
- Stats at CFL.ca

Sean Ortiz (born April 5, 1985) is a Canadian former professional football defensive lineman who played in the Canadian Football League. He originally signed with the Toronto Argonauts as an undrafted free agent in 2010. In his current tenure with the BC Lions, he signed with the team on March 9, 2012. He was released by the Lions on June 24, 2012. He played CIS football for the UBC Thunderbirds and college football for the Minot State Beavers.
