= Midwest College Hockey =

College athletic conference

- Conference: American Collegiate Hockey Association (ACHA)
- Founded: November 8, 2018
- Sports fielded: Ice hockey
- Division: Division I
- No. of teams: 8
- Headquarters: Oklahoma City, OK
- Region: Midwest
- Official website: https://www.midwestcollegehockey.com/

Midwest College Hockey (MCH) is a Division I ACHA level hockey-college athletic conference. The conference was announced on November 8, 2018, and started play with the 2019–20 season.

== Members ==
=== Current members ===
- University of Jamestown - joined in 2022
- University of Mary - joined in 2023
- Midland University - founding member
- Minot State University - joined in 2024
- Waldorf University - founding member
- Iowa State University - joined in 2024
- McKendree University - founding member

=== Former members ===
- Maryville University - founding member; left in 2022
- Lindenwood University-Belleville - founding member; men's ice hockey program shuttered after 2018–19 season, thus the school never participated in the league
- University of Illinois - (2024–2025)
- Illinois State University - founding member; left in 2025
- Northern Illinois University - founding member; left in 2025
