= Wade Regier =

Personal information
- Born: 16 March 1983 (age 42); Saskatoon, Saskatchewan, Canada

Sport
- Sport: Ice hockey
- Team: Saskatoon Chiefs
- Now coaching: Minot State Beavers men's ice hockey (2010–2021)

Wade Regier (born March 16, 1983) is a Canadian former ice hockey player, who served as the head coach of the Minot State Beavers men's ice hockey of the ACHA Division 1 from 2010 to 2021. He was named ACHA Coach-of-the-Year in 2013 and 2017

== Playing career ==
Before coaching at Minot State University, Regier played three seasons with the Saskatoon Chiefs of the North Saskatchewan Junior B Hockey League. Regier then moved on to Minot State and played for the Beavers from 2004 to 2008. Regier was also selected to the first ever ACHA All-Star hosted by Penn State University.

== Coaching career ==
Regier began his coaching career as an assistant under Sheldon Schneider from 2008 to 2010. Wade was named the 5th coach in team history in 2010.

Regier resigned as the head coach of the Minot State hockey program on April 29, 2021.
