= Lindenwood–Belleville Lynx women's ice hockey =

- University: Lindenwood University – Belleville
- Conference: Women's Midwest College Hockey
- Governing Body: ACHA Women's Division 1
- Head coach: Andrew Miller; 1st season, 28–6–0
- Assistant coaches: Kaitlyn Johnson
- Captain(s): Lindsay Gillis, Alicia Williams
- Alternate captain(s): Jamie Riselay, Kate Tihema, Jessica Walker
- Arena: FSI Shark Tank; Belleville, Illinois
- Colors: Maroon, Black, and White

ACHA tournament appearances
- 2016, 2017, 2018, 2019, 2020

Conference tournament champions
- WWCHL: 2016

Conference regular season champions
- WWCHL: 2016, 2017, 2018 (East Division)

The Lindenwood–Belleville Lynx women's ice hockey team represented Lindenwood University – Belleville (LU–B or LU–Belleville) in Women's Division 1 of the American Collegiate Hockey Association (ACHA) and in Women's Midwest College Hockey (WMCH), following a successful stint in the Western Women's Collegiate Hockey League (WWCHL). The team was founded for the 2014–15 season, as part of a rapid expansion of LU–B's athletic department, and quickly became one of the ACHA's top programs. The Lynx claimed three regular season conference championships and one playoff title (all in the WWCHL), and qualified for five ACHA National Tournaments, highlighted by a second-place finish in 2019.

== History ==
=== 2014–15 ===
Lindenwood–Belleville announced the addition of women's (and men's) hockey on November 25, 2013, with the program scheduled to begin play during the 2014–15 season. The nearly-one-year lead time paid large dividends, as first coach and director of hockey operations Craig Buntenbach landed a 15-player freshman class that helped ensure the team's immediate competitiveness. The diverse inaugural group included future stars like Americans Ashley Dietmeier and Alexandra Brown, Canadians Blake Fuller, Maddy Millar and Jessica Moon, and New Zealand's Firth Bidois. Jaylene Anderson and Delaney Peters, both of whom came over from perennial ACHA Division 2 contender Rainy River Community College, provided an immediate veteran presence, while big Alaskan Alahna Stivers joined the roster late in the season.

For much of the year, things proceeded in a better-than-expected fashion for a first-year team, as the Lynx generally struggled against the ACHA's better teams but managed to reel off wins against most others. The first games in program history were 10–1 and 12–1 thrashings at defending national champion Miami, but LU–B recovered to sweep its first home games against Wisconsin at the Ice Zone the following weekend.

The Lynx entered the ACHA rankings for the first time in the November 23rd edition of the poll, checking in at 14th, a position the team would hold for the remainder of the season. Lindenwood–Belleville was 11–8–1 at the time of the ranking and were coming off of a pair of closer–than–expected losses to national title contender Adrian.

By late January, LU–B's record was 15–11–1, although four of the wins came against non-ACHA team Iowa, four others were over fellow first-year team Midland, and two more involved ACHA Division 2's Iowa State as the opponent. There wasn't a ton of indication as to what would come next: the Lynx collecting their first-ever signature victory, stunning No. 2 Liberty by a 2–1 count at the Ice Zone on January 30. Stivers (who was playing her first game with the team) answered an early goal by the Flames' Carrie Jickling on the power play, while Anderson buried the winner late in the third period on Dietmeier's assist. Bidois also starred, making 35 saves to negate a shot count of 36–8 in LU's favor.

LU–Belleville finished the regular season well, winning three of four after the Liberty series, including arguably their second-biggest win of the year, over 12th-ranked Robert Morris (IL). The Lynx wound up third in the WWCHL standings behind Colorado State and Minnesota, an appropriate-enough position given their 0–4–0 record against the Rams and Gophers and their 10–0–0 mark against all other conference teams. That extreme stratification held in the WWCHL playoffs, held in Sun Prairie, Wisconsin, where LU–B won a first-round game with Colorado but dropped a semifinal to Minnesota before recovering to close out the year with a third-place-game win over Wisconsin. The Colorado game was among the most dramatic wins in early team history, as Moon scored the 3–2 contest's winner with four seconds remaining. Millar assisted on the decider to cap a three-point outing, including a goal to tie things up midway through the third period.

Dietmeier (44 points) and Fuller (43) both ended the year among the ACHA's top ten scorers.

=== 2015–16 ===
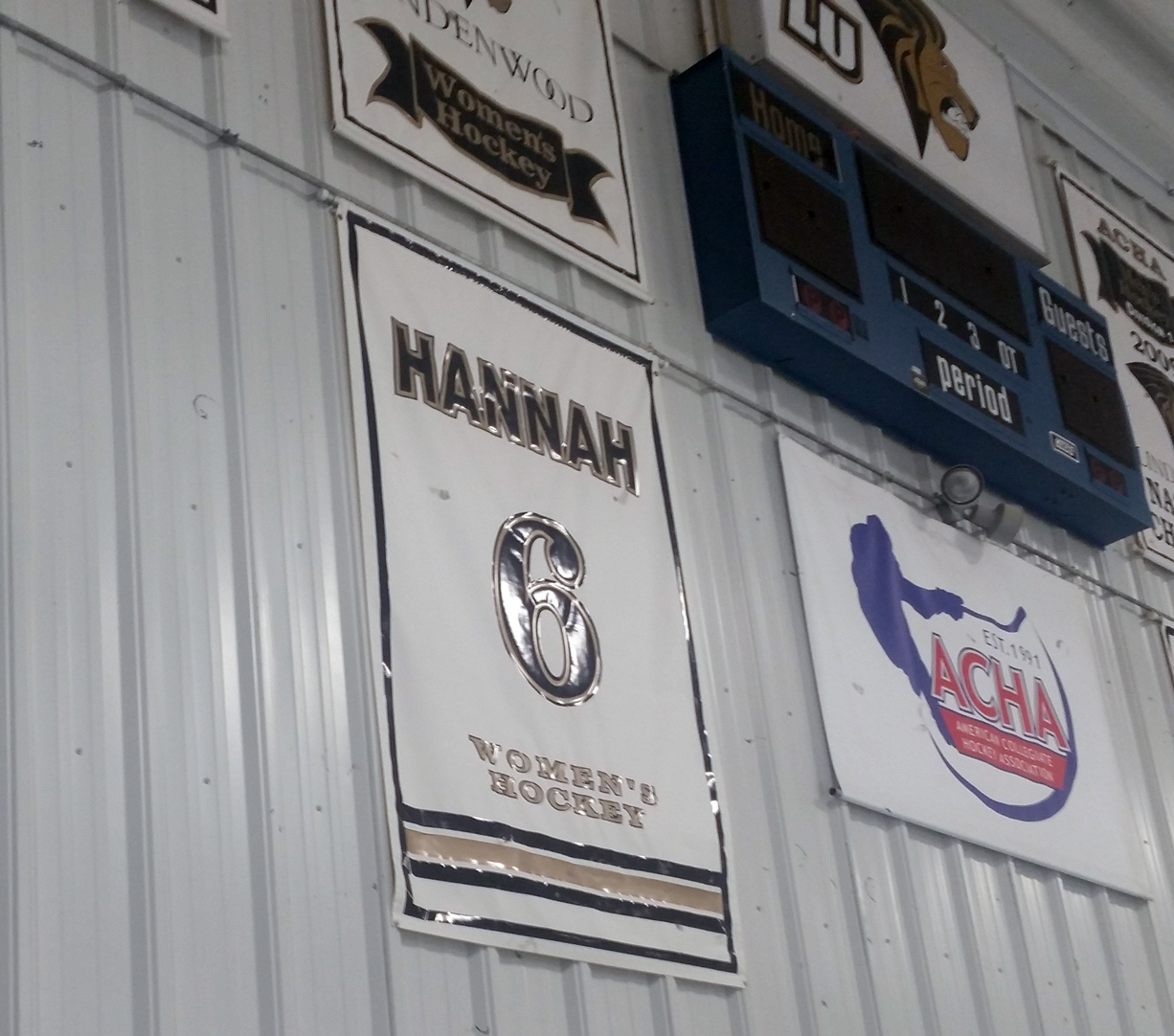
Lynx head coach Katherine Hannah had her number retired by the Lindenwood Lady Lions program

Lindenwood–Belleville's second season started with a bang, as the team hired Katherine Hannah as its new head coach. Hannah, a native of Toronto, Ontario, is one of the most decorated athletes in the history of Lindenwood University's St. Charles, Missouri campus and ACHA women's hockey. She began her career with the Lindenwood Lady Lions ice hockey team as it was being established in 2003–04, playing through 2007–08. In her five seasons, she was the ACHA's Zoë M. Harris Player of the Year twice (one of only two players to win the award multiple times), a five-time All-American, helped the Lady Lions to the 2006 and 2008 ACHA national championships and rolled up a whopping 407 career points. She was a 2013 inductee to the Lindenwood Sports Hall of Fame, while a banner with her number 6 hangs in the Lions' home Lindenwood Ice Arena. Hannah had been coaching at Simsbury High School before making her way back to the Lindenwood system.

Hannah's tenure could not have started better, as the Lynx bolted out to an early 9–0–0 record and jumped from 14th in the rankings (LU–B began 2015–16 exactly where it closed 2014–15) all the way up to eighth - in position to receive an invitation to the ACHA National Tournament - by the end of October. The schedule stiffened from that point, but the squad acquitted itself well. In what could be characterized as the first truly pivotal series in program history, pitting teams battling for league titles and nationals bids against each other, the Lynx battled to a pair of come-from-ahead home ties with tenth-ranked Minnesota on November 7 and 8. Fuller and Stivers scored in each end of the series. A number of tight non-conference results followed to further bolster LU–B's ranking: 2–1 and 3–1 losses to No. 3 Adrian, a 3–2 loss to subsequent No. 3 Miami (in stark contrast to the first games in team history), and a 4–2 victory over No. 4 Grand Valley State on January 24, behind two Dietmeier goals and 47 Bidois saves.

Back in the WWCHL, the Lynx found themselves as league frontrunners by late in the season, with the ties against Minnesota the only blemishes on their conference record. The Gophers, meanwhile, along with usual contenders Colorado and Colorado State, had all taken losses along the way. LU–B's shutout win over the Buffaloes on third-period goals by Stivers, Dietmeier and NCAA Division III transfer Hayley Winker at the end of January clinched the WWCHL regular season championship, the first conference title in program history.

Despite entering the league playoffs in Boulder, Colorado as the top seed, the Lynx were instantly humbled by a staggering 7–0 loss to host Colorado to open things up. Fortunately for LU–B, a new pool-based playoff format offered a respite, and the team bounced back that evening to defeat Midland and advance to the semifinals. The standard airtight 60 minutes between the Lynx and Gophers followed, with LU–B getting the final word in the season series and holding on late for a 3–2 victory on the strength of goals by Winker, Fuller and Nikole Day. The redemption story was completed with a 2–1 championship game victory over the Buffaloes to win both the league title and an autobid to the ACHA National Tournament. The win largely owed itself to 36 saves by Bidois, who was named MVP of the playoffs, while Stivers and Katie Lakusta joined her on the first all-tournament team.

As the sixth seed entering nationals, Lindenwood–Belleville was thrown in a four-team pool with plenty of familiarity in the form of top-seeded Liberty and No. 3 Grand Valley State, with a new opponent, No. 8 Michigan, mixed in. However, the Lynx saw a quick end to their title hopes after dropping results to the Lakers and Flames. Despite the loss and elimination, the meeting with Liberty stood as one of the most exciting games of the tournament. The defending national champs took a 3–1 lead in the second period on a Jickling natural hat trick, but Winker and Fuller struck to get LU–B back even early in the third period. Liberty then took leads of 4–3 and 6–4, but a resilient Lynx squad had quick answers by Dietmeier and Haley Hill. The six-goal third period ended one shy on the LU–Belleville side though, as the Flames held on for a 6–5 win. The Lynx did manage to close out their time at the tourney on a high note, rallying from a 4–1 hole after one period to pick up a stirring 6–4 win over Michigan, the program's first ever at ACHAs.

=== 2016–17 ===
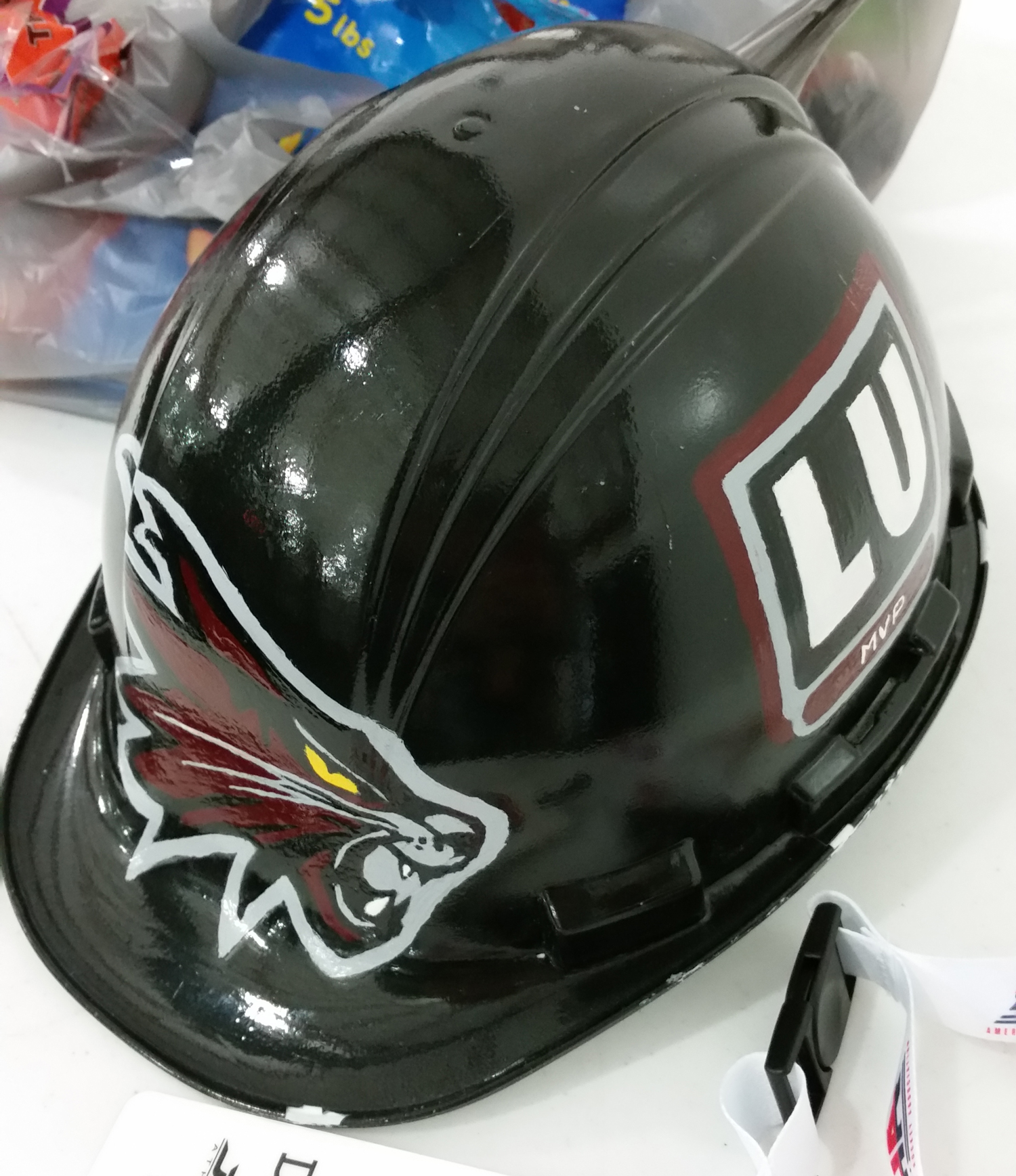
LU–B awards a hard hat to the MVP of each game in the locker room

With 2015–16 marking Lindenwood–Belleville's transition from "new" to "contender," the 2016–17 campaign presented its fair share of expectations, although its schedule proved difficult in more than one way. The Lynx went 9–5–2 over the first half of the season, a solid record made even more impressive by the fact that eight of the 16 contests came against No. 1 Miami, No. 7 Grand Valley State, No. 8 Colorado and No. 1 Liberty. While LU–B mostly struggled in those outings with a 1–5–2 record, the win was a huge one: a come-from-behind 4–2 result at Liberty on December 3, the Flames' first ACHA loss at their home LaHaye Ice Center since Rhode Island upended LU on November 16, 2014 (the unbeaten stretch spanned 20 games). Liberty jumped out to an early 2–0 lead, but the Lynx surged over the second and third periods behind goals from Stivers, Dietmeier, Fuller and Millar. That victory, combined with the closeness of the losses against top teams, allowed LU–B to remain sturdy in the rankings, as they never dropped below eighth during the year.

On February 18, 2017, the Lynx participated in USA Hockey's National Continuous Game, held in conjunction with the IIHF Girls' Global Game. The Girls' Global Game involved 44 national federations worldwide hosting one-hour games in succession over the weekend of February 17 through 19th, while the concurrent USA Hockey event spotlighted girls' and women's hockey at different levels on American soil. LU-B won their segment of the National Continuous Game by a 2–1 count at Minnesota on a pair of Fuller goals. The win, coupled with a victory against Wisconsin later that night, clinched LU–Belleville's second straight WWCHL regular season title.

The National Continuous Game was part of an extremely dense scheduling stretch linking the end of the regular season and the WWCHL playoffs, beginning with a three-game sweep of Colorado State from February 10 through 12th. The subsequent weekend in Minnesota included four games over three days with the Gophers and Badgers, while the playoffs also included four games in three days - a grand total of 11 games over 17 days between February 10 and 26. That reality, arguably, took its toll on the Lynx at playoffs, with a disappointing (in light of the three consecutive regular season or playoff titles to that point) third-place finish following a 5–1 loss to Colorado in the semifinals.

Nevertheless, in contrast to previous seasons, LU–B had built up enough status nationally to survive the blow and qualify for the ACHA National Tournament in Columbus, Ohio by finishing fifth in the rankings (three spots ahead of WWCHL playoff champion Minnesota, as things turned out) and drawing a pairing with No. 4 Massachusetts for a best-of-three quarterfinal, under a new tournament format. Things started well enough for the Lynx, as the Minutemen had to forfeit game one of the series thanks to Winter Storm Stella and related travel difficulties. UMass, however, showed up for games two and three both literally and figuratively, and managed to flip the series in their favor and advance to the semifinals with 7–3 and 4–2 wins. Alicia Williams, a freshman from Minnesota, scored twice at nationals, while Megan Lugar grabbed a second team all-tournament nod.

=== 2017–18 ===
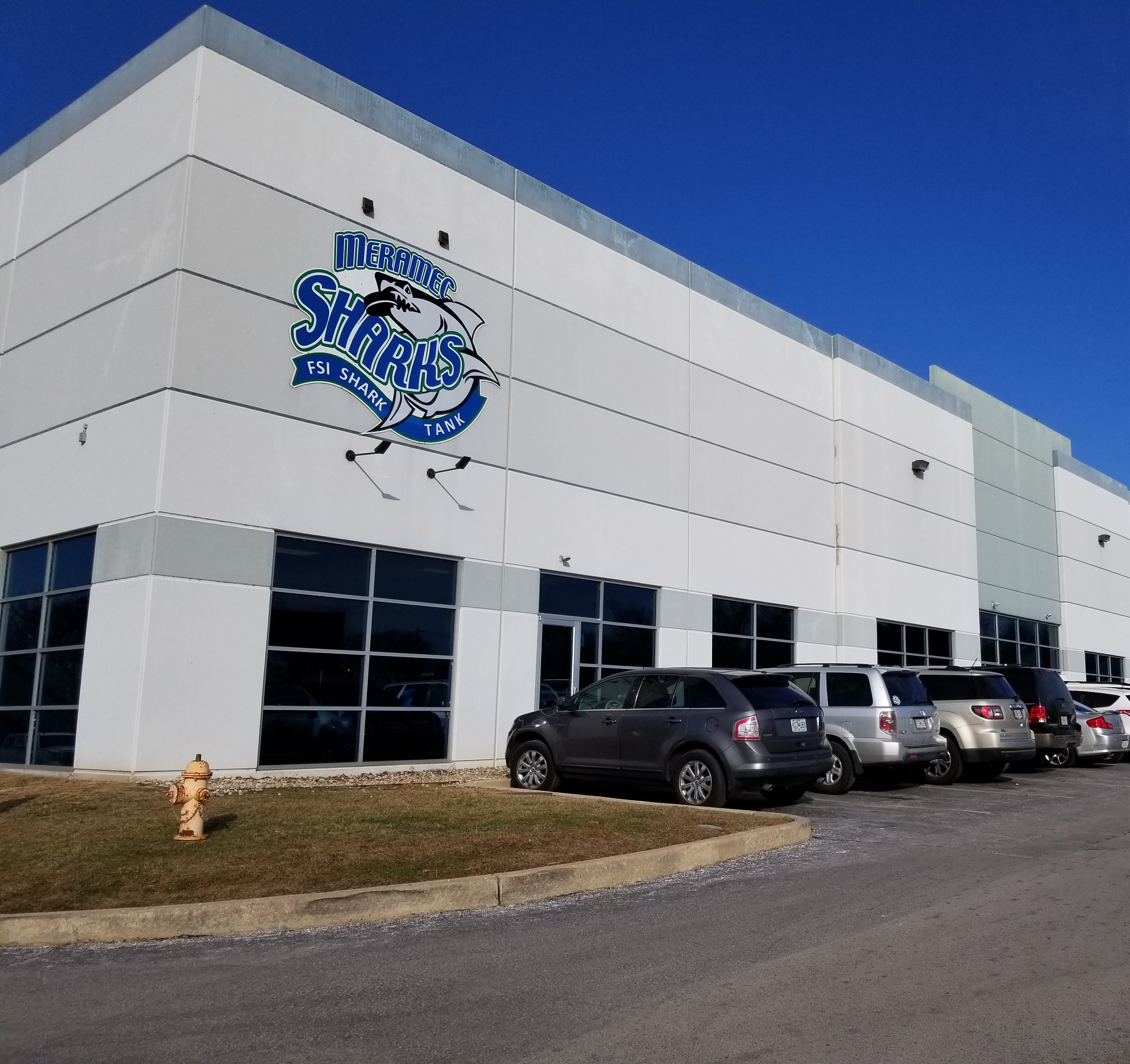
The FSI Shark Tank in St. Louis, LU–B's home rink for most of the team's history

LU–B returned nearly its entire squad for 2017–18 and looked to build off of its successes in 2016–17 and its growing footprint in the ACHA picture. An 8–3–0 start (with two of the three losses to perennial contender Liberty) seemed to be a step in that direction, but an even bigger one came on November 17, 2017, when the Lynx beat two-time defending national champion Miami at Goggin Ice Center by a 3–1 score. Michelle Coonan made 33 saves to keep the potent RedHawks at bay, while Michaela Read both opened and closed the scoring, and Kate Tihema also added a third-period marker. The victory (even after settling for a split the next day) helped stabilize the Lynx as a top-eight team for the duration of the season. Three weeks later, the Lynx began an eight-game unbeaten steak that ran for a full two months, from December 8, 2017, through February 9, 2018. The last game of the stretch was a 4–3 victory over No. 2 Adrian. Tanya Candido (who would end up transferring to Adrian after the season) scored twice on the power play in the last 12 minutes of the third period to help LU–B rally from a 3–1 deficit before Fuller won it in overtime.

Entering the WWCHL playoffs as co-favorites (after the conference moved to a divisional format), the Lynx looked the part through the pool stage of the tournament, defeating Arizona State 3–0 before a 13–1 demolition of hosting Midland that saw 14 different LU–Belleville skaters collect points, including hat tricks by Millar and Kate Tihema. However, for the second straight season, the Lynx were bounced from the conference semifinals by Colorado, as Maura Kieft's second-period power play goal provided the margin in a 2–1 contest.

The disappointment continued at the ACHA National Tournament when an LU–B team that seemed ready to take another step forward instead ended up in the same place as the year before, after they were quickly swept out of the quarterfinals by Miami.

=== 2018–19 ===
Change came to the program in a few different ways during the 2018–19 season. It marked the departure of a massive senior class, many of whom had been the team's stars since its inception, including Fuller, Millar, Stivers, Winker, and Brown. Additionally, the Lynx left the WWCHL after four seasons and played the campaign as an independent team.

The new generation of Lynx was highlighted by an outstanding freshman class, including goalie Hannah Stone, blueliners Tessa O'Connor, Jessica Walker, and Mackenzie Drost, along with big center Dakota McAlpine. Sophomores like Read, Marissa Delry, and Lindsay Gillis took on an increasing role, while Dietmeier, Williams, Lugar, Katie Stelling, and Jamie Riselay remained to bridge the gap between the two groups.

On the way to a 19–4–3 regular season record, the Lynx achieved their highest ranking yet, jumping to the third position after a sweep of Massachusetts, Robert Morris, and McKendree to win the championship of the Robert Morris Showcase. Late in the season, they took down a top-ranked team for the second time in program history (following the 2016–17 win over Liberty) by beating Adrian, which had entered the game at 20–0–1. Gillis connected on the power play with just 3:33 remaining, and Stone's 23-save shutout did the rest in a 1–0 win.

The 2019 ACHA National Tournament in Frisco, Texas saw the Lynx finally break through the quarterfinal round for the first time, although it wasn't easy. Sixth-seeded Grand Valley State used 38 Lauren Allen saves to stun LU–B by a 4–3 count in the opening game of the best-of-three series, before the Lynx blasted the Lakers 10–2 in game two behind a five-point game from Gillis and four by Williams. The deciding contest then saw GVSU rally with two third-period goals to force overtime, but Dietmeier ended things quickly in the extra period to survive the upset bid and advance to the semifinals. The semifinal round, surprisingly, would prove less stressful, as LU–B jumped out to a 4–0 lead on second-seeded Adrian into the last ten minutes of the game before the Bulldogs found the net twice in the late going, one of those coming with 30 seconds remaining. Dietmeier, Gillis, and McAlpine starred in the game, with each scoring and adding at least one assist. LU–Belleville would fall one win short of the national championship though, as Liberty won their second straight title, 5–2.

Gillis, Dietmeier, and McAlpine were named to the first All-Tournament team, while Gillis and Stone were both first team All-Americans, in what would be LU–B's biggest ACHA postseason awards haul.

=== 2019–20 ===
LU–B started a new conference, the WMCH, with five other powerhouse programs in 2019–20

The early part of the 2019 offseason brought the disastrous news of the cessation of Lindenwood–Belleville's athletic program due to Lindenwood's system-wide restructuring, making 2019–20 the Lynx's final season. To make matters worse, Hannah resigned in the aftermath of the decision, and Andrew Miller eventually took over to steer the team through the campaign.

If the Lynx could have been considered a lame duck, they hardly showed it through their play, as LU–B boasted a 28–6–0 overall record against one of the nation's toughest schedules. Lindenwood–Belleville, along with five other top programs (Liberty, McKendree, Midland, Minnesota, and Minot State), formed a new ACHA conference, Women's Midwest College Hockey (WMCH). All six WMCH teams would go on to finish in the ACHA's top ten, but the Lynx nevertheless managed a 12–2–0 record within the league. The obvious highlight of those games was a 2–1–0 mark against Liberty, the two-time defending national champions that had, of course, defeated LU–B in the 2019 title game. On September 29, 2019, the Lynx rallied for a split with the Flames with a 4–1 victory behind goals by Williams, Gillis, McAlpine, and Sydney Spicer. LU–Belleville also defeated Liberty on November 8, 2019, while defending their title at the Robert Morris Showcase in Chicago. LU–B also played six other games against teams that would finish in the top ten, going 3–3–0 in those contests.

While the Lynx were largely led by the same core that came on board in 2016–17 and 2017–18, one key addition was Megan Norris, a rookie from Innisfil, Ontario. Norris scored 25 times (including a tear of 17 over her last 13 games) to finish second in ACHA Division 1 goal scoring, highlighted by a four-goal performance at WMCH playoffs to collect first team all-tournament honors. Veterans Williams and Gillis – the team's captains in 2019–20 – enjoyed their typically productive seasons and were both All-WMCH and All-American selections.

Lindenwood–Belleville hosted the inaugural WMCH playoffs at the FSI Shark Tank and opened up with a thorough 6–0 first round defeat of Midland, highlighted by a Norris hat trick. However, LU–B dropped from title contention the next day when Minot State took a 1–0 win in the semifinals, avenging a pair of early-season wins by the Lynx. The team did manage to bounce back to win the consolation game against McKendree, completing a perfect 6–0–0 record against their St. Louis-area rivals.

Despite the disappointment of the WMCH loss, the Lynx easily qualified for the ACHA National Tournament for the fifth straight time and were set to take on sixth-seeded Michigan State in the quarterfinals until the COVID-19 pandemic forced the tournament's cancellation, leaving an ambiguous conclusion to the program's existence.

== Season-by-season results ==
Won Championship	Lost Championship	Regular Season Conference Champions

Year	Coach	W	L	T	Conference	Conf. W	Conf. L	Conf. T	Finish	Conference Tournament	ACHA Tournament
2019–20	Andrew Miller	28	6	0	WMCH	12	2	0	3rd	Won First Round vs. Midland (6–0); Lost Semifinals vs. Minot State (0–1); Won Third Place vs. McKendree (4–0)	Tournament not held ^{‡} Quarterfinals vs. Michigan State (scheduled)
2018–19	Katherine Hannah	22	6	3	Independent	–	–	–	–	None	Won Quarterfinals vs. Grand Valley State (3–4, 10–2, 3–2 OT); Won Semifinals vs. Adrian (4–2); Lost Championship vs. Liberty (2–5)
2017–18	Katherine Hannah	22	9	1	WWCHL	10	2	0	1st East Div.	Won Pool Round vs. Arizona State (3–0); Won Pool Round vs. Midland (13–1); Lost Semifinals vs. Colorado (1–2)	Lost Quarterfinals vs. Miami (1–2, 2–8)
2016–17	Katherine Hannah	23	10	3	WWCHL	15	1	2	1st	Won Pool Round vs. Colorado State (9–1); Won Pool Round vs. Arizona State (4–0); Lost Semifinals vs. Colorado (1–5); Won Third Place vs. Colorado State (5–0)	Lost Quarterfinals vs. Massachusetts (1–0 Forfeit, 3–7, 2–4)
2015–16	Katherine Hannah	19	8	2	WWCHL	6	0	2	1st	Lost Pool Round vs. Colorado (0–7); Won Pool Round vs. Midland (4–0); Won Semifinals vs. Minnesota (3–2); Won Championship vs. Colorado (2–1)	Lost Pool Round vs. Grand Valley State (2–3); Lost Pool Round vs. Liberty (5–6); Won Pool Round vs. Michigan (6–4)
2014–15	Craig Buntenbach	21	14	1	WWCHL	10	4	0	3rd	Won First Round vs. Colorado (3–2); Lost Semifinals vs. Minnesota (1–3); Won Third Place vs. Wisconsin (5–3)	Did not qualify

^{‡} The 2020 ACHA National Tournament was canceled due to the COVID-19 pandemic

== ACHA National Tournament results ==
The Lynx qualified for the ACHA National Tournament five times with a combined record of 5–8–0.

Year	Location	Seed	Round	Opponent	Results
2016	Kalamazoo, Michigan	#6	Pool Round; Pool Round; Pool Round	#3 Grand Valley State #1 Liberty #8 Michigan	L 2–3; L 5–6; W 6–4
2017	Columbus, Ohio	#5	Quarterfinals (G1); Quarterfinals (G2); Quarterfinals (G3)	#4 Massachusetts #4 Massachusetts #4 Massachusetts	W 1–0 Forfeit; L 3–7; L 2–4
2018	Columbus, Ohio	#5	Quarterfinals (G1); Quarterfinals (G2); Quarterfinals (G3)	#4 Miami #4 Miami	L 1–2; L 2–8
2019	Frisco, Texas	#3	Quarterfinals (G1); Quarterfinals (G2); Quarterfinals (G3); Semifinals; Championship	#6 Grand Valley State #6 Grand Valley State #6 Grand Valley State #2 Adrian #1 Liberty	L 3–4; W 10–2; W 3–2 OT; W 4–2; L 2–5
2020	Frisco, Texas	#3	Quarterfinals	#6 Michigan State	Tournament not held ^{‡}

^{‡} The 2020 ACHA National Tournament was canceled due to the COVID-19 pandemic

== Program records ==
=== Career scoring leaders ===
Name	Years	Games	Goals	Assists	Points
Ashley Dietmeier	2014–19	158	98	68	166
Blake Fuller	2014–18	121	82	47	129
Alicia Williams	2016–20	127	64	54	118
Maddy Millar	2014–18	119	44	65	109
Alahna Stivers	2014–18	104	48	54	102
Lindsay Gillis	2017–20	93	32	63	95
Marissa Delry	2017–20	95	38	52	90
Katie Stelling	2016–20	110	32	40	72
Hayley Winker	2015–18	93	32	32	64
Michaela Read	2017–20	91	33	30	63
Jamie Riselay	2016–20	127	10	45	55
Kate Tihema	2016–20	129	20	33	53
Dakota McAlpine	2018–20	61	20	26	46
Jaylene Anderson	2014–17	87	17	21	38
Megan Norris	2019–20	33	25	11	36

=== Single season scoring leaders ===
Name	Year	Games	Goals	Assists	Points
Ashley Dietmeier	2014–15	32	29	15	44
Blake Fuller	2014–15	30	27	16	43
Alicia Williams	2018–19	30	24	18	42
Blake Fuller	2016–17	35	25	14	39
Alicia Williams	2019–20	33	19	18	37
Megan Norris	2019–20	33	25	11	36
Marissa Delry	2019–20	34	15	21	36
Maddy Millar	2014–15	30	13	23	36
Alahna Stivers	2017–18	31	13	22	35
Lindsay Gillis	2019–20	32	9	26	35
Ashley Dietmeier	2016–17	36	17	16	33
Ashley Dietmeier	2018–19	31	21	11	32
Alahna Stivers	2015–16	28	17	15	32
Lindsay Gillis	2018–19	31	14	18	32
Alahna Stivers	2016–17	36	14	17	31

=== Notable goaltenders ===
Name	Years	Minutes	Saves	Save Pct.	GAA	Shutouts
Firth Bidois	2014–17	4527.53	1956	0.914	2.44	11
Hannah Stone	2018–20	2953.40	996	0.943	1.22	20
Michelle Coonan	2016–19	2371.23	727	0.914	1.72	10
Libbey Breaker	2015–19	533.25	145	0.879	2.25	0
Maia Busi	2019–20	364.15	85	0.914	1.32	1
Emily McDonald	2018–20	282.87	73	0.961	0.64	1

== ACHA ranking history ==
The top eight teams in the final ACHA ranking of the season receive an invitation to the ACHA National Tournament. Rankings were issued quarterly (with a preseason ranking) in 2014–15 and 2015–16. Beginning with the 2016–17 season, the ACHA tabulated rankings each week during the season and issued them on Tuesdays following weekends including games, with the preseason ranking discontinued in 2018–19 when the ACHA switched to an entirely computer-based ranking.

Year	Ranking																	
Year	Pre	1	2	3	4	5	6	7	8	9	10	11	12	13	14	15	16	17
2014–15	RV	RV	14	14	14													
2015–16	14	8	7	6	6													
2016–17	5	5	4	4	4	6	8	7	7	7	6	7	6	5	6	5	5	5
2017–18	4	4	4	4	4	7	6	6	6	6	6	6	6	5	4	4	5	5
2018–19		6	5	6	3	3	3	3	3	3	3	3	3	3	3			
2019–20		2	2	2	2	2	3	3	3	3	3	3	3					

== ACHA national honors ==
=== Annual awards ===
Coach of the Year

- Katherine Hannah - 2015–16

First Team All-American

- Lindsay Gillis - 2018–19, 2019–20
- Hannah Stone - 2018–19

Second Team All-American

- Lindsay Gillis - 2017–18
- Alicia Williams - 2019–20

First Team All-Tournament

- Ashley Dietmeier - 2018–19
- Lindsay Gillis - 2018–19
- Dakota McAlpine - 2018–19

Second Team All-Tournament

- Hayley Winker - 2015–16
- Megan Lugar - 2016–17

Academic All-American

- Hayley Winker - 2016–17, 2017–18
- Jessica Moon - 2016–17, 2017–18
- Amber Repke - 2016–17, 2017–18
- Paige Young - 2016–17, 2017–18
- Megan Lugar - 2016–17, 2017–18
- Ashley Dietmeier - 2017–18, 2018–19
- Abby Flaherty - 2017–18
- Katie Lakusta - 2017–18, 2018–19
- Jamie Riselay - 2019–20

=== Monthly awards ===
During the 2013–14, 2014–15 and 2015–16 seasons, the ACHA presented a series of monthly awards for both men's and women's divisions.

Sher-Wood Freshman Spotlight
- Ashley Dietmeier - December 2014

== Conference honors ==
Includes WWCHL all-tournament for 2014–15, 2015–16 and 2017–18, WWCHL all-conference for 2016–17 and 2017–18, WMCH all-tournament for 2019–20, and WMCH all-conference for 2019–20. LUB played as an independent during the 2018–19 season.

WWCHL Tournament MVP

- Firth Bidois - 2015–16

First Team All-WMCH

- Lindsay Gillis - 2019–20
- Alicia Williams - 2019–20

First Team All-WWCHL

- Blake Fuller - 2016–17
- Firth Bidois - 2016–17
- Lindsay Gillis - 2017–18
- Alahna Stivers - 2017–18

Second Team All-WWCHL

- Alex Brown - 2016–17
- Ashley Dietmeier - 2016–17

First Team All-WMCH Tournament

- Megan Norris - 2019–20

First Team All-WWCHL Tournament

- Jessica Moon - 2014–15
- Alahna Stivers - 2015–16
- Katie Lakusta - 2015–16

Second Team All-WMCH Tournament

- Dakota McAlpine - 2019–20
- Hannah Stone - 2019–20
- Jessica Walker - 2019–20

Second Team All-WWCHL Tournament

- Blake Fuller - 2014–15

== International players ==
=== IIHF World Championships ===
Three LU–Belleville players have been selections for the senior national teams of their home countries during the IIHF World Women's Championships, including Michelle Coonan and Kate Tihema for Australia and Firth Bidois for New Zealand. During the LU–B players' national team careers, both Australia and New Zealand have occupied either Division IIA or IIB, the fourth and fifth divisions under the IIHF system.

Australia has swung between those two divisions during Tihema's and Coonan's national team careers. In 2016, Australia won promotion to Division IIA through winning Division IIB. The victory came in dramatic fashion, as Australia dropped its opener to Mexico in a shootout, then recovered to win four straight, edging out Spain by a single point. Both players starred, with Tihema's four goals tied for seventh tournament-wide (two came in a victory over Spain, a crucial result given the standings margin), and Coonan ranking among the goaltending leaders with a 1.62 goals against average and a 0.886 save percentage. In 2020, Tihema was the team's alternate captain as it again won promotion, blowing through the field with a +35 goal differential over five games and only facing one serious challenge (a 2–1 win over Turkey in the second game, on February 24). She collected one goal and four assists during the run, including a player-of-the-game effort in the tournament-clinching win over rival New Zealand. Due to the COVID-19 pandemic-forced cancellations of most 2020 IIHF tournaments and the Division IIB tournament's unusually-early dates, Australia wound up as the winner of the highest IIHF division contested in 2020.

Australia has been on the other side of things too, however. During the first world championships for both Tihema and Coonan in 2014, Australia was relegated from Division IIA. The Aussies also finished sixth in Division IIA in 2017, immediately after the promotion success of 2016, but were fortunate to be spared relegation, as no teams were relegated during the 2017 and 2018 tournaments to allow the top division to expand from eight to ten teams. In 2018, Australia improved two places to fourth in Division IIA, the best overall finish of both players' senior national careers. Coonan started four of Australia's five games and was named the team's best player of the tournament by the participating coaches, while Tihema scored twice in the Mighty Jills' final game, a win over Slovenia in what was a de facto 4th/5th place contest. That success was followed by a disastrous 2019 tournament that saw Australia swept by the field and relegated back to Division IIB.

Tihema has scored 11 times, with seven assists, in 35 total games at worlds while Coonan has appeared in 22 contests.

Bidois was a member of New Zealand's 2015 world championships team that was relegated from Division IIA, notably forming a goaltending tandem with Grace Harrison, who joined St. Lawrence's NCAA Division I team that fall and became the first hockey player from New Zealand to earn an NCAA scholarship.

Player	Year	Division	Location	Result
(Australia) Michelle Coonan	2014	IIA	Asiago, Italy	Sixth Place^{‡} (26th overall)
(Australia) Michelle Coonan	2015	IIB	Jaca, Spain	Fifth Place (31st overall)
(Australia) Michelle Coonan	2016	IIB	Jaca, Spain	First Place^{†} (27th overall)
(Australia) Michelle Coonan	2017	IIA	Gangneung, South Korea	Sixth Place (26th overall)
(Australia) Michelle Coonan	2018	IIA	Maribor, Slovenia	Fourth Place (24th overall)
(Australia) Michelle Coonan	2019	IIA	(United Kingdom) Dumfries, Great Britain	Sixth Place^{‡} (28th overall)
(Australia) Kate Tihema	2014	IIA	Asiago, Italy	Sixth Place^{‡} (26th overall)
(Australia) Kate Tihema	2015	IIB	Jaca, Spain	Fifth Place (31st overall)
(Australia) Kate Tihema	2016	IIB	Jaca, Spain	First Place^{†} (27th overall)
(Australia) Kate Tihema	2017	IIA	Gangneung, South Korea	Sixth Place (26th overall)
(Australia) Kate Tihema	2018	IIA	Maribor, Slovenia	Fourth Place (24th overall)
(Australia) Kate Tihema	2019	IIA	(United Kingdom) Dumfries, Great Britain	Sixth Place^{‡} (28th overall)
(Australia) Kate Tihema	2020	IIB	Akureyri, Iceland	First Place^{†}
(New Zealand) Firth Bidois	2015	IIA	(United Kingdom) Dumfries, Great Britain	Sixth Place^{‡} (26th overall)

† Promoted
‡ Relegated

=== World University Games ===
Since 2011, the ACHA has supplied players for the U.S. National University Select Women's Team, which competes at the World University Games women's hockey tournament, held biennially and as part of the multi-sport event for college and university student-athletes.

LU–Belleville had two players selected for an evaluation camp in preparation for the 2017 edition of the team, Alex Brown and Ashley Dietmeier. Brown went on to make the final roster, and helped Team USA to the bronze medal, just the second won by any American team (men's or women's) in the modern era. The defenseman appeared in all four games during the tournament, and picked up a key assist of a Kendra Myers goal in a 3–2 win over Japan that allowed the U.S. to advance to the semifinals. Overall, Brown totaled four penalty minutes and a plus-1 rating.

In 2019, LU–B had three players selected for Team USA, including Hannah Stone, Katie Stelling, and Alicia Williams. While that version of the team was unable to repeat 2017's podium finish, losing in overtime to Japan in the bronze medal game, Stone was one of the tournament's best goaltenders. Most significantly, her 56-save effort helped hold heavily favored Canada to a 1–0 victory in the round robin stage of the tournament. Stone also logged 41 and 39-save efforts in two games against Japan, the latter effort coming in the third place game.

Player	Year	Location	Result
(United States) Alexandra Brown	2017	Almaty, Kazakhstan	Bronze Medal
(United States) Katie Stelling	2019	Krasnoyarsk, Russia	Fourth Place
(United States) Hannah Stone	2019	Krasnoyarsk, Russia	Fourth Place
(United States) Alicia Williams	2019	Krasnoyarsk, Russia	Fourth Place

=== World Deaf Ice Hockey Championships ===
In April 2017, Lynx goalie Libbey Breaker competed for Team USA in the World Deaf Ice Hockey Championships (WDIHC) in Amherst, New York. The 2017 iteration of the WDIHC was the third edition of the tournament overall, but the first including women's teams. Breaker and the Americans played two games against Canada, dropping both by 6–4 and 6–3 scores. Despite the high-scoring nature of the contests, Breaker, Team USA's only goalie, was excellent in making 36 saves during the latter game to take her team's player of the game honors. She totaled 41 stops in the first match.

Player	Year	Location	Result
(United States) Libbey Breaker	2017	Amherst, United States	0–2–0 record

=== Other tournaments ===
In addition to their turns at the World Women's Championships, Coonan and Tihema have both represented Australia in other IIHF tournaments. Tihema played in the 2016 U18 World Championships, however her team did not fare well, losing all three of its group round contests. Tihema, for her part, scored twice against Great Britain (what would turn out to be the Mighty Jills' only tallies of the round robin) and was named Australia's player of the game. Australia did close things out on a high note, topping Romania in a shootout to take seventh place.

Both Tihema and Coonan participated in the 2014 Challenge Cup of Asia, although the Mighty Jills struggled that time out as well, dropping three pool games and then an overtime decision to South Korea for the bronze medal.

Player	Year	Tournament	Division	Location	Result
(Australia) Michelle Coonan	2014	IIHF Challenge Cup of Asia	Top	Harbin, China	Fourth Place
(Australia) Kate Tihema	2014	IIHF Challenge Cup of Asia	Top	Harbin, China	Fourth Place
(Australia) Kate Tihema	2016	IIHF World U18 Championship	IQ	Radenthein, Austria	Seventh Place (21st overall)

== Rivalries ==
=== Colorado ===
Although the rivalry ended after the Lynx left the WWCHL following the 2017–18 season, for most of the teams' shared time in the conference, Colorado was the biggest hurdle for LU–B.

The series had a rather tame beginning, as Lindenwood–Belleville won its first five times out against a rebuilding Colorado program. However, things heated up quickly beginning with the 2016 WWCHL playoffs, when Elle Dice scored twice and CU blasted LU–B 7–0 in the pool round opener for their first win ever against the Lynx. That result eventually helped set up a championship game rematch, with LU–Belleville getting revenge by a 2–1 count to win the program's first league playoff title. Colorado got more than its share of revenge, however. In 2016–17, the Buffs won in a rout (5–1) to eliminate the favored Lynx from the WWCHL semifinals, on the heels of the Buffs taking the regular season series with a win and a tie. Colorado also defeated LU–Belleville in the 2018 WWCHL semifinals by a 2–1 count, on the way to winning the league title. Renee Dreher and Maura Kieft scored the CU goals in what turned out to be the final game between the teams.

The Lynx won the all-time series 6–5–1, but Colorado took five of the last seven meetings, with one tie.

=== Minnesota ===
Before Colorado moved into contention, Lindenwood–Belleville and Minnesota were the WWCHL's two best programs. The two combined for every league playoff title and five of the six when including the regular season between 2014 and 2017, also sharing all four of the conference's ACHA National Tournament bids during that time.

While the Lynx and Gophers never met directly for the conference title, they did split a pair of WWCHL semifinal meetings. In 2015, Jess Nkhata, Melissa Drown and Sonja Stojic all scored as Minnesota downed LU–B en route to an eventual title. The next year, the Lynx returned the favor with a 3–2 victory on the way to their own championship.

Both teams eventually left the WWCHL and joined WMCH for the 2019–20 season, where the Lynx swept the regular season series between the teams. In all, LU–B won the all-time series 7–4–3.

=== Liberty ===
The Flames were among the ACHA's best teams throughout the existence of the Lynx program, winning national championships in 2015, 2018, and 2019, but LU–B proved to be one of the few teams capable of consistently giving Liberty a hard time.

The signature game between the teams was the 2019 ACHA championship game, won 5–2 by Liberty to end LU–B's most successful title run one step short. The Flames also took their only other meeting with the Lynx at nationals, fending off an upset-minded LU–B team at the 2016 tournament, surviving an explosive third period in the process, by a 6–5 score.

On the other side, LU–B has earned two of the most important wins in program history against Liberty, including a 2–1 victory in the team's inaugural 2014–15 season that represented its first result that resonated across the ACHA. On December 3, 2016, the Lynx handed Liberty its first ACHA home loss in more than two calendar years. It was LU–Belleville's first-ever win over a top-ranked team and also helped ensure the squad's qualification for the 2017 ACHA National Tournament regardless of whether it secured the WWCHL's automatic bid. A revenge-minded Lynx team, following the 2019 national championship loss, closed the series by winning two of three from Liberty in 2019–20, after both teams joined WMCH.

Liberty won the all-time series 9–4–1.

=== McKendree ===
McKendree University established an ACHA Division 1 team for the 2016–17 season, with the Lebanon, Illinois-based school becoming LU–B's closest neighbor in the division by a wide margin (the campuses are roughly 12 miles apart, with Chicago, Illinois' Robert Morris (IL) previously holding the distinction at 300 miles away). The teams, despite their proximity, did not meet on the ice until the 2018–19 season, when the Lynx defeated the Bearcats 5–0 on November 11, 2018, to clinch the championship of the Robert Morris Showcase. Two Jessica Walker goals supported a Hannah Stone shutout in the victory.

After that contest the teams became regular opponents, playing twice more in 2018–19 before becoming two of the six charter members of WMCH the following season. LU–B finished with a perfect 6–0–0 mark against McKendree, with the final meeting coming in the 2020 WMCH third-place game.

== See also ==
- American Collegiate Hockey Association
- Western Women's Collegiate Hockey League
- Lindenwood University – Belleville
