= MSU Dome =

Multi-purpose arena in North Dakota, United States

Coordinates: 48°14′53.50″N 101°18′1.50″W

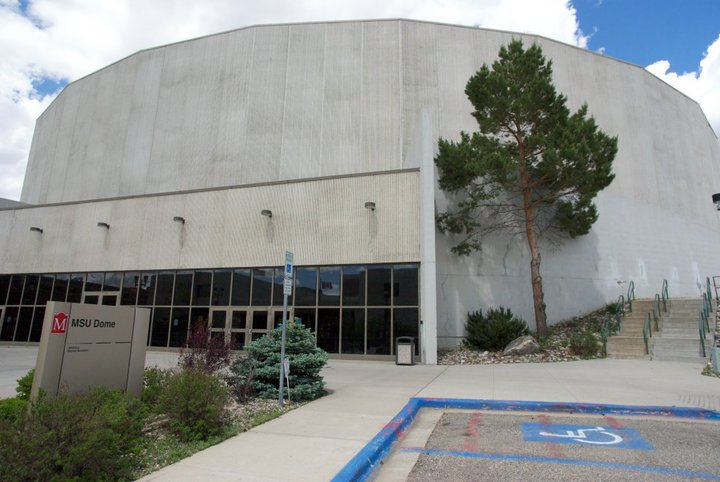
MSU Dome

MSU Dome is a 10,000-seat multi-purpose arena in the north central United States, located at 11th Ave NW on the campus of Minot State University in Minot, North Dakota. Built in the early 1980s, is home to the Minot State Beavers basketball team. It is also regularly used for the Prairie Rose State Games, Regional Special Olympics, Math Track Meets, and Minot High School and MSU graduation ceremonies. The MSU Dome is also home to several North Dakota High School Championships each year, of these the North Dakota State Class B Basketball Championship is the biggest attraction to Minot and the Dome.

== 2011 Souris River Flood ==
The Dome was used as an evacuee shelter during the 2011 Souris River Flood.
