= Western Women's Collegiate Hockey League =

Women's college hockey conference

- Conference: ACHA
- Founded: 2014
- Commissioner: Lindsey Ellis
- Sports fielded: Ice Hockey
- Division: Women's Division 1
- No. of teams: 6
- Region: West
- Official website: https://www.wwchl.com/

Locations

The Western Women's Collegiate Hockey League (WWCHL) is an American Collegiate Hockey Association Women's Division 1 club level hockey-only college athletic conference for women's hockey teams. It is one of four ACHA Women's Division 1 conferences, along with the Central Collegiate Women's Hockey Association, Women's Midwest College Hockey, and the Eastern Collegiate Women's Hockey League. The league has a large footprint spreading across the western United States, featuring members in Arizona, Colorado and Utah.

Among the ten members the conference has hosted, both Minnesota (2013) and Wisconsin (2002 and 2004) won ACHA national championships prior to joining the WWCHL, while Colorado and Colorado State also have lengthy histories pre-dating the conference's creation. The rest of the league roster, however, consists of newer programs, largely in emerging hockey locales. Denver began play, as the WWCHL itself did, for the 2014–15 season. Arizona State started its program in 2016–17 while Grand Canyon and the University of Utah did so in 2017–18 and 2019–20, respectively.

== Current membership ==
Institution	Location	Nickname	Founded	Type	Enrollment	Colors	Primary Facility
Arizona State University	Tempe, Arizona	Sun Devils	1885	Public	51,585	Maroon and Gold	Mullett Arena
Colorado State University	Fort Collins, Colorado	Rams	1870	Public	33,877	Green and Gold	Edora Pool Ice Center
Grand Canyon University	Phoenix, Arizona	Antelopes	1949	Private/Christian	20,500	Purple, Black and White	AZ Ice Arcadia
University of Colorado	Boulder, Colorado	Buffaloes	1876	Public	35,528	Silver, Black and Gold	CU Recreation Center
University of Denver	Denver, Colorado	Pioneers	1864	Private	11,614	Crimson and Gold	Joy Burns Ice Arena
University of Utah	Salt Lake City, Utah	Utes	1850	Public	32,994	Red, Silver and Black	SLC Sports Complex

== Playoff championship game results ==
Year	Champion	Score	Runner-Up	Location
2015	Minnesota	3–2 (OT)	Colorado State	Sun Prairie, Wisconsin
2016	Lindenwood–Belleville	2–1	Colorado	Boulder, Colorado
2017	Minnesota	2–1	Colorado	Tempe, Arizona
2018	Colorado	5–2	Minnesota	Fremont, Nebraska
2019	Midland	3–2 (2OT)	Colorado	Las Vegas, Nevada
2020	Colorado	5–1	Arizona State	Salt Lake City, Utah

=== Regular season champions ===
- 2014–15 Colorado State
- 2015–16 Lindenwood–Belleville
- 2016–17 Lindenwood–Belleville
- 2017–18 Colorado
- 2018–19 Colorado
- 2019–20 Colorado

== ACHA National Tournament appearances ==
Appearances made while a WWCHL member.

School	Appearances	Years	Championships
Lindenwood–Belleville	3	2016, 2017, 2018	None
Minnesota	3	2015, 2017, 2018	None
Colorado	2	2018, 2020	None
Midland	1	2019	None

== World University Games selections ==
Since 2011, the American Collegiate Hockey Association has supplied players for the United States team at the World University Games women's hockey tournament, held biennially and as part of the multi-sport event for college and university student-athletes.

Year	Location	Player	School	Result
2015	Granada, Spain	Molly O'Neil	Colorado State	Fifth Place
2015	Granada, Spain	Whitney Thomas	Colorado	Fifth Place
2017	Almaty, Kazakhstan	Jordan Anderson	Minnesota	Bronze Medal
2017	Almaty, Kazakhstan	Kathleen Ash	Colorado	Bronze Medal
2017	Almaty, Kazakhstan	Alexandra Brown	Lindenwood–Belleville	Bronze Medal
2017	Almaty, Kazakhstan	Leah MacArthur	Colorado	Bronze Medal
2017	Almaty, Kazakhstan	Lyndsay Oden	Minnesota	Bronze Medal
2017	Almaty, Kazakhstan	Becca Senden	Minnesota	Bronze Medal
2017	Almaty, Kazakhstan	Livia Twohig	Minnesota	Bronze Medal
2019	Krasnoyarsk, Russia	Kathleen Ash	Colorado	Fourth Place

== Notable ACHA award winners ==
Year	Winner	School	Award
2014–15	Kelsey Brown	Colorado	Community Playmaker
2014–15	Emera Danos	Colorado	Off-Ice MVP
2015–16	Katherine Hannah	Lindenwood–Belleville	Coach of the Year
2018–19	Jason White	Midland	Coach of the Year
2018–19	Kenzie Bertolas	Midland	Off-Ice MVP

== See also ==
- American Collegiate Hockey Association
- Arizona State University Sun Devils Division 1 Women's Ice Hockey
- Lindenwood–Belleville Lynx women's ice hockey
- List of ice hockey leagues
