= Alexander Regier =

German-British-Colombian literary scholar

- Citizenship: German, British and Colombian

Academic background
- Education: Durham University (BA); University of Cambridge (MPhil, PhD)
- Website: profiles.rice.edu/faculty/alexander-regier

Alexander Regier is a German-British-Colombian literary scholar. He is the William Faulkner Professor of English at Rice University.

== Early life and education ==
Regier graduated with a first-class BA in English Literature and Philosophy at Durham University in 1999. He pursued postgraduate studies at the University of Cambridge, earning an MPhil in European Literature in 2000 and a PhD in English in 2004.

== Career and research ==
From 2005 to 2009, Regier was a Research Fellow at King's College, Cambridge. He joined Rice University in 2009 as an Assistant Professor and became a full Professor in 2019. He was editor of SEL: Studies in English Literature 1500–1900 from 2011 to 2012.

In 2017, Regier was a Visiting Fellow at CRASSH, where he worked on a project concerning Anglo-German literary connections during the Enlightenment era, with a particular focus on the relationship between William Blake and Johann Georg Hamann. In 2023, he spearheaded the purchase of a functional replica of the printing press used by William Blake.

== Publications ==
- Regier, Alexander; Uhlig, Stefan H. (2010). Wordsworth's Poetic Theory: Knowledge, Language, Experience. Palgrave Macmillan. ISBN 9780230525443.
- Regier, Alexander (2010). Fracture and Fragmentation in British Romanticism. Cambridge University Press. ISBN 9781107411777.
- ——— (2018). Exorbitant Enlightenment: Blake, Hamann, and Anglo-German Constellations. Oxford University Press. ISBN 9780198827122.
