= Minot State Beavers men's ice hockey =

- University: Minot State University
- Conference: MCH
- Head coach: Wyatt Waselenchuk; 3rd season
- Arena: Maysa Arena (1,500 seats); Minot, North Dakota
- Colors: Green and red

ACHA tournament champions
- 2013, 2019, 2023

ACHA tournament appearances
- 2000, 2001, 2002, 2003, 2004, 2010, 2011, 2012, 2013, 2014, 2015, 2016, 2017, 2018, 2019, 2021, 2022, 2023

The Minot State Beavers men's ice hockey is the college ice hockey program that represents Minot State University. The team competes in the ACHA Division I level as part of Midwest College Hockey. The team hosted the ACHA national tournament at All Seasons Arena in 2000. Prior to 1984, the team was part of the NAIA, before the NAIA dropped ice hockey as part of their program. The team's head coach is Wyatt Waselenchuk.

== History ==
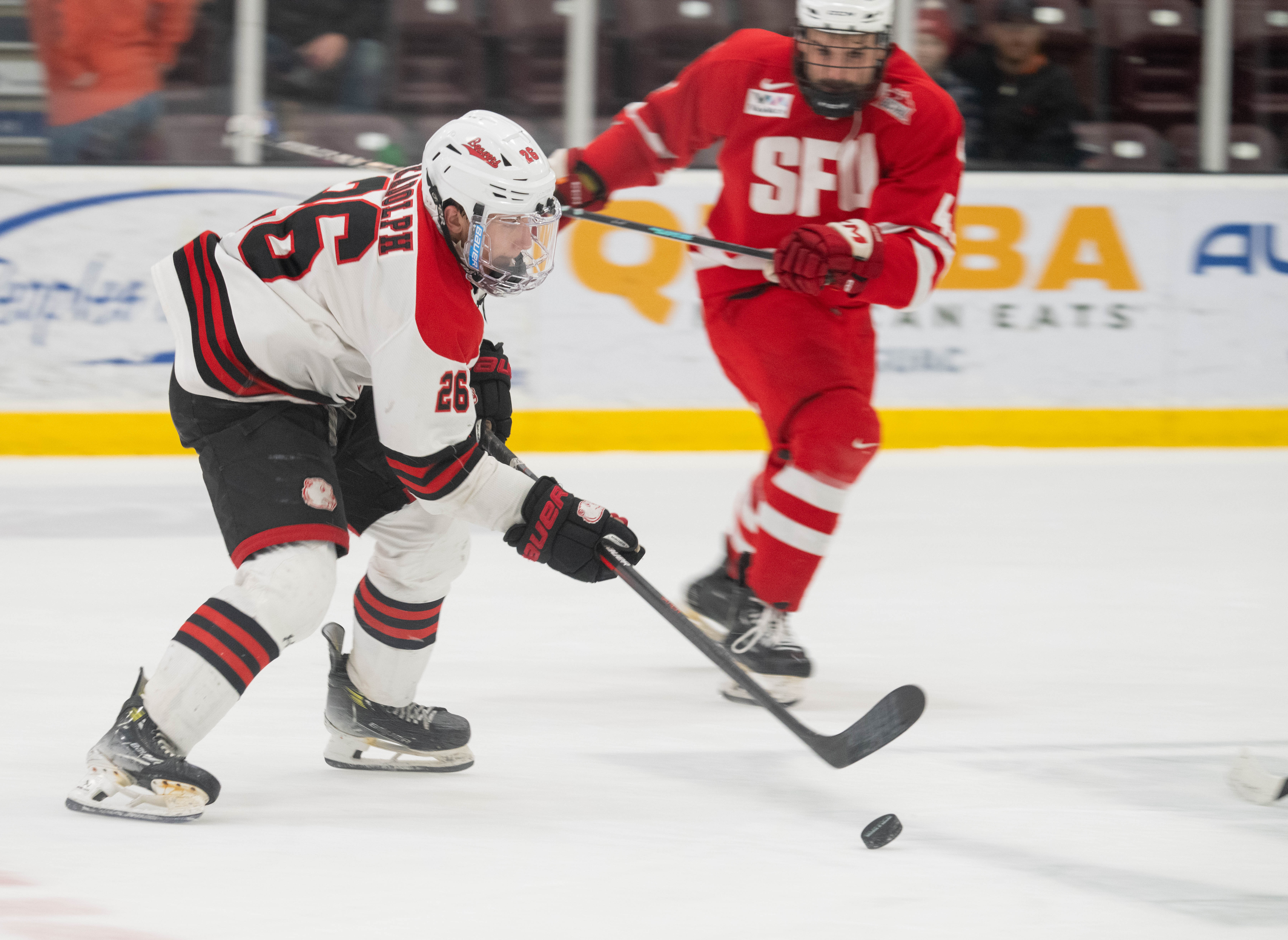
A Beavers men's ice hockey player moves the puck up ice during a 2024 game at Maysa Arena

=== 2012–2013 ===
Freshmen Cody Hall, Brett Nespor, Bob Pond, Dallas Drysdale, Brody Haygarth, Ryan Curzon and Sam Benson joined the team in 2012. Transfers William Kinsman and Jordan Willert also joined the team in 2012. Defenseman, Kyle Stephens, returned to the team in 2012, after playing a year with the El Paso Rhinos. The Beavers entered the ACHA Division 1 Tournament at Edge Ice Arena in Bensenville, Illinois in 2013. It was the team's fourth consecutive year in a row in the tournament. The Beavers, seeded third in the tournament, finished 26-4 on the year and have the fewest losses of tournament participants. The Beavers earned a first round bye. The Beavers defeated the Central Oklahoma Bronchos 5-0 is the second round on March 2, 2013. The Beavers defeated the Oklahoma Sooners 5-4 in overtime in the quarter-finals on March 3, 2013. The Beavers defeated the Ohio Bobcats 5-1 on March 5 to advance to the ACHA National Championship. The Beavers won the ACHA National Championship against Lindenwood Lions 9-5 on March 6.

=== Awards ===
The Beavers had three ACHA All-Americans, Logan Herauf 3rd team, Nigel Dube 2nd team and Wyatt Waselenchuk 1st team. Goalie Wyatt Waselenchuk was named 2013 ACHA Player-of-the-Year. Head Coach Wade Regier was also named Coach-of-the-Year.

== Players ==
=== Current roster ===
As of September 30, 2021.

No.	Nat.	Player	Class	Pos	Height	Weight	DoB	Hometown	Previous team	NHL rights
2		Jake Bestul	Junior	F	5' 7" (1.7 m)	165 lb (75 kg)	1998-03-19	Hibbing, Minnesota	Wisconsin–River Falls Falcons (NCAA)	—
4		Paul O'Connor (A)	Senior	D	5' 11" (1.8 m)	200 lb (91 kg)	1996-02-13	St. Peters, Missouri	Minot Minotauros (NAHL)	—
6		Eric Soar	Junior	D	5' 11" (1.8 m)	2000 lb (907 kg)	1998-01-22	Moose Jaw, Saskatchewan	Weyburn Red Wings (SJHL)	—
10		Jared Hamm	Freshman	F	5' 8" (1.73 m)	175 lb (79 kg)	1999-11-29	Warman, Saskatchewan	Notre Dame Hounds (SJHL)	—
11		Justin Metcalf	Senior	F	6' 2" (1.88 m)	190 lb (86 kg)	1997-06-11	Winnipeg, Manitoba	Neepawa Natives (MJHL)	—
17		Josh Pederson	Freshman	F	5' 11" (1.8 m)	155 lb (70 kg)	2000-01-04	White Rock, British Columbia	Alberni Valley Bulldogs (BCHL)	—
21		Payton Jerome	Freshman	D	5' 11" (1.8 m)	190 lb (86 kg)	2000-06-02	Regina, Saskatchewan	Notre Dame Hounds (SJHL)	—
24		Austin Wieler	Junior	D	6' 0" (1.83 m)	190 lb (86 kg)	1999-11-29	Laird, Saskatchewan	Notre Dame Hounds (SJHL)	—
27		Reid Arnold	Freshman	F	5' 10" (1.78 m)	173 lb (78 kg)	2000-10-21	Yorkton, Saskatchewan	Humboldt Broncos (SJHL)	—
28		Landyn Cochrane (A)	Senior	F	6' 0" (1.83 m)	168 lb (76 kg)	1997-04-05	Russell, Manitoba	Virden Oil Capitals (MJHL)	—
31		Tre Sortland	Freshman	G	6' 0" (1.83 m)	175 lb (79 kg)	2003-07-04	Minot, North Dakota	Minot Magicians (NDHSAA)	—
33		Riley Wallace	Sophomore	G	5' 9" (1.75 m)	160 lb (73 kg)	2000-03-30	Oak Lake, Manitoba	Virden Oil Capitals (MJHL)	—
37		Jake Anthony	Freshman	G	6' 1" (1.85 m)	175 lb (79 kg)	1999-02-13	Grande Prairie, Alberta	Dryden Ice Dogs (SIJHL)	—
44		Connor Navrot	Senior	F	6' 3" (1.91 m)	203 lb (92 kg)	1997-04-20	Warman, Saskatchewan	Swan Valley Stampeders (MJHL)	—
53		Wayde Johannesson	Junior	D	6' 0" (1.83 m)	197 lb (89 kg)	1998-07-08	Arnes, Manitoba	Selkirk Steelers (MJHL)	—
61		Dalton Dosko	Junior	F	6' 0" (1.83 m)	190 lb (86 kg)	1998-01-22	Kenai, Alaska	La Ronge Ice Wolves (SJHL)	—
64		Nick Doyle	Sophomore	D	5' 11" (1.8 m)	171 lb (78 kg)	1999-05-04	Winnipeg, Manitoba	Waywayseecappo Wolverines (MJHL)	—
68		Jordan Robertson	Junior	F	5' 10" (1.78 m)	168 lb (76 kg)	1997-10-19	Brandon, Manitoba	Revelstoke Grizzlies (KIJHL)	—
74		Brayden Pawluk	Sophomore	D	6' 0" (1.83 m)	168 lb (76 kg)	1999-06-23	Teulon, Manitoba	Dauphin Kings (MJHL)	—
76		Jagger Thiessen	Junior	F	5' 9" (1.75 m)	150 lb (68 kg)	1998-04-07	Okotoks, Alberta	Okotoks Bisons (HJHL)	—
78		Davis Sheldon (C)	Senior	F	5' 10" (1.78 m)	185 lb (84 kg)	1997-09-09	Nanton, Alberta	Fort McMurray Oil Barons (AJHL)	—
82		Carter Barley	Sophomore	F	6' 2" (1.88 m)	186 lb (84 kg)	1999-12-21	St. Andrews, Manitoba	Portage Terriers (MJHL)	—
93		Reece Henry	Freshman	F	6' 1" (1.85 m)	167 lb (76 kg)	2000-10-21	Regina, Saskatchewan	Cranbrook Bucks (BCHL)	—
97		Drew Carter (A)	Senior	F	6' 2" (1.88 m)	195 lb (88 kg)	1997-04-05	Kelowna, British Columbia	Princeton Posse (KIJHL)	—
