= Minot State University =

Public university in Minot, North Dakota, US

Coordinates: 48.246°N 101.301°W

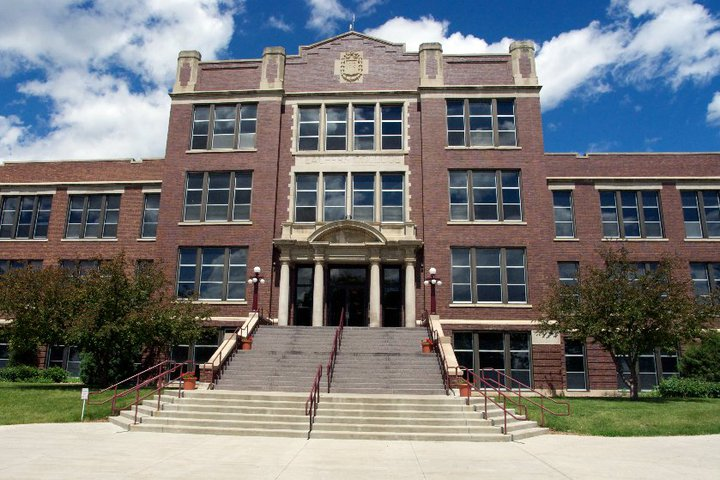
- Old Main at the MSU
- Former names: Minot Normal School (1913–1924); Minot State Teachers College (1924–1963); Minot State College (1964–1986); State University of North Dakota - Minot (1987)
- Type: Public university
- Established: 1913; 113 years ago
- Parent institution: North Dakota University System
- Academic affiliations: Space-grant
- President: Steven Shirley
- Faculty: 146
- Students: 2,656 (Undergraduate); 264 (Graduate)
- Location: Minot, North Dakota, United States
- Campus: Rural
- Colors: Green and red
- Nickname: Beavers
- Sporting affiliations: NCAA Division II – NSIC
- Mascot: Buckshot the Beaver
- Website: minotstateu.edu

Location in the United States
Location in North Dakota

Minot State University (MSU or MiSU) is a public university in Minot, North Dakota, United States. Founded in 1913 as a normal school, MSU evolved into a university in 1987 and is currently the state's third-largest, offering undergraduate and graduate degree programs.

Four schools comprise the university's academic offering. Nine master's degrees and one education specialist degree are offered in areas such as communication disorders, management, and mathematics. A mix of liberal arts and professional programs offers more than 60 majors at the undergraduate level. MSU is a North Dakota University System member.

Minot State's mascot is the beaver, the school colors are red and green (though Maroon has been used at times in the past), and the campus newspaper is the Red and Green. The MSU campus is at the base of Minot's North Hill, just west of Broadway (U.S. Route 83).

== History ==
MSU was established as a two-year normal school devoted to preparing teachers for service in northwestern North Dakota. In 1924, the Normal School at Minot began issuing baccalaureate degrees, necessitating a name change to Minot State Teachers College. Over time, the range of academic offerings expanded; as a result, the school's name was changed to Minot State College in 1964.

During the Second World War, Minot State trained nearly eight-hundred officer candidates as part of the V-12 Navy College Training Program.

In 1984, the North Dakota Legislative Assembly passed a bill renaming the institution to Dakota Northwestern University. After the bill was signed by the state governor and secretary of state, it became the subject of multiple legal challenges. On June 12, 1984, the bill was struck down by a statewide referendum.

In 1987, the institution was granted university status. It was designated as State University of North Dakota - Minot from January 1, 1987 until April 27, 1987, when it received its current name.

In 1996, the North Dakota University System realigned the relationships between certain institutions within the state. North Dakota State University - Bottineau, located in Bottineau, North Dakota was renamed to Minot State University - Bottineau and became an independently-accredited affiliate campus of MSU.

== Academics ==
Undergraduate demographics as of Fall 2023
Race and ethnicity	Total
White	64%
International student	11%
Hispanic	10%
Two or more races	7%
Black	5%
American Indian/Alaska Native	2%
Asian	1%
Unknown	1%
Economic diversity
Low-income (Note: The percentage of students who received an income-based federal Pell grant intended for low-income students.)	27%
Affluent (Note: The percentage of students who are a part of the American middle class at the bare minimum.)	73%

The university awards undergraduate degrees in more than 60 courses of study and graduate degrees in 10 fields of study.

MSU is composed of four main academic divisions:

- School of Arts, Humanities, and Social Sciences
  - 3 academic departments
- School of Business, Math, and Technology
  - 2 academic departments
- School of Education and Behavioral Sciences
  - 2 academic departments
- School of Science and Health
  - 3 academic departments
- Teacher Licensure Program
- Graduate School

=== University rankings ===
The school was ranked 976th on the 2013–2014 PayScale College Salary Report and 1,346th on the 2013 PayScale College Education Value Rankings.

== Accreditation ==
MSU is fully accredited by the Higher Learning Commission. Business Programs at MSU and the College of Business Graduate School are fully accredited by the IACBE. The Bachelor's and master's degrees in Business Education are accredited by NCATE.

Other accreditation:

- National Council for Accreditation of Teacher Education
- National Association of Schools of Music
- Council on Education of the Deaf
- Council on Academic Accreditation of the American Speech-Language-Hearing Association
- Council on Social Work Education–Baccalaureate level
- International Assembly for Collegiate Business Education
- National League for Nursing Accrediting Commission, Inc.
- National Association of School Psychologists
- North Dakota Board of Nursing

== Gordon B. Olson Library ==
Completed in the spring of 1992, the Gordon B. Olson Library presently serves an enrollment of more than 3,000 students. The three-story facility features seating for 800 students, as well as computer labs.

Dr. Gordon B. Olson came to Minot State University during the summer of 1967 and led the university through growth and change. In 1967, enrollment was slightly more than 2,000. During Dr. Olson's tenure, MSU added many undergraduate and graduate programs. New undergraduate degrees included nursing, social work, and criminal justice. Graduate programs expanded from only one in 1967 to 13. Each of these programs addresses societal needs and the needs of students who pursue careers in these fields.

== Athletics ==
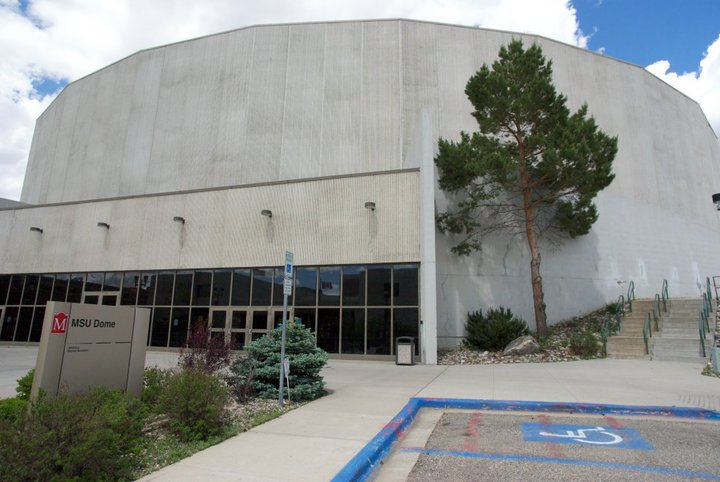
The MSU Dome houses numerous athletic events and served as a shelter during the 2011 Flood

Minot State University athletics compete in the Northern Sun Intercollegiate Conference (NSIC) which is a part of NCAA Division II

MSU's sports program offers football, both men's and women's club hockey, basketball, cross country, indoor/outdoor track and field, golf, baseball, wrestling, women's soccer, volleyball, and fastpitch softball.

Minot State's ice hockey team won the ACHA Men's Division I national championship in 2013, 2019, and 2023, with a runner-up finish in 2021.

== Wellness Center ==
The Wellness Center has rock climbing, exercise equipment, weight rooms, intramural gym space, group exercise classes, and wellness events.

== Facilities ==
Campus facilities include a theater, indoor theatre, recital hall, the Gordon B. Olson library, a football field, the MSU Wellness Center, and the MSU Dome arena. The Student Union includes a bookstore, convenience store, dining center, and lounge areas. MSU has four student residence halls and three apartment complexes.

== Transportation ==
MSU is located north of downtown Minot, approximately halfway between the Amtrak station and the airport. This allows students and faculty easy access to intercity travel. Within Minot, Minot City Transit provides bus service to campus on weekdays via the North, North Central, and West routes.

== Notable alumni ==
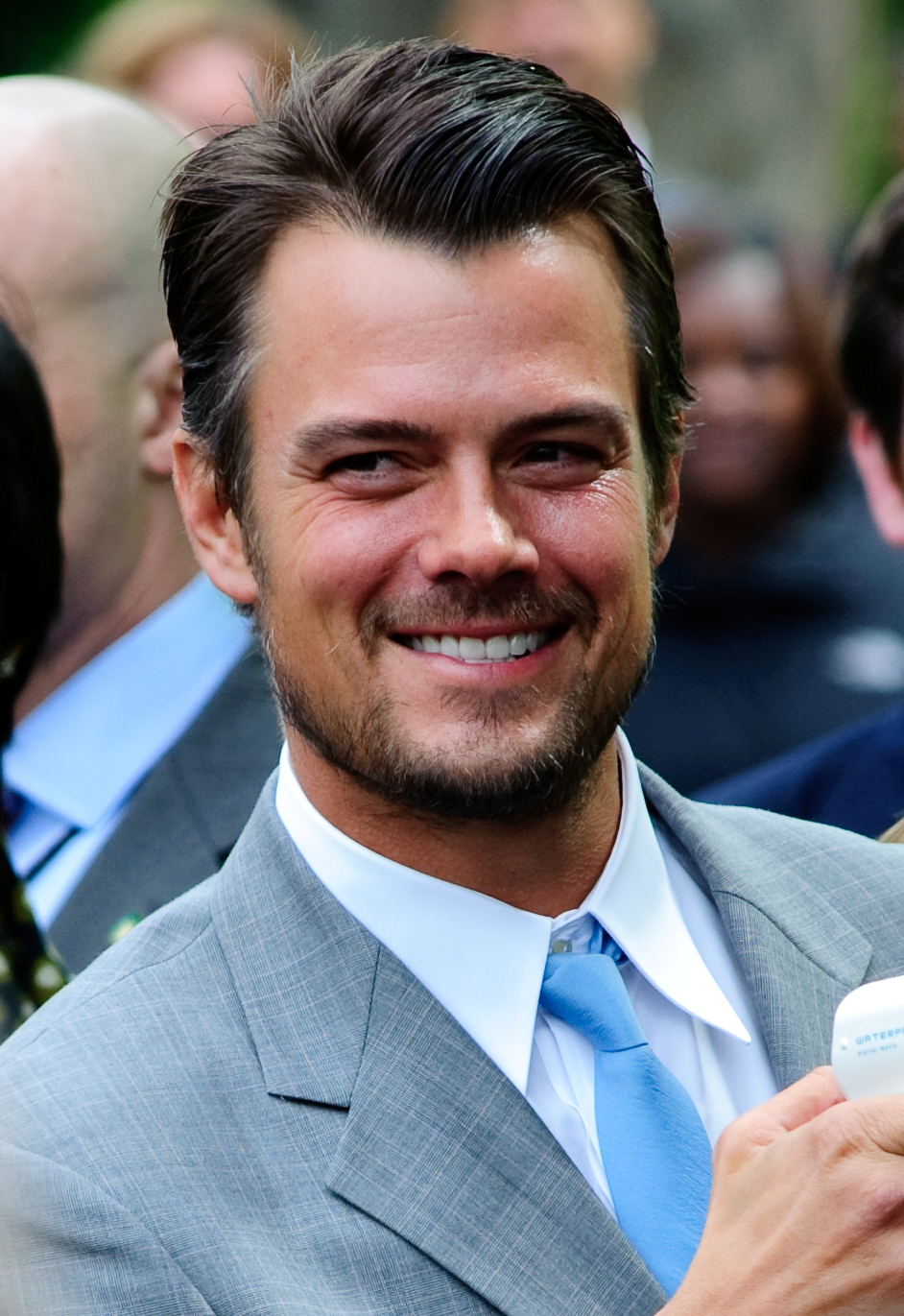
Josh Duhamel

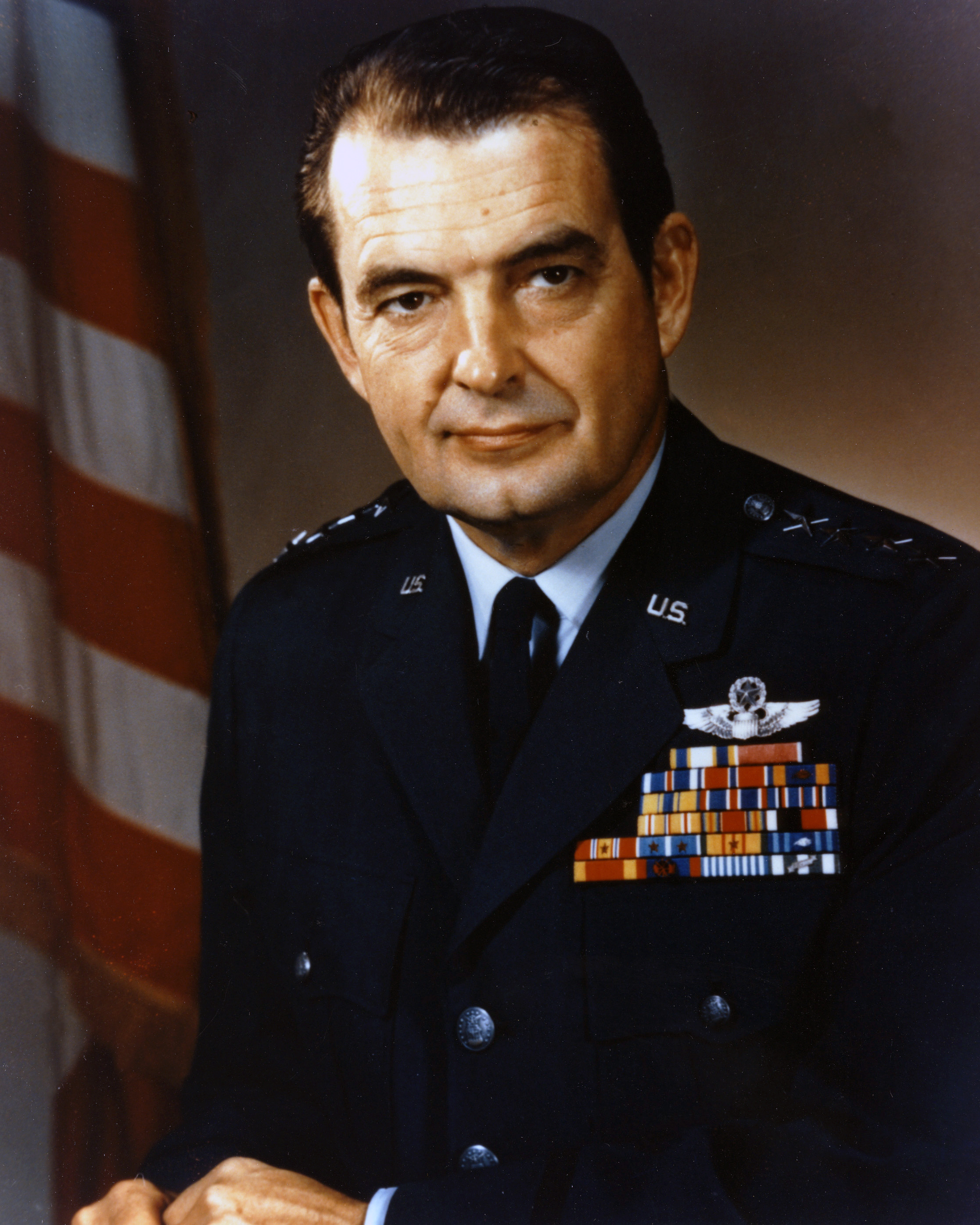
Gen. David C. Jones, former chairman of the Joint Chiefs of Staff

- Dale Brown – former LSU basketball head coach (1972–1997)
- Gary Cederstrom – former Major League Baseball umpire
- Scott Deibert – former Canadian football player
- Josh Duhamel – Emmy Award-winning actor and model
- Ray Giacoletti – retired college basketball coach
- Rocky Hager – retired college football coach
- Brynhild Haugland – longest-serving state legislator in history of United States
- Joan Heckaman – former member of North Dakota Senate, 23rd District (2006–2022)
- Randy Hedberg – former NFL quarterback, later MSU football head coach (1982–89)
- Mikey Hoeven – former first lady of North Dakota, wife of Senator John Hoeven
- David C. Jones, General, United States Air Force – former USAF Chief of Staff (1974–1978) and Chairman of the Joint Chiefs of Staff (1978–1982)
- Douglas Kary – member of Montana Senate, 22nd District (2015–Present); member of Montana House of Representatives, 48th District (2010–2015)
- Doug Larsen – former member of North Dakota Senate, 34th District (2020–2023)
- Stanley W. Lyson – member of North Dakota Senate, 1st District (1999–2014)
- Mary Manross – former mayor of Scottsdale, Arizona (2000–2008)
- Mary Sherman Morgan – rocket fuel scientist credited with invention of liquid fuel Hydyne in 1957, which powered Jupiter-C rocket that boosted first U.S. satellite
- David O'Connell – former North Dakota state senator (1988–2016) and representative (1983–1988)
- Sean Ortiz – Canadian Football League defensive lineman, BC Lions (2008–2012)
- Charles Payne – Fox Business Channel contributor (Cavuto on Business, Cashin' In, Bulls and Bears)
- A. R. Shaw – former educator and mayor of Mandan, North Dakota (1968–72)
- John Warner – former North Dakota state senator (2005–2016) and representative (1997–2004)
- Lisa Wolf – former member of North Dakota House of Representatives (2007–2010)

== Notable administrators and faculty ==
- Arthur G. Crane – the first president of Minot Normal School, and later Governor of Wyoming (1949–1951)
- Ernst Ising – professor (1947–48); physicist credited with developing Ising model
- Wade Regier – former Minot State Beavers men's ice hockey coach (2010–2021), ACHA D-I National Championship (2013)
