= Cumberland County Blues =

- City: Springhill, Nova Scotia, Canada
- League: Nova Scotia Junior Hockey League
- Division: Sid Rowe
- Founded: 2004
- Home arena: Dr. Carson & Marion Murray Community Centre
- Colours: Blue, Yellow, Black and White
- Owner: Cumberland Blues Executive
- President: Doug Williams
- Head coach: Greg Nickerson

Franchise history
- 2000–2003: Oxford Blues
- 2004–2024: Cumberland County Blues

The Cumberland County Blues were a Canadian Junior ice hockey club from Springhill, Nova Scotia. They are members of the Nova Scotia Junior Hockey League and were the 2010 Don Johnson Cup Maritime Junior B champions.

== History ==
In 2007, the Blues hosted the Don Johnson Cup, the Maritime Junior B Championship. They would go on to lose in the final to the East Hants Penguins 2–0. They finished the tournament with a 4–2–0 record.

In 2010, the Cumberland County Blues won their second consecutive NSJHL championship. They won the right to attend their second straight Don Johnson Cup Maritime Junior B Championship. In 2009, after an impressive 3–1–0 record in the round robin, they were dropped 6–5 in the semi-final by the St. John's Junior Hockey League's St. John's Jr. Caps in Bay Roberts, Newfoundland and Labrador. In 2010, in St. Margaret's Bay, Nova Scotia, the Blues had a chance for redemption. In the first game of the round robin, the Blues clipped the host Bay Ducks 6–4. In their second game, they defeated the defending Jr. Caps 3–2 in an overtime shootout. The Blues third game was lost to the New Brunswick Junior B Hockey League's Charlotte County Jr. Silverkings 4–3, but they closed out the round robin strong the next day by beating the Island Junior Hockey League's Kensington Vipers 7–2 to clinch first in the tournament. On April 24, the Blues again played the Jr. Caps in the semi-final. The Blues again defeated them 3–2 to enter the finals. On April 25, in the final, the Blues beat the Bay Ducks 4–1 to clinch their first ever Don Johnson Cup as Maritime Champions.

Just prior to the start of the 2023-24 season, the Blues announced the termination of the franchise. It was so late the league maintain the schedule and showed the Blues as a forfeit for their 32 games.

== Season-by-season record ==
Season	GP	W	L	T	OTL	GF	GA	P	Results	Playoffs
2002–03	32	7	24	1	0	141	225	15	9th NSJBHL	
2003–04	Leave of Absence									
2004–05	32	9	22	1	0	101	157	19	9th NSJBHL	
2005–06	34	15	17	1	1	122	126	32	6th NSJBHL	
2006–07	34	18	15	-	1	128	138	37	6th NSJHL	DJC as Host
2007–08	34	27	7	-	0	190	101	54	1st NSJHL	
2008–09	34	27	6	-	1	162	85	55	1st NSJHL	Won League
2009–10	34	26	4	-	4	191	90	56	1st NSJHL	Won League; Won DJC
2010–11	34	20	10	-	4	176	139	44	2nd Sid Rowe Div; 4th NSJHL	Won Div SemiFinal, 4–3 (Bulldogs); Lost Div Finals, 3–4 (Pirates)
2011–12	34	11	19	-	4	153	177	26	4th Sid Rowe Div; 10th NSJHL	Lost Div SemiFinal, 4–3 (Pirates)
2012–13	34	10	23	-	1	101	163	21	5th Sid Rowe Div; 11th NSJHL	Didn't Qualify
2013–14	34	9	24	-	1	102	179	19	5th Sid Rowe Div; 11 of 11 NSJHL	Didn't Qualify
2014–15	34	6	29	-	2	98	244	14	5th Sid Rowe Div; 11 of 11 NSJHL	Didn't Qualify

Season	GP	W	OTW/SOW	T/OTL	L	GF	GA	P	Results	Playoffs
2015–16	34	8	2	3	17	-	-	25	4th of 5 Sid Rowe; 10th of 11 NSJHL	Lost Div Semifinal, 0–4 (Jr. Miners)
2016–17	34	9	2	7	20	104	140	24	5th of 5 Sid Rowe; 10th of 11 NSJHL	did not qualify
2017–18	34	1	-	1	32	93	248	3	5th of 5 Sid Rowe; 11th of 11 NSJHL	did not qualify
2018–19	32	4	-	0	28	80	245	8	6th of 6 Sid Rowe; 11th of 12 NSJHL	did not qualify
2019–20	31	5	-	2	24	88	164	12	6th of 6 Sid Rowe; 11th of 12 NSJHL	did not qualify
2020–21	5	1	-	1	3	12	22	3	6th of 6 Sid Rowe; 12th of 12 NSJHL	season -covid
2021–22	20	5	-	2	13	52	91	12	6th of 6 Sid Rowe; 10th of 12 NSJHL	Lost quarterfinals. 0-3 (Jr. Miners)
2022–23	30	2	-	1	27	79	222	5	6th of 6 Sid Rowe; 12th of 12 NSJHL	did not qualify

== Don Johnson Cup ==
Eastern Canada Jr B Championships

Year	Round Robin	Record	Standing	SemiFinal	Bronze Medal Game	Gold Medal Game
2007; HOST	L, East Hants 2–7; W, Madawska (Quebec) 12–1; W, Central 15–1; W, Kensington 8–2	3–1–0	2nd of 5	W, Kensington 3–2	n/a	L, East Hants 0–2; Silver Medal
2009	W, Central 7–2; W, Conception Bay 6–4; SOW, St John's 7–4; OTL, Sherwood 4–5	3–1–0	2nd of 5	L, St John's 5–6	n/a	n/a
2010	W, Bay 6–4; SOW, St John's 3–2; L, Charlotte County 3–4; W, Kensington 7–2	3–1–0	1st of 5	W, St John's 3–2	n/a	W, Bay 4–1; Don Johnson; Cup Champions

Preceded by St. John's Jr. Caps	Don Johnson Cup Champions; 2010	Succeeded by Kensington Vipers
