= Sackville =

Sackville may refer to:

== People ==
- Sackville (surname)
- Sackville (given name)
- Baron Sackville, a title in the Peerage of the United Kingdom
- Viscount Sackville, a title in the Peerage of Great Britain

== Places ==
=== Australia ===
- Sackville, New South Wales
- Sackville Ward, Kew Melbourne

=== Canada ===
- Sackville, New Brunswick
  - Sackville station
- Sackville Parish, New Brunswick
- Sackville (electoral district), Nova Scotia
- Sackville Island, in Thompson Sound (British Columbia)
- Sackville River, Nova Scotia

== Music ==
- Sackville (band), a band from Montreal, Quebec, Canada
- "Sackville ", a song by Inspiral Carpets from the 1990 album Life
- Sackville Records, a defunct Canadian jazz record label

== Other uses ==
- HMCS Sackville, a Canadian corvette

== See also ==
- Fort Sackville (disambiguation)
- Upper Sackville (disambiguation)
- Middle Sackville (disambiguation)
- Lower Sackville, Nova Scotia, Canada
- Sackville Blazers, a Canadian Junior ice hockey team from Lower Sackville, Nova Scotia
- Sackville College, a historic almshouse in East Grinstead, West Sussex, England
- Sackville Gallery, in London, England, a former art gallery
- Sackville House, in East Washington, Pennsylvania, United States
- Sackville North, New South Wales, Australia
- Sackville School (disambiguation)
- Sackville Sewer, a river and drainage ditch in Hailsham, East Sussex, England
- Sackville Street (disambiguation)
