= Windsor Royals (ice hockey) =

Windsor Oxen
- City: Windsor, Nova Scotia, Canada
- League: Nova Scotia Junior Hockey League
- Division: Fred Fox
- Founded: c. 1967
- Home arena: West Hants Recreation & Heritage Centre
- Colours: Black, Burgundy and White
- General manager: David Keith
- Head coach: Josh Dill

Franchise history
- 1967–2012: Windsor Royals
- 2012–2025: Valley Maple Leafs
- 2025–current: Windsor Oxen

The Windsor Oxen are a Canadian Junior ice hockey club from Windsor, Nova Scotia. They were members of the Nova Scotia Junior Hockey League and were 1998, 2001, and 2008 Don Johnson Cup Maritime Junior B champions.

== History ==
Founded in 1967 as a member of the Metro Valley Junior B Hockey League, the team became a Junior A team in 1977 but folded only two years later. They were the Metro Valley League's first ever champion in 1968. After a five-year hiatus, the Royals came back to help the Mainland Junior B Hockey League and since 1984 have been a prominent member of the league.

The Royals are one of three teams to have won the Don Johnson Cup as Maritime Junior B Champions 3 times. The other two are the Sackville Blazers and the St. John's Jr. 50's.

In 1998, the Royals were the Nova Scotia Junior B Champions. With the win, the Royals went to Summerside, Prince Edward Island to compete for the Don Johnson Cup. They made it all the way to the finals, where they met the New Brunswick Junior B Hockey League's Richibucto Bears and defeated them 4-2 to win their first Maritime Championship.

In 2001, the Royals were selected to be the host site of the Don Johnson Cup. As host site, they were allowed to compete in the competition despite not winning their league. They would go on to defeat their own league champion, the Strait Pirates, 3-1 in the championship game to win their second Maritime Junior B Championship.

In 2008, the Royals won their league and moved on to the Don Johnson Cup. In their first game, they lost to the St. John's Jr. Celtics 7-4. In Game 2, they then beat Dieppe-Memramcook Voyageurs (a Junior B team) from the New Brunswick Junior C Hockey League 6-3. Windsor then lost 4-3 to the Island Junior Hockey League's Kensington Vipers 4-3, but beat the host team Sherwood Falcons 6-2 in the same day. All five teams finished the round robin 2-2-0, but by virtue of goal differential the Royals finished first. On April 19, in the semi-final the Royals defeated Dieppe-Memramcook 3-1 and on April 20 they again beat Sherwood 4-1 to clinch their third Don Johnson Cup.

In 2012, the team took a one-year leave of absence, and did not make a return the following year. The Windsor Royals are now defunct. The Valley Maple Leafs though have filled their void and now play in the Town of Windsor in the same arena

Following the 2024-25 season the franchise was re-branded to the Windsor Oxen after being purchase by local ownership.

== Season-by-season record ==
Windsor Royals
Season	GP	W	L	T	OTL	GF	GA	P	Results	Playoffs
1969-70	30	14	12	3	-	--	--	32	5th MVJBHL	
1970-72	Statistics Not Available									
1972-73	40	24	11	5	-	223	183	53	2nd MVJBHL	
1973-74	33	14	12	7	-	169	150	35	5th MVJBHL	
1974-75	Statistics Not Available									
1975-76	31	24	4	3	-	198	115	51	2nd MVJBHL	
1976-77	32	20	11	1	-	154	113	41	2nd MVJBHL	
1977-78	36	5	30	1	-	135	254	11	7th MVJHL	
1978-79	28	3	23	2	-	63	244	8	7th MVJHL	Folded
1979-84	Dormant Franchise									
1984-88	Statistics Not Available									
1988-89	31	10	17	4	-	--	--	24	4th MLJBHL	
1989-90	29	15	14	0	-	153	147	30	3rd MLJBHL	
1990-91	30	17	12	1	-	178	151	35	3rd MLJBHL	
1991-92	29	12	16	1	-	151	170	25	3rd MLJBHL	Won League
1992-93	26	16	5	2	3	159	106	37	1st NSJBHL	Won League
1993-94	31	23	7	1	-	232	107	47	1st NSJBHL	
1994-95	31	23	5	3	-	174	106	49	2nd NSJBHL	Won League
1995-96	34	26	6	2	-	185	93	54	1st NSJBHL	Won League
1996-97	32	22	8	2	-	166	111	46	2nd NSJBHL	
1997-98	32	22	7	3	-	182	107	47	2nd NSJBHL	Won League, Won DJC
1998-99	32	13	16	2	1	145	145	29	6th NSJBHL	
1999-00	32	19	13	0	0	164	135	38	4th NSJBHL	
2000-01	34	22	7	3	2	186	103	49	3rd NSJBHL	Won DJC
2001-02	34	22	8	1	3	173	107	48	3rd NSJBHL	
2002-03	32	19	10	2	1	141	115	41	3rd NSJBHL	
2003-04	32	8	19	4	1	123	166	21	7th NSJBHL	
2004-05	32	17	13	2	0	145	130	36	3rd NSJBHL	
2005-06	34	13	16	3	2	134	147	31	7th NSJBHL	
2006-07	34	19	12	1	2	143	143	41	3rd NSJHL	
2007-08	34	22	12	0	0	151	117	44	3rd NSJHL	Won League, Won DJC
2008-09	34	4	28	1	1	68	148	10	9th NSJHL	
2009-10	34	14	19	0	1	121	136	29	8th NSJHL	
2010-11	34	28	6	-	0	159	81	56	1st NSJHL	
2011-12	32	22	7	1	2	134	72	47	2nd of 11 NSJHL	

Valley Maple Leafs
Season	GP	W	L	OTL	SOL	GF	GA	P	Results	Playoffs
2012-13	32	14	11	2	4	124	94	34	4th Fred Fox Div. 7 of 11 NSJHL	Lost Div Semifinal 1-4 (Sackville)
2013-14	32	25	8	0	1	141	106	51	1st Fred Fox Div. 2 of 11 NSJHL	Lost Div Semifinal 2-4 (East Hants)
2014-15	32	25	8	0	1	141	106	51	4th Fred Fox Div. 4 of 11 NSJHL	Won Div Semifinal 4-3 (East Hants); Won Div Finals 4-2 (Sackville) lost League Finals 0-4 (Glace Bay)
2015-16	no data recorded									
2016-17	34	23	10	1	0	145	116	47	1st Fred Fox Div. 2 of 11 NSJHL	Won Div Semifinal 4-1 (East Hants); Lost Div Finals 0-4 (Liverpool)
2017-18	34	16	11	3	3	135	131	38	4th Fred Fox Div. 6 of 11 NSJHL	Lost Div Semifinal 1-4 (East Hants)
2018-19	32	13	18	1	0	127	151	27	?? Fred Fox Div. 9 of 11 NSJHL	did not qualify
2019-20	32	12	16	4	0	129	166	28	?? Fred Fox Div. 8 of 12 NSJHL	did not qualify
2020-21	Season lost to covid pandemic									
2021-22	Season lost to covid pandemic									
2022-23	30	4	24	1	1	79	142	10	6 of 6 Fred Fox Div. 11 of 12 NSJHL	did not qualify
2023-24	32	7	22	3	0	73	143	17	6 of 6 Fred Fox Div. 11 of 12 NSJHL	did not qualify
2023-24	32	7	22	3	0	73	143	17	6 of 6 Fred Fox Div. 10 of 12 NSJHL	did not qualify
2024-25	30	10	18	2	0	91	141	22	5 of 6 Fred Fox Div. 9 of 11 NSJHL	did not qualify

Season	GP	W	L	OTL	SOL	GF	GA	P	Results	Playoffs
Windsor Oxen
2025-26										

== 1995-1996 NS Jr. B Hockey League Champions ==
Pos.	Player	Games	Goals	Assists	Points	Hometown
F	Lee Druken	33	20	31	51	Digby, NS
F	Darryl Banfield	31	23	23	46	St. John's, NL
F	Mike Fletcher	34	20	14	34	Rawdon, NS
F	Guy Poirier	20	10	18	28	Glace Bay, NS
F	Devon Veinot	32	11	17	28	Sweets Corner, NS
D	Kevin Lynch	33	8	19	27	Windsor, NS
F	Darren Ashby	34	14	13	27	Wolfville, NS
F	Evan Caldwell	34	16	10	26	New Minas, NS
F	Chris Walker	32	12	13	25	Spryfield, NS
D	Jimmy Johnson	33	5	19	24	Wolfville, NS
D	Jason Blanchard	34	7	17	24	Sweets Corner, NS
F	Jeff Hull	31	11	13	24	North Sydney, NS
F	Chris Hatchard	34	6	10	16	Windsor, NS
D	Emile Beliveau	33	4	10	14	Moncton, NB
F	Jamie Boyd	29	3	8	11	Windsor, NS
F	Shane Reaugh	11	6	5	11	South Shore, NS
D	Mark Phillips	28	2	9	11	Wolfville, NS
D	Chris Stott	32	1	8	9	Labrador City, NL
F	Charlie Aalders	6	1	1	2	Wolfville, NS

Preceded by Cape Breton Alpines	Don Johnson Cup Champions; 1998	Succeeded by Richibucto Bears
Preceded by Woodstock Slammers	Don Johnson Cup Champions; 2001	Succeeded by O'Leary Eagles
Preceded by East Hants Penguins	Don Johnson Cup Champions; 2008	Succeeded by St. John's Jr. Caps
