= Membertou Jr. Miners =

- City: Membertou, Nova Scotia, Canada
- League: Nova Scotia Junior Hockey League
- Division: Sid Rowe
- Founded: c. 1932
- Home arena: Membertou Sport and Wellness Center
- Colours: Black, Red and White
- Owner: Kameron Coal
- General manager: Ryan Boutillier
- Head coach: Ryan Boutillier

Franchise history
- c. 1932–1992: Sydney Millionaires
- 1992–1996: Cape Breton Jr. Mills
- 1996–2005: Cape Breton Alpines
- 2005–2007: Whitney Pier Canadians
- 2007–2010: Cape Breton Canadians
- 2010–2016: Glace Bay Jr. Miners
- 2016–2021: Kameron Jr. Miners
- 2021–present: Membertou Jr. Miners

The Membertou Junior Miners are a Canadian Junior ice hockey club from Membertou, Nova Scotia. They are members of the Nova Scotia Junior Hockey League and are 1989, 1997 and 2018 Don Johnson Cup Maritime Junior B champions and 1976 and 1977 Eastern League Junior A Champions. The team was located in Sydney, Nova Scotia up until 2005.

== History ==
First observed in the 1932-33 Cape Breton Junior Hockey League, the Sydney Millionaires (named after an earlier professional team) would win their league title in 1933, 1951, 1964, and 1965. In the 1950s they dabbled with other names like the "Steel Kings" and the "Bombers" as their sponsors changed, but they always came back to the Millionaires.

In the 1970s, the Millionaires joined the Eastern Junior B Hockey League. In 1975, the league became the Eastern Junior A Hockey League. The Millionaires won the league in 1976 by defeating the Glace Bay Miners 4-games-to-1 and the New Waterford Jets 4-games-to-none in the final. They moved on to the Eastern Canada Hewitt-Dudley Memorial Trophy semi-final where they lost 4-games-to-1 to the Island Junior Hockey League's Charlottetown Colonels.

The Millionaires repeated as champions in 1977 defeating the New Waterford Jets 4-games-to-none and then the Glace Bay Miners 4-games-to-2 in the final. In the Eastern Canada Junior A quarter-final, the Millionaires defeated the Newfoundland Champion Corner Brook Jr. Royals 4-games-to-none. In the semi-final, the Mills ran into PEI's Charlottetown Generals and were themselves swept 4-games-to-none from the playoffs.

In the 1980s, the Millionaires dropped down to Junior B in the Northumberland Junior B Hockey League. They were league and Provincial Junior B Champions in 1988, 1989, and 1990. In the 1989, at the Maritime Junior B Don Johnson Cup, the Millionaires would win their first Maritime Junior B Championship. In 1992, their league merged with the Mainland Junior B Hockey League and Mills became the Cape Breton Jr. Mills.

In 1996, the Mills became the Cape Breton Alpines. They would win the 1997 league title and move on to the Maritime Junior B Championship, the Don Johnson Cup, where they went undefeated, beating the New Brunswick Junior B Hockey League's Richibucto Bears 7-5, the Nova Scotia Junior Hockey League's Windsor Royals 5-4 in double overtime, and the Island Junior Hockey League's Sherwood-Parkdale Kings 8-4. In the final, the Alpines faced Windsor again, clinching their second Maritime Jr. B Championship with a 5-2 win at their home rink.

They would win another league title in 2000, but lost the Don Johnson Cup final to New Brunswick's Woodstock Slammers 4-1.

In 2005, with a sponsorship from Molson Breweries, the team moved to Whitney Pier, Nova Scotia and became the Whitney Pier Canadians. In 2007, they moved to Dominion, Nova Scotia and became the Cape Breton Canadians.

In the summer of 2010, the Canadians were moved to Glace Bay, Nova Scotia, Sydney's territorial rival, and renamed after their old nemesis the Glace Bay Jr. Miners. In 2016 they renamed themselves as the Kameron Jr. Moners and rebranded again in 2021 as Membertou Jr. Miners.

In January 2026, Membertou Jr. Miners lost an 5-4 overtime game against the Pictou County Scotians in Nova Scotia Junior Hockey League action on Saturday in Coxheath.

== Season-by-season record ==
For seasons 1950 to 2015
Season	GP	W	L	T	OTL	GF	GA	P	Results	Playoffs
1950-51	19	15	4	0	-	133	75	30	1st CBJHL	Won League, lost Provincial
1951-52	24	14	9	1	-	112	84	29	2nd CBJHL	Lost final
1952-53	24	11	12	1	-	104	115	23	2nd CBJHL	Lost final
1953-55	Statistics Not Available									
1955-56	20	14	5	1	-	131	92	29	1st CBJHL	Lost final
1956-75	Statistics Not Available									
1975-76	34	22	12	0	-	249	187	44	1st EJAHL	Won League
1976-77	36	26	7	3	-	--	--	55	1st EJAHL	Won League
1977-78	30	14	15	1	-	--	--	29	3rd EJAHL	Lost semi-final
1978-79	30	14	16	0	-	--	--	28	3rd EJAHL	Lost semi-final
1979-80	32	16	13	3	-	--	--	35	2nd EJAHL	Lost semi-final
1980-85	Statistics Not Available									
1985-86	30	3	26	1	-	123	241	7	4th NJBHL	
1986-92	Statistics Not Available									
1992-93	25	11	12	0	2	136	126	24	3rd NSJBHL	
1993-94	27	12	14	-	1	149	140	25	4th NSJBHL	
1994-95	32	14	14	-	4	156	177	32	3rd NSJBHL	
1995-96	34	19	12	1	2	178	140	40	4th NSJBHL	
1996-97	31	21	7	-	3	202	117	45	3rd NSJBHL	Won League, won DJC
1997-98	32	16	14	1	1	152	126	34	4th NSJBHL	
1998-99	31	21	9	0	1	174	113	43	2nd NSJBHL	
1999-00	32	23	9	0	0	208	113	46	2nd NSJBHL	Won League
2000-01	34	23	9	2	0	212	107	48	4th NSJBHL	
2001-02	34	22	8	2	2	172	125	48	4th NSJBHL	
2002-03	32	28	2	1	1	176	87	58	1st NSJBHL	
2003-04	32	21	8	2	1	143	97	45	3rd NSJBHL	
2004-05	32	11	17	1	3	120	157	26	7th NSJBHL	
2005-06	34	6	24	1	3	134	236	16	9th NSJBHL	
2006-07	Did Not Participate									
2007-08	33	4	29	0	0	123	248	8	10th NSJHL	did not qualify
2008-09	34	16	18	0	0	117	158	32	8th NSJHL	Lost quarter-finals, 0-4 (Blues)
2009-10	34	5	29	0	0	103	216	10	10th NSJHL	did not qualify
2010-11	34	10	20	-	4	108	191	24	4th / 5 Sid Rowe Div; 9th / 11 NSJHL	Lost div semi-final, 2-4 (Pirates)
2011-12	33	16	15	-	2	140	132	34	3rd / 5 Sid Rowe Div; 7th / 11 NSJHL	Lost div semi-final, 0-4 (Bulldogs)
2012-13	34	25	5	-	4	165	95	54	1st / 5 Sid Rowe Div; 1st / 11 NSJHL	Won Div Semifinal, 4-0 (Bulldogs); Lost Div Final, 1-4 (Pirates)
2013-14	34	27	4	-	3	175	92	57	1st / 5 Sid Rowe Div; 1st / 11 NSJHL	Won Div Semifinal, 4-0 (Bulldogs); Won Div Final, 4-0 (Pirates); Lost LEAGUE Finals, 3-4 (Blazers)
2014-15	34	27	47	-	-	191	8 3	54	1st / 5 Sid Rowe Div; 1st / 11 NSJHL	Won Div Semifinal, 4-0 (Bulldogs); Won Div. Finals 4-1, (Scotians); Won League Finals, 4-0 (Maple Leafs); NSJHL League Champions

Season	GP	W	OTW/SOW	T/OTL	L	GF	GA	P	Results	Playoffs
2015-16	34	22	2	3	6	-	-	73	1st of 5 Sid Rowe; 1st of 11 NSJH'L	Won Div Semifinal, 4-0 (Blues); Won Div Final, 4-2 (Scotians); Lost League Finals, 0-4 (Maple Leafs)
Kameron Jr. Miners
2016-17	34	21	1	5	7	149	94	70	1st of 5 Sid Rowe; 1st of 11 NSJH	Won Div Semifinal, 4-0 (Pirates); Lost Div. Finals, 3-4 (Scotians)
2017-18	34	26	-	2	6	157	93	54	1st of 5 Sid Rowe; 2nd of 11 NSJH	Won Div Semifinal, 4-0 (Pirates); Won Div. Finals, 4-1 (Bulldogs); Won League Finals 4-0 (Penguins); NSJHL League Champions
2018-19	32	20	-	5	7	170	108	45	2nd of 6 Sid Rowe; 4th of 12 NSJH	Won Div Semifinal, 4-1 (Scotians); Lost Div. Finals, 0-4 (Pirates)
2019-20	32	24	-	2	5	184	197	51	1st of 12 NSJH	Won Div Semifinal, 4-2 (Maple Leafs) remaining playoffs cancelled - covid
2020-21	5	3	-	2	0	26	11	51 8	Season lost due to COVID-19 pandemic	
Membertou Jr. Miners
2021-22	19	11	-	3	5	81	58	25	3rd of 6 Sid Rowe; 4th of 12 NSJH	Won Div Quarterfinal, 3-0 (Blues); Won Div. Semifinals, 4-2 (Pirates); Lost Div. Finals, 2-4 (Bulldogs)
2022-23	30	12	14	3	1	135	114	28	5th of 6 Sid Rowe; 10th of 12 NSJH	did not qualify for post season play
2023-24	32	21	10	1	0	112	101	43	2nd of 6 Sid Rowe; 5th of 12 NSJH	Won Div Semifinal, 4-0 (Pirates); Lost Div Finals, 1-4 (Bulldogs)
2024-25	30	12	16	2	0	96	146	26	3rd of 5 Sid Rowe; 7th of 11 NSJH	Lost Div Semifinal, 1-4 (Scotians)

== Don Johnson Memorial Cup ==
Eastern Canada Jr B Championships

Year	Round Robin	Record	Standing	Semifinal	Br. Med. Game	Gold Medal Game
2015	W, St. John's -Nfld 5-1; L, Moncton - NB 1-4; OTW, Tyne Valley - PEI 5-4; W, Kensington - PEI 2-0	3-1-0	2nd of 5	W, Kensington - PEI-1-0	n/a	L, Moncton - NB 1-4
2018; HOST	OTW, East Hants Penguins 5-4; W, Moncton Vito's 4-3; W, Western Red Wings 3-0; W, Mount Pearl Jr. Blades 6-1	4-0-0	1ST of 5	W, East Hants Penguins 5-2	n/a	Won, Mount Pearl Jr. Blades 4-1; Don Johnson Memorial; Cup Champions

Preceded by St. John's Jr. 50's	Don Johnson Cup Champions; 1989	Succeeded by St. Margaret's Bay Mariners
Preceded by St. Margaret's Bay Mariners	Don Johnson Cup Champions; 1997	Succeeded by Windsor Royals
