= East Hants Penguins =

Canadian junior ice hockey team

- City: East Hants, Nova Scotia, Canada
- League: Nova Scotia Junior Hockey League
- Division: Fred Fox
- Founded: 2000
- Home arena: East Hants Sportsplex
- Colours: Red, Black, Yellow, and White
- General manager: Kyle Isenor (2016–17)
- Head coach: Laurie Isenor (2016–17)

The East Hants Penguins are a Junior ice hockey team from East Hants, Nova Scotia, Canada. The Penguins play in the Nova Scotia Junior Hockey League and are the 2007 Don Johnson Cup Maritime Junior B Champions.

== History ==
The Penguins were founded in 2000, but East Hants has a history that dates back decades in junior hockey.

In 2007, the Penguins won their first league title and went on to the Don Johnson Cup Maritime Junior B Championships. They defeated the host Cumberland County Blues 7–2, Central West Junior Hockey League's Central Jr. Cataracts 11–2, New Brunswick's Madawaska 506 who played in Quebec all season 12–4, and the Island Junior Hockey League's Kensington Vipers 6–5 in overtime to finish first in the tournament round robin with a 4–0–0 record. In the semi-final, the Penguins again crushed Central 8–3 and in the final they defeated Cumberland County 2–0 to win their first and only Don Johnson Cup.

In 2011–12, the Penguins finished second place in the regular season with a 24–8–2 record. They would go on to win the league playoff championship. At the 2012 Don Johnson Cup in St. John's, Newfoundland and Labrador, the Penguins would finish the round robin with a record of three wins and one loss. The Penguins started the tournament with a 9–0 drubbing of the St. John's Junior Hockey League's Mount Pearl Jr. Blades. Next, the Penguins beat the New Brunswick Junior B Hockey League's Moncton Vito's 5–2. In the third game, the Penguins would win 3–2 in overtime to remain perfect, beating the Island Junior Hockey League's Kensington Vipers. In the final game of the round robin, the Penguins would face the also undefeated host St. John's Jr. Caps. The Jr. Caps won the game 3–2. In the semi-finals, the Penguins defeated the Kensington Vipers again 2–1. The Moncton Vito's upset the St. John's Jr. Caps in the other semi-final and were set to play the Penguins in the final. The final went to overtime and the Vito's prevailed with a 2–1 victory.

The Penguins reached the league finals in 2022, where they lost to the Munro Antigonish Jr. Bulldogs.

== Season-by-season record ==
Season	GP	W	L	T	OTL	GF	GA	P	Results	Playoffs
2000–01	35	5	26	3	1	119	213	14	9th NSJBHL	
2001–02	34	9	23	0	2	115	170	20	9th NSJBHL	
2002–03	32	10	16	3	3	125	133	26	6th NSJBHL	
2003–04	32	9	19	2	2	96	145	22	6th NSJBHL	
2004–05	32	10	22	0	0	105	120	20	8th NSJBHL	
2005–06	34	5	27	2	0	122	214	12	10th NSJBHL	
2006–07	34	29	3	0	2	225	122	60	1st NSJHL	Won League
2007–08	34	23	11	0	0	160	124	46	2nd NSJHL	Won Quarterfinals 4–0, Elks; Lost Semifinals 1–4, Royals
2008–09	Leave of Absence									
2009–10	34	10	18	3	3	107	169	26	5th of 5 Fred Fox; 9th of 10 NSJHL	failed to qualify
2010–11	34	17	14	-	3	133	163	37	3rd of 6 Fred Fox; 5th of 11 NSJHL	Lost Div. Semifinal 1–4, Ducks
2011–12	34	24	8	-	2	159	126	50	2nd of 6 Fred Fox; 2nd of 11 NSJHL	Won Div. Semifinal ?-?, Royals; Won Div. Finals 4–1, Ducks, Won League Finals 4–0, Bulldogs; Won League
2012–13	34	11	20	-	3	102	146	25	6th of 6 Fred Fox; 9th of 11 NSJHL	failed to qualify
2013–14	34	18	13	-	3	135	135	39	4th of 6 Fred Fox; 5th of 11 NSJHL	Won Div. Semifinal 4–2, Leafs; Lost Div. Finals 1–4, Blazers
2014–15	34	21	10	-	3	176	129	45	3rd of 6 Fred Fox; 5th of 11 NSJHL	Lost Div. Semifinal 3–4, Leafs

Season	GP	W	OTW; SOW	T/OTL	L	GF	GA	P	Results	Playoffs
2015–16	34	14	4	2	14	-	-	52	3rd of 6 Fred Fox; 5th of 11 NSJHL	Lost Div. Semifinal 1–4, (Blazers)
2016–17	34	16	4	1	13	163	142	57	4th of 6 Fred Fox; 5th of 11 NSJHL	Lost Div. Semifinal 3–4, (Maple Leafs)
2017–18	34	26	-	2	6	203	133	54	1st of 6 Fred Fox; 1st of 11 NSJHL	Won Div. Semifinal 4–1, (Maple Leafs); Won Div. Final, 4–1 (Colts); Lost League Finals 0–4 (Jr. Miners) advance to Don Johnson as Jr. Miners are Host
2018–19	32	23	5	2	2	201	98	50	1st of 6 Fred Fox; 2nd of 12 NSJHL	Won Div. Semifinal 4–0, (Colts); Lost Div. Final, 2–4 (Blazers)
2019–20	32	23	8	0	1	179	123	47	1st of 6 Fred Fox; 3rd of 12 NSJHL	Won Div. Semifinal -–-, (Colts); Playoffs halted due to covid
2020–21	4	2	1	0	1	16	8	5	Season lost to COVID-19 pandemic	
2021–22	17	10	0	0	0	79	59	20	4th of 6 Fred Fox; 7th of 12 NSJHL	Won Div. Semifinal 3–0, (Elks); Won Div. Final, 4-1 (Colts); L League Finals, 2-4 (Bulldogs)
2022–23	30	20	7	2	1	146	109	43	2nd of 6 Fred Fox; 4th of 12 NSJHL	Lost Div. Semifinal 3–4, (Privateers)
2023–24	32	22	8	1	1	133	92	46	3rd of 6 Fred Fox; 4th of 12 NSJHL	Won Div. Semifinal 4-3, (Lumberjacks)
2024–25	30	26	4	0	0	163	84	52	1st of 6 Fred Fox; 2nd of 112 NSJHL	Lost Div. Semifinal 1-4, (Lumberjacks)

== Don Johnson Cup ==
Eastern Canada Jr B Championships

Year	Round Robin	Record	Standing	Semifinal	Bronze Medal; Game	Gold Medal; Game
2007	W, Cumberland Blues 7–2; W, Central Cataracts 11–2; W, Madawaska (Que) 12–4; W, OT, Kensington Vipers 6–5	4–0–0	1st of 5	W, Central; Cataracts 8–3	n/a	W, Cumberland Blues 2–0; Don Johnson Cup; Champions
2012	W, Mount Pearl Blades, 9–0; W, Moncton Vitos, 5–2; OTW, Kensington Vipers 2–3; L, St, Johns Caps 2–3	3–1–0	2nd of 5	W, Kensington; Vipers 1–2	n/a	L, Moncton Vitos, 1–2
2018	OTL, Kameron Jr. Miners, 4–5; L, Western Red Wings, 6–8; OTW, Moncton Vitos, 4–3; OTL, Mount Pearl Jr. Blades, 3–4	1–1–2	4th of 5	L, Kameron Jr. Miners, 2–5	n/a	n/a

Preceded by Bay Ducks	Don Johnson Cup Champions; 2007	Succeeded by Windsor Royals
