= O'Leary Eagles =

- City: O'Leary, Prince Edward Island, Canada
- League: Island Junior Hockey League
- Operated: c. 1996-2002
- Home arena: O'Leary Community Sports Centre
- Colours: HOME: White/Red/Black AWAY: Red/White/Black
- Owner: Warren Ellis
- Head coach: Forbes Kennedy

The O'Leary Eagles were a Canadian Junior ice hockey club from O'Leary, Prince Edward Island. They were members of the Island Junior Hockey League and were 2002 Don Johnson Cup Maritime Junior B champions.

== History ==
In their final year of operation, the O'Leary Eagles led the Island Junior Hockey League with a record of 25 wins, 3 losses, and 2 overtime losses. In the playoffs, they defeated the Kings County Sharks, Summerside Red Wings, and Sherwood Falcons to win the IJHL championship for the only time and for entry into the 2002 Don Johnson Cup.

As host and champion in the Don Johnson Cup, the Eagles finished in first place overall in the round robin and received a berth into the tournament final. In the final, the Eagles defeated the Nova Scotia Junior Hockey League's Strait Pirates 5–2 to win Prince Edward Island's first ever Don Johnson Cup. The O'Leary Eagles Franchise had played their last game; They have not returned to the League after their Island / Don Johnson Cup Championship in 2002.

== Season-by-season record ==
Season	GP	W	L	T	OTL	GF	GA	P	Results	Playoffs
2001-02	30	25	3	0	2	227	95	52	1st IJHL	Won League, Won DJC

Preceded by Windsor Royals	Don Johnson Cup Champions; 2002	Succeeded by Sackville Blazers
