= St. John's Jr. Caps =

St. John's Junior Caps
- City: St. John's, Newfoundland and Labrador, Canada
- League: St. John's Junior Hockey League
- Founded: 1993
- Home arena: Mary Brown's Centre
- Colours: Red and White
- General manager: Paul Mills
- Head coach: Steve Callahan

The St. John's Junior Caps are a Canadian Junior ice hockey club from St. John's, Newfoundland and Labrador. They are members of the St. John's Junior Hockey League and are the 2024 St. John's Junior Hockey League Champions.

== History ==
The St. John's Junior Caps were founded in 1993 when the St. John's Jr. 50's, a veteran club with a history in Junior A and winning the Don Johnson Cup, ceased operations.

In 2009, despite losing the league final to the Mount Pearl Jr. Blades, the Junior Caps found themselves in the Veitch Memorial Trophy playoffs for the Newfoundland Junior B Championship as representatives. After beating the Deer Lake Jr. Red Wings 8-2, tying Mount Pearl 3-3, and beating the Central West Junior Hockey League Champion Central Jr. Cataracts 5-3, the Jr. Caps found themselves in the Veitch final with the best record against the Jr. Cataracts. The Jr. Caps won their second ever Veitch Memorial Trophy by a score of 7-4. With this they were qualified for the 2009 Don Johnson Cup in Bay Roberts, Newfoundland and Labrador. They started the tournament by defeating the host Conception Bay North Jr. Stars 6-4. They then lost 6-3 to the Island Junior Hockey League's Sherwood Falcons. They then lost to the Nova Scotia Junior Hockey League's Cumberland County Blues 7-4. They closed out the round robin with an 8-1 shellacking of the Jr. Cataracts who were in the tournament by virtue of New Brunswick opting out. With a 2-2-0 record, they finished third and drew Cumberland County in the semi-final. The Jr. Caps won the game 3-2 in double overtime. On April 19, the Junior Caps played the Sherwood Falcons for the Don Johnson Cup. The Junior Caps won 3-2 to win their first ever Maritime Junior B Championship.

In 2010, the Junior Caps won the SJJHL title and the Veitch Memorial Trophy. They lost out in the semi-final of the Don Johnson Cup to the Cumberland County Blues, who would move on to win the entire tournament.

in 2013, the Junior Caps had a season record of 25-3-0 and a 12-0 playoff record.

== March 7th Caps-Breakers penalties ==
On March 7th, 2026, during a game between the St. John's Junior Caps and the Southern Shore Junior Breakers, the referees handed out 568 minutes of penalties. This exceeds the record for most penalties minutes given in an NHL game, which was 419. The league issued a statement on the 8th condemning the behavior. The game had to end early due to the excessive amount of penalties.

== Season-by-season record ==
Season	GP	W	L	T	OTL	GF	GA	P	Results	Playoffs
1993-94	23	0	22	1	-	89	219	1	4th SJJHL	
1994-95	34	19	14	1	-	214	197	39	3rd SJJHL	
1995-96	33	21	9	3	-	219	172	45	2nd SJJHL	
1996-97	30	19	10	1	-	138	127	39	1st SJJHL	
1997-98	34	10	23	1	-	161	201	21	5th SJJHL	
1998-99	33	23	6	4	-	152	105	50	2nd SJJHL	Won League
1999-00	37	16	18	3	-	131	171	35	8th SJJHL	
2000-01	31	16	12	2	1	126	125	35	7th SJJHL	
2001-02	33	19	12	2	-	150	122	40	2nd SJJHL	Won League, Won VMT
2002-03	29	6	20	1	2	113	189	15	7th SJJHL	
2003-04	29	13	14	1	1	170	161	28	4th SJJHL	
2004-05	29	14	13	2	0	151	161	30	5th SJJHL	
2005-06	29	12	16	0	1	140	151	25	7th SJJHL	
2006-07	29	8	19	1	1	115	160	18	6th SJJHL	
2007-08	28	14	13	1	0	123	140	29	4th SJJHL	
2008-09	28	17	9	1	1	141	107	36	2nd SJJHL	Lost Final, Won VMT, Won DJC
2009-10	28	24	3	1	0	151	68	49	1st SJJHL	Won League, Won VMT
2010-11	28	22	4	-	2	172	104	46	1st SJJHL	
2011-12	28	23	5	-	0	159	80	46	1st SJJHL	Won League, Won VMT
2012-13	28	25	3	-	0	194	72	50	1st SJJHL	Won League, Won VMT
2013-14	28	19	8	-	1	111	81	39	2nd SJJHL	Won Quarters, 4-1 (Celtics); Lost Semi's, 1-4 (Breakers)
2014-15	28	18	8	-	2	124	99	38	3rd SJJHL	Won Quarters, 3-0 (Breakers); Won Semi-finals, 4-0 (Renegades); Won League, 4-2 (Capitals)
2015-16	28	17	9	-	2	117	100	36	4th SJJHL	Lost Quarters, 1-3 (Capitals)
2016-17	28	20	7	-	1	127	85	41	2nd of 8 SJJHL	Win Quarters, 3-0 (North Jr. Stars); Lost Semifinals 1-4 (Capitals)
2017-18	27	11	12	4	0	96	113	26	5TH of 8 SJJHL	Lost Quarters, 0-3 (Stars)
2018-19	27	7	16	2	2	101	147	18	8TH of 8 SJJHL	Lost Quarters, 0-3 (Blades)
2021-22	23	13	9	=	1	112	88	27	4TH of 8 SJJHL	lost SemiFinals, 0-3 (Stars)
2022-23	28	18	9	=	1	127	87	37	3rd of 8 SJJHL	Won Quarterfinals, 3-0 (Eagles); Won Semifinals 4-1 (Blades); Lost League Finals 0-4 (Jr. Stars)
2023-24	28	21	5	2	=	135	80	44	2nd of 8 SJJHL	Won Quarterfinals, 3-1 (Renegades); Won Semifinals, 4-1 (Eagles); Won League Finals 4-1 (Jr. Stars); Taylor Cup Champions advance to Don Johnson Memorial Cup
2024-25	28	21	6	1	=	113	81	43	1st of 8 SJJHL	Won Quarterfinals, 3-0 (Warriors); Won Semifinals, 4-0 (Celtics); Lost League Finals 3-4 (Jr. Stars)
2025-26	28	25	3	0	=	151	63	50	1st of 8 SJJHL	Won Quarterfinals, 3-0 (Breakers); Won Semifinals, 4-3 (Warriors); Won League Finals 4-2 (Jr. Stars); Taylor Cup Champions advance to Don Johnson Memorial Cup

== Don Johnson Cup ==
Eastern Canada Jr B Championships

Year	Round Robin	Record	Standing	SemiFinal	Bronze Medal Game	Gold Medal Game
2015	L, Glace Bay - NS 1-5; SOL, Tyne Valley - PEI 2-3; L, Kensington - PEI 2-5; W, Moncton - NB 2-0	1-2-1	4th of 5	L, Moncton - NB-2-6	not competed	n/a
2013	W, Kensington - PEI 5-3; L, Moncton - NB 2-3; L, Fredericton - NB 1-7; OTW, Sackville - NS 3-2	2-2-0	3rd of 5	OTL, Sackville - NS 5-6	not competed	n/a
2012; HOST	W, Mount Pearl - Nfld 8-6; W, Moncton - NB 4-1; W, Kensington - PEI 2-1; W, East Hants - NS 3-2	4-0-0	1st of 5	OTL, Moncton - NB 4-5	not competed	n/a
2010	SOL, Cumberland - NS 2-3; L, Kensington - PEI 3-4; L, Bay - NS 4-6; W, Charlotte County - NB 11-2	2-2-0	3rd of 5	L, Cumberland - NS 2-3	not competed	n/a
2009	W, Conception Bay - Nfld 6-4; L, Sherwood - PEI 3-6; L, Cumberland - NS 4-7; W, Central - Nfld 8-1	2-2-0	3rd of 5	W, Cumberland - NS 6-5	not competed	W, Sherwood - PEI 3-2; Don Johnson Champions
2024	L, Mount Pearl - Nfld (host) 2-5; L, Antigonish - NS 0-8; L, Kensington - PEI 0-4; W, Kent - NB 3-2	1-0-3-0	4th of 5	L, Antigonish - NS 0-8	not competed	tbd
2026						

Preceded by Windsor Royals	Don Johnson Cup Champions; 2009	Succeeded by Cumberland County Blues
