= Mount Pearl Jr. Blades =

- City: Mount Pearl, Newfoundland and Labrador, Canada
- League: St. John's Junior Hockey League
- Division: City Division
- Founded: 1980
- Home arena: The Glacier
- Colours: Blue, Red and White
- General manager: Wally O’Neill
- Head coach: Adam Collins

Franchise history
- 1980–2013: Mount Pearl Jr. Blades
- 2013–2015: Mount Pearl Wild
- 2015-Present: Mount Pearl Jr. Blades

The Mount Pearl Jr. Blades are a Canadian Junior ice hockey club from Mount Pearl, Newfoundland and Labrador. They are members of the St. John's Junior Hockey League, are a former Junior A team, and won the Don Johnson Cup Maritime Junior B championship in 1986.

== History ==
Prior to 1980, junior hockey in St. John's was for the most part a Juvenile-level recreation league. Every year, an all-star team was drafted from the city and named the St. John's Jr. Capitals, after their senior team the St. John's Capitals, to compete against teams from across the province for the Veitch Memorial Trophy at either the Junior A or B level.

In 1980, the St. John's Junior Hockey League was organized and a legitimate Junior B league was formed. The winner of this league, not an all-star team, would represent the city in provincial and inter-provincial events. One of the founding members of this league was the Mount Pearl Jr. Blades. The Blades take their name from the Mount Pearl Blades Senior Hockey Team.

In 1986, the Blades would win their league, the Provincial Veitch Memorial Trophy, and go on to win the Don Johnson Cup as Maritime Junior B Champions in Kensington, Prince Edward Island.

In 1989, the entire league would retract by half and the league, including the Blades, made the jump to Junior A. After two years of the league being overwhelmed at the national level by the champions of other leagues, the league and its teams returned to Junior B.

The 1995-96 season saw the team set a club record for fewest wins in a season, with only two. In 1996–97, the team withdrew from the league to due its lack of competitiveness. The team returned to the league in 1998–99 and has been successful and competitive ever since.

The Blades would be league champions in 1986, 2003, 2007, 2009, 2018, and 2022. Their only Veitch Memorial Trophy as Newfoundland Champions and Don Johnson Cup as Atlantic Champions would come in 1986.

== Season-by-season record ==
Season	GP	W	L	T	OTL	GF	GA	P	Results	Playoffs
1980–81	32	13	14	5	—	156	160	31	4th SJJHL	
1981–82	32	15	15	2	—	174	157	32	3rd SJJHL	Lost semi-final
1982–83	33	9	19	5	—	161	248	23	3rd SJJHL	Lost final
1983–84	40	17	18	5	—	255	269	39	4th SJJHL	Lost semi-final
1984–85	36	23	9	4	—	215	174	50	2nd SJJHL	
1985–86	28	26	0	2	—	292	104	54	1st SJJHL	Won League, won VMT, won DJC
1986–87	30	15	11	4	—	170	148	34	4th SJJHL	Lost semi-final
1987–88	31	6	21	4	—	148	249	16	4th SJJHL	DNQ
1988–89	42	20	20	2	—	239	238	42	4th SJJHL	
1989–90	36	9	23	4	—	166	212	22	3rd SJJHL	
1990–91	34	21	13	0	—	203	174	42	2nd SJJHL	
1991–92	27	5	21	1	—	95	176	11	4th SJJHL	
1992–93	38	11	28	0	—	161	257	22	4th SJJHL	
1993–94	24	12	11	1	—	171	164	25	3rd SJJHL	
1994–95	34	16	17	1	—	203	155	33	4th SJJHL	
1995–96	32	2	29	1	—	93	235	5	5th SJJHL	
1996–97	24	6	17	1	—	107	153	13	5th SJJHL	Withdrew Mid-season
1997–98	Did Not Participate									
1998–99	33	11	21	1	—	148	206	23	7th SJJHL	
1999–00	37	20	14	3	—	197	184	43	3rd SJJHL	
2000–01	31	19	6	3	3	181	125	44	2nd SJJHL	
2001–02	33	15	14	4	—	163	141	34	6th SJJHL	
2002–03	29	22	5	0	1	163	104	45	1st SJJHL	Won League
2003–04	29	13	13	0	3	130	138	29	3rd SJJHL	
2004–05	28	19	7	1	1	173	140	40	1st SJJHL	
2005–06	29	16	11	2	0	168	130	34	3rd SJJHL	
2006–07	29	22	7	0	0	192	106	44	1st SJJHL	Won League
2007–08	28	17	8	3	0	140	95	37	1st SJJHL	
2008–09	28	18	7	3	0	122	92	39	1st SJJHL	Won League
2009–10	28	21	6	1	0	166	107	43	3rd SJJHL	
2010–11	28	19	8	—	1	124	110	39	2nd SJJHL	
2011–12	28	22	4	—	2	177	105	46	2nd SJJHL	
2012–13	28	12	14	—	2	138	144	26	4th SJJHL	Lost final
Mount Pearl Wild
2013–14	28	12	13	—	3	96	105	27	6th SJJHL	Lost quarters, 0–4 (Breakers)
2014–15	28	5	21	—	2	74	158	12	8th SJJHL	Lost quarters, 0–3 (Capitals)
2015–16	28	18	9	—	1	127	85	37	3rd SJJHL	Won quarters, 3–0 (Jr. Celtics); Lost semifinals, 1–4 (Capitals)
2016–17	27	16	8	—	3	118	98	36	3rd of 8 SJJHL	Lost quarters, 1–3 (Flyers)
2017–18	26	24	1	—	1	154	66	50	1st of 8 SJJHL	Won quarters, 3–0 (Eagles); Won semifinals, 4–0 (Stars); Won League 4–1 (Renegades); SJJHL Champions; Advance to Don Johnson Cup
2018–19	28	23	1	1	1	169	86	48	1st of 8 SJJHL	Won quarters, 3–0 (Jr. Caps); Won semifinals, 4–0 (Flyers); Lost League Finals 3–4 (Renegades)
2018–19	28	23	1	1	1	169	86	48	1st of 8 SJJHL	Won quarters, 3–0 (Jr. Caps); Won semifinals, 4–0 (Flyers); Lost League Finals 3–4 (Renegades)
2021–22	22	15	4	—	3	107	66	33	2nd of 8 SJJHL	Won semifinals, 3-1 (Renegades); Won finals 4-3 (Stars); SJJHL Champions
2022–23	28	20	5	—	3	124	83	43	2nd of 8 SJJHL	Won quarterfinals, 3-0 (Warriors); Lost semifinals, 1-4 (Jr. Caps)
2023–24	27	22	3	2	-	115	63	46	1st of 8 SJJHL	Won quarterfinals, 3-0 (Jr. Breakers); Lost Semifinals, 2-4 (Stars) advance to Don Johnson as HOST
2024–25	28	16	10	2	-	122	89	34	4th of 8 SJJHL	Lost quarterfinals, 0-3 (Jr. Breakers)
2025–26	28	17	9	2	-	128	88	36	4th of 8 SJJHL	Won quarterfinals, 3-0 (Renegades); Lost semifinals, 1-4 (Stars)

== Don Johnson Cup ==
Eastern Canada Jr B Championships

Year	Round Robin	Record	Standing	Semifinal	Bronze Medal Game	Gold Medal Game
1986	— — —	— — —	— — —	— — —	— — —	Don Johnson Cup Champions
2003; HOST	L, Sackville Blazers 1–5 ?, Sherwood 0–0 ?, St. John Jr Celtics ?, Oromocto	?–?–?	2 of 5	W, Sherwood	n/a	L, Sackville Blazers 4–6; Silver Medalists
2018	OTW, Moncton Vito's 5–4; SOW, Western Red Wings 6–5; L, Kameron Jr. Miners 0–3; OTW, East Hants Penguins 5–4	3–0–1	3rd of 5	W, Western Red Wings 5–0	n/a	Lost Kameron Jr. Miners 1–4
2022	W, Sherwood Metros 2-0; L, Antigonish Bulldogs 0-4; L, Moncton Vito's 4-5; L, Kent Coyotes 1-8	1–3–0	3rd of 5	L, Kent Coyotes 1-2	n/a	n/a
2024; HOST	W, St. John's Jr. Caps 5-2; W, Kensington Vipers 6-2; W, Kent Coyotes 3-0; L, Antigonish Bulldogs 2-5	3-0-1-0	2nd of 5	L, Kensington Vipers 2-6	— — —	— — —

Preceded by St. John's Jr. 50's	Don Johnson Cup Champions; 1986	Succeeded by St. John's Jr. 50's
