= Kensington Vipers =

- City: Kensington, Prince Edward Island, Canada
- League: Island Junior Hockey League
- Founded: 1998
- Home arena: Community Gardens Arena Complex
- Colours: Black, Red, and White
- Owner: (Canada) Tyler Gallant
- General manager: (Canada) Pat McIver
- Head coach: (Canada) Wade Waddell

The Kensington Vipers are a Canadian Junior ice hockey club from Kensington, Prince Edward Island. They are members of the Island Junior Hockey League and are 2011 and 2013 Don Johnson Memorial Cup Atlantic Junior B champions.

== Team history ==
The Kensington Vipers joined the Island Junior Hockey League in 1998 after the Kensington Granites Senior hockey team had folded and the Community Gardens arena was looking for a junior hockey client.

After sponsorship stints as "Don Clark Insurance" and "Valley Truss and Metal", a full-time sponsor was found in 2003, as Moase Plumbing and Heating assumed sponsorship.

After many underachieving years, the Vipers reached the Island Championship in 2002 but lost in the seventh game to the now defunct O'Leary Eagles. The following season, the team also lost in seven games at the finals but this time to the Sherwood Falcons.

Through the 2003–2004 season the Vipers were amongst the top of the league and remained on top through the end of the regular season and were favoured to win the PEI title. After a quick dismissal of the now relocated Evangeline Loggers of Wellington, the Vipers met their longtime rivals in the Sherwood Falcons. The Vipers won their first championship in five games on home ice before a sellout crowd, with arguably the best team they had put forth in franchise history, which included key defence Joey Wood, Matt Ramsay and Travis Gallant, forward Mitchell Jollimore, Robbie Doiron and Tim MacDougall as well as all-star goaltender Dan Corriveau.

The following season, the Vipers continued on their domination atop the Island Junior Hockey League. Kirk MacPhee had proven himself as the league's top playmaker, and former Summerside Capital Brad Doiron was added to the lineup. After gaining home ice advantage through their play in the regular season, the Vipers dismissed their opening round opponent, the Summerside Red Wings, and once again met the Falcons in the Final. After being down 3–2 in games of the best of seven, the Vipers won two in a row to defend their title in which will go down as perhaps the best IJHL final to date.

The following year the Vipers tried to go for a three peat, though they did not finish first overall in the regular season. This would prove to be a difference in the island final, as the Vipers lost the finals to Sherwood in six games and on home ice.

=== 2011 Don Johnson Cup ===
After multiple previous missed chances at the Maritime Junior B championship, the Vipers were not to be denied in 2011. Hosted by their rivals, the Montague Maniacs, the Vipers dropped their first game to them 3–2 in an overtime shootout. The IJHL champions then took on the St. John's Junior Hockey League's St. John's Jr. Celtics and beat them 9–4. The next day, the Vipers took on the New Brunswick Junior B Hockey League's Tri-County River Cats and beat them 4–1. On the final day of the round robin, the Vipers defeated the Nova Scotia Junior Hockey League's Bay Ducks to clinch second place with a 3-0-1 record and a spot in the semi-final. On April 30, the Vipers played the Ducks for the second time in two days, this time the Vipers won 4–3 in double overtime. On May 1, the Vipers got their rematch against the Maniacs in an All-PEI final. The Vipers won 3–0 to win their first Maritime Championship and the first PEI title since 2002.

=== 2025 Don Johnson Cup ===
The Vipers were scheduled to host the tournament this year but backout due to a difficult season. However, they did remain as the PEI representative being the only active sanction junior "B" team on the Island. The Don Johnson Cup also had Newfoundland junior "B" league decide not to send their representative to the tournament. A revised host (Kent Coyotes) was found and the tournament continued with three of league champions and the Nova Scotia and New Brunswick league finalists and the host team. New Brunswick's playoff finalist, Acadia Poseidon, elected not to participate leaving it a five-team championship.

=== All Time Leader Points ===
The Kensington Vipers all time point leader is Cameron Webster (GP: 156, G: 171, A:137, P: 298)

== Season-by-season record ==
Season	GP	W	L	T	OTL	GF	GA	P	Results	Playoffs
2001–02	30	14	16	0	0	148	156	28	3rd IJHL	Lost semi-final
2002–03	32	12	13	4	3	136	137	31	3rd IJHL	Lost final
2003–04	32	22	7	3	0	148	96	47	1st IJHL	Won League
2004–05	32	25	6	1	0	171	107	51	1st IJHL	Won League
2005–06	32	24	8	-	0	167	108	48	1st IJHL	Lost final
2006–07	32	20	7	-	5	192	135	45	2nd IJHL	Won League
2007–08	40	28	12	-	0	209	145	56	2nd IJHL	Won League
2008–09	40	27	10	-	3	193	125	57	2nd IJHL	Lost final
2009–10	40	31	7	-	2	216	126	64	1st IJHL	Won League
2010–11	40	29	10	-	1	201	136	59	1st IJHL	Won League; Won Don Johnson Cup
2011–12	30	19	7	-	4	147	106	42	1st IJHL	Won League
2012–13	26	19	6	-	1	149	74	39	1st IJHL	Won League; Won Don Johnson Cup
2013–14	32	25	5	-	2	204	130	52	1st IJHL	Won League
2014–15	32	23	7	-	2	170	102	48	1st IJHL	Won semi-final, 4–0 (Falcons); Won League Final, 4–0 (Red Wings); League champions
2015–16	32	21	9	-	2	148	117	44	1st IJHL	Won semi-final, 4–1 (Maniacs); Won League Final 4–3; League champions
2016–17	32	20	7	-	5	136	110	45	1st IJHL	Won semi-final, 4–3 (Maniacs); Lost League Finals 3–4 (Red Wings)
2017–18	36	14	16	-	6	138	145	34	3rd IJHL	Lost semi-final, 3–4 (Metros)
2018–19	36	25	11	-	0	147	91	50	2nd of 4 IJHL	Won semi-final, 4–1 (Metros); Lost League Finals 1–4 (Red Wings)
2019–20	34	16	15	-	3	98	119	35	2nd of 4 IJHL	Playoffs Cancelled due to covid
2021–21	Cancelled due to covid									
2021–22	23	13	10	-	-	77	72	26	3rd of 4 IJHL	Lost semi-final, 2–4 (Metros)
2022–23	29	15	14	-	1	94	95	31	3rd of 4 IJHL	Lost semi-final, 2–4 (Metros)
2023–24	24	14	8	-	2	102	76	30	2nd of 7 NBJHL	Won Final, 4-0 (Metros) (Advance to Don Johnson Cup)
2024–25	24	17	0	4	3	118	77	37	1st of 5 NBJHL	Default PEI Champions (Advance to Don Johnson Cup)

== Don Johnson Memorial Cup ==
Eastern Canada Jr B Championships

Year	Round Robin	Record	Standing	Semifinal	Br. Med. Game	Gold Medal Game
2025	L, Capstone-NS 2-5; L, Kent-NB-Host 1-4; L, Cap-Pele-NB 0-2; L, Antigonish-NS 1-5	0-0-4-0	5th of 5	did not qualify	n/a	n/a
2024	W, Kent-NB 4-3; L, Mount Pearl-Host 2-6; W, St. John's Jr. Caps 4-0; OTL, Antigonish-NS 3-4	2-0-1-1	3rd of 5	Won; Mount Pearl Jr. Blades; 6-2	n/a	Lost; Antigonish-NS; 2-3
2023	W, Antigonish Bulldogs- NS 4-2; L, Cornerbrook Stars- NFLD 2-6; W, Kent Koyotes- NB 4-1; W, Liverpool Privateers- NS 5-2	3-1-0	1st of 5	W, Liverpool - NS 2-1	n/a	L, Antigonish - NS 3-4
2019; HOST	L, Western Red Wings - PEI 3-5; E, CBR Renegades - NFLD 5-4; L, Sackville Blazers - NS 2-3; W, Moncton Vito's - NB 2-1	2-2-0	3rd of 5	W, Moncton Vito's - NB 6-3	n/a	OTL, Western Red Wings - PEI 1-2; Runner ups
2016	W, Moncton - NB 3-1; L, Avalon - NFLD 2-5; L, Cornerbrook - NFLD 3-6; L, Valley - NS 1-3	1-3-0	5th of 5	n/a	n/a	n/a
2015	W, Tyne Valley - PEI 6-3; L, Moncton - NB 2-4; W, St. John's -Nfld 5-2; L, Glace Bay - NS 0-2	2-2-0	3rd of 5	L, Glace Bay - NS-0-1	n/a	n/a
2014	L, Charlotte County - NB 6-8; W, Avalon - Nfld 6-2; OTW, Sackville - NS 4-3; W, Fredericton - NB 3-1	3-1-0	3rd of 6	OTL Sackville - NS 5-6	n/a	n/a
2013	L, St. John's - Nfld 3-5; W, Sackville - NS 6-1; L, Moncton - NB 4-6; W, Fredericton - NB 5-1	2-2-0	4th of 5	W Moncton - NB 5-2	n/a	W, Sackville - NS 4-3; Don Johnson Champions
2012	W, Moncton - NB 5-2; W, Mount Pearl -Nfld 7-0; L, St. John's -Nfld 1-2; OTL, East Hants - NS 2-3	2-1-1	3rd of 5	L, East Hants - NS 1-2	n/a	n/a
2011	OTL, Montague - PEI 2-3; W, St. John's - Nfld 9-4; W, Tri-County -NB 4-1; W, Bay - NS 9-6	3-0-1	2nd of 5	2OTW, Bay - NS 4-3	n/a	W, Montague - PEI 3-0; Don Johnson Champions
2010	W, Charlotte County - NB 8-3; W, St. John's - Nfld 4-3; L, Cumberland County - NS 2-7; L, Bay - NS 6-0	2-2-0	3rd of 5	L, Bay - NS 3-4	n/a	n/a

Preceded by Cumberland County Blues	Don Johnson Cup Champions; 2011	Succeeded by Moncton Vito's
Preceded by Moncton Vito's	Don Johnson Memorial Cup Champions; 2013	Succeeded by Casselman Vikings
