= Sackville Blazers =

- City: Lower Sackville, Nova Scotia, Canada
- League: Nova Scotia Junior Hockey League
- Division: Fred Fox
- Founded: 1982
- Home arena: Sackville Arena
- Colours: black, orange and white
- General manager: Stan Bowman
- Head coach: Joel Quenneville
- Captain: Matthew Munro

The Sackville Blazers are a Canadian Junior ice hockey team from Lower Sackville, Nova Scotia. The Blazers play in the Nova Scotia Junior Hockey League and are the only team in history to have won three consecutive Don Johnson Cups as Maritime Junior B Champions.

== History ==
The Sackville Blazers became a reality for the 1982/83 season. This came after seven years of hard work to gain entry into Junior hockey for Sackville. Starting with the 1997/98 season, the Blazers have had a continuous run of finishing first overall season after season.

The Sackville Blazers' Maritime dynasty began with the 2002–03 season. After winning the NSJBHL Championship, the Blazers went on to the Don Johnson Cup. After finishing first in the round robin with winds including 7–3 over the St. John's Junior Hockey League's St. John's Jr. Celtics, 6–1 over the Island Junior Hockey League's Sherwood Falcons, and 5–1 over the host Mt. Pearl Jr. Blades, the Blazers received a bye directly into the final. Sackville met Mt. Pearl again and dispatched them 6–4 to win their first Maritime Junior B Championship.

In 2004, the Blazers won their second straight NSJBHL title to move on to the Don Johnson Cup again. Starting off with a 6–2 loss to the Island Junior Hockey League's Kensington Vipers, the Blazers needed to win their final two games to guarantee another shot at the Cup. The Blazers knocked off the St. John's Junior Hockey League's Conception Bay North Jr. Stars and the host Antigonish Bulldogs to clinch a spot in the semi-final. In the semi-final, they again defeated Conception Bay North 7–2 and in the final they avenged their only loss with a 3–2 win over Kensington to win their second straight Don Johnson Cup.

In 2005, the Blazers again won their league championship, their third in consecutive years. They entered the Don Johnson Cup as one of only three teams to have won two consecutive titles (Antigonish Bulldogs and St. John's Jr. 50's begin the other two) with an opportunity to make history. The Blazers kicked off the tournament with a 6–1 romp over the Kensington Vipers and a 10–3 demolishing of the St. John's League's Trinity Placentia Flyers. In their final round robin game, they dropped a win to the host Strait Pirates and lost their bye to the tournament final. In the semi-final, the Blazers again beat Trinity Placentia 4–2 and in the final they avenged their loss to Strait 1–0 to clinch their third consecutive Don Johnson Cup—the only team in history to win three in a row.

In 2012–13, the Blazers would finish the season in second place with a record of 20–12–2. The Blazers would win the Nova Scotia playoffs and move on to the Don Johnson Memorial Cup in Moncton, New Brunswick. The Blazers finished second in the round robin with a record of two wins, a loss, and a regulation tie. The Blazers started the tournament with a 5–4 win over the New Brunswick Junior B Hockey League's Fredericton Caps. The next game, the Blazers lost 6–1 to the Island Junior Hockey League's Kensington Vipers. In their third game, the Blazers lost 3–2 in overtime to the St. John's Junior Hockey League's St. John's Jr. Caps. In their final round robin game, Sackville defeated the host Mocton Vito's 4–3. In the semi-final, the Blazers avenged their earlier overtime loss to the St. John's Jr. Caps by defeating them 6–5 in overtime. Sackville would drop the final to the Kensington Vipers in a close 4–3 decision.

== Season-by-season record ==
Season	GP	W	L	T	OTL	GF	GA	P	Results	Playoffs
1982-83	28	18	8	2	-	--	--	38	1st MLJBHL	Won League
1983-88	Statistics Are Missing									
1988-89	29	26	3	0	0	--	--	52	1st MLJBHL	
1989-90	30	19	11	0	0	191	160	38	2nd MLJBHL	
1990-91	30	16	12	2	0	168	152	34	2nd MLJBHL	
1991-92	28	17	9	0	2	175	162	36	2nd MLJBHL	
1992-93	Leave of Absence									
1993-94	30	14	13	3	-	172	178	31	3rd NSJBHL	
1994-95	31	12	17	2	-	144	167	26	5th NSJBHL	
1995-96	32	10	21	0	1	119	178	21	9th NSJBHL	
1996-97	32	22	8	2	0	203	137	46	1st NSJBHL	
1997-98	33	23	6	4	0	194	98	50	1st NSJBHL	
1998-99	32	27	4	1	0	174	91	55	1st NSJBHL	
1999-00	32	22	7	2	1	152	104	47	1st NSJBHL	
2000-01	34	26	5	3	0	195	105	55	2nd NSJBHL	
2001-02	34	27	3	2	2	225	102	58	1st NSJBHL	
2002-03	32	26	5	0	1	192	109	53	2nd NSJBHL	Won League, Won DJC
2003-04	32	26	5	0	1	192	109	53	1st NSJBHL	Won League, Won DJC
2004-05	32	25	5	2	0	193	96	52	1st NSJBHL	Won League, Won DJC
2005-06	34	31	2	1	0	198	100	63	1st NSJBHL	
2006-07	34	21	10	1	2	130	114	45	2nd NSJHL	
2007-08	34	16	18	0	0	117	118	32	7th NSJHL	
2008-09	34	17	15	1	1	126	139	36	5th NSJHL	
2009-10	34	17	14	2	1	149	136	37	6th NSJHL	
2010-11	34	14	19	-	1	133	154	29	5th, Fred Fox Div; 7th NSJHL	Did not qualify
2011-12	34	16	15	-	3	139	154	35	4th, Fred Fox Div; 6th NSJHL	Lost Div. Semi-Final, ?-? (Ducks)
2012-13	34	20	12	-	2	127	119	42	1st, Fred Fox Div; 2nd NSJHL	Won Div. Semi-Final, 4–1 (Leafs); Won Div. Finals, 4–3 (Elks); Won LEAGUE Finals, 4–2 (Pirates)
2013-14	34	23	10	-	1	127	175	47	2nd, Fred Fox Div; 3 of 11 NSJHL	Won Div. Semi-Final, 4–2 (Ducks); Won Div. Finals, 4–1 (Penguins); Won LEAGUE Finals, 4–3 (Miners)
2014-15	34	26	7	-	1	215	130	53	1st, Fred Fox Div; 2 of 11 NSJHL	Won Div. Semi-Final, 4–2 (Privateers); Lost Div. Finals, 2–4 (Maple Leafs)

Season	GP	W	OTW/SOW	T/OTL	L	GF	GA	P	Results	Playoffs
2015-16	34	22	2	3	8	-	-	71	2nd of 6 Fred Fox; 3rd of 11 NSJHL	Won Div Semifinal, 4–1 (Penguins); Lost Div. Finals, 3–4 (Leafs)
2016-17	34	16	3	3	12	142	127	57	5th of 6 Fred Fox; 6th of 11 NSJHL	did not qualify
2017-18	34	15	-	3	16	123	138	33	5th of 6 Fred Fox; 8th of 11 NSJHL	did not qualify
2018-19	32	22	-	1	9	155	108	45	5th of 6 Fred Fox; 8th of 11 NSJHL	Won Div Semifinal, 4–1 (Privateers); Won Div Final, 4–2 (Penguins); Won LEAGUE Finals, 4-2 (Pirates)
2019-20	32	22	3	0	7	162	101	47	1st of 6 Fred Fox; 3rd of 12 NSJHL	Won Div Semifinal, 4–2 (Colts); Playoffs cancelled - covid
2020-21	11	9	0	0	2	62	27	18	2nd of 6 Fred Fox; 4th of 12 NSJHL	Won Div Semifinal, 4–0 (Leafs); Lost Div Finals, 2-4 (Penguins)
2021-22	22	14	1	0	7	87	64	18	1st of 6 Fred Fox; 2nd of 12 NSJHL	Won Div Semifinal, 0–0 (Leafs); Lost Div Finals, 2-4 (Penguins)
2022-23	30	14	13	3	1	103	113	31	4th of 6 Fred Fox; 7th of 12 NSJHL	Lost Div Semifinal, 1-4 (Colts)
2024-25	30	16	12	1	0	105	111	34	3rd of 6 Fred Fox; 5th of 11 NSJHL	Lost Div Semifinal, 2-4 (Colts)

== Don Johnson Cup ==
Eastern Canada Jr B Championships

Year	Round Robin	Record	Standing	Semi-final	Championship Game
2003	W, St. John's 7–3; W, Sherwood 6–1; W, Mount Pearl 5–1 ?, Oromocto ?-?	4-0-0	1st of 4	n/a	W, Mount Pearl 6–4; Don Johnson Cup Champions
2004	L, Kensington 2–6; W, Conception Bay 9–4; W, Antigonish ?-?	2-1-0	2nd of 4	W, Conception Bay 7-2	W, Kensington 3–2; Don Johnson Cup Champions
2005	W, Kensington 6–1; W, Trinity 10–3; L, Strait 3-5	2-1-0	2nd of 4	W, Trinity 4-2	W, Strait 1–0; Don Johnson Cup Champions
2013	W, Fredericton 5–4; L, Kensington 1–6; OTL, St John's 2–3; W, Moncton 4-3	2-1-1	2nd of 5	OTW, St John's 6-5	L, Kensington 3–4; Cup Finalist
2014	W, Kensington, 8–6; L, Casselman, 5–7; W, Fredericton 5–2; W, Avalon 8-3	3-1-0	2nd of 6	OTW, Kensington 6-5	OTL, Casselman, 2–3; Cup Finalist
2019	W, CBR, 4–2; L, Moncton, 0–2; W, Kensington 3–2; L, Western 1-9	2-2-0	4th of 5	OTL, Western 0-1	

Preceded by O'Leary Eagles	Don Johnson Cup Champions; 2003, 2004, 2005	Succeeded by Bay Ducks
