= Liverpool Privateers =

- City: Liverpool, Nova Scotia, Canada
- League: Nova Scotia Junior Hockey League
- Division: Fred Fox
- Founded: 2005
- Folded: 2023
- Home arena: Queen's Place
- Colours: black, vegas gold, gold, and white
- General manager: Dave Bennett
- Head coach: Dave Marston (2018–19)

The Liverpool Privateers were a Canadian Junior ice hockey team from Liverpool, Nova Scotia. The Privateers played in the Nova Scotia Junior Hockey League and were the 2006 Don Johnson Cup Maritime Junior B Champions. They were established as the Bay Ducks, based in Upper Tantallon, Nova Scotia.

After 2022–23 season the team was moved to Bridgewater.

== History ==
Founded in 2005, as the Bay Ducks, the Privateers have been one of the more dominant teams in the Nova Scotia Junior Hockey League. In their first season, the Ducks made it all the way to the NSJHL final where they lost to the Antigonish Bulldogs. Due to Newfoundland electing not to send a champion to the 2006 Don Johnson Cup the Ducks were allowed to take the NL seed. Taking full advantage, the Ducks started the tournament with a 5–1 win over the host Kensington Vipers. They then dropped a 1–0 decision to the Island Junior Hockey League Champion Sherwood Falcons. In their final round robin game, the Ducks defeated Antigonish 5–3 to clinch first in the round robin (2–1–0) and a bye directly into the tournament final. The Ducks again met Antigonish in the final and dispatched them 5–3 to win their first and only Don Johnson Cup.

After a 22–8–4 record during the 2010–11 regular season and a second-place finish, the Ducks would win their first ever league playoff championship. At the 2011 Don Johnson Cup in Montague, Prince Edward Island, the Ducks would finish the round robin in third place with a record of two wins, a loss, and a regulation tie. The Ducks defeated the Tri County River Cats of the New Brunswick Junior B Hockey League 2–1 to open the tournament. In their second game, the Ducks defeated the St. John's Jr. Celtics of the St. John's Junior Hockey League 6–4. On the final day of the round robin, the Ducks played two games, first dropping a 9–6 decision to the Island Junior Hockey League's Kensington Vipers and finished with a 4–3 overtime loss to the host Montague Maniacs. The Ducks met the Kensington Vipers again in the tournament semi-final and dropped a 4–3 double overtime decision to them to end any hope of a second Don Johnson Cup for that season.

Prior to the commencement of the 2014–15 season the Bay Ducks relocated to Liverpool, Nova Scotia and re-branded their team name to the Privateers.

== Season-by-season record ==
Season	GP	W	L	T	OTL	GF	GA	P	Results	Playoffs
2005–06	34	17	14	2	1	149	144	37	5th NJSBHL	Lost Final, Won DJC
2006–07	34	10	20	1	3	143	186	24	8th NSJHL	
2007–08	34	7	27	0	0	115	196	14	9th NSJHL	
2008–09	34	16	15	2	1	139	144	35	6th NSJHL	Lost Quarterfinals 3–4, Blazers
2009–10	34	27	6	0	1	182	115	55	1 of 5 Fred Fox; 2nd of 10 NSJHL	Won Div. Semifinal 4–1, Royals; Won Div. Final 4–2, Elks; Lost League Final 0–4, Blues
2010–11	34	22	8	-	4	167	108	48	2 of 6 Fred Fox; 2nd of 11 NSJHL	Won Div. Semifinal 4–1, Penguins; Won Div. Final 4–3, Royals; Won League Final 4–0, Pirates
2011–12	34	25	8	-	1	144	106	51	1 of 6 Fred Fox; 1st of 11 NSJHL	Won Div. Semifinal ?-?, Blazers; Lost Div. Final 1–4, Penguins
2012–13	34	19	13	-	2	111	108	40	3 of 6 Fred Fox; 5th of 11 NSJHL	Lost Div. Semifinal 1–4, Elks
2013–14	34	20	9	-	5	135	130	45	3 of 6 Fred Fox; 4th of 11 NSJHL	Lost Div. Semifinal, 2–4 Blazers
Liverpool Privateers
2014–15	34	21	1	-	2	168	125	44	4 of 6 Fred Fox; 6th of 11 NSJHL	Lost Div. Semifinal, 2–4 (Blazers)

Season	GP	W	OTW/SOW	T/OTL	L	GF	GA	P	Results	Playoffs
2015–16	33	13	3	3	14	-	-	48	4th of 6 Fred Fox; 7th of 11 NSJHL	Lost Play In, 1–2 (Colts)
2016–17	33	19	2	3	9	146	111	64	2nd of 6 Fred Fox; 3rd of 11 NSJHL	Won Div Semifinal, 4–2 (Colts); Won Div Finals, 4–2 (Maple Leafs); Lost League Finals 2–4 (Scotians)
2017–18	34	22	-	0	12	154	135	44	3rd of 6 Fred Fox; 5th of 11 NSJHL	Lost Div Semifinal, 3–4 (Colts)
2018–19	32	19	11	1	1	167	118	40	3rd of 6 Fred Fox; 5th of 12 NSJHL	Lost Div Semifinal, 1–4 (Blazers)
2019–20	32	19	9	3	0	154	126	41	3rd of 6 Fred Fox; 6th of 12 NSJHL	Lost Div Semifinal, 2–4 (Penguins)
2020–21	12	9	3	0	0	51	36	18	1st of 6 Fred Fox; 3rd of 12 NSJHL	Lost Div Semifinal, 1–4 (Penguins)
2021–22	18	10	5	2	1	73	54	23	4th of 6 Fred Fox; 7th of 12 NSJHL	Won Div Quarterfinal, 3-0 (Maple Leafs); Lost Div SemiFinals, 3-4 (Colts)
2022–23	30	14	12	3	1	98	94	32	3rd of 6 Fred Fox; 6th of 12 NSJHL	Won Div Quarterfinal, 4-3 (Penguins); Lost Div SemiFinals, 3-4 (Colts) (Advance to Don Johnson as HOST)

== Don Johnson Cup ==
Eastern Canada Jr B Championships

Year	Round Robin	Record	Standing	Semifinal	Bronze Medal Game	Gold Medal Game
2006*	W, Kensington Vipers 5–1; L, Sherwood Falcons 0–1; W, Antigonish Bulldogs 5–3	2–1–0	1st of 4	n/a	n/a	W, Antigonish Bulldogs 5–3; Don Johnson Cup; Champions
2011	W, Tri-City River Cats 2–1; W, St John Celtics 6–4; L, Kensington Vipers 6–9; OTL, Monatgue Maniacs 4–3	2–1–1	3rd of 5	L2OT, Kensington; Vipers 3–5	n/a	n/a
2023; HOST	L, Kensington Vipers 4-5; W, CBN Jr. Stars 7-2; L, Kent Koyotes 1-4; L, Antigonish Bulldogs 3-4	1–2–0	4th of 5	tbd, Kensington; Vipers 0-0	n/a	n/a

- Advanced to Don Johnson Cup as a replacement for Newfoundland champion.

Preceded by Sackville Blazers	Don Johnson Cup Champions; 2006	Succeeded by East Hants Penguins
