= List of ice hockey teams in Nova Scotia =

The following is a list of ice hockey teams in Nova Scotia, past and present. It includes the league(s) they play for, and championships won.

== Professional ==
=== American Hockey League ===
| Team | City | Existed | Calder Cups | Notes |
|---|---|---|---|---|
| Cape Breton Oilers | Sydney | 1988-96 | 1 | Founded as the Nova Scotia Oilers in 1984; Became the Hamilton Bulldogs in 1996 |
| Nova Scotia Voyageurs | Halifax | 1971-84 | 3 | Founded in 1969 as the Montreal Voyageurs; became the Sherbrooke Canadiens in 1984 |
| Nova Scotia Oilers | Halifax | 1984-88 | 0 | Became the Cape Breton Oilers in 1988 |
| Halifax Citadels | Halifax | 1988-93 | 0 | Founded as the Fredericton Express in 1981; Became the Cornwall Aces in 1993 |

== Junior ==
=== Quebec Maritimes Junior Hockey League ===
| Team | City | Established | President's Cups | Memorial Cups | Notes |
|---|---|---|---|---|---|
| Cape Breton Eagles | Sydney | 1997 | 0 | 0 | Founded in 1979 as the Sorel Éperviers |
| Halifax Mooseheads | Halifax | 1994 | 1 | 1 | |

=== Maritime Junior A Hockey League ===
| Team | City | Established | League titles | Fred Page Cups | Royal Bank Cups | Notes |
|---|---|---|---|---|---|---|
| Amherst Ramblers | Amherst | 1968 | 1 | 0 | 0 | |
| South Shore Lumberjacks | Bridgewater | 2008 | 0 | 0 | 0 | Founded in 2004 as the Halifax Wolverines |
| Valley Wildcats | Berwick | 2013 | 0 | 0 | 0 | Founded in 1967 as the Antigonish Bulldogs |
| Truro Bearcats | Truro | 1997 | 7 | 1 | 0 | |
| Weeks Crushers | New Glasgow | 2004 | 1 | 1 | 1 | Founded in 1967 as the Halifax Lions, later Halifax Mooseheads, Dartmouth Oland Exports, Halifax Oland Exports, and Halifax Team Pepsi |
| Yarmouth Mariners | Yarmouth | 2002 | 1 | 0 | 0 | Founded in 1976 as the Cole Harbour Colts, later East Hants Penguins, and Dartmouth Scotia DQ Blizzard. |

=== Junior B Hockey Leagues ===
| League | Region | Established | Don Johnson Cups | Notes |
|---|---|---|---|---|
| Nova Scotia Junior Hockey League | Nova Scotia | 1967 | 12 | |

=== Junior C Hockey Leagues ===
| League | Region | Established | Maritime-Hockey North Junior C Championships | Notes |
|---|---|---|---|---|
| Nova Scotia Junior C Hockey League | Nova Scotia | 2002 | 5 | |

== Semi-professional, senior and amateur ==
=== Senior ===
| Team | Region | Existed | Allan Cups | Notes |
|---|---|---|---|---|
| Truro SR Bearcats | Truro, Nova Scotia | | 1 | |
| Cape Breton West Knights | Port Hood, Nova Scotia | | | |
| Pictou County Pipers | Pictou, Nova Scotia | | | |
| Antigonish SR Bulldogs | Antigonish, Nova Scotia | | | |
| East Hants SR Penguins | Lantz, Nova Scotia | | | |
| Eskasoni SR Eagles | Eskasoni, Nova Scotia | | | |
| Glace Bay SR Miners | Glace Bay, Nova Scotia | | | |
| County Islanders | Coxheath, Nova Scotia | | | |

=== University ===
| Team | City | Established | Conference titles | University Cups | Women's Titles | Notes |
|---|---|---|---|---|---|---|
| Acadia Axemen | Wolfville | ???? | 8 | 2 | N/A | Does not play CIS women's hockey, only men's hockey |
| Dalhousie Tigers | Halifax | ???? | 1 | 0 | 0 | |
| Saint Mary's Huskies | Halifax | ???? | 11 | 1 | 0 | |
| St. Francis Xavier X-Men | Antigonish | ???? | 24 | 1 | 0 | |
| CBU Capers | Sydney | ????-1996 | 0 | 0 | N/A | |

== League, regional and national championships ==
| Championship | Times won | Description |
| Calder Cup | 4 | American Hockey League champion |
| Gilles-Courteau Trophy | 1 | Quebec Maritimes Junior Hockey League champion |
| Memorial Cup | 1 | Canadian Major-Junior national champion |
| Allan Cup | 3 | Canadian senior national champion |
| Fred Page Cup | 2 | Eastern Canada Junior "A" regional championship |
| Royal Bank Cup | 1 | Canadian Junior "A" national champion |
| Don Johnson Cup | 12 | Atlantic Canada Jr B champion |
| Maritime-Hockey North Championship | 7 | Regional Junior "C" Champion |
| University Cup | 4 | CIS national men's university champion |

== See also ==
- Hockey Nova Scotia
- Coloured Hockey League
- 2000 Memorial Cup
- 2003 World Junior Ice Hockey Championships
- 2004 Women's World Ice Hockey Championships
- 2008 Men's World Ice Hockey Championships with Québec City, Québec as the co-host.
