= St. Margaret's Bay Mariners =

- City: Upper Tantallon, Nova Scotia, Canada
- League: Nova Scotia Junior Hockey League
- Operated: c. 1989-1992
- Home arena: Margaret's Bay Centre
- Owner(s): Dave Campbell

St. Margaret's Bay Mariners were a Canadian Junior ice hockey team from Upper Tantallon, Nova Scotia. The Mariners played in the Nova Scotia Junior Hockey League and were the 1990 Don Johnson Cup Maritime Junior B Champions.

== History ==
The St. Margaret's Bay Mariners joined the Nova Scotia Junior Hockey League in 1989. In 1990, Nova Scotia was hosting the Don Johnson Cup. They won their final but lost the provincials to the Sydney Millionaires, the Mariners were allowed to attend the Cup as Nova Scotia representatives. The Mariners would go on to win the entire thing, the last time the Atlantic crown would be contested in seven years.

The Mariners won their second league title in 1991 as well as the NSAHA championship, but left the league a season later after winning their third league title.

In 2005, thirteen years later, the Bay Ducks would take the Mariners' place and win Upper Tantallon another Don Johnson Cup that very season.

== Season-by-season record ==
| Season | GP | W | L | T | OTL | GF | GA | P | Results | Playoffs |
| 1989-90 | 29 | 26 | 3 | 0 | 0 | 234 | 110 | 52 | 1st NSJHL | Won League, Won DJC |
| 1990-91 | 30 | 22 | 6 | 2 | 0 | 223 | 138 | 46 | 1st NSJHL | Won League |
| 1991-92 | 28 | 17 | 8 | 1 | 2 | 182 | 137 | 37 | 1st NSJHL | Won League |

| Preceded by Sydney Millionaires | Don Johnson Cup Champions; 1990 | Succeeded by Cape Breton Alpines |
