= New Brunswick Junior Hockey League =

New Brunswick Junior Hockey League may refer to:

- New Brunswick Junior Hockey League (1969–1983)
- New Brunswick Junior Hockey League (2012)
