= Don Johnson Memorial Cup =

The Don Johnson Memorial Cup, formerly Don Johnson Cup, is the Junior B ice hockey championship for Atlantic Canada, including Nova Scotia, Newfoundland, New Brunswick, and Prince Edward Island as of 2014.

From 1982 until 1990 and 1997 until 2013, the Don Johnson Cup was emblematic of the Junior B championship of the Atlantic Provinces of Canada -- Nova Scotia, Newfoundland, New Brunswick, and Prince Edward Island.

The cup is named in honour of Don Johnson, a sports enthusiast who dedicated his efforts to the growth of hockey in Atlantic Canada. Johnson, who died in 2012, awarded the first ever Don Johnson Cup in 1982 to his own son, a player for the St. John's Jr. Celtics.

There is no National Championship for Junior B hockey in Canada, similar championships are held in Southern Ontario (Sutherland Cup), Eastern Ontario (Barkley Cup), Quebec (Coupe Dodge), and Western Canada (Keystone Cup)—leaving five teams at the end of each year with a shared claim to being the best Junior B team in Canada.

In 2025, Newfoundland and Labrador chose not to attend the tournament due to financial reasons. They were reinstated for the 2026 tournament.

== History ==
In the 1980s, Newfoundland and Labrador teams dominated the early tournaments. NL teams won five of the first seven Don Johnson Cups. In 1990, the tournament was retired, only to be resurrected a few years later.

Since 2002, the Don Johnson Cup has been dominated by teams from Nova Scotia. From 2003 until 2008, the teams of the NSJHL have won six consecutive Atlantic titles. The streak was broken in 2009 as St. John's of Newfoundland and Labrador eliminated all hopes of a seventh straight Nova Scotia crown. Going into the semi-final round of the Don Johnson Cup, the three NL teams present were 0–6 against PEI's Sherwood Falcons and NS's Cumberland County Cool Blues. In the semi-final, the third seeded St. John's Caps of the St. John's Junior Hockey League upset the second seeded Cumberland County 6–5. The Caps advanced to the final to play the Falcons and upset them 3–2 in overtime to win Newfoundland and Labrador's first Atlantic Jr. B championship in 21 years.

With the passing of Don Johnson, starting with the 2013 tournament, the trophy was renamed the Don Johnson Memorial Cup.

On April 22, 2014, the Casselman Vikings of the Eastern Ontario Junior Hockey League played in Port Hawkesbury, Nova Scotia and became the first non-Atlantic Canada team to compete at the event. The Vikings would defeat the Fredericton Jr. Caps 6–1 in their debut. The 2014 tournament would also mark the tournament being rebranded from the Atlantic Junior B Championships to the Eastern Canadian Junior B Championships. The Vikings would sweep the event with six wins and no losses. The rebranding did not last long. The 2015 championship was originally slated to take place in Arnprior, Ontario, the first to take place outside of Atlantic Canada. It was instead moved to Tyne Valley, Prince Edward Island with no Eastern Ontario team taking part.

== Champions ==
Don Johnson Memorial Cup Champions
Year	Champions	Runners-Up	Score	Host City
1982	St. John's Jr. Celtics	Kensington Bombers	4-3	Kensington, Prince Edward Island
1983	Antigonish Bulldogs	Saint John Beavers	11-4	Saint John, New Brunswick
1984	Antigonish Bulldogs	St. John's Jr. 50's	11-4	St John's, NL
1985	St. John's Jr. 50's	Antigonish Bulldogs	3-0	Antigonish, Nova Scotia
1986	Mount Pearl Jr. Blades			Kensington, Prince Edward Island
1987	St. John's Jr. 50's	Windsor Valley Jets	9-5	Fredericton, New Brunswick
1988	St. John's Jr. 50's
1989	Sydney Millionaires
1990	St. Margaret's Bay Mariners
No Competition from 1991 until 1996.
1997	Cape Breton Alpines	Windsor Royals	5-2	New Waterford, Nova Scotia
1998	Windsor Royals	Richibucto Bears	4-2	Summerside, Prince Edward Island
1999	Richibucto Bears	Bell Island Jr. Blues	10-2	Bell Island, NL
2000	Woodstock Slammers	Cape Breton Alpines	4-1	Woodstock, New Brunswick
2001	Windsor Royals	Strait Pirates		Windsor, Nova Scotia
2002	O'Leary Eagles	Strait Pirates		O'Leary, Prince Edward Island
2003	Sackville Blazers	Mount Pearl Jr. Blades		Mount Pearl, NL
2004	Sackville Blazers	Kensington Vipers		Antigonish, Nova Scotia
2005	Sackville Blazers	Strait Pirates		Port Hawkesbury, Nova Scotia
2006	Bay Ducks	Antigonish Bulldogs		Kensington, Prince Edward Island
2007	East Hants Penguins	Cumberland County Blues		Springhill, Nova Scotia
2008	Windsor Royals	Sherwood Falcons		Sherwood, Prince Edward Island
2009	St. John's Jr. Caps	Sherwood Falcons		Bay Roberts, NL
2010	Cumberland County Blues	Bay Ducks	4-1	St. Margaret's Bay, Nova Scotia
2011	Kensington Vipers	Montague Maniacs	3-0	Montague, Prince Edward Island
2012	Moncton Jr. Vito's	East Hants Penguins		St. John's, NL
2013	Kensington Vipers	Sackville Blazers		Moncton, New Brunswick
2014	Casselman Vikings	Sackville Blazers		Port Hawkesbury, Nova Scotia
2015	Moncton Jr. Vito's	Glace Bay Jr. Miners		Abrams Village, Prince Edward Island
2016	Valley Maple Leafs	Avalon Jr. Capitals		Conception Bay, NL
2017	Cap-Pele Predators	Fredericton Jr. Caps	3-2	Fredericton, NB
2018	Kameron Jr. Miners	Mount Pearl Jr. Blades	4-1	Membertou, NS
2019	Western Red Wings	Kensington Vipers	4-3 OT	Kensington, Prince Edward Island
2020	Cancelled due to the ongoing COVID-19 pandemic			Cocagne, New Brunswick
2021	Cancelled due to the ongoing COVID-19 pandemic			N/A
2022	Kent Koyotes	Moncton Vitos	5-4	Cocagne, New Brunswick
2024	Antigonish Bulldogs	Kensington Vipers	4-3	Liverpool, Nova Scotia
2025	Antigonish Bulldogs	Kensington Vipers	3-2	Mount Pearl, NL

== Recent tournaments ==
=== 2025 Don Johnson Memorial Cup ===
2025 Roll of Champions Regional Champions

- Newfoundland - Non-participant
- Nova Scotia Champion - Capstone Colts
- Nova Scotia Finalists - Antigonish Bulldogs
- Prince Edward Island - Kensington Vipers
- New Brunswick Champion - Cap Pele Knights
- Host - New Brunswick - Kent Koyotes

2025 Don Johnson Cup Round Robin
Rank	Team	League	W-OTW-OTL-L	GF	GA
1	Capstone Colts	NSJHL Champions	0-0-0-0	0	0
2	Antigonish Bulldogs	NSJHL Finalists	0-0-0-0	0	0
3	Kent Koyotes	Host	0-0-0-0	0	0
4	Kensington Vipers	IJHL	0-0-0-0	0	0
5	Cap-Pele Knights	NBJBHL Champions	0-0-0-0	0	0

2025 Round Robin

Game	Away	Score	Home	Score
April 22, 2025
1	Cap Pele Knights	-	Kent Koyotes	-
April 23, 2025
2	Capstone Colts	-	Kensington Vipers	-
3	Cap Pele Knights	-	Antigonish Jr B Bulldogs	-
4	Kensington Vipers	-	Mount Pearl Jr. Blades	6
April 25, 2024
5	Antigonish Jr B Bulldogs	2	Kent Koyotes	3 OT
6	Kensington Vipers	4	St John's Jr. Caps	0
7	Mount Pearl Jr. Blades	3	Kent Koyotes	0
April 26, 2024
8	Antigonish Jr B Bulldogs	OT4	Kensington Vipers	3
9	Kent Koyotes	2	St John's Jr. Caps	3
10	Mount Pearl Jr. Blades	2	Antigonish Jr B Bulldogs	5
April 27, 2024 Semi Finals
11	Antigonish Jr B Bulldogs	8	St John's Jr. Caps	0
12	Kensington Vipers	6	Mount Pearl Jr. Blades	2
April 28, 2024 Championship Game
13	Antigonish Jr B Bulldogs	3	Kensington Vipers	2

=== 2024 Don Johnson Memorial Cup ===
2024 Roll of Champions Regional Champions

- Newfoundland - St. John's Jr. Caps
- Nova Scotia - Antigonish Bulldogs
- Prince Edward Island - Kensington Vipers
- New Brunswick - Kent Koyotes
- Host - Newfoundland - Mount Pearl Jr. Blades

2024 Don Johnson Cup Round Robin
Rank	Team	League	W-OTW-OTL-L	GF	GA
1	Antigonish Bulldogs	NSJHL	2-1-0-1	19	8
2	Mount Pearl Jr. Blades	Host	3-0-1-0	16	9
3	Kensington Vipers	IJHL	2-0-1-1	13	13
4	St John's Jr. Caps	SJJHL	1-0-3-0	5	19
5	Kent Koyotes	NBJBHL	0-1-3-0	8	12

2024 Round Robin

Game	Away	Score	Home	Score
April 23, 2024
1	St John's Jr. Caps	2	Mount Pearl Jr. Blades	5
April 24, 2024
2	Kent Koyotes	3	Kensington Vipers	4
3	St John's Jr. Caps	0	Antigonish Jr B Bulldogs	8
4	Kensington Vipers	2	Mount Pearl Jr. Blades	6
April 25, 2024
5	Antigonish Jr B Bulldogs	2	Kent Koyotes	3 OT
6	Kensington Vipers	4	St John's Jr. Caps	0
7	Mount Pearl Jr. Blades	3	Kent Koyotes	0
April 26, 2024
8	Antigonish Jr B Bulldogs	OT4	Kensington Vipers	3
9	Kent Koyotes	2	St John's Jr. Caps	3
10	Mount Pearl Jr. Blades	2	Antigonish Jr B Bulldogs	5
April 27, 2024 Semi Finals
11	Antigonish Jr B Bulldogs	8	St John's Jr. Caps	0
12	Kensington Vipers	6	Mount Pearl Jr. Blades	2
April 28, 2024 Championship Game
13	Antigonish Jr B Bulldogs	3	Kensington Vipers	2

=== 2022 Don Johnson Memorial Cup ===
2022 Roll of Champions Regional Champions

- Newfoundland - Mount Pearl Junior Blades
- Nova Scotia -Antigonish AA Munro Jr B Bulldogs
- Prince Edward Island - A&S Scrap Metal Metros
- New Brunswick - Kent Koyotes

2022 Don Johnson Memorial Cup Teams
Team	League
Kent Koyotes	Host
Moncton Vitos	NBJBHL
Antigonish AA Munro Jr B Bulldogs	NSJHL
Mount Pearl Junior Blades	SJJHL
A&S Scrap Metal Metros	IJHL

2022 Round Robin

Game	Away	Score	Home	Score
April 26, 2022
1	Moncton Vitos	3	Kent Koyotes	2
April 27, 2022
2	Mount Pearl Junior Blades	2	A&S Scrap Metal Metros	0
3	Moncton Vitos	3	Antigonish AA Munro Jr B Bulldogs	6
4	A&S Scrap Metal Metros	4	Kent Koyotes	3
April 28, 2022
5	Antigonish AA Munro Jr B Bulldogs	4	Mount Pearl Junior Blades	0
6	A&S Scrap Metal Metros	2	Moncton Vitos	6
7	Kent Koyotes	8	Mount Pearl Junior Blades	1
April 29, 2022
8	Antigonish AA Munro Jr B Bulldogs	1	A&S Scrap Metal Metros	3
9	Mount Pearl Junior Blades	4	Moncton Vitos	5
10	Kent Koyotes	4	Antigonish AA Munro Jr B Bulldogs	1
A&S Scrap Metal Metros played 5 overagers and were eliminated from further play
April 30, 2022 Semi Finals
11	Mount Pearl Junior Blades	1	Kent Koyotes	2
12	Moncton Vitos	5	Antigonish AA Munro Jr B Bulldogs	1
May 1, 2022 Championship Game
13	Moncton Vitos	4	Kent Koyotes	5

=== 2019 Don Johnson Memorial Cup ===
2019 Roll of Champions Regional Champions

- Newfoundland - CBR Jr. Renegades
- Nova Scotia - Sackville Blazers
- Prince Edward Island - Western Red Wings
- New Brunswick - Moncton Vito's

2019 Don Johnson Cup Round Robin
Rank	Team	League	W-OTW-L-OTL	GF	GA
1	Kensington Vipers	Host	2-0-2-0	12	13
2	Western Red Wings	IJHL	3-0-0-1	24	15
3	CBR Jr. Renegades	SJJHL	1-0-0-3	17	22
4	Sackville Blazers	NSJHL	2-0-0-2	8	15
5	Moncton Vito's	NBJBHL	2-0-0-2	12	8

Round Robin
Game	Away	Score	Home	Score
April 23, 2019
1	Western Red Wings	5	Kensington Vipers	3
April 24, 2019
2	Sackville Blazers	4	CBR Renegades	2
3	Moncton Vito's	2	Western Red Wings	4
4	Kensington Vipers	5	CBR Renegades	4
April 25, 2019
5	Moncton Vito's	2	Sackville Blazers	0
6	CBR Renegades	9	Western Red Wings	6
7	Sackville Blazers	3	Kensington Vipers	2
April 26, 2019
8	CBR Renegades	7	Moncton Vito's	2
9	Western Red Wings	9	Sackville Blazers	1
10	Kensington Vipers	2	Moncton Vito's	1

Championship Round
Game	Away	Score	Home	Score
April 27, 2019
Semi Final #1	Kensington Vipers	6	Moncton Vito's	3
Semi Final #2	Sackville Blazers	0	Western Red Wings	1 (OT)
April 28, 2019
Final	Kensington Vipers	3	Western Red Wings	4 (OT)
