= Halifax Lions =

Halifax Lions

- A team operated from 1977 to 1989, now Pictou County Crushers.
- A team operated from 2008 to 2010, now Valley Wildcats.
