= Western Red Wings =

- City: Abrams Village, Prince Edward Island
- League: Island Junior Hockey League
- Founded: 2010–11
- Folded: 2022
- Home arena: Evangeline Recreation Centre
- Colours: Red, White
- Website: www.islandjuniorhockey.com/Western/

Franchise history
- 2010–2022: Western Red Wings

The Western Red Wings (officially the Arsenault's Fish Mart Western Red Wings due to sponsorship reasons) were a Canadian Junior B ice hockey team located in Abrams Village, Prince Edward Island. They competed in the Island Junior Hockey League.

== Recent history ==
The Western Red Wings historically are the second most elite team in the IJHL, behind the repetitive champions the Kensington Vipers. They continuously make the league final, but rarely win the championship. They played in the 2015 Don Johnson Memorial Cup, the Maritime Junior hockey championship, when the tournament was held in Abrams Village.

The 2016–17 season saw the Red Wings win their first playoff championships to advance to the Don Johnson Memorial Cup as the IJHL representative.

Following the 2021-22 season, the Red Wings ceased operation.

== Season-by-season record ==
Season	GP	W	L	T	OTL	GF	GA	P	Results	Playoffs
2016–17	31	17	13	-	1	135	117	35	2nd of 4 IJHL	Won semi-final, 4-0 (Metros); Won League Finals 4-3 (Vipers); IJHL Champions advance to Don Johnson Cup
2017–18	36	25	9	-	2	174	130	52	1st of 4 IJHL	Won semi-final, 4-1 (Maniacs); Won League Finals 4-2 (Metros); IJHL Champions advance to Don Johnson Cup
2018–19	36	30	4	-	2	204	96	62	1st of 4 IJHL	Won semi-final, 4-0 (Maniacs); Lost League Finals 1-4 (Vipers); IJHL Champions advance to Don Johnson Cup
2019–20	34	27	4	-	3	171	70	57	1st of 4 IJHL	Playoff cancelled due to covid-19
2020–21	23	21	2	-	0	148	54	42	1st of 4 IJHL	Won semi-final, 4-0 (Maniacs); Won League Finals 4-1 (Metros); IJHL Champions; Don Johnson Cup-cancelled

== Don Johnson Memorial Cup ==
Eastern Canada Jr B Championships

Year	Round Robin	W-OTW; L-OTL	Standing	Semifinal	Br. Med. Game	Gold Medal; Game
2015; HOST	L, Kensington Vipers 3-6; SOW, St. John's Jr. Caps 3-2; OTL, Glace Bay Jr. Miners 4-5; L, Moncton Vitos 2-7	0-1-2-1	5th of 5	Did not qualify	n/a	n/a
2017	L, Southern Shore - NFLD 7-8; W, Fredericton - NB (host) 5-2; OTL, Cap-Pelé - NB 5-6; OTL, Pictou County - NS 3-4	1-0-1-2	4th of 5	Lost, 1-4; Cap-Pelé - NB	n/a	n/a
2018	W, East Hants Penguins 8-6; SOL, Mount Pearl Jr. Blades 5-6; W, Moncton Vito's 5-2; L, Kameron Jr. Miners 1-6	2-0-1-1	2nd of 5	L, 0-5; Mount Pearl Jr. Blades	n/a	n/a
2019	W, Kensington Vipers 5-3; W, Moncton Vito's 4-2; L, CBR Renegades 6-9; W, Sackville Blazers 9-1	3-1-0-0	1st of 5	OTW, 1-0; Sackville Blazers	n/a	OTW, 4-3; Kensington Vipers; CHAMPIONS

== See also ==
- List of ice hockey teams in Prince Edward Island
