= Abram-Village =

- Rural municipality
- Abram-Village in Prince Edward Island
- Coordinates: 46°27′15.9″N 64°4′18.9″W
- Country: Canada
- Province: Prince Edward Island
- County: Prince County
- Lot: 15

Population
  - Total: 340
- Time zone: AST
  - Summer (DST): ADT
- Area code: 902

Abram-Village is a rural municipality in Prince County, Prince Edward Island, Canada.

It is located in the township of Lot 15, approximately 27 kilometres west of the city of Summerside.

Located in the "Evangeline Region", a collection of Francophone Acadian communities in the central part of Prince County, Abram-Village is famous for its Acadian Festival during late August and early September.

The Commission scolaire de langue française, which administers the province's six French public schools, is headquartered in Abram-Village.

The community is home to the Western Red Wings of the Island Junior Hockey League.

== History ==
The community is named after Abraham Arsenault, the first settler who came to the township in the 1820s.

Originally named "Abram's Village" it was officially renamed to "Abram-Village" on April 3, 2018.

== Demographics ==
Federal census population history of Abram-Village
Year	Pop.	±%
1971	313	—
1976	317	+1.3%
1981	351	+10.7%
1986	334	−4.8%
1991	311	−6.9%
1996	328	+5.5%
2001	342	+4.3%
2006	266	−22.2%
2011	267	+0.4%
2016	300	+12.4%
2021	340	+13.3%
Abram-Village's 2016 population of 272 was adjusted to 300 in 2018. Source: Statistics Canada

In the 2021 Census of Population conducted by Statistics Canada, Abram-Village had a population of 340 living in 145 of its 155 total private dwellings, a change of 13.3% from its 2016 population of 300. With a land area of 1.36 km^{2} (0.53 sq mi), it had a population density of 250.0/km^{2} (647.5/sq mi) in 2021.
