= Sackville (given name) =

Sackville is the given name of:

- Sackville Carden (1857–1930), British First World War admiral
- Sir Sackville Crowe, 1st Baronet (c. 1595–1671), English politician
- Sackville Currie (born 1955), Irish modern pentathlete
- Sackville Hamilton (1732–1818), Anglo-Irish politician
- Sackville Lane-Fox, 12th Baron Conyers (1827–1888), British peer and soldier
- Sackville Pelham, 5th Earl of Yarborough (1888–1948), British peer and soldier
- Sackville Stopford-Sackville (1840–1926), British politician
- Sackville Trevor (c. 1565–1633), Welsh sea captain and Member of Parliament
- Sackville Tufton (disambiguation)
