= Upper Sackville =

Upper Sackville may refer to the following places in Canada:

- Upper Sackville, Nova Scotia
- Upper Sackville, New Brunswick
