= Sackville Street =

Sackville Street may refer to:

- Sackville Street (Dublin) (before 1924), now known as O'Connell Street
- Sackville Street, London, England
