= Sackville Tufton (disambiguation) =

Sackville Tufton may refer to:

- Sackville Tufton (c. 1647–1721), English army colonel and Member of Parliament
- Sackville Tufton, 7th Earl of Thanet (1688–1753)
- Sackville Tufton, 8th Earl of Thanet (1733–1786)
- Sackville Tufton, 9th Earl of Thanet (1769–1825)
