= Sackville School =

Sackville School may refer to:

- Sackville School, East Grinstead, West Sussex, England, a comprehensive school
- Sackville School, Hildenborough, Kent, England, an independent school
- Sackville High School, Lower Sackville, Nova Scotia, Canada
