= Middle Sackville =

Middle Sackville may refer to the following places in Canada:

- Middle Sackville, Nova Scotia
- Middle Sackville, New Brunswick
