= Strait Pirates =

- City: Port Hawkesbury, Nova Scotia, Canada
- League: Nova Scotia Junior Hockey League
- Division: Sid Rowe
- Founded: 1964
- Home arena: Port Hawkesbury Civic Centre
- Colours: Burgundy, black, and white
- Owner: Community Owned
- General manager: Brian Tracey (2017-18)
- Head coach: Taylor Lambke (2017-18)

The Strait Pirates are a Junior B ice hockey team from Port Hawkesbury, Nova Scotia, Canada. The Pirates play at the Port Hawkesbury Civic Centre and are a member of the Nova Scotia Junior Hockey League.

The Pirates are the longest continuously running Junior B franchise in Canada.

== History ==
In 1964 a group headed by Tiger Mackie got together to form a junior hockey club in Port Hawkesbury, Nova Scotia, in an attempt to create a tenant for the new Port Hawkesbury Arena, which began construction in 1963. The team was dubbed the Strait Pirates, and were accepted into the Cape Breton Junior Hockey League (CBJHL) the following year.

For the 1966-67 season the Pirates actively recruited players from across Atlantic Canada and Quebec. The increased strength of the team led to them being kicked out of the CBJHL due to other teams being unable to compete.

In 1992 the Northcumberland Junior B Hockey League folded and the Pirates joined the Mainland Junior B Hockey League, who subsequently changed their name to the Nova Scotia Junior B Hockey League (NSJHL).

In 1998 the Pirates officially shortened their name from the Port Hawkesbury Strait Pirates to just simply the Strait Pirates.

On April 14, 2017 the team announced that ownership would be transferred to the community for the first time in the teams 53-year history. Adam Rodgers was named as the new team president, former head coach Tim MacMillan was named as general manager, and Brad Raike and Brian Tracey were named as assistant general managers.

== NHL alumni ==
- Aaron Johnson
- Mike McPhee

== Award winners ==
=== Individual awards ===
Individual Player Awards
Award	Season	Player
Most Valuable Player	1992-93; 1993-94; 1994-95; 2000-01; 2002-03; 2005-06	Whitney Williams; Mark Deveaux; Mark Deveaux; Nick Muise; Darryl MacPherson; Jarrett Marsh
Best Defenceman	1992-93; 2001-02; 2004-05	Todd (Teddy) Andrea; Josh Morash; Michael Brent
Rookie of the Year	1992-93; 1993-94; 1997-98; 2000-01; 2001-02; 2004-05; 2006-07	Jason Broussard; Mark Deveaux; Scott Thompson; Todd Marchand; Jonathan Marsh; Michael Brent; Mark Levangie
Most Sportsmanlike Player	1993-94; 1994-95	Mark Deveaux; Mark Deveaux
Playoff MVP	1993-94; 1998-99; 2000-01; 2001-02; 2002-03	Slade Stephenson; Jason Boudreau; Nick Muise; Darryl MacPherson; Todd Marchand
Coach of the Year	1993-94; 2001-02; 2010-11	Perry Chandler; Robert Ryan; Tim MacMillan
Executive of the Year	2010-11	Strait Pirates

== Yearly results ==
Strait Pirates Results
Season	League	GP	W	L	T	OTL	GF	GA	P	Results	Playoffs
1992-93	NSJBHL	24	11	11	1	1	134	124	24	2nd NSJBHL	
1993-94	NSJBHL	26	17	9	0	0	173	129	38	2nd NSJBHL	Won Finals (Windsor Royals)
1994-95	NSJBHL	32	24	6	2	0	194	137	50	1st North Division	
1995-96	NSJBHL	34	10	19	3	2	142	175	25	3rd North Division	
1996-97	NSJBHL	31	6	21	4	0	112	179	16	4th East Division	
1997-98	NSJBHL	31	10	20	1	0	113	168	21	4th East Division	
1998-99	NSJBHL	32	15	17	0	0	136	163	30	3rd East Division	
1999-00	NSJBHL	32	18	12	2	0	160	126	38	2nd East Division	
2000-01	NSJBHL	34	26	5	3	0	213	113	55	1st East Division	
2001-02	NSJBHL	34	28	5	0	1	239	127	57	1st East Division	
2002-03	NSJBHL	32	13	18	0	1	135	154	27	3rd East Division	
2003-04	NSJBHL	32	7	21	2	2	111	172	18	4th East Division	
2004-05	NSJBHL	32	13	11	4	4	143	142	34	2nd East Division	
2005-06	NSJBHL	34	26	5	0	3	205	100	55	1st East Division	
2006-07	NSJHL	34	16	15	0	3	143	140	35	3rd Sid Rowe; Division	
2007-08	NSJHL	33	20	13	0	0	148	129	40	3rd Sid Rowe; Division	Lost Div Semi-Final 4-1 (Bulldogs)
2008-09	NSJHL	34	15	14	0	5	151	147	35	3rd Sid Rowe; Division	Lost Div Semi-Final 4-0
2009-10	NSJHL	34	18	14	0	2	162	122	38	3rd Sid Rowe; Division	Won Div Semi-Final 4-1; Lost Div Final 4-0
2010-11	NSJHL	34	22	9	0	3	150	96	49	1st in Sid Rowe; Division	Won Div Semi-Final 4-2 (Miners); Won Div Final 4-3 (Blues); Lost Finals 4-0 (Ducks)
2011-12	NSJHL	34	23	11	0	0	160	122	46	1st Sid Rowe; Division	Won Div Semi-Final 4-3 (Miners); Lost Div Final 4-3 (Bulldogs)
2012-13	NSJHL	34	19	13	0	2	121	108	40	3rd Sid Rowe Division	Won Div Semi-Final 4-3 (Scotians); Won Div Final 4-1 (Jr. Miners); Lost Final 4-2 (Blazers)
2013-14	NSJHL	34	15	16	0	3	118	131	33	3rd Sid Rowe Division	Won Div Semi-Final 4-3 (Scotians); Lost Div Final 4-0 (Jr. Miners)
2014-15	NSJHL	34	16	16	0	2	148	135	34	3rd Sid Rowe Division	Lost Div Semi-Final 4-1 (Scotians)
2015-16	NSJHL	34	13	15	1	-	-	-	49	3rd Sid Rowe Division	Lost Div Semifinal 2-4 (Scotians)
2016-17	NSJHL	34	7	19	0	-	109	166	36	4th Sid Rowe Division	Lost Div Semifinal 0-4 (Jr. Miners)
2017-18	NSJHL	34	14	16	0	4	145	143	32	4th of 5 Sid Rowe; 9 of 11 NSJHL	Lost Div Semifinal 0-4 (Jr. Miners)
2018-19	NSJHL	32	29	2	0	1	183	143	68	1st of 6 Sid Rowe; 1st of 12 NSJHL	Won Div Semifinal 4-3 (Bulldogs); Won Div Final 4-0 (Jr. Miners); Lost League Final 2-4 (Blazers)
2019-20	NSJHL	32	17	9	2	2	146	107	40	4th 12 NSJHL	Lost Div Semifinal 2-4 (Jr. Miners)
2020-21	NSJHL	5	3	2	0	0	27	29	6	Season lost due to COVID-19 pandemic	
2021-22	NSJHL	18	8	9	0	1	63	74	17	4 of 6 Sid Rowe; 8th of 12 NSJHL	Won Div Quarterfinal 3-0 (Eagles); Lost Div Semifinal 2-4 (Bulldogs)
2022-23	NSJHL	30	14	14	1	1	123	132	30	4 of 6 Sid Rowe; 8th of 12 NSJHL	Lost Div Quarterfinal 0-4 (Bulldogs)
2023-24	NSJHL	32	17	14	1	0	100	106	35	3 of 6 Sid Rowe; 7th of 12 NSJHL	Lost Div Semifinal 0-4 (Jr. Miners)
2024-25	NSJHL	30	11	16	3	0	77	100	25	4 of 5 Sid Rowe; 8th of 10 NSJHL	Lost Div Semifinal 1-4 (Bulldogs)
