= Nova Scotia Junior Hockey League =

Canadian ice hockey league

Nova Scotia Junior Hockey League

Membership
Hockey Nova Scotia
Founded
Circa 1978
Don Johnson Cups
11
Current Champion
Antigonish Bulldogs (7th)
Current President
Gerard MacDonald
Website
https://www.nsrjhl.ca/

The Nova Scotia Junior Hockey League (formerly the Nova Scotia Junior B Hockey League) is a Junior "B" ice hockey league in Nova Scotia, Canada, sanctioned by Hockey Canada. The winner of the Nova Scotia playoffs competes for the Don Johnson Cup, the Atlantic Junior "B" Crown.

== History ==
The Mainland Junior B Hockey League was formed in 1980 by Al Hollingsworth. In 1992, it took on the Cape Breton Jr. Mills and the Port Hawkesbury Pirates of the folded Cape Breton Junior B Hockey League (also known as the Eastern or Northumberland League) and was renamed the Nova Scotia Junior B Hockey League. In 2006, the league dropped the "B" from its name.

== Teams ==

Fred Fox Division
Team	Centre
Brookfield Elks	Brookfield
Capstone Colts	Cole Harbour
East Hants Penguins	Lantz
South Shore Lumberjacks	Bridgewater
Sackville Blazers	Sackville
Windsor Oxen	Windsor
Sid Rowe Division
Team	Centre
Antigonish Bulldogs	Antigonish
Eskasoni Junior Eagles	Eskasoni First Nation
Membertou Jr. Miners	Membertou
Pictou County Scotians	Trenton
Strait Pirates	Port Hawkesbury

Defunct

- Liverpool Privateers (2015-2023) - Moved to Bridgewater
- Bay Ducks (2005–14) - moved to Liverpool
- Bedford Barons (1980–82)
- Bedford Barons (1994–95)
- Bridgewater Hawks (1980–81)
- Chester Ravens (1993-2002)
- Colchester County K&K Truck Centre Titans (1995–96) - moved to Brookfield
- Colchester County Sports Eagle Experts (1996–97) - renamed Brookfield Elks
- Cumberland County Blues (2000-2024)
- East Hants Penguins (1984–90)
- Eastern Shore Jr. Mariners (2011–14) - moved to Cole Harbour
- Halifax Molson Canadian Blues (1995–96)
- Mount Denson Rangers (1993–97)
- Oxford Blues (2000–03)
- Shannon Huskies (1980–84)
- South Shore Flyers (1980–82)
- Springhill Premium Moosehead Dry (1992–93)
- Springhill Ropak Rangers (1991–92)
- Spryfield Lions (1980–84)
- St. Margaret's Mariners (1988–92)
- Truro Bearcats (1983–91)
- Valley Jets (1980–84)
- Valley Mapel Leafs (2012–25)
- West Colchester Titans (1982–83)
- Windsor Royals (1984-2012)

== Playoff Champions ==
Bolded are teams who also won the Don Johnson Cup as Atlantic Jr. B Champions.

- 1980 Hantsport
- 1981 Valley Jets
- 1982 Antigonish Bulldogs
- 1983 **Antigonish Bulldogs**
- 1984 **Antigonish Bulldogs**
- 1985 East Hants Penguins
- 1986 Sackville Blazers
- 1987 Valley Jets
- 1988 Windsor Royals
- 1989 Sackville Blazers
- 1990 **St. Margaret's Bay Mariners**
- 1991 St. Margaret's Bay Mariners
- 1992 St. Margaret's Bay Mariners
- 1993 Windsor Royals
- 1994 Port Hawkesbury Strait Pirates
- 1995 Windsor Royals
- 1996 Windsor Royals
- 1997 **Cape Breton Alpines**
- 1998 **Windsor Royals**
- 1999 Port Hawkesbury Strain Pirates
- 2000 Cape Breton Alpines
- 2001 Port Hawkesbury Strait Pirates
- 2002 Port Hawkesbury Strait Pirates
- 2003 **Sackville Blazers**
- 2004 **Sackville Blazers**
- 2005 **Sackville Blazers**
- 2006 Antigonish Bulldogs
- 2007 **East Hants Penguins**
- 2008 **Windsor Royals**
- 2009 Cumberland County Blues
- 2010 **Cumberland County Blues**
- 2011 Bay Ducks
- 2012 East Hants Penguins
- 2013 Sackville Blazers
- 2014 Sackville Blazers
- 2015 Glace Bay Jr. Miners
- **2016 Valley Maple Leafs**
- 2017 Pictou County Scotians
- **2018 Kameron Jr. Miners**
- 2019 Sackville Blazers
- 2020 playoffs interrupted
- 2021 playoffs interrupted
- 2022 Antigonish Bulldogs
- **2023 Antigonish Bulldogs**
- **2024 Antigonish Bulldogs'**
- 2025 Capstone Colts - **Antigonish Bulldogs**

== See also ==
- List of ice hockey teams in Nova Scotia
