= New Brunswick Junior Hockey League (2012) =

Canadian junior hockey league

- President: Sheldon Hay
- Vice President: Don Partington
- Founded: 2009
- No. of teams: 12
- Recent champions: B: Moncton Vitos; C: Tri-County River Cats (2019)
- Website: nbjhl.ca

The New Brunswick Junior Hockey League (NBJBHL) is a Canadian Junior ice hockey league in the Province of New Brunswick. The NBJHL is a member of Hockey New Brunswick and Hockey Canada.

== History ==
The original New Brunswick Junior Hockey League folded in 2003. That league was formed in the 1980s from the five regional Jr. B leagues of New Brunswick when the New Brunswick Junior Hockey League folded in 1983.

In the summer of 2009, five teams (Blacks Harbour Silver Kings, Grand Lake Wild Moose, Moncton Vito's, Port City Ice Dawgs, Tri-County River Cats) formed a new Junior B league, the NBJBHL.

Tri-County River Cats won the first three (2010–12) league titles.

With the collapse of the New Brunswick Junior C Hockey League in 2011 Hampton Hurricanes joined the league which was reorganized as a mixed Junior B and Junior C circuit. It was renamed the New Brunswick Junior Hockey League (NBJHL) for the 2012–13 season. Junior C league winners compete at the Maritime-Hockey North Junior C Championship.

Expansion came for the 2013–14 with the addition of the Fundy Cobras and Kent Coyotes. A year late the league accepted another pair of new teams, the Sackville Storm and the Sunny Corner Thunder.

The 2015–16 season saw the league split into the Don Johnson division - with some interlocking games against the Island Junior Hockey League - and the Maritime-Hockey North division.

=== 2012 Vito's ===
In the Spring of 2012, the Moncton Vito's dropped the fifth game of the NBJBHL finals to Tri-County to give the River Cats their third straight provincial title. Just like in 2010, the River Cats declined the right to play for the Don Johnson Cup, the Atlantic Junior B Championship. The Vito's went in their place and after a 1-3-0 record in the round robin, advanced to the playoff rounds. In the semi-final, the Vito's defeated the 4-0-0 host St. John's Jr. Caps 5-4 in overtime. In the final, the Vito's defeated the 4-1-0 East Hants Penguins of the Nova Scotia Junior Hockey League 2-1 in overtime to become the first New Brunswick team to win the Atlantic Junior B championship in a decade and the first-ever from the new NBJBHL.

== Teams ==
Don Johnson - Jr B	Centre	1st Year
Acadia Peninsula Poseidon	Caraquet	2023
A&S Scrap Metal Metros	Sherwood	2015
Kensington Vipers	Kensington	1998
Kent Koyotes	Cocagne	2013
Restigouche West Forestiers	Saint-Quentin	2025
Moncton Vito's	Moncton	2009
Cap Pelé Knights	Cap Pelé	2022
Maritime-Jr C	Centre	1st Year
Elsipogtog Hawks	Elsipogtog	2023
Southern Sting	Quispamsis	2015
Sunny Corner Thunder	Sunny Corner	2014
Tri-County River Cats	Fredericton Junction	2009
Western Valley Panthers	Hartland	2012

=== Former teams ===
- Black Harbour Silver Kings (2009–10)
- Fredericton Jr. Caps (2012–17)
- Fundy Cobras (2013–15)
- Grand Lake Moose (2005–18)
- Hampton Hurricanes (2011–15) - relocated and renamed Southern Sting
- Miramichi River Maniacs (2010–11; 2012–13)
- Cap-Pele Predators (2015–2020)
- Port City Ice Dawgs (2009–15)
- Richibucto Rangers (2021–23) - re-branded to Elsipogtop Hawks
- Sackville Storm (2014–15)
- Saint John Lancers (2011–12)
- Shediac Predators (2012–15) - relocated and renamed Cap-Pele Predators
- St. Andrews Whalers (2010–11)
- Rogersville Castors (2012–13)

== Champions ==
Year	Champion	Runner-up	Result
2010	Tri-County River Cats		
2011	Tri-County River Cats	Moncton Vito's	
2012	B: Tri-County River Cats C: Hampton Hurricanes	Moncton Vito's	4–1
2013	B: Moncton Vito's C: Hampton Hurricanes	Fredericton Caps Western Valley Panthers	4–1 4–3
2014	B: Fredericton Caps C: Hampton Hurricanes	Moncton Vito's Western Valley Panthers	4–2 4–1
2015	B: Moncton Vito's C: Western Valley Panthers	Shediac Predators Grand Lake Moose	4–3 4–3
2016	B: Moncton Vito's C: Western Valley Panthers	Cap-Pele Predators Southern Sting	4–1 4–2
2017	B: Cap-Pele Predators C: Southern Sting	Kent Koyotes Western Valley Panthers	4–0 4–2
2018	B: Moncton Vito's C: Tri-County River Cats	Kent Koyotes Southern Sting	4–1 4–2
2019	B: Moncton Vito's C: Tri-County River Cats	Kent Koyotes Western Valley Panthers	4–0 4–0
2020	B: none C: none		
2021	B: none C: none		
2022	B: Kent Koyotes C: Western Valley Panthers	Moncton Vito's Tri-County River Cats	4–2 3–0
2023	B: Kent Koyotes C: Tri-County River Cats	Moncton Vito's Western Valley Panthers	4–2 4-2
2024	B: Kent Koyotes C: Tri-County River Cats	Moncton Vito's Western Valley Panthers	4–1 4-1
2025	B: Cap-Pele Knights C: Tri-County River Cats	Acadia Peninsula Poseidon Sunny Corner Thunder	4–1 4-1
2026	B: Cap-Pele Knights C: Sunny Corner Thunder	Acadia Peninsula Poseidon Sunny Corner Thunder	4–1 4-1

== Don Johnson Cup Atlantic Champions ==
- 2012 Moncton Vito's
- 2015 Moncton Vito's
- 2017 Cap-Pele Predators
- 2022 Kent Koyotes

== Maritime-Hockey North Junior C Champions ==
- 2013 Hampton Hurricanes
- 2016 Western Valley Panthers
- 2017 Southern Sting
- 2019 Tri-County River Cats
- 2022 Western Valley Panthers
- 2024 Tri-County River Cats
