= St. John's Junior Hockey League =

Junior ice hockey league

- Countries: Canada
- Region(s): Newfoundland and Labrador
- President: Jim Hare
- Founded: 1980; 45 years ago
- No. of teams: 8
- Recent champions: St. John's Jr. Caps (2024)
- Website: Official website

The St. John's Junior Hockey League is a Junior B ice hockey league in Newfoundland and Labrador, sanctioned by Hockey Canada. It was founded in 1980. In 2022, the name of the league championship was changed from the President's Cup to the Taylor Cup in honour of the late founder, Gerry Taylor.

== History ==
Founded in 1980, the SJJHL competed as a Junior A league from 1989 until 1991. In that time period, they were eligible for the Centennial Cup Canadian National championship of Junior A hockey. Every other year the SJJHL has operated at the Junior B level and its champion represents the league in the Veitch Memorial Cup playdowns against the winner of the Central/West Junior Hockey League for the right to play at the Don Johnson Cup.

In the 1970s, there was another league known as the St. John's Junior Hockey League. Much like the Corner Brook League, Southern Shore League, amongst other leagues, the old SJJHL was a junior-aged town league. Although the St. John's Jr. Capitals were a top team in this town league, they would represent St. John's for the Veitch Memorial Trophy as an all-star team of players from the old SJJHL. On one such occasion, in 1972, the Jr. Capitals entered into the first-year Newfoundland Jr. A playdowns, only to win and compete in the 1972 Centennial Cup National Playdowns.

The St. John's Junior Hockey league did not have a team attend the Don Johnson Memorial Tournament, emblematic of the Maritime Jr. B hockey champion.

== Teams ==
The SJJHL is made up of 8 teams:

Team	Home
Avalon Jr. Celtics	St. John’s
CBN Jr. Stars	Bay Roberts
CBR Jr. Renegades	Conception Bay South
Mount Pearl Jr. Blades	Mount Pearl
Northeast Jr. Eagles	Torbay
Paradise Jr. Warriors	Paradise
St. John's Jr. Caps	St. John's
Southern Shore Jr. Breakers	Witless Bay

== Defunct teams ==
- Brother Rice Celtics 1980-1982
- St. John's Guards 1980-1982
- St. John’s PWC 1980-1981
- St. John’s Jr. Shamrocks 1980-1987
- St. John’s Gonzaga 1981-1982
- St. John's Jr. 50's 1982-1993
- Conception Bay South Raiders 1982-1995
- Clarenville Jr. Caribous 1983-1989
- St John's Jr. Celtics 1984-2014
- St John’s Jr. Canadiens 1985
- St John’s AAA Midgets 1988-2000
- Bay Arena Rovers 1988-1989
- Bell Island Jr. Blues 1996-2010
- Conception Bay South Coachman 1998-2001
- Northeast Jr. Eagles 1998-2002
- Avalon Pacers 1999-2000
- St John’s AAA Maple Leafs 2000-2007
- Goulds Pacers 2001
- Mount Pearl Jr. Wild 2013-2014
- Northeast Celtics 2014-2016
- Trinity-Placentia Flyers 2011-2021

== Champions ==
- 1981 St. John's Jr. Shamrocks
- 1982 St. John's Br. Rice Celtics
- 1983 St. John's Jr. Shamrocks
- 1984 St. John's Jr. Shamrocks
- 1985 St. John's Jr. 50's
- 1986 Mount Pearl Jr. Blades
- 1987 St. John's Jr. 50's
- 1988 St. John's Jr. 50's
- 1989 Avalon Jr. Capitals
- 1990 **Avalon Jr. Capitals**
- 1991 **St. John's Jr. 50's**
- 1992 St. John's Jr. 50's
- 1993 St. John's Jr. 50's
- 1994 St. John's Jr. Celtics
- 1995 St. John's Jr. Celtics
- 1996 Avalon Jr. Capitals
- 1997 Bell Island Jr. Blues
- 1998 Bell Island Jr. Blues
- 1999 St. John's Jr. Caps
- 2000 St. John's Jr. Celtics
- 2001 St. John's Jr. Celtics
- 2002 St. John's Jr. Caps
- 2003 Mount Pearl Jr. Blades
- 2004 Conception Bay North Jr. Stars
- 2005 Trinity-Placentia Jr. Flyers
- 2006 Conception Bay North Jr. Stars
- 2007 Mount Pearl Jr. Blades
- 2008 St. John's Jr. Celtics
- 2009 Mount Pearl Jr. Blades
- 2010 St. John's Jr. Caps
- 2011 St. John's Jr. Celtics
- 2012 St. John's Jr. Caps
- 2013 St. John's Jr. Caps
- 2014 Avalon Jr. Capitals
- 2015 St. John's Jr. Caps
- 2016 Conception Bay North Jr. Stars
- 2017 Southern Shore Jr. Breakers
- 2018 Mount Pearl Jr. Blades
- 2019 CBR Jr. Renegades
- 2020 No Playoffs - covid
- 2021 No Playoffs - covid
- 2022 Mount Pearl Jr. Blades
- 2023 CBN Stars
- 2024 St. John's Jr. Caps
- 2025 CBN Stars

Italics represent Veitch Memorial Trophy Champions Bold represents Provincial Junior A Champions

In 2022, the League renamed the SJJHL Championship from the President's Cup to the Taylor Cup in honour of the late Gerry Taylor, the founding father of the SJJHL who was affectionately known as Mr. Junior Hockey in Newfoundland and Labrador.

Due to the Covid-19 pandemic, the SJJHL did not award the championship in the 2019-20 and 2020-21 seasons.

=== Non-league provincial champions ===
These teams won the Veitch Memorial Trophy without winning the SJJHL playoffs.

- 1984 St. John's Jr. 50's
- 1996 Avalon Jr. Capitals
- 2000 Conception Bay North Jr. Stars
- 2003 St. John's Jr. Celtics
- 2007 Bell Island Jr. Blues
- 2009 St. John's Jr. Caps

=== Atlantic Jr. B Champions ===
These teams won the Don Johnson Cup as Atlantic Junior B Champions.

- 1982 St. John's Br. Rice Celtics
- 1985 St. John's Jr. 50's
- 1986 Mount Pearl Jr. Blades
- 1987 St. John's Jr. 50's
- 1988 St. John's Jr. 50's
- 2009 St. John's Jr. Caps

== Executive ==
The league is governed by an elected executive with ten members, nine of whom are voting members.

Position	Name
President	Jim Hare
Vice President	Boyd Hillier
Registrar	Steven Clarke
Treasurer	Colin Gosse
Director of Statistics, Rules, and Minor Officials	Vacant
Director of Communications & Public Relations	Vacant
Director-at-Large	Amanda Tibbo
Director-at-Large	Paul Shephard
Recording Secretary	Keith Cronin
Past President	Mark Noseworthy

== See also ==
- List of ice hockey teams in Newfoundland and Labrador
