= Valley Wildcats =

Bage Valley Wildcats
- City: Berwick, Nova Scotia
- League: Maritime Junior Hockey League
- Division: Eastlink South
- Founded: 1967 (Antigonish Bulldogs)
- Home arena: Kings Mutual Century Centre (The Apple Dome)
- Colours: Red, white, dark blue
- General manager: Corey Mullett
- Head coach: Jesse MacLean
- Media: FloHockey

Franchise history
- 1967-2008: Antigonish Bulldogs
- 2008-2010: Halifax Lions
- 2010-2012: Metro Marauders
- 2012-2013: Metro Shipbuilders
- 2013-present: Valley Wildcats

The Valley Wildcats are a Canadian junior ice hockey franchise from the Annapolis Valley region of Nova Scotia. The team is a member of the Maritime Junior Hockey League and plays in the EastLink Division. They play their home games in the Kings Mutual Century Centre in Berwick, Nova Scotia.

== History ==
The Antigonish Bulldogs were founded in 1967 as members of the Antigonish-Pictou-Colchester Junior B Hockey League. After two seasons the league became the Northumberland Junior B Hockey League. In 1974, the Bulldogs became a founding member of what became the Eastern Junior A Hockey League, but returned to the Northumberland League in 1975. The Bulldogs would win league titles and provincial titles in 1979, 1981, 1982, 1983, 1984, and 1985. They would also win the Don Johnson Cup as Atlantic Junior B Champions in 1983 and 1984, the first team to ever win the Cup back-to-back. In 1987 they jumped to the Metro Valley Junior A League, which became the MJAHL in 1991.

The franchise was known as the Antigonish Bulldogs for 40 years. After it was decided that operating in Antigonish, Nova Scotia was no longer viable, the franchise was sold to a Metro Halifax group and then relocated to that city in the summer of 2008. The team's nickname, then, as the Halifax Lions was announced on August 22, 2008. The name is a tribute to the successful Halifax Lions teams of the 1980s.

In 2010, the team was relocated to Dartmouth, Nova Scotia and renamed again as the Metro Marauders. Two years later, it was renamed the Metro Shipbuilders.

In 2013, it was announced that the Halifax Regional Municipality was losing Junior A hockey, due to low attendance rates in the area. The Metro franchise's move to the valley area of Nova Scotia was confirmed by the league's board of governors ahead of the 2013 MHL draft on June 15. The franchise was renamed the Valley Wildcats and was based in Kentville, Nova Scotia.

On April 5, 2014, it was announced that the franchise would be relocating once again, this time from Kentville to Berwick, Nova Scotia but will remain as the Valley Wildcats.

== Season-by-season record ==
Season	GP	W	L	T	OTL	GF	GA	P	Results	Playoffs
1967-68	18	7	10	1	-	--	--	15	2nd APCJBHL	Lost final
1968-69	Statistics Not Available									
1969-70	24	13	9	2	-	103	92	28	3rd NJBHL	Lost semi-final
1970-71	30	14	13	3	-	--	--	31	3rd NJBHL	Lost semi-final
1971-82	Statistics Not Available									
1982-83	24	16	7	1	-	--	--	33	1st NJBHL	Won League, won DJC
1983-85	Statistics Not Available									
1985-86	30	19	9	2	-	147	119	40	2nd NJBHL	
1986-87	40	11	21	8	-	171	222	30	4th MVJHL	
1987-88	40	21	16	3	-	202	171	45	3rd MVJHL	
1988-89	40	20	13	7	-	209	186	47	3rd MVJHL	
1989-90	38	24	12	2	-	230	181	50	3rd MVJHL	
1990-91	40	21	12	7	-	210	172	49	3rd MVJHL	
1991-92	46	25	14	7	-	256	195	57	2nd MJAHL	
1992-93	48	23	16	7	2	235	179	55	3rd MJAHL	Won League
1993-94	48	32	13	2	1	273	177	67	2nd MJAHL	Won League
1994-95	48	27	14	7	0	215	202	61	2nd MJAHL	
1995-96	54	32	19	2	1	288	231	67	2nd MJAHL	
1996-97	56	30	21	3	2	287	264	65	4th MJAHL	
1997-98	51	19	25	3	4	229	244	45	7th MJAHL	
1998-99	48	29	16	3	-	241	149	64	3rd MJAHL	
1999-00	52	34	12	5	1	273	181	74	3rd MJAHL	
2000-01	52	33	16	2	1	260	187	69	2nd MJAHL	Won League
2001-02	52	4	41	4	3	123	296	15	10th MJAHL	
2002-03	52	24	27	1	0	210	226	49	7th MJAHL	
2003-04	52	20	25	3	4	166	206	47	7th MJAHL	
2004-05	56	23	25	5	3	200	216	54	8th MJAHL	
2005-06	56	30	22	0	4	196	182	65	5th MJAHL	Lost in division semi-final
2006-07	58	28	21	0	9	218	229	65	7th MJAHL	Lost in division quarter-final
2007-08	58	6	48	-	4	105	299	16	12th MJAHL	
2008-09	54	10	39	-	5	159	288	25	10th MJAHL	
2009-10	50	22	24	-	4	178	199	48	6th MJAHL	Lost quarter-final
2010-11	52	27	21	-	4	173	177	58	7th MHL	Lost Mini Series
2011-12	52	27	19	-	6	202	192	60	6th MHL	Lost quarter-final
2012-13	52	4	46	-	2	124	287	10	11th MHL	DNQ
2013-14	52	19	28	-	5	141	204	43	9th MHL	Lost quarter-final
2014-15	48	25	16	-	7	187	164	57	6th MHL	Lost semi-final
2015-16	48	26	17	2	3	179	165	57	2nd of 6 South; 5th of 12 MHL	Lost semi-finals 2-4 (Crushers)
2016-17	50	12	31	4	3	140	245	31	6th of 6 South; 12th of 12 MHL	DNQ
2017-18	50	17	31	1	1	140	196	36	6th of 6 South; 10th of 12 MHL	DNQ
2018-19	50	6	40	0	4	93	240	16	6th of 6 South; 12th of 12 MHL	DNQ
2019-20	52	11	37	4	0	130	227	26	6th of 6 South; 12th of 12 MHL	DNQ
2020-21	32	9	21	2	0	87	132	20	6th of 6 South; 12th of 12 MHL	playoffs impacted by covid 19 restrictions
2021-22	38	19	16	2	1	109	119	41	3rd of 6 South; 7th of 12 MHL	Won Div Semifinals 4-2 (Mariners); Lost Div Finals 3-4 (Bearcats)
2022-23	52	22	26	1	3	181	209	48	3rd of 6 South; 7th of 12 MHL	Lost Div Semifinals 2-4 (Bearcats)
2023-24	52	10	40	2	0	179	319	22	6th of 6 South; 12th of 12 MHL	DNQ
2024-25	52	9	41	1	1	145	283	20	6th of 6 South; 12th of 12 MHL	DNQ
2025-26	52	12	38	0	2	161	266	26	6th of 6 South; 12th of 12 MHL	DNQ

== See also ==
- List of ice hockey teams in Nova Scotia

Preceded by St. John's Jr. Celtics	Don Johnson Cup Champions; 1983 and 1984	Succeeded by St. John's Jr. 50's
