= Island Junior Hockey League =

- Classification: Junior B
- Sport: Ice hockey
- Founded: 1996
- No. of teams: 2
- Country: Canada
- Most recent champion: Kensington Vipers (13)
- Most titles: Kensington Vipers (13)
- Website: ijhl.ca

The Island Junior Hockey League was a Junior "B" ice hockey league in Prince Edward Island, Canada, sanctioned by Hockey Canada.

== History ==
The IJHL shares its name with a former league, which competed at the Junior "A" level in the same region from 1973 to 1991.

Since being founded in 1996, the IJHL has been strictly a Junior B League, one tier below the Junior A Maritime Junior Hockey League and two tiers below the Junior ice hockey#Major JuniorQuebec Maritimes Junior Hockey League, which both have teams located in Prince Edward Island.

In 2002, the O'Leary Eagles won the Don Johnson Cup as Maritime Junior B champions. Nine years later, in 2011, the Kensington Vipers repeated the act as Maritime champions, following up their success again in 2013 and 2023 respectively.

Following the 2021-22, the league lost both the Western Red Wings and Eastern Maniacs but added the Kings County Rivermen. With only 3 remaining teams, the league negotiated to play regular season games with the New Brunswick Junior B Hockey League (NBJHL), with PEI holding their own playoff series.

For the 2023-24 season, the Sherwood Metros and Kings County Rivermen merged and, along with Kensington, will once again compete in the NBJHL to determine the PEI representative for the Don Johnson Memorial Cup. For the 2024-25 season the Sherwood Metros announced a one-year sabbatical, leaving only the Kensington Vipers representing PEI at the Junior B level. The 2025 Don Johnson Memorial Cup was initially scheduled to be hosted by the Kensington Vipers. However, the community did not want the championship which was re-located to Cognac New Brunswick. The Vipers did attend as the PEI representative.

== Teams for 2024-25 Season ==
Team	Centre	Joined
Kensington Vipers	Kensington	1998

== Champions ==
Year	Champion	Runner-up	Result
1997	Sherwood Falcons		
1998	Kings County Sharks		
1999	Kings County Sharks		
2000	Summerside Red Wings		
2001	Sherwood Falcons		
2002	O'Leary Eagles	Sherwood Falcons	4–1
2003	Sherwood Falcons	Kensington Vipers	4–3
2004	Kensington Vipers	Sherwood Falcons	4–1
2005	Kensington Vipers	Sherwood Falcons	4–3
2006	Sherwood Falcons	Kensington Vipers	4–2
2007	Kensington Vipers	South Shore Red Wings	4–1
2008	Kensington Vipers	Sherwood Falcons	4–2
2009	Sherwood Falcons	Kensington Vipers	4–2
2010	Kensington Vipers	Sherwood Falcons	4–3
2011	Kensington Vipers	Down East Maniacs	4–0
2012	Kensington Vipers	Western Red Wings	4–0
2013	Kensington Vipers	Western Red Wings	4–0
2014	Kensington Vipers	Montague Maniacs	4–0
2015	Kensington Vipers	Western Red Wings	4–0
2016	Kensington Vipers	Western Red Wings	4–3
2017	Western Red Wings	Kensington Vipers	4–3
2018	Western Red Wings	Sherwood Metros	4–2
2019	Western Red Wings	Kensington Vipers	4–1
2020	Playoffs cancelled due to COVID-19 pandemic		
2021	Western Red Wings	Sherwood Metros	4–1
2022	Sherwood Metros	Western Red Wings	4–0
2023	Kensington Vipers	Sherwood Metros	4–1
2024	Kensington Vipers	Sherwood Metros	4–0
2025	Kensington Vipers	by default	0–0
2026	No League		

== See also ==
- List of ice hockey teams in Prince Edward Island
