= Mount Pearl Samurai =

- City: Mount Pearl, Newfoundland and Labrador
- League: Avalon East Senior Hockey League
- Founded: 2012
- Home arena: Mount Pearl Glacier
- Colours: Red and White
- Head coach: Aiden Mullins

Franchise history
- 2012-2013: Mount Pearl Samurai

The Mount Pearl Samurai were a Canadian senior ice hockey team from Mount Pearl, Newfoundland and Labrador. They were part of the Avalon East Senior Hockey League and are eligible for the Herder Memorial Trophy as well as the Allan Cup.

== History ==
The Mount Pearl Samurai were granted expansion into the Avalon East Senior Hockey League in the fall of 2012. The addition of the Samurai coincided with the hiatus of the Mount Pearl Blades of the Newfoundland Senior Hockey League, who are sitting out 2012-13 if not indefinitely.

On October 26, 2012, the Samurai played their first ever game, dropping a 10-2 decision to the Northeast Eagles on the road. On November 2, 2012, the Samurai played their first ever home game, losing 4–3 to the St. John's Caps. The Samurai's first ever victory came on November 10, 2012, a 6–1 win over the Bell Island Blues at home.

== Season-by-season standings ==
Season	GP	W	L	T	OTL	GF	GA	P	Results	Playoffs
2012-13	19	9	9	-	1	73	85	19	3rd AESHL	Lost semi-final

== 2012 draft results ==
Pick Number	Player
1	Andrew Temple
9	Brent Skiffington
13	Patrick Brown
17	Brent Robinson

== 2012–13 roster ==
Pos.	Player
F	Steve Bailey
D	Brent Betts
D	James Blair
G	Patrick Browne
F	Josh Butt
D	Jon Dawe
D	Joel Fulford
G	Mike Giannou
D	Andrew Goodwin
F	Brad Layman
D	Paul Mitchelmore (A)
F	Ryan Norris
F	Nick Nurse
F	Kenny Pennell (A)
F	Brett Robinson
F	Mike Rose
F	Chris Ryan
F	Matt Ryan
F	Kirk Simms
D	Brent Skiffington
F	Aaron Schwartz
F	Brad Swain
F	Andrew Temple
F	Jason Thorne (C)
F	Trevor Thorne (A)
G	Mark Yetman
F	Andrew Young

== See also ==
- List of ice hockey teams in Newfoundland and Labrador
