= Northeast Eagles =

Northeast Eagles can refer to any of the following ice hockey teams in Canada:

- Northeast Jr. Eagles, a junior team in Newfoundland.
- Northeast Sr. Eagles, a senior team in Newfoundland.
