= Regatta Day =

Regatta Day may refer to:

- Royal Hobart Regatta, an annual three-day regatta in Hobart, Tasmania, Australia
- Royal St. John's Regatta, an annual regatta and public holiday in St. John's, Newfoundland, Canada
