= CJHL =

CJHL may refer to:

== Ice hockey leagues in Canada ==
- Canadian Junior Hockey League, the association of Canadian Junior "A" hockey leagues
- Calgary Junior Hockey League, in Calgary, Alberta
- Capital Junior Hockey League, in Edmonton, Alberta area

== Renamed ==
- Central Canada Hockey League, formerly Central Junior A Hockey League 1964-2010
- Ontario Junior Hockey League, formerly Central Junior B Hockey League 1971–1993

== Defunct ==
- Central Junior C Hockey League, in Eastern Ontario (1970-2016)
- Georgian Mid-Ontario Junior C Hockey League, formerly Central Junior C Hockey League 1973–1976
- Western Junior C Hockey League, formerly Central Junior C Hockey League 1969 until the 1980s

== See also ==
- Central/West Junior Hockey League (CWJHL), in Newfoundland
