= HNL Provincial Championships =

HNL Provincial Championships Coupe de Terre-Neuve (French)
- Formerly: Hockey NL Provincial Championships
- Sport: Ice hockey
- Broadcasters: La Première / France Télévisions (in Saint Pierre and Miquelon, France)
- Sponsors: Hockey NL; PAL Airlines; Steele Hotels
- Website: HNLProvincials.ca

The Hockey NL Provincial Championships is the U11, U13, U15 and U18 ice hockey international championship for Newfoundland and Labrador, including the French archipelago of Saint Pierre and Miquelon, where it is called the Coupe de Terre-Neuve (in English: "Newfoundland Cup").

This is a divisional competition, with a separate winner in each category, rather than a single champion for the whole competition. Gold, silver and bronze medals are awarded according to the final ranking in each category. Although there is no television broadcast in Newfoundland and Labrador, the local television channel Saint Pierre and Miquelon La Première broadcasts and comments on the matches live on its website, particularly for the 2025 edition.

== History ==
The 2025 tournament marks the return of the competition to Saint-Pierre, after an 18-year absence in the French archipelago. The 2025 tournament marks the return of competition to Saint-Pierre after an 18-year absence from the French archipelago. In Saint Pierre and Miquelon, the Coupe de Terre-Neuve, as it is known locally, has been a tradition in the archipelago for many years. It remains an opportunity for Saint-Pierre teams to test themselves against their Canadian neighbours.

== See also ==
- Hockey Newfoundland and Labrador (Hockey NL)
- Saint Pierre and Miquelon Hockey Association (LHSPM)
- French Ice Hockey Federation
