= Central West Junior Hockey League =

Central West Junior Hockey League
Membership	Hockey Newfoundland and Labrador
Founded	2004
Don Johnson Cups	0
Most Championships	Central Jr. Cataracts (4)
Current Champion	Bishop's Falls Jr. Express (2013)

The Central West Junior Hockey League was an ice hockey league in Newfoundland and Labrador, Canada. The league consists three teams that compete against each other in an 18-game season. The playoffs include two rounds, the first round is a best of five series, with the winner of each series compete for the Exploits Home Hardware Cup in a best of seven series.

Until 2013, after the conclusion of the playoffs the winner competes for the Veitch Memorial Trophy against the winner in the St. John's Junior Hockey League. Winners of the Veitch Memorial Trophy earns the right to represent Newfoundland and Labrador in the Don Johnson Cup.

== History ==
Through the years the CWJHL was a league that could churn out a strong contender for the Veitch Memorial Trophy. During the last two seasons experienced a massive drop in talent. At the 2011 Provincials, the Central Jr. Cataracts lost to the St. John's Jr. Celtics of the St. John's Junior Hockey League 5–3 in the round robin and 2–1 in the final. A year later at the 2012 Provincials, the champion Humber Valley Jr. Red Wings lost 16–2 to the SJJHL's St. John's Jr. Caps and 11–1 to the Mount Pearl Jr. Blades. In 2013, the champion Bishop's Falls Jr. Express lost 17–1 to the Jr. Caps in the semi-final and in the final the host Stephenville Jr. Jets lost 15–2.

The drop in competitiveness within the CWJHL combined with a lack of volunteers to run the league led Hockey Newfoundland and Labrador to demote the league to Junior C after the 2012–13 season. When league members missed the deadline to register for the Maritime-Hockey North Junior C Championships, organization for the season faltered and never materialized.

== Past teams ==
- Bay St. George Junior Jets
- Bishop's Falls Jr. Express
- Central Jr. Arctic Blast
- Central Jr. Cataracts
- Corner Brook Junior Royals
- Deer Lake Junior Red Wings
- Humber Valley Junior Red Wings
- Port Aux Basque Centennials
- Port-Aux-Basques Jr. Mariners
- Stephenville Jr. Jets
- Triton Roadrunners

== Champions ==
CWJHL champions
Year	Champion	Runner-up	Result
2005	Central Jr. Arctic Blast		
2006	Central Jr. Arctic Blast		
2007	Central Jr. Cataracts		
2008	Triton Roadrunners		
2009	Central Jr. Cataracts		
2010	Central Jr. Cataracts		
2011	Central Jr. Cataracts		
2012	Humber Valley Jr. Red Wings		
2013	Bishop's Falls Jr. Express	Port-Aux-Basques Jr. Mariners	4-2

== See also ==
- List of ice hockey teams in Newfoundland and Labrador
