= Don Johnson (sports executive) =

Canadian sports executive (1930–2012)

- Born: March 25, 1930; Halifax, Nova Scotia, Canada
- Died: May 12, 2012 (aged 82); St. John's, Newfoundland and Labrador, Canada
- Education: St. Mary's College
- Occupations: Bank manager, accountant, civil servant, journalist
- Known for: Canadian Amateur Hockey Association and Newfoundland Amateur Hockey Association president
- Awards: Newfoundland and Labrador Sports Hall of Fame (1982)
- Honours: Don Johnson Memorial Cup

Donald Stewart Johnson (March 25, 1930 – May 12, 2012) was a Canadian sports executive. He was elected president of the Newfoundland Amateur Hockey Association (NAHA) in 1966, sought to expand minor ice hockey in Newfoundland and negotiated for the NAHA to become a member of the Canadian Amateur Hockey Association (CAHA). He was elected president of the CAHA in 1975, resolved internal disagreement over the jurisdiction of junior ice hockey, avoided the withdrawal of the Western Canada Hockey League and sought a new professional-amateur agreement with the National Hockey League and World Hockey Association. He was part of negotiations to end the Canada men's national ice hockey team hiatus from the Ice Hockey World Championships and the Olympic Games, in exchange for International Ice Hockey Federation approval of the 1976 Canada Cup. He established a long-term sponsorship to improve the National Coaching Certification Program, twice visited China with a Canadian amateur team for instructional tours and arranged an exchange for Chinese players and coaches to attend training camps in Canada. He was chairman of the 1978 World Junior Ice Hockey Championships as the CAHA past-president, and was posthumously credited by Hockey Canada for playing an important role in Canada's return to international competitions and improving Canada's hockey reputation.

Johnson was a member of the Royal St. John's Regatta committee for 18 years, which included a term as president and obtaining permission to use the Royal prefix. He served as a director of the Sports Federation of Canada and the National Sport Recreation Centre. He was also chairman of the Interprovincial Sports and Recreation Council, a member of the Canada Games council and sat on the board of governors for Canada's Sports Hall of Fame. He was the assistant deputy Newfoundland Minister of Sport during the late 1970s, was an executive member of the Newfoundland and Labrador Amateur Sports Federation, served as treasurer of Softball Newfoundland and the Newfoundland Amateur Sports Federation, and was president of the St. John's Senior Softball League. His other sporting interests included sitting on the board of directors for the St. John's Maple Leafs, a director of the Youth Bowling Council of Canada, and a delegate to the Canadian Amateur Swimming Association. Johnson was inducted into the Newfoundland and Labrador Sports Hall of Fame, the Newfoundland Hockey Hall of Fame, the Royal St. John's Regatta Hall of Fame, the Newfoundland and Labrador Volunteer Hall of Fame, and was made the namesake of the Don Johnson Memorial Cup.

== Early life and education ==
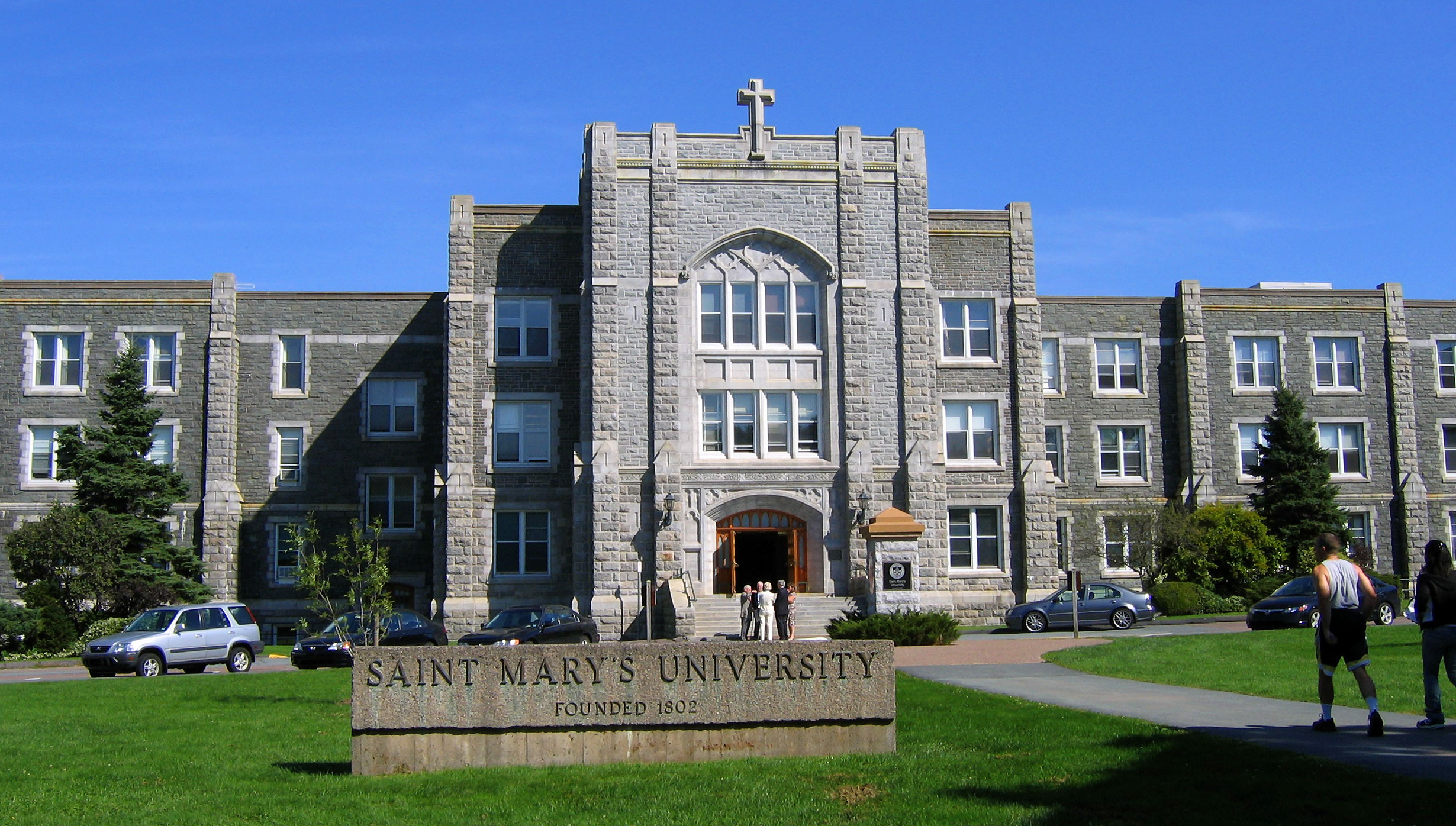
St. Mary's in Halifax

Donald Stewart Johnson was born on March 25, 1930, in Halifax, Nova Scotia, to parents Donald Johnson Sr. and Ina MacRobson. He began playing ice hockey as a youth and became a defenceman. He attended St. Mary's High School where he played junior ice hockey, then completed university studies while playing for the Saint Mary's Huskies. He remained with St. Mary's to coach at both the high school level and the Atlantic Universities Athletics Association level.

Johnson began working for the Bank of Nova Scotia in Middleton, Nova Scotia, in 1949, and later worked at several branches in the Annapolis Valley while playing senior ice hockey. He played for the Middleton Maple Leafs for two seasons, then later played for the Digby Ravens, then transferred to a branch in Halifax and played for the Fairview Aces. In the late 1950s, he became an accountant at the branch in Campbellton, New Brunswick, and won a provincial hockey championship during his second season with the Campbellton Tigers.

== Newfoundland hockey career ==
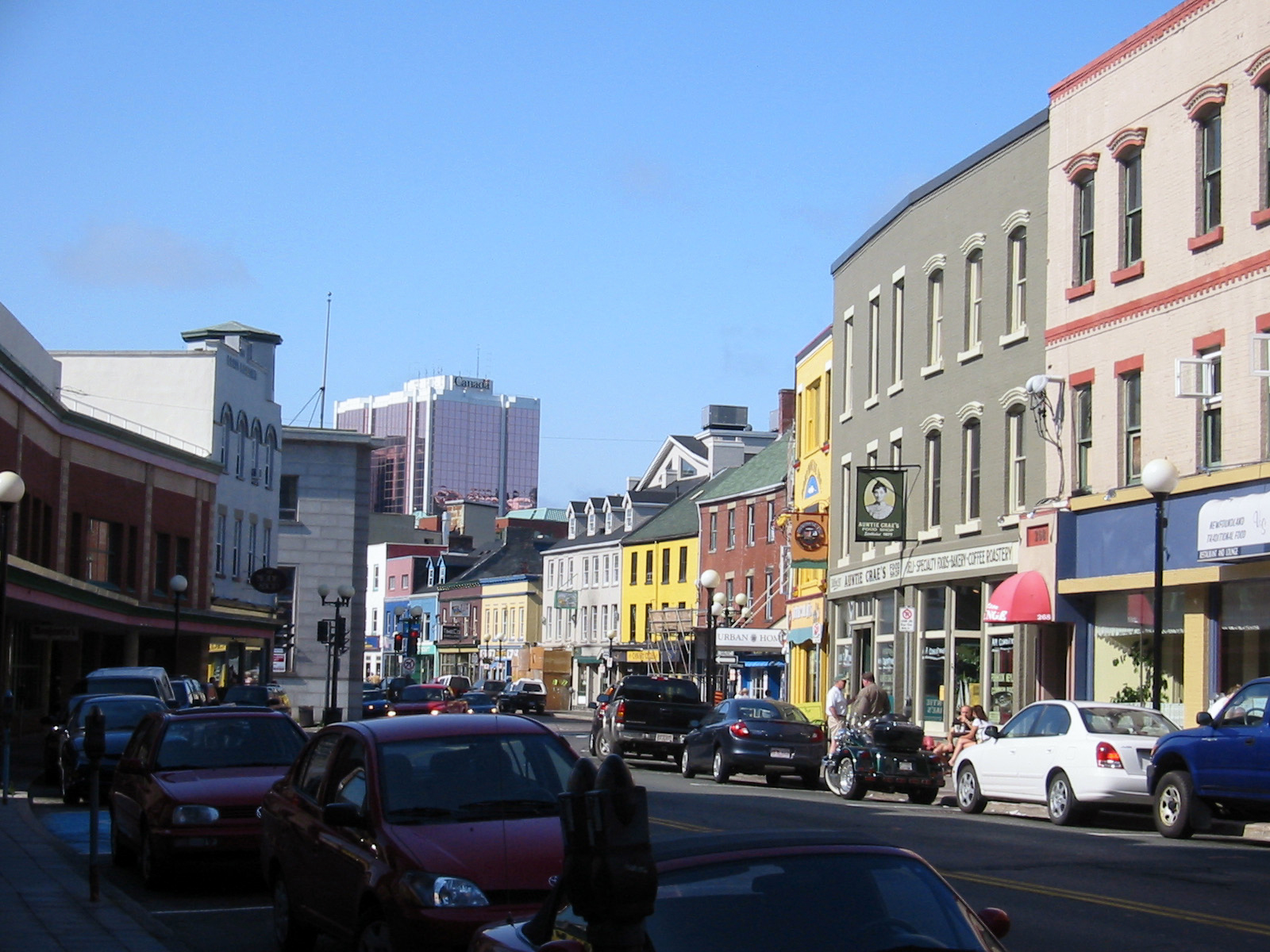
Water Street in St. John's

Johnson relocated to Newfoundland in December 1959, after he was appointed the accountant of the main Bank of Nova Scotia branch in downtown St. John's. He played senior hockey for the St. Patrick's team that won the Boyle Trophy championship in the 1959–60 and 1960–61 seasons. His assist on the winning goal in the decisive game in 1960 ended a 16-year consecutive championship streak by the Saint Bonaventure's College alumni senior team. The St. John's Daily News reported in 1960 that Johnson was a critic of the local sports news, but credited him for being a new citizen to the city who showed interested in the administration and growth of local hockey.

Johnson temporarily retired as a player and was named head coach of the St. Patrick's junior and senior hockey teams for the 1961–62 season. In August 1962, he was promoted to become manager of the Bank of Nova Scotia branch on Water Street in St. John's. He came out of retirement to play the 1962–63 season for the St. John's Royal Canadian Legion senior hockey team.

Johnson permanently retired from playing in 1963, and was named to a new committee set up by St. Patrick's Hall Schools to focus on intramural sports leagues for its alumni. He was elected secretary of the St. John's Junior and Senior Amateur Hockey League in 1963, then became president in 1964 and oversaw expansion into a provincial-wide senior hockey competition, while maintaining the St. John's league. He also coached several senior and minor ice hockey teams in the league.

Johnson was elected president of the Newfoundland Amateur Hockey Association (NAHA) in 1966 and wanted to expand minor ice hockey as one of its permanent programs. He expected that the NAHA could join the Canadian Amateur Hockey Association (CAHA) within five years if the terms of affiliation were acceptable, and that it could be admitted independent of and equal to the Maritime Amateur Hockey Association. He sought for the CAHA to accommodate more NAHA requests than in previous offers of affiliation, which included the NAHA keeping regulations which allowed a paid player-coach and the occasional professional player on a roster. The NAHA also wanted its senior league to have shorter playoffs for the Allan Cup instead of an interlocking schedule with teams from the Maritimes.

In May 1966, Johnson reached an agreement with CAHA president Lionel Fleury who accepted the NAHA as a branch member for the 1966–67 season. Johnson stated that despite Newfoundland becoming Canada's tenth province in 1949, the NAHA took 17 years to affiliate with the CAHA "through lack of information, misinterpretation of correspondence and other factors". Johnson wrote that Newfoundlanders were reluctant to give up their old ways, but the time had come to join the CAHA as an independent branch.

In 1969, when the CAHA debated participation at the Ice Hockey World Championships, Johnson argued in favour of withdrawing when denied permission to use professionals. He felt that pure amateur international competition was a thing of the past, and that it would force European nations to negotiate competing against Canada's best players.

== CAHA vice-president ==
The Allan Cup was the championship trophy for amateur senior ice hockey in Canada.

Johnson and the NAHA hosted the 1970 CAHA general meeting in St. John's, which focused on Canada's possible return to international competition at the Ice Hockey World Championships and in ice hockey at the Olympic Games. The CAHA also discussed having the Allan Cup finals as a tournament format located in one host location, which was supported by Johnson and the NAHA. At the same meeting, he was elected vice-president of the CAHA in charge of senior and intermediate hockey and served in the same position until 1973.

Johnson was elected first vice-president of the CAHA in May 1973. He remained involved in senior hockey in Newfoundland, and was an assistant coach with the St. John's Capitals that won three consecutive Herder Memorial Trophy championships from 1973 to 1975. He travelled to China to represent the CAHA on an exhibition tour by the UBC Thunderbirds men's ice hockey team in December 1973. The trip was supported by the Government of Canada as part of a desire to normalize relations with China, and coach Bob Hindmarch and his players conducted practices attended by the Chinese.

Johnson was re-elected first vice-president in May 1974 by acclamation. He also acted as chairman of the CAHA's development council, and arranged an international junior ice hockey coach seminar in Winnipeg, in conjunction with the 1975 World Junior Ice Hockey Championships. The Winnipeg Free Press reported that Johnson achieved a personal victory at the 1974 CAHA general meeting, after the CAHA removed "sudden death" and replaced it with "sudden victory" in its rules and regulations. He felt the previous overtime rule to be "distasteful" and had tried to get it changed for several years.

In May 1975, the CAHA adopted of series of updates to its ice hockey rules in an effort to reduce on-ice violence and improve the safety of players. Changes specifically targeted fighting, cross-checking, high-sticking, head butting and preventing the abuse of on-ice officials. Johnson felt that the changes were improvements and had been resisted for a long time due to "tradition and history" in the game. One year later, mandatory helmet use for players and on-ice officials was implemented. In addition to safety, Johnson led efforts to obtain funding for development of junior ice hockey and minor ice hockey in Canada.

== CAHA president ==
=== First term ===
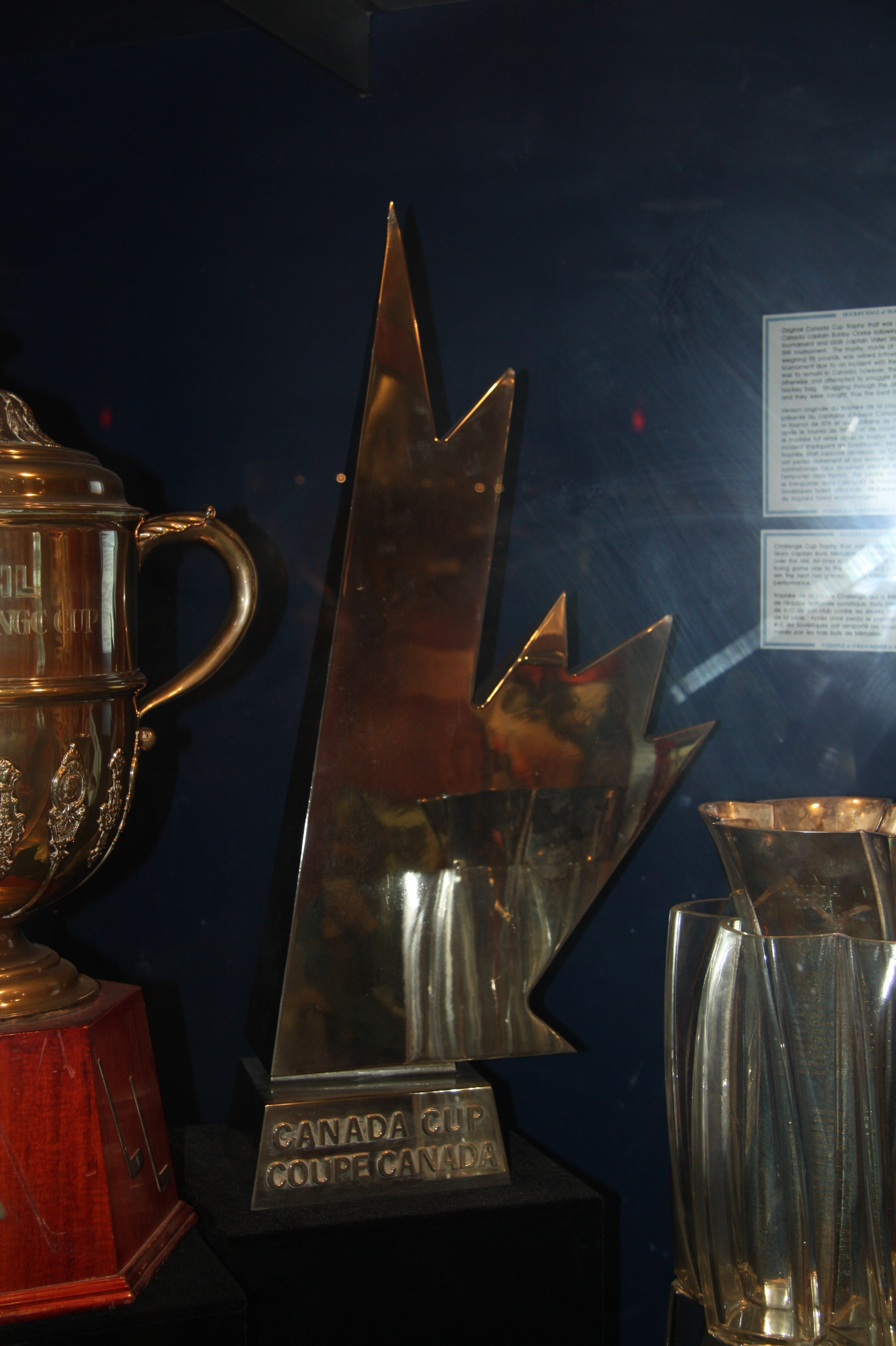
The Canada Cup trophy

Johnson was elected president of the CAHA to succeed Jack Devine in May 1975, and became the only person from Newfoundland to hold the position. He was immediately faced with a large budget shortfall and internal disagreement over the jurisdiction of junior hockey in Western Canada.

The CAHA sought C$195,000 from the World Hockey Association (WHA) in outstanding payments for drafting and signing junior-aged players to professional contracts. The CAHA asked for assistance from Marc Lalonde, the Minister of National Health and Welfare, in getting the National Hockey League (NHL) and the WHA back to the negotiation table for a new professional-amateur agreement after the previous deal expired earlier in 1975. The CAHA approved an operating budget with an $88,450 deficit excluding projected income from draft fees, and relied on its financial reserves to cover operating costs and conducting instructional clinics for coaches. Johnson announced coaching clinics targeted at regional, provincial and national levels, with plans to begin clinics for international level coaching. Financial assistance was provided by the Government of Canada and from a sponsorship negotiated with the O'Keefe Sports Foundation and the Daoust-Lalonde skate company.

The Western Canada Hockey League (WCHL) threatened to withdraw from the CAHA and the newly formed Canadian Major Junior Hockey League due to the Western Canada branches of the CAHA refusing to allow junior-aged players to be recruited across provincial boundaries. The Alberta Amateur Hockey Association was upset with the WCHL which relocated teams into Alberta without consultation, and the British Columbia Amateur Hockey Association had withdrawn from the general meeting in protest of perceived lack of support in getting the WCHL to affiliate its three teams in British Columbia. Alberta later threatened suspension of the WCHL teams due to disagreements on the drafting and placement of players. Johnson stated that the CAHA would take necessary action if any party did not live up to expectations, and felt that negotiations with WCHL president Ed Chynoweth were going smoothly. The Lethbridge Herald reported that after Johnson attended the 1976 WCHL All-star Game banquet and used "personality and polish" to make friends, the previous differences between the WCHL and the CAHA were forgotten.

Johnson was part of the Hockey Canada delegation to the International Ice Hockey Federation (IIHF) congress in July 1975 to discuss the Canada men's national ice hockey team returning to international play. Canada had withdrawn from international play prior to the 1970 Ice Hockey World Championships over disagreements on the use of professional players. Johnson stated that Canada had a "strong desire" to participate in the World Championships, but sought co-operation from North American professional leagues and the Government of Canada.

During the congress, Johnson made a deal that if he voted for Günther Sabetzki to become IIHF president instead of Bunny Ahearne, then Canada would get use of professionals at the World Champsionships. Canada proposed hosting an invitational tournament for the world's top six national teams allowing professionals, which became the Canada Cup. The IIHF approved the tournament and in return Canada agreed to play at the World Championships in 1977. Alan Eagleson felt that Johnson did not get enough credit for Canada returning to international play.

=== Second term ===
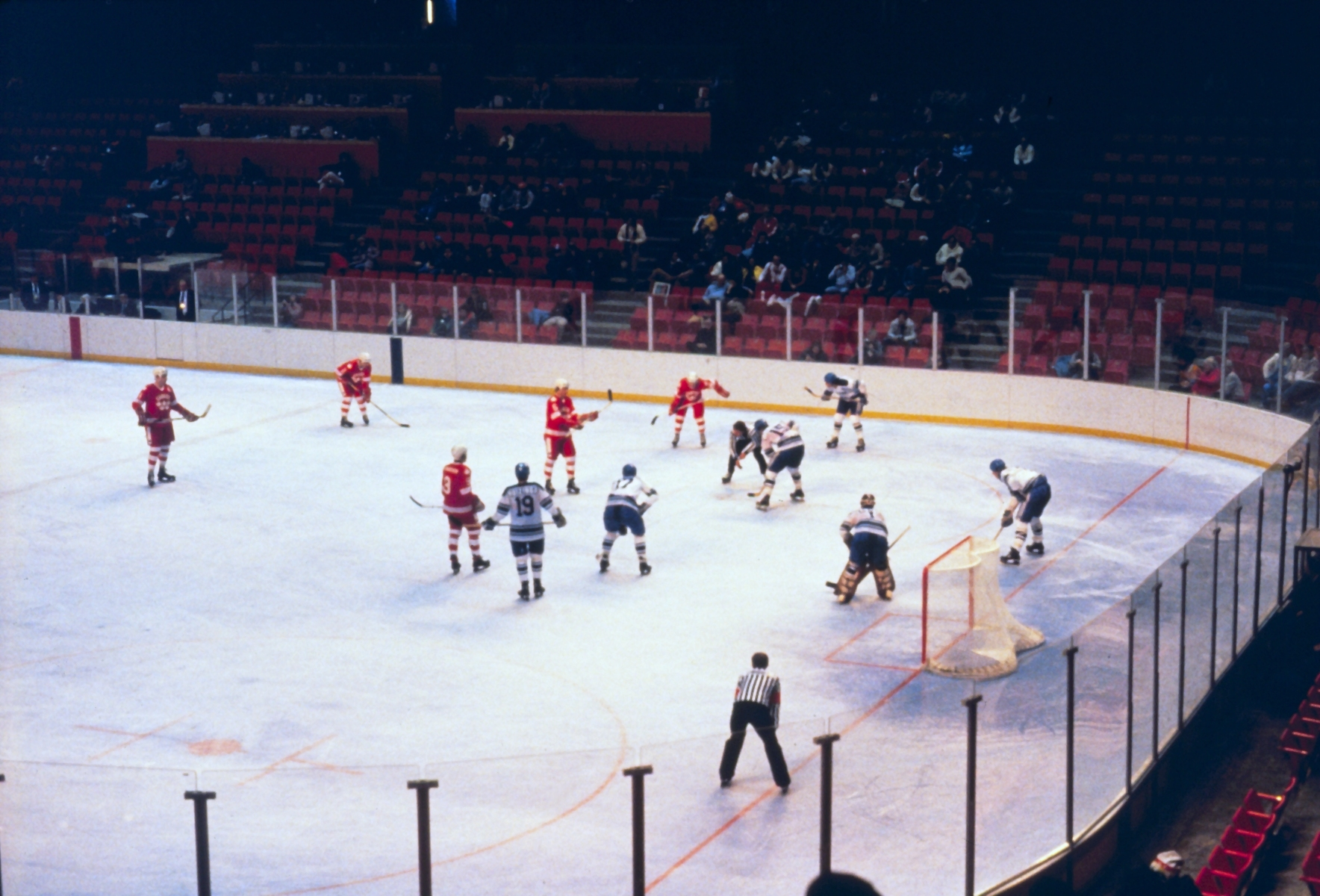
While Johnson was president, the CAHA agreed to return to international competition at the World Championships in 1977 and at the Winter Olympics in 1980 (Canada vs. Netherlands pictured).

Johnson was re-elected president of the CAHA by acclamation in May 1976, and looked to implement a national championship for the senior intermediate division which only had regional playoffs. The WCHL issues were settled with the approval to have affiliated lower-level junior teams in Western Canada. Johnson and the Labatt Brewing Company announced a long-term sponsorship to improve the National Coaching Certification Program, which expected to raise the calibre of instruction of coaches with the influx of money and marketing.

In May 1976, the CAHA approved a return to ice hockey at the Olympic Games in 1980, where professionals were not allowed and only amateurs were eligible. Father David Bauer was named to oversee the committee for Canada's return to the Olympics. Hockey Canada restructured its board of directors in July 1976 to include more groups involved in professional and amateur hockey. Johnson held one of the two CAHA seats to represent amateur hockey, along with one seat held by the Canadian Interuniversity Athletics Union.

Johnson sat on the directing committee for the 1976 Canada Cup. The tournament reported a profit of $2.2-million, which helped funding for Canada's national team. Johnson sat on the business committee to review the finances for the upcoming 1977 Ice Hockey World Championships. He stated the possibility that Canada might be represented by a junior all-star team at the World Championships if professional players were unavailable, and noted that failure to send a team would likely mean the end of all international games involving Canada. The IIHF agreed to delay the tournament by two weeks, which allowed Canada to access more professionals who were no longer active in NHL or WHA playoffs.

China invited another Canadian amateur team for an instructional tour and requested the CAHA bring along referees to teach Chinese on-ice officials. Johnson felt that the invitation showed Canada had teams which could play the game in a sportsmanlike manner, despite its reputation for physical play internationally. He also arranged an exchange for Chinese players and coaches to attend professional and junior training camps in Canada, and hoped for the China men's national ice hockey team to visit. Johnson later accompanied the Toronto Varsity Blues men's ice hockey team to China in December 1976.

The CAHA continued to have disagreements with the WHA regarding payments for junior-aged players signed to contracts. Johnson and Hockey Canada attempted to force the WHA into negotiations by using the CAHA membership in the IIHF to block the WHA from gaining approval to play games against European teams. The issues were still unresolved by May 1977 and Canadian junior leagues prepared a lawsuit to get compensation.

Johnson was succeeded by Gord Renwick as CAHA president in May 1977, and was a candidate to replace Gordon Juckes as the CAHA executive director when the latter retired in 1977. Johnson instead served as chairman of the 1978 World Junior Ice Hockey Championships in his role as past-president.

== Other sporting interests ==
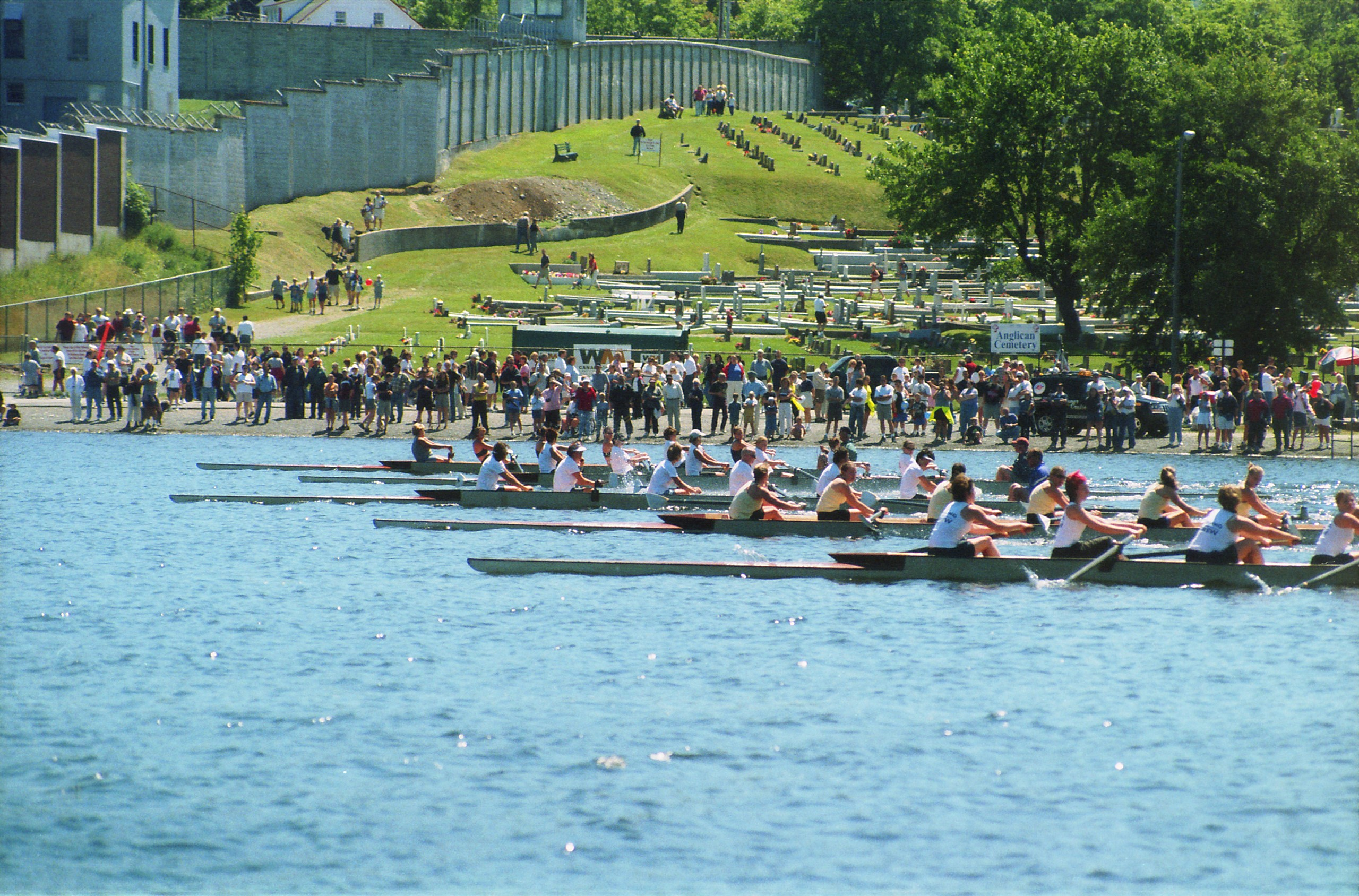
Royal St. John's Regatta on Quidi Vidi Lake in August 2000.

Johnson was involved in other sporting interests at the national and provincial level. He was a director of the Sports Federation of Canada and the National Sport Recreation Centre. He served as chairman of the Interprovincial Sports and Recreation Council and was a member of the Canada Games council. He was a director of the Youth Bowling Council of Canada, a delegate to the Canadian Amateur Swimming Association, and sat on the board of governors for Canada's Sports Hall of Fame. He served as treasurer of the Newfoundland Amateur Sports Federation, and was an executive member of the Newfoundland and Labrador Amateur Sports Federation. He also served as the assistant deputy Newfoundland Minister of Sport during the late 1970s.

Johnson served as president of the St. John's Senior Men's Softball League from 1972 to 1976, was the treasurer of Softball Newfoundland from 1972 to 1974, and sat on the hosting committee for the 1978 Canadian Junior Men's Softall Championships. He was a member of the Royal St. John's Regatta committee for 16 years from 1986, after previously being connected to rowing for 12 years in his civil servant role. He served as a director, secretary, treasurer, and vice-president, then was the president from 1993 to 1994. He was also chairman of the Royal St. John's Regatta Hall of Fame, served as captain-of-the-course in recreational regattas and time trials, and collaborated with Frederick Russell and Geoff Carnell to get permission to use the Royal prefix for the Regatta.

Johnson was part of the St. John's Capitals senior hockey team managing committee during the 1970s. He became a sports columnist for The Evening Telegram in 1990. He sat on the board of directors for the St. John's Maple Leafs from 1991 to 1995, and the charitable Leafs Foundation from 1995 to 2005. He was also a director for the Bally Haly Golf & Curling Club, chairman of the St. John's Figure Skating Club carnival committee, and a commodore of the Terra Nova Yacht Club.

== Personal life ==
Johnson was married to Florence Helen Harris, had three children, and was Roman Catholic. After his career at the Bank of Nova Scotia ended, he worked as a civil servant and was the assistant deputy minister for the Newfoundland Department of Rehabilitation and Recreation, and was an administrator for Newfoundland Parks. He volunteered as president of the Newfoundland Lung Association, sat on the board of directors for the Duke of Edinburgh's International Award and was chairman of the Williams Family Foundation. He also served on the board of directors for the Newfoundland Tuberculosis and Respiratory Disease Association and the Association for the Help of Retarded Children. Johnson died on May 12, 2012, in St. John's at age 82, and was interred at Holy Sepulchre Cemetery in Mount Pearl.

== Honours and legacy ==
Johnson was named the CAHA executive of the year when he completed his second term as president in 1977, and was named a life member of the CAHA in May 1982. The Don Johnson Cup was established in 1982, to be awarded for the junior-B hockey championship of Atlantic Canada. At the end of inaugural competition for the cup, Johnson awarded the trophy to his own son as the assistant captain of the St. John's Jr. Celtics. The trophy was renamed to the Don Johnson Memorial Cup in 2013. Hockey Canada credited Johnson for playing an important role in Canada's return to international competitions and improving Canada's international hockey reputation.

The NAHA presented Johnson the outstanding service award for minor hockey in 1971, and the Gold Stick Award in 1977 for service to hockey in the province. He was made a life member of the NAHA in 1985, and was inducted into the builder category of the Newfoundland Hockey Hall of Fame in 1994. In 2011, the Metro Minor Hockey League was renamed the Don Johnson Hockey League in his honour, to serve competitive minor ice hockey in the greater St. John's area.

Johnson was inducted into the builder category of the Softball Newfoundland Hall of Fame in 1977, is an honorary lifemember of Softball Newfoundland, and was inducted into the St. John's Softball Hall of Fame. He received the President's Cup from Rowing Canada in 1995, was made a life member of the Royal St. John's Regatta committee in 2001, and inducted into the Royal St. John's Regatta Hall of Fame in 2005.

The Newfoundland and Labrador Sports Hall of Fame inducted Johnson into their builder category in 1982. Other honours were induction into the Canada Games Council Hall of Honour, and life memberships with Sport Newfoundland and Labrador and the Sports Federation of Canada. Johnson was posthumously inducted into the Newfoundland and Labrador Volunteer Hall of Fame in 2018, and given a tribute in the Newfoundland House of Assembly on May 14, 2012, by Derrick Dalley, the Minister of Tourism, Culture and Recreation.

== Bibliography ==
- Canadian Amateur Hockey Association (1990). Constitution, By-laws, Regulations, History. Gloucester, Ontario.
- Smallwood, Joseph R.; Poole, Cyril F.; Cuff, Robert, eds. (1991). "Johnson, Donald Stewart". Encyclopedia of Newfoundland and Labrador. Vol. 3. St. John's, Newfoundland and Labrador: Harry Cuff Publications.
- Ferguson, Bob (2005). Who's Who in Canadian Sport, Volume 4. Markham, Ontario: Fitzhenry & Whiteside. ISBN 1-55041-855-6.
- Murphy, Dee (2010). Our Sports: The Games and Athletes and Newfoundland and Labrador. St. John's, Newfoundland and Labrador: James Lane Publishing. ISBN 9781895109719.
