= List of ice hockey teams in Newfoundland and Labrador =

The following is a list of ice hockey teams in Newfoundland and Labrador, past and present. It includes the league(s) they play for, and championships won.

== Professional ==
=== American Hockey League ===
Team	City	Existed	Calder Cups	Notes
St. John's IceCaps	St. John's	2015–2017	0	Relocation of the Hamilton Bulldogs
St. John's IceCaps	St. John's	2011–2015	0	Relocation of the Manitoba Moose
St. John's Maple Leafs	St. John's	1991–2005	0	Became the Toronto Marlies in 2005

=== East Coast Hockey League ===
Team	City	Existed	Kelly Cups	Notes
Newfoundland Growlers	St. John's	2018–2024	1	Ceased operations before conclusion of 2023-24 ECHL season.

== Junior ==
=== Quebec Major Junior Hockey League ===
Team	City	Existed	President's Cups	Memorial Cups	Notes
St. John's Fog Devils	St. John's	2005-08	0	0	Became the Montreal Junior Hockey Club in 2008

=== St. John's Junior Hockey League ===
Team	City	Notes
The Bigs Avalon Jr. Celtics	St. John's	Formerly known as the Avalon Jr. Capitals
CBR Jr. Renegades	Conception Bay South	
CBN Jr. Stars	Bay Roberts	
Northeast Jr. Eagles	Torbay	
Mount Pearl Jr. Blades	Mount Pearl	
Paradise Jr. Warriors	Paradise	
St. John's Jr. Caps	St. John's	
Southern Shore Jr. Breakers	Witless Bay	
Defunct
Trinity-Placentia Jr. Flyers	Whitbourne	2011-2021

=== Central/West Junior Hockey League ===
Team	City	Seasons	League Titles	Notes
Bay St. George Jets	Stephenville	2005–2007	0	
Bishop's Falls Junior Express	Bishop's Falls	2005–Present	5	Formerly the Central Junior Cataracts based in Grand Falls-Windsor
Corner Brook Junior Royals	Corner Brook	2005–2006, 2008-2011	0	Became Humber Valley Junior Red Wings prior to 11/12 season.
Deer Lake Junior Red Wings	Deer Lake	2007–2009	0	Moved to Stephenville prior to 09/10 season.
Humber Valley Junior Red Wings	Deer Lake	2011-2012	1	Folded after winning 2012 Championship
Port-aux-Basques Junior Mariners	Port-aux-Basques	2009–Present	0	
Stephenville Junior Jets	Stephenville	2009–Present	0	Formerly "Stephenville Red Wings" and "Deer Lake Junior Red Wings"
Triton DRL Roadrunners	Triton	2007–2008	1	

== Senior ==
=== Newfoundland West Coast Senior Hockey League ===
Team	City	Existed	League Titles	Herder Titles	Allan Cups	Notes
Bay of Islands Bruins	Corner Brook	2003–2004	0	0	0	
Clarenville Caribous	Clarenville	2007-	3	3	1	Won Allan Cup in 2011
Corner Brook Royals	Corner Brook	1935–1990, 2000-	4	10	1	Won Allan Cup in 1986 and Bolton in 1985 and 1986
Deer Lake Red Wings	Deer Lake	2000-2011	3	2	0	
Grand Falls-Windsor Cataracts	Grand Falls-Windsor	1935	????	12 (incl. 5 as Andcos, 1 as All-Stars)	0	
Port aux Basques Mariners	Port aux Basques	1984–86, 1989, 2000-01	0	1	0	Won Hardy Cup in 1989 as Canadian Senior B Champions
Stephenville Jets	Stephenville	1976–1990, 2001–2002	4	2	0	

=== Avalon East Senior Hockey League ===
Team	City	Existed	League Titles	Herder Titles	Allan Cups	Home
Conception Bay Cee Bee Stars	Harbour Grace	1958–1970, 2006-2014	????	8	0	S.W. Moores Memorial Stadium
H.J. Bartlett Electric Mount Pearl Blades	Mount Pearl	????	????	0	0	Mount Pearl Glacier
Southern Shore Breakers (leave of absence 2010-11 season)	Mobile	0	0	5	0	
Northeast Eagles	Torbay	2008	0	0	0	Jack Byrne Arena
Bell Island Blues	Bell Island	2008	0	0	0	Monsignor Bartlett Memorial Arena
Mount Pearl Samurai	Mount Pearl	2012 -	0	0	0	The Glacier

== League, regional and national championships ==
Championship	Times won	Description
Allan Cup	3	Canadian senior national championship
Bolton Cup	2	Eastern Canadian senior championship
Don Johnson Cup	6	Atlantic Canada Junior B championship
Kelly Cup	1	ECHL championship

== See also ==
- Herder Memorial Trophy
- Hockey Newfoundland and Labrador
