= Gordon Juckes =

Canadian ice hockey administrator (1914–1994)

Gordon Juckes CM MBE CD
- Born: June 20, or June 30, 1914; Watrous, Saskatchewan, Canada
- Died: October 4, 1994 (aged 80); London, Ontario, Canada
- Occupations: Ice hockey administrator; Newspaper publisher
- Known for: CAHA executive director; IIHF council member
- Awards: Order of Canada; Canada's Sports Hall of Fame; Hockey Hall of Fame; IIHF Hall of Fame
- Military career
- Allegiance: Canada
- Branch: Royal Canadian Artillery
- Service years: 1940–1945
- Rank: Major
- Conflicts: World War II
- Awards: Order of the British Empire; Canadian Forces' Decoration

Gordon Wainwright Juckes CM MBE CD (/dʒuːks/; June 20 or 30, 1914 – October 4, 1994) was a Canadian ice hockey administrator. He served as the president and later the executive director of the Canadian Amateur Hockey Association (CAHA), and as a council member of the International Ice Hockey Federation. Juckes became involved in hockey as newspaper publisher and team president, then served as president of the Saskatchewan Amateur Hockey Association. During World War II he was a Major in the Royal Canadian Artillery, and was honoured with the Order of the British Empire.

Juckes was the first full-time employee of the CAHA, and a key proponent for the early development of the Canada men's national ice hockey team and the 1972 Summit Series. He worked to promote minor ice hockey and player safety in Canada, and his efforts with the IIHF established the IIHF World U20 Championship. After 31 years as a hockey administrator, he was made a Member of the Order of Canada. He was also inducted into the Hockey Hall of Fame, Canada's Sports Hall of Fame, and the IIHF Hall of Fame.

== Early life and military service ==
Gordon Wainwright Juckes was born in Watrous, Saskatchewan, on either June 20, or June 30, 1914, depending on the source. He played hockey in Melville, Saskatchewan as a youth. He quit hockey at age 18 when he did not make the local junior team as a right-winger. He worked for the local Melville Advance newspaper as a printer, reporter, advertising salesman, and collections agent, and later became its publisher and owner.

Juckes enlisted in the Royal Canadian Artillery as a gunner in 1940, and was later promoted to the rank of major. For his service during World War II, he was appointed a Member of the Order of the British Empire (MBE) on December 15, 1945. He was also honoured with a Canadian Forces' Decoration.

Juckes returned to Saskatchewan after the war, serving as president of the Melville Millionaires hockey team from 1946 until 1948. He was then elected president of the Saskatchewan Senior Hockey League, and joined the Saskatchewan Amateur Hockey Association (SAHA) executive committee. Juckes continued his work with the Melville Advance, and in 1951 was appointed Melville's civil defence officer. Later in 1951, he became vice-president of the SAHA, and coordinated coaches' and referees's training programs. He was elected president of the SAHA in 1953, and served until 1955.

== Canadian national hockey ==
Juckes joined the Canadian Amateur Hockey Association (CAHA) executive in 1955, serving as second vice-president until 1957. In this role, he was also the chairman of minor ice hockey in Canada, and organized the first "Young Canada Hockey Week" held from February 4 to 11, 1957. The event was supported by the CAHA and its affiliate branches, and served to promote participation in minor ice hockey with expanded newspaper, radio, television coverage. The event gained recognition for Juckes' efforts in a letter from prime minister Louis St. Laurent.

Juckes served as first vice-president of the CAHA from 1957 to 1959. During this time, he spoke before the American Hockey Coaches Association in an attempt to stop the unregulated recruitment of Canadian hockey players to American schools on scholarships, which prevented Canadians from keeping amateur status for international competitions, and depleted the rosters of Canadian teams during the season. Juckes served as president of the CAHA for one year from 1959 to 1960, succeeding Robert Lebel. He held talks with the Western Intercollegiate Hockey Association to curb further player recruitment, this time supported by Clarence Campbell of the National Hockey League.

Juckes was named secretary-manager of CAHA on May 24, 1960, after the death of George Dudley, becoming the first western Canadian to hold the post. Changes were proposed to the constitution at the same time to give broader powers to the secretary-manager position, which was already considered the most powerful position within the CAHA. The position was combined into a dual role with the registrar-treasurer position when W. A. Hewitt announced his planned retirement, and Juckes' expected salary was raised to $6,500 per year plus expenses. Juckes became the CAHA's first full-time employee with the appointment. Jack Roxburgh was named the new president of the CAHA on May 27 to fill the vacant position. Juckes worked mostly by himself doing CAHA administration, with only a part-time secretary assisting with correspondence. The dual roles of registrar-treasurer, and secretary-manager were formally combined into the title of executive director in 1968, which he held until 1977. He was the CAHA delegate to the International Ice Hockey Federation from 1960 to 1977, and was an IIHF director from 1966 to 1972.

Juckes authored a report for the CAHA after Canada's 1960 Winter Olympics results, arguing for more coherence and continuity in its international representatives, as opposed to sending amateur club teams. He supported giving financial assistance to teams representing Canada, instead of the clubs raising funds on their own for travel costs to international events. In 1962, Father David Bauer made his proposal to start a Canadian national team in a meeting with Juckes and CAHA president Art Potter. Juckes supported Bauer's proposal, and advocated it with the rest of the CAHA executive. He helped set up the national team with Father Bauer in 1962, then established the first CAHA office in Winnipeg in 1964. Juckes later facilitated the joint effort between Bauer's national team with the Winnipeg Maroons to perpetuate the national team program by bringing in more coaches and players, effectively merging the two teams. He also supported creating a second national squad prior to the 1968 Winter Olympics, to have more players with the same type of training and experiences to increase the talent pool, also to reduce the workload of extensive exhibitions tours through Europe.

Juckes was chosen to be part of the Canadian delegation to the meetings in 1969, which aimed to negotiate the use of professionals in IIHF competitions, before Canada ultimately withdrew from international competition in 1970. Later the same year, he and the CAHA offices relocated to Ottawa. Juckes and the CAHA cooperated with Charles Hay of Hockey Canada to persuade the Soviet national team to take part in what became the 1972 Summit Series. Juckes is also credited with the efforts that established the World Junior Championship. He used his position as an IIHF director to negotiate an upper age limit of 20 for the juniors, which had been a main point of contention with European delegates, and prevented any previous agreement for sanctioned events. The first official tournament was the 1977 World Junior Ice Hockey Championships.

During his tenure with the CAHA, Juckes supported having rules to limit body contact in minor hockey, and he was responsible to implement helmet safety rules. He was considered an authority for interpreting CAHA by-laws and hockey rules, and was well respected for his ability to negotiate with Europeans. He sat on the board of the Canadian Olympic Association and of Hockey Canada.

Juckes retired as executive director of the CAHA in 1977, and was replaced by David Branch. In an interview he gave in May 1979, Juckes said that Canada's withdrawal from international competition in 1970 was the toughest decision he had been involved with, and was something he opposed. He felt it more effective to host the 1970 World Ice Hockey Championships under protest, then withdraw if necessary. Juckes also mentioned that the withdrawal of the Western Canadian Hockey League teams from the CAHA was one of his biggest regrets.

== Hockey honours and awards ==
Year	Honours and awards
1962	AHAUS citation award
1967	IIHF Diploma of Honour
1975	OHA Gold Stick
1976	CAHA Executive of the Year
1976	CAHA Order of Merit
1976	SAHA Life Member
1977	IIHF Life Member
1979	Hockey Hall of Fame
1979	CAHA Life Member
1980	Member of the Order of Canada
1980	Saskatchewan Sports Hall of Fame
1981	Canada's Sports Hall of Fame
1997	IIHF Hall of Fame
2012	Saskatchewan Hockey Hall of Fame

Juckes received the AHAUS citation award in 1962, for appreciation of contributions in American amateur hockey. He was honoured in 1976 as the CAHA Executive of the Year, received the CAHA Order of Merit, and was named a life member of the SAHA. When he retired in 1977, he was made a life member of the IIHF. Two years later, Juckes was inducted into the Hockey Hall of Fame, and was made a life member of the CAHA. He became a Member of the Order of Canada in 1980, and was inducted into the Saskatchewan Sports Hall of Fame. In 1981, he was inducted into Canada's Sports Hall of Fame.

The CAHA Hockey Development Council established the Gordon Juckes Award in 1981 to recognize an individual for significant contribution to amateur hockey in Canada at the national level. Nominees for the award may be involved in research, sports medicine, psychology, coaching, officiating, or administration.

In 1994, the CAHA set up the Gordon Juckes Memorial Trust to benefit a worthwhile team or individual each year. Juckes was posthumously inducted into the IIHF Hall of Fame, being among the first group of honourees in 1997, and was inducted into the Saskatchewan Hockey Hall of Fame in 2012.

== Personal life ==
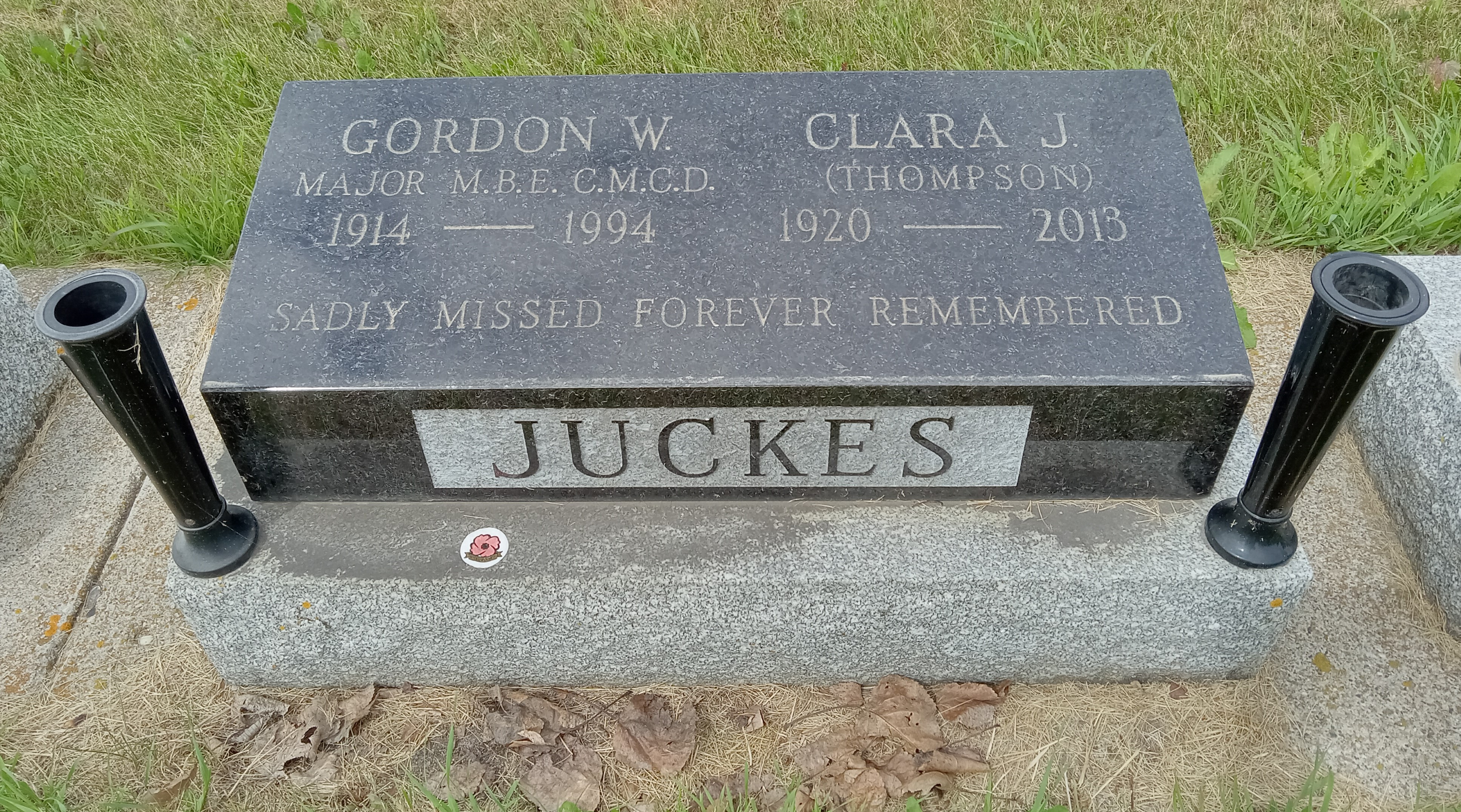
Juckes's grave marker in the Melville Cemetery

Juckes was married with two sons and two daughters, and was a cousin of NHL player Bing Juckes. After retiring from the CAHA, he lived in Zurich, Ontario. He was attending the 1994 Men's World Ice Hockey Championships in Italy when he suffered a heart attack, but was able to see Canada win the gold medal from his hospital bed via a recording. He died October 4, 1994, in London, Ontario.

Juckes was remembered by past CAHA presidents Fred Page and Don Johnson. Page said, "He was a wonderful man as far as hockey is concerned. He put a lot of time into amateur hockey". Johnson said, "He was a tower of strength, a world of wisdom, just a wonderful man".

== Bibliography ==
- Stoffel, Holden (2007). Saskatchewan Sports: Lives Past and Present. Regina, Saskatchewan: Canadian Plains Research Center, University of Regina. ISBN 978-0-88977-167-3.
- Oliver, Greg (2017). Father Bauer and the Great Experiment: The Genesis of Canadian Olympic Hockey. Toronto, Ontario: ECW Press. ISBN 978-1-77041-249-1.
- McKinley, Michael (2014). It's Our Game: Celebrating 100 Years Of Hockey Canada. Toronto, Ontario: Viking Press. ISBN 978-0-670-06817-3.
- Constitution, By-laws, Regulations, History. Gloucester, Ontario: Canadian Amateur Hockey Association. May 1990.
