= Hockey Newfoundland and Labrador =

Canadian ice hockey governing body

- Sport: Ice hockey
- Jurisdiction: Newfoundland and Labrador
- Abbreviation: HNL
- Founded: 1935

Official website
- www.hockeynl.ca
- (Canada)
- (Newfoundland and Labrador)

Hockey Newfoundland and Labrador (HNL) is the governing body of all amateur hockey ice hockey in Newfoundland and Labrador, Canada. Hockey Newfoundland and Labrador is a branch of Hockey Canada.

== History ==
The first governing body of ice hockey in Newfoundland was the Newfoundland Hockey Association, which was formed either in 1898 or 1899. Hockey Newfoundland and Labrador (HNL) was founded as the Newfoundland Amateur Hockey Association (NAHA) on December 19, 1935 in the Duckworth St, St. John's Law offices of Robert S. Furlong to govern hockey in all regions of Newfoundland. Furlong was the first President of NAHA and kept that position until 1952.

Don Johnson was elected president of the NAHA in 1966 and wanted to expand minor ice hockey as one of its permanent programs. He expected that the NAHA could join the Canadian Amateur Hockey Association (CAHA) within five years if the terms of affiliation were acceptable, and to be admitted independent of and equal to the Maritime Amateur Hockey Association. He sought for the CAHA to accommodate more NAHA requests than in previous offers of affiliation, which included the NAHA keeping regulations which allowed a paid player-coach and the occasional professional player on a roster. The NAHA also wanted its senior league to have shorter playoffs for the Allan Cup instead of an interlocking schedule with teams from the Maritimes. In May 1966, Johnson reached an agreement with CAHA president Lionel Fleury who accepted the NAHA as a branch member for the 1966–67 season. Johnson stated that despite Newfoundland becoming Canada's tenth province in 1949, the NAHA took 17 years to affiliate with the CAHA "through lack of information, misinterpretation of correspondence and other factors".

The following year, a Newfoundland championship team participated in the Allan Cup playoffs for the first time. NAHA was renamed the Newfoundland & Labrador Hockey Association (NLHA) in 1999 and later renamed Hockey Newfoundland & Labrador (HNL).

=== IIHF membership ===
In 1933, the Dominion of Newfoundland, which at the time was separate from Canada, joined the International Ice Hockey Federation (IIHF). Newfoundland did not participate in any Ice Hockey World Championships and was expelled from the IIHF in 1936.

== Trophies and awards ==
=== Minor hockey ===
The U13-U18 Provincial Championships, also known as the "Coupe de Terre-Neuve" in Saint Pierre and Miquelon French, are organized throughout the province and in Saint Pierre and Miquelon.

=== Junior hockey ===
The Veitch Memorial Trophy is awarded to the junior champion team.

=== Senior hockey ===
The Herder Memorial Trophy is awarded to the senior championship team. The Evening Telegram Trophy is awarded to the senior hockey team with the best record (best winning average) in the regular season.

The Gus Soper Memorial Award is presented to the most valuable player in NL senior hockey in the regular season. The President's Award is presented to the top goaltender in NL senior hockey in the regular season. The Howie Clouter Memorial Trophy is presented to the most gentlemanly and effective player in NL senior hockey in the regular season.

==== S. E. Tuma Memorial Trophy ====
S. E. Tuma Memorial Trophy
- Sport: Ice hockey
- Awarded for: Top scorer in the regular season in an active Newfoundland & Labrador senior hockey league

History
- First award: 1968
- Most recent: Matthew Thomey (of HGOE CeeBee Stars)

The S. E. Tuma Memorial Trophy is awarded to the top scorer in NL senior hockey in the regular season.

In 1968 Corner Brook businessman Elias Tuma donated a trophy as a memorial to his late father Simon to be presented annually to the most prolific scorer in the Newfoundland Senior Hockey League (NSHL). The trophy was first presented at the end of the 1968-1969 season.

The NSHL ceased operations in 1989 and the trophy was not awarded in 1990, 1991 or 1992. From 1993 though 2011, the S.E. Tuma Memorial Trophy was awarded to the top scorer of the active provincial senior "A" leagues. The Newfoundland Senior Hockey League reformed for three seasons from 2011-2014. The trophy was not awarded in 2015 but since 2016 it has once again been awarded to the top scorer of the active provincial senior "A" leagues.

Note: AESHL = Avalon East Senior Hockey League, AWSHL = Avalon West Senior Hockey League, CBSHL = Central Beothuck Senior Hockey League

S.E. Tuma Memorial Trophy winners
Year	Winner	Team (league)	Points
1969	Jacques Allard	Gander Flyers (NSHL)	126 (50G 76A)
1970	Frank "Danky" Dorrington	Corner Brook Royals (NSHL)	118
1971	Jack Faulkner	Gander Flyers	74
1972	Wayne Maxner	Gander Flyers	111
1973	Frank "Danky" Dorrington	Corner Brook Royals	67
1974	Frank "Danky" Dorrington	Corner Brook Royals	101
1975	Charlie Greene	Grand Falls Cataracts	46
1976	Gene Faulkner	Grand Falls Cataracts	39
1977	Dennis Goulding	Grand Falls Cataracts	91
1978	Randy Pearcey	St. John's Blue Caps	106
1979	Edward Philpott	Gander Flyers	126
1980	Zane Forbes	Gander Flyers	94
1981	Randy Pearcey	St. John's Blue Caps	86
1982	Bruce Campbell	Grand Falls Cataracts	75
1983	Bruce Campbell	Stephenville Jets	73
1984	Juan Strickland	Port aux Basques Mariners	92
1985	Juan Strickland	Port aux Basques Mariners	88
1986	Robert Forbes	Corner Brook Royals	117
1987	Andy Sullivan	St. John's Capitals	130
1988	Craig Jenkins	Corner Brook Royals	157
1989	Andy Sullivan	St. John's Capitals	106
1993	Andy Sullivan	Pouch Cove Hawks	63
1994	Andy Sullivan	Southern Shore Breakers	49
1995	Andy Sullivan	Southern Shore Breakers	100
1996	Dennis Strong	Conception Bay CeeBees	59
1997	Derrick Dalley	Twillingate Combines	45
1998	Scott Sullivan	Southern Shore Breakers	117
1999	Ed Russell	Conception Bay CeeBees	71 points
2012	Ryan Desrosiers	Clarenville Caribous (NSHL)	39 (18G 21A)
2013	Andrew Sweetland	Clarenville Caribous (NSHL)	42 (18G 24A)
2014	Ron Hennigar	Grand Falls-Windsor Cataracts (NSHL)	48 (11G 37A)
2015	Not awarded		
2016	Chris Sparkes	Northeast Eagles (AESHL)	48 (22G 26A)
2017	Matthew Thomey	HGOE CeeBee Stars (AESHL)	34 (14G 20A)

== Leagues and associations ==
Senior hockey

- Avalon East Senior Hockey League
- Central West Senior Hockey League
- West Coast Senior Hockey League

Junior leagues

- St. John's Junior Hockey League (Junior "B")
- Central/West Junior Hockey League (Junior "B")

Defunct leagues

- West Coast Senior Hockey League
- Newfoundland Hockey League
- Newfoundland Senior Hockey League

== See also ==
- List of ice hockey teams in Newfoundland and Labrador
