= Veitch Memorial Trophy =

Junior ice hockey championship

The Veitch Memorial Trophy is the Junior ice hockey Grand Championship of Newfoundland and Labrador. The trophy is awarded by Hockey Newfoundland and Labrador.

== History ==
The trophy is named after Cyril Veitch a former executive of the Newfoundland Amateur Hockey Association.

In the mid-1970s, Junior hockey in Newfoundland was granted Junior A classification. The winner of the Veitch Memorial Trophy was granted the right to represent Newfoundland in the Centennial Cup playdowns. Since the early 1980s, the winner of the Veitch Memorial Trophy is granted the right to play in the Don Johnson Cup to determine the Atlantic Junior B champion.

== Leagues currently in competition ==
- St. John's Junior Hockey League (SJJHL)

=== Former leagues ===
- Newfoundland Junior A Hockey League (NJAHL)
- Central Beothuk Junior Hockey League (CBJHL)
- Central-West Junior Hockey League (CWJHL)

== Champions ==
National Junior B Level

- 1953 - Grand Falls
- 1954 - Grand Falls
- 1955 - Bell Island
- 1956 - St. John's
- 1957 - Grand Falls
- 1958 - St. John's
- 1959 - St. John's
- 1960 - Grand Falls Jays defeated St. John's Jr. Capitals 2-games-to-none
- 1961 - St. John's
- 1962 - Grand Falls
- 1963 - St. John's
- 1964 - No Competition
- 1965 - St. John's
- 1966 - Corner Brook
- 1967 - No Competition
- 1968 - No Competition
- 1969 - Grand Falls
- 1970 - St. John's Jr. Capitals
- 1971 - St. John's Jr. Capitals defeated Corner Brook Jr. Royals 2-games-to-1

National Junior A Level - Winner moves on to Centennial Cup

- 1972 - St. John's Jr. Capitals defeated Gander Jr. Flyers 2-games-to-1
- 1973 - Buchans Miners defeated Gander Jr. Flyers 4-games-to-3
- 1974 - Gander Jr. Flyers defeated Bay St. George Huskies 4-games-to-1
- 1975 - Gander Jr. Flyers defeated Clarenville Caribous 4-games-to-none
- 1976 - No Competition
- 1977 - Corner Brook Jr. Royals defeated St. John's Jr. Capitals 2-games-to-1

National Junior B Level

- 1978 - No Competition
- 1979 - Grand Falls
- 1980 - St. John's Blue Caps defeated Corner Brook Jr. Royals
- 1981 - Gander Jr. Flyers

Winner moves on to Don Johnson Cup

- 1982 - St. John's Celtics
- 1983 - Gander Jr. Flyers defeated St. John's Jr. Shamrocks 4-3 (Tournament Play)
- 1984 - St. John's Jr. 50's defeated St. John's Jr. Shamrocks 6-5 (Tournament Play)
- 1985 - St. John's Junior 50's
- 1986 - Mount Pearl Blades
- 1987 - St. John's Jr. 50's defeated Clarenville Caribous 7-6 (Tournament Play)
- 1988-94 - No Competition
- 1995 - St. John's Celtics
- 1996 - Deer Lake Video Juniors
- 1997 - Bell Island Junior Blues
- 1998 - Bell Island Junior Blues
- 1999 - No Competition
- 2000 - Conception Bay North Jr. Stars defeated St. John's Jr. Celtics 5-1 (Tournament Play)
- 2001 - St. John's Jr. Celtics defeated Avalon Jr. Capitals 4-3 (Tournament Play)
- 2002 - St. John's Jr. Capitals defeated Labrador West Black Bears 2-games-to-none
- 2003 - St. John's Jr. Celtics defeated Trinity-Placentia Flyers 6-1 (Tournament Play)
- 2004 - No Competition
- 2005 - Trinity-Placentia Flyers defeated Central Jr. Arctic Blast 6-1 (Tournament Play)
- 2006 - Conception Bay North Jr. Stars defeated Central Jr. Arctic Blast 2-games-to-1
- 2007 - Bell Island Jr. Blues defeated Mount Pearl Jr. Blades 2-1 (Tournament Play)
- 2008 - St. John's Jr. Celtics defeated Bell Island Jr. Blues 3-2 2OT (Tournament Play)
- 2009 - St. John's Jr. Caps defeated Central Jr. Cataracts 7-4 (Tournament Play)
- 2010 - St. John's Jr. Caps defeated Central Jr. Cataracts 2-games-to-none
- 2011 - St. John's Jr. Celtics defeated Central Jr. Cataracts 2-1 (Tournament Play)
- 2012 - St. John's Jr. Caps defeated Mount Pearl Jr. Blades 4-3 OT (Tournament Play)
- 2013 - St. John's Jr. Caps defeated Stephenville Jr. Jets 15-2 (Tournament Play)
- 2014 - No Competition
- 2015 - No Competition
- 2016 - No Competition
