= Frederick Russell =

Lieutenant Governor of Newfoundland

The Honourable Frederick William Russell OC CD

9th Lieutenant Governor of Newfoundland
- In office November 5, 1991 – February 5, 1997
- Monarch: Elizabeth II
- Governors General: Ray Hnatyshyn; Roméo LeBlanc
- Premier: Clyde Wells; Brian Tobin
- Preceded by: James McGrath
- Succeeded by: Arthur Maxwell House

Personal details
- Born: September 10, 1923 St. John's, Dominion of Newfoundland
- Died: June 20, 2001 (aged 77) St. John's, Newfoundland
- Spouse: Margaret (Peggy) Miriam (Cross)
- Children: Douglas, Janice, James, Peter

Military service
- Allegiance: Canada
- Branch/service: Royal Canadian Air Force
- Battles/wars: Second World War

Frederick William Russell, OC CD KStJ (September 10, 1923 - June 20, 2001) was a Canadian businessman and the ninth lieutenant governor of Newfoundland.

Born in St. John's, he studied at Dalhousie University and the Atlantic School for Advanced Business Administration. He was a fighter pilot with the Royal Canadian Air Force during World War II in which he flew the de Havilland Mosquito. He was president of Blue Peter Steamships 1949-1972. He was President of Terra Nova Motors Ltd. 1962-1979

He was a member of the Newfoundland Labour Relations Board for over 35 years.

He was a member of the Board of Regents, Memorial University of Newfoundland 1961-1982. Chairman from 1974-1982.

He was a founding member in 1950 of the Royal Canadian Air Cadets in St. John's.

He was Honorary Aide-de-Camp (RCAF, Newfoundland) for Governors General Massey and Vanier 1955-1963

He was Honorary Aide-de-Camp (RCAF) for Lieutenant Governor Sir Leonard Outerbridge and Lieutenant Governor Honourable Campbell MacPherson, Newfoundland. 1954-1962

He was Honorary Colonel 103 Rescue Unit, Gander, NL. 1992-1995.

He was Honorary Colonel 5 Wing Goose Bay, NL 1995-1998

He was Honorary Colonel 9 Wing Gander, NL 1995-

In 1976 he was conferred an Honorary Doctor of Laws Degree (LL.D) by Memorial University of Newfoundland

From November 5, 1991 to February 5, 1997, he was the Lieutenant-Governor of Newfoundland.

In 1979, he was made a Member of the Order of Canada and was promoted to Officer in 1999.

Russell, Don Johnson, and Geoff Carnell collaborated in the effort to get permission to use the royal designation for the Royal St. John's Regatta in 1993.

== Arms ==
Coat of arms of Frederick Russell
Notes The arms of Frederick Russell consist of: Crest Above a helmet mantled Gules doubled Argent on a wreath of these colours a goat statant Argent armed and unguled Gules its dexter foreleg resting on a closed book bound Gules clasped and charged with a cross moline Or between two bars gemel wavy Argent. Escutcheon Argent a lion rampant Gules armed and langued Argent on a chief wavy Gules two wings conjoined expanded fesswise Argent. Supporters Two lions Gules armed and winged Argent gorged with collars Argent charged with maple leaves Gules. Compartment On a rock growing therefrom pitcher plant flowers and tufts of grass proper rising above barry wavy Argent and Azure. Motto Che Sara Sara
