= St. John's Jr. 50's =

- City: St. John's, Newfoundland and Labrador, Canada
- League: St. John's Junior Hockey League
- Operated: December 12, 1979-1993
- Home arena: Prince of Wales Arena
- Colours: Blue, yellow, and white
- General manager: John Martin, Doug O'Leary
- Head coach: Bas Whelan, John Fitzgerald, Don Quinn

Franchise history
- 1979-1980: St. John's Jr. Blue Caps
- 1980-1982: St. John's Guards
- 1982-1993: St. John's Jr. 50's

The St. John's Jr. 50's were a Canadian Junior ice hockey club from St. John's, Newfoundland and Labrador. They were members of the St. John's Junior Hockey League, the first ever 3-time Don Johnson Cup Atlantic Junior B Champions and one-time Newfoundland Junior A Champions.

== History ==
In 1980, the St. John's Junior Hockey League was formed. Prior to 1980, there was a junior town-league that was not of a very high caliber. The SJJHL became one of the stronger Atlantic junior leagues in the 1980s, with the 50's leading the way by becoming the first 3-time Atlantic Junior B Champion.

In the old city league, the team was known as the St. John's Jr. Blue Caps, but gained a sponsorship from Labatt Breweries in 1980. In 1979-80, the Jr. Blue Caps lost only once and were winners of the Veitch Memorial Trophy as provincial champions.

In the summer of 1980, new St. John's League President Danny Williams would not allow them to adopt a beer sponsored name, so they were known as the St. John's Guards after the Guards Athletic Association until 1982 when they became the Jr. 50's.

In their second season as the Jr. 50's, the 50's lost the final to the St. John's Jr. Shamrocks, but met them again in the Veitch Memorial Trophy final for the right to move on to the Don Johnson Cup and beat them 6-5.

By their third season, the 50's had won their first league title, their second Veitch Memorial Trophy in a round robin against the St. John's Jr. Shamrocks, and then their first Don Johnson Cup by defeating the Northumberland Junior B Hockey League's Antigonish Bulldogs in the final.

In 1987, two seasons later, the 50's won their second league title, again won the Veitch Memorial Trophy as Newfoundland Junior Champions, and then the Windsor Valley Jets 9-5 in the Don Johnson Cup final to clinch their second Atlantic Championship.

In 1988, they made it a third league title and Atlantic Championship to cap off a memorable run.

In 1989, the St. John's Junior Hockey League was promoted to Junior A. In the process, the league shrunk from eight to an elite four team league. The 50's survived this process. The 50's won the 1991 SJJHL title to become Newfoundland Junior A champions. As they moved on into National Playdowns, they competed against the Metro Valley Junior Hockey League's Halifax Canadians for the J. Pius Callaghan Cup Atlantic Junior A Championship. The Canadians swept the 50's in four games to end their Centennial Cup run.

The summer of 1991 saw the SJJHL return to Junior B. The 50's won league titles in 1992 and 1993. In the summer of 1993, the 50's ceased operations and were replaced by the St. John's Jr. Caps.

== Season-by-season record ==
Season	GP	W	L	T	OTL	GF	GA	P	Results	Playoffs
1979-80	Statistics Missing									Won VMT
1980-81	32	17	10	5	-	144	135	39	1st SJJHL	
1981-82	32	6	25	1	-	91	272	13	5th SJJHL	DNQ
1982-83	32	22	7	3	-	228	136	47	2nd SJJHL	Lost semi-final
1983-84	40	27	10	3	-	303	151	57	2nd SJJHL	Lost final, won VMT
1984-85	35	28	3	4	-	289	117	60	1st SJJHL	Won League, won VMT, won DJC
1985-86	28	20	4	4	-	187	138	44	2nd SJJHL	
1986-87	30	25	5	0	-	221	120	50	1st SJJHL	Won League, won VMT, won DJC
1987-88	32	26	5	1	-	302	130	53	1st SJJHL	Won League, won DJC
1988-89	42	19	22	1	-	245	224	39	6th SJJHL	
1989-90	36	30	4	2	-	277	152	62	1st SJJHL	
1990-91	34	21	12	1	-	212	156	43	1st SJJHL	Won League
1991-92	27	22	3	2	-	188	82	46	1st SJJHL	Won League
1992-93	39	32	7	0	-	286	148	64	1st SJJHL	Won League

Preceded by Antigonish Bulldogs	Don Johnson Cup Champions; 1985	Succeeded by Mount Pearl Jr. Blades
Preceded by Mount Pearl Jr. Blades	Don Johnson Cup Champions; 1987 and 1988	Succeeded by Sydney Millionaires
