= Quidi Vidi Lake =

Lake in Newfoundland and Labrador, Canada

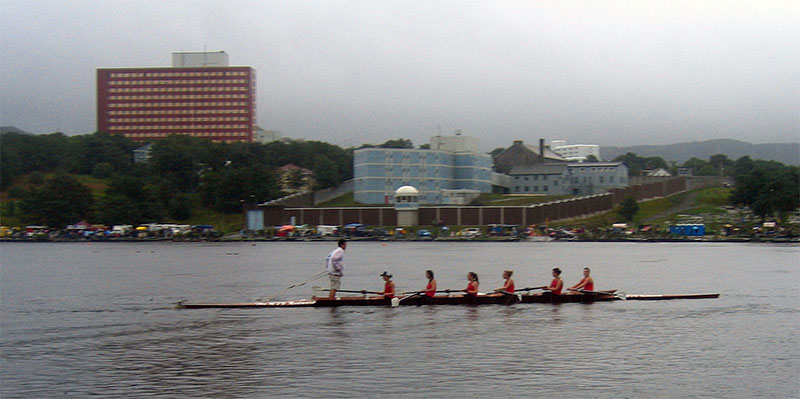
- Rowers at the Royal St. John's Regatta

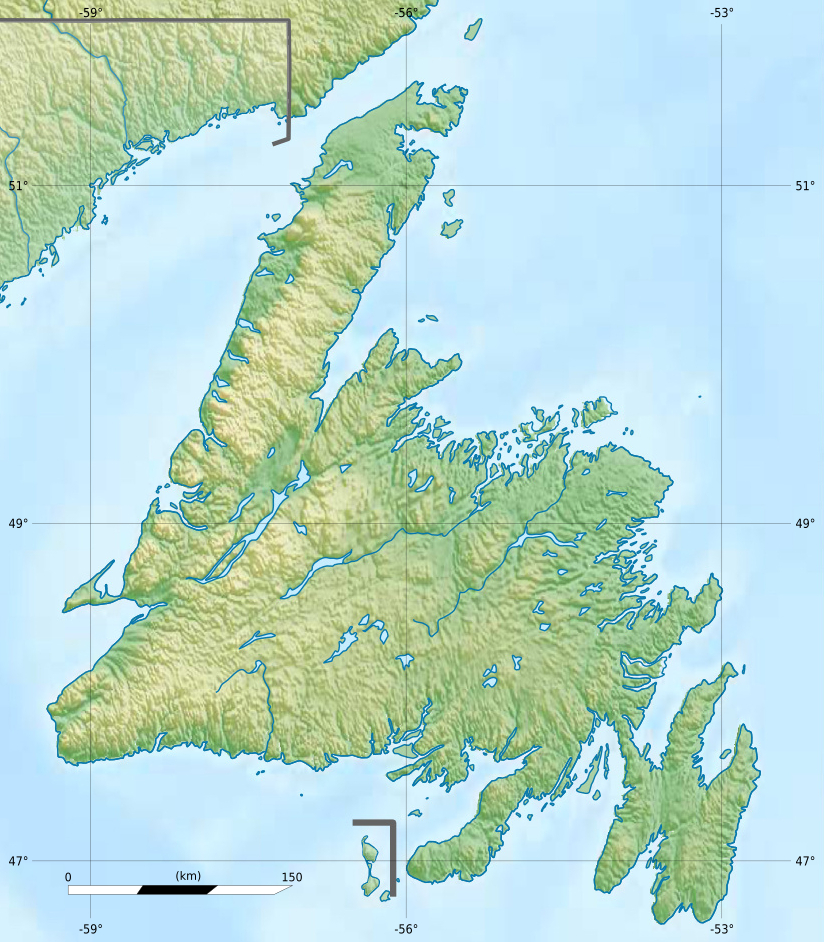
- Location within Newfoundland
- Location: St. John's, Newfoundland, Canada
- Coordinates: 47°34′51″N 52°41′20″W
- Primary inflows: Rennie's River; Virginia River
- Basin countries: Canada
- Settlements: St. John's

Quidi Vidi Lake is a 1,600 m (1 mi) long body of water located at the east end of the city of St. John's, Newfoundland, Canada. Local people commonly pronounce its name as kiddy viddy.

== Overview ==
Water flows into the lake from the Rennies and Virginia Rivers, along with smaller streams, and then into the sea through Quidi Vidi harbour. The lake has a long history of hosting sporting events, including the annual Royal St. John's Regatta, said to be the oldest continuous sporting event still held in North America. The former Pepperrell Air Force Base was located on the north shore of the lake and a military presence continues in the form of Canadian Forces Station St. John's (CFS St. John's)). The South shore of the Lake has a number of residential and apartment complexes. A number of cultural events are held at Lakeside.

Quidi Vidi Lake has a 3.8-kilometre (2.4 mi) leg of St. John's Grand Concourse walking trail surrounding it. On the north end of the walking trail is a fenced-in outdoor dog park and a skate board park. The Lake-to-Lookout Walk connects Quidi Vidi Lake with Ladies Lookout on Signal Hill.
