= Saint Pierre and Miquelon Hockey Association =

French ice hockey governing body

Saint Pierre and Miquelon Hockey Association, LHSPM
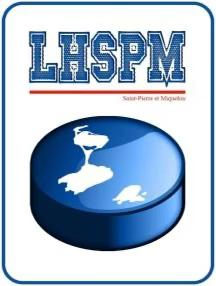
- Sport: Ice hockey
- Jurisdiction: Saint Pierre and Miquelon
- Abbreviation: LHSPM
- Founded: 2006
- President: Fabrice Guerin

Official website
- www.lhspm.com
- (France)
- (Saint Pierre and Miquelon)

Saint Pierre and Miquelon Hockey Association (in French: Ligue de Hockey sur glace de Saint-Pierre-et-Miquelon, LHSPM) is the governing body of all amateur hockey ice hockey in Saint Pierre and Miquelon, France. The Saint Pierre and Miquelon Hockey Association is a branch of the French Ice Hockey Federation (FFHG).

The Saint Pierre and Miquelon Hockey Association is recognised as the regional ice hockey league by the French Ice Hockey Federation (FFHG). It acts as a local relay for the national sports policy, adapting and implementing the Federation's directives throughout the region. The association has an agreement with the Collectivité Territoriale de Saint-Pierre-et-Miquelon, which provides the ice rink (700 seats, 6 changing rooms, administrative premises, etc.) for the organisation of its activities and competitions.

It has been chaired by Fabrice Guerin since 2022.

It is also responsible for organising the local senior ice hockey championship, in partnership with the Federation and the local government (the Collectivité Territoriale).

== See also ==
- French Ice Hockey Federation
