= Bell Island Blues =

- City: Bell Island, Newfoundland and Labrador
- League: Avalon East Senior Hockey League
- Operated: 2008
- Home arena: Monsignor Bartlett Memorial Arena
- Colours: Blue, Red, and White
- General manager: David Brazil
- Head coach: Greg Smyth

The Bell Island Blues are a senior ice hockey team based in Bell Island, Newfoundland and Labrador, Canada. They are currently in their 4th season as part of the Avalon East Senior Hockey League.

== History ==
In their first season in the St. John's Junior Hockey League in 1996, the team finished third and went on to win the following two seasons.

The team was renamed the CBR Renegades the 2007-2008 season.

The Blues were known as the Bell Island Wave prior to the 2010–11 season.

== 2011–2012 roster ==
| Pos. | No. | Player | Hometown |
|---|---|---|---|
| F | 6 | Humby, Corey | |
| D | 9 | Sullivan, Chad | |
| F | 10 | Rowsell, David | |
| F | 14 | Hutchings, Kyle | |
| F | 17 | Hammond, Craig | |
| F | 20 | Hickey, Mitch | |
| D | 91 | Quinlan, Sean | |
| F | 21 | Hull, Jon | |
| D | 8 | Bath, Todd | |
| F | 22 | Hammond, Chris | |
| D | 24 | Sweeney, Bernie | |
| D | 3 | Hurley, Josh | |
| F | 67 | Richards, Steve | |
| F | 87 | Coates, Andrew | |
| F | 13 | Roberts, Daniel | |
| F | 77 | Noftall, Daniel | |
| F | 15 | Durdle, Dion | |
| F | 4 | Crewe, Terry | |
| D | 8 | Eavis, Grant | |
| D | 7 | Burton, Mark | |
| G | 1 | Bursey, Greg | |
| G | 31 | Gear, Steven | |
| G | 30 | Phair, kelly | |

== See also ==
- List of ice hockey teams in Newfoundland and Labrador
