= Royal St. John's Regatta =

Annual rowing event in Newfoundland, Canada

- Abbreviation: RSJR
- Formation: 1816
- Type: Organizations based in Canada with royal patronage
- Legal status: active
- Headquarters: St. John's, Newfoundland, Canada
- Region served: St. John's, Newfoundland, Canada
- Official language: English
- Website: http://www.stjohnsregatta.ca/

The Royal St. John's Regatta is North America's oldest annual sporting event with documented proof of 1816 boat races. There is credible contention that St. John's regattas were held even earlier than 1816, likely in the 18th century. The races of 1818 were held on September 22 in order to coincide with the 57th anniversary of King George III's official coronation on September 22, 1761. It is from this date that the Regatta Committee takes its anniversary. In August 2018 the Royal St. John's Regatta celebrated its 200th anniversary.

Held on Quidi Vidi Lake in St. John's, Newfoundland, the Regatta is scheduled for the first Wednesday of August. If weather and wind conditions are not suitable, the event is postponed until the next suitable day. Since Regatta Day is a civic holiday in St. John's (replacing the Civic Holiday observed in most other Canadian provinces on the first Monday in August), this means that the weather actually determines whether or not workers have the day off – a matter sometimes complicated by late-night partying associated with the end of the George Street Festival the night before. This has led to the coining of the term "Regatta Roulette" where people head to George Street Festival or party elsewhere the night before and hope the weather is nice enough for the Regatta (and the holiday) the next day.

Crews row six-member, coxswained, fixed-seat racing shells that are as identical as possible and are the property of the Royal St. John's Regatta Committee. Men's crews row a 2.450 km course, women's row a 1.225 km course, and all crews are required to turn buoys and return to the start-finish line.

A growing number of people, local and foreign, visit Quidi Vidi Lake each year for the event, averaging around 50,000 in recent years. It has also become a popular spot for both provincial and federal politicians to meet the public. Aside from the rowing competitions, the Royal St. John's Regatta is well known for its lakeside entertainment. The Regatta host hundreds of booths operated by individuals and organizations, ranging from various games of chance to food and drink.

== History ==
There are records of rowing competitions in St. John's since at least 1816.

The regatta has long-standing ties with the Canadian monarchy: The regatta has been visited by members of the Royal Family, including Prince Albert Edward (later King Edward) in 1860 and Queen Elizabeth II in 1978. It has been cancelled due to the death of any monarch, and any year a coronation has taken place or a milestone jubilee celebrated, the regatta has been held in honour of the monarch. Its royal designation was incorporated in 1993, which prompted changes in the event and the development of a new crest. Don Johnson, Frederick Russell and Geoff Carnell collaborated in the effort to get permission to use the Royal prefix for the Regatta.

The first women's race in the St. John's Regatta was held in 1856. The winning crew of Quidi Vidi women was inducted into the Regatta Hall of Fame in recognition of their feat. It was nearly 100 years before women participated again. Beginning in 1949, women have rowed in nearly every Regatta, though a women's championship race was not introduced until 1979.

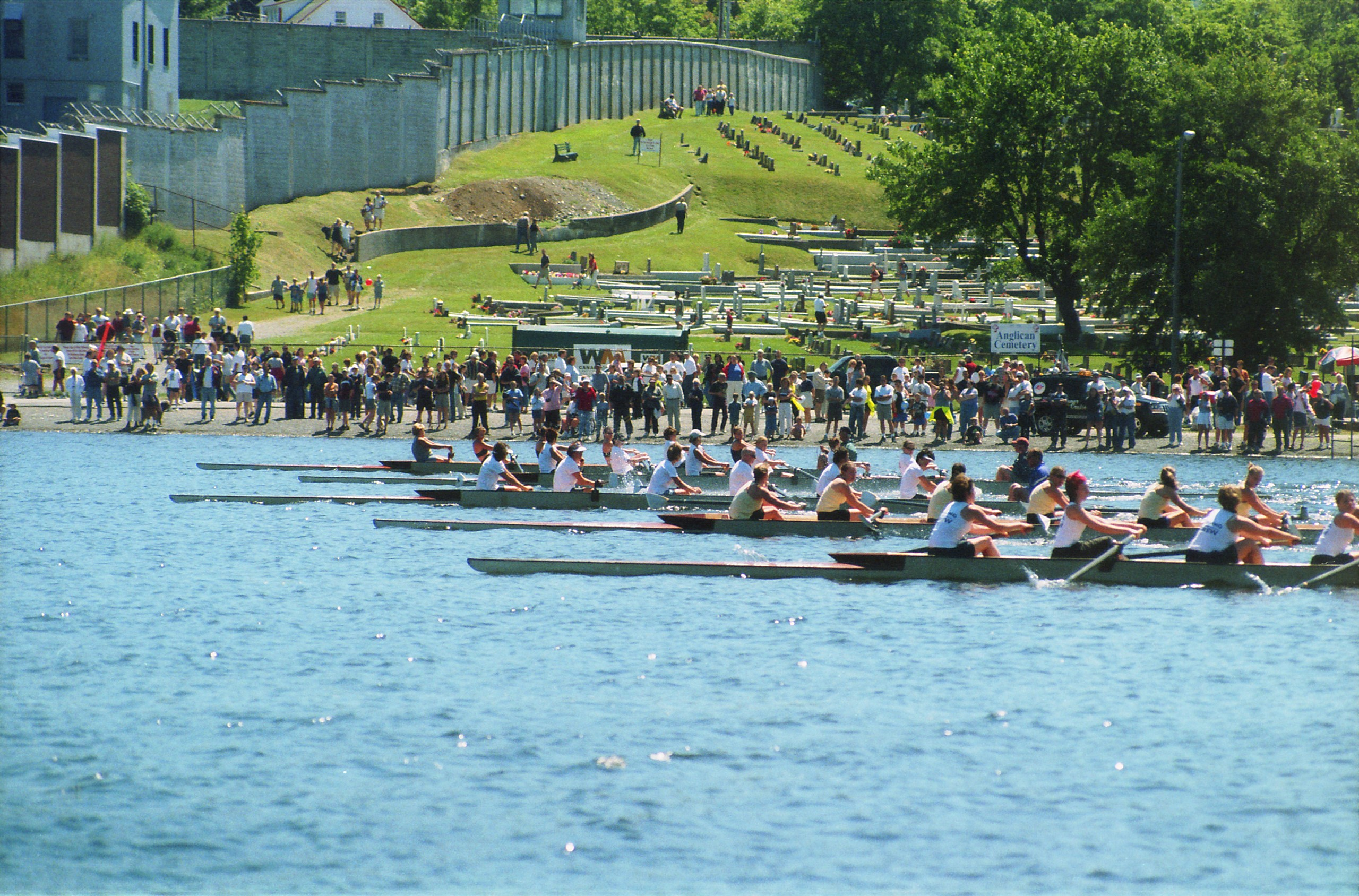
Regatta Start, St. John's, Newfoundland

== Course records and record holders ==
Male Course Record: 8:51.32 (Crosbie Industrial Services 2007 – Championship Race)

Members:

Cox: Mark Hayward

Stroke: Brent Hickey

5: Adam Kavanagh

4: Ronny Whitten

3: Ed Williams

2: James Cadigan

1: Darryl Ryan

Coach: Bert Hickey

Female Course Record: 4:56.10 (M5 2018 – Amateur Race)

Members:

Cox: Dean Hammond

Stroke: Katie Wadden

5: Alyssa Devereaux

4: Jane Brodie

3: Nancy Beaton

2: Amanda Ryan

1: Amanda Hancock

Spare: Maria Clift

== Course record progression ==
=== Male ===
Year	Crew	Time	Race	Coxswain	Stroke	5	4	3	2	1
1885	Outer Cove	9:20.00	Fisherman	Walter Power	James Hickey	Nix Power	Michael Hanlon	Mike Stack	Walter Power Jr.	William Power
1901	Outer Cove	9:13.80	Fisherman	Walter Power	John Whelan	Dan McCarthy	Denis McCarthy	Denis Croke	John Nugent	Martin Boland
1981	Smith Stockley	9:12.04	Club	Jim Ring	Randy Ring	John Barrington	Tom Power	Brian Cranford	Bill Holwell	Paul Ring
1982	Outer Cove	9:03.48	Amateur	Mike Power	Andrew Boland	Bert Hickey	Campbell Feehan	Gerard Ryan	Jim Hibbs	Owen Devereaux
1989	RNC / Lakeshore Homes	9:00.96	Amateur	Bill Hickey	Campbell Feehan	Gerard Ryan	Albert Gibbons	Brian Cranford	Bill Holwell	Jim Carroll
1991	Smith Stockley – Outer Cove	8:59.42	Amateur	Rich Bailey	Jim Hibbs	John Barrington	Ken Power	David Kelly	Paul Boland	Bert Hickey
1997	Butternut	8:57.10	Amateur	Mike Summers	Mike Jardine	John Handrigan	Chris Barton	Sean Budgell	Albert Gibbons	Perry Cahill
2007	Crosbie Industrial Services	8:54.06	Amateur	Mark Hayward	Brent Hickey	Adam Kavanagh	Ron Whitten	Ed Williams	James Cadigan	Darryl Ryan
2007	Crosbie Industrial Services	8:51.32	Championship	Mark Hayward	Brent Hickey	Adam Kavanagh	Ron Whitten	Ed Williams	James Cadigan	Darryl Ryan

=== Female ===
Year	Crew	Time	Race	Coxswain	Stroke	5	4	3	2	1
1981	Master Tire	5:15.57	Race #2	Rich Bailey	Michelle Rice	Deanne Kearney	Diane Roche	Anita O'Donnell	Margo Walsh	Paula Whitney
1989	OZFM	5:14.97	Amateur	Mike Summers	Siobhan Duff	Allison Carroll	Leona Rockwood	Jackie Gellately	Carol Perry	Patti Pittman
1990	OZFM	5:08.34	Championship	Mike Summers	Siobhan Duff	Jackie Gellately	Leona Rockwood	Nancy Little	Joanne Gellately	Patti Pittman
1994	OZFM	4:59.52	Championship	Les Hynes	Siobhan Duff	Kim Miller	Cheri Whelan	Tracy Hogan	Caroline Burry	Patti Pittman
2003	OZFM	4:56.70	Amateur	Rich Bailey	Siobhan Duff	Tracy Hogan	Kristine Power	Jackie Handrigan	Nicolle Hamlyn	Amanda Hancock
2018	m5	4:56.10	Amateur	Dean Hammond	Katie Wadden	Alyssa Devereaux	Jane Brodie	Nancy Beaton	Amanda Ryan	Amanda Hancock

== Official race record times ==
=== Female ===
Race category	Time	Year	Crew
Female Amateur	4:56.10	2018	M5
Female Mercantile	5:15.82	1997	North Atlantic Petroleum
Female Intermediate	5:11.15	2004	Compusult
Female Juvenile	5:25.66	2002	Noble Drilling
Female Midget	5:48.39	2001	Noble Drilling
Female Commercial	5:33.19	2001	Thrifty Car Rental
Female District	5:29.86	2001	CFS St. John's-Sports Shop
Female General Workers	5:30.56	2004	RJG Construction
Female All Comers	5:45.91	2001	Appleton Rum
Female Masters	5:12.53	2012	OZFMM
Female Memorial	5:31.49	2016	Port Authority
Female Club	5:44.23	2005	Bella Vista
Female Service	5:55.68	2011	Labrador Motors
Female Labour	5:46.39	2012	Statoil
Female Squirt	2:37.60	2016	FW Connolly Electrical

=== Male ===
Race category	Time	Year	Crew
Male Amateur	8:54.06	2007	Crosbie Industrial Services
Male Labour	9:22.99	1987	H.M. Penitentiary
Male Intermediate	9:23.27	2001	Academy Canada
Male Masters	9:40.11	2012	3M Masters
Male Midget	5:00.79	1995	East Coast Marine
Male Juvenile	9:43.07	1989	Outer Cove-East Coast Marine
Male All Comers	9:24.80	1995	Concrete Products
Male Service	9:03.64	1991	Smith Stockley-Outer Cove
Male General Workers	9:15.72	1981	Smith Stockley
Male Commercial	9:17.79	1991	RNC Sportscraft
Male Squirt	2:26.90	2016	Green Sleeves/Men’s Den

=== Championship ===
	Time	Year	Crew	Coxswain	Stroke	5	4	3	2	1
Female	4:57.78	2005	Compusult A/Canada Games	Ron Boland	Katie Wadden	Laura Rice	Rachel Coffey	Valerie Earle	Kate Parsons	Jenn Squires
Male	8:51.32	2007	Crosbie Industrial Services	Mark Hayward	Brent Hickey	Adam Kavanagh	Ron Whitten	Ed Williams	James Cadigan	Darryl Ryan

== Championship crews and times ==
=== Male ===
Year	Crew	Time
1873	Outer Cove	12:05.0
1874	Cancelled due to rain	
1875	All Comers	11:35.0
1876	Outer Cove	10:40.0
1877	Placentia	10:28.0
1878	All Comers	9:58.0
1879	Outer Cove	10:11.0
1880	Broad Cove	10:04.0
1881	Broad Cove	9:45.0
1882	Amateurs	9:21.0
1883	Outer Cove	9:45.0
1884	Outer Cove	10:13.0
1885	Outer Cove	9:20.0
1886	Outer Cove	9:35.0
1887	Outer Cove	9:40.0
1888	Tradesmen	10:08.0
1889	Outer Cove	9:52.0
1890	Torbay	9:30.0
1891	Torbay	9:42.0
1892	Cancelled due to fire	
1893	Outer Cove	9:56.0
1894	Outer Cove	10:27.0
1895	Torbay	9:45.0
1896	Juveniles	9:58.5
1897	Tradesmen	9:45.8
1898	Tradesmen	9:30.6
1899	S.O.E	10:00.8
1900	Torbay	9:29.0
1901	Outer Cove	9:13.8
1902	Outer Cove	9:22.0
1903	Job’s	9:56.3
1904	Blackhead	9:21.3
1905	Blackhead	9:40.3
1906	Blackhead	9:34.0
1907	Outer Cove	9:53.2
1908	Outer Cove	9:45.0
1909	Outer Cove	9:38.2
1910	Torbay	9:36.6
1911	Torbay	9:45.0
1912	L.O.A	9:54.0
1913	Torbay	10:51.0
1914	Logy Bay	9:46.0
1915	Cancelled due to war	
1916	Cancelled due to war	
1917	Cancelled due to war	
1918	Cancelled due to war	
1919	Logy Bay	9:32.2
1920	Truckmen	10:06.0
1921	Truckmen	9:55.4
1922	Outer Cove	9.40.0
1923	Outer Cove	9:47.0
1924	Truckmen	9:51.0
1925	Truckmen	9:44.2
1926	Outer Cove	9:41.0
1927	Amateurs	9:50.8
1928	Truckmen	9:55.2
1929	Labourers	9:42.0
1930	Labourers	9:45.6
1931	Fishermen	9:47.0
1932	St. Joseph’s	9:44.0
1933	Fishermen	10:14.6
1934	All Comers	9:29.0
1935	Police	9:47.0
1936	All Comers	10:12.0
1937	Police	9:41.0
1938	Police	9:37.2
1939	Police	9:36.8
1940	Cancelled due to war	
1941	Ex-Servicemen	10:20.0
1942	Canadian Navy	10:09.0
1943	Nfld. Regiment	10:07.8
1944	Labourers	9:46.6
1945	Labourers	10:00.2
1946	Police	9:55.2
1947	U.S. Army Docks	9:59.4
1948	Labourers	11:09.0
1949	Higher Levels (Intermediate)	10:45.0
1950	Higher Levels	11:11.4
1951	Amateurs	10:27.2
1952	Labourers	10:15.0
1953	Labourers	9:51.4
1954	U.S. Air Police	9:56.0
1955	U.S. Air Police	10:06.0
1956	Patricians	10:01.0
1957	St. Bon’s	10:10.0
1958	City Police	9:45.0
1959	William Summers Jr.	9:49.2
1960	William Summers Jr.	9:51.0
1961	William Summers Jr.	10:10.0
1962	William Summers Jr.	10:01.4
1963	William Summers Jr.	10:08.0
1964	William Summers Jr.	10:07.8
1965	Jerseyside	10:54.8
1966	Newfoundland Light & Power	10:03.0
1967	Warrens Texaco	10:12.2
1968	William Summers Jr.	10:27.0
1969	Newfoundland Light & Power	10:03.0
1970	Crosbie Services	9:50.0
1971	Newfoundland Light & Power	10:02.0
1972	Crosbie Services	10:06.0
1973	NAVFAC	9:51.0
1974	NF Light & Power and Hickman’s (Dead Heat)	10:10.0
1975	Hickman’s	10:02.8
1976	Placentia	9:56.8
1977	Placentia Lion’s	9:54.2
1978	Boys Club	9:52.0
1979	Smith-Stockley	10:01.3
1980	Boys Club	9:46.9
1981	Boys and Girls Club	9:23.2
1982	Outer Cove	9:12.3
1983	Outer Cove	9:05.3
1984	Outer Cove	9:21.2
1985	Smith-Stockley	9:06.2
1986	Smith-Stockley	9:19.3
1987	Smith Stockley	9:55.1
1988	RNC-Lakeshore Homes	9:29.3
1989	RNC-Lakeshore Homes	9:01.2
1990	RNC-Lakeshore Homes	9:10.0
1991	Smith Stockley-Outer Cove	8:59.4
1992	Smith Stockley-Outer Cove	9:04.5
1993	Outer Cove-Coldwell Banker	9:20.2
1994	Smith Stockley-Outer Cove	9:08.3
1995	Butternut Bread	9:01.1
1996	RNC-Grand Banks Alliance	9:22.6
1997	Butternut	9:11.1
1998	RNC-Discovery Springs	9:16.3
1999	NTV	9:15.7
2000	NTV	9:08.6
2001	NTV	9:08.4
2002	NTV	9:07.2
2003	NF Power	9:05.6
2004	NTV	9:12.7
2005	The Independent	9:04.0
2006	Crosbie Industrial	9:24.5
2007	Crosbie Industrial	8:51.3
2008	O’Dea Earle	9:22.2
2009	East Coast Maintenance Services	9:09.7
2010	Rogers Bussey Lawyers	9:32.8
2011	Rogers Bussey Lawyers	9:10.8
2012	Rogers Bussey Lawyers	9:16.6
2013	Toyota	9:23.4
2014	Bussey Howrood Lawyers	9:14.5
2015	Max Arts. Athletics Wellness	9:26.32
2016	Outer Cove	9:09.68
2017	Outer Cove	8:59.70
2018	Outer Cove	9:06.34
2019	Fine Strokes	9:04.71
2020	Cancelled due to COVID-19	
2021	NTV	9:36.99
2022	NTV	9:40.91
2023	Fine Strokes	9:15.71
2024	Capital Home Hardware	9:43.31
2025	Capital Home Hardware	9:55.24
2026	Fine Strokes	9.22.22

=== Female ===
Year	Team	Time
1979	Health Science	6:11.3
1980	General Hospital	5:50.0
1981	Dunne’s Fuel	5:36.3
1982	General Hospital	5:29.1
1983	Dunne’s Fuel	5:23.7
1984	Central Dairies	5:34.2
1985	Central Dairies	5:19.1
1986	Ryan’s Construction	5:24.8
1987	Ryan’s Construction	5:53.0
1988	OZ FM	5:20.3
1989	OZ FM	5:22.1
1990	OZ FM	5:08.3
1991	Trinity Bay Offshore	5:11.0
1992	VOCM-Hibernia	5:17.8
1993	OZ FM-Mark’s Work Warehouse	5:11.7
1994	OZ FM	4:59.5
1995	Keyin Tech	5:02.0
1996	Keyin Tech	5:18.6
1997	Keyin Tech	5:10.3
1998	OZ FM	5:04.5
1999	Keyin College	5:03.6
2000	OZ FM	5:07.8
2001	Keyin College	5:11.4
2002	OZ FM	5:08.3
2003	OZ FM	4:58.7
2004	Jungle Jim’s	5:06.5
2005	Compusult A/Canada Games	4:57.8
2006	OZ FM	5:16.2
2007	O’Dea Earle	5:06.2
2008	H.J. O’Connell Construction	5:03.5
2009	JAC Marketing & Advertising / Canada Games	5:08.3
2010	m5	5:05.2
2011	m5	4:59.3
2012	Roebothan McKay Marshall	5:04.2
2013	Max Girls 1	5:12.4
2014	Max Athletics Women	5:11.8
2015	Roebothan McKay Marshall	5:18.44
2016	m5	5:10.16
2017	m5	5:00.71
2018	m5	4:56.10
2019	Hyflodraulic	5:02.23
2020	Cancelled due to COVID-19	
2021	Hyflodraulic	5:10.99
2022	Hyflodraulic	5:11.35
2023	Hyflodraulic	5:10.99
2024	Volkswagen	5:18.94
2025	Volkswagen	5:16.41
2026	Volkswagen	5:11.68

== Other events ==
Regatta Day is only officially recognized as a holiday in the city of St. John's and most retail establishments outside the city remain open that day. Some larger suburban stores mark the day with extravagant Boxing Day-style sales.

== See also ==
- List of Canadian organizations with royal patronage
- St. John's, Newfoundland and Labrador
- Monarchy of Canada
