= Northeast Jr. Eagles =

Northeast Eagles
- City: Torbay, Newfoundland and Labrador, Canada
- League: St. John's Junior Hockey League
- Division: City Division
- Founded: 1980
- Home arena: Chicken Coop
- Colours: Black, yellow and white
- General manager: Doug Tibbo
- Head coach: Greg Ryerson (2017-2018)

Franchise history
- 1980–2014: St. John's Jr. Celtics
- 2013–2016: Northeast Celtics
- 2016–current: Northeast Eagles

The Northeast Jr. Eagles are a Canadian Junior ice hockey club from St. John's, Newfoundland and Labrador. They are members of the St. John's Junior Hockey League, are a former Junior A team, and were the first ever Don Johnson Cup Maritime Junior B champions in 1982.

== History ==
Prior to 1980, junior hockey in St. John's was for the most part a juvenile-level recreation league. Every year, an all-star team was drafted from the city and named the St. John's Jr. Capitals, after their senior team the St. John's Capitals, to compete against teams from across the province for the Veitch Memorial Trophy at either the Junior A or B level.

In 1980, the St. John's Junior Hockey League was organized and a legitimate Junior B league was formed. The winner of this league, not an all-star team, would represent the city in provincial and inter-provincial events. One of the founding members of this league was the St. John's "Brothers Rice" Jr. Celtics. In 1982, the Celtics would win their first league championship. They would win the Veitch Memorial Trophy and move on to the first ever Don Johnson Cup—an inter-provincial Junior Championship featuring the best Junior B clubs from New Brunswick, Prince Edward Island, Nova Scotia, and Newfoundland and Labrador. In the final game, the Jr. Celtics defeated PEI's Kensington Bombers, 4–3, to win the first ever championship. Newfoundland's own Don Johnson had the honour of awarding the trophy bearing his name to his own son, Celtics' Michael Johnson, at the first event.

Nine games into the 1982–83 season, the Celtics had to pull out of the league. They were mothballed in 1983–84, but returned after that year off.

In 1989, the league retracted by half and was promoted to Junior A to compete for the Manitoba Centennial Cup at a National level. The Celtics were a part of this Junior A experiment for its two seasons, but the winners of the two seasons (St. John's Jr. 50's and Avalon Jr. Capitals) did not fare well in national playdowns, and the entire league returned to Junior B in 1991.

The Jr. Celtics won the St. John's League championship in 1982, 1994, 1995, 2000, 2001, 2008, and 2011. They won the Provincial Veitch Memorial Trophy in 1982, 1995, 2001, 2003, 2008, and 2011. 1982 remains the Celtics' only Don Johnson Cup.

In May 2016 all levels of hockey playing in the Jack Bryne Arena were re-branded as the Northeast Eagles.

== Season-by-season record ==
Season	GP	W	L	T	OTL	GF	GA	P	Results	Playoffs
1980–81	32	15	11	6	–	164	145	36	3rd SJJHL	
1981–82	32	25	4	3	-	250	104	53	1st SJJHL	Won league, won VMT, won DJC
1982–83	9	2	6	1	-	36	65	5	5th SJJHL	Suspended
1983–84	Did not participate									
1984–85	33	3	28	2	-	73	256	8	7th SJJHL	
1985–86	28	4	23	1	-	112	280	9	7th SJJHL	
1986–87	30	8	20	2	-	150	226	18	6th SJJHL	
1987–88	31	6	23	2	-	177	274	14	5th SJJHL	
1988–89	42	31	11	0	-	335	214	62	1st SJJHL	
1989–90	36	16	15	5	-	213	193	37	2nd SJJHL	
1990–91	33	11	22	0	-	178	206	22	4th SJJHL	
1991–92	27	9	15	3	-	129	159	21	3rd SJJHL	
1992–93	38	15	23	0	-	192	214	30	3rd SJJHL	
1993–94	24	19	5	0	-	191	98	38	1st SJJHL	Won league
1994–95	34	24	9	1	-	218	135	49	1st SJJHL	Won league, won VMT
1995–96	32	22	7	3	-	232	155	47	1st SJJHL	
1996–97	32	17	12	3	-	155	143	37	2nd SJJHL	
1997–98	34	18	16	0	-	187	187	36	2nd SJJHL	
1998–99	33	20	11	2	-	176	140	42	3rd SJJHL	
1999-00	37	29	5	3	-	199	125	61	1st SJJHL	Won League
2000–01	31	17	8	3	3	163	124	40	4th SJJHL	Won League, won VMT
2001–02	32	22	8	2	-	155	105	46	1st SJJHL	
2002–03	29	10	18	0	1	130	144	21	6th SJJHL	Won VMT
2003–04	29	10	16	1	2	146	166	23	7th SJJHL	
2004–05	28	4	22	1	1	124	184	10	8th SJJHL	
2005–06	29	13	12	1	3	171	167	30	5th SJJHL	
2006–07	29	16	11	2	0	146	149	34	4th SJJHL	
2007–08	28	16	10	1	1	130	102	34	3rd SJJHL	Won League, won VMT
2008–09	28	17	9	1	1	146	124	36	3rd SJJHL	
2009–10	28	21	5	2	0	163	93	44	2nd SJJHL	
2010–11	28	17	10	-	1	144	102	35	4th SJJHL	Won League, won VMT
2011–12	28	12	14	-	2	121	127	26	5th SJJHL	
2012–13	28	15	12	-	1	123	137	31	3rd SJJHL	Lost semi-final
2013–14	28	8	18	-	2	103	134	18	7th SJJHL	Lost quarter-final, 1–4 (Caps)
Northeast Celtics
2014–15	28	11	16	-	1	87	104	23	7th SJJHL	Lost quarter-final, 2–3 (Renegades)
2015–16	28	7	20	-	1	82	152	15	7th SJJHL	Lost quarter-final, 0–3 (Blades)
Northeast Eagles
2016–17	28	3	21	-	4	75	152	11	8th of 8 SJJHL	Lost quarter-final, 1-3 (Breakers)
2017–18	27	4	21	-	2	88	162	10	8th of 8 SJJHL	Lost quarter-final, 0-3 (Blades)
2018–19	28	10	14	0	4	102	134	24	6th of 8 SJJHL	Lost quarter-final, 0-3 (Jr. Stars)
2021–22	21	0	21	0	0	33	135	0	8th of 8 SJJHL	Did not qualify
2022–23	28	10	14	0	4	93	127	24	6th of 8 SJJHL	Lost quarterfinals, 0-3 (Jr. Caps)
2023–24	28	18	9	1	0	93	127	37	3rd of 8 SJJHL	Won quarterfinals, 3-0 (Jr. Warriors); Lost Semifinals, 1-4 (Jr. Caps)
2024–25	28	7	18	3	0	82	120	17	7th of 8 SJJHL	Lost quarterfinals, 0-3 (Jr. Stars)
2025–26	28	12	15	3	1	91	120	25	5th of 8 SJJHL	Lost quarterfinals, 0-3 (Jr. Warriors)

Preceded by –	Don Johnson Cup Champions; 1982	Succeeded by Antigonish Bulldogs
