= Northeast Sr. Eagles =

Tappers Northeast Senior Eagles
- City: Torbay, Newfoundland and Labrador
- League: East Coast Senior Hockey League
- Operated: 2008
- Home arena: Jack Byrne Arena
- Colours: Black, Gold, and White
- General manager: Joe Maynard
- Head coach: Darryl Banfield
- Asst. coach: Keith Maynard

The Northeast Senior Eagles are a senior ice hockey team based in Torbay, Newfoundland and Labrador as part of the New East Coast Senior Hockey League. They have been a member of the Avalon East Senior Hockey league since its inception in 1967. They currently play out of the Jack Byrne Arena in Torbay, Newfoundland. Their home games are Friday nights at 8:00pm.

== History ==
=== 2015–16 ===
The 2015–16 version of the Northeast Eagles looked a little different to the one that lost to the Southern Shore in game 7 to end the 2015 season. The Eagles lost 14 players following last season. Their biggest losses were the league's leading scorer and third-leading scorer as both Reid brothers, Kevin and Mason, headed to join the Clarenville Caribous of the Provincial Senior League. The addition of the Conception Bay Ceebees saw the Eagles lose netminder Bronson Dawe, forward Dan Sparkes, and the rights to Tommy Snow and rearguard Fred Earle. Kory Waterman was traded to the Bell Island Blues in exchange for a 3rd pick in the first draft this season. Also not returning were Brock Hopkins, Mitch Flynn, Matthew Horan, Matthew Oates, Matthew Power, Brad Sheppard, and Brad Yetman. Yetman would join assistant Darryl Banfield as the new head coach of the Eagles.

The Eagles made a trade with the Bell Island Blues for the 3rd overall pick in the October draft and used it to select former Ceebee Chris Sparkes. Sparkes made a living in the goalmouth as a member of the Ceebees and most recently the Grand Falls Cataracts, and will be expected to help fill the void of Mason Reid. Local defensive stalwart Jeremy Kavanagh had left the Clarenville Caribous to join the Eagles. Kavanagh is a former Herder champ with the Bous and is known to be a defensive defenseman in Newfoundland. Former St. Mary's grad and Halifax Moosehead Andrew White had also decided to leave the Gander Flyers of the provincial league to join the Eagles. Also returning to the Avalon East league is former St. John's Maple leaf and Belleville Bull, Mark Chaplin. Chaplin a veteran leader in senior hockey has won several herders. Former St. John's Fog Devil Chris Thorne is also returning to the Eagles after a one-year hiatus. Former Clarenville Caribou Mitch Bragg was also obtained via a trade with the Bell Island Blues.Tyler Walshe will also be back this year after moving to Alberta for a year. Replacing goaltender Bronson Dawe is former Jr. Celtic Billy Dawe. Also graduating from Jr. are defenseman Matt Walsh and forward Chris Blackwood. Walsh logged heavy minutes for the Jr. Celtics, and Blackwood scored 28 goals in the 2013–14 season. Also returning after a two-year break is defenseman Cory Sturge and forward Shawn Roberts. Sean Wadden joined the Eagles after Christmas after leaving the Gander Flyers. Goalie Matthew Power also rejoined the Eagles after Christmas after taking last year off.

Chris Sparkes was the league's top scorer, netting 22 goals and adding 26 assists for 48 points.

The Eagles swept the Bell Island Blues in round one of the playoffs, surrendering 8 goals in the four-game sweep.

The St. John's Caps won their 4th crown in five years with a 4–2 game 7 victory in front of a standing room-only crowd at the Jack Byrne Arena. Kyle Downer was again the difference as he picked up his 4th playoff MVP trophy in the Caps run to the cup. The St. John's Caps, for the first time in 10 years, now represent the AESHL as they take on the CWSHL winner the Grand Falls Cataracts in a best-of-five affair for the Herder Memorial Trophy.

=== 2014–15 ===
After losing to the St. John's Capitals for the third straight year, head coach Darryl Banfield made some acquisitions at the AESHL draft in hopes of bringing an East League title to Torbay. New Faces to the 2014 squad are Kevin Reid, Chris Mooney, Daniel Sparkes, Mark Yetman, Brad Yetman, Mitch Flynn, Mike Halitzki, Kory Waterman, Jason Picco, Lee Newhook, and Fred Earle.

The Eagles have finalized their roster with many returning players, creating a new lineup for the season.

Goaltending upgrades include Mark Yetman, and Bronson Dawe. At the defense core, Dan Cadigan, Brad Yetman, and Mitch Flynn joined as well-known and respected players. Notable offensive additions include Chris Mooney, Mike Halitzki, who is returning after a one-year hiatus, and Jason Picco. Jason Picco joins the team due to a following trade with Bell Island.

Not returning to the Eagles this season are Tyler Parsons, Tyler Walshe, Jordan Mcentegart, Matthew Roche, Chris Thorne, Graham Jackman, and Evan Greene.

The Eagles finished the season in 2nd place in the Avalon East Hockey League standings with a 13–7–1 record. Mason Reid was the AESHL's leading scorer with 19g, 26a for 45 pts. He walked away this season with the Kevin Butt Memorial Award as the League's MVP. His line mate Chris Mooney was second in scoring with 43 pts, and led the league with 21 goals. Mooney was the recipient of the Frank Martin Memorial Award for the league's Most Gentlemanly and Effective player. Reid's brother Kevin finished 3rd in league scoring with 36 pts and took home the Peter Picco Memorial Award for Rookie of the Year. The trio was no doubt the league's top line giving goalies nightmares all year. Daniel Cadigan led all AESHL defenseman with 19 pts and was again awarded the Wade Duggan Memorial Award as the League's Top Defenceman.

The Eagles swept the three-time defending champion St. John's Capitals in the first round of the playoffs, only surrendering 6 goals in the 3 games.

The Eagles were bested by the Southern Shore Breakers in a seven-game final. It's the fourth year in a row that the Eagles came up short in the AESHL finals.

=== 2013–2014 ===
The 2013–14 team finished the regular season in the Avalon East League with a record of 18–2. After sweeping the Southern Shore Breakers in round one in 4 games, they were defeated by the now three-time defending champs, the St. John's Capitals, in a six-game series.

Dan Cadigan led the league in scoring with 41 points. Rookie Tyler Parsons was runner-up to Cadigan with 32 points, and goaltender Bronson Dawe went undefeated in the regular season.

Pos.	No.	Player	Hometown
D	2	Jeremy Kavanagh	Logy Bay
D	3	Doug O'brien	Logy Bay
D	4	Jason Picco	St. John's
D	5	Matt Walsh	Torbay
D	6	Dan Cadigan	Logy Bay
D	7	Andrew Smith	Corner Brook
D	9	Jimmy Parsons	Torbay
F	10	James Cadigan	Logy Bay
F	11	Chris Thorne	Normans Cove
F	14	Tyler Walshe	Torbay
D	15	Chris Ryan	Port Saunders
F	16	Chris Blackwood	Bauline
F	18	Andrew Temple	Normans Cove
F	19	Chris Mooney	Outer Cove
F	21	Andrew White	St. John's
F	22	Liam Myers	Chapel's Cove
F	23	Mark Chaplin	St. John's
F	27	Shawn Roberts	Torbay
D	28	Scott Marshall	Logy Bay
G	30	TJ Daley	Torbay
G	31	Billy Dawe	Torbay
D	37	Adam Kavanagh	Flatrock
F	43	Chris Sparkes	St. John's
G	63	Mark Yetman	Mt. Pearl
F	71	Danny Connolly	St. John's
F	83	Sean Wadden	St. John's
Coach	—	Darryl Banfield.	Logy Bay
Asst. Coach	—	Keith Maynard	Flatrock
Asst. Coach	—	Brian Clarke	Torbay
Trainer	—	Dudley March	Paradise
Asst. Trainer	—	Laura March	Paradise

== Seasons and records ==
=== Season-by-season results ===
Note: GP = Games played, W = Wins, L = Losses, T = Ties, OTL = Overtime Losses, Pts = Points, GF = Goals for, GA = Goals against, DNQ = Did not qualify

AESHL = Avalon East Senior Hockey League, NSHL = Newfoundland Senior Hockey League

Northeast Eagles regular season and postseason statistics and results, 2003–present
Season	League	Regular season									Postseason					
Season	League	GP	W	L	T	OTL	GF	GA	PTS	Finish	GP	W	L	GF	GA	Result
2008–09	AESHL															
2009–10	AESHL															
2010–11	AESHL															
2011–12	AESHL	20	8	10	0	2	82	101	18	3rd						2nd
2012–13	AESHL	18	14	4	0	0	102	66	28	1st						2nd
2013–14	AESHL	20	18	2	0	0	125	61	36	1st	9	5	4			2nd
2014–15	AESHL	21	13	7	0	1	107	67	27	2nd	10	6	4			2nd
2015–16	AESHL	23	20	3	0	0	123	56	40	1st	11	7	4	47	37	2nd
2016–17	AESHL	23	12	8	0	3	83	75	27	2nd	13	6	7	—	—	2nd

== See also ==
- Avalon East League Standings
- Avalon East League Statistics
- Avalon East League Schedule
- List of ice hockey teams in Newfoundland and Labrador
