= Hockey Nunavut =

Canadian ice hockey governing body

- Sport: Ice Hockey
- Founded: 1999
- Location: Nunavut, Canada
- (Canada)
- (Nunavut)

Hockey Nunavut is the governing body for ice hockey in Nunavut, Canada. It operates under Hockey North, a branch of Hockey Canada.

== Arctic Winter Games ==
Nunavut participates in both the male and female hockey categories in the Arctic Winter Games.

Typically, Hockey Nunavut send two male teams (bantam and midget) and one female team (junior). For the 2016 Arctic Winter Games in Nuuk, Greenland, only bantam male hockey and junior female hockey will take place. Due to a lack of facilities in Nuuk, these events will be hosted by the city of Iqaluit, Nunavut in March 2016.

== Nunavut Challenge Cup Champions ==
Junior teams in Nunavut play off for the Nunavut Challenge Cup. The winners earn the right to represent Nunavut in the Maritime-Hockey North Junior C Championship.

Funding from Hockey Nunavut ended for the tournament in 2018.

Year	Champions	Runner-up	Result (best-of 3)
2003	Team Kivalliq		
2004	Team Kivalliq		
2005	Team Kivalliq		
2006	Team Kivalliq		
2007	Kivalliq Canucks		
2008	Kivalliq Canucks		
2009	Qikiqtani Elks	Kivalliq Canucks	
2010	Kivalliq Canucks		
2011	Kivalliq Canucks	Qikiqtani Elks	2-0
2012	Kivalliq Canucks	Qikiqtani Sharks	2-1
2013	Kivalliq Canucks	---	---
2014	Kivalliq Canucks		
2015	Baffin Blizzard	Kivalliq Canucks	
2016	Kivalliq Canucks	Baffin Blizzard	2-1
2017	Baffin Blizzard	Kivalliq Canucks	
2018	Baffin Blizzard	Kivalliq Canucks	2-1
2019	Kivalliq Canucks		
2020			

=== Maritime-Hockey North Championship ===
Kivalliq Canucks were the first-ever Hockey North team to reach the MHNJC final in 2012. After dropping their first two round robin games the Canucks defeated the Hampton Hurricanes and Tignish Aces to earn a spot in the semifinals. With a 3-1 victory over Pownal Red Devils the team advanced to the gold medal game where they came up short losing to Chester Clippers 7-3.

In 2015 the Baffin Blizzard became the first Hockey North team to capture the championship. Baffin went 2-2-0 in the round robin before defeating Western Valley Panthers 3-1 in the semifinal. The Blizzard went on to defeat South Side Lynx in the championship game 6-5.

== Notable alumni ==
Jordin Tootoo - Former NHL player with the Chicago Blackhawks, Nashville Predators, Detroit Red Wings, and the New Jersey Devils.
