= Hockey Canada Officiating Program =

The Hockey Canada Officiating Program (sometimes abbreviated HCOP or less commonly CHOP) is the governing body for on-ice officials for all ice hockey games played under the jurisdiction of Hockey Canada. The Hockey Canada Rulebook provides in-depth explanation and examples of all rules governing hockey in Canada.

The Hockey Canada Officiating Program guides the development and utilization of Officials through all levels of hockey governed by Hockey Canada. The 5-tier level system, is the foundation for the training and development of amateur hockey officials across Canada. Designations of Levels I through III allow the officiating of most minor hockey. Designation of Levels Member High Performance and National High Performance allow the officiating of international, semi-professional, and professional levels of hockey.

Hockey Canada has categorized the hockey into four basic streams, each with different priorities. They include:

- Initiation
- Recreational
- Competitive
- Program of Excellence

== Penalties ==
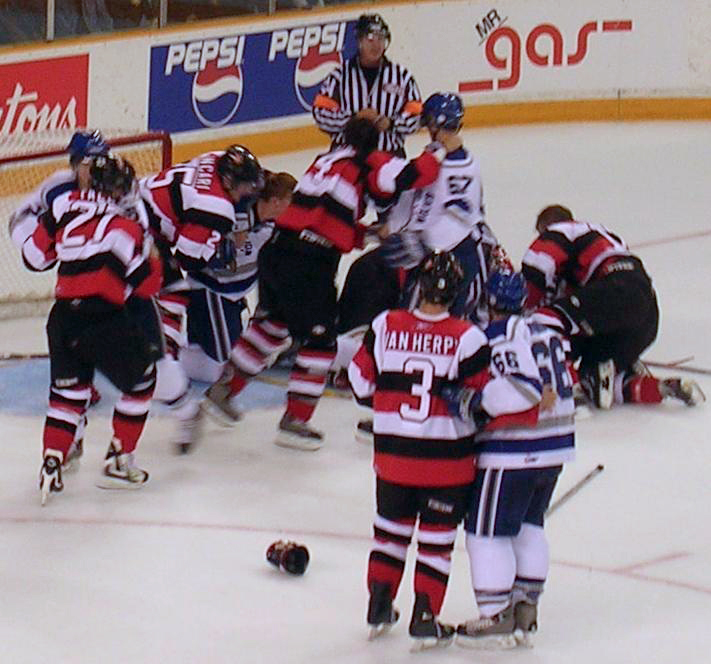
Altercations often occur near the goal after a stoppage of play, since defensive players are extremely concerned with protecting their goaltender. All rulebooks call for penalties if an offensive player interferes with a goaltender's ability to defend the goal.

A penalty in ice hockey is a punishment for inappropriate behavior. Most penalties are enforced by detaining the offending player within a penalty box for a set number of minutes during which the player can not participate in play. The offending team usually may not replace the player on the ice, leaving them short-handed (as opposed to full strength) or penalty killing until the penalty expires and the player returns to the ice. The opposing team is said to be on a power play, having one player more on the ice than the short-handed team. While standards vary somewhat between leagues, most leagues recognize several common degrees of penalty, as well as common infractions. The statistic used to track penalties was traditionally called Penalty Infraction Minutes (PIM), although the alternate term Penalties in Minutes has become common in recent years.

The referee(s) make most penalty calls. Linesmen generally may call only certain obvious technical infractions such as "too many players on the ice". When a penalty is called, the official will put an arm in the air; the official will stop play only once the offending team has control of the puck, or play is stopped by normal means. A delayed penalty is one in which the a penalty is called but play is not yet stopped because the opposing team retains the puck. The goaltender of the non-offending team will often go to the players' bench upon seeing the arm signal to allow an extra attacker on the ice until the play is stopped.

=== List of infractions ===
Under most jurisdictions of hockey, you will see these penalties being called in almost every aspect of the game.

Abuse of officials
Arguing with, insulting, using obscene gestures or language directed at or in reference to, or deliberately making violent contact with any on or off-ice official. This generally is issued in addition to other penalties or as a bench penalty against a coach or off-ice player, and is grounds for ejection under a game misconduct or match penalty in most leagues including the NHL.
Aggressor penalty
Assessed to the player involved in a fight who was the more aggressive during the fight. This is independent of the instigator penalty, but both are usually not assessed to the same player (in that case the player's penalty for fighting is usually escalated to deliberate injury of opponents, which carries a match penalty).
Attempt to injure
Deliberately trying to harm an opponent (and/or succeeding). This type of infraction carries an automatic match penalty.
Boarding
Pushing an opponent violently into the boards.
Butt-ending (or Stabbing)
Jabbing an opponent with the end of the shaft of the stick. Double minor or major and game misconduct.
Butt-ending (Hooking)
Holding or hooking an opponent with the end of the shaft above the hand. Minor penalty for Butt-End hooking.
Charging
Taking more than three strides or jumping before hitting an opponent.
Checking from behind
In hockey governed by Hockey Canada, checking an opponent from behind carries an automatic Game Misconduct in addition to any other time penalty the player receives. If the victim of the check is unable to defend themselves, an automatic Match penalty is assessed.
Cross-checking
Hitting an opponent with the stick when it is held with two hands and no part of the stick is on the ice.
Delay of game
Deliberately stalling the game (for example, deliberately shooting the puck out of play, holding the puck in the hand, refusing to send players out for a faceoff, or even repeated deliberate offsides). As part of the rule changes following the 2004–05 NHL lockout, NHL officials also call an automatic delay of game penalty to goaltenders that go into the corners behind the goal line (outside a trapezoid-shaped area just behind the net) to play the puck. Some delay of game offenses, such as taking too long to send players to take a faceoff, are not punished with a penalty: instead, the official may choose to eject the center of the offending team from the face-off circle and order him replaced with another player already on the ice.
Elbowing
Hitting an opponent with the elbow.
Fighting (Fisticuffs)
Engaging in a physical altercation with an opposing player, usually involving the throwing of punches with gloves removed or worse. Minor altercations such as simple pushing and shoving, and punching with gloves still in place, are generally called as Roughing.
Goaltender Interference
Physically impeding or checking the goalie. Visually impeding the goalie's view of the play with your body, called "screening", is legal.
Head-butting
Hitting an opponent with the head. Based on force, minimal impact is a minor, severe impact is major and game misconduct. Intent to injury is Match.

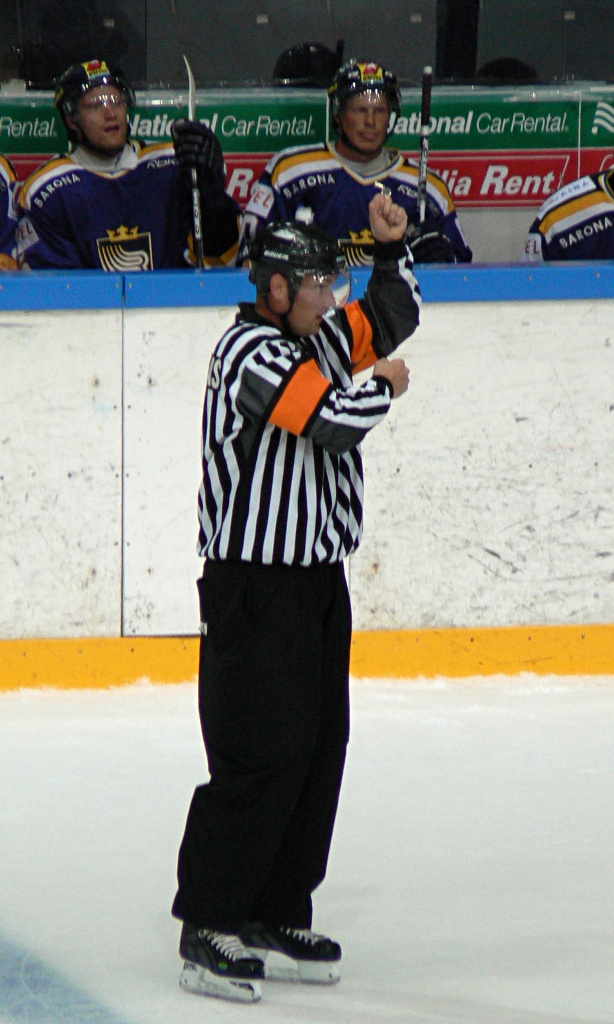
A referee signals a penalty for high sticking

High sticking
Touching an opponent with the stick above shoulder level. A minor penalty is assessed to the player. If blood is drawn(NHL), a double-minor (4 minutes) is usually called. They may also assess a double-minor when blood is not drawn(Jr. Hockey), but he believes that the player was sufficiently injured(Injured = major and game misconduct) or that the offending player used excessively reckless action with his stick. If a player, while in the action of "following through" on a shot, strikes an opposing player in the head or face area with his stick, high sticking is still called (new 2008-2010 season). A penalty is not called when the puck is hit by a high stick, but play will be stopped and the ensuing faceoff will take place at a spot which gives the non-offending team an advantage. Also, a goal that is scored by means of hitting the puck with a high stick will not be counted.
Holding
Grabbing an opponent's body, equipment or clothing with the hands or stick. Generally a minor, Hockey Canada rules call for a major and a game misconduct for grabbing and holding a facemask or visor to inflict punishment on opposing player.
Holding the stick
Grabbing and holding an opponent's stick, also called when a player deliberately wrenches a stick from the hands of an opposing player or forces the opponent to drop it by any means that is not any other penalty such as Slashing.
Hooking
Using a stick to prevent an opponent from making a play with the puck
Illegal Equipment
Using equipment that does not meet regulations, either by size (length, width) or number (two sticks) or other guidelines (e.g. a goalie's facemask can no longer be the "Jason"-style form-fit mask, a player may not play with a goalie's stick). If a player broke a stick, it is mandatory to drop the stick immediately and play without it until getting a replacement from the bench. Otherwise this penalty(misconduct) will be assessed to the offending player (some game summaries call this "playing with a broken stick"). Goalkeepers may not go to the bench but must have a stick carried out to them). This rule is generally not enforced in amateur leagues except for broken sticks or egregiously out-of-spec equipment as the cost of acquiring gear that do not meet specifications is prohibitive, especially for goalies. However, from 2009 onwards USA Hockey and Hockey Canada will enforce the NHL goal equipment specs, as will IIHF. While allowing "big pads" until then, USA Hockey stated in their 2007 Official Rules and Casebook of Ice Hockey that they "strongly encourage" goaltenders to follow the new regulations before they take effect.
Instigator penalty
Being the obvious instigator in a fight. Called in addition to the five-minute major for fighting.
Interference
Impeding an opponent who does not have the puck, or impeding any player from the bench.
Joining a fight
Also called the "3rd man in" rule, the first person who was not part of a fight when it broke out but participates in said fight once it has started for any reason (even to pull the players apart) is charged with an automatic game misconduct in addition to any other penalties they receive.
Kicking
Kicking an opponent with the skate or skate blade. Kicking carries a match penalty.
Kneeing
Hitting an opponent with the knee.
Playing with Too Many Sticks
When a player plays with more than one stick. For example, if a goalie were to lose his stick and a player from his team skates over to pick up the goalie stick and then, while skating back to the goalie with both sticks, attempts to touch a live puck with either stick, will be called for Playing with Too Many Sticks.
Roughing
Pushing and shoving or throwing punches that are not severe enough to be considered fighting. Also called in non-checking leagues when an illegal body check is made.
Secondary Altercation
This infraction is not listed in the NHL Rulebook, but it is prevalent in Hockey Canada and other minor leagues. It is most commonly issued when players engage in or attempt to engage in fight after the original fight (between two separate players). This infraction carries an automatic game misconduct penalty.
Slashing
Swinging a stick at an opponent, no contact is required under new standards.
Spearing
Stabbing an opponent with the stick blade carriers a double minor penalty. If the spear results in injury, an automatic major penalty and game misconduct is given.
Starting the wrong lineup
This very rare bench minor penalty is called when the offending team fails to put the starting lineup on the ice at the beginning of each period, the exception being injuries. For this penalty to be called, the captain of the non-offending team must bring this breach of the rules to the referee's attention immediately at the first stoppage of play. Also the penalty may be given if a player is not put on the scoresheet at the beginning of the game and plays. The only way for this to be called is if the official scorer notifies the referee of this oversight.
Substitution infraction (Illegal Substitution)
This rare bench minor penalty is called when a substitution or addition is attempted during a stoppage of play after the linesmen have signalled no more substitutions (once the face-off is set) or if a team pulls its goalie and then attempts to have the goalie re-enter play at any time other than during a stoppage of play. Too many men on the ice and/or starting the wrong lineup can also simply be called a substitution infraction.
Too many men on the ice
Having more than six players (including the goalie) on the ice involved in the play at any given time. "Involved in the play" is key; players that are entering the ice as substitutes for players coming off may enter the ice once the player returning to the bench is less than five (5) feet from his team's bench (Rule 74.1); at that point the returning player is considered out of the play, even if the play passes in front of the bench, unless he actively makes a move for the puck. Players entering the ice are part of the play as soon as their skates touch the ice.
Tripping
Using a stick or one's body to trip an opponent.
Unsportsmanlike conduct
Arguing with a referee; using slurs against an opponent or teammate; playing with illegal equipment; making obscene gestures or abusing an official. Can carry either a minor, misconduct, game misconduct or match penalty, depending on the gravity of the infraction (for instance, using obscene language to a referee initially results in a minor, but making an obscene gesture to an opponent, fan or official carries a game misconduct.) Also, in some leagues the penalty progression is different for players and team officials (for example, in the USA Hockey rulebook players get a minor for their first infraction, a misconduct for their second and a game misconduct for their third, whereas the option of a misconduct is removed for coaches; in addition, after each penalty for a team official, the penalty count resets itself). Unsportsmanlike conduct may also be called if a player drops gloves and stick in preparation for a fight, but the non-offending player does not drop the corresponding equipment and has committed no action (verbal or physical harassment) to attempt to instigate a fight. As of April 14, 2008, following a Devils-Rangers playoff game, the NHL ruled that standing in front of an opposing goalie and engaging "in actions such as waving his arms or stick in front of the goaltender's face, for the purpose of improperly interfering with and/or distracting the goaltender" will draw a minor unsportsmanlike conduct penalty, a rule interpretation inspired by the play of Sean Avery against Martin Brodeur.

Other leagues typically assess penalties for additional infractions. For example, most adult social leagues and women's hockey leagues ban all body checking (a penalty for roughing or illegal check is called), and in most amateur leagues, including Hockey Canada, any head contact whatsoever results in a penalty (Checking to the Head).

== History ==
=== On Ice Officiating Systems ===
- The three official system uses one referee and two linesmen. This is the most common officiating system. The NHL previously used this system until changing to the four-official system.
- The Four Official System adds a second referee for a total of two referees and two linesmen. This system is used in the NHL and other high-levels such as Major Junior hockey. In 2007-2008, college hockey used the system in some games on a trial basis.
- In the two-official system, each official acts as both referee and linesman—each has the responsibility to call both penalties and blue line violations. In this system, neither official wears red or orange armbands. This is used at lower levels of youth hockey and in most adult recreational leagues.
- In the 2-1 system (also known as the modified three-man), there are two referees and one linesman. There are a variety of ways to divide the responsibilities between the referees and linesmen. Typically, the back referee is responsible to make the initial call at the blue line when the puck first enters the zone, and after that the linesman takes over.
- The 1-1 system (sometimes called Texas two-man) uses one referee and one linesman. Often, this is an informal system used when one of the officials does not show up for a game scheduled to use the three-official system, or an official is hurt during a game. The referee in this system must also make the occasional line call.
- The one-man system used in non-competitive leagues. The referee makes all calls, though with less accuracy than in other systems

== Annual Certification ==
All On-Ice Officials in Canada are required to register for a clinic and pass an exam in order to be eligible to officiate Hockey in Canada. Clinics can be found and registered for on the Hockey Canada Clinic website. This is required for all levels of Officials.

== Level System ==
=== Level I ===
- Simply register for a Level I clinic to get started.
- To prepare a young or new official to officiate minor hockey
- An individual is certified at Level I with attendance and completion of a Level I clinic – eight (8) hours of instruction, minimum
- Completion of a national exam must be marked and returned prior to the completion of the clinic
- Minimum age to participate in the Level I clinic is chosen by the hockey branch

=== Level II ===
- To further enhance the training and skills of the minor hockey official.
- Must be a minimum of 16 years old in urban regions, and 15 years old in rural regions as of December 31 of the current season
- Must attend all sessions of the Level II clinic, a minimum eight (8) hours in duration, and obtain a minimum of 70% on a written national exam to be marked and returned prior to the completion of the clinic
- Must pass a practical, on-ice evaluation, performed by a qualified Branch Hockey Canada Officiating Program supervisor.

=== Level III ===
- To prepare officials capable of refereeing Minor Hockey playoffs, minor hockey Regional Playoffs and Female National Championship or being linesmen in Junior B, Senior, Bantam or Midget Regional Championships
- Must be fully certified at Level II and referee at least one year at that level in order to register for Level III
- Must attend and participate in all sessions at a Level III clinic, a minimum of eight hours of instruction, and must obtain a minimum of 80% on a written national examination, to be marked and returned prior to the completion of the clinic
- Must pass a practical, on-ice evaluation, performed by a qualified Branch Hockey Canada Officiating Program supervisor
- Must be judged capable of refereeing in Minor Hockey Playoffs

=== Level IV ===
- To prepare hockey officials capable of refereeing Senior, Junior A, B, Minor Hockey Regional and National Championships, Female Hockey National Championships and designated Minor Hockey IIHF competition or being a linesman in Major Junior, Junior A, Senior, CIAU, CCAA, Inter-Branch and IIHF competitions
- Must be fully certified at Level III and referee one year at that level
- Must attend a Level IV Branch clinic, attendance is by invitation only
- Must attend and participate in all sessions of the Level IV clinic (minimum 14 hours), obtain a minimum of 80% on a written national exam
- Must pass a practical, on-ice evaluation, performed by a qualified Branch Hockey Canada Officiating Program supervisor

=== Level V ===
- To prepare competent officials to referee Major Junior, Junior A, Senior, CIAU, CCAA, Inter Branch playoffs, Minor Hockey Regional or National Championships
- Must be fully certified at Level IV and referee one year at that level
- Must attend the Branch Level V seminar, a minimum of 14 hours of instruction, attendance is by invitation only
- Must participate in all sessions obtaining a mark of 90% on a written national exam
- Must be on ice evaluated by the BC Hockey Referee in Chief to complete certification
- Must undergo fitness and skating tests

=== Level VI ===
- To prepare competent officials capable of officiating at National championship finals and designated IIHF competition – these competitions include the Memorial Cup, RBC Royal Bank Cup, Allan Cup, World Championships, Olympics and others
- Branch nominations are submitted to the Hockey Canada National office and are reviewed by an established selection committee
- Must be fully certified at Level V (including fitness tests) and referee one year at that level
- Must attend and participate in all sessions of a Level VI clinic, minimum of four (4) days of instruction, and obtain a minimum of 90% on a written national examination
- Must pass a practical on-ice evaluation, performed by a national supervisor
- Must complete a written assignment assigned by the Hockey Canada Referee in Chief
- Delivery Level VI clinics are held based on national need for Level VIs. The Hockey Canada Manager, Officiating is responsible for the organization of the site and program, establishing criteria and review of the candidates qualifications
- Attempts are made to stage the clinic in conjunction with a major training program or early in the season, requesting cooperation from local leagues so officials are able to work scrimmages or games

== Affiliated Organizations ==
The Hockey Canada Officiating Program has many regional branches across the county, which are associated with Hockey Canada:

- British Columbia Amateur Hockey Association
- Hockey Alberta
- Hockey Manitoba
- Hockey New Brunswick
- Hockey Northwestern Ontario
- Hockey Nova Scotia
- Hockey Québec
- Hockey Newfoundland and Labrador
- Hockey North
- Ontario Hockey Federation
- Ottawa District Hockey Association
- Hockey PEI
- Hockey Saskatchewan

HCOP also sanctions the officials of these governing bodies at the Major Junior and Junior "A" levels:

- Canadian Hockey League
  - Western Hockey League
  - Quebec Major Junior Hockey League
  - Ontario Hockey League
- Canadian Junior Hockey League
  - British Columbia Hockey League
  - Alberta Junior Hockey League
  - Saskatchewan Junior Hockey League
  - Manitoba Junior Hockey League
  - Superior International Junior Hockey League
  - Northern Ontario Junior Hockey League
  - Ontario Junior Hockey League
  - Central Junior Hockey League
  - Ligue de Hockey Junior AAA du Quebec
  - Maritime Junior A Hockey League

== See also ==
Hockey Canada
