= New Brunswick Junior C Hockey League =

Junior ice hockey league

The New Brunswick Junior C Hockey League was a Junior ice hockey league in New Brunswick, Canada, sanctioned by Hockey Canada. The winner of the playoffs competed in the Maritime-Hockey North Junior C Championships.

== History ==
Dating back to the late 1960s, the NBJHL was an elite Maritime league. The league would operate for almost 15 years before ultimately folding in 1983. With this, its successor, the NBJBHL, would replace the NBJHL and operate until 2003.

Left with a void of no formal junior hockey league within the province, the NBJHL was formed in 2003. This would become the primary Jr. league in New Brunswick, a Jr. C league.

While operating exclusively as a Junior C league, starting in 2007, the League was allowed to send its top team to the Don Johnson Cup as a Jr. B representative. In 2009, the league failed to send their champion. In the same year, a group of teams fled the NBJHL to form their own Jr. B league, the New Brunswick Junior B Hockey League, leaving the NBJHL with 6 teams and as a Jr. C League.

In the Summer of 2011, all but Hampton folded. With this, the league ceased operations, and the Hurricanes moved up to Junior B thus ending the tenure of the NBJHL.

== The teams ==
Team	Centre
Dieppe/Memramcook Voyageurs	Dieppe
Hampton Hurricanes	Hampton
Richibucto Bears	Richibucto
Shediac/Cap-Pele Predators	Shediac

== Champions ==
2011 Kent Centre Jr. Bears
2010 Shediac/Cap-Pele Predators
2009 Hampton Hurricanes
2008 Jr. B Dieppe-Memramcook Voyageurs - Jr. C Shediac/Cap-Pele Predators
2007 Dieppe-Memramcook Voyageurs
2006 Shediac/Cap-Pele Predators
2005 Kent-Sud Flames
2004 Dieppe-Memramcook Avalanche

== See also ==
- List of ice hockey teams in New Brunswick
