= Official (ice hockey) =

Ice hockey official

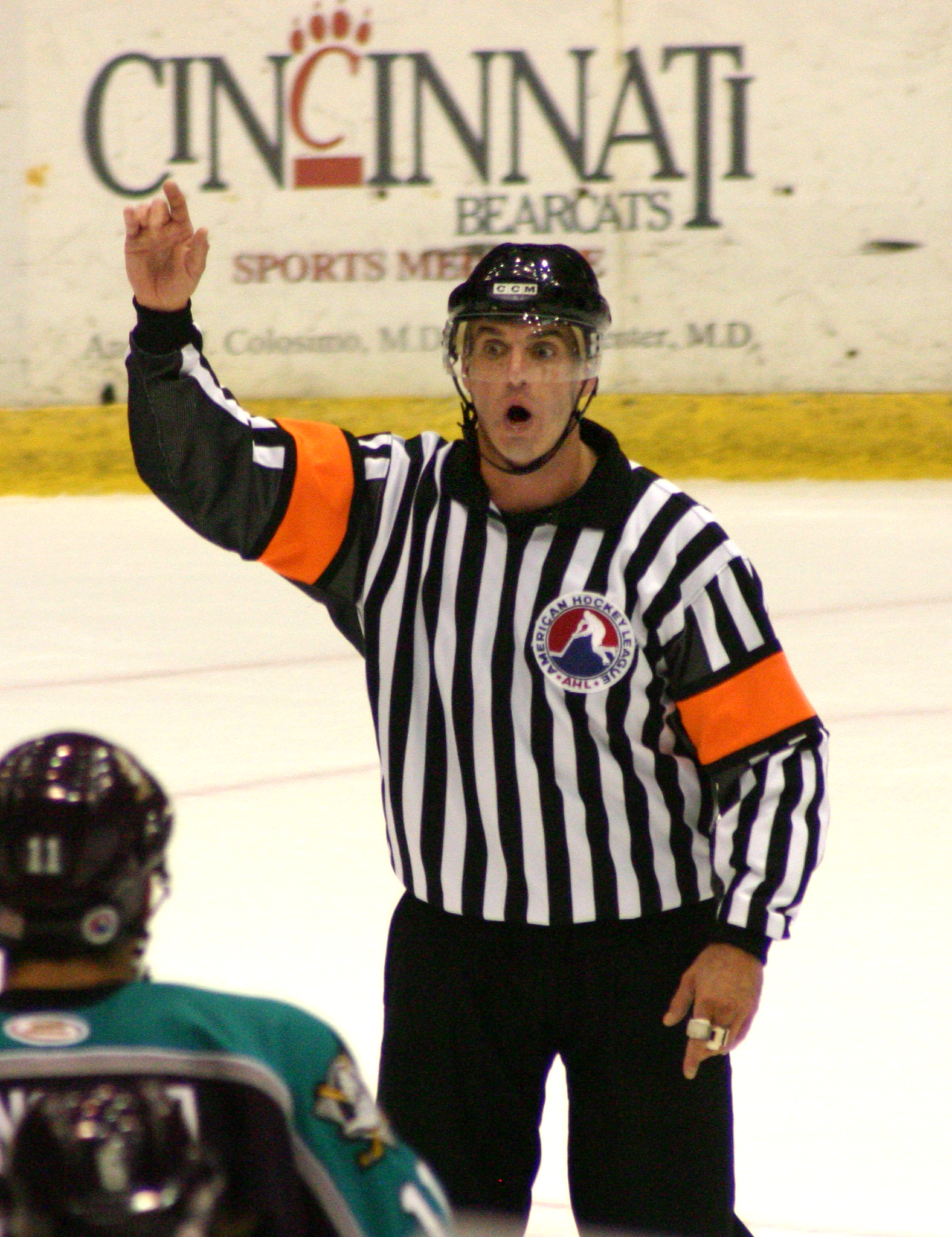
American Hockey League (former NHL) referee Dean Morton

In ice hockey, an official is a person who has some responsibility for enforcing the rules and maintaining the order of the game. There are two categories of officials, on-ice officials, who are the referees and linesmen who enforce the rules during gameplay, and off-ice officials, who have an administrative role rather than an enforcement role.

== On-ice officials ==
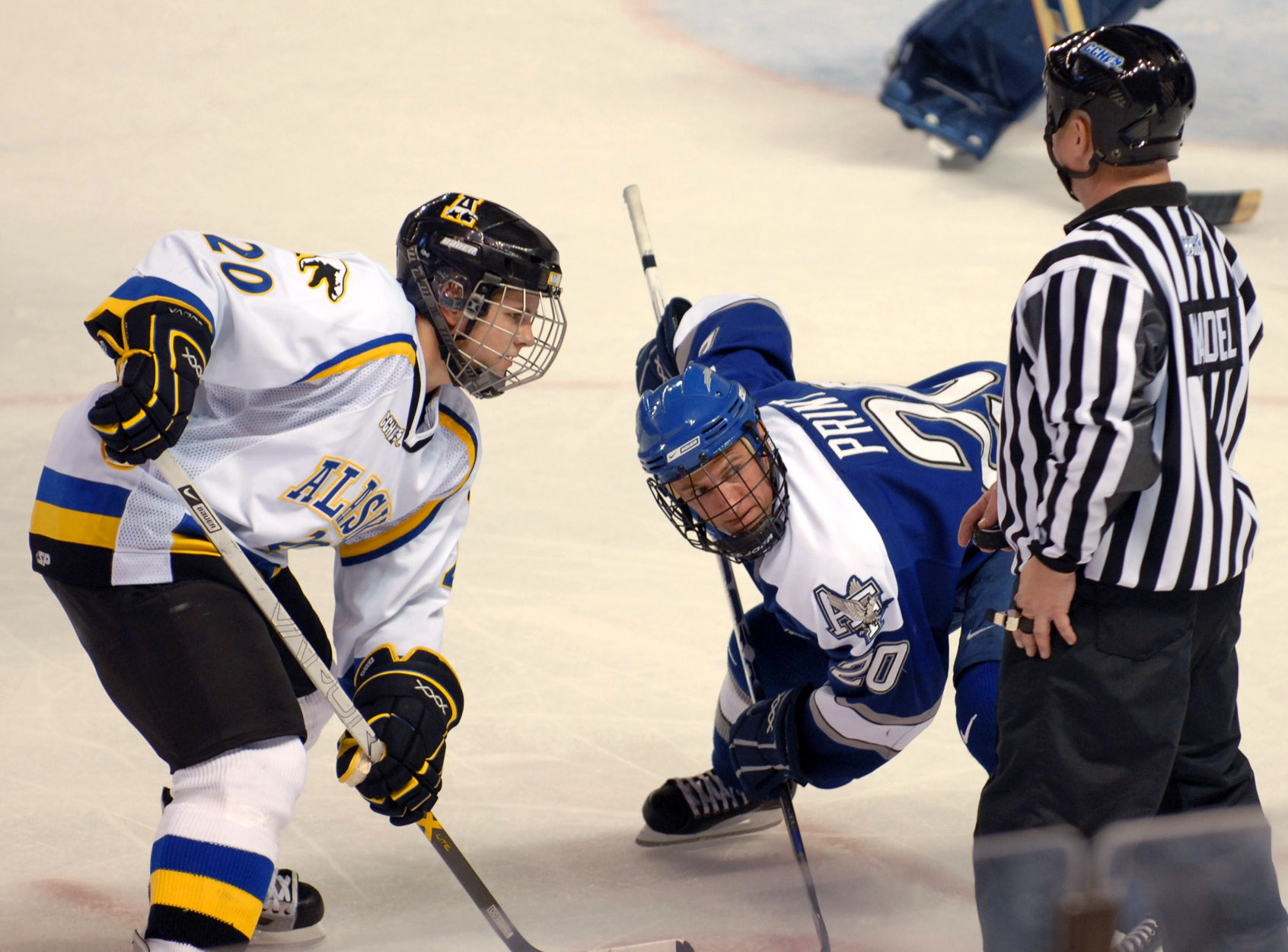
An official about to drop the puck during a faceoff.

As the name implies, on-ice officials do their job on the hockey rink. They are traditionally clad in a black hockey helmet, black trousers, and a black-and-white vertically striped shirt. They wear standard hockey skates and carry a finger whistle, which they use to stop play. They communicate with players, coaches, and off-ice officials, both verbally and via hand signals. Starting in 1955 with the introduction of the black-and-white jersey, NHL on-ice officials wore numbers on their back for identification. In 1977, NHL officials removed the number and had only their surnames on the back of their jerseys for identification, normally in a single row across the shoulders. (Some officials with long names would have their name in two rows, the most notable example being Andy Van Hellemond.) However, in 1994, NHL officials returned to wearing solely numbers on their shirts, a procedure adopted by other sports leagues.

In the early days of hockey when the NHL was formed (1917), the referees would carry a bell, not a whistle, to stop the game in progress.

Later, NHL referees wore cream-colored sweaters over a shirt and tie, from the 1930s to the early 1950s. They then briefly wore orange sweaters with half-zip fronts (and without neckties), until the black-and-white-striped jersey was introduced in 1955.

=== Referees ===
A referee (top-right) intently watches a shot-on-goal unfold during a game between the Pittsburgh Penguins and the Washington Capitals.

A referee is responsible for the general supervision of the game and can be identified by the orange (NHL and USA Hockey), purple (PWHL), or red (Hockey Canada) armbands on their arms. Ice hockey is a fast-paced sport with high-velocity shots of a puck that is only three inches in diameter; therefore referees aim to position themselves so they have specific unobstructed views of plays in order to make crucial judgment calls as accurately as possible.

Under most officiating systems, the referee is the only official with the authority to assess penalties for violations of the rules. When a penalty is being assessed the referee will stand near center ice and announce the penalty to the entire arena. However, the linesmen can report a variety of penalties, such as too many players on the ice and major penalties, to the referee, who may then assess the penalty. Depending on the rule book/level of play, a referee may conduct the opening face-off in each period and face-offs that follow after a goal is scored, which are done at the center ice face-off dot. If a goal is challenged, the referee or referees are the ones who review the play.

=== Linesmen ===
Linesmen or linespersons are primarily responsible for watching for violations involving the center line and the blue line. Such infractions include icing and offside, after which the linesmen conduct faceoffs. They are also expected to break up scuffles, fistfights and other altercations that occur during the game. Linesmen do call some penalties (such as too many players on the ice), and can report major penalties to the referee who may choose to call them.

==== Assistant referees ====
In some leagues, the linesmen are given the title of assistant referee. When given this title, they are given more responsibility to stop play and to call penalties that the referee may not see. The NCAA previously used this designation prior to altering its officiating systems in 2006.

=== On-ice officiating systems ===
- The three-official system uses one referee and two linesmen. The NHL previously used this system until changing to the four-official system in the late 1990s. The highest level for this system is the ECHL, which does official development for the NHL. However, the ECHL is shifting away from this system, with the playoffs and many regular season games using the four-official system.

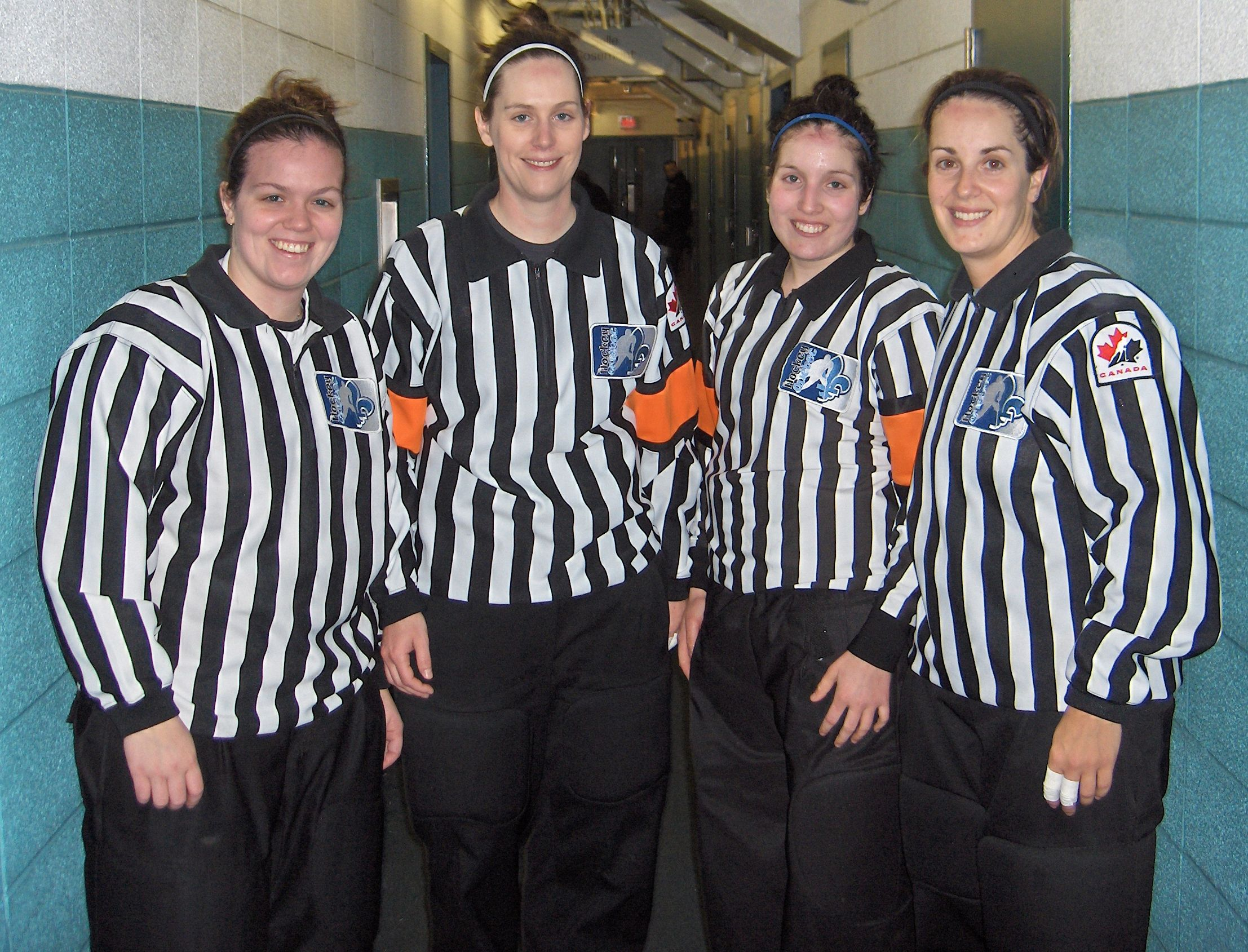
These officials are working in a four-official system; the two middle officials are the referees, identifiable by their orange armbands

- The four-official system adds a second referee for a total of two referees and two linesmen. In this system, each referee works either the lead/front or the trail/back position. The lead position is normally in the corner of the end zone, while the trail position is in the neutral zone, diagonally opposite the lead referee. As the game transitions from one end of the ice to the other, the lead becomes the trail and vice versa. The four-official system is used in the NHL, AHL, and at other high levels, such as major junior, junior 'A', and top European leagues. In 2007-2008, college hockey used the system in some games on a trial basis. The International Ice Hockey Federation (IIHF) first implemented this system for men's games at the 2008 IIHF World Championship and for women's games at the 2014–15 IIHF European Women's Champions Cup; the four-official system has subsequently been the standard in IIHF competition. The NCAA voted in July 2012 to make the four-official system mandatory for men's games starting in the 2013-14 season. All NCAA games now use the four official system.
- In the two-official system, each official acts as both referee and linesman. Each official has the responsibility to call both penalties and line violations. In this system, neither official wears red or orange armbands or both will wear one armband each. This is used at lower levels of youth hockey and in most adult recreational leagues.
- In the 2-1 system, also called the modified three-man, there are two referees and one linesman. There are a variety of ways to divide the responsibilities between the referees and linesman. For example, on icing plays the linesman will initiate the call and the lead referee will make the determination of whether icing is completed. The 2-1 system is mostly used in American college club hockey (often ACHA) and NFHS-certified high school hockey.
- The 1-1 system (sometimes called Texas two-man) uses one referee and one linesman. This is usually seen in adult recreational leagues (sometimes called "beer league" - C, D and I divisions) as a cost-saving measure; the pace of play at this level is typically slow enough for the two officials to cover events between them. This can also be an informal system used ad hoc when one of the officials does not show up for a game scheduled to use the three-official system, or when an official is hurt during a game. The referee in this system also has the duties of a linesman.
- Beginner-level adult leagues sometimes will only use a single on-ice official who is responsible for calling line violations and penalties. The official will not usually wear orange or red armbands in this system.

== Off-ice officials ==
Off-ice officials, formerly referred to as 'Minor Officials' with the exception of the video goal judge in professional leagues, do not have any direct impact on the outcome of the game. They serve primarily in administrative and advisory roles.

=== Goal judge ===
The goal judge determines whether a player has scored a goal by watching to see if the puck has crossed the goal line completely. They act only in an advisory role; the referee has the sole authority to award goals and thus can override the opinion of the goal judge.

One goal judge is positioned outside the rink directly behind each goal net. For arenas so equipped, the goal judge turns on a red light behind the goal to signal a score. The red goal light and the adjacent green light are connected to the arena game clock. When the clock operator stops the clock, or the time remaining expires, the red light is not able to be activated. In the NHL, the green light is activated only when the game clock reads 00.0 seconds: in lower levels, the green light may be linked to the scoreboard's siren or turn on whenever the time is stopped.

In games governed by the IIHF, goal judges wear the same black-and-white striped shirts as on-ice officials. This is not the case for goal judges in North America for games under different hockey codes: their goal judges are usually dressed in apparel bearing a league or hockey association logo, such as sport coats or athletic jackets.

In the mid-2000s, the National Hockey League relocated goal judges to higher locations (most commonly the press box, a catwalk or the lower section of the upper deck) with wireless signals. The idea was to allow teams to sell the prime seats, but also to give officials a better view of the action as to be able to reject goals if violations (illegally kicked in, a player in the crease, offside) took place. However, with the expansion of video replay and the addition of a second referee on the ice, the role of the goal judge became relegated to activating the goal lights. The league ceased using goal judges after the 2018–2019 season. The video goal judge now activates the goal lights from the video replay booth.

Goal judges were first used around 1877 in Montreal, and were initially called umpires.

=== Video goal judge ===
The video goal judge reviews replays of disputed goals. As the referee does not have access to television monitors, the video goal judge's decision on disputed goals is taken as final. In the NHL, goals may only be reviewed in the following situations: puck crossing the goal line completely and before time expired, puck in the net prior to goal frame being dislodged, puck being directed into the net by hand or foot, the puck deflected into the net off an official, and the puck deflected into the goal by a high stick (stick above the goal) by an attacking player. All NHL goals are subject to review, and although most arenas have a video goal judge, officials from the NHL Hockey Operations Department, located in the Situation Room (also known as the "War Room") at the NHL office in Toronto, will often make the final decision. Arena video goal judges are used in case the communication link with Toronto is not working, and also for other situations such as timing or proper statistic attribution.

=== Official scorer ===
The official scorer keeps the official record of the game. They are responsible for obtaining a list of eligible players from both teams prior to the start of the game. They award points for goals and assists, and their decision in this regard is final. The official scorer typically sits in an elevated position away from the edge of the rink.

=== Penalty timekeeper ===
The penalty timekeeper records the penalties imposed by the referee. He is responsible for ensuring that the correct penalty times are posted on the score clock and that players leave the penalty box at the appropriate times.

=== Game timekeeper ===
The game timekeeper is responsible for stopping and starting the game clock.

=== Statistician ===
The statistician records all required data concerning individual and team performances.

== See also ==
- Director of Officiating (NHL)
- List of NHL on-ice officials
- Hockey Canada Officiating Program
