= Belfast Sabres =

- City: Belfast, Prince Edward Island
- League: Prince Edward Island Junior C Hockey League
- Founded: 2012–13
- Folded: 2017
- Home arena: Belfast Recreation Centre
- Colours: Red, Black, White
- General manager: (Canada) Val Murray
- Head coach: (Canada) Devan Gunn
- Website: www.peijuniorc.com/Sabres

Franchise history
- 2012–2017: Belfast Sabres

The Belfast Sabres (Officially the Belfast Down East Auto Parts Sabres) were a Canadian Junior C ice hockey team located in Belfast, Prince Edward Island. They played out of the Belfast Recreation Centre, and are coached by Devan Gunn. They were members of the Prince Edward Island Junior C Hockey League.

== Team history ==
Unlike the average expansion franchise, the Sabres became a force in the PEIJCHL after only a few years in the league. They finished second in the league in both their second and third seasons, behind only South Side.

By their third season the Sabres had advanced to their first league playoff finals only to lose to the South Side.

== Season by season ==
Season	GP	W	L	T	OTL	GF	GA	P	Results	Playoffs
2012-13	28	16	10	0	2	155	118	34	4th of 6 PEIJHL	Won quarterfinals 3-1 (Crunch); Lost Semifinals 1-4 (Aces)
2013-14	28	19	8	0	1	118	95	49	2nd of 7 PEIJHL	Won quarterfinals 3-1 (Falcons); Lost Semifinals 1-3 (Aces)
2014-15	28	21	7	0	0	137	79	42	2nd of 6 PEIJHL	Won semifinals 3-0 (Aces); Lost League Finals 2-4 (Lynx)
2015-16	28	19	5	0	4	132	69	42	2nd of 6 PEIJHL	Won semifinals 3-1 (Metros); Lost League Finals 0-4 (Lynx)
2016-17	26	15	9	0	2	167	115	32	3rd of 6 PEIJHL	Won Quarterfinals 3-0 (Crunch); Lost Semifinals 2-3 (Metros)
2017-18	Leave of Absence									

== See also ==
- List of ice hockey teams in Prince Edward Island
