= Ice Dogs =

Ice Dogs or IceDogs is the name of several ice hockey teams:

- Barrington Ice Dogs, junior hockey franchise in Barrington, Nova Scotia, Canada
- Bozeman Icedogs, junior ice hockey team in Bozeman, Montana, USA
- Dryden Ice Dogs, junior ice hockey team in Dryden, Ontario, Canada
- Fairbanks Ice Dogs, junior ice hockey team in Fairbanks, Alaska, USA
- Long Beach Ice Dogs, former professional ice hockey team in Long Beach, California, USA
- Mississauga IceDogs, junior ice hockey team in Mississauga, Ontario, Canada
- Niagara IceDogs, junior ice hockey team in St. Catharines, Ontario, Canada
- Salem Ice Dogs, junior ice hockey team in Salem, Massachusetts, USA
- Sydney Ice Dogs, ice hockey team in the Sydney, Australia
