= PJHL =

PJHL can refer to any of the following ice hockey leagues in Canada:

- Provincial Junior Hockey League, a league in Ontario
- Pacific Junior Hockey League, a league in British Columbia.
- Prairie Junior Hockey League, a league in Saskatchewan.
- Prince Edward Island Junior C Hockey League, a league in Prince Edward Island.

For the ice hockey leagues that used to be (or may have been) referred to as the PJHL:

- Pacific Coast Junior Hockey League, a former league in British Columbia.
- Pacific Junior A Hockey League, a former league in British Columbia.
- Peace-Cariboo Junior Hockey League, a former league in British Columbia and Alberta.
- Peace Junior B Hockey League, a former league in British Columbia and Alberta.
