= Nova Scotia Regional Junior Hockey League =

NSRJHL

The Nova Scotia Regional Junior Hockey League is a Junior "C" ice hockey league in Nova Scotia, Canada, sanctioned by Hockey Canada. League playoff winners compete in the Maritime-Hockey North Junior C Championships.

== History ==
In 1999 the West Nova Junior Hockey League began as the first Junior C circuit sanctioned by Hockey Nova Scotia. The league was reorganized prior to the 2004-05 season as the Nova Scotia Junior C Hockey League. It was renamed prior to the 2016-17 season.

Barrington Ice Dogs were the first team to repeat as provincial champion winning titles in 2001, 2004, 2005, 2006 and 2009. Eastern Shore Jr. Mariners would win back-to-back championships in 2010 and 2011 with the Chester Clippers duplicating the feat in 2012 and 2013. Spryfield Attack became a three-time winner in 2018 after previous titles in 2014 and 2016.

Justin MacLellan of the Avon River Rats made headlines after a 10-point game on January 14, 2018.

== Current Teams ==
Team	Centre	Formed
Admirals Hockey Club	Bridgetown	2023
East Hants Jr. C Penguins	East Hants	2017
Eastern Shore Thunder	Eastern Shore	2016
Newport Titans	Newport	2023
Sackville Knights	Sackville	2018
South Shore Schooners	Chester	2019
South West Storm	Barrington	2021
Spryfield Attack	Spryfield	2011

== Champions ==
League playoff winners
Season	Champions	Runner-up	Result (best-of 7)
2000	Thorburn Mohawks		
2001	Barrington Ice Dogs		
2002	Yarmouth Raiders		
2003	**Chebucto Canadians**		
2004	Barrington Ice Dogs		
2005	**Barrington Ice Dogs**	Yarmouth Raiders	4-1
2006	Barrington Ice Dogs		
2007	New Waterford Jets	Clare Lions	
2008	Harbour Crunch		
2009	**Barrington Ice Dogs**		
2010	**Eastern Shore Jr. Mariners**		
2011	Eastern Shore Jr. Mariners	Chester Clippers	
2012	**Chester Clippers**	Clare Lions	
2013	Chester Clippers	Barrington Ice Dogs	4-1
2014	**Spryfield Silver and Black Attack**	MU Rhino Renovations	4-1
2015	MU Rhino Renovations	Spryfield Attack	4-1
2016	Spryfield Silver and Black Attack	Metro Jaguars	4-2
2017	Metro Jaguars	Avon River Rats	4-2
2018	Spryfield Attack	Eastern Shore Thunder	4-3
2019	Spryfield Attack	Eastern Shore Thunder	4-3
2020	Eastern Shore Thunder	Chester Castaways	4-0
2021	Chester Castaways	East Hants Penguins	3-1 covid halted
2022	South West Storm	East Hants Penguins	4-1
2023	**South West Storm**	East Hants Penguins	4-3
2024	South West Storm	East Hants Penguins	4-3
2025	**East Hants Penguins**	Spryfield Attack	4-0
2026	**Admirals Hockey Club**	East Hants Penguins	4-2

Teams in bold went on to win the Maritime-Hockey North Junior C Championship.

=== Defunct teams ===
- Antigonish Jr. C Hockey Club (2000-04)
- Avon River Rats (2007-18) - renamed **Windsor Royals**
- Barrington Ice Dogs (2004-15) return 20211 as South West Storm
- Bedford Wolverines (2015-17)
- Chebucto Canadians (2000-04)
- Chester Clippers/Northside Vics (2008-13; 2013-14) return as Chester Castaways 2019
- Claire Lions (2005-15)
- Chester Castaways (2019-2023} - South Shore Schooners - 2023-
- Cumberland/Colchester Colts (2016-19)
- East Hants Penguins/Halifax Thunder (2004-06; 2006-09)
- Harbour Crunch/Eastern Shore Jr. Mariners (2006-09; 2009-11)
- Fundy Phantoms/Rhinos (2004-13; 2013-15)
- Metro Jaguars (2015-17)
- New Waterford Jets (2005-11)
- North Shore Storm/Oxford Colts/Amherst Colts (2004-08; 2009-10; 2010-12; 2012-14; 2015-16) - renamed **Cumberland/Colchester Colts**
- Shannon Huskies (2012-13)
- South Shore Wild (2007-14)
- Thorburn Mohawks (2000-04)
- Valley Fuelers (2009-11)
- **Windsor Royals** (2007-2019)
- Yarmouth Admirals (2006-09)
- Yarmouth Kings (2009-10)
- Yarmouth Raiders (2000-05)

== See also ==
- List of ice hockey teams in Nova Scotia
