= Hockey PEI =

Canadian ice hockey governing body

- Sport: Ice hockey
- Jurisdiction: Prince Edward Island
- Founded: 1974

Official website
- hockeypei.com
- (Canada)
- (Prince Edward Island)

Former emblem

The Hockey PEI is the governing body of ice hockey in Prince Edward Island, Canada. Hockey PEI is a branch of Hockey Canada. The organization has been in existence since 1974. It is subdivided into six smaller councils - Minor Hockey Council, Female Hockey Council, Junior Hockey Council, Senior Hockey Council, Development Council, and Officials Council. Hockey PEI has approximately 8,000 members throughout the province.

== History ==
The Maritime Amateur Hockey Association (MAHA) was granted a branch membership within the Canadian Amateur Hockey Association (CAHA) in 1928, with its jurisdiction including the Maritimes provinces of New Brunswick, Nova Scotia and Prince Edward Island.

The New Brunswick Amateur Hockey Association separated from the MAHA and became its own branch of the CAHA in 1968. The MAHA ceased to exist when the Nova Scotia Hockey Association was granted branch status in the CAHA in 1974, and then the Prince Edward Island Hockey Association was formed and also granted branch status in the CAHA.

== Notable leagues ==
- Maritime Junior A Hockey League (Tier II Junior "A")
- Island Junior Hockey League (Junior "B")
- Prince Edward Island Minor Junior Hockey League (Junior "C")
- New Brunswick-PEI Major Midget Hockey League (Major-Minor)

== Board of directors ==
Hockey PEI is run by a board of ten directors. The current president is Barry Thompson, since 2015.

=== Past presidents ===
- Pius Callaghan (1974–1976)
- Clair Sudsbury (1976–1980)
- Paul Jelley (1980–1981)
- Wayne MacDougall (1981–1985)
- Ken Doucette (1985–1988)
- Cecil Taylor (1988–1992)
- Jim Molyneaux (1992–1993)
- Brian Cameron (1993–1995)
- Don Blacquire (1995–1996)
- John Brehaut (1996–2000)
- Allie Woolridge (2000–2002)
- George Trainor (2002–2004)
- Wendall Shaw (2004–2006)
- Gordie Lund (2006–2008)
- Gordie Whitlock (2008–2010)
- Gene Power (2010–2012)
- Goops Wooldridge (2012–2015)
- Barry Thompson (2015–present)

== See also ==
- List of ice hockey teams in Prince Edward Island
