= South Side Lynx =

- City: Crapaud, Prince Edward Island
- League: Prince Edward Island Junior C Hockey League
- Founded: 2009–10
- Home arena: South Shore Actiplex
- Colours: Navy, Silver, White
- General manager: Steve Watts
- Head coach: TBD
- Website: www.peijuniorc.com/Southside

The South Side Lynx (officially the South Side MacDonald's Excavation/EF MacPhee Lynx) are a Canadian Junior C ice hockey team based in Crapaud, Prince Edward Island. They are members of the Prince Edward Island Junior C Hockey League. They are coached by Paul Dawson and play out of the South Shore Actiplex. The Lynx have won the Razzy's PEI Junior C league title on three occasions in 2015, 2016 and 2017.

== History ==
The South Side Lynx were founded in 2009. As with many expansion franchises, they struggled in their early years, never advancing past the first round of the playoffs until season three in 2011–12, where they were eliminated by Pownal Red Devils in the semifinals.

The Lynx appeared in the league finals for the first time in 2013, losing to Tignish in four games.

Two years later, in 2014-15 the Lynx won the league title, advancing on to the Maritime-Hockey North Junior C Championship in Charlottetown. They defeated the MU Rhinos of the Nova Scotia Junior Hockey League to advance to the final, where they were defeated by Nunavut's Baffin Blizzard.

After 20 games played in the 2018–19 the team ceased operations due to a lack of healthy players. After sitting out the next season the Lynx returned to the ice for 2020–21.

== Season by season ==
Season	GP	W	L	T	OTL	Pts	GF	GA	Results	Playoffs
2009–10	26	5	16	2	3	15	87	142	6th of 6	Lost first round 1-3 vs North River Flames
2010–11	28	13	15	0	0	26	125	134	5th of 8	Lost first round 0-3 vs Summerside Crunch
2011–12	28	10	15	1	2	23	118	139	6th of 8	Won first round 3-1 vs North River Flames Lost semifinals 1-4 vs Pownal Red Devils
2012–13	28	20	6	0	2	42	135	91	2nd of 6	Won semifinals 4-0 vs North River Flames Lost finals 4-0 vs Tignish Aces
2013–14	28	23	3	0	3	49	146	73	1st of 7	Won semifinals 3-2 vs Souris Hawks Lost finals 1-4 vs Tignish Aces
2014–15	28	21	5	0	2	44	173	75	1st of 6	Won semifinals 3-0 vs Sherwood Falcons Won finals 4-0 vs Belfast Sabres
2015-16	28	20	6	0	2	42	134	96	1st of 6	Won semifinals 3-0 vs Tignish Aces; Won finals 4-0 vs Belfast Sabres
2016-17	26	20	6	0	-	40	150	96	1st of 6	Won semifinals 3-0 vs North River Flames; Won finals 4-2 Sherwood Metros
2017-18	28	17	10	0	1	35	140	113	3rd of 6	Won quarterfinals 3-0 vs Georgetown Eagles; Lost semifinals 0-3 vs Tignish Aces
2018-19	20	5	13	0	2	-	-	-	Ceased operations	DNP: lack of healthy players
2021-22	16	2	14	0	0	4	31	95	5th of 5	Lost Play In 0-2 vs North River Flames
2022-23	28	4	22	1	1	11	67	180	5th of 5	Won Play In 2-1 vs Sherwood Metros; Lost Semifinals, 0-4 Tignish Aces
2023-24	24	7	15	x	2	16	84	142	4th of 5	Lost Play In 1-2 vs Sherwood Metros
2024-25	25	4	21	x	0	8	79	179	6th of 6	Lost Play In 0-3 vs Sherwood Metros

== Maritime-Hockey North Junior C Championship ==
Year	Round Robin	Record	Standing	Semifinal	Bronze Medal Game	Gold Medal Game
2015	W, Baffin Blizzard 5-4; L, Truro Rhinos 1-5; OTW, Sherwood Falcons 5-4; L, Western Valley Panthers 2-5	2-2-0	4th of 5	W, Truro Rhinos 3-2	n/a	L, Baffin Blizzard 5-6
2016	L, Western Valley Panthers 2-6; L, Spryfield Attack 2-5; L, Kivalliq Canucks 4-6; L, Tri-County River Cats 0-4	0-4-0	5th of 5	DNQ	n/a	n/a
2017	L, Southern Sting 1-13; W, Metro Jaguars 4-2; W, Cumberland/Colchester Colts 6-0; W, Baffin Blizzard 6-3	3-1-0	2nd of 5	OTL, Metro Jaguars 3-4	n/a	n/a
2018; Host	L, Tri-County River Cats 4-5; W, Baffin Blizzard 4-3; L, Sherwood Metros 1-5; L, Spryfield Attack 1-5	1-3-0	4th of 5	W, Tri-County River Cats 4-3	n/a	L, Sherwood Metros 1-4

== South Side Lynx all-time scoring leaders ==
Rank	Name	Games played	Goals	Assists	Points
1	Rob Miller	128	99	125	224
2	Colton Dawson	125	86	135	221
3	Brady Vandervelden	121	121	98	219
4	Chad Murphy	128	93	84	177
5	Cody Dawson	124	64	105	169
6	Andy Murphy	135	62	95	157
7	Joel McIsaac	121	51	71	122
8	Cody Miller	52	42	54	96
9	Marshall Thomas	130	24	66	90
10	Nick Vandervelden	83	28	56	1002

== See also ==
- List of ice hockey teams in Prince Edward Island
