= Shediac/Cap-Pele Predators =

The Shediac/Cap-Pele Predators were a Junior ice hockey team from Shediac, Scoudouc, Grand-Barachois and Cap-Pelé in New Brunswick, Canada. The Predators played in the New Brunswick Junior C Hockey League.

== History ==
The team was founded in 2000. The Predators were Maritime-North Junior Hockey Champions in 2006, 2007, and 2008 by winning the Maritime-Hockey North Junior C Championships.

In the Summer of 2011, the Predators folded. With this, the league ceased operations, and the Hampton Hurricanes moved up to Junior B thus ending the tenure of the NBJHL.
