= Spryfield Attack =

- City: Spryfield, Nova Scotia
- League: Nova Scotia Regional Junior Hockey League
- Division: Junior C
- Founded: 1989
- Home arena: Spryfield Lion's Arena
- Colours: Silver, Black and White
- Owner: Stephen Adams
- General manager: Stephen Adams (2011-17)
- Head coach: Paul Strople (2017-2018)
- Website: www.spryfieldattackhockey.com

Franchise history
- 2011–2016: Spryfield Silver & Black Attack
- 2016–present: Spryfield Attack

The Spryfield Attack are a Canadian Junior ice hockey team from Spryfield, Nova Scotia. They compete in the Nova Scotia Regional Junior Hockey League as members of Hockey Nova Scotia and Hockey Canada and are the winners of the 2014 Maritime-Hockey North Junior C Championship. Spryfield Attack for the second time were 2015-16 Nova Scotia Junior C Champions and 'silver medalists' in the 2015-16 Maritime North Junior Hockey Champions in New Brunswick.

== History ==
The Spryfield Silver and Black Attack was founded in 1989 as a Junior Hockey Team based out of Spryfield, Nova Scotia. In their first year, they finished third in the League, and won the Provincial title. The team continued in operation for 1990. In 1991, the team was turned over to Chebucto Minor Hockey, as their owner and founder, Stephen Adams, became an Alderman for the City of Halifax.

In 2010, Stephen Adams and Paul Strople made a presentation to the Nova Scotia Junior C Hockey League to become the newest Junior B franchise in the province. That application was unsuccessful. In 2011, Adams and Strople presented to the NSJCHL, as they sought to become the only Junior C franchise in HRM. The application was approved unanimously by the league.

In their first year of operation, Spryfield finished third overall and set a league record for wins by a new franchise, with 18. For the 2016-17 season the team shortened their name to the Spryfield Attack.

== Coaches ==
- Paul Strople (2011-2014)
- Alex Mader (2015-2016)
- Dylan Hearns (2016-2017)
- Paul Strople (2017- )

== Season-by-season record ==
Note: GP = Games played, W = Wins, L = Losses, OTL = Overtime Losses, Pts = Points, GF = Goals for, GA = Goals against, PIM = Penalties in minutes

Season	GP	W	L	OTL; SOL	Pts	GF	GA	PIM	Finish	Playoffs
2011-12	28	17	11	0	34	119	111	-	2nd of 4 Central; 3 of 8 NSJRCHL	data not found
2012-13	28	18	10	0	36	169	139	-	3 of 9 NSJRCHL	Won quarter-finals, 3-0 (Wild); Lost semi-finals, 1-4 (Ice Dogs)
2013-14	28	23	4	1	47	168	69	1617	1st of 9 NSJRCHL	Won semi-finals, 4-0 (Ice Dogs); Won finals, 4-1 (Rhinos); NSJRCHL Champions
2014-15	28	22	6	0	44	147	72	-	2 of 5 NSJRCHL	Won semi-finals, 4-0 ( Lost League Finals, 1-4 (Rhino)
2015-16	27	22	3	2	46	211	97	-	1st of 5 NSJRCHL	Won semi-finals, 4-1 (Wolverines); Won League Finals, 42 (Jaguars); NSJRCHL Champions
2016-17	29	17	7	5	39	187	110	-	3 of 6 NSJRCHL	Won quarter-finals, 3-0 (Wolverines); Lost semi-finals, 2-4 (River Rats)
2017-18	30	25	3	2	52	225	91	-	1 of 5 NSJRCHL	Won semi-finals, 4-0 (Colts); Won finals, 4-3 (Thunder); NSJRCHL Champions
2018-19	29	22	5	2	46	178	94	-	1 of 6 NSJRCHL	Won semi-finals, 4-3 (Royals); Won finals, 4-3 (Thunder); NSJRCHL Champions
2019-20	24	17	7	0	34	133	92	-	1 of 5 NSJRCHL	Lost semi-finals, 2-4 (Castaways)
2020-21	12	6	6	0	12	56	56	-	4 of 5 NSJRCHL	Won Preliminary, 2-0 (Knights); Lost semifinals, 2-4 (Penguins)
2021-22	12	7	11	2	16	78	103	-	5 of 6 NSJRCHL	Lost quarterfinals, 0-2 (Storm)
2022-23	23	10	11	2	22	94	90	-	4 of 6 NSJRCHL	Lost quarterfinals, 1-3 (Thunder)
2023-24	24	12	10	2	26	101	91	-	6 of 8 NSJRCHL	Lost quarterfinals, 2-3 (Storm)
2024-25	28	25	3	0	50	159	106	-	1 of 8 NSJRCHL	Won Semifinals, 3-1 (Storm); Lost (Penguins)
2025-26	27	16	9	2	34	133	107	-	3 of 8 NSJRCHL	Lost Semifinals, 0-3 (Thunder)

== Maritime-Hockey North Junior C Championship ==
Atlantic Canada Jr C Championships

Season	Round Robin	Record	Standing	Semifinal	Gold Medal Game
2014	T, Kivalliq Canucks 3-3; W, Hampton Hurricanes 3-0; W, Tignish Aces 3-2; W, South Shore Wild 6-1	3-0-1	2 of 4	W, Tignish Aces 10-1	W, Hampton Hurricanes 3-1; CHAMPIONS
2016	L, Tri-County River Cats, 1-6; W, South Side Lynx 5-2; W, Western Valley Panthers 4-2; W, Kivalliq Canucks 5-4	3-1-0	2 of 5	W, Kivalliq Canucks 3-1	L, Western Valley Panthers 2-7; Finalists
2018	W, Sherwood Metros, 4-1; OTL, Tri-County River Cats 2-3; OTL, Baffin Blizzard 6-7; W, South Side Lynx 5-1	2-0-2	3rd of 5	L, Sherwood Metros 3-4	did not qualify
2019	L, Western Valley Panthers, 3-7; L, Tignish Aces, 3-6; L, Tri-County River Cats, 1-6; L, Kivalliq Canucks, 4-6	0-5-0	5th of 5	did not qualify	did not qualify
