= South West Storm =

- City: Barrington, Nova Scotia
- League: Nova Scotia Regional Junior Hockey League
- Founded: 1999
- Home arena: Barrington Municipal Arena
- Colours: Red, Black and White
- General manager: Andrew Holland
- Head coach: Andrew Holland

Franchise history
- 1999–2016: Barrington Ice Dogs
- 2021–present: South West Storm

The South West Storm are a Junior hockey franchise based in Barrington, Nova Scotia.They played in the Nova Scotia Regional Junior Hockey League.

== History ==
The 2021-22 hockey season saw the return of junior hockey in Barrington with the South West Storm rejoining the Nova Scotia Regional Junior Hockey League.

Prior to the Storm, Barrington was represented by the Barrington Ice Dogs. The Ice Dogs are five-time Nova Scotia Provincial Jr. C Champions, winning titles in 2001, 2004, 2005, 2006, and 2009. They have also appeared in four (2004, 2005, 2006, 2009) Maritime-Hockey North Junior C Championships winning titles in 2005 and 2009. In his eight years behind the bench, Dana McCarthy was the most successful Head Coach in team history, guiding the team to four of its five Nova Scotia Championships, as well as both Maritime-Hockey North titles. Joshua Merrick back stopped the ice dogs to their last championship winning best goalie in maritime north with best sv% and GAA. In their last winning season the ice dogs won both the provincial championship and maritime championship with captain Tyson Townsend who was tragically lost at sea while fishing on February 17, 2013.

The Ice Dogs drew the biggest crowds of any team in the NSJRCHL with approx. 500-1500 per game, with their most vocal fans occupying "The Dog Pound" overlooking the opposition's end of the arena.

The Ice Dogs announced that they would be taking a leave of absence for the 2015-16 season. Losing the closest and biggest rival for the Clare Lions, the Lions also elected to take a leave of absence. Both teams remain out of the league as of 2020.

Barrington returned to Jr. C Hockey with the arrival of the South West Storm for the 2021-22 season.

== Season-by-Season Standings ==
SOUTH WEST STORM
Season	GP	W	L	OTL	SOL	GF	GA	P	Results	Playoffs
2021-22										
2022-23										
2023-24	24	17	6	1	0	126	71	35	3rd of 8	Won Quarterfinals, 3-2 (Spryfield Attack); Won Semifinals, 3-2 (Sackville Knights); Won League Finals 4-3 East Hants Penguins; NSRJHL CHAMPIONS advance to Maritime-North Jr C
2024-25	28	9	15	4	0	84	121	22	6th of 8	Lost Quarterfinals, 0-2 (East Hants Penguins)
2025-26	27	10	16	0	1	99	125	21	8th of 8	Lost Quarterfinals, 0-3 (East Hants Penguins)

== Maritime-Hockey North Junior C Championship ==
Year	Round Robin	Record	Standing	SemiFinal	Br. Med. Game	Gold Medal Game
2023	W, Tignish Aces 7-4; W, Sherwood Metros 6-2; L, Tri-County River Cats 3-4	2-1-0	2nd of 4	W, Sherwood Metros 6-3	n/a	OTW, Tri-County River Cats 3-2; CHAMPIONS
2024	L, Pownal Ice Dogs 3-6; L, Sunny Cnr Thunder 0-7; L, Tri-County River Cats 2-11	0-3-0	4th of 4	L, Tri-County River Cats; 3-5	n/a	n/a
2025	L, Sherwood Metros 2-5; L, Tri-County River Cats 2-5; L, East Hants Penguins 2-8	0-3-0	4th of 4	n/a	n/a	n/a
