= Maritime-Hockey North Junior C Championship =

The Maritime-Hockey North Junior C Championship are the Junior "C" ice hockey championships for the Maritime Junior "C" leagues and Hockey North's Team Nunavut of the Canadian Territory of Nunavut.

== History ==
The championship was officially adopted by Hockey Canada during a summer meeting in 2002.

The first ever Maritime-North Championship was won by the Chebucto Canadians of Nova Scotia in the Spring of 2003. Chebucto defeated the Dieppe/Memramcook Voyageurs of the New Brunswick Junior C Hockey League 4–3 in triple overtime to win the title.

On April 14, 2012, the tenth anniversary of the tournament, Nunavut's Kivalliq Canucks defeated Prince Edward Island's Pownal Red Wings 3–1 to become the first Hockey North-based team in the tournament's history to make the final. Kivalliq would eventually lose the final 7–3 to Nova Scotia's Chester Clippers.

The 2015 tournament in Sherwood, Prince Edward Island marked the first time in tournament history that neither team in the final represented New Brunswick or Nova Scotia. Baffin made the final by upsetting New Brunswick's Western Valley Panthers while PEI's South Side Lynx beat Nova Scotia's Truro Rhinos to reach the championship game. This would mark only the second time a Hockey North team made the final and the first time ever a PEI team had made it. Baffin led 6-1 early in the second, only to have South Side battle back to within one goal. Baffin won the game 6–5 to win Nunavut's first Maritime-Hockey North junior hockey title.

== 2025 competition ==
2025 Tournament
Rank	Team	League	W-L-OTL	GF	GA
1	Tri-County River Cats	NBJHL	0-0-0	0	0
2	East Hants Penguins	NSJCHL	0-0-0-0	0	0
3	Sherwood Metros	PEIJCHL	0-0-0-0	0	0
4	South West Storm	Host	0-0-0-0	0	0

=== Results ===
April 24

Tri-County River Cats - 0 vs. East Hants Penguins - 0
Sherwood Metros - 0 vs. South West Storm - 0

April 25

Sherwood Metros - 0 vs. East Hants Penguins - 0
South West Storm - 0 vs. Tri-County River Cats - 0

April 26

Tri-County River Cats - 0 vs. Sherwood Metros - 0
East Hants Penguins - 0 vs. South West Storm - 0

April 27 - Semi Final

tbd - 0 vs. tbd - 0
tbd - 0 vs. tbd - 0

April 28 - Final

tbd - 0 vs. tbd - 0

== Competing leagues ==
- Hockey North - missing the 2024 tournament
- New Brunswick Junior B Hockey League
- Nova Scotia Regional Junior C Hockey League
- Prince Edward Island Junior C Hockey League

== Champions ==
Maritime-Hockey North Junior C Champions
Year	Champions	Runners-Up	Host City
2003	Chebucto Canadians	Dieppe/Memramcook Voyageurs	Yarmouth, Nova Scotia
2004	Fredericton Rangers	Barrington Ice Dogs	Fredericton, New Brunswick
2005	Barrington Ice Dogs	Kent-Sud Flames	Tignish, Prince Edward Island
2006	Shediac/Cap-Pele Predators	Barrington Ice Dogs	Lantz, Nova Scotia
2007	Shediac/Cap-Pele Predators	Dieppe/Memramcook Voyageurs	Shediac, New Brunswick
2008	Shediac/Cap-Pele Predators	Harbour Crunch	Cornwall, Prince Edward Island
2009	Barrington Ice Dogs	Clare Lions	Barrington, Nova Scotia
2010	Eastern Shore Jr. Mariners	Shediac/Cap-Pele Predators	Fredericton, New Brunswick
2011	Clare Lions	Eastern Shore Jr. Mariners	Church Point, Nova Scotia
2012	Chester Clippers	Kivalliq Canucks	Tignish, Prince Edward Island
2013	Hampton Hurricanes	Western Valley Panthers	Hampton, New Brunswick
2014	Spryfield Silver & Black Attack	Hampton Hurricanes	Liverpool, Nova Scotia
2015	Baffin Blizzard	South Side Lynx	Sherwood, Prince Edward Island
2016	Western Valley Panthers	Spryfield Silver & Black Attack	Fredericton Junction, New Brunswick
2017	Southern Sting	Metro Jaguars	Springhill, Nova Scotia
2018	Sherwood Metros	South Side Lynx	Crapaud, Prince Edward Island
2019	Tri-County Rivercats	Western Valley Panthers	Woodstock, New Brunswick
2020	Cancelled due to the COVID-19 pandemic		Hartland, New Brunswick
2021	Cancelled due to the COVID-19 pandemic
2022	Western Valley Panthers	South West Storm	East Hants, Nova Scotia
2023	South West Storm	Tri-County Rivercats	Sherwood, Prince Edward Island
2024	Tri-County Rivercats	South West Storm	Miramichi, New Brunswick
