= Avon River Rats =

Windsor Royals
- City: Windsor, Nova Scotia
- League: Nova Scotia Junior C Hockey League
- Founded: 2012
- Folded: 2020
- Home arena: Hants Exhibition Arena
- Colours: Red, Royal Blue, White
- General manager: (Canada) Darrell Lyttle
- Head coach: (Canada) Pierre McGuire
- Website: www.nsjrchl.com/Avon

Franchise history
- 2012–2018: Avon River Rats
- 2018–2020: Windsor Royals

The Windsor Royals were a Canadian Junior C ice hockey team based in Windsor, Nova Scotia. For their first three seasons the club was known as the Avon River Rats and they played in the Nova Scotia Junior C Hockey League. The team was advised they were in copyright violation with the River Rats. Prior to the 2018-19 season they obtained the name of the Windsor Royals (formerly a team in the league which folded) and re-branded the organization. They are coached by Mike LaPierre. They have historically been a playoff contender, but rarely progressing deep.

== Season-by-season record ==
Note: GP = Games played, W = Wins, L = Losses, OTL = Overtime Losses, Pts = Points, GF = Goals for, GA = Goals against, PIM = Penalties in minutes

Season	GP	W	L	OTL	Pts	GF	GA	PIM	Finish	Playoffs
2015-16	27	15	12	0	30	144	129	-	3 of 5 NSJRCHL	Lost Semi Finals, 1-2 (Jaguars)
2016-17	28	21	5	2	44	154	103	-	2 of 6 NSJRCHL	Won Semi Finals, 4-2 (Attack); Lost League Finals. 2-4 (Jaguars)
2017-18	32	20	12	0	40	173	139	-	3 of 5 NSJRCHL	Lost Semi Finals, 1-4 (Thunder)
Windsor Royals
2018-19	29	12	17	0	24	123	142	-	4 of 6 NSJRCHL	Won Quarter Finals, 3-0 ((Colts)); Lost Semi Finals, 3-4 (Attack)
