= Prince Edward Island Junior C Hockey League =

PEI Junior C Hockey League
- Countries: Canada
- Commissioner: Chris Hedefine
- Junior Council Chair: Clifford Affleck
- Former name: PEI Minor Junior Hockey League
- Founded: 1991
- No. of teams: 5
- Recent champions: Tignish Aces (2019)
- Most successful club: Tignish Aces (10 titles)

The Prince Edward Island Junior C Hockey League is a Junior "C" ice hockey league in Prince Edward Island, Canada, sanctioned by Hockey Canada. The league was known as the Prince Edward Island Minor Junior Hockey League until 2009.

The winner of the playoffs competes in the Maritime-Hockey North Junior C Championship.

Late in the 2023-24 season the league changed sponsors, welcoming a rebrand to the Township Chevrolet Jr Hockey League.

== History ==
In 2015 the South Side Lynx won their first league championship and then proceeded to be the first PEI representative to advance to the Maritime-Hockey North Junior C Championship final game. In the championship game the Lynx played against the Baffin Blizzard with both teams vying to be the first team from their province/territory to claim a Maritime-Hockey North title. The Baffin Blizzard prevailed, winning 6–5.

After a one-year absence a Summerside team, now known as the Crunch, was announced as returning to the league for the 2016–17 season.

Sherwood Metros became the first PEI team to win the Maritime-Hockey North Championship in 2018. The Metros defeated South Side Lynx 4–1 in the final.

In January 2019 the South Side Lynx ceased operations due to a lack of healthy players. The team posted a 5–13–0–2 record, last in the five-team league. The team announced a return for 2020–21.

== Teams ==
Team	Centre	First season
Morell Lions	Morell	2024–25
North River Flames	Cornwall	2005–06
Pownal Ice Dogs	Pownal	2019–20
Sherwood Metros	Sherwood	2015–16
Tignish Aces	Tignish	2002–03
Wellington Flyers	Wellington	2025–26

=== Former teams (1997–present) ===
- Bedeque Red Wings (1998–99)
- Belfast Sabres (2001–17)
- Charlottetown Abbies (1997–2005; 2009–12)
- Evangeline Loggers (2005–07)
- Georgetown Eagles (2017–18)
- Georgetown Timberwolves (1997–98)
- Holland College Hurricanes (2010–12)
- Montague Norsemen (1998–2001; 2003–04)
- Montague Sharks (2010–11)
- Morell Crunch (2010–13)
- Morell Flyers (2003–10; 2015–16)
- Morell Mustangs (1997–2002)
- North River Flames (1997–98) - returned to league in 2005
- Pownal Nicks (1997–98)
- Pownal Red Devils (2003–12)
- Rustico Whitecaps (1999–2005)
- Sherwood Falcons (1997–98; 1999–2009; 2013–15)
- Souris Boat Haulers (2008–09)
- Souris Hawks (1999–2000; 2013–15)
- South Side Lynx (2001–2019) - returned to league in (2020-2025)
- Summerside Capitals (2003–05; 2013–14)
- Summerside Crunch (2016–20)
- Tignish Aces (1997–98; 2000–01) - returned to league in 2002
- Tyne Valley Clover Farmers (2001–06; 2011–13)

== Champions ==
Playoff Champions
Season	Champion	Finalist	Result
1992	Kings County Kings		
1993	Sherwood Falcons		
1994	North River Flames		
1995	Sherwood Falcons		
1996	North River Flames		
1997	North River Flames		
1998	Tignish Aces	Charlottetown Abbies	4–3
1999	Charlottetown Abbies	Morell Mustangs	4–0
2000	Charlottetown Abbies	Souris Hawks	2–0
2001	Montague Norsemen	Sherwood Falcons	3–0
2002	Sherwood Falcons	Rustico Whitecaps	4–2
2003	Tignish Aces	Sherwood Falcons	4–3
2004	Sherwood Falcons	South Side Lynx	4–2
2005	Tignish Aces	Sherwood Falcons	4–1
2006	Sherwood Falcons	Tignish Aces	4–3
2007	Sherwood Falcons	North River Flames	3–2
2008	Tignish Aces	North River Flames	4–1
2009	Tignish Aces	North River Flames	4–3
2010	Tignish Aces	Charlottetown Abbies	4–0
2011	Charlottetown Abbies	Tignish Aces	4–3
2012	Tignish Aces	Pownal Red Devils	4–2
2013	Tignish Aces	South Side Lynx	4–0
2014	Tignish Aces	Southside Lynx	4–1
2015	South Side Lynx	Belfast Sabres	4–2
2016	South Side Lynx	Belfast Sabres	4–0
2017	South Side Lynx	Sherwood Metros	4–2
2018	Sherwood Metros	Tignish Aces	4–3
2019	Tignish Aces	Sherwood Metros	4–1
2020	Cancelled due to Covid-19 pandemic		
2021	Cancelled due to Covid-19 pandemic		
2022	Pownal Ice Dogs	Sherwood Metros	3–0
2023	Tignish Aces	Pownal Ice Dogs	4–1
2024	Tignish Aces	Pownal Ice Dogs	4–1
2025	Tignish Aces	Pownal Ice Dogs	4–2
2026	Tignish Aces	Pownal Ice Dogs	4–0

== See also ==
- List of ice hockey teams in Prince Edward Island
- Island Junior Hockey League
