= List of ice hockey teams in Prince Edward Island =

This is a list of ice hockey teams that compete in Prince Edward Island. This list includes active professional, university, and junior men's ice hockey teams.

== Alphabetical list of teams ==
The leagues are correct for the 2024–25 season.

Team	League
Charlottetown Islanders	Quebec Maritimes Junior Hockey League
Kensington Vipers	New Brunswick Junior Hockey League
Morell Lions	Prince Edward Island Junior C Hockey League
North River Flames	Prince Edward Island Junior C Hockey League
Pownal Ice Dogs	Prince Edward Island Junior C Hockey League
Sherwood Metros	Prince Edward Island Junior C Hockey League
South Side Lynx	Prince Edward Island Junior C Hockey League
Summerside Western Capitals	Maritime Junior Hockey League
Tignish Aces	Prince Edward Island Junior C Hockey League
UPEI Panthers	Atlantic University Sport

== See also ==
- Hockey PEI
