= South Shore Schooners =

- City: Chester, Nova Scotia
- League: Nova Scotia Regional Junior Hockey League
- Founded: 2008
- Home arena: Eleanor Pew Arena
- Colours: Blue, Orange and White
- Owner: TBA
- General manager: Loretta Randall (2023-present)
- Head coach: Kerry Haley (2023-present)

Franchise history
- 2008–2013: Chester Clippers
- 2013–2014: Northside Vics
- 2019–2023: Chester Castaways
- 2023–present: South Shore Schooners

The South Shore Schooners are a Junior C ice hockey team based in Chester, Nova Scotia, Canada. This franchise was established in 2019 returning the city to the Nova Scotia Regional Junior Hockey League. The previous franchise began in 2008 as the Chester Clippers before relocating to Sydney, where they played as the Northside Vics. The Vics only lasted one season before folding, however they did not participate in the 2013-14 season. The team played in the Nova Scotia Junior C Hockey League.

== History ==
As the Clippers, this franchise won the 2012 Maritime-Hockey North Junior C Championships and two Nova Scotia Junior C championships.

The team was founded in 2008 by Jehad Assaff and a group of volunteers from Chester, Nova Scotia, before being sold to a North Sydney group headed by Jordan Evasuk-MacDonald in July 2013.

On September 13, 2008, the team showed that Chester could compete at the Junior C level by playing their first ever exhibition game and beat the Liverpool-based South Shore Wild by a score of 4–3. Tyler Arsenault opened up the scoring for Chester at 4:54 in the first period, Kyle Young and Chad Jollimore scored the second and third goal respectively. Bryce Andersen netted the game-winner at 16:28 of the 3rd period. This marked the first ever franchise win for Chester.

The Chester Clippers won the 2009–10 Ice Dogs Early Bird Pre-season Tournament with a 6–3 win over the Eastern Shore Jr. Mariners in the final game on September 27, 2009.

The Clippers continue to move in the right direction as they set many new league and franchise records in 2010–11. The Chester Clippers set new league regular season records for most goals scored (278) and fewest goals against (55), while setting a new franchise record for most wins in a season with 28.

In 2010-11, Clippers forward Justin Norris broke the league's scoring record by reaching 119 points in 29 games. While, defenseman Jordan Kenny set a new league record for points by a defender with 59 pts in 25 games. Justin Norris was selected as the Nova Scotia Jr. C Hockey League's Most Valuable Player in both the regular season and playoffs. Goaltender Alex Mader won the statistical award for Top Goals-against-average (GAA), posting a league-best 1.93 GAA during the regular season.

Fans witnessed more history in 2011–12, as the Clippers became the first team in league history to go undefeated in the regular season (28-0). The Chester squad went 11–1 in the playoffs to win their first provincial championship and then went on to win the Maritime-Hockey North Junior C Championships.

In 2012-13, the Chester Clippers finished with 25 wins and 3 losses to capture their third consecutive regular season championship. Chester then went on to defeat Fundy (quarter-finals), Shannon (semi-finals), and Barrington (finals) to win their second straight Nova Scotia Junior C Hockey League and provincial championship. The Clippers went 2-2 in the round-robin portion of the 2013 Maritime-Hockey North Junior C Championships and finished 4th out of 5 teams, to advance to the semi-finals, where they suffered a heart-breaking 5–4 loss to the eventual tournament champions, Hampton Hurricanes.

On Monday July 22, 2013, the Nova Scotia Junior "C" Hockey League's Board of Governors approved the transfer and relocation of the defending champion Clippers to a group based in Industrial Cape Breton.

The Clippers were scheduled to play out of Bedford, Nova Scotia prior to relocating from Chester to Cape Breton, however after numerous attempts the Bedford situation could not work out in the best interests of the club and the league. As of the 2013–14 season, the franchise would be known as the Northside Vics. The Northside Vics or Victorias is common hockey club name in the area historically, including a Junior A club by that name in the 1970s Eastern Junior A Hockey League.

Junior C hockey returned to Chester with the Chester Castaways joining the Nova Scotia Regional Hockey League for the 2019-20 season, where they went to the league finals in their 1st season in Chester, eventually falling to old time rivals Eastern Shore in 4 straight games.

On May 30, 2023, the team was renamed as the South Shore Schooners.

== Championships ==
Maritime-Hockey North Junior C Championships: 1 (2011–12)

Nova Scotia Junior C Hockey League League Championships: 2 (2011–12, 2012–13)

Nova Scotia Junior C Hockey League Division Championships: 2 (2010–11, 2011–12)

Nova Scotia Junior C Hockey League Regular Season Championships: 3 (2010–11, 2011–12, 2012–13)

Nova Scotia Junior C Hockey League Pre-Season Championships: 3 (2009–10, 2011–12, 2012–13)

== Yearly results ==
Legend: GP = Games Played, W = Wins, L = Losses, OTL = Overtime Loss, SL = Shootout Loss, PTS = Points

Season	Games	Won	Lost	OTL	SL	PTS	Pct %	GF	GA	Standing	Playoffs
Chester Clippers
2008–09	30	7	22	1	0	15	0.250	94	212	5th in Central	Did not qualify
2009–10	28	22	6	0	0	44	0.786	166	79	2nd in Central	Lost semi-final
2010–11	30	28	2	0	0	56	0.933	278	55	1st in West, 1st overall	Lost final
2011–12	28	28	0	0	0	56	1.000	257	39	1st in Central, 1st overall	Won League, won Atlantics
2012–13	28	25	3	0	0	50	0.892	183	56	1st overall	Won League
Chester Castaways
2019–20	24	8	15	0	1	17	0.354	92	127	4th overall	Lost final
2020–21	12	8	2	0	2	18	0.750	51	36	2nd overall	Finals cancelled due to COVID-19
2021–22	20	13	7	0	0	26	0.650	99	81	2nd of 6	Lost semifinal, 1-3 (Storm)
2022–23	24	0	22	1	1	2	0.042	62	149	6th of 6	Lost quarterfinal, 0-3 (Penguins)
South Shore Schooners
2023–24	24	12	10	1	1	26	0.000	134	127	5th of 8	Lost quarterfinal, 2-3 (Thunder)
2024–25	28	12	11	1	4	29	0.000	131	123	4th of 8	Won quarterfinal, 2-1 (Thunder); Lost Semifinal 1-3 (Attack)
2025–26	25	9	13	2	1	21	0.000	90	116	7th of 8	Lost quarterfinal, 0-3 (Admirals Hockey Club)
