= Sherwood Metros =

- City: Sherwood, Charlottetown, Prince Edward Island
- League: Prince Edward Island Junior C Hockey League
- Founded: 2015–16
- Home arena: Cody Banks Arena
- Colours: Gold, Black, White
- General manager: (Canada) Robert Maddix
- Head coach: (Canada) Sherwyn MacArthur
- Website: www.peijuniorc.com/Sherwood

Franchise history
- 2005–2014: Sherwood Falcons
- 2015–present: Sherwood Metros

The Sherwood Metros (formerly the Sherwood Falcons) are a Canadian Junior C ice hockey team located in Sherwood, Charlottetown, Prince Edward Island. They play in the Prince Edward Island Junior C Hockey League.

== History ==
The Sherwood Falcons were founded in 2005, and have played in Charlottetown for their entire existence. They became defunct between 2009 and 2013, before being resurrected for the 2013–14 season. They were renamed the Metros in 2015.

== Incident vs. Aces ==
In March 2013, in the final game of the season, a brawl erupted when, as handshakes were taking place, three players from the Sherwood Falcons crossed centre ice and charged the Aces' players. The Aces had just won the game to advance to the league final. Eight players and two coaches were suspended beginning the next season.

== Season by season ==
Season	GP	W	L	T	OTL	GF	GA	P	Results	Playoffs
2015-16	28	15	11	0	2	114	93	32	3rd of 6 PEIJHL	Won Quarters 3-0 (Flyers); Lost Semifinals 1-3 (Sabres)
2016-17	26	17	6	0	3	147	1102	37	2nd of 6 PEIJHL	Quarterfinals bye Won Semifinals 3-2 (Sabres); Lost League Finals, 2-4 (Lynx)
2017-18	28	26	2	-	-	175	72	54	1st of 6 PEIJHL	Quarterfinals bye Won Semifinals 3-0 (Crunch); Won Finals 4-3 (Aces); League champions Advance to Maritime-Hockey North
2018-19	26	21	3	0	2	165	85	44	1st of 4 PEIJHL	Won Semifinals 4-2 (Crunch); Lost League Finals, 1-4 (Aces)
2019-20	no data									
2020-21	Season lost due to covid									
2021-22	16	6	10	-	3	49	61	15	3rd of 5 PEIJHL	Won Semifinals 3-0 (Aces); Lost Finals 0-3 (Ice Dogs)
2022-23	27	9	18	1	1	108	133	19	4th of 5 PEIJHL	Lost Playin 1-2 (Crunch)
2023-24	23	5	15	-	3	74	113	13	5th of 5 PEIJHL	Won Play In 2-1 (Lynx); Lost Semifinals, 0-3 (Ice Dogs)
2024-25	24	13	11	-	3	94	87	29	3rd of 6 PEIJHL	Won Play In 3-0 (Lynx); Lost Semifinals, 0-3 (Aces); Selected to replace Aces at Maritime -North
2025-26	29	6	16	1	6	74	93	20	5th of 6 PEIJHL	Won Play In 3-2 (Lions); Lost Semifinals, 0-3 (Ice Dogs)

== Maritime-Hockey North Junior C Championship ==
Eastern Canada Jr C Championships

Year	Round Robin	Record	Standing	SemiFinal	Br. Med. Game	Gold Medal Game
2018	W, Baffin Blizzard 6-5; L, Spryfield Attack 1-4; W, South Side Lynx 5-1; OTW, Tri-County River Cats 4-3	3-1-0	2nd of 5	W, Spryfield Attack 4-3	n/a	W, South Side Lynx 4-1; Maritime-Hockey North Champions
2023; HOST	L, Tri-County River Cats 1-7; L, South West Storm 3-6 -, Tignish Aces (forfeit)	0-2-0	3rd of 4	L, South West Storm 3-6	-	-
2025	W, South West Storm 5-2; L, East Hant Penguins 1-6; L, Tri-County RiverCats 0-6	1-2-0	3rd of 4	-	-	-

== See also ==
- Violence in hockey
- List of ice hockey teams in Prince Edward Island
