= Hockey North =

Canadian ice hockey governing body

- Sport: Ice hockey
- Jurisdiction: Northwest Territories, Nunavut
- Founded: 2008
- President: Mike Gravel
- CEO: Kyle Kugler
- Other key staff: Craig Hockridge

Official website
- hockeynorth.ca
- (Canada)
- (Northwest Territories)
- (Nunavut)

Hockey North is the governing body of all ice hockey in the Northwest Territories and Nunavut, Canada.

== History ==
Hockey North is one of 13 member branches of Hockey Canada. The organization is divided into two regional bodies: Hockey Northwest Territories and Hockey Nunavut. Hockey North sanction championships at the Pee Wee, Bantam, Midget and Junior levels for both boys and girls.

== Nunavut Junior ==
In Nunavut two Junior teams compete annually for the Challenge Cup with its winner earning the chance to play in the Maritime-Hockey North Junior C Championships. The two Junior "C" teams are the Kivalliq Canucks (Rankin Inlet based) and Baffin Blizzard (Iqaluit based).

Originally three teams, Team Kitikmeot and Team Baffin combined to become the Qikiiqtani Elks before changing its name to Baffin Blizzard. Team Kivalliq changed their name in 2007 to the Kivalliq Canucks. The two teams hold regional tryouts and go directly into a head-to-head playoff for the Nunavut Challenge Cup for the right to compete in the Maritime-Hockey North Junior C Championships.
