= Tignish Aces =

- City: Tignish, Prince Edward Island
- League: Prince Edward Island Junior C Hockey League
- Founded: 1997
- Home arena: Credit Union Arena
- Colours: Yellow, Black, White
- General manager: Sharon Horne
- Head coach: Dwayne Handrahan
- Website: www.peijuniorc.com/Tignish

Franchise history
- 1997–present: Tignish Aces

The Tignish Aces (officially the Tignish Perry's Construction Aces) are a Canadian Junior C ice hockey team based in Tignish, Prince Edward Island. They play in the Prince Edward Island Junior C Hockey League. They play at the Credit Union Arena and are coached by Dwayne Handrahan.

== History ==
The Aces were founded in 1997 as a member of the Prince Edward Island Minor Junior Hockey League. They won the league championship in their first season and again in 2003 and 2005. They have been historically the most successful team in the league, winning 10 championships.

== Incident vs Sherwood ==
In March 2013, in the final game of the season, a brawl erupted when, as handshakes were taking place, three players from the Sherwood Falcons crossed centre ice and charged the Aces' players. The Aces had just won the game to advance to the league finals. Eight players and two coaches were suspended beginning the next season.

== Season-by-season ==
Season	GP	W	L	T	OTL	Pts	GF	GA	Results	Playoffs
2007–08	28	26	0	1	0	53	186	62	1st of 5	Won semifinals 4–0 vs Pownal Red Devils; Won finals 4–1 vs North River Flames
2008–09	27	23	2	1	1	48	192	97	1st of 6	Won quarterfinals 3–1 vs Souris Boat Haulers Won semifinals 4–1 vs Pownal Red Devils; Won finals 4–3 vs North River Flames
2009–10	26	19	5	0	2	40	155	71	1st of 6	Won semifinals 3–1 vs Pownal Red Devils; Won finals 4–0 vs Charlottetown Abbies
2010–11	28	23	5	0	0	46	158	82	1st of 8	Won quarterfinals 4–2 vs North River Flames; Lost semifinals 2–4 vs Charlottetown Abbies
2011–12	28	11	14	3	0	25	104	111	4th of 8	Won quarterfinals 3–1 vs Holland Hurricanes Won semifinals 4–3 vs Charlotteown Abbies; Won finals 4–2 vs Pownal Red Devils
2012–13	28	20	6	0	2	42	164	94	1st of 6	Won semifinals 4–1 vs Belfast Sabres; Won finals 4–0 vs South Side Lynx
2013–14	28	17	10	0	1	35	112	103	3rd of 7	Won quarterfinals 3–1 vs North River Flames; Won semifinals 3–1 vs Belfast Sabres Won finals vs 4–1 vs South Side Lynx
2014–15	28	19	8	0	1	39	145	111	3rd of 6	Won quarterfinals 3–1 vs Souris Hawks; Lost semifinals 0–3 vs Belfast Sabres
2015–16	28	13	14	0	1	27	112	126	5th of 6	Won quarterfinals 3–2 vs North River Flames; Lost semifinals 0–3 vs South Side Lynx
2016–17	26	13	12	0	1	27	140	124	5th of 6	Lost quarterfinals 1–3 vs North River Flames
2017–18	28	18	8	0	2	38	166	120	2nd of 6	Won semifinals 3–0 vs South Side Lynx; Lost finals 3–4 vs Sherwood Metros
2018–19	26	20	6	0	0	40	168	103	2nd of 4	Won semifinals 4–1 North River Flames; Won finals 4–1 Sherwood Metros
2019–20	24	22	0	1	1	45	190	63	1st of 5	Won semifinals 3–0 vs Sherwood Metros Finals suspended (COVID-19) vs North River Flames
2020–21	Season lost due to covid									
2021–22	16	11	5	-	1	23	64	47	2nd of 5 PEIJHL	semifinals 0–0 Sherwood Metros
2022–23	16	20	3	1	1	43	154	78	1st of 5 PEIJHL	Won semifinals 4–0 South Side Lynx; Won finals 4–1 Pownal Icedogs
2023–24	24	16	6	x	2	34	169	115	2nd of 5 PEIJHL	Won semifinals 3–0 North River Flames; Won Finals, 4-1 Pownal Icedogs
2024–25	25	17	4	x	4	38	184	104	2nd of 6 PEIJHL	tbd semifinals 0–0 Sherwood Metros
2025–26	33	24	8	x	1	49	202	128	1st of 6 PEIJHL	Won semifinals 3–0 North River Flames; Won League Finals 4-0 Pownal Icedogs; PEI Jr C Championships

== Maritime-Hockey North Junior C Championship ==
Year	Round Robin	Record	Standing	SemiFinal	Br. Med. Game	Gold Medal Game
2019	L, Tri-County River Cats 0–5; Wd, Spryfield Attack 6–3; OTL, Kivalliq Canucks 4–5; L, Western Valley Panthers 4-6	1-2-1	4th of 5	Lost 1–7; Tri-County River Cats	n/a	n/a
2023	L, Tri-County River Cats 1–7; L, South West Storm 2–6 forfeit, Sherwood Metros 0-0	0-3-0	4th of 4	n/a	n/a	n/a
2024	Qualified but did not attend. Replaced by Pownal					
2025	Qualified but did not attend. Replaced by Sherwood Metros					
2026	W, Admirals Hockey Club 6-1; W, Sunny Corner Thunder 7-6; W, Sherwood Metros 7-2	3-0-0	1st of 4	Lost 1–7 n/a	n/a	Won 9-4; Admirals Hockey Club

== See also ==
- List of ice hockey teams in Prince Edward Island
