= Hockey Canada =

Ice hockey governing body of Canada

- Founded: 1968
- Headquarters: Calgary
- Location: Ottawa, Toronto, Montreal, Winnipeg
- President: Katherine Henderson
- CEO: Katherine Henderson
- Replaced: Canadian Amateur Hockey Association (merger in 1994)
- (founded): December 4, 1914

Official website
- www.hockeycanada.ca
- (Canada)

Hockey Canada is the national governing body of ice hockey and ice sledge hockey in Canada. It is a member of the International Ice Hockey Federation and controls the majority of organized ice hockey in Canada. There are some notable exceptions, such as the Canadian Hockey League, U Sports, and Canada's professional hockey clubs.

Hockey Canada was established in 1968, then merged with the Canadian Amateur Hockey Association in 1994. Hockey Canada is based in Calgary, with a secondary office in Ottawa and regional centres in Toronto, Winnipeg and Montreal.

== History ==
The Canadian Amateur Hockey Association was founded on December 4, 1914, when 21 delegates from across Canada met at the Chateau Laurier in Ottawa. The organization was made to oversee the amateur level of the sport at the national level. The Allan Cup, originally donated in 1908 by Sir H. Montagu Allan, was selected as the championship of amateur hockey in Canada. William Northey, the trustee of the Allan Cup, was named the first ever chairman, while Dr. W. F. Taylor was named the inaugural president. The Memorial Cup was the junior amateur championship of Canada.

In 1920, after the Winnipeg Falcons won the Allan Cup over the University of Toronto, they represented Canada at the 1920 Summer Olympic Games. Canada would go 3-0-0 to win the sport's first ever Olympic gold medal.

The Ottawa and District Amateur Hockey Association joined in 1920, followed by the Maritime Amateur Hockey Association in 1928.

On June 30, 1947, the CAHA, the National Hockey League and the Amateur Hockey Association of the United States made an agreement that no player under the age of 18 could be signed as a professional player without the permission of their amateur club. That same year, the International Ice Hockey Federation changed the rules on amateur status. The rule change means the 1948 Allan Cup champion Royal Montreal Hockey Club were not eligible for the 1948 Winter Olympics, so the CAHA sent the RCAF Flyers instead and were victorious.

At the 1952 Winter Olympics, the Edmonton Mercurys won their nation's last Olympic gold until 2002.

In 1961, the Trail Smoke Eaters won Canada's 19th and last world championship for 33 years at the 1961 World Ice Hockey Championships. In 1964, Father David Bauer formed Canada's national team in response to the success of the programs set up by the Soviet Union, Czechoslovakia, and Sweden. Three years later, the CAHA opened its first ever national office, located in Winnipeg.

The Newfoundland Amateur Hockey Association, led by association president Don Johnson, entered the CAHA in 1966. Johnson became CAHA president in 1975. The New Brunswick Amateur Hockey Association left the Maritime AHA brand in 1968 and entered the CAHA as a member.

=== 1968 to 1994 ===
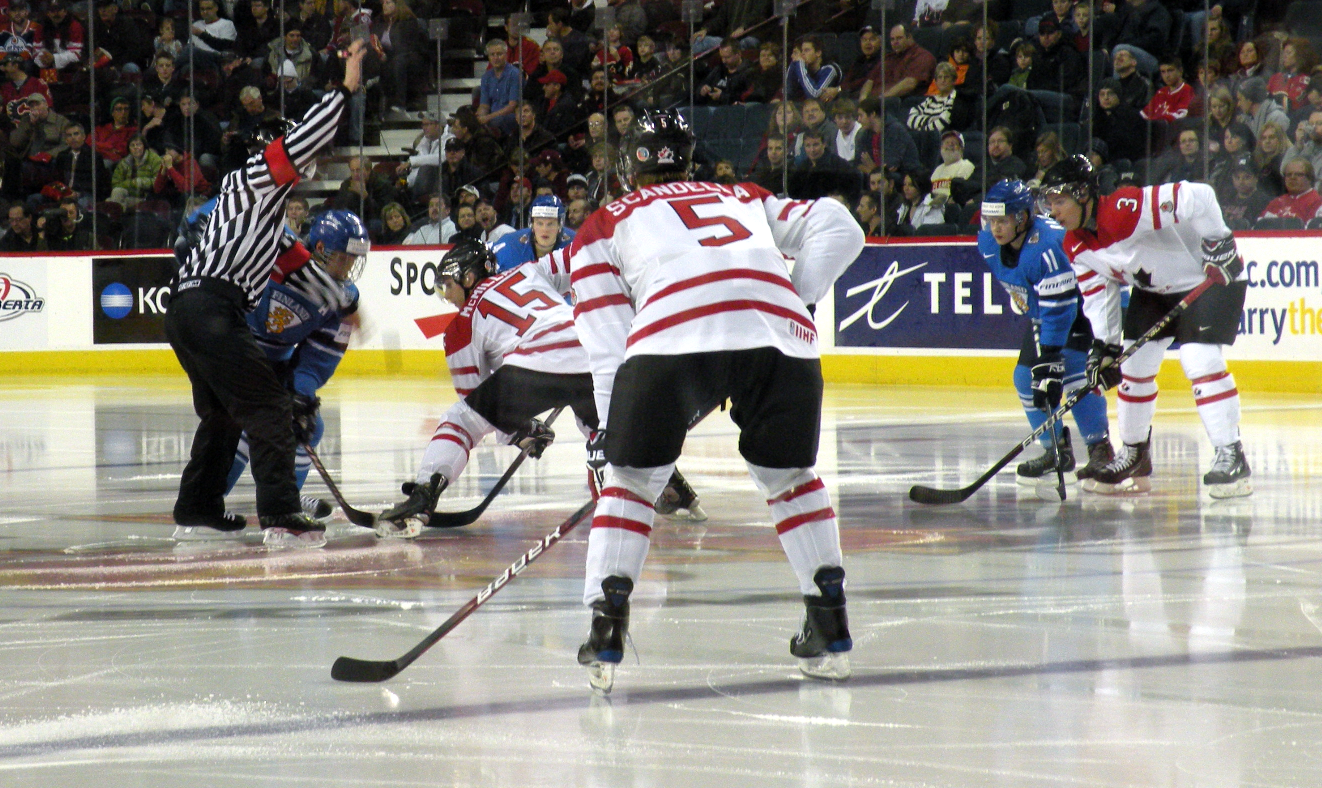
Canadian national junior team vs Finland at an exhibition game in Calgary

In 1968, the Hockey Canada organization was founded to oversee Canada's national teams.

In 1970, the CAHA's 13 Junior A league were divided into two tiers. Tier I, the Western Canada Junior Hockey League, the Ontario Hockey Association, and the Quebec Major Junior Hockey League, were eligible to compete for the Memorial Cup. The ten leagues of Tier II, would compete for the Manitoba Centennial Cup, donated by the Manitoba Amateur Hockey Association (See: Canadian Junior Hockey League).

Also in 1970, Canada pulled out of IIHF competition and would not return to the fold until 1977 in protest of the IIHF's soft stance on Soviet and Czechoslovak teams using "professional amateurs" in international competition but not allowing professional players to compete for Canada.

In 1972, Canada and the Soviet Union competed in the 1972 Summit Series. Canada's team was composed of NHL stars, while the Soviet players were from the Red Army. The NHLers won the series 4-3-1. Two years later, the World Hockey Association represented Canada and lost the series 1-4-3. In 1976, the Canada Cup was formed as a best-on-best championship.

In 1974, the Nova Scotia Amateur Hockey Association and Prince Edward Island Amateur Hockey Association are formed out of the dissolution of the Maritime AHA.

The World Junior Ice Hockey Championships was held for the first time. Canada, who sent Memorial Cup champion teams in early years, eventually set up a national team and won their first gold medal at the 1982 World Junior Ice Hockey Championships.

In 1975, the QMJHL, WCJHL, and the renamed Ontario Major Junior Hockey League form an umbrella organization known as the Canadian Major Junior Hockey League. With the creation of the CMJHL, the three league began initiating compensation talks with the NHL and WHA without CAHA input. In 1980, the CMJHL separated from the CAHA, only staying loosely affiliated with the national body. With the separation of the CMJHL, Tier II was promoted to simply Junior A, although the Tier II title still persists in hockey vernacular. To this day, the CMJHL (now Canadian Hockey League) releases its players to Hockey Canada to play at the World Junior Ice Hockey Championships.

In 1983, the first Abby Hoffman Cup was awarded to the Burlington Ladies as the Canadian national senior champions of women's hockey.

In 1990, the forerunner to the Canadian Junior Hockey League was created as an umbrella organization, within the CAHA, to oversee Junior A hockey.

The Canada women's national ice hockey team was formed in 1987 and won the first (unofficial) world championship that year. The 1990 IIHF Women's World Championship was the first official event, also won by Canada.

In 1994, Team Canada ended a 33-year drought by winning the 1994 Men's World Ice Hockey Championships.

=== 1994 to 2022 ===
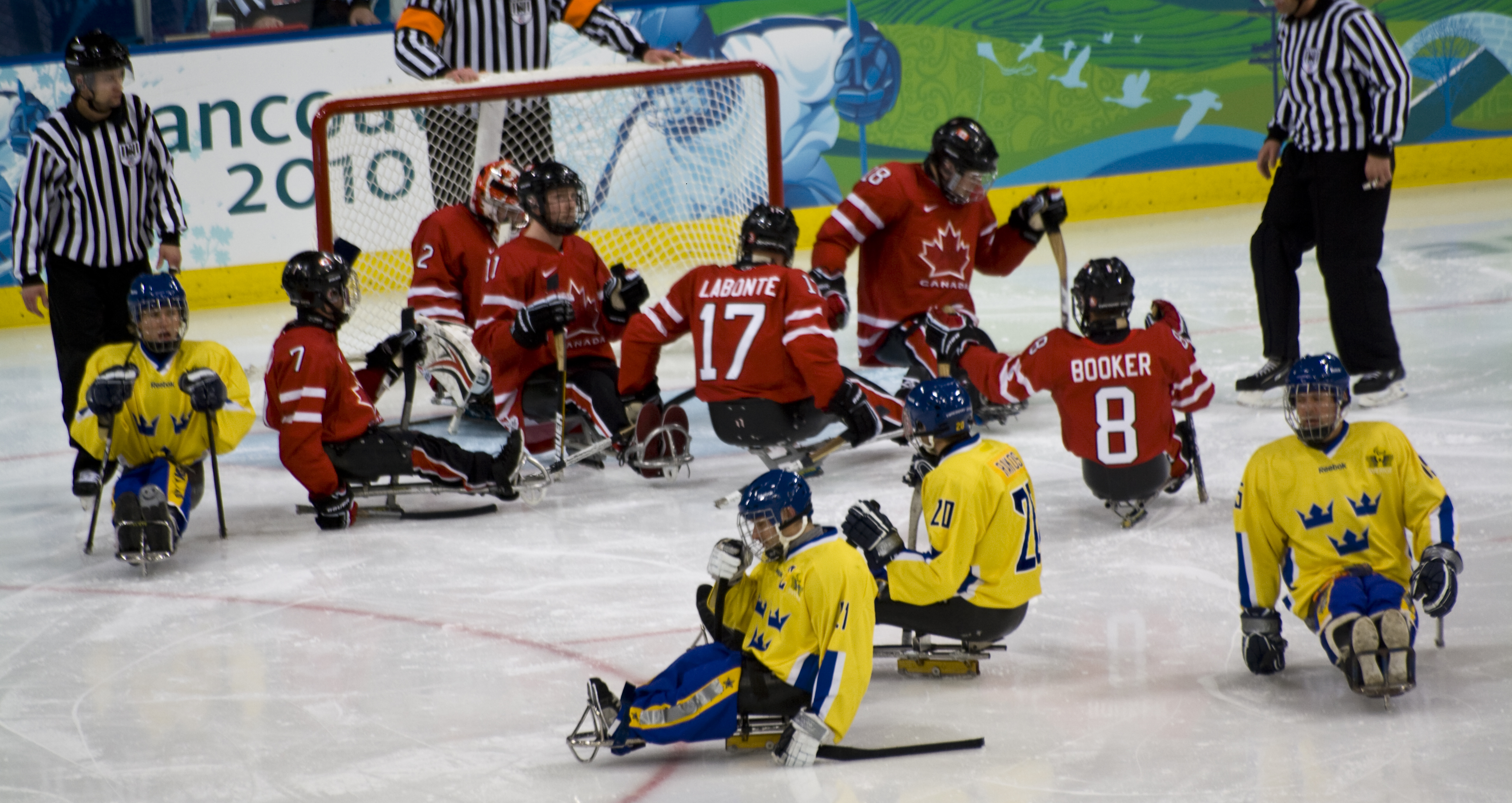
Canadian national sledge hockey team vs Sweden, Vancouver 2010 Paralympics

In 1994, Hockey Canada and the CAHA merged into one organization. Also, the International Olympic Committee elected to allow professional players to compete at the Olympics and created a women's event at the games. That same year, Hockey North became the 13th branch of Hockey Canada.

The Canadian men and women won gold at the 2002 Winter Olympics in Salt Lake City. The Canadian men win their first gold medal in fifty years, while the women win their first in two tries.

In 2004, the Canada men's national ice sledge hockey team was welcomed into the Hockey Canada fold, and Mark Aubry was named the Chief Medical Officer of Hockey Canada.

In 2006, the Canadian women won gold at the 2006 Olympics and the sledge team conquered gold at the 2006 Winter Paralympics.

The Clarkson Cup, donated by the Governor General of Canada Adrienne Clarkson, was created in 2006, and was first awarded in 2009 to the Canadian national senior champions of women's hockey. The Clarkson Cup replaced the Abby Hoffman Cup.

Team Canada's men's and women's teams won gold in both the 2010 and 2014 Winter Olympics, hosted by Vancouver and Sochi respectively.

Tom Renney retired as chief executive officer of Hockey Canada on July 1, 2022, and was succeeded by Scott Smith who also served as president.

==== Sexual assault incidents ====
In June 2022, a scandal emerged over Hockey Canada's handling of sexual assault allegations surrounding the organization, stemming from its May 2022 settlement of alleged abuses by members of Canada's junior team in 2018. Minister for Sport Pascale St-Onge suspended federal funding of Hockey Canada via Sport Canada, and called for an audit over whether taxpayer money was used to pay out these settlements. Later that month, the Standing Committee on Canadian Heritage opened an inquiry into the settlement. which revealed a history of sexual misconduct cases raised against Hockey Canada, and that the organization had spent C$7.6 million out of a "National Equity Fund"—funded with player registration fees—to help pay out settlements in 21 sexual misconduct cases since 1989.

Amid calls for leadership changes at Hockey Canada, Smith and the entire board of directors resigned on October 11, 2022.

==== Exceptional player status ====
Hockey Canada determines if an underage player is eligible for "exceptional status". Exceptional player status allows skilled, underage hockey players to enter the major junior circuit early. As of 2024, nine players have been granted exceptional status: John Tavares, Aaron Ekblad, Sean Day, Connor McDavid, Joseph Veleno, Shane Wright, Connor Bedard, Michael Misa and Landon DuPont. As of 2023, seven have gone number one in their respective major junior drafts while four players have been selected first overall in their respective NHL drafts. In 2024, the "Western Canadian Development Model" was approved to allow players granted exceptional status as early as age 12, to play a half season with the local WHL team at age 15, without further application for exceptional status; the change was first exercised by Maddox Schultz.

=== 2023 to present ===
Katherine Henderson was appointed as chief executive officer and president in 2023.

In 2023, the British Columbia Hockey League decided not to renew its agreement with Hockey Canada and became an independent league. The league cited improved recruitment opportunities for 16 and 17 year old players in Canada as well as anticipated improved interest from Americans and players outside of North America as important reasons for the decision. In April 2024, the Vancouver Island Junior Hockey League followed suit and announced it would also withdraw and become an independent farm league for the BCHL beginning in the 2024-25 season.

In the 2024–25 season, Hockey Canada and its four western affiliates – BC Hockey, Hockey Alberta, Hockey Saskatchewan and Hockey Manitoba – will pilot the Western Canadian Development Model (WCDM). Under the WCDM, junior leagues will adopt most of the Western Hockey League rulebook, excluding some sections, and restrictions on 15-year-old affiliate players in the Western Hockey League will be loosened. Players that will be 18-years of age or older in the calendar year will be allowed to choose whether to use full-face protection or half-face protection, whilst younger players will be required to use full-face protection.

== List of presidents ==
List of Canadian Amateur Hockey Association presidents (1914–1994), and Hockey Canada presidents (1994–present). Prior to the merger of the two organizations in 1994, Hockey Canada leadership included Max Bell, Charles Hay, Doug Fisher, Lou Lefaive, Bill Hay, and Derek Holmes.

- 1914–1915, W. F. Taylor
- 1915–1919, James T. Sutherland
- 1916–1918, J. F. Paxton (acting president)
- 1919–1920, Frederick E. Betts
- 1920–1921, H. J. Sterling
- 1921–1922, W. R. Granger
- 1922–1924, Toby Sexsmith
- 1924–1926, Silver Quilty
- 1926–1928, Frank Sandercock
- 1928–1930, W. A. Fry
- 1930–1932, Jack Hamilton
- 1932–1934, Frank Greenleaf
- 1934–1936, E. A. Gilroy
- 1936–1938, Cecil Duncan
- 1938–1940, W. G. Hardy
- 1940–1942, George Dudley
- 1942–1945, Frank Sargent
- 1945–1947, Hanson Dowell
- 1947–1950, Al Pickard
- 1950–1952, Doug Grimston
- 1952–1955, W. B. George
- 1955–1957, Jimmy Dunn
- 1957–1959, Robert Lebel
- 1959–1960, Gordon Juckes
- 1960–1962, Jack Roxburgh
- 1962–1964, Art Potter
- 1964–1966, Lionel Fleury
- 1966–1968, Fred Page
- 1968, Lloyd Pollock
- 1969–1971, Earl Dawson
- 1971–1973, Joe Kryczka
- 1973–1975, Jack Devine
- 1975–1977, Don Johnson
- 1977–1979, Gord Renwick
- 1979–1998, Murray Costello
- 1998–2014, Bob Nicholson
- 2014–2016, Tom Renney
- 2016–2022, Scott Smith
- 2023–present, Katherine Henderson

== Affiliated organizations ==
- BC Hockey
- Hockey Alberta
- Hockey Eastern Ontario
- Hockey Manitoba
- Hockey New Brunswick
- Hockey Newfoundland and Labrador
- Hockey North
- Hockey Northwestern Ontario
- Hockey Nova Scotia
- Hockey PEI
- Hockey Québec
- Hockey Saskatchewan
- Ontario Hockey Federation

Organizations in cooperation with Hockey Canada

- Canadian Junior Hockey League

On-ice officials

- Hockey Canada Officiating Program

Non-member partners

- Canadian Hockey League
- U Sports

== National competitions ==
- Allan Cup Senior "AAA"
- Clarkson Cup Women's Senior
- Centennial Cup Junior "A"
- Telus Cup Midget (Minor)
- Esso Cup Female Midget (Minor)
- National Women's Under-18 Championship
- Canada Games - Winter Men's U16 and Women's U18

=== Inter-branch ===
- Don Johnson Cup Maritime Canada Junior "B"
- Keystone Cup Western Canada Junior "B"
- Maritime-Hockey North Junior C Championships Maritime/Hockey North Junior "C"
- Western Shield Western Canada Female Senior "A" and "B"

=== Defunct ===
- Alexander Cup Major Senior
- Hardy Cup Senior "AA"/Intermediate "A"
- Edmonton Journal Trophy Western Canada Intermediate "A"
- Esso Women's Nationals Women's Senior
- Abbott Cup Western Canada Junior "A"
- J. Pius Callaghan Cup Atlantic Canada Junior "A"
- Western Canada Cup Western & Pacific Junior "A"
- Fred Page Cup Eastern Region Junior "A"
- Dudley Hewitt Cup Central Region Junior "A"
- Anavet Cup Western Canada Junior "A"
- Doyle Cup Pacific Canada Junior "A"
- Brewers Cup Western Canada Junior "C"

== International competitions ==
Canada
- Association name: Hockey Canada
- IIHF Code: CAN
- IIHF membership: 1920
- President: Katherine Henderson
- IIHF men's ranking: 2
- IIHF women's ranking: 2

=== Run by Hockey Canada ===
- World U-17 Hockey Challenge
- World Junior A Challenge
- World Sledge Hockey Challenge
- Hlinka Gretzky Cup (Men's U18, in partnership with the Czechia and the Slovak federations).

=== Run by the IIHF ===
- Ice Hockey World Championships
- IIHF World Junior Championship
- IIHF World U18 Championships
- IIHF World Women's U18 Championships
- IIHF World Women's Championships

=== Run by other organizations ===
- 4 Nations Cup (Women's)
- World Cup of Hockey (Men's)
- Winter Olympics
- Youth Olympic Games
- World Para Ice Hockey Championships
- Winter Paralympics
- Spengler Cup
